= 23rd Manitoba Legislature =

The members of the 23rd Manitoba Legislature were elected in the Manitoba general election held in November 1949. The legislature sat from February 14, 1950, to April 23, 1953.

A coalition government of the Liberal-Progressive Party and the Progressive Conservative Party held a majority of seats in the assembly. Douglas Lloyd Campbell served as Premier. The Progressive Conservatives withdrew from the coalition in 1950.

Edwin Hansford of the Co-operative Commonwealth Federation was Leader of the Opposition. Errick Willis of the Progressive Conservatives became opposition leader after his party left the coalition in 1950.

Wallace C. Miller served as speaker for the assembly until he was named to cabinet in August 1950.Nicholas Bachynsky succeeded Miller as speaker.

There were seven sessions of the 23rd Legislature:

Session	Start	End
1st	February 14, 1950	April 22, 1950
2nd	November 7, 1950	November 16, 1950
3rd	February 1, 1951	
4th	February 5, 1952	
5th	July 22, 1952	July 26, 1952
6th	January 13, 1953	January 16, 1953
7th	February 24, 1953	April 18, 1953

Roland Fairbairn McWilliams was Lieutenant Governor of Manitoba.

== Members of the Assembly ==
The following members were elected to the assembly in 1949:

Member	Electoral district	Party	First elected / previously elected	No.# of term(s)	Notes
John R. Pitt	Arthur	Liberal-Progressive	1935	5th term	
Reginald Wightman	Assiniboia	Liberal-Progressive	1949	1st term	
Francis Campbell Bell	Birtle	Liberal-Progressive	1936	4th term	
Joseph Donaldson	Brandon City	Progressive Conservative	1949	1st term	Resigned April 18, 1951
Joseph Donaldson	Brandon City	Independent	1949	1st term	Resigned April 18, 1951
Reginald Lissaman (1952)	Brandon City	Progressive Conservative	1952	1st term	
Edmond Prefontaine	Carillon	Independent Liberal; Anti-Coalition	1935	5th term	
Edmond Prefontaine	Carillon	Liberal-Progressive	1935	5th term	
James Christie	Cypress	Liberal-Progressive	1932	5th term	
Ernest McGirr	Dauphin	Progressive Conservative	1949	1st term	
James O. Argue	Deloraine—Glenwood	Progressive Conservative	1945	2nd term	
James O. Argue	Deloraine—Glenwood	Independent	1945	2nd term	
Walter McDonald	Dufferin	Liberal-Progressive	1949	1st term	
John R. Solomon	Emerson	Liberal-Progressive	1941	3rd term	
Michael Hryhorczuk	Ethelbert	Liberal-Progressive	1949	1st term	
James Anderson	Fairford	Liberal-Progressive	1948	2nd term	
Nicholas Bachynsky	Fisher	Liberal-Progressive	1922	7th term	
Ray Mitchell	Gilbert Plains	Liberal-Progressive	1949	1st term	
Steinn Thompson	Gimli	Liberal-Progressive	1945	2nd term	
William Morton	Gladstone	Liberal-Progressive	1927	6th term	
Charles Shuttleworth	Hamiota	Liberal-Progressive	1949	1st term	
John McDowell	Iberville	Independent Progressive Conservative; Anti-Coalition	1945	2nd term	
John McDowell	Iberville	Progressive Conservative	1945	2nd term	
George Olive	Kildonan-Transcona	CCF	1945	2nd term	
Abram Harrison	Killarney	Progressive Conservative	1943	3rd term	
Douglas Lloyd Campbell	Lakeside	Liberal-Progressive	1922	7th term	
Thomas Seens	Lansdowne	Progressive Conservative	1949	1st term	
Sauveur Marcoux	La Verendrye	Liberal-Progressive	1936	4th term	Died in office November 16, 1951
Edmond Brodeur (1952)	La Verendrye	Liberal-Progressive	1952	1st term	
Hugh Morrison	Manitou—Morden	Independent Progressive Conservative; Anti-Coalition	1936	4th term	
Hugh Morrison	Manitou—Morden	Progressive Conservative	1936	4th term	
Henry Rungay	Minnedosa	Liberal-Progressive	1948	2nd term	
Harry Shewman	Morris	Independent Coalition	1949	1st term	
Harry Shewman	Morris	Independent	1949	1st term	
Ivan Schultz	Mountain	Liberal-Progressive	1930	6th term	
Samuel Burch	Norfolk—Beautiful Plains	Liberal-Progressive	1949	1st term	
Charles Greenlay	Portage la Prairie	Progressive Conservative	1943	3rd term	
Wallace C. Miller	Rhineland	Progressive Conservative	1936	4th term	
Ronald Robertson	Roblin	Independent Coalition	1945	2nd term	
Ronald Robertson	Roblin	Liberal-Progressive	1945	2nd term	
Robert Bend	Rockwood	Independent Progressive Conservative; Coalition	1949	1st term	
Robert Bend	Rockwood	Independent Liberal	1949	1st term	
Daniel Hamilton	Rupertsland	Liberal-Progressive	1941	3rd term	
Rodney Clement	Russell	Independent Coalition	1949	1st term	
Rodney Clement	Russell	Independent Liberal	1949	1st term	
James McLenaghen	St. Andrews	Progressive Conservative	1927	6th term	Died in office June 23, 1950
Thomas P. Hillhouse (1950)	St. Andrews	Liberal-Progressive	1950	1st term	
Joseph Van Belleghem	St. Boniface	Liberal-Progressive	1949	1st term	
Edwin Hansford	St. Boniface	CCF	1945	2nd term	
Nicholas Stryk	St. Clements	Liberal-Progressive	1941, 1949	2nd term*	Died in office July 11, 1950
Thomas P. Hillhouse (1950)	St. Clements	Liberal-Progressive	1950	1st term	
Christian Halldorson	St. George	Liberal-Progressive	1945	2nd term	
Maurice Dane MacCarthy	Ste. Rose	Liberal-Progressive	1927	6th term	
William Lucko	Springfield	Liberal-Progressive	1949	1st term	
George Renouf	Swan River	Independent Conservative; Anti-Coalition	1932	5th term	
George Renouf	Swan River	Progressive Conservative	1932	5th term	
Francis Jobin	The Pas	Independent Liberal; Coalition	1949	1st term	
Errick Willis	Turtle Mountain	Progressive Conservative	1936	4th term	
Robert Mooney	Virden	Liberal-Progressive	1922	7th term	
Paul Bardal	Winnipeg Centre	Liberal-Progressive	1941, 1949	2nd term*	
Gordon Fines	Winnipeg Centre	CCF	1949	1st term	
Charles Rhodes Smith	Winnipeg Centre	Liberal-Progressive	1941	3rd term	
Donovan Swailes	Winnipeg Centre	CCF	1945	2nd term	
Morris Gray	Winnipeg North	CCF	1941	3rd term	
Frank Chester	Winnipeg North	Liberal-Progressive	1949	1st term	
John Hawryluk	Winnipeg North	CCF	1949	1st term	
Bill Kardash	Winnipeg North	Labor–Progressive	1941	3rd term	
John Stewart McDiarmid	Winnipeg South	Liberal-Progressive	1932	5th term	
Duff Roblin	Winnipeg South	Independent Progressive Conservative; Anti-Coalition	1949	1st term	
Duff Roblin	Winnipeg South	Progressive Conservative	1949	1st term	
Lloyd Stinson	Winnipeg South	CCF	1945	2nd term	
Ronald Turner	Winnipeg South	Liberal-Progressive	1946	2nd term	

== By-elections ==
By-elections were held to replace members for various reasons:

Electoral district	Member elected	Affiliation	Election date	Reason
St. Andrews	Thomas P. Hillhouse	Liberal-Progressive	October 24, 1950	J McLenaghen died June 23, 1950
St. Clements	Albert Trapp	Liberal-Progressive	October 24, 1950	N Stryk died July 11, 1950
Brandon City	Reginald Lissaman	Progressive Conservative	January 21, 1952	J Donaldson resigned April 18, 1951
La Verendrye	Edmond Brodeur	Liberal-Progressive	January 21, 1952	S Marcoux died November 16, 1951
