= 24th Manitoba Legislature =

The members of the 24th Manitoba Legislature were elected in the Manitoba general election held in June 1953. The legislature sat from February 2, 1954 to April 30, 1958.

The Liberal-Progressive Party led by Douglas Lloyd Campbell formed the government.

Errick Willis of the Progressive Conservative Party was Leader of the Opposition. Duff Roblin defeated Willis at a leadership convention in June 1954 to become party leader.

In 1957, the Employment Standards Act was passed; it was intended to standardize conditions of employment such as hours of work and termination of employment. In the same year, the Equal Pay Act was also passed, which provided for equal pay for equal work within the same organization.

Nicholas Bachynsky served as speaker for the assembly.

There were four sessions of the 24th Legislature:

Session	Start	End
1st	February 2, 1954	March 25, 1954
2nd	February 1, 1955	March 31, 1955
3rd	January 31, 1956	April 23, 1956
4th	January 29, 1957	April 5, 1957

John Stewart McDiarmid was Lieutenant Governor of Manitoba.

== Members of the Assembly ==
The following members were elected to the assembly in 1953:

Member	Electoral district	Party	First elected / previously elected	No.# of term(s)	Notes
J. Arthur Ross	Arthur	Progressive Conservative	1953	1st term	
Reginald Wightman	Assiniboia	Liberal-Progressive	1949	2nd term	
Francis Campbell Bell	Birtle	Liberal-Progressive	1936	5th term	
Reginald Lissaman	Brandon City	Progressive Conservative	1952	2nd term	
Edmond Prefontaine	Carillon	Liberal-Progressive	1935	6th term	
Francis Ferg	Cypress	Liberal-Progressive	1953	1st term	
William Bullmore	Dauphin	Social Credit	1953	1st term	
William Bullmore	Dauphin	Independent	1953	1st term	
James O. Argue	Deloraine—Glenwood	Progressive Conservative	1945	3rd term	Died in Office 1955
Albert Draper (1955)	Deloraine—Glenwood	Progressive Conservative	1955	1st term	From June 27, 1955
Walter McDonald	Dufferin	Liberal-Progressive	1949	2nd term	
John R. Solomon	Emerson	Independent Liberal-Progressive	1941	4th term	Appointed Judge Resigned seat in 1957
John Tanchak (1957)	Emerson	Liberal-Progressive	1957	1st term	From November 14, 1957
Michael Hryhorczuk	Ethelbert	Liberal-Progressive	1949	2nd term	
James Anderson	Fairford	Liberal-Progressive	1948	3rd term	
Nicholas Bachynsky	Fisher	Liberal-Progressive	1922	8th term	
Ray Mitchell	Gilbert Plains	Liberal-Progressive	1949	2nd term	
Steinn Thompson	Gimli	Liberal-Progressive	1945	3rd term	
William Morton	Gladstone	Liberal-Progressive	1927	7th term	
Charles Shuttleworth	Hamiota	Liberal-Progressive	1949	2nd term	
John McDowell	Iberville	Progressive Conservative	1945	3rd term	
Russell Paulley	Kildonan-Transcona	CCF	1953	1st term	
Abram Harrison	Killarney	Progressive Conservative	1943	4th term	
Douglas Lloyd Campbell	Lakeside	Liberal-Progressive	1922	8th term	
Matthew R. Sutherland	Lansdowne	Liberal-Progressive	1936, 1953	4th term*	
Edmond Brodeur	La Verendrye	Liberal-Progressive	1952	2nd term	
Hugh Morrison	Manitou—Morden	Progressive Conservative	1936	5th term	Died in office January 9, 1957
Maurice Ridley (1957)	Manitou—Morden	Progressive Conservative	1957	1st term	From November 14, 1957
Gilbert Hutton	Minnedosa	Social Credit	1953	1st term	
Harry Shewman	Morris	Independent	1949	2nd term	
Harry Shewman	Morris	Progressive Conservative	1949	2nd term	
Ivan Schultz	Mountain	Liberal-Progressive	1930	7th term	Appointed Judge resigned seat January 22, 1955
Walter Clark (1955)	Mountain	Liberal-Progressive	1955	1st term	From June 27, 1955
Samuel Burch	Norfolk—Beautiful Plains	Liberal-Progressive	1949	2nd term	
Charles Greenlay	Portage la Prairie	Liberal-Progressive	1943	4th term	
Wallace C. Miller	Rhineland	Liberal-Progressive	1936	5th term	
Ronald Robertson	Roblin	Liberal-Progressive	1945	3rd term	
Robert Bend	Rockwood	Independent Liberal-Progressive	1949	2nd term	
Robert Bend	Rockwood	Liberal-Progressive	1949	2nd term	
Roy Brown	Rupertsland (Note: Election deferred to July 6, 1953)	Liberal-Progressive	1953	1st term	
Rodney Clement	Russell	Independent Liberal-Progressive	1949	2nd term	
Rodney Clement	Russell	Liberal-Progressive	1949	2nd term	
Thomas Hillhouse	St. Andrews	Liberal-Progressive	1950	2nd term	
L. Raymond Fennell	St. Boniface	Liberal-Progressive	1953	1st term	
Roger Teillet	St. Boniface	Liberal-Progressive	1953	1st term	
Stanley Copp	St. Clements	Liberal-Progressive	1953	1st term	
Christian Halldorson	St. George	Liberal-Progressive	1945	3rd term	Died in office September 18, 1956
Elman Guttormson (1956)	St. George	Liberal-Progressive	1956	1st term	From December 3, 1956
Gildas Molgat	Ste. Rose	Liberal-Progressive	1953	1st term	
William Lucko	Springfield	Liberal-Progressive	1949	2nd term	
George Renouf	Swan River	Progressive Conservative	1932	6th term	
Francis Jobin	The Pas	Liberal-Progressive	1949	2nd term	
Errick Willis	Turtle Mountain	Progressive Conservative	1936	5th term	
John Thompson	Virden	Progressive Conservative	1953	1st term	
Stephen Juba	Winnipeg Centre	Independent	1953	1st term	
Jack St. John	Winnipeg Centre	Liberal-Progressive	1953	1st term	
Hank Scott	Winnipeg Centre	Progressive Conservative	1953	1st term	
Donovan Swailes	Winnipeg Centre	CCF	1945	3rd term	
Morris Gray	Winnipeg North	CCF	1941	4th term	
John Hawryluk	Winnipeg North	CCF	1949	2nd term	
Bill Kardash	Winnipeg North	Communist	1941	4th term	
Alex Turk	Winnipeg North	Liberal-Progressive	1953	1st term	
Gurney Evans	Winnipeg South	Progressive Conservative	1953	1st term	
Duff Roblin	Winnipeg South	Progressive Conservative	1949	2nd term	
Lloyd Stinson	Winnipeg South	CCF	1945	3rd term	
Ronald Turner	Winnipeg South	Liberal-Progressive	1946	3rd term	

== By-elections ==
By-elections were held to replace members for various reasons:

Electoral district	Member elected	Affiliation	Election date	Reason
Deloraine—Glenwood	Albert Draper	Progressive Conservative	June 27, 1955	J O Argue died
Mountain	Walter Clark	Liberal-Progressive	June 27, 1955	I Schultz named judge January 22, 1955
St. George	Elman Guttormson	Liberal-Progressive	December 3, 1956	C Halldorson died September 18, 1956
Emerson	John Tanchak	Liberal-Progressive	November 14, 1957	J R Solomon named judge
Manitou—Morden	Maurice Ridley	Progressive Conservative	November 14, 1957	Hugh Morrison died January 9, 1957
