= Morris Gray =

Canadian politician (1889-1966)

Morris Abraham Gray (May 16, 1889-January 22, 1966) was a politician in Manitoba, Canada. He served as a member of the provincial legislature from 1941 to 1966, and was a prominent figure in the province's social-democratic Cooperative Commonwealth Federation (CCF) during this period.

== Biography ==
Gray was born to Abraham and Sara Gur-Arie, a Jewish family in Gomel (now in Belarus), and received a high school education in that region. He arrived in Canada in 1908, a committed leftist following the attempted revolution of 1905. In 1911, he married Sonia Bruser.

Gray was a founder of the Canadian Jewish Congress, and at one stage served as its national Vice-President. He also became a member of the Mount Sinai Masonic Lodge and the Jewish Children's Aid Society, and was an Executive Member of the Canada Club.

Gray served as a member of the Winnipeg School Board from 1926 to 1930, and was an Alderman in the city of Winnipeg from 1930 to 1942. He was first elected to the Manitoba legislature in the provincial election of 1941, in the riding of Winnipeg. At the time, Winnipeg elected ten members by preferential balloting. Gray topped the CCF list on the first count, with 3,086 votes (ahead of party leader Seymour Farmer), finishing in eighth place overall. Gray and Farmer were subsequently elected on transfers, although longtime Independent Labour Party/CCF Member of the Legislative Assembly John Queen was defeated.

The 1941 election took place in a period of reduced support for the provincial CCF. The party had joined an all-party coalition government the previous year, with Farmer serving as Minister of Labour under Liberal-Progressive Premier John Bracken. The alliance proved disastrous for the CCF, who regularly saw their initiatives thwarted by the other parties. The demoralized party won only three seats in the entire province. After the alliance ended in 1943, Gray played a prominent role in rebuilding the CCF's organization.

The CCF performed much more strongly in the 1945 general election, winning four seats in Winnipeg: Farmer (who topped the poll), Gray (who finished sixth), Lloyd Stinson and Donovan Swailes. The party was unable to match this success in the rest of the province, however, and remained in opposition.

In the provincial election of 1949, the City of Winnipeg was divided into three electoral zones, each of which elected four members. Gray ran in Winnipeg North, where he topped the poll and was the only candidate to be elected on the first count. He repeated this performance in the 1953 election; on both occasions, his leading opponent was Bill Kardash of the communist Labour Progressive Party.

Manitoba adopted a system of single-member constituencies for Winnipeg in the mid-1950s, and Gray (despite his strong objection to the new system) was easily elected for the riding of Inkster in the provincial election of 1958. He faced a slightly more serious challenge from the Progressive Conservatives in the 1959 election (in which PC leader Dufferin Roblin won an historic majority), but still defeated his leading opponent by over 1,500 votes. The CCF merged itself into the New Democratic Party (NDP) in 1961, and Gray joined the new party along with other members of his caucus.

Gray's final election, in 1962, was the closest of his career, as he defeated Liberal candidate John Shanski by fewer than 600 votes. He died shortly before the election of 1966, and his riding was subsequently won by Sidney Green of the NDP.

Gray was respected by members of all parties for his advocacy on behalf of the disadvantaged. He frequently used the phrase, "I know mine is a voice in the wilderness" in his parliamentary orations. Among the causes he championed were a provincial labour code, health insurance, child welfare legislation, mother's allowances and old age pensions. His appeals for supplementary aid for old-age pensioners were turned down fourteen years in a row by the governments of Stuart Garson and Douglas L. Campbell. Gray was voted "Citizen of the Year" by the Winnipeg Tribune in 1958.

He died in Winnipeg at the age of 76.

Morris Gray was the uncle of Gerald B. Gray, a Manitoba businessman, philanthropist and community leader.
