= Frank Chester (politician) =

Canadian politician

Frank Leslie Chester

MLA
- In office 1949–1953 Serving with Morris Gray, John Hawryluk, Bill Kardash
- Preceded by: new district
- Succeeded by: Alexander Turk
- Constituency: Winnipeg North (multiple member constituency)

Personal details
- Born: November 30, 1901 Winnipeg, Manitoba
- Died: August 13, 1966 (aged 64)
- Party: Liberal-Progressive
- Profession: merchant

Frank Leslie Chester (November 30, 1901 – August 13, 1966) was a politician in the Canadian province of Manitoba, who served on Winnipeg City Council and in the Legislative Assembly of Manitoba.

Born in Winnipeg, Chester was educated in Vancouver, British Columbia, and returned to Winnipeg later in life. He worked as a hardware merchant, and served as an alderman in Winnipeg from 1947 to 1950.

He was elected to the Manitoba legislature as a Liberal-Progressive in the 1949 provincial election in the constituency of Winnipeg North, which elected four members by a single transferable ballot. Chester finished third on the first count, and was declared elected on the eighth and final count. He served as a backbench supporter of Douglas Lloyd Campbell's government during his time in the legislature.

He did not seek re-election in the 1953 provincial election, but instead ran as a candidate of the Liberal Party of Canada at Winnipeg North in the 1953 federal election. He lost to CCF MP Alistair Stewart by 5,911 votes.
