= Van Belleghem =

Van Belleghem is a surname. Notable people with the surname include:

- Joseph Van Belleghem (1901–1967), Canadian politician
- Wim Van Belleghem (1963–2026), Belgian rower
