= 1962 Manitoba general election =

- December 14, 1962

57 seats of the Legislative Assembly of Manitoba 29 seats were needed for a majority
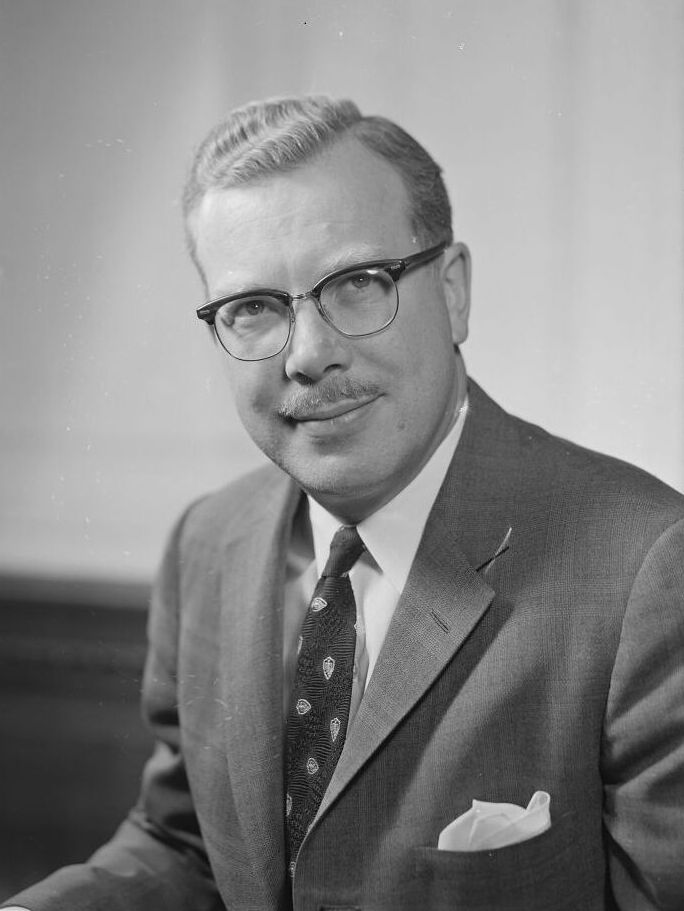

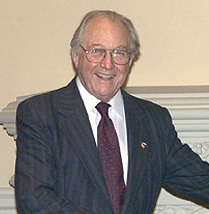
	First party	Second party
Leader	Duff Roblin	Gildas Molgat
Party	Progressive Conservative	Liberal
Leader since	June 17, 1954	April 20, 1961
Leader's seat	Wolseley	Ste. Rose
Last election	36	11
Seats won	36	13
Seat change	Steady	▲2
Popular vote	134,208	103,283
Percentage	45.0%	36.3%
Swing	▼2.0pp	▲6.0pp
	Third party	Fourth party
	NDP	SC
Leader	Russell Paulley	Jacob Froese
Party	New Democratic	Social Credit
Leader since	November 4, 1961	1959
Leader's seat	Radisson	Rhineland
Last election	10	-
Seats won	7	1
Seat change	▼3	▲1
Popular vote	47,304	6,930
Percentage	15.8%	2.3%
Swing	▼6.0pp	▲2.3pp
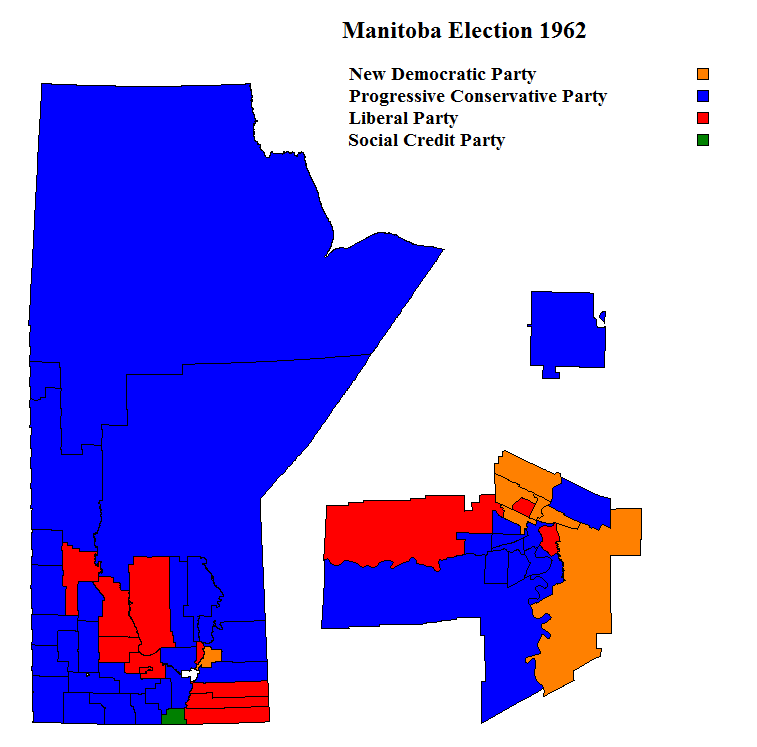
- Map of Election Results
Premier before election
Dufferin Roblin
Progressive Conservative
Premier after the election
Dufferin Roblin
Progressive Conservative

The 1962 Manitoba general election was held on December 14, 1962 to elect 57 members to the Legislative Assembly of Manitoba, Canada. It resulted in a majority victory for the incumbent Progressive Conservatives under the leadership of Premier Dufferin Roblin, securing a third term for the party.

Roblin's Tories won 36 seats versus 13 for the Liberals led by Gildas Molgat, 7 for the social democratic New Democrats led by Russell Paulley, and 1 seat for the Social Credit Party led by Jacob Froese.

The Communist Party ran two candidates, neither being successful.

== Detailed Results ==
=== Summary ===
Party	Party leader	# of candidates	Seats		Popular vote		
Party	Party leader	# of candidates	1959	Elected	#	%	% Change
Progressive Conservative	Dufferin Roblin	57	36	36	134,208	45.0%	
Liberal	Gildas Molgat	57	11	13	108,283	36.3%	
New Democratic	Russell Paulley	40	10	7	47,304	15.8%	
Social Credit	Jacob Froese	11	-	1	6,930	2.3%	
Communist	William Cecil Ross	2	-	-	816	0.3%	
Independent		3	-	-	960	0.3%	
Total		170	57	57	298,501	100%	

Popular vote
PC	44.96%
Liberal	36.28%
New Democratic	15.85%
Social Credit	2.32%
Others	0.59%

Seats summary
PC	63.16%
Liberal	22.81%
New Democratic	12.28%
Social Credit	1.75%

=== Northern Manitoba ===
Electoral district	Candidates			Incumbent
Electoral district	PC	Liberal	NDP	Incumbent
Churchill	Gordon Beard; 2,170	Francis Jobin; 1,973		John Ingebrigtson
Flin Flon	Charles Witney; 2,375	Eli Ross; 1,175	Fred Ledieu; 448	Charles Witney
Rupertsland	Joseph Jeannotte; 2,329	Reginald McKay; 515	Thomas Hamilton; 461	Joseph Jeannotte
The Pas	John Carroll; 2,484	Adam Deminick; 1,497	Rachael Schewchuk; 430	John Carroll

=== Southern Manitoba ===
Electoral district	Candidates				Incumbent
Electoral district	PC	Liberal	NDP	Social Credit	Incumbent
Arthur	J. Douglas Watt; 2,629	Harry Patmore; 1,861			J. Douglas Watt
Birtle-Russell	Robert Smellie; 2,676	Victor Fulton; 1,701	Arnold Minish; 704		Robert Smellie
Brandon	Reginald Lissaman; 4,771	James Creighton; 3,182	Hans Fries; 1542	Harold Wright; 535	Reginald Lissaman
Brokenhead	Richard Mulder; 1,314	Max Dubas; 971	Ed Schreyer; 1,910		Ed Schreyer
Carillon	Peter Thiessen; 1,278	Leonard Barkman; 2,116		Edward Dubois; 811	Edmond Prefontaine
Cypress	Thelma Forbes; 2,746	Welland Stonehouse; 1,928		Charles Turner; 267	Thelma Forbes
Dauphin	Stewart McLean; 3,247	John Seale; 1,801			Stewart McLean
Dufferin	William Homer Hamilton; 2,542	R.G. Douglas; 1,309			William Homer Hamilton
Emerson	Michael Sokolyk; 1,964	John Tanchak; 2,545			John Tanchak
Ethelbert Plains	James Crowe; 1,376	Michael Hryhorczuk; 1,930	A. Clifford Matthews; 706		Michael Hryhorczuk
Fisher	Emil Moeller; 1,410	Arthur Dublin; 1,076	Peter Wagner; 1,323		Peter Wagner
Gimli	George Johnson; 2,316	Don Martin; 794	Magnus Eliason; 917		George Johnson
Gladstone	Jack McPhedran; 2,020	Nelson Shoemaker; 2,868	Fred Cooks; 249		Nelson Shoemaker
Hamiota	Barry Strickland; 2,573	Frank Taylor; 2,015	M.S. Antonation; 329		Barry Strickland
Lac du Bonnet	Oscar Bjornson; 1,740	John Ateah; 1,264	John Bracken; 843		Oscar Bjornson
Lakeside	John Frederick Bate; 1,452	Douglas Campbell; 2,009	H.C. Alfen; 207		Douglas Campbell
La Verendrye	Rene Prefontaine; 1,086	Albert Vielfaure; 1,394		Raymond Thuot; 719	Stan Roberts
Minnedosa	Walter Weir; 2,828	Frank Anderson; 1,536	John Lee; 472	C.V. Hutton; 456	Walter Weir
Morris	Harry Shewman; 1,648	Phil Perron; 1,126		Wilbur Tinkler; 609	Harry Shewman
Pembina	Carolyne Morrison; 2,436	Charles Cousins; 2,225			Carolyne Morrison
Portage la Prairie	John Christianson; 2,124	Gordon Johnston; 2,414	Francis Mason; 220		John Christianson
Rhineland	A.J. Thissen; 1,478	J.H. Pennber; 791		Jacob Froese; 1,511	Jacob Froese
Roblin	Keith Alexander; 2,205	Charles Filowich; 1,530	Ray Taylor; 645		Keith Alexander
Rock Lake	Abram Harrison; 2,444	Harry Parsonage; 2,015	J.A. Potter; 257		Abram Harrison
Rockwood-Iberville	George Hutton; 2,594	C.E. Crawford; 1,256	Samuel Cranston; 471		George Hutton
St. George	John Hjalmasson; 1,210	Elman Guttormson; 2,451			Elman Guttormson
Ste. Rose	J.A. Fletcher; 1,467	Gildas Molgat; 2,648	Leon Hoefer; 147		Gildas Molgat
Selkirk	Ben Massey; 1,527	Thomas P. Hillhouse; 2,104	Robert Luining; 579		Thomas P. Hillhouse
Souris-Lansdowne	Malcolm McKellar; 2,471	D.L. Barclay; 1,532			Malcolm McKellar
Springfield	Fred Klym; 1,993	William Lucko; 1,562		Harold Patzer; 429	Fred Klym
Swan River	James Bilton; 2,350	Elmir Simms; 1,004	M.G. Hofford; 718		Albert H.C. Corbett
Turtle Mountain	Peter J. McDonald; 2,788	Edward Dow; 1,973		C.R. Baskerville; 691	Edward Dow
Virden	Donald McGregor; 2,828	Malcolm McGregor; 1,323		J.J. Morton; 450	John Thompson

=== Winnipeg ===
Electoral district	Candidates				Incumbent
Electoral district	PC	Liberal	NDP	Other	Incumbent
Assiniboia	George Johnson; 2,993	Stephen Patrick; 3,232	Al Mackling; 1,978		George Johnson
Burrows	Peter Okrainec; 747	Mark Smerchanski; 1,791	John Hawryluk; 1,502	Andrew Bileski (Comm.); 517	John Hawryluk
Elmwood	Don Thompson; 1,737	John Kozoriz; 1,815	Steve Peters; 2,024		Steve Peters
Fort Garry	Sterling Lyon; 4,721	David Bowles; 2,828	Cliff Brownridge; 1,168		Sterling Lyon
Fort Rouge	Gurney Evans; 3,507	Brock McArthur; 2,128	William Reid; 990		Gurney Evans
Inkster	Mary Wayrykaw; 1,497	John Shanski; 2,081	Morris Gray; 2,658		Morris Gray
Kildonan	James Mills; 3,176	Ernie Rudolph; 2,751	A.J. Reid; 3,172	John De Fehr (SC); 452	A.J. Reid
Logan	Uberta Blackburn; 1,126	Thomas Blaine; 1,006	Lemuel Harris; 1,462		Lemuel Harris
Osborne	Obie Baizley; 3,025	Robert E. Moffat; 1,871	Jim Buchanan; 1,523		Obie Baizley
Radisson	Nelson McLean; 2,712	Nick Slotek; 3,169	Russell Paulley; 4,032		Russell Paulley
River Heights	Maitland Steinkopf; 5,044	Roy Matas; 3,941			W.B. Scarth
St. Boniface	Brunelle Leveille; 1,937	Laurent Desjardins; 4,175	Ian Wright; 662		Laurent Desjardins
St. James	Douglas Stanes; 2,707	Dave Johnston; 2,202	William Hardy; 1,239		Douglas Stanes
St. Johns	M. Baryluk; 1,236	Ed Pollack; 1,229	Saul Cherniack; 1,796	Saul Simkin (Comm.); 299; F.P. Bashchak (Ind.-Lib.-Lab.); 111; Sam Bordman (Ind.); 54	David Orlikow
St. Matthews	William Martin; 2,485	Don Cook; 1,771	Gordon Fines; 1,386		William Martin
St. Vital	Fred Groves; 3,626	Doug Honeyman; 2,605	Clare Martineau; 1,023	Fred Brennan (Ind.); 795	Fred Groves
Seven Oaks	Jack Chapman; 2,635	Calvin Scarfe; 1,600	Arthur E. Wright; 3,095		Arthur E. Wright
Wellington	Richard Seaborn; 2,422	Gurzon Havey; 1,391	Lloyd Stinson; 2,202		Richard Seaborn
Winnipeg Centre	James Cowan; 2,779	Frank Lamont; 1,684	Donovan Swailes; 1,016		James Cowan
Wolseley	Dufferin Roblin; 3,207	Russ Davis; 1,559	Ed Stefaniuk; 798		Dufferin Roblin

=== By-elections 1962 to 1966 ===
Manitoba provincial by-election, September 30, 1964: River Heights Resignation of Maitland Steinkopf
Party	Candidate	Votes	%	±%
Progressive Conservative	Maitland Steinkopf	4,963	52.57	-3.57
Liberal	Scott Wright	4,478	47.43	+3.57
Total valid votes		9,441	100	
Progressive Conservative hold		Swing		−3.57

== See also ==
- List of Manitoba political parties

Preceded by 1959 Manitoba election	List of Manitoba elections	Succeeded by 1966 Manitoba election
