= New Democratic Party of Manitoba =

Provincial political party in Canada

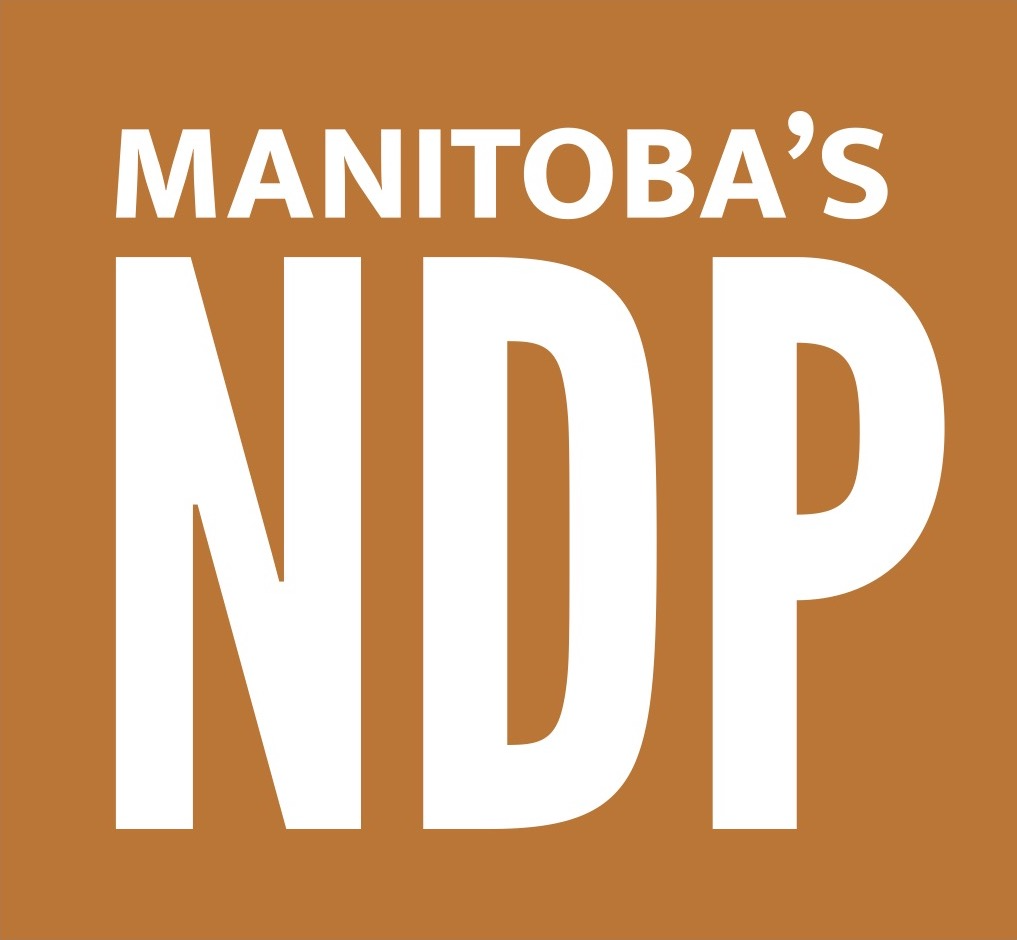
- Abbreviation: Manitoba NDP
- Leader: Wab Kinew
- President: Jill Stockwell
- Founded: 1961, predecessor Co-operative Commonwealth Federation founded in 1932
- Preceded by: Co-operative Commonwealth Federation (Manitoba)
- Headquarters: 878 Portage Avenue; Winnipeg, Manitoba; R3G 0P1
- Youth wing: Manitoba Young New Democrats
- Membership (2017): 10,134
- Ideology: Social democracy
- Political position: Centre-left
- National affiliation: New Democratic Party
- Colours: Orange
- Seats in Legislature: 34 / 57

Website
- www.mbndp.ca

The New Democratic Party of Manitoba (Manitoba NDP; French: Nouveau Parti démocratique du Manitoba), branded as Manitoba's NDP, is a social democratic political party in Manitoba, Canada. It is the provincial section of the federal New Democratic Party, and is a successor to the Manitoba Co-operative Commonwealth Federation. It is currently the governing party in Manitoba.

== Formation and early years ==
In the federal election of 1958, the national Co-operative Commonwealth Federation (CCF) was reduced to only eight seats in the House of Commons of Canada. The CCF's leadership restructured the party during the next three years, and in 1961 it merged with the Canadian Labour Congress to create the New Democratic Party (NDP).

Most provincial wings of the CCF also transformed themselves into "New Democratic Party" organisations before the year was over, with Saskatchewan as the only exception. There was very little opposition to the change in Manitoba, and the Manitoba NDP was formally constituted on November 4, 1961. Future Manitoba NDP leader Howard Pawley was one of the few CCF members to oppose the change. Outgoing CCF leader Russell Paulley easily won the new party's leadership, defeating two minor figures who offered little in the way of policy alternatives. For all intents and purposes, the CCF caucus in the Manitoba Legislative Assembly became the NDP caucus.

The NDP did not initially achieve an electoral breakthrough in Manitoba, falling from eleven seats to seven in the provincial election of 1962. They recovered to ten seats in the 1966 election, but still failed to challenge Dufferin Roblin's Progressive Conservative government seriously.

== Modern era ==
=== Party leadership contest in 1968 ===
Many in the NDP considered Paulley's leadership a liability, especially after the 1966 election. Paulley was known as an old-style labour politician, and could not appeal to the broader constituency base that the party needed for an electoral breakthrough. In 1968, he was challenged for the party leadership by Sidney Green, a labour lawyer from north-end Winnipeg.

The 1968 leadership challenge was unusual, in that many of Paulley's supporters wanted him to resign the following year so that he could be replaced by federal member of Parliament (MP) Edward Schreyer. Some also regarded the challenge as reflecting ideological divisions in the party, with Green depicted as a candidate of the radical left. Green's supporters tended to be from the party's youth wing, while Paulley was supported by the party establishment and organized labour.

Paulley won the challenge 213 votes to 168 and resigned the following year. Edward Schreyer entered the contest to replace him and defeated Green by 506 votes to 177.

=== Provincial election of 1969 ===
The NDP won 28 of 57 seats in the 1969 election and formed a minority government after gaining the support of maverick Manitoba Liberal Party member of the Legislative Assembly (MLA) Laurent Desjardins. Although the party had been expected to increase its parliamentary presence, its sudden victory was a surprise to most political observers.

The question of leadership was important to the NDP's victory. After Dufferin Roblin resigned as Premier of Manitoba in 1967, the Progressive Conservatives chose Walter Weir as his replacement. While Roblin was a Red Tory, Weir was from the party's rural conservative wing, and alienated many urban and centrist to centre-left voters who had previously supported the Tories. The Liberals, for their part, called former cabinet minister Robert Bend out of a decade-long retirement to lead the party before the election. Like Weir, Bend was a rural populist who had difficulty appealing to urban voters.

Schreyer, by contrast, was a centrist within the NDP. He was not ideologically committed to democratic socialism, and was in many respects more similar to federal Liberal Prime Minister Pierre Trudeau than to the province's traditional NDP leadership. He was also the first of Manitoba's social-democratic leaders who was not from an Anglo-Saxon and Protestant background. A Catholic of German–Austrian descent from rural Manitoba, he appealed to constituencies that were not previously inclined to support the NDP.

=== Early years in power ===
During the years of NDP government, major tax and social reforms were carried out, a major hydroelectricity development project was launched in the north of Manitoba, while the province spent heavily on public housing. Schreyer's first administration introduced several important changes to the province. It amalgamated the city of Winnipeg, introduced public auto insurance, and significantly reduced Medicare premiums. Schreyer's cabinet was divided on providing provincial funding for denominational schools (Green led the opposition to any such funding) but resolved the issue by a compromise. The government also continued energy development projects in northern Manitoba.

Schreyer's government was re-elected with a parliamentary majority in the 1973 provincial election. His second ministry was less ambitious on policy matters than was his first, though the government did introduce a new tax on mining resources. In the 1977 election, the Tories under former cabinet minister Sterling Lyon upset Schreyer's New Democrats.

Schreyer resigned as party leader in 1979, after being appointed Governor General of Canada. Howard Pawley was chosen as interim leader over Sidney Green and Saul Cherniack in a caucus vote. He later defeated Muriel Smith and Russell Doern to win the party's leadership at a delegated convention. Green left the NDP soon thereafter, claiming "the trade union movement and militant feminists" had taken control of the party. In 1981, Green formed the Progressive Party of Manitoba, joined by New Democratic MLAs Ben Hanuschak and Bud Boyce.

Despite these defections, Pawley's New Democrats won a majority government in the 1981 election. Pawley's government introduced progressive labour legislation and entrenched French language services in Manitoba's parliamentary and legal systems. Doern, who had served as a cabinet minister in Schreyer's government, left the NDP in 1984 on the language issue.

=== Declining popularity in the late 1980s ===
The New Democrats were re-elected with a narrow majority in the 1986 election. Over the next two years, the party suffered a significant decline in its popularity. Auto insurance premiums rose significantly during this period, and the government's support for the Meech Lake Accord also alienated some voters. Future party leader Gary Doer has claimed that an internal party poll put the NDP at only 6% popular support in early 1988.

Early in 1988, disgruntled NDP backbencher Jim Walding voted with the opposition against his government's budget. This defection brought about the government's defeat in the house and forced a new election before the NDP could recover its support base. Pawley immediately resigned as party leader, though he continued to lead a caretaker administration as premier.

Gary Doer narrowly defeated Len Harapiak on the third ballot of the leadership convention which followed. Doer declined to be sworn in as premier after the convention.

The Pawley government's achievements included the construction of the Limestone hydro project in northern Manitoba, and the enactment of the Manitoba Human Rights Code which included, for the first time in Manitoba, protection against discrimination on the basis of sexual orientation.

=== Electoral defeat and years in opposition (1988–1999) ===
The NDP was defeated in the 1988 election, winning only 12 seats out of 57. Led by Gary Filmon, the Tories won 25 seats, and the Liberal Party under Sharon Carstairs won 20 seats to supplant the NDP as the official opposition. Most of the NDP's seats were in north-end Winnipeg and the north of the province. Doer was not personally blamed for his party's poor performance and remained as leader.

Filmon called another provincial election in 1990 to seek a majority mandate. He was successful, but Doer brought the NDP back to official opposition status with 20 seats, benefiting from a strong personal showing at the leaders' debate.

The NDP began the 1995 election well behind the Tories and Liberals, but received a last-minute surge in popular support and came very close to forming government. The party won 23 seats, with the Liberals falling to only three.

Filmon's Tories lost much of their popular support between 1995 and 1999, due to increased unemployment, the privatization of Manitoba Telecom Services (MTS; now Bell MTS) and a vote-manipulation scandal in the 1995 election. Voters were also unnerved by Filmon's announcement that his government would undertake a further shift to the right if reelected. With the Liberals suffering from internal divisions, the NDP could present themselves as the only viable alternative. The 1999 election was considered too close to call until election day, but the NDP benefited from a decline in Liberal support and won 32 seats to form a majority government. After eleven years when the NDP was in opposition, Doer was sworn in as premier.

=== Return to government (1999–2016) ===
==== Doer government ====
The Doer government did not introduce as many radical initiatives as the Schreyer and Pawley governments, though it retained the NDP's traditional support for organized labour. Manitoba had the lowest unemployment rate in Canada as of 2004, and Doer's government remained generally popular with the electorate.

In the 2003 election, the NDP were re-elected with 35 seats and almost 50% of the popular vote, an impressive result in a three-party system. Doer was re-elected in his northeast-Winnipeg riding of Concordia with over 75% of the popular vote, and the NDP also made inroads into traditional Tory bastions in south-end Winnipeg.

Doer became the only NDP premier in Manitoba history to capture a third majority when his party was re-elected during the 2007 provincial election. It increased its seat count again to 36. Again, support was gathered from the southern and western areas of Winnipeg which were traditionally thought to be safe for the Progressive Conservatives.

Under Doer, the NDP ran a moderate government that introduced a succession of balanced budgets. Doer's first budget, delivered in 2000, removed 15,000 low-income Manitobans from the tax rolls and introduced $150 million in tax breaks over three years while projecting a $10 million surplus. His 2003 budget, the last of his first term, reduced provincial taxes by $82.7 million and increased spending by about 5%, mostly in health and education.

Despite a series of economic setbacks, the government posted another balanced budget in 2004 through increased taxes and drug premiums as well as civil service reduction through attrition. Tobacco and liquor taxes were increased and the provincial sales tax expanded to cover more services, although Doer rejected a panel recommendation to increase the sales tax by 1%.

The government introduced a more expansive budget in 2005 after an infusion of federal revenues, reducing personal and property taxes, increasing spending by 3.5% and putting $314 million into a "rainy day" fund. Doer's 2006 and 2007 budgets introduced further tax cuts; the 2007 budget also offered increased education spending and a new child benefit to assist low-income families.

At the Manitoba NDP's March 2009 convention, Doer announced that Manitoba would continue its commitment to education, training and research despite a global economic downturn and a slowing economy. He argued that the province was still recovering from the Filmon government's spending cuts during the economic downtown of the 1990s and that his policies would allow Manitoba to emerge from the recession in a strong, competitive position. His government introduced a balanced budget with economic stimulus programs a few weeks later, even as the global recession forced other provincial governments across Canada into deficit.

==== Selinger government ====
After leading the party for over two decades, Doer retired as premier and leader of the NDP on 27 August 2009. The following day, Stephen Harper, the prime minister of Canada, nominated him to become Canadian Ambassador to the United States. Following Doer's retirement, Finance Minister Greg Selinger became leader of the party at the leadership convention in October 2009. Despite gloomy predictions, Selinger led the NDP to its fourth straight majority government in the October 2011 general election, surpassing Doer's record and winning 37 seats.

In April 2013, the Selinger government broke an earlier promise not to increase the provincial sales tax. It instead implemented a 1-percentage-point increase in the sales tax from 7% to 8%, which resulted in a precipitous decline in popular support, in addition to record deficits and massive interest payments for debt services, for the government and, ultimately, a caucus revolt against Selinger's leadership culminating in the resignation of five cabinet ministers. Due in part to the unpopularity of the tax increase, the NDP fell far behind the Progressive Conservatives in public opinion polls and did not recover for years afterward. In the fall of 2014, several cabinet ministers privately asked Selinger to resign in hopes that the party would recover under a new leader. However, Selinger declined. In September 2014, during a caucus retreat, several MLAs openly told Selinger that he needed to resign. However, he refused again. A month later, at the end of October, Jennifer Howard, (Fort Rouge), minister of finance, Stan Struthers (Dauphin), minister of municipal government, Theresa Oswald (Seine River), minister for jobs and the economy, Andrew Swan (Minto), minister of justice and Erin Selby (Southdale), minister of health, and several senior party officials went public with their call for Selinger's resignation. On November 3, the five ministers resigned from cabinet due to their opposition to Selinger's continued leadership. They did, however, remain in the NDP caucus as backbench MLAs. Selinger responded on November 9 by asking the party executive to hold a leadership election during the party's annual convention scheduled for March 6–8, 2015, stating his intention to be a candidate. The party executive subsequently agreed. Theresa Oswald, one of the five rebel ex-ministers, challenged Selinger for the leadership, as did Minister of Infrastructure and Transportation Steve Ashton, who had not vocally opposed Selinger but who resigned from cabinet to enter the leadership contest. At the March 8, 2015 leadership election, Ashton was eliminated on the first ballot and Selinger prevailed on the second ballot with 50.93% of ballots cast, defeating Oswald by 33 votes.

After trailing in opinion polling for almost four years, the NDP was heavily defeated at the April 19, 2016 provincial election. It dropped to only 14 seats, the party's worst showing since 1988. Notably, it lost several previously safe seats by wide margins. The Progressive Conservatives under Brian Pallister were elected to a majority government. Selinger announced his intention to resign as party leader in his concession speech. Logan MLA Flor Marcelino was named interim leader on May 7, 2016.

=== Kinew leadership (2017–present) ===
Prominent Indigenous broadcaster and first-term MLA Wab Kinew was elected as permanent leader at the 2017 leadership convention. He won over 70% of the votes cast and defeated former cabinet minister Steve Ashton, who had lost his seat at the 2016 election.

Kinew led the Manitoba NDP into the 2019 provincial election, which Premier Brian Pallister called early to avoid conflict with the celebrations planned in 2020 for the 150th anniversary of Manitoba joining Confederation. While the party increased its share of the popular vote and gained six seats in Winnipeg and the Northern Regions of the province, the PCs were re-elected with a slightly smaller majority government than before the election. The new 18-member NDP caucus was sworn in on September 27, 2019, and the new positions in the shadow cabinet were announced later that day.

Kinew stayed as Manitoba NDP leader and led them into the 2023 election, with the party leading the Progressive Conservatives in polls for most of the term. The party won a majority government with 34 seats, mainly on the strength of taking all but four seats in Winnipeg: Fort Whyte, Roblin, Tuxedo, and Tyndall Park. Kinew became the first provincial premier of First Nations descent.

== Membership ==
Like its federal counterpart, the Manitoba NDP has historically had more long-term members than other registered parties in the province. It also has fewer short-term members who are signed up to influence nomination contests.

== Party leaders ==
† denotes interim or acting leader

=== CCF ===
#	Name	Highest Position	Tenure	Notes
1	Seymour Farmer	Leader of the Opposition	1936–1947	
2	Edwin Hansford	Party Leader	1947–1952	
†	William "Scottie" Bryce	Party Leader	1952–1952	Acting leader
3	Lloyd Stinson	Party Leader	1952–1960	
4	Russell Paulley	Party Leader	1960–1961	

=== NDP ===
#	Name	Highest Position	Tenure	Notes
1	Russell Paulley	Party Leader	November 4, 1961 – June 7, 1969	
2	Edward Schreyer	Premier	June 7, 1969 – January 22, 1979	First social democratic Premier of Manitoba, later appointed Governor General of Canada
3	Howard Pawley	Premier	January 22, 1979 – March 30, 1988	interim leader until Nov. 4, 1979
4	Gary Doer	Premier	March 30, 1988 – October 17, 2009	Resigned to become Canadian Ambassador to the U.S.
5	Greg Selinger	Premier	October 17, 2009 – May 7, 2016	
†	Flor Marcelino	Leader of the Opposition	May 7, 2016 – September 16, 2017	interim leader
6	Wab Kinew	Premier	September 16, 2017 – present	

== Election results ==
=== Legislative Assembly ===
Election	Leader	Votes	%	Seats	+/−	Position	Status
1936	Seymour Farmer		12.0	7 / 55	▲7	▲3rd	Third party
1941	Seymour Farmer		17.0	3 / 55	▼4	3rd	Third party
1945	Seymour Farmer	73,988	33.8	9 / 55	▲6	3rd	Opposition
1949	Edwin Hansford		25.6	7 / 57	▼2	3rd	Third party
1953	Lloyd Stinson	44,332	16.56	5 / 57	▼2	3rd	Third party
1958	Lloyd Stinson		20.0	11 / 57	▲6	3rd	Third party
1959	Lloyd Stinson	68,149	21.8	10 / 57	▼1	3rd	Third party
1962	Russell Paulley	47,304	15.20	7 / 57	▼3	3rd	Third party
1966	Russell Paulley	130,102	23.14	11 / 57	▲4	3rd	Third party
1969	Edward Schreyer	128,080	38.27	28 / 57	▲17	▲1st	Minority
1973	Edward Schreyer	197,585	42.31	31 / 57	▲3	1st	Majority
1977	Edward Schreyer	188,124	38.62	23 / 57	▼8	▼2nd	Opposition
1981	Howard Pawley	228,784	47.38	34 / 57	▲11	▲1st	Majority
1986	Howard Pawley	198,261	41.50	30 / 57	▼4	1st	Majority
1988	Gary Doer	126,954	23.62	12 / 57	▼18	▼3rd	Third party
1990	Gary Doer	141,328	28.80	20 / 57	▲8	▲2nd	Opposition
1995	Gary Doer	165,489	32.81	23 / 57	▲3	2nd	Opposition
1999	Gary Doer	219,679	44.51	32 / 57	▲9	▲1st	Majority
2003	Gary Doer	195,425	49.47	35 / 57	▲3	1st	Majority
2007	Gary Doer	200,834	47.73	36 / 57	▲1	1st	Majority
2011	Greg Selinger	199,069	46.16	37 / 57	▲1	1st	Majority
2016	Greg Selinger	112,562	25.74	14 / 57	▼23	▼2nd	Opposition
2019	Wab Kinew	149,868	31.38	18 / 57	▲4	2nd	Opposition
2023	Wab Kinew	221,363	45.63	34 / 57	▲16	▲1st	Majority

== Current Manitoba NDP MLAs ==
Member	District	Elected
Uzoma Asagwara	Union Station	2019
Tyler Blashko	Lagimodière	2023
Diljeet Brar	Burrows	2019
Ian Bushie	Keewatinook	2019
Renée Cable	Southdale	2023
Jennifer Chen	Fort Richmond	2023
Carla Compton	Tuxedo	2024
Shannon Corbett	Transcona	2025
Billie Cross	Seine River	2023
Jelynn Dela Cruz	Radisson	2023
Jasdeep Devgan	McPhillips	2023
Jennifer Flett	The Pas-Kameesak	2026
Nahanni Fontaine	St. Johns	2016
Nellie Kennedy	Assiniboia	2023
Wab Kinew (Note: Premier, 2023–present)	Fort Rouge	2016
Ron Kostyshyn	Dauphin	2011 (Note: Representing Swan River; out of the legislature, 2016–2023.)
Tom Lindsey (Note: Speaker, 2023–present)	Flin Flon	2016
Robert Loiselle	St. Boniface	2023
Jim Maloway (Note: Out of the legislature, 2008–2011)	Elmwood	1986
Malaya Marcelino	Notre Dame	2019
Mike Moroz	River Heights	2023
Jamie Moses	St. Vital	2019
Mike Moyes	Riel	2023
Lisa Naylor	Wolseley	2019
Logan Oxenham	Kirkfield Park	2023
David Pankratz	Waverley	2023
Eric Redhead	Thompson	2022
Adrien Sala	St. James	2019
Mintu Sandhu	The Maples	2019
Rachelle Schott	Kildonan-River East	2023
Tracy Schmidt	Rossmere	2023
Glen Simard	Brandon East	2023
Bernadette Smith	Point Douglas	2017
Matt Wiebe	Concordia	2010

== See also ==
- New Democratic Party of Manitoba leadership elections
