= William Scraba =

Canadian politician

William Scraba (March 4, 1907 – April 18, 1971) was a politician in Manitoba, Canada. He served in the Legislative Assembly of Manitoba from 1945 to 1949 as a representative of the Liberal-Progressive Party.

He was born in Dominion City, Manitoba, the son of Peter Scraba and Tena Procopchuk. Before his career in provincial politics, Scraba served on the Winnipeg City Council as a member of the conservative Civic Election Committee and on the Winnipeg School Board. He was a businessman in the city and was a member of the Ukrainian Professional Businessmen's Club.

Scraba was elected to the Manitoba legislature in the 1945 provincial election, in the ten-member constituency of Winnipeg. During this period, Winnipeg elected ten members to the legislative assembly by a single transferable ballot. Scraba finished ninth on the first count, and secured the tenth and final seat on the fifteenth count, narrowly edging out Progressive Conservative Morley Lougheed. He served as a backbench supporter of Premiers Stuart Garson and Douglas Campbell over the next four years.

Winnipeg's electoral map was changed for the 1949 provincial election, as the single ten-member constituency was replaced with three separate four-member constituencies. Scraba ran for re-election as an "Independent Liberal-Progressive" in Winnipeg North, but was defeated. He finished sixth on the first count, and was eliminated on the seventh count.

Scraba moved to Toronto in 1960 and died there eleven years later.
