= 1949 Manitoba general election =

- November 10, 1949

57 seats of the Legislative Assembly of Manitoba 29 seats needed for a majority
	First party	Second party	Third party
Leader	Douglas Campbell	Errick Willis	Edwin Hansford
Party	Liberal–Progressive	Progressive Conservative	Co-operative Commonwealth
Leader since	November 13, 1948	June 9, 1936	1948
Leader's seat	Lakeside	Turtle Mountain	St. Boniface
Last election	25	13	9
Seats won	31	19	7
Seat change	▲6	▼4	▼2
Percentage	38.70%	19.013%	25.6%
Swing	▲6.50%	▲3.10%	▼8.2%
Premier before election
Douglas Lloyd Campbell
Liberal–Progressive
Premier after election
Douglas Lloyd Campbell
Liberal–Progressive

The 1949 Manitoba general election was held on November 10, 1949, to elect Members of the Legislative Assembly of the Province of Manitoba, Canada.

This election pitted the province's coalition government, made up of the Liberal-Progressive Party and the Progressive Conservative Party, against a variety of opponents.

The social democratic Manitoba Co-operative Commonwealth Federation (CCF) was the coalition's primary challenger, while the communist Labour Progressive Party and an assortment of independent candidates also challenged the coalition in some constituencies.

Liberal-Progressive and Progressive Conservative candidates ran against each other in some ridings, generally where no anti-coalition candidates had a serious chance of winning.

The result was a landslide victory for the coalition. Premier Douglas Campbell's Liberal-Progressives remained the dominant party in government, increasing their caucus to thirty-one seats out of fifty-seven—enough to form a majority government even without assistance from other parties. One of these candidates was elected simply as a "Liberal", but sat as a full member of the Liberal-Progressive caucus.

The Progressive Conservative Party, led by Errick Willis, remained the junior partner in government, falling to nine seats from thirteen in the previous election. Five independent "Conservative" or "Progressive Conservative" candidates were also elected, with all but one opposing the coalition government. These results provoked serious debate in the Progressive Conservative Party about the wisdom of staying with the coalition.

The CCF under Edwin Hansford fell to seven seats, down from nine in the previous election. Bill Kardash of the LPP retained his seat in north-end Winnipeg. Three pro-coalition independents were also elected, as was Edmond Prefontaine, an independent Liberal opposing the coalition.

The Social Credit League did not contest the election, having fallen into a state of internal disorganization.

Winnipeg had 12 seats filled through Single Transferable Voting, with four members elected in each of three Winnipeg districts. St. Boniface had two seats filled through STV.

The other districts elected one MLA each through Alternative Voting, where a candidate had to have majority of the votes to be elected. In Iberville, Morris and Rhineland, where no candidate had the majority in the First Count, only the First Count totals are shown - the final vote count and the intermediate counts are not. In all three cases, the leader in the first count was elected. Instant runoff voting thus made no change to who would have been elected versus who would have been elected under First past the post.

== Results ==
Manitoba general election (November 10, 1949)
Party	Leader	First-preference votes			Seats			
Party	Leader	Votes	% FPv	± (pp)	Cand.	1941	Elected	Change
**Coalition candidates**								
█ Liberal–Progressive	Douglas Campbell	75,291	38.2	6.0▲	44	25	30	5▲
█ Progressive Conservative	Errick Willis	23,410	11.9	4.0▼	16	13	9	4▼
█ Independent		7,452	3.8	0.9▲	5	3	4	1▲
█ Liberal		4,311	2.2	1.8▲	1	–	1	1▲
█ Independent Liberal-Progressive		2,625	1.3	0.2▼	1	–	–	–
█ Independent-Liberal		1,015	0.5	0.1▲	1	–	–	–
█ Social Credit		–	–	1.3▼	–	2	–	2▼
**Anti-Coalition candidates**								
█ Co-operative Commonwealth	Seymour Farmer	49,933	25.3	8.5▼	25	9	7	2▼
█ Progressive Conservative		9,696	4.9	4.9▲	4	–	3	3▲
█ Independent		6,892	3.5	0.8▼	4	1	–	1▼
█ Labor–Progressive		5,243	2.7	2.1▲	2	1	1	Steady
█ Independent-PC		5,044	2.6	2.6▲	2	–	1	1▲
█ Independent-Liberal		4,094	2.1	2.1▲	3	–	–	–
█ Independent-CCF		1,171	0.6	1.4▼	1	1	–	1▼
█ Independent Liberal-Progressive		860	0.4	0.4▲	1	–	1	1▲
█ Independent Labour		99	–	–	1	–	–	–
█ Social Credit		–	–	0.7▼	–	–	–	–
█ Socialist		–	–	0.1▼	–	–	–	–
Valid		197,136	100.0	–	111	55	57	2▲
Rejected		2,540						
Total votes cast		199,676						
Registered voters/Turnout (Note: Excludes constituencies where candidates returned by acclamation)		369,644	54.0					

=== Results by riding ===
Bold names indicate members returned by acclamation. Italicized names indicate Anti-Coalition candidates returned. Incumbents are marked with *.

Arthur: John R. Pitt*
Assiniboia: Reginald Wightman
Birtle: **Francis Bell***
Brandon City: Joseph Donaldson
Carillon: Edmond Prefontaine* (Note: Elected in 1945 as a Coalition candidate) (Ind-LP)
Cypress: James Christie*
Dauphin: Ernest McGirr
Deloraine-Glenwood: (Note: New single-member ridings arising from redistribution) **James O. Argue*** (Note: Previously MLA for Deloraine)
Dufferin: Walter McDonald*
Emerson: **John Solomon***
Ethelbert: Michael Sawchuk* (Note: Elected in 1945 under the CCF banner)
Fairford: **James Anderson*** (Note: Elected in byelection)
Fisher: Nicholas Bachynsky*
Gilbert Plains: Ray Mitchell
Gimli: **Steinn Thompson***
Gladstone: **William Morton***
Hamiota: Charles L. Shuttleworth
Iberville: John McDowell
Kildonan-Transcona: George Olive* (Note: Previously MLA for Springfield)
Killarney: Abram Harrison*
Lakeside: **Douglas Campbell***
Lansdowne: Thomas Seens
La Verendrye: Sauveur Marcoux*
Manitou-Morden: Hugh Morrison* (Note: Previously MLA for Manitou)
Minnedosa: Henry Rungay*
Morris: Harry Shewman
Mountain: **Ivan Schultz***
Norfolk-Beautiful Plains: Samuel Burch
Portage la Prairie: **Charles Greenlay***
Rhineland: **Wallace C. Miller**
Roblin: Ronald Robertson
Rockwood: Robert Bend
Rupertsland: **Daniel Hamilton***
Russell: Rodney Clement
St. Andrews: James McLenaghen* (Note: Previously MLA for Kildonan & St. Andrews)
St. Boniface: 'Joseph Van Belleghem
St. Boniface: Edwin Hansford
St. Clements: Nicholas Stryk
St. George: **Christian Halldorson***
Ste. Rose: **Maurice Dane MacCarthy***
Springfield: William Lucko
Swan River: George Renouf*
The Pas: Francis Jobin (Lib)
Turtle Mountain: **Errick Willis***
Virden: **Robert Mooney***
Winnipeg Centre: Paul Bardal
Winnipeg Centre: Charles Rhodes Smith*
Winnipeg Centre: Gordon Fines
Winnipeg Centre: Donovan Swailes*
Winnipeg North: Frank Chester
Winnipeg North: Morris Gray*
Winnipeg North: John Hawryluk
Winnipeg North: Bill Kardash*
Winnipeg South: John McDiarmid*
Winnipeg South: Ronald Turner*
Winnipeg South: Lloyd Stinson*
Winnipeg South: Dufferin Roblin (Ind-PC)

=== Multi-member constituencies ===
MLAs returned by party (multi-member constituencies)
Party	St. Boniface	Winnipeg Centre	Winnipeg North	Winnipeg South
Liberal–Progressive	1	2	1	2
Co-operative Commonwealth	1	2	2	1
Labor–Progressive			1	
Independent-PC				1
**Total**	2	4	4	4

==== St. Boniface ====
St. Boniface
Party	Candidate	FPv%	Count		
Party	Candidate	FPv%	1	2	3
Liberal–Progressive	**Joseph Van Belleghem** (Coalition)	26.77	3,936	4,055	**5,906**
Co-operative Commonwealth	(incumbent)**Edwin Hansford**	26.56	3,905	4,897	**5,206**
Progressive Conservative	Paul Marion (Anti-Coalition)	18.57	2,730	2,836	3,105
Liberal–Progressive	G.P. Shearer (Coalition)	18.01	2,647	2,681	
Co-operative Commonwealth	E.R. Gagnon	10.09	1,483		
Electorate: 29,981 Valid: 14,701 Spoilt: 237 Quota: 4,901 Turnout: 14,938 (49.82%)

St. Boniface (analysis of transferred votes, ranked in order of 1st preference votes)
Party	Candidate	Maximum round	Maximum votes	Share in maximum round	Maximum votes First round votes Transfer votes
Liberal-Progressive	Joseph Van Belleghem	3	5,906	41.54%	
Co-operative Commonwealth	Edwin Hansford	3	5,206	36.62%	
Progressive Conservative	Paul Marion	3	3,105	21.84%	
Liberal-Progressive	G.P. Shearer	2	2,681	18.53%	
Co-operative Commonwealth	E.R. Gagnon	1	1,483	10.09%	
Exhausted votes			484	3.29%	

==== Winnipeg Centre ====
Four to be elected.

Winnipeg Centre
Party	Candidate	FPv%	Count							
Party	Candidate	FPv%	1	2	3	4	5	6	7	8
Liberal–Progressive	(incumbent)**Charles Rhodes Smith** (Coalition)	25.01	**5,140**							
Co-operative Commonwealth	(incumbent)**Donovan Swailes**	24.45	5,025	**5,025**						
Progressive Conservative	Hank Scott (Coalition)	11.40	2,338	2,529	2,559	2,681	2,965	3,122	3,258	3,378
Co-operative Commonwealth	**Gordon Fines**	10.48	2,149	2,170	2,749	2,784	2,871	3,225	**4,321**	
Liberal–Progressive	**Paul Bardal** (Coalition)	8.97	1,839	2,448	2,478	2,903	3,193	3,279	3,444	**3,578**
Labor–Progressive	John McNeil	5.91	1,211	1,230	1,256	1,286	1,392			
Co-operative Commonwealth	Ina Thompson	5.45	1,117	1,146	1,366	1,396	1,491	1,741		
Independent Liberal	Stephen Juba (Coalition)	4.95	1,015	1,065	1,078	1,155				
Liberal–Progressive	J.H. Walker (Coalition)	3.27	621	830	845					
Electorate: 50,339 Valid: 20,555 Spoilt: 220 Quota: 4,112 Turnout: 20,775 (41.27%)

Winnipeg Centre (analysis of transferred votes, ranked in order of 1st preference votes)
Party	Candidate	Maximum round	Maximum votes	Share in maximum round	Maximum votes First round votes Transfer votes
Liberal-Progressive	Charles Rhodes Smith	1	5,140	25.01%	
Co-operative Commonwealth	Donovan Swailes	1	5,025	24.45%	
Progressive Conservative	Hank Scott	8	3,378	17.51%	
Co-operative Commonwealth	Gordon Fines	7	4,321	22.45%	
Liberal-Progressive	Paul Bardal	8	3,578	18.55%	
Labor-Progressive	John McNeil	5	1,392	6.91%	
Co-operative Commonwealth	Ina Thompson	6	1,741	8.89%	
Independent Liberal	Stephen Juba	4	1,155	5.65%	
Liberal-Progressive	J.H. Walker	3	845	4.11%	
Exhausted votes			1,263	6.14%	

==== Winnipeg North ====
Winnipeg North
Party	Candidate	FPv%	Count							
Party	Candidate	FPv%	1	2	3	4	5	6	7	8
Co-operative Commonwealth	(incumbent)**Morris Gray**	27.33	**6,718**							
Labor–Progressive	(incumbent)**Bill Kardash**	16.40	4,032	4,199	4,219	4,240	4,772	4,804	4,862	**5,204**
Liberal–Progressive	**Frank Chester** (Coalition)	14.85	3,649	3,714	3,923	4,035	4,107	4,501	4,824	**5,660**
Co-operative Commonwealth	**John Hawryluk**	7.88	1,938	2,569	2,616	2,678	3,497	3,700	4,316	**4,485**
Liberal–Progressive	John M. Kozoriz (Coalition)	7.33	1,804	1,818	1,868	1,914	1,935	2,110	2,681	2,809
Independent Liberal-Progressive	(incumbent)William Scraba (Coalition)	6.81	1,673	1,697	1,718	1,810	1,827	2,046		
Liberal–Progressive	Abe Simkin (Coalition)	6.54	1,607	2,139	2,227	2,243	2,270	2,351	2,411	
Progressive Conservative	Stan Carrick (Coalition)	4.58	1,126	1,149	1,211	1,369	1,384			
Co-operative Commonwealth	Herman Shaak	3.12	767	1,100	1,116	1,131				
Independent	Jerdry Wach (Coalition)	2.63	646	651	671					
Liberal–Progressive	Donald Callis	2.12	521	533						
Independent Labour	A.J. Yallits	0.40	99	104						
Electorate: 46,649 Valid: 24,580 Spoilt: 329 Quota: 4,917 Turnout: 24,909 (53.39%)

Winnipeg North (analysis of transferred votes, ranked in order of 1st preference votes)
Party	Candidate	Maximum round	Maximum votes	Share in maximum round	Maximum votes First round votes Transfer votes
Co-operative Commonwealth	Morris Gray	1	6,718	27.33%	
Labor-Progressive	Bill Kardash	8	5,204	22.55%	
Liberal-Progressive	Frank Chester	8	5,660	24.53%	
Co-operative Commonwealth	John Hawryluk	8	4,485	19.44%	
Liberal-Progressive	John M. Kozoriz	8	2,809	12.17%	
Independent Liberal-Progressive	William Scraba	4	2,046	8.38%	
Liberal-Progressive	Abe Simkin	7	2,411	10.04%	
Progressive Conservative	Stan Carrick	5	1,384	5.61%	
Co-operative Commonwealth	Herman Shaak	4	1,131	4.65%	
Independent	Jerdry Wach	3	671	2.74%	
Liberal-Progressive	Donald Callis	2	533	2.17%	
Independent Labour	A.J. Yallits	2	104	0.42%	
Exhausted votes			1,505	6.12%	

==== Winnipeg South ====
4 to be elected. Quota was 5522.

Winnipeg South
Party	Candidate	FPv%	Count				
Party	Candidate	FPv%	1	2	3	4	5
Liberal–Progressive	(incumbent)**John McDiarmid** (Coalition)	23.42	**6,466**	**5522**			
Co-operative Commonwealth	(incumbent)**Lloyd Stinson**	22.99	6,346	**6,346**	**5522**		
Liberal–Progressive	(incumbent)**Ronald Turner** (Coalition)	20.02	5,526	5,526	5,526	5,526	**5,526**
Independent Progressive Conservative	**Dufferin Roblin** (Anti-Coalition)	12.47	3,443	3,572	3,767	4,601	**5,557**
Independent	C.F. Green (Anti-Coalition)	8.51	2,349	2,444	2,833	3,151	3,959
Liberal–Progressive	J. Gurzon Harvey (Coalition)	6.30	1,739	2,320	2,447	3,003	
Progressive Conservative	(incumbent)Alex Stringer (Coalition)	6.30	1,738	1,877	1,990		
Electorate: 53,742 Valid: 27,607 Spoilt: 155 Quota: 5,522 Turnout: 27,762 (51.7%)

Winnipeg South (analysis of transferred votes, ranked in order of 1st preference votes)
Party	Candidate	Maximum round	Maximum votes	Share in maximum round	Maximum votes First round votes Transfer votes
Liberal-Progressive	John McDiarmid	1	6,466	23.42%	
Co-operative Commonwealth	Lloyd Stinson	1	6,346	22.99%	
Liberal-Progressive	Ronald Turner	1	5,526	20.02%	
Independent Progressive Conservative	Dufferin Roblin	5	5,557	21.30%	
Independent	C.F. Green	5	3,959	15.18%	
Liberal-Progressive	J. Gurzon Harvey	4	3,003	10.99%	
Progressive Conservative	Alex Stringer	3	1,990	7.21%	
Exhausted votes			1,521	5.51%	

== Post-election changes ==
On August 15, 1950, Progressive Conservative leader Errick Willis resigned his seat in cabinet. The party formally left the coalition later in the summer, and John McDowell, Hugh Morrison and Dufferin Roblin joined the party caucus.

Some Progressive Conservative MLAs opposed their party's decision, and chose to remain with the coalition side. Charles Greenlay and Wallace C. Miller chose to remain in cabinet, while James Argue and Joseph Donaldson sat as pro-coalition independents. Argue rejoined the Progressive Conservatives in 1953, while Donaldson resigned his seat. Thomas Seens did not initially support the party's decision to leave the coalition, but sat with the Progressive Conservatives in the legislature.

Ronald Robertson and Edmond Prefontaine rejoined the Liberal-Progressives, while independents Rod Clement and Walter Weir also remained on the government side. Harry Shewman appears to have sided with the opposition.

St. Andrews (dec. James McLenaghen, June 23, 1950), October 24, 1950:

- Thomas P. Hillhouse (LP) 2366
- William Earl Gordon (CCF) 1513
- Veitch (PC) 1187

St. Clements (dec. Nicholas Stryk, 1950), October 24, 1950:

- Albert Trapp (LP) 2729
- Wasylyk (CCF) 560
- Andrew Bileski (LPP) 254

Brandon City (res. Joseph Donaldson, April 18, 1951), January 21, 1952:

- Reginald Lissaman (PC) 3223
- Alex McPhail (LP) 2233
- Spafford (CCF) 1305

La Verendrye (dec. Sauveur Marcoux, November 16, 1951), January 21, 1952:

- Edmond Brodeur (LP) 2334
- Arpin (PC) 1363

Winnipeg South (res. Charles Rhodes Smith, 1952)

St. Clements (dec. Albert Trapp, January 9, 1953)

Cypress (dec. James Christie, January 19, 1953)

Virden (dec. Robert Mooney, January 30, 1953)

Ste. Rose (dec. Maurice MacCarthy, June 8, 1953)
