= Alex J. Stringer =

Canadian politician (1903–1969)

Alexander John Stringer (1903 – February 13, 1969) was a politician and judge in Manitoba, Canada. He was a member of the Legislative Assembly of Manitoba from 1946 to 1949, serving as a special representative of Manitobans in the Canadian Navy.

== Early life and career ==
Stringer was born in Whitehorse, Yukon in 1903. His father was the Reverend Isaac O. Stringer, a prominent member of the Anglican Church of Canada. Originally from King's County, Ireland, the elder Stringer later became Archbishop of Yukon.

Stringer received a Bachelor of Arts degree from the University of Toronto, and later a Bachelor of Laws degree from the University of Manitoba (1933). He was called to the Manitoba Bar in 1937, and became a barrister at law with the firm of Law, Thorvaldson & Co.

He served overseas with the Canadian Navy in World War II, attaining the rank of lieutenant commander.

== Public life ==
In January 1946, Manitoba held special elections for residents who were unable to cast ballots in the 1945 provincial election by virtue of having served overseas in World War II. Stringer was elected as the Navy representative, running as an independent supporter of Manitoba's coalition government (which included Liberal-Progressives, Progressive Conservatives and Social Credit members). After the election, he sat with the Progressive Conservative caucus in the Legislative Assembly of Manitoba.

He ran for re-election in the 1949 provincial election as a Progressive Conservative, and finished last in a field of seven candidates in the four-member constituency of Winnipeg South.

Stringer continued his legal practice until November 1, 1959, when he was appointed as Senior Judge of Juvenile and Family Court. He became known for his work in youth criminal justice reform, calling for more humane facilities for young offenders and for the separation of juveniles from adult criminals in provincial jails. He was a member of the John Howard Elizabeth Fry Society.

Stringer died on February 13, 1969, following an extended illness.
