= Manitoba Cooperative Commonwealth Federation candidates in the 1949 Manitoba provincial election =

The Manitoba Cooperative Commonwealth Federation was the primary opposition party in the 1949 provincial election, challenging the coalition government of Liberal-Progressives and Progressive Conservatives. Seven of the party's candidates were elected. Some CCF candidates have their own biography pages; information about others may be found here.

== William Earl Gordon (St. Andrews) ==
Gordon was born in Drayton, Ontario, and moved to Selkirk, Manitoba in 1919 to work as a Dominion Bank manager. He held this position until 1933, when he was appointed as town accountant. Gordon was also secretary-treasurer of the local Credit Union and of the St. Clements Agriculture Society, and was an honorary elder in the United Church. He stepped down from his accountant's position in 1946, and served as Mayor of Selkirk from 1948 until his resignation in 1950.

Gordon campaigned for the House of Commons of Canada in the 1935 federal election as a candidate of the Reconstruction Party of Canada. He finished fifth out of six candidates in Selkirk with 1,275 votes; the winner was Liberal-Progressive candidate Joseph T. Thorson.

He first ran for a seat in the Manitoba legislature in the 1949 provincial election, as the CCF candidate in St. Andrews against Progressive Conservative coalitionist James McLenaghen. He was defeated, receiving 1,652 votes (32.20%) in a straight two-way contest. McLenaghen died in 1950, and Gordon ran for the CCF a second time in a by-election held on October 24 of that year. He again finished second, this time to Liberal-Progressive candidate Thomas Hillhouse.

Gordon himself died on March 11, 1953, at age sixty-two.
