= Gilbert Grant =

Canadian politician

Gilbert Harrison Grant (1885 – July 16, 1972) was a politician in Manitoba, Canada. He served in the Legislative Assembly of Manitoba from 1945 to 1949 as a Liberal-Progressive.

Born in Milton, Ontario, Grant was educated in Granton and received a degree in pharmacy from Upper Canada College. He moved to Manitoba and operated drug stores in Brandon and then, after 1925, in Souris. Grant served as chairman of the Souris and Glenwood Hospital Board. He was a director and later vice-president for the Wawanesa Mutual Insurance Company.

Grant was elected to the Manitoba legislature in the 1945 provincial election, defeating a candidate of the Cooperative Commonwealth Federation by over 1,000 votes in the constituency of Glenwood. He served as a government backbencher for the next four years, supporting the ministries of Stuart Garson and Douglas Campbell. He did not run for re-election in 1949.

He died in Souris in 1972 and was buried in Brandon.
