= 1967 Winnipeg municipal election =

Election in Canada

The 1967 Winnipeg municipal election was held on October 25, 1967, to elect mayors, councillors and school trustees in the City of Winnipeg and its suburban communities. There was no mayoral election in Winnipeg itself.

== Results ==
=== Winnipeg ===
Robert Taft, Mark Danzker, Inez Trueman, Lloyd Stinson, William McGarva, Alan Wade, Slaw Rebchuk, Joseph Zuken and Donovan Swailes were elected to two-year terms on the Winnipeg city council. Ernest A. Brotman was elected to a one-year term.

=== St. Vital ===
1967 St. Vital municipal election: Mayor
Candidate	Votes	%
(x)Jack Hardy	accl.	
