= 1945 Manitoba general election =

- October 15, 1945

57 seats of the Legislative Assembly of Manitoba 29 seats needed for a majority
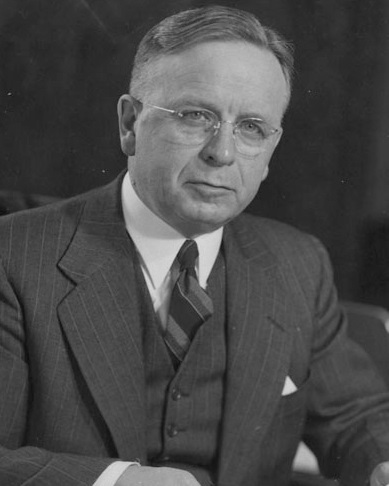

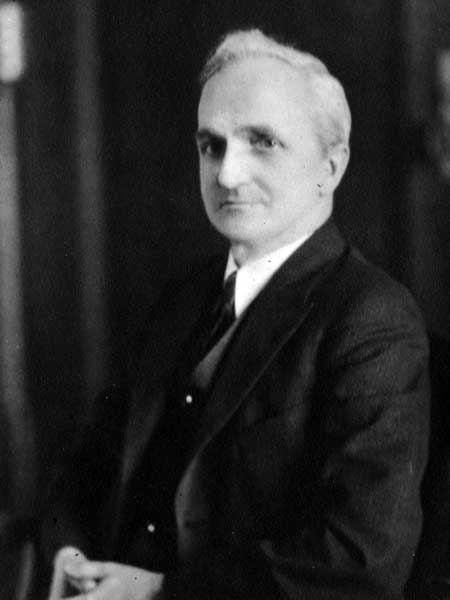
	First party	Second party	Third party
Leader	Stuart Garson	Errick Willis	Seymour Farmer
Party	Liberal–Progressive	Conservative	Co-operative Commonwealth
Leader since	January 14, 1943	June 9, 1936	1936
Leader's seat	Fairford	Turtle Mountain	Winnipeg
Last election	27	12	3
Seats won	25	13	9
Seat change	▼2	▲1	▲6
Popular vote	70,475	34,819	73,988
Percentage	32.2%	15.9%	33.8%
Swing	▼3.5pp	▲0.1pp	▲16.5pp
Premier before election
Stuart Garson
Liberal–Progressive
Premier after election
Stuart Garson
Liberal–Progressive

The 1945 Manitoba general election was held on October 15, 1945 to elect Members of the Legislative Assembly of the Province of Manitoba, Canada. The election was a landslide majority government for the incumbent coalition government led by the Liberal-Progressive Party.

The 1945 provincial election was extremely different from the previous election, which was held in 1941. In the 1941 election, the province's four legal political parties were united in a coalition government—and while coalition partners ran against one another in some constituencies, the final outcome was never in doubt.

By 1945, the coalition had been reduced to three parties. The dominant party was the Liberal-Progressive Party, whose leader was Premier Stuart Garson. The Progressive Conservative Party of Errick Willis (formerly called the Conservative Party) was the junior partner in government, while the small Social Credit League and some independents also supported the coalition.

The social-democratic Co-operative Commonwealth Federation (CCF) left the coalition in 1943, and experienced a surge in popularity over the next two years. This party was the primary opposition to the coalition government in 1945. When Tommy Douglas's CCF won a landslide election victory in 1944 in neighbouring Saskatchewan, many believed that the Manitoba party had a chance of forming government.

The communist Labour Progressive Party also ran in the election, against the coalition. The Communist Party of Canada had been banned in 1941 so sitting MLA Bill Kardash and candidates of that ilk ran under the label "Labour Progressive Party" starting in 1943.

A revived Socialist Party of Canada also fielded one candidate in Winnipeg.

The CCF experienced numerous difficulties during the campaign. Two of its incumbent members, Dwight Johnson and Beresford Richards, were accused of holding communist sympathies, and broke from the party to seek re-election as "Independent CCF" candidates. Party members were divided on the positions held by Johnson and Richards, and the CCF entered the campaign in a divided state. The party also suffered a series of unexpected technical problems: some candidates were unable to campaign because of late nomination filing, insufficient signatures on their nomination forms, and related reasons.

The result of the election was a landslide majority government for the coalition. Twenty-five Liberal-Progressives and thirteen Progressive Conservatives were elected, along with two Social Crediters and three independent coalitionists. This gave the coalition forty-three of fifty-seven seats. Most of the coalition's members were from rural constituencies.

The Cooperative Commonwealth Federation won four of ten seats in Winnipeg, but could not duplicate this success in the rest of the province. The party won only nine seats in total, up from three in the previous election. Richards, who was re-elected as an Independent CCF candidate, later rejoined the caucus as a tenth member. The CCF actually received more votes than any other party, but this meant little in practical terms: the combined coalition vote was well above the CCF total, and some coalition seats were won by acclamation.

Labour Progressive Party leader Bill Kardash also won a Winnipeg seat, as did independent leftist Lewis Stubbs.

Like previous elections, all the voters cast preferential votes. Ten MLAs were elected in city-wide Winnipeg district through Single transferable vote; all other MLAs were elected through Instant-runoff voting.

== Results ==
Manitoba general election (October 15, 1945)
Party	Leader	First-preference votes			Seats			
Party	Leader	Votes	% FPv	± (pp)	Cand.	1941	Elected	Change
**Coalition candidates**								
█ Liberal–Progressive	Stuart Garson	70,475	32.2	3.5▼	34	27	25	2▼
█ Progressive Conservative	Errick Willis	34,819	15.9	0.1▲	28	12	13	1▲
█ Independent		6,384	2.9	8.6▼	7	5	3	2▼
█ Independent Liberal-Progressive		3,248	1.5	1.5▲	3	–	–	–
█ Independent-Liberal		824	0.4	0.4▲	1	–	–	–
█ Social Credit		2,953	1.3	0.3▼	2	3	2	1▼
**Anti-Coalition candidates**								
█ Co-operative Commonwealth (Note: Exited the Coalition in 1943)	Seymour Farmer	73,988	33.8	16.5▲	39	3	9	6▲
█ Social Credit		1,548	0.7	4.9▼	2	–	–	–
█ Conservative		–	–	4.4▼	–	3	–	3▼
█ Independent		9,420	4.3	0.2▲	3	1	1	Steady
█ Labor–Progressive (Note: Formerly the Communist Party)		10,566	4.8	1.8▲	13	1	1	Steady
█ Independent-CCF		4,394	2.0	2.0▲	2	–	1	1▲
█ Socialist		222	0.1	0.1▲	1	–	–	–
█ Sound Money Economics		–	–	0.5▼	–	–	–	–
█ Liberal		–	–	0.4▼	–	–	–	–
Valid		218,841	100.0	–	135	55	55	–
Rejected (Note: For rural ridings only. No tally was taken for Winnipeg.)		1,906						
Total votes cast		220,747						
Registered voters/Turnout (Note: Excludes constituencies where candidates returned by acclamation)		397,527	55.1					

=== Results by riding ===
Bold names indicate members returned by acclamation. Italicized names indicate Anti-Coalition candidates returned. Incumbents are marked with *.

Arthur: John R. Pitt*
Assiniboia: Ernest Draffin
Beautiful Plains: John Poole* (Note: Elected in 1941 as an Anti-Coalition candidate)
Birtle: Francis Bell*
Brandon: Leslie McDorman
Carillon: **Edmond Prefontaine***
Cypress: James Christie*
Dauphin: Robert Hawkins*
Deloraine: **James O. Argue**
Dufferin: **Earl Collins*** (Note: Elected in byelection)
Emerson: John Solomon* (Note: Elected in 1941 as an Independent-Coalition candidate)
Ethelbert: Michael Sawchuk
Fairford: Stuart Garson*
Fisher: Nicholas Bachynsky*
Gilbert Plains: Stanley Fox*
Gimli: Steinn Thompson
Gladstone: **William Morton***
Glenwood: Gilbert Grant
Hamiota: Norman Turnbull*
Iberville: John McDowell (Ind PC)
Kildonan & St. Andrews: James McLenaghen*
Killarney: Abram Harrison*
Lakeside: **Douglas Campbell***
Lansdowne: Matthew Sutherland*
La Verendrye: Sauveur Marcoux*
Manitou: **Hugh Morrison***
Minnedosa: Earl Rutledge*
Morden & Rhineland: Wallace C. Miller*
Morris: John C. Dryden
Mountain: Ivan Schultz*
Norfolk: John Lawrie*
Portage la Prairie: Charles Greenlay*
Roblin: Ronald Robertson
Rockwood: W.J. Campbell
Rupertsland: Daniel Hamilton
Russell: William Wilson
St. Boniface: Edwin Hansford
St. Clements: Wilbert Doneleyko
St. George: Christian Halldorson
Ste. Rose: Maurice Dane MacCarthy*
Springfield: George Olive
Swan River: George Renouf*
The Pas: Beresford Richards* (Note: Elected in byelection as a CCF candidate) (Ind-CCF)
Turtle Mountain: **Errick Willis*** (Note: Formerly MLA for Deloraine)
Virden: Robert Mooney*
Winnipeg: John Stewart McDiarmid*
Winnipeg: William Scraba
Winnipeg: Charles Rhodes Smith*
Winnipeg: Seymour Farmer*
Winnipeg: Morris Gray*
Winnipeg: Lloyd Stinson
Winnipeg: Donovan Swailes
Winnipeg: Gunnar Thorvaldson*
Winnipeg: Lewis Stubbs*
Winnipeg: Bill Kardash*

=== Winnipeg ===
Ten MLAs elected through Single transferable vote.

Winnipeg MLAs returned by party
Party	Number
Co-operative Commonwealth	4
Liberal–Progressive	3
Independent	1
Labor–Progressive	1
Progressive Conservative	1
**Total**	10

Winnipeg (ten members)
Party	Candidate	FPv%	Count														
Party	Candidate	FPv%	1	2	3	4	5	6	7	8	9	10	11	12	13	14	15
Co-operative Commonwealth	(incumbent)**Seymour Farmer**	14.15	**11,237**														
Liberal–Progressive	(incumbent)**J.S. McDiarmid**	13.56	10,771	**10,771**													
Independent	(incumbent)**Lewis Stubbs** (Opposition)	10.46	8,309	8,309	**8,309**												
Co-operative Commonwealth	**Lloyd Stinson**	9.79	7,773	7,773	7,773	**7,773**											
Liberal–Progressive	(incumbent)**Charles Rhodes Smith**	6.18	4,909	4,946	6,059	6,174	6,181	6,313	6,889	6,973	6,995	7,010	**7,957**				
Co-operative Commonwealth	(incumbent)**Morris Gray**	5.13	4,075	5,743	5,787	5,915	6,026	6,111	6,165	6,664	**7,462**						
Labor–Progressive	(incumbent)**Bill Kardash**	5.05	4,014	4,067	4,076	4,133	4,138	4,183	4,212	4,237	6,141	6,319	6,388	6,394	6,512	6,832	**6,892**
Progressive Conservative	(incumbent)**Gunnar Thorvaldson**	4.96	3,941	3,966	4,592	4,671	4,677	4,830	5,099	5,128	5,145	5,148	5,818	6,013	6,067	6,162	**7,256**
Liberal–Progressive	**William Scraba**	4.55	3,616	3,656	3,790	3,828	3,833	3,900	4,032	4,085	4,135	4,143	4,479	4,712	4,847	4,931	**5,774**
Progressive Conservative	Mark Long	3.79	3,012	3,035	3,227	3,272	3,276	3,425	3,776	3,806	3,819	3,822	4,121	4,191	4,232	4,273	
Labor–Progressive	Joseph Zuken	3.70	2,939	2,963	2,974	3,010	3,014	3,049	3,092	3,103							
Progressive Conservative	Morley Lougheed	3.38	2,681	2,715	3,200	3,285	3,291	3,407	3,637	3,664	3,679	3,683	3,993	4,192	4,242	4,315	5,621
Co-operative Commonwealth	**Donovan Swailes**	3.35	2,663	3,682	3,709	3,876	4,087	4,210	4,243	4,902	4,924	4,941	5,065	5,089	**7,863**		
Co-operative Commonwealth	George Stapleton	2.93	2,329	2,687	2,698	2,757	2,838	2,928	2,942	3,942	3,960	3,971	4,047	4,055			
Liberal–Progressive	(incumbent)Paul Bardal	2.58	2,053	2,094	2,677	2,766	2,773	2,882	3,213	3,237	3,290	3,291					
Liberal–Progressive	M. Walsh	2.35	1,867	1,898	2,127	2,166	2,171	2,253									
Co-operative Commonwealth	A.N. Robertson	2.26	1,796	2,391	2,419	2,483	2,568	2,659	2,694								
Social Credit	T.H. Taylor	0.80	635	656	663	689	692										
Progressive Conservative	Roy Sully	0.75	592	623	665	706	716										
Socialist Party of Canada	James Milne	0.28	222	236	254	263	264										
Electorate: 155,824 Valid: 79,433 Spoilt: n/a Quota: 7,222 Turnout: 79,433 (50.98%)

Winnipeg (analysis of transferred votes, candidates ranked in order of 1st preference votes)
Party	Candidate	Maximum round	Maximum votes	Share in maximum round	Maximum votes First round votes Transfer votes
Co-operative Commonwealth	**Seymour Farmer**	1	11,237	14.15%	
Liberal-Progressive	**J.S. McDiarmid**	1	10,771	13.56%	
Independent	**Lewis Stubbs**	1	8,309	10.46%	
Co-operative Commonwealth	**Lloyd Stinson**	1	7,773	9.79%	
Liberal-Progressive	**Charles Rhodes Smith**	11	7,957	10.20%	
Co-operative Commonwealth	**Morris Gray**	9	7,462	9.51%	
Labor-Progressive	**Bill Kardash**	15	6,892	9.06%	
Progressive Conservative	**Gunnar Thorvaldson**	15	7,256	9.54%	
Liberal-Progressive	**William Scraba**	15	5,774	7.59%	
Progressive Conservative	Mark Long	14	4,273	5.54%	
Labor-Progressive	Joseph Zuken	8	3,103	3.95%	
Progressive Conservative	Morley Lougheed	15	5,621	7.39%	
Co-operative Commonwealth	**Donovan Swailes**	13	7,863	10.20%	
Co-operative Commonwealth	George Stapleton	12	4,055	5.20%	
Liberal-Progressive	Paul Bardal	10	3,291	4.20%	
Liberal-Progressive	M. Walsh	6	2,253	2.85%	
Co-operative Commonwealth	A.N. Robertson	7	2,694	3.42%	
Social Credit	T.H. Taylor	5	716	0.90%	
Progressive Conservative	Roy Sully	5	692	0.87%	
Socialist Party of Canada	James Milne	5	264	0.33%	
Exhausted votes			3,336	4.20%	

== Post-election changes ==
Beresford Richards (Ind CCF) was re-admitted to the CCF caucus in December 1945.

Special elections for members of the armed forces were held in January 1946, in light of the fact that many Manitoba citizens had served overseas in World War II and were unable to vote in the general election. Gordon Churchill was elected to represent the Canadian Army, Alex J. Stringer was elected for the Royal Canadian Navy and Ronald Turner was elected for the Royal Canadian Air Force. Stringer later became a Progressive Conservative, while Turner became a Liberal-Progressive. Churchill sat as an independent.

Minnedosa (res. Earl Rutledge, July 13, 1948), November 2, 1948:

- Henry Rungay (LP) 3470
- Frith (CCF) 1362

Fairford (res. Stuart Garson, November 13, 1948), December 23, 1948:

- James Anderson (LP) elected
- Michael Taczynski (CCF)

Beresford Richards and Wilbert Doneleyko were expelled from the CCF in July 1949, and sat as independent members.

Iberville (res. John McDowell, 1949)

Winnipeg (res. Gunnar Thorvaldson, 1949)

Gordon Churchill, Army Representative, resigns in 1949.

== See also ==
- List of Manitoba political parties
