= Joseph Donaldson =

Canadian politician

Joseph Cameron Donaldson (January 12, 1891 – April 27, 1973) was a politician in Manitoba, Canada. He was briefly a member of the Legislative Assembly of Manitoba, serving from 1949 to 1951.

The son of Joseph Donaldson and Elizabeth Wallis, he was born in Brandon, Manitoba. Donaldson worked for the Hudson's Bay Company from 1926 to 1929. He then worked for meat companies in the United States and returned to Brandon in 1936. Donaldson owned and operated Brandon Packers from 1940 until 1956, when he sold the company. The two men who purchased the company, D. Hubert Cox and Hugh Paton, were later convicted of conspiracy to defraud and conspiracy to steal in connection with the sale.

Donaldson was elected to the Manitoba legislature for the Brandon City constituency in the 1949 provincial election. He was elected as a Progressive Conservative, supporting the coalition government led by Liberal-Progressive Premier Douglas Campbell.

The Progressive Conservative Party left the coalition government in the summer of 1950. Donaldson disagreed with this decision, and chose to sit as an independent. He resigned his seat on April 18, 1951, and did not seek a return to the legislature thereafter. He nonetheless remained active in the Progressive Conservative Party, and nominated Reginald Lissaman as the party's candidate for Brandon City in the 1953 provincial election.

He died in Brandon at the age of 82.
