= Deloraine—Glenwood =

Defunct provincial electoral district in Manitoba, Canada

Deloraine—Glenwood is a former provincial electoral district in Manitoba, Canada.

The constituency was created for the 1949 provincial election, by a merger of the Deloraine and Glenwood constituencies. It was eliminated by redistribution in the 1958 election.

== Members of the Legislative Assembly ==
Name	Party	Took office	Left office
James O. Argue	Progressive Conservative (Coalition)	1949	1953
	Progressive Conservative	1953	1955
Albert Draper	Progressive Conservative	1955	1958

== See also ==
- List of Manitoba provincial electoral districts
- Canadian provincial electoral districts
