= John Hawryluk =

Canadian politician

John Martin Hawryluk (December 8, 1910 in Winnipeg, Manitoba – December 5, 1975) was a politician in Manitoba, Canada. He served in the Legislative Assembly of Manitoba from 1949 to 1962, initially for the Cooperative Commonwealth Federation and later for its successor party, the NDP.

The son of Michael Hawryluk and Maria Marcinow, Hawryluk was educated at the University of Manitoba, from which he received Bachelor of Science, Bachelor of Education and Master of Education degrees. He served as a teacher and vice principal at Prince Edward School and later as the school principal of {old}Polson School, Melrose Junior High and Munroe Junior High in East Kildonan, retiring from Munroe Junior High in 1974. He was also president of the Winnipeg Ukrainian and Professional Business Men's Club, and the Manitoba Teachers' Society. Hawryluk served in the senate and on the board of Regents for the University of Winnipeg.

He was first elected to the Manitoba legislature in the 1949 election, in the four-member riding of Winnipeg North. Hawryluk finished fourth on the first ballot, and was declared elected on the eighth count. He was re-elected in the 1953 election, this time finishing third on the first count.

Winnipeg switched to single-member constituencies for the 1958 provincial election, and Hawryluk was re-elected in the newly created constituency of Burrows. He defeated Bill Kardash, the last Communist to serve in the Manitoba legislature, by 825 votes.

Hawryluk was re-elected in the 1959 election, and was part of the CCF's transition to the New Democratic Party in 1961. He lost his seat in the 1962 election to Mark Smerchanski, a Liberal Party organizer who was also a prominent member of Winnipeg's Ukrainian community. Hawryluk was known as a supporter of education rights during his time in the legislature.

He died in Winnipeg at the age of 64.
