= Edwin Hansford =

Canadian politician (1895–1959)

15th Mayor of St. Boniface
- In office 1953–1954
- Preceded by: George Campbell MacLean
- Succeeded by: Joseph Van Belleghem

Leader of the Manitoba Co-operative Commonwealth Federation
- In office 1947–1952
- Preceded by: Seymour Farmer
- Succeeded by: William Bryce

Member of the Legislative Assembly of Manitoba for St. Boniface
- In office October 15, 1945 – June 8, 1953 Serving with Joseph Van Belleghem
- Preceded by: Austin Clarke
- Succeeded by: Roger Teillet; L. Raymond Fennell

St. Boniface Alderman
- In office 1931–1945

Personal details
- Born: December 1, 1895 Annapolis Valley, Nova Scotia
- Died: March 12, 1959 (aged 63) Winnipeg, Manitoba
- Party: Co-operative Commonwealth Federation
- Other political affiliations: Independent Labour Party
- Occupation: Railwayman

Military service
- Battles/wars: First World War

Edwin Arnold Hansford (December 1, 1895 – March 12, 1959) was a politician in Manitoba, Canada, and served as leader of that province's Co-operative Commonwealth Federation between 1948 and 1952.

Hansford was born in the Annapolis Valley region of Nova Scotia. He served overseas in World War I for four-and-a-half years, and subsequently worked for Canadian National Railways.

Hansford ran as a candidate of the Independent Labour Party in the federal riding of St. Boniface, in the 1930 federal election, but was defeated. Five years later, he was again defeated as a candidate of the CCF (successor party to the ILP in Manitoba). Hansford was more successful in municipal politics — he became a St. Boniface alderman in 1931, and served until 1945.

Hansford was also a member of the provincial CCF executive, although his first attempt to enter provincial politics was unsuccessful. The CCF had joined Premier John Bracken's coalition ministry in 1940, but was subsequently marginalized by the Liberal-Conservative alliance that dominated the government. Demoralized, the party won only three seats members in the 1941 election. Running in provincial St. Boniface riding, Hansford was defeated by almost 1000 votes.

In 1943, the CCF left the coalition and was enjoying a higher level of popular support. The party posed a credible threat to the Liberal-Conservative coalition in the 1945 election, and while the overall results were disappointing (only ten Members of the Legislative Assembly (MLAs) elected out of 57 seats), Hansford was able to carry St. Boniface by more than 2000 votes over his nearest opponent.

Seymour Farmer resigned as party leader in 1947. The CCF caucus chose Hansford to lead the CCF in the legislature and, the following year, Hansford was confirmed leader at the party's convention without opposition. Five others were nominated from the floor for the position but all declined to stand. He was the first leader of Manitoba's "parliamentary left" from outside of the City of Winnipeg proper.

The late 1940s were a period of decline for most left-wing groups within Canada, and the Manitoba CCF did not escape this pattern. The party was particularly plagued by divisions over cooperation with the province's Communists. The party leadership was universally against such cooperation, but many rank-and-file members (and some MLAs) supported it. The result was that the party was viewed with suspicion by both "centre-left" voters and more committed leftists. Hansford himself was not regarded as a strong leader, often being upstaged by MLAs Donovan Swailes and Lloyd Stinson.

Prior to the 1949 election, Hansford publicly rebuked two members of his caucus (Wilbert Doneleyko and Beresford Richards) who had condemned international negotiations for what became the North Atlantic Treaty Organization. This resulted in a backlash from the left wing of the CCF, which generally opposed the foreign policies of American President Harry Truman.

The CCF ran only 26 candidates in the election of 1949, and won seven seats. Hansford was re-elected in St. Boniface, but finished a discouraging second in what was now a two-member riding (members elected by preferential balloting). He resigned as party leader in 1952, and did not seek re-election in 1953. He subsequently returned to municipal politics, serving as mayor of St. Boniface.

Hansford died in Winnipeg in 1959.
