= Joseph Van Belleghem =

Canadian politician

Joseph Gustave Van Belleghen (September 6, 1901 in St. Vital, Manitoba – January 5, 1967) was a politician in Manitoba, Canada. He served in the Legislative Assembly of Manitoba as a Liberal-Progressive from 1949 to 1953.

The son of Belgian parents Désiré Van Belleghem and Louise Bossuyt, Van Belleghem was educated at the École Provencher and St. Boniface College. He worked as an accountant for the Canadian National Railway and then operated a hotel at St. Boniface in partnership with his brother for several years. In 1929, Van Belleghem married Clara Ysenbaert. He served as an alderman in St. Boniface for eighteen years between 1931 and 1965.

Van Belleghem was elected to the Manitoba legislature in the 1949 provincial election for the two-member constituency of St. Boniface, which elected members by a single transferable ballot. Van Belleghem finished first in this poll, with CCF leader Edwin Hansford finishing second. In 1952, he was the only member of the Liberal-Progressive caucus to support an electoral reform bill which attempted to correct the under-representation of urban members.

Van Belleghem initially planned to contest the Liberal-Progressive nomination in St. Boniface again in the 1953 election, but withdrew from the race after complaints that his campaign was not being informed of meeting times. He sought re-election as an Independent Liberal-Progressive and was defeated, He placed third on the first count, fell to fourth after transfers, then was eliminated.

He was later elected Mayor of St. Boniface, serving from 1955 to 1960. Fluent in Dutch and French, he was appointed Belgian Consul for Manitoba in 1964 and held this position until his death.

He died in St. Boniface.

An "École Van Belleghem" was opened in Winnipeg shortly after his death.
