= 1958 Manitoba general election =

- June 16, 1958

57 seats of the Legislative Assembly of Manitoba 29 seats needed for a majority
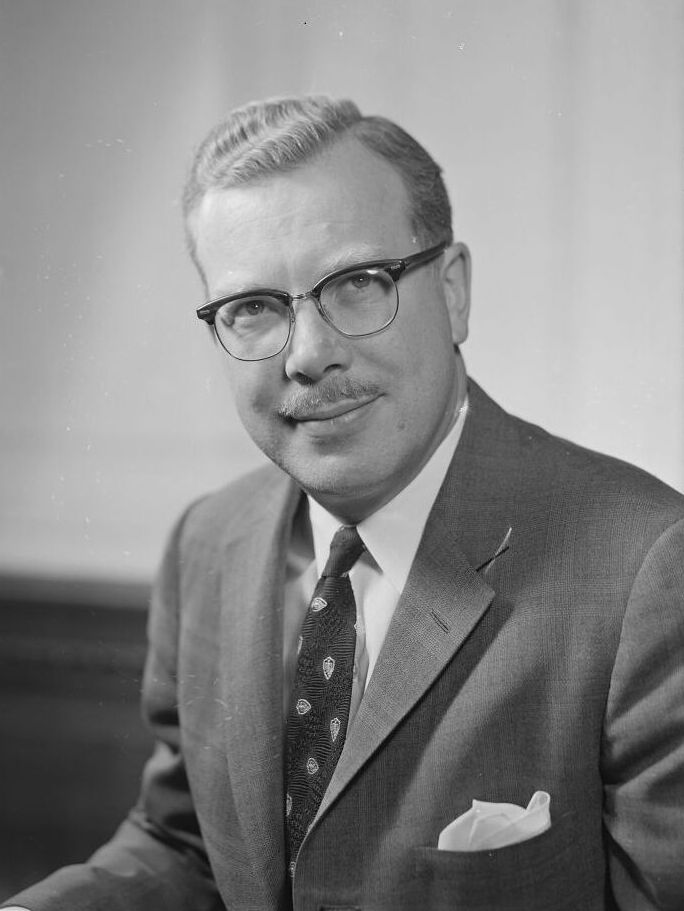
	First party	Second party	Third party
Leader	Duff Roblin	Douglas Campbell	Lloyd Stinson
Party	Progressive Conservative	Liberal–Progressive	Co-operative Commonwealth
Leader since	June 17, 1954	November 13, 1948	December 19, 1952
Leader's seat	Wolseley	Lakeside	Osborne
Last election	12	35	5
Seats won	26	19	11
Seat change	▲14	▼16	▲6
Percentage	40.6%	34.7%	20.0%
Swing	▼9.5pp	▼4.4pp	▲3.44pp
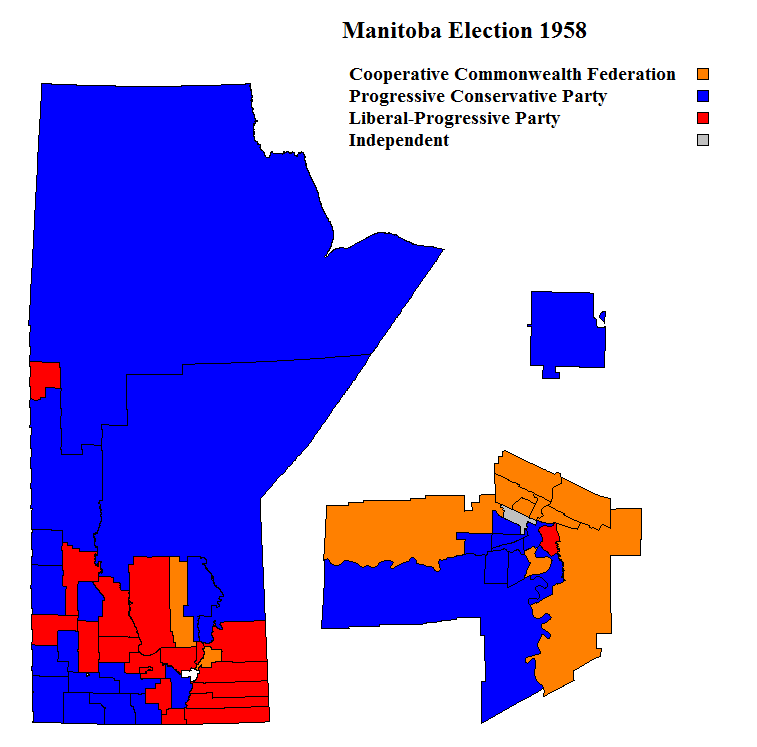
- Map of Election Results
Premier of Manitoba before election
Douglas Lloyd Campbell
Liberal–Progressive
Premier after election
Dufferin Roblin
Progressive Conservative

The 1958 Manitoba general election was held on June 16, 1958 to elect Members of the Legislative Assembly of the Province of Manitoba, Canada. The election resulted in a minority victory for the Progressive Conservative Party under the leadership of Dufferin Roblin.

This election was the first in Manitoba after a comprehensive electoral redistribution in 1956. The redistribution saw the city of Winnipeg abandon its three four-member districts. St. Boniface also was broken up into two single-member districts. The old Winnipeg, St. Boniface and two suburban districts were made into 20 single-member constituencies altogether, to give the City of Winnipeg increased representation in the legislature. Elections hereafter used FPTP.

As well the other districts in the province had dropped the Alternative Voting system and simply used the plurality first past the post system from here on.

Premier Douglas Campbell's Liberal-Progressives lost the majority they had held since 1922. The Progressive Conservative Party under the leadership of Dufferin Roblin won 26 seats, three short of a majority, while the Liberal-Progressives were reduced to second-place status with 19. The social democratic Co-operative Commonwealth Federation (CCF) held the balance of power with 11 seats, and independent Stephen Juba was also elected in Winnipeg. Both Social Credit and the Labour Progressive Party lost their legislative representation.

After the election, the Liberal-Progressives attempted to form a coalition with the CCF to remain in power. The CCF rejected this offer, instead giving confidence and supply to a PC government under Roblin and ending 36 years of Progressive and Liberal-Progressive led governments in Manitoba. Although the Progressive Conservatives had been part of a coalition government with the Liberal-Progressives from 1940 to 1950, this was the first time since 1915 that they had formed an administration on their own. This was the last time the Liberals formed government in Manitoba. This was the start of a decline for the Liberals, and a concurrent rise for the CCF.

Roblin's government proved unstable, and was defeated in the legislature in early 1959. Manitobans returned to the polls shortly thereafter, and gave the Tories an outright majority while the Liberals were cut down to only 11 seats.

== Results ==
Party	Party leader	# of candidates	Seats			Popular vote		
Party	Party leader	# of candidates	1953	Elected	Change	#	%	% Change
Progressive Conservative	Dufferin Roblin	56	12	26	+14		40.6%	-3.9%
Liberal-Progressive	Douglas Campbell	56	35	19	-16		34.7%	-9.5%
Co-operative Commonwealth	Lloyd Stinson	43	5	11	+6		20.0%	3.44%
Social Credit	none	12	2	0	-2		1.8%	-11.56%
Labor–Progressive	William Cecil Ross	1	1	0	-1			
Independent		11	2	1	-1			
Total			57	57			100%	

Popular vote
PC	40.60%
Liberal-Progressive	34.70%
CCF	20.00%
Social Credit	1.80%
Others	2.90%

Seats summary
PC	45.61%
Liberal-Progressive	33.33%
CCF	19.30%

== Riding results ==
Party key:

- PC: Progressive Conservative Party of Manitoba
- LP: Liberal-Progressive Party of Manitoba
- CCF: Manitoba Co-operative Commonwealth Federation
- SC: Manitoba Social Credit Party
- LPP: Labour Progressive Party of Manitoba
- Ind: Independent

(incumbent) denotes incumbent.

Arthur:

- John Gordon Cobb (PC) 2072
- John Wilfred McRae (LP) 2032
- Walter D. Taylor (SC) 693

1958 Manitoba general election: Assiniboia
Party	Candidate	Votes	%	±%
Co-operative Commonwealth	Donovan Swailes	2,409	41.17	4.06
Progressive Conservative	George William Johnson	2,278	38.93	23.05
Liberal–Progressive	David McKee Graham	1,165	19.91	-20.57
Total valid votes		5,852	–	–
Rejected		67	–	
Eligible voters / Turnout		11,720	50.50	-18.39
Source(s) Source: Manitoba. Chief Electoral Officer (1999). Statement of Votes for the 37th Provincial General Election, September 21, 1999 (PDF) (Report). Winnipeg: Elections Manitoba.

Birtle-Russell:

- (incumbent)Rodney Stewart Clement (LP) 2232
- Robert Gordon Smellie (PC) 2102
- Eugene Caldwell (CCF) 933

Brandon:

- (incumbent)Reginald Otto Lissaman (PC) 4442
- Robert Addison Clement (LP) 2818
- Hans Fries (CCF) 780

Brokenhead:

1958 Manitoba general election: Brokenhead
Party	Candidate	Votes	%
Co-operative Commonwealth	Edward Schreyer	1,474	37.06
Liberal–Progressive	Fred Helwer	930	23.38
Progressive Conservative	Howard Wachal	729	18.33
Independent	Stanley Copp	641	16.12
Social Credit	John William Gross	203	5.10
Total valid votes		3,977	–
Rejected		33	–
Eligible voters / Turnout		6,505	61.64
Source(s) Source: Manitoba. Chief Electoral Officer (1999). Statement of Votes for the 37th Provincial General Election, September 21, 1999 (PDF) (Report). Winnipeg: Elections Manitoba.

Burrows:

- (incumbent)John Martin Hawryluk (CCF) 2032
- (incumbent)William Arthur Kardash (LPP) 1207
- Joseph R. Hnidan (LP) 1084
- John Kereluk (PC) 1067

Carillon:

- (incumbent)Edmond Prefontaine (LP) 2433
- Liguori Gauthier (PC) 1047
- Henry Mueller (Ind) 608

Churchill:

- Edward Joseph Williams (PC) 1580
- K. Don Wray (LP) 1283
- Frank Mercer (CCF) 370

1958 Manitoba general election: Cypress
Party	Candidate	Votes	%	±%
Progressive Conservative	Marcel Boulic	2,347	52.12	
Liberal–Progressive	Samuel Burch	1,835	40.75	
Co-operative Commonwealth	G.H. McIntosh	321	7.13	
Total valid votes		4,503		
Rejected votes		19		
Turnout		4,522	68.13	
Electors on the lists		6,637		

Dauphin:

- Stewart Edgertson McLean (PC) 2740
- John Potoski (LP) 1389
- A. Clifford Matthews (CCF) 1067

Dufferin:

- (incumbent)Walter Clifton McDonald (LP) 1822
- William Homer Hamilton (PC) 1749
- Ivan Langtry (SC) 545

Elmwood:

- Steve Peters (CCF) 2375
- (incumbent)Alexander Turk (LP) 1519
- Joseph Stepnuk (PC) 1084
- Michael Baryluk (Ind C) 689

Emerson:

- (incumbent)John Peter Tanchak (LP) 2897
- Frank Caspar (PC) 1918
- Joseph Lambert (Ind) 200

Ethelbert Plains:

- (incumbent)Michael Nicholas Hryhorczuk (LP) 2308
- Peter Burtniak (CCF) 1327
- Isadore Syrnyk (PC) 835

Fisher:

- Peter Wagner (CCF) 1437
- (incumbent)Nicholas Volodymir Bachynsky (LP) 1381
- John O. Olsen (PC) 1140

Flin Flon:

- (incumbent)Francis Lawrence Jobin (LP) 1935
- Charles Hubert Witney (PC) 1563
- J. Conrad W. Kerr (CCF) 637

Fort Garry:

- Sterling Rufus Lyon (PC) 3731
- (incumbent)Leslie Raymond Fennell (LP) 2408
- Nena Woodward (CCF) 1035

Fort Rouge:

- (incumbent)Edwrd Gurney Vaux Evans (PC) 3647
- James Edward Wilson (LP) 1862
- Ernest Richard Draffin (CCF) 1143

Gimli:

- George Johnson (PC) 1988
- (incumbent)Steinn Olafur Thompson (LP) 1374
- Sigurdur Wopnford (CCF) 954

Gladstone:

- Nelson Shoemaker (LP) 2570
- Clayton Gault (PC) 1677
- Melvin Batters (CCF) 455

Hamiota:

- Barry Peill Strickland (PC) 2261
- William T. Wherrett (LP) 1859
- Arthur Nicholson (CCF) 416

Inkster:

- (incumbent)Morris Gray (CCF) 3083
- Peter Okrainec (PC) 1584
- Peter Stanley Taraska (LP) 1516

Kildonan:

- Anthony John Reid (CCF) 2776
- John Ernest Willis (PC) 2665
- George Nordland Suttie (LP) 1808

Lac Du Bonnet:

- Arthur A. Trapp (LP) 1526
- Glen A. Stewart (PC) 1350
- Harry Olensky (CCF) 569
- Lawrence P Schlamp (SC) 299

Lakeside:

- (incumbent)Douglas Campbell (LP) 2119
- John F. Bate (PC) 1582

La Verendrye:

- Stanley Carl Roberts (LP) 1565
- Stan Bisson (PC) 1395

Logan:

- (incumbent)Stephen Juba (Ind) 2234
- Art Coulter (CCF) 1669

Minnedosa:

- (incumbent)Charles Lemington Shuttleworth (LP) 2117
- Sidney Paler (PC) 1983
- (incumbent)Gilbert Alexander Hutton (SC) 634
- William A. Yuel (CCF) 443

Morris:

- (incumbent)Harold Proctor Shewman (PC) 1762
- Bruce McKenzie (LP) 1014
- August Recksiedler (SC) 370

Osborne:

- (incumbent)Lloyd Cleworth Stinson (CCF) 3215
- John Howorth (PC) 2813
- Keith N. Routley (LP) 1654

Pembina:

- (incumbent)Maurice Evans Ridley (PC) 2683
- Kenneth C Hartwell (LP) 1510

Portage la Prairie:

- (incumbent)Charles Edwin Greenlay (LP) 1978
- Robert Ernest Burke (PC) 1528
- Albert R. Barrett (CCF) 541

Radisson:

- (incumbent)Andrew Russell Paulley (CCF) 3504
- Bernard Rodolph Wolfe (LP) 2334
- Harold Huppe (PC) 2116

Rhineland:

- (incumbent)William Conrad Miller (LP) 1687
- Oscar Martel (PC) 854
- Abe Enns (SC) 758

River Heights:

- William Blakeman Scarth (PC) 3945
- William John McKeag (LP) 2884
- Andrew Moore (Ind) 803

Roblin:

- Arnold Keith Alexander (PC) 1884
- (incumbent)Raymond Mitchell (LP) 1686
- Monty A. Miller (CCF) 1031

Rock Lake:

- (incumbent)Abram William Harrison (PC) 2465
- Walter Ernest Clark (LP) 2227

Rockwood-Iberville:

- (incumbent)Robert William Bend (LP) 2450
- George Henry Wilson Huttonn (PC) 1731
- Samuel Cranston (CCF) 434

Rupertsland:

- Joseph Ernest Jeannotte (PC) 2342
- (incumbent)Francis Roy Brown (LP) 511
- Asta Oddson (Ind) 364

St. Boniface:

- (incumbent)Roger Joseph Teillet (LP) 3178
- Harry DeLeeuw (PC) 2616
- Ben Cyr (CCF) 1256

St. George:

- (incumbent)Elman Keisler Guttormson (LP) 2144
- Dan McFayden (PC) 970
- Douglas S. Stefanson (CCF) 593
- Mahlin J.G. Magunsson (Ind Con) 274

St. James:

- Douglas Moncreiff Stanes (PC) 2646
- (incumbent)Reginald Frederick Wightman (LP) 2170
- Alvin H. Mackling (CCF) 2136

St. Johns:

- David Orlikow (CCF) 2495
- Stan Carrick (PC) 1295
- Jaroslaw Rebchuk (LP) 922

St. Matthews:

- William George Martin (PC) 2848
- Gordon Richard Fines (CCF) 2026
- Anne Ethel Murphy (LP) 1854
- (incumbent)Henry Baird Scott (IC) 260
- George Albert Frith (Ind) 149

St. Vital:

- Frederick Groves (PC) 3616
- William R. Appleby (LP) 2331
- Leslie C. Foden (CCF) 1334
- Percy B. Hayward (Ind) 242

Ste. Rose:

- (incumbent)Gildas Laurent Molgat (LP) 2400
- Alvin Getz (PC) 1010
- Alphonse J. Bouchard (SC) 415
- Leon W. Hoefer (CCF) 354

Selkirk:

- (incumbent)Thomas Paterson Hillhouse (LP) 1850
- David B. Veitch (PC) 1493
- Frank Kuzemski (CCF) 591
- Fred L. Luining (SC) 173

Seven Oaks:

- Arthur Edgar Wright (CCF) 3641
- Maurice Gutnik (PC) 1541
- Cecil Joseph Henry Lyon (LP) 1449

Souris-Lansdowne:

- Malcolm Earl McKellar (PC) 2256
- David Lloyd Barclay (LP) 1549
- Alex Shiloff (CCF) 95

Springfield:

- (incumbent)William Lucko (LP) 1351
- Oscar Russell (PC) 1269
- Ed Kanarowski (CCF) 875
- William G. Storsley (SC) 283

Swan River:

- Albert Harold C. Corbett (PC) 1421
- Hilliard Farriss (CCF) 1316
- (incumbent)Ronald Douglas Robertson (LP) 1083
- Aldric S. Helps (SC) 285

The Pas:

- John Benson Carroll (PC) 2325
- William E. Cudmore (LP) 898
- Howard Russell Pawley (CCF) 801

Turtle Mountain:

- (incumbent)Errick French Willis (PC) 2949
- Edward Ingo Dow (LP) 1880
- Clarence A. Ferguson (SC) 316

Virden:

- (incumbent)John William McLeod Thompson (PC) 2935
- (incumbent)Francis Campbell Bell (LP) 1662

Wellington:

- Richard Harry Seaborn (PC) 2532
- James R. McIsaac (CCF) 2385
- (incumbent)Jack St. John (LP) 1958

Winnipeg Centre:

- James Cowan (PC) 3462
- Paul W. Goodman (LP) 1623
- David Adrian Mulligan (CCF) 1141

Wolseley:

- (incumbent)Dufferin Roblin (PC) 3959
- John Gurzon Harvey (LP) 1739
- Allen Denton (CCF) 1202

== See also ==
- List of Manitoba political parties
