= Reginald Lissaman =

Canadian politician

Member of the Legislative Assembly of Manitoba for Brandon City
- In office January 21, 1952 – June 25, 1969
- Preceded by: Joseph Donaldson
- Succeeded by: Riding abolished, redistributed into Brandon East and Brandon West

Personal details
- Born: April 24, 1908; Brandon, Manitoba
- Died: August 14, 1974
- Political party: Progressive Conservative

Reginald Otto Lissaman (April 24, 1908 in Brandon, Manitoba – August 14, 1974) was a politician in Manitoba, Canada. He was a member of the Legislative Assembly of Manitoba from 1952 to 1969, sitting as a member of the Progressive Conservative Party.

The son of Frank C. Lissaman, Lissaman was educated in Brandon and Chicago, Illinois. He worked as a building contractor, was a director on the Manitoba Hydro Board and sat on the Board of Directors for Brandon College.

He was first elected to the Manitoba legislature in a 1952 by-election, scoring a fairly easy victory in the riding of Brandon City. In the 1953 general election, he was re-elected over Liberal-Progressive James Creighton by 451 votes. The Liberal-Progressives were in government during this period, and Lissaman sat as a member of the opposition. In 1953-54, he campaigned for the removal of Errick Willis as Progressive Conservative leader.

The PCs won the 1958 election, and Lissaman was handily re-elected in the renamed Brandon riding. He won further easy victories in the elections of 1959 and 1962. In the 1966 election, he was only narrowly re-elected over Liberal Terry Penton.

Lissaman, to the surprise of many, was never appointed to cabinet. He did not seek re-election in 1969.

He helped develop the International Peace Garden located on the border between North Dakota and Manitoba.
