= Bill Kardash =

Canadian communist politician (1912–1997)

Member of the Legislative Assembly of Manitoba
- In office April 22, 1941 – June 16, 1958
- Succeeded by: John Hawryluk

Leader of the Labor-Progressive Party of Manitoba
- In office 1943 – December 12, 1948
- Preceded by: office established
- Succeeded by: William Cecil Ross

Personal details
- Born: June 10, 1912 Hafford, Canada
- Died: January 17, 1997 (aged 84) Winnipeg, Canada
- Party: Communist Party of Canada
- Other political affiliations: Labor-Progressive Party of Canada
- Spouse: Mary Kardash
- Parent(s): Danylo Kardash; Ulyta Byck
- Military Service
- Allegiance: Spanish Republic
- Branch: Spanish Republican Army
- Units: 35th Division; XV International Brigade; Mackenzie–Papineau Battalion
- Conflicts: Spanish Civil War (WIA)

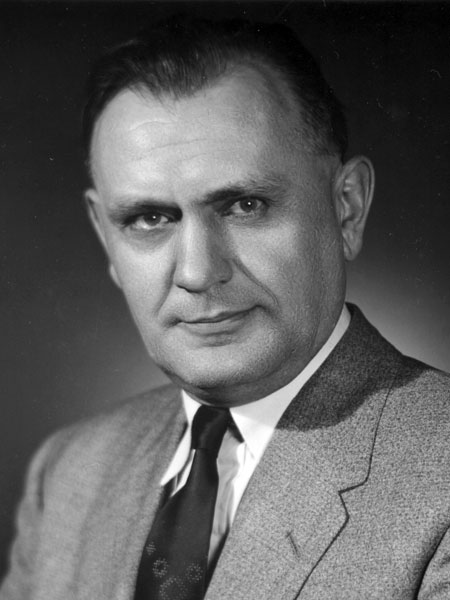
William Arthur Kardash, Canadian politician, General Secretary of the Communist Party (Manitoba) from 1943 to 1948 and Member of the Legislative Assembly of Manitoba from 1941 to 1958.

William Arthur Kardash (June 10, 1912 – January 17, 1997) was a politician and member of the Legislative Assembly of Manitoba from 1941 until 1958. He served as Winnipeg MLA from 1941 to 1958, as Worker's Candidate at first, then as a representative of the Labor-Progressive Party. He was among the handful of Communists elected in Winnipeg between 1927 and 1983.

The youngest child of Ukrainian Canadian parents Danylo Kardash and Ulyta Byck, he was born in Hafford, Saskatchewan, north of Saskatoon, and educated at Hafford High School.

Kardash was a veteran of the Spanish Civil War, having fought with the Mackenzie–Papineau Battalion, in which he lost a leg. He was a member of the Communist Party of Canada and, after 1943, the Labor-Progressive Party, which was the legal front of the Communist Party after it was banned. Kardash became the first leader of the Manitoba LPP in 1943, retaining the position until 1948 when he resigned for health reasons. He was also the first national chairman of the LPP.

In 1940, Kardash married Mary Kostaniuk, with whom he had two children, Ted and Nancy.

In 1941, he was elected to the provincial legislature in the ten-member district of Winnipeg. He was re-elected in 1945. In 1949 and 1953, he was reelected in the new four-member district of Winnipeg North.

The LPP's popularity declined after 1945. Kardash was the only candidate to run for the LPP in the Manitoba elections of 1953 and 1958.

Kardash was defeated in the 1958 general election. His defeat was due in part to the pressures of the Cold War, as well as the abolition of proportional representation and multi-member districts. This caused him to contest a single-member election held under first-past-the-post voting: he contested Burrows and came second to Co-operative Commonwealth Federation candidate John Hawryluk (socialism as practised by the CCF and its successor, the New Democratic Party, was popularly considered more moderate). After his defeat, the LPP would never again elect a candidate to the legislature.

In 1948, Kardash became general manager of the People's Co-operative Dairy, Fuel and Lumber Yards in 1948, retiring in 1982. He served as president of the board of directors for the co-operative until the business was sold to its employees in 1993.

Kardash ran in the new Point Douglas constituency in 1969 for the (renamed) Communist Party of Manitoba, but received only 421 votes (9.81%), coming in last in a four-candidate race won by Donald Malinowski of the NDP.

Kardash remained active in Winnipeg's Ukrainian community for the rest of his life.

Bill's wife, Mary, was also a longtime communist activist and school trustee in Winnipeg.

In 1995, he attended a public dedication ceremony at the Ontario legislature held to honour veterans of the Mackenzie–Papineau Battalion, of which he was one.

After Kardash's death in 1997, the Manitoba legislature held a moment of silence in his honour.
