= Dufferin Roblin =

Premier of Manitoba from 1958 to 1967

The Honourable Dufferin Roblin PC CC OM
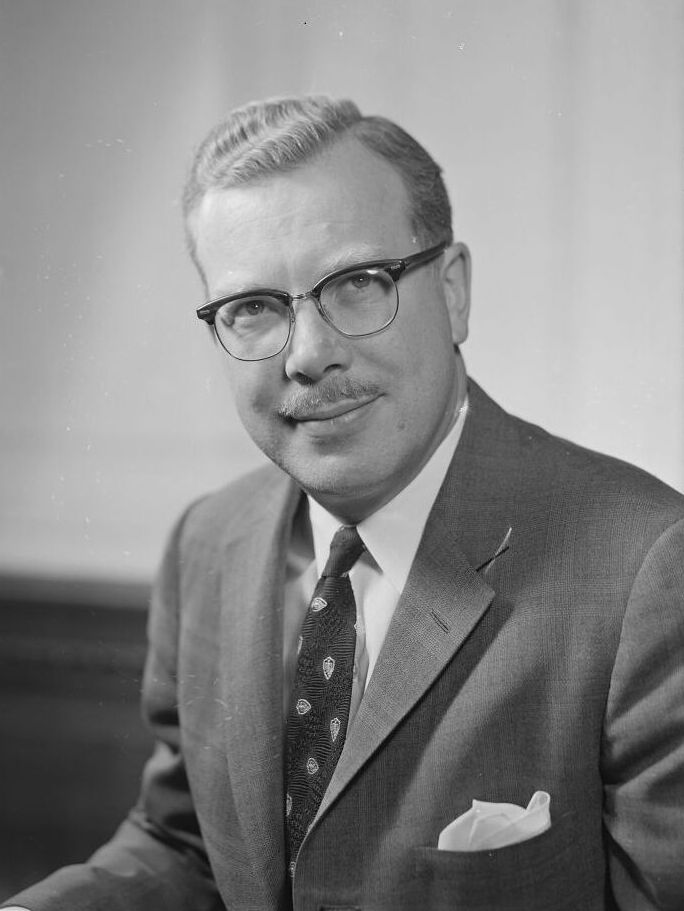
- Roblin, c. 1959

14th Premier of Manitoba
- In office June 30, 1958 – November 27, 1967
- Monarch: Elizabeth II
- Lieutenant Governor: John S. McDiarmid; Errick Willis; Richard S. Bowles
- Preceded by: Douglas Lloyd Campbell
- Succeeded by: Walter Weir

Canadian Senator from Manitoba
- In office March 23, 1978 – June 17, 1992
- Appointed by: Pierre Trudeau

Member of the Legislative Assembly of Manitoba for Wolseley
- In office June 16, 1958 – May 1, 1968
- Preceded by: district created
- Succeeded by: Leonard Claydon

Member of the Legislative Assembly of Manitoba for Winnipeg South
- In office November 10, 1949 – June 16, 1958 Serving with John S. McDiarmid, Ronald Turner, Lloyd Stinson, Gurney Evans
- Preceded by: district created
- Succeeded by: district abolished

Personal details
- Born: Charles Dufferin Roblin Jr. June 17, 1917 Winnipeg, Manitoba, Canada
- Died: May 30, 2010 (aged 92) Winnipeg, Manitoba, Canada
- Party: Progressive Conservative Party of Manitoba
- Other political affiliations: Progressive Conservative
- Spouse: Mary MacKay (m. 1958)
- Relations: Jennifer Roblin, Lily Roblin, Rachel Roblin

Charles Dufferin "Duff" Roblin Jr. PC CC OM (June 17, 1917 – May 30, 2010) was a Canadian businessman and politician. He served as the 14th premier of Manitoba from 1958 to 1967. Roblin was appointed to the Senate of Canada on the advice of Prime Minister Pierre Trudeau. In the government of Brian Mulroney, he served as government leader in the Senate. He was the grandson of Sir Rodmond Roblin, who also served as Manitoba premier. His ancestor John Roblin served in the Upper Canada assembly.

== Early life ==
Roblin was born in Winnipeg, Manitoba, to Charles Dufferin Roblin and Sophie Murdoch, and was educated at the University of Manitoba and the University of Chicago. He was a car dealer before entering politics, and served as a Wing Commander in the Royal Canadian Air Force from 1940 to 1946.

Like his grandfather, Roblin was a member of Manitoba's Conservative Party, which was renamed the Progressive Conservative Party in 1942. During the 1940s, the Manitoba Conservatives were part of a coalition government with the Liberal-Progressives, and Conservative leader Errick Willis was a prominent cabinet minister in the governments of John Bracken, Stuart Garson and Douglas Campbell.

== Political career ==
=== Provincial backbencher ===
There were opponents of the coalition in both the Liberal and Conservative ranks. Roblin was a part of the latter group and was elected to the Legislative Assembly of Manitoba in 1949 as an "Independent Progressive Conservative" opposing the coalition. Running in the multi-member riding of Winnipeg South, he finished well ahead of the official Progressive Conservative candidate and soon emerged as the leading voice for anti-coalition Tories in the province.

Willis resigned as a cabinet minister in August 1950, and the Progressive Conservative delegates overwhelmingly voted to leave the coalition at their annual convention that year. Some party members tried to convince Roblin to stand against Willis for the leadership, but Roblin declined.

Roblin was re-elected for Winnipeg South in 1953, but the Progressive Conservative Party, as a whole, fared poorly by winning only 12 seats out of 57. Willis was blamed for the party's loss, and another effort was made to draft Roblin as leader.

=== Leadership win ===
When Willis called a leadership convention for 1954, Roblin quickly declared himself a candidate. He built up a strong organization throughout the province and was able to defeat Willis on the second ballot. Roblin's support came mostly from rural delegates. The Progressive Conservatives' grassroots network had atrophied during the coalition years, and for the next four years, Roblin was involved in the arduous task of rebuilding the party organization.

Ideologically, Roblin was a Red Tory. He opposed the cautionary small government ideology of Liberal-Progressive Premier Douglas Campbell. Indeed, Roblin was well to the left of Campbell at the time. He pledged to expand government services if elected.

=== Premier ===
Under Roblin's leadership, the Tories became the largest party in the legislature at the 1958 provincial election, winning 26 seats. Roblin himself was elected for the new single-member constituency of Wolseley, located in the centre of Winnipeg. The Manitoba CCF agreed to tolerate a Tory minority government, and Roblin became premier—ending 35 years of Progressive/Liberal-Progressive government in the province.

His government quickly enacted a series of progressive reforms, which were supported by the CCF. Roblin was thereby able to build up a successful legislative record and won the support of many centre-left voters who were previously uncommitted. His government lost a parliamentary vote of confidence in 1959, but was re-elected with a decisive majority in the ensuing election later in the year, taking 36 out of 57 seats.

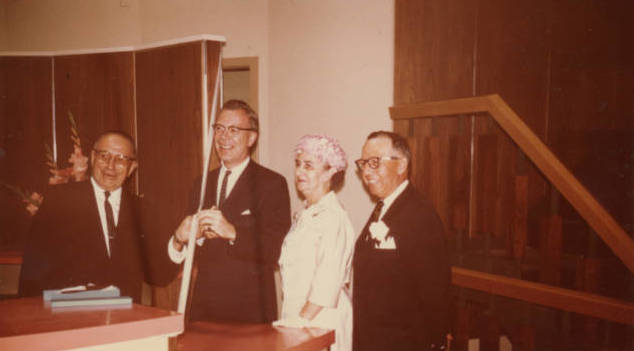
Roblin (centre left) cutting the ribbon at the 1963 opening of the St. Vital Library

Roblin's government upgraded highways, created parks, and built the Red River Floodway around Winnipeg, popularly known as "Duff's Ditch." It reintroduced French instruction in schools, modernized hospitals, expanded social spending, and strengthened social welfare programs. It also improved postsecondary education and promoted urban development by consolidating the various municipalities in the Winnipeg area into a single metropolitan entity. For primary education, Roblin's ministry brought Manitoba's system of one-room schoolhouses into the modern era by building consolidated schools.

The Progressive Conservatives were re-elected with landslide mandates in the 1962 and 1966 elections, and Roblin never faced any serious competition in his own riding.

=== Federal politics ===
Roblin resigned in 1967 to run for the leadership of the federal Progressive Conservative Party at its 1967 leadership convention. He ran a strong campaign but came second to Nova Scotia Premier Robert Stanfield.

Roblin was a candidate in Winnipeg South Centre for the 1968 federal election but lost to Liberal E.B. Osler by over 10,000 votes. Roblin was hurt by an unpopular provincial sales tax introduced by his government as well as the more general "Trudeaumania" phenomenon. After the election, he was named as vice-president of Canadian Pacific Investments. In 1970, he was made a Companion of the Order of Canada.

In the 1974 federal election, Roblin ran for the House of Commons in the Ontario riding of Peterborough. He was soundly defeated by Liberal Hugh Faulkner and later referred to the entire campaign as a lapse in judgement.

In 1978, Roblin was appointed to the Senate by Prime Minister Pierre Trudeau, officially representing the Manitoba region of Red River. He was the deputy leader of the government in the Senate during Joe Clark's brief tenure as prime minister (1979–1980) and served as Deputy Opposition Leader from 1980 to 1984.

After Brian Mulroney's landslide victory in the 1984 election, Roblin was appointed Leader of the Government in the Senate, and served in Mulroney's cabinet until June 29, 1986. In that capacity, he was particularly interested in matters relating to African economic development.

Roblin retired from the Senate on June 17, 1992, having reached the mandatory retirement age of 75. He received the President's Award of the Winnipeg Press Club in 1999, and published his memoirs (entitled Speaking for Myself) in the same year.

Roblin, a veteran of World War II who fought in the Normandy Campaign, represented Manitoba at the 60th Anniversary of D-Day in France. He, along with Prince Charles and the prime ministers of Canada and France, commemorated the Canadian Servicemen who were lost that day in 1944.

At the time of his death, he was the oldest living former provincial premier. Roblin died at the age of 92 on the afternoon of May 30, 2010 at the Victoria General Hospital. Upon his death, former provincial NDP leader Ed Schreyer said that "Duff Roblin led a Conservative administration the likes we’ve not seen elsewhere in Canada and not likely to see again. It was positive in every respect. He brought Manitoba into the modern era, with desired changes in education, hospital finance, roads, social assistance and flood protection."

== Electoral history ==
1968 Canadian federal election: Winnipeg South Centre
Party	Candidate	Votes	%	±%
Liberal	E. B. Osler	23,775	51.8	+15.5
Progressive Conservative	Duff Roblin	13,268	28.9	−12.9
New Democratic	Frances Thompson	8,240	17.9	−1.8
Independent Conservative	John McDowell	632	1.4	
Total valid votes		45,915	100.0	

24th Canadian Ministry (1984–1993) – Cabinet of Brian Mulroney
Cabinet post (1)
Predecessor	Office	Successor
Allan MacEachen	Leader of the Government in the Senate; 1984–1986	Lowell Murray
