= Communist Party of Canada – Manitoba =

Provincial political party in Canada

- Active provincial party
- Leader: Cam Scott
- Founded: 1921
- Headquarters: 1141 Sherburn Street; Winnipeg, Manitoba; R3E 2N3
- Ideology: Communism; Marxism–Leninism
- Political position: Far-left
- National affiliation: Communist Party of Canada
- Colours: Red

Website
- communist-party.ca/manitoba/

The Communist Party of Canada – Manitoba is the provincial wing of the Communist Party of Canada for the province of Manitoba. Founded in 1921, it was an illegal organization for several years and its meetings were conducted with great secrecy. Until 1924, the "Workers Party" functioned as its public, legal face. For a period in the 1920s, the party was associated with the Canadian Labour Party. After 1920 it attracted former members of radical and syndicalist groups such as the Industrial Workers of the World (IWW). Many of the new members were Jews, Finns or Ukrainians who supported the Russian Revolution.

Despite being a minor party since the 1960s, the party managed to field at least one candidate in all elections in Manitoba since World War II, except in 1995.

== History ==
The Workers Party ran three candidates in Winnipeg for Manitoba's 1922 provincial election: Mathew Popovitch, Arthur Henderson and William Hammond. These candidates frequently disrupted rallies for George Armstrong, a Socialist Party incumbent. None were elected.

In the 1927 election, Jacob Penner ran as a Communist candidate in Winnipeg, which at the time elected ten members by preferential balloting. Penner's 2015 first-preference votes were enough for an initial eighth-place finish, but he received few votes from transfers and was not elected.

In the 1932 election, Penner and Leslie Morris ran in Winnipeg as "United Front Workers" candidates. (The CPC had been, for all practical purposes, made illegal again in 1931). Morris finished eighth on first preferences but was unable to be elected on transfers; Penner was further behind. Communist candidates also ran in Gimli and Fisher. In the latter riding, W.N. Kolisnyk placed second against Progressive candidate Nicholas Bachynski. In 1934 it tried to organize strikes, notably copper miners at Flin Flon.

The Communist Party (once again legal) ran only one candidate in the provincial election of 1936: James Litterick in Winnipeg. In a period of increased support for the party, Litterick placed second on first-preference votes and received enough transfers from first-place candidate Lewis Stubbs to gain an easy victory. He was expelled from the legislature in 1940, after the Communist Party was once again made illegal. He subsequently went into hiding.

In the 1941 election, William Kardash (running as a Workers Party candidate) was elected for Winnipeg after placing fourth on first-preferences. Kardash was re-elected in the 1945, 1949 and 1953 elections as a member of the "Labor-Progressive Party" (as the Communists had renamed themselves).

Kardash led the provincial LPP from its founding in 1943 until December 1948, when he was replaced by William Cecil Ross. Ross served as leader until his retirement in 1981, and ran for provincial and federal office several times.

The party's support base declined during the Cold War, and Kardash was the party's only official candidate in the 1953 and 1958 elections. He was defeated on the latter occasion, after Manitoba adopted a system of single-member constituencies for Winnipeg.

The national LPP renamed itself the Communist Party in 1959, and the provincial party did the same. It now operates under the name "Communist Party of Canada – Manitoba".

The CPC-M has not elected an MLA since Kardash, and became a marginal political force during the 1960s.

Joseph Zuken (1912–1986) was a Communist city councillor and school trustee in Winnipeg. His biographer says he "was loved and hated in about equal measure. He was ignored by no one." He was the son of Jewish immigrants from Ukraine. He ran for mayor in 1979.

Paula Fletcher became the party's leader after Ross's retirement in 1981, and led the party into the 1981 and 1986 elections. The party ran only two candidates on the former occasion (Fletcher and Ross), and three on the latter.

Fletcher left Manitoba for Ontario in 1986, and subsequently left the Communist Party entirely. The CPC-M was led by Lorne Robson in the provincial election of 1988, in which it ran six candidates.

Robson also moved to Ontario in the late 1980s. Frank Goldspink subsequently served as the party's provincial organizer, and may have been its political leader as well. Goldspink was the party's sole candidate in the 1990 election, running as an independent as the party had been de-registered.

Goldspink left the Communist Party in 1991, and the CPC-M does not appear to have had a regular leader for the next five years (although its provincial organization continued to meet on an occasional basis). The party did not run any candidates in the 1995 provincial election.

Darrell Rankin moved from Ontario to Manitoba in 1995, and became the provincial organizer of the CPC-M before the year was over. Rankin was chosen as the party's official leader in 1996. Rankin led the CPC-M into the 1999 and 2003 elections, in which it ran six and five candidates respectively. The CPC-M was re-registered with Elections Manitoba in 1998, after a petition was presented with 3500 signatures.

Rankin faced a leadership challenge from Paul Sidon in January 2004, receiving 79% delegate support against 21% for Sidon. Rankin left the party in 2019. Organizer Andrew Taylor, a former anti-apartheid activist, trade unionist and professor, ran for the Communist Party in Winnipeg North during the 2019 federal election.

Throughout 2020, the CPC-M was vocal in criticizing Premier Brian Pallister's response to the COVID-19 pandemic. According to a statement from the CPC-M, "free market ideologues have escalated a foreseeable second wave in pursuit of profit, creating the perfect conditions for a public health disaster."

== Election results ==
Manitoba General Elections
Election	# of candidates nominated	# of seats won	# of total votes	% of popular vote
1932^{1}	4	0	n.a.	n.a.
1936	26	1	n.a.	2.3%
1941^{2}	n/a	n/a	n/a	n/a
1945^{3}	13	1	10,566	4.8%
1949^{3}	n.a.	1	n.a.	n.a.
1953^{3}	1	1	3,812	1.4%
1958^{3}	1	0	n.a.	n.a.
1959	3	0	1.731	0.6%
1962	2	0	816	0.3%
1966	2	0	638	0.2%
1969	2	0	744	0.2%
1973	3	0	252	0.1%
1977	4	0	299	0.1%
1981	2	0	261	0.1%
1986	5	0	356	0.1%
1988	5	0	261	0.1%
1990^{4}	1	0	25	0.0%
1995	n/a	n/a	n/a	n/a
1999	6	0	449	0.1%
2003	5	0	334	0.1%
2007	6	0	367	0.1%
2011	4	0	179	0.0%
2016	6	0	305	0.1%
2019	5	0	189	0.0%
2023	5	0	473	0.1%

Notes:

^{1}: The party was banned under Section 98, and fielded its candidates under the 'United Front' banner.

^{2}: In 1941 the party was banned under the Defence of Canada Regulations.

^{3}: Between 1945 and 1958 the party fielded candidates as the Labor-Progressive Party.

^{4}: The sole candidate of the CPC (M) ran as an independent.

== Party leaders ==
1. Bill Kardash 1943 – 12 December 1948
2. William Ross 12 December 1948 – 1981
3. Paula Fletcher 1981–1986
4. Lorne Robson (election of 1988)
5. Frank Goldspink (election of 1990) (*)
6. Darrell Rankin 1996–2019
7. Frank Komarniski 2019–2022
8. Andrew Taylor 2022–2025
9. Cam Scott 2025-Present

(*) Provincial organizer, may not have been an official party leader.
