= Lloyd Stinson =

Canadian politician (1904–1976)

The Reverend Lloyd Stinson

Winnipeg City Councillor for Ward 2
- In office 1963–1971

Winnipeg City Councillor for Ward 1
- In office 1943–1944

Leader of the Manitoba Co-operative Commonwealth Federation
- In office 1952–1960
- Preceded by: William Bryce
- Succeeded by: Russell Paulley

Member of the Legislative Assembly of Manitoba
- In office 1958–1959
- Preceded by: new constituency
- Succeeded by: Obie Baizley
- Constituency: Osborne
- In office 1949–1958 Serving with John Stewart McDiarmid, Dufferin Roblin, Ronald Turner, and Gurney Evans
- Constituency: Winnipeg South
- In office October 15, 1945 – 1949
- Constituency: Winnipeg

Provincial Secretary of the Manitoba Co-operative Commonwealth Federation
- In office 1943–1944

Personal details
- Born: February 29, 1904 Treherne, Manitoba
- Died: August 28, 1976 (aged 72) Vancouver, British Columbia
- Party: Co-operative Commonwealth Federation; New Democratic Party
- Education: United College
- Profession: Ordained minister

Lloyd Cleworth Stinson (February 29, 1904 – August 28, 1976) was a politician in Manitoba, Canada, and the leader of that province's Co-operative Commonwealth Federation (CCF) from 1953 to 1959. Although widely regarded as a capable leader, he was unable to achieve a major electoral breakthrough for his party.

Stinson was born in Treherne, Manitoba, and received education there and in Winnipeg. He graduated from Theology United College in 1933, and was ordained as a United Church minister. He received his B.D. in 1935, and took post-graduate courses in history and political science in 1940 and 1941.

Stinson stepped down as an active minister in 1942, and become Provincial Secretary for the provincial CCF the following year. He edited the "Manitoba Commonwealth" newspaper from 1943 to 1946, and served as a Winnipeg alderman from 1943 to 1944.

Unusually for a social democrat, Stinson's base was in the southern part of Winnipeg (after the General Strike of 1919, the north end generally elected socialist and labour candidates while the south supported pro-business figures). Stinson was defeated in Winnipeg South Centre in the federal election of 1945, though coming a respectable second to the victorious Liberal candidate. Later in the year, he was elected to the Legislative Assembly of Manitoba as one of ten members for the city of Winnipeg. (Winnipeg elections were determined by prefential balloting, with the entire city as one constituency). Stinson placed second among the CCF candidates, trailing only party leader Seymour Farmer.

The electoral map was redrawn in 1949, with Winnipeg divided into three ridings (each of which elected four members). Stinson was the only CCF candidate elected in Winnipeg South that year; he came very close to outpolling longtime Liberal-Progressive cabinet minister John Stewart McDiarmid for first position on the first count. The larger election picture was disappointing for the CCF, with the party winning only seven of 57 seats.

Stinson became one of the leading CCF figures in the legislative, often outshining party leader Edwin Hansford. Hansford resigned as CCF house leader in 1952, and Stinson was chosen to replace him on December 19, 1952. He was acclaimed as the official party leader on April 25, 1953, by the CCF council, and was subsequently confirmed without opposition by a provincial convention.

Stinson was a capable politician, and had the ability to reach out to centre-left voters previously alienated from the CCF. He was also a skilled networker, soliciting support from Saskatchewan Premier Tommy Douglas in designing his election platform.

He could not, however, bring the CCF above third-party status in the election of 1953. The Liberal-Conservative coalition which governed the province from 1940 to 1950 had dissolved, and most of the electorate was polarized between these two parties. The Liberal-Progressives (or Liberals) won 32 seats and a majority; the CCF were reduced to only five. Stinson fell to third place on Winnipeg South's first count, and had to wait for a later count to be re-elected.

The Liberal-Progressive government of Douglas Campbell grew unpopular between 1953 and 1958, and the CCF made some gains at Campbell's expense. They climbed to eleven seats in the 1958 election, and Stinson was elected in the new Winnipeg riding of Osborne. (Winnipeg's multi-member constituencies were replaced by single-seat ridings for this election; Osborne is located in the city's centre.)

The 1958 election resulted in a hung parliament, with the Progressive Conservatives winning 26 seats and the Liberal-Progressives 19. Campbell initially tried to form an alliance with the CCF (Stinson would have served as Minister of Welfare), but these plans came to nothing. The CCF allowed the Tories under Dufferin Roblin to form government.

Roblin's government placed the CCF in a paradoxical situation. His Progressive Conservative party was actually to the left of Campbell's Liberals, and introduced many significant reforms. The CCF had little choice but to support Roblin's legislation, thereby giving the Tories the record they needed to win another election the following year. The CCF fell to ten seats in the 1959 election, and Stinson was personally defeated by Tory candidate Obie Baizley. He resigned as party leader in 1960, and was replaced by Russell Paulley.

During Stinson's time as party leader, the CCF was unable to make significant inroads beyond its urban support base (though future Premier Ed Schreyer was elected in a rural constituency). The party made limited gains in the late 1950s, however, and was poised to become the official opposition (if Liberal support continued to decline).

In the late 1950s, Stinson supported the call to transform the national CCF into a broader party. He campaigned for its merger with the Canadian Labour Congress to create the New Democratic Party.

In 1962, Stinson ran as an NDP candidate in Wellington (north-west Winnipeg), but lost to Tory Richard Seaborn by about 200 votes. In 1963, he ran for the federal NDP in Winnipeg South and fared poorly (receiving only 7,867 votes of about 56,000 cast).

Later in 1963, Stinson was re-elected to the second ward of the Winnipeg City Council. He retained his seat in the 1967 municipal election, where he remained until his retirement in 1971. In 1969, he was chosen as chair of Winnipeg's traffic commission.

In 1975, he published a book entitled Political Warriors: Recollections of a Social-Democrat.
