= Liberal-Progressive Party candidates in the 1953 Manitoba provincial election =

The Manitoba Liberal-Progressive Party ran fifty candidates in the 1953 provincial election. Thirty-two of these candidates were elected, giving the party a majority government in the legislature. Many Liberal-Progressive candidates have their own biography pages; information on others may be found here.

The 1953 Manitoba election was determined by instant-runoff voting in most constituencies. Three constituencies (Winnipeg Centre, Winnipeg North and Winnipeg South) returned four members by the single transferable vote (STV), with a 20% quota for election. St. Boniface elected two members by STV, with a 33% quota. The Liberal-Progressives ran two candidates in St. Boniface and Winnipeg South, and three in Winnipeg Centre and Winnipeg North.

In addition to its fifty official candidates, the Liberal-Progressive Party also endorsed two candidates who ran as Independent Liberal-Progressives: Robert Bend in Rockwood and Rodney S. Clement in Russell. The only constituency where the party did not endorse a candidate was Swan River.

== John R. Pitt (Arthur) ==
Pitt had served in the legislature since 1935. Unusually for an incumbent, Pitt faced three challengers for the Liberal-Progressive nomination in 1953, defeating K. Williams of Melita, F.C. Ramsey of Waskada, and C.S. Murray of Lyleton. In the general election, Pitt lost to J. Arthur Ross of the Progressive Conservative Party in a straight two-way contest, receiving 1,440 votes (42.86%).

== Reginald Wightman (Assiniboia) ==
Wightman finished first on the first count with 3,359 votes (38.87%), and was declared elected on the final count with 4,196 votes (48.55%).

== Francis Bell (Birtle) ==
Bell was elected in a two-candidate contest with 2,148 votes (69.18%).

== James A. Creighton (Brandon City) ==
Creighton was a prominent municipal politician, and a former professional ice hockey player. He finished second on the first count with 3,063 votes (40.13%), and formally lost to Progressive Conservative candidate Reginald Lissaman on the second count.

== Edmond Prefontaine (Carillon) ==
Prefontaine was elected in a two-candidate contest with 3,278 votes (75.48%).

== Francis Ferg (Cypress) ==
Ferg finished in first place on the first count with 1,785 votes (45.39%), and was declared elected on the second count.

== John Potoski (Dauphin) ==
Potoski became Reeve of the Rural Municipality of Dauphin in 1945, and continued to hold this position in 1953. He won the nomination over William (Bill) Miller, a farmer from Spruce River. He finished second on the first count with 1,494 votes (28.83%), and lost on transfers to William Bullmore of the Social Credit Party. Bullmore had been the Mayor of Dauphin until the previous year.

Potoski ran again in the 1958 provincial election, and finished second against Progressive Conservative candidate Stewart McLean.

== Robert E. Moffat (Deloraine—Glenwood) ==
Moffat was born in Elgin, Manitoba, and later moved to Winnipeg. He was an economist and lawyer, and had previously served as chief advisor on economic affairs for the Douglas Campbell government. Moffat also been clerk of the Privy Council for Manitoba, but left the civil service when his legal career began.

He was acclaimed for the Liberal-Progressive nomination in Deloraine—Glenwood after Russell Barrett, the only other candidate, withdrew from the contest. In the general election, he lost to Progressive Conservative incumbent James O. Argue in a straight two-candidate contest, receiving 1,594 votes (46.12%).

Argue died in 1955, and a by-election was called in Deloraine—Glenwood for June 27 of that year. Moffat was again the Liberal-Progressive candidate, and lost to Progressive Conservative newcomer Albert Draper.

He contested the Winnipeg constituency of Osborne for the 1962 provincial election as a Liberal, and finished second against Progressive Conservative incumbent Obie Baizley.

== Walter McDonald (Dufferin) ==
McDonald finished in first place on the first count with 1,833 votes (45.00%), and was declared elected on the second count.

== Frank Casper (Emerson) ==
Casper was a farmer in Ridgeville, a graduate of the University of Manitoba and a veteran of the Royal Canadian Air Force. He was 35 years old at the time of the election, and had been president of the Emerson Liberal-Progressive Association since 1949.

He won the Liberal-Progressive nomination on April 21, 1953, defeating incumbent legislator John Solomon. Solomon's supporters subsequently alleged that the nomination meeting was conducted improperly, and Solomon himself entered the contest as an Independent Liberal-Progressive. This split divided the local association. The Liberal-Progressive Party took the position that the meeting was conducted properly, and endorsed Casper as their candidate. Casper finished second on the first count with 2,155 votes (45.81%), and was lost to Solomon on the second count. There were later allegations of vote tampering.

When Solomon resigned from the legislature in 1957, Casper changed parties and won the Progressive Conservative nomination for a by-election on November 14 of the same year. He lost to Liberal-Progressive candidate John Tanchak by about 175 votes. Casper ran against Tanchak again as a Progressive Conservative in the 1958 provincial election, and this time lost by 979 votes.

== Michael N. Hryhorczuk (Ethelbert) ==
Hryhorczuk was elected on the first count with 1,948 votes (51.03%).

== James Anderson (Fairford) ==
Anderson finished first on the first count with 1,072 votes (47.27%), and was declared elected on transfers.

== Nicholas Bachynsky (Fisher) ==
Bachynsky was elected on the first count with 1,554 votes (59.45%).

== Ray Mitchell (Gilbert Plains) ==
Mitchell finished first on the first count with 1,069 votes (34.12%), and was declared elected on transfers.

== Steinn O. Thompson (Gimli) ==
Thompson was elected on the first count with 2,252 votes (67.97%).

== William Morton (Gladstone) ==
Morton was the only candidate in the 1953 election to be returned without opposition. He sailed for England shortly after his re-election was confirmed, as a representative from Manitoba to the coronation of Elizabeth II.

== Charles Shuttleworth (Hamiota) ==
Shuttleworth finished first on the first count with 1,599 votes (47.72%), and was declared elected on the second count.

== C. Henry Jarvis (Iberville) ==
Jarvis was a farmer in Dacotoh, and was 43 years old at the time of the election. He was educated at Kelvin Technical High School, and served in the Royal Canadian Air Force for four years in World War II. He was the chair of the local school board at the time of his nomination, and was secretary of the Iberville Liberal-Progressive Association.

Jarvis placed second on the first count with 1,247 votes (33.45%), and lost to Progressive Conservative incumbent John McDowell on the second count.

== J. Leslie Bodie (Kildonan—Transcona) ==
Bodie was an industrial relations manager of the Dominion Bridge Company in Winnipeg, and was the Mayor of East Kildonan at the time of the election. Early in 1953, he emerged as a prominent supporter of municipal ownership for the Winnipeg transit system.

Bodie was initially a member of the Cooperative Commonwealth Federation, but campaigned for the House of Commons of Canada in the 1949 federal election as a candidate of the Progressive Conservative Party in Springfield. He finished third against Liberal candidate John Sylvester Sinnott.

Bodie won the Liberal-Progressive nomination in 1953 over Bernie Wolfe and Frank Simmons. In the general election, he finished second on the first count with 4,394 votes (36.31%), and lost to Cooperative Commonwealth Federation candidate Russell Paulley on the second count.

== Cliff W. Landerkin (Killarney) ==
Landerkin resided in Pilot Mound at the time of the election. He received 1,230 votes (33.41%) on the first count, and lost to Progressive Conservative candidate Abram Harrison on the second count.

== Douglas Campbell (Lakeside) ==
Premier Campbell was elected on the first count with 2,290 votes (56.13%), winning every poll in the constituency.

== Matthew R. Sutherland (Lansdowne) ==
Sutherland placed first on the first count with 2,014 votes (46.99%), and was declared elected on the second count.

== Edmond Brodeur (La Verendrye) ==
Brodeur was elected in a two-candidate contest with 2,203 votes (58.30%).

== Chris D. McLean (Manitou-Morden) ==
McLean was a farmer in Kaledia, Manitoba. He finished in second place on the first count with 1,054 votes (30.84%), and was defeated on the second count by Hugh Morrison of the Progressive Conservative Party.

== Henry S. Rungay (Minnedosa) ==
Rungay served in the legislature from 1948 to 1953. He finished first on the first count with 1,433 votes (36.92%), but fell behind on transfers and unexpectedly lost to Gilbert Hutton of the Social Credit Party on the second count.

== Arthur S. Beaubien (Morris) ==
Beaubien was the son of Arthur-Lucien Beaubien, who was a member of the House of Commons of Canada from 1921 to 1940, and served in the Senate of Canada from 1940 until his death in 1969. The younger Beaubien was an insurance agent, and was the Reeve of Montcalm at the time of the election. He won the Liberal-Progressive nomination in 1953 over Henry Magerell, 69 votes to 57.

In the general election, he finished second to Independent incumbent Harry Shewman on the first count with 1,191 votes (33.43%), and was defeated on the second count.

== Ivan Schultz (Mountain) ==
Schultz, a cabinet minister, was elected over two opponents with 1,851 votes (58.87%).

== Samuel Burch (Norfolk—Beautiful Plains) ==
Burch finished first on the first count with 2,133 votes (43.60%) and was declared elected on transfers.

== Charles Greenlay (Portage la Prairie) ==
Greenlay finished first on the first count with 1,653 votes (43.89%), and was declared elected on transfers.

== Wallace C. Miller (Rhineland) ==
Miller, a cabinet minister and former Progressive Conservative, was elected over two opponents with 1,608 votes (51.26%).

== Ronald Robertson (Roblin) ==
Robertson was declared elected on the first count with 1,474 votes (50.26%).

== Roy Brown (Rupertsland) ==
Brown finished first on the first count with 1,136 votes (49.31%), and was declared elected on the second count.

== Thomas Hillhouse (St. Andrews) ==
Hillhouse was elected on the first count with 2,938 votes (57.14%).

== Roger Teillet (St. Boniface) ==
Teillet finished in first place on the first count, and retained this position to the sixth and final count when he was declared elected with 6,220 votes (31.80%).

== L. Raymond Fennell (St. Boniface) ==
Fennell finished in second place on the first count, and retained this position to the sixth and final count to be declared elected for the second position. He received 4,886 votes (24.98%) on the last count.

== Stanley Copp (St. Clements) ==
Copp won the Liberal-Progressive nomination by six votes over Fred Klym. Klym later entered the contest as an Independent Liberal-Progressive, but withdrew before election day. Copp was elected on the first count with 2,970 votes (51.19%).

== Christian Halldorson (St. George) ==
Halldorson was elected in a two-candidate contest with 1,695 votes (84.08%).

== Gildas Molgat (Ste. Rose) ==
Molgat finished first on the first count with 1,369 votes (40.95%), and was declared elected on the second count.

== William Lucko (Springfield) ==
Lucko, a sitting MLA, won a contested nomination against Archie Wawryshyn of Tyndall. He placed first on the first count in the general election with 1,837 votes (47.78%), and was declared elected on the second count.

== Francis Jobin (The Pas) ==
Jobin was elected on the first count with 4,875 votes (60.42%).

== Charles Gorrie (Turtle Mountain) ==
Gorrie was the mayor of Wawanesa at the time of the election. He finished second in Turtle Mountain with 883 votes (27.88%). The winner was Errick Willis, leader of the Progressive Conservative Party.

== Gordon A. Mooney (Virden) ==
Mooney was the nephew of Robert Mooney, who served as the MLA for Virden from 1922 until his death in January 1953. He was a farmer in the Woodsworth District, served as Reeve of Pipestone from three years, and was a councillor for thirteen. He defeated James Clarke of Elkhorn for the nomination.

He received 1,621 votes (42.62%), losing to Progressive Conservative candidate John Thompson in a straight two-way contest.

== Jack St. John (Winnipeg Centre) ==
St. John finished third on the first count, and was declared elected for the third position on the ninth count with 5,119 votes (24.88%).

== Nan Murphy (Winnipeg Centre) ==
Murphy was a prominent school trustee in Winnipeg at the time of the election, and was also Winnipeg's representative on the Manitoba School Trustees's board of directors. She was a member of the Civic Election Committee at the municipal level. Murphy finished sixth on the first count with 1,565 votes (7.61%), and remained in this position throughout the counting process. She was eliminated following the eighth count with 1,991 votes (9.68%). Murphy was re-elected to the Winnipeg School Board later in the year, topping the polls for Ward Two in the 1953 Winnipeg municipal election.

She ran for the Manitoba legislature again in the 1958 provincial election, after the multi-member constituencies of Winnipeg were eliminated and replaced with single-member divisions. Murphy finished third in St. Matthews, finished 994 votes behind Progressive Conservative candidate William G. Martin.

== David A. Graham (Winnipeg Centre) ==
Graham was a health inspector. He was on the left wing of the Liberal-Progressive Party, and supported several initiatives also favoured by the socialist Cooperative Commonwealth Federation. Graham was a defender of rent controls within Winnipeg, supported slum clearance, and argued that Winnipeg should have 17 to 18 representatives in the legislature.

He campaigned for the House of Commons of Canada in the 1945 federal election as a candidate of the Liberal Party of Canada, and lost to CCF incumbent Stanley Knowles by 10,243 votes.

Graham finished eighth on the first count in 1953 with 831 votes (4.04%), and was eliminated following the fifth count with 879 votes (4.27%). He ran again in the 1958 provincial election, and finished third in Assiniboia against Donovan Swailes of the CCF.

He campaigned for the provincial legislature a third time in the 1959 election, and this time finished third against Progressive Conservative candidate Douglas Stanes in the St. James.

Note: The Liberal-Progressives nominated three candidates in Winnipeg Centre. St. John, Murphy and Graham won the nomination over barrister Arthur Schroeder and incumbent Member of the Legislative Assembly (MLA) Paul Bardal, who was ill at the time of the meeting.

== Alex Turk (Winnipeg North) ==
Turk, a local wrestling promoter, finished seventh on the first count with 1,622 votes (7.50%). He performed well on transfers, however, and was unexpectedly elected to the fourth position on the eighth count with 3,134 votes (14.50%).

== John Michael Kozoriz (Winnipeg North) ==
Kozoriz was a teacher, and a perennial candidate for office. He first campaigned for the Manitoba legislature in the 1949 provincial election, and placed fifth in Winnipeg North on the first count with 1,804 votes. He remained in fifth place on the eighth and final count with 2,809 votes, some distance behind the fourth-place candidate.

In 1953, Kozoriz finished fourth on the first count with 1,863 votes (8.62%), but fell behind on transfers and once again finished fifth on the final count with 3,082 votes (14.26%). He was narrowly defeated for the fourth position by fellow Liberal-Progressive Alex Turk.

Kozoriz ran a third time in the 1959 provincial election, in the single-member constituency of Logan. He finished third, against Lemuel Harris of the Cooperative Commonwealth Federation. He ran a fourth time in the 1962 election, and came within 209 votes of defeating New Democratic Party incumbent Steve Peters in Elmwood.

Kozoriz campaigned a fifth time in the 1966 election, and fell to third place in Elmwood against NDP newcomer Russell Doern. He again finished third against Doern in the 1969 election, as the NDP took office for the first time with a minority government.

== John J. Kelsch Sr. (Winnipeg North) ==
Kelsch was a plumbing and heating contractor in Winnipeg. He finished eighth on the first count with 1,173 votes (5.43%), and was eliminated after the third count with 1,282 votes (5.93%).

Turk, Kozoriz and Kelsch were nominated for Winnipeg North on April 15, 1953, defeating former Winnipeg alderman E.A. Brotman. Brotman later entered the race as an Independent Liberal-Progressive.

== Ronald Turner (Winnipeg South) ==
Turner, a prominent cabinet minister, first in first place on the first count and was declared elected with 8,007 votes (27.49%), the highest total of any candidate in the province and well over the 20% quota.

== George P. Macleod (Winnipeg South) ==
Macleod was educated at the University of Manitoba, and received a Bachelor of Laws degree. He was made a King's Counsel in 1945. Macleod served for eight years on the Winnipeg School Board, and was its chair for two. He also served on the Winnipeg city council from 1951 to 1953, representing Ward One. He was defeated in his bid for re-election in 1952, after placing fourth out of four candidates. (Each ward elected three members by the single transferable vote.)

In the 1953 election, Macleod argued that Winnipeg deserved greater representation in the legislature. He placed sixth on the first count with 1,806 votes (6.20%), and finished fifth on the seventh and final count with 3,889 votes (13.35%). He was 59 years old at the time of the election.
