= Progressive Conservative Party of Manitoba candidates in the 1953 Manitoba provincial election =

Listing of candidates

The Progressive Conservative Party of Manitoba ran 38 candidates in the 1953 provincial election, twelve of these candidates were elected. Under the leadership of Errick Willis, the Progressive Conservatives formed the official opposition in the legislature. Some candidates have their own biography pages; information about others may be founded here.

Between 1940 and 1950, Manitoba had been administered by a coalition government led by the Liberal-Progressive Party. The Progressive Conservatives, who had been the secondary power in the coalition, left the government in 1950. This decision split the party, and a number of Progressive Conservatives either retired or chose to remain on the government side.

After ten years of coalition government, the Progressive Conservative Party's provincial machinery had largely fallen into disrepair. The party was not able to field a full slate of candidates, and had difficulty mounting effective campaigns in some regions.

The 1953 Manitoba election was determined by instant-runoff voting in most constituencies. Three constituencies (Winnipeg Centre, Winnipeg North and Winnipeg South) returned four members by the single transferable vote (STV), with a 20% quota for election. St. Boniface elected two members by STV, with a 33% quota. The Progressive Conservatives ran three candidates in Winnipeg South, two in St. Boniface and Winnipeg Centre, and one in Winnipeg North.

In Kildonan—Transcona, the local Progressive Conservative association endorsed independent candidate Steve Melnyk. In St. George, the association endorsed Liberal-Progressive incumbent Chris Halldorson. Harry Shewman, an Independent candidate in Morris, also seems to have been at least tacitly endorsed by the Progressive Conservative Party.

The party also did not field candidates in Carillon, Emerson, Fisher, Gimli, Gladstone, La Verendrye, Mountain or The Pas.

The party also did not contest the deferred elections in Rupertsland and Ste. Rose. Progressive Conservatives candidate had been nominated for both divisions, but in each case the candidate withdrew before election day.

== J. Arthur Ross (Arthur) ==
Ross was elected in a two-candidate contest with 1,920 votes (57.14%). See his biography page for more information.

== George E. Fournier (Assiniboia) ==
Fournier was born in Winnipeg, and was an employee for the Canadian Pacific Railway (CPR) for thirty-one years. He managed the CPR baseball club, and was a member of the Knights of Columbus. He finished third with 1,528 votes (17.68%) on the first count, and was eliminated. The winner was Reginald Wightman of the Liberal-Progressive Party.

Fournier died shortly after the election, on September 7, 1953, at age fifty-two. For the last fourteen years of his life, he had resided in the Winnipeg suburb of St. James.

== Francis Macdonald Manwaring (Birtle) ==
Manwaring was a late nominee in the contest. He received 957 votes (30.82%), losing to Liberal-Progressive candidate Francis Bell in a straight two-candidate contest.

== Reginald Lissaman (Brandon City) ==
Lissaman placed first on the first count with 3,514 votes (46.04%), and was declared elected on the second count. See his biography page for more information.

== Roderick George Hurton (Cypress) ==
Hurton was a doctor in Glenboro. He first campaigned for the Manitoba legislature in the 1936 provincial election as a Conservative candidate in Cypress, and narrowly lost to Liberal-Progressive incumbent James Christie. He ran against Christie again in the 1941 election as an independent coalition supporter, and lost by an increased margin.

Hurton finished second on the first count in 1953 with 1,198 votes (30.46%), and lost to new Liberal-Progressive candidate Francis Ferg on the second count. Christie had died earlier in the year.

== Ernest N. McGirr (Dauphin) ==
McGirr served in the Manitoba legislature from 1949 to 1953. He finished third on the first count in the 1953 election with 1,235 votes (23.83%), and was eliminated on transfers. The winner was William Bullmore of the Social Credit Party. See McGirr's biography page for more information.

== James O. Argue (Deloraine-Glenwood) ==
Argue was elected in a two-candidate contest with 1,862 votes (53.88%). See his biography page for more information.

== Earl Collins (Dufferin) ==
Collins served in the Manitoba legislature from 1943 to 1949. He finished third out of three candidates in 1953 with 911 votes (22.37%). See his biography page for more information.

== John L. Solomon (Ethelbert) ==
Solomon finished third out of four candidates with 276 votes (7.23%). Liberal-Progressive candidate Michael N. Hryhorczuk was elected on the first count.

== Daniel McFadyen (Fairford) ==
McFadyen placed third out of four candidates on the first count with 288 votes (12.70%), and was eliminated. The winner was James Anderson of the Liberal-Progressive Party.

== Bardette Elliott (Gilbert Plains) ==
Elliott was a farmer and livestock dealer from Grandview. He defeated H.G. Bell and W.G. Chaloner for the Progressive Conservative nomination. In the general election, he finished fourth out of four candidates with 380 votes (12.18%).

== Edward P. Venables (Hamiota) ==
Venables first campaigned for the Manitoba legislature in the 1949 provincial election, as a Progressive Conservative coalitionist. He received 1,237 votes, and finished a close second against Liberal-Progressive candidate Charles Shuttleworth. He finished second again in 1953 with 1,227 votes (36.62%), losing to Shuttleworth on the second count.

== John McDowell (Iberville) ==
McDowell finished first on the first count with 1,442 votes (38.68%), and was declared elected on the second count. See his biography page for more information.

== Abram Harrison (Killarney) ==
Harrison finished first on the first count with 1,786 votes (48.51%), and was declared elected on the second count. See his biography page for more information.

== Charles H. Spence (Lakeside) ==
Spence was an insurance agent in Poplar Point. He won the Progressive Conservative nomination over Gordon Troop of Burnside. In the general election, he finished third out of four candidates with 662 votes (16.23%). Liberal-Progressive candidate Douglas Campbell, the Premier of Manitoba, won the constituency on the first count.

== Thomas H. Seens (Lansdowne) ==
Seens served in the Manitoba legislature from 1949 to 1953. He finished second on the first count with 1,563 votes (36.47%), and lost to Liberal-Progressive Matthew R. Sutherland on the second count. See his biography page for more information.

== Hugh Morrison (Manitou-Morden) ==
Morrison finished in first place on the first count with 1,606 votes (46.99%), and was declared elected on the second count. See his biography page for more information.

== John A. Burgess (Minnedosa) ==
Burgess was a merchant in Minnedosa, and a former mayor of the community. He defeated a young insurance executive named Ralph B. Clarke for the nomination; a third candidate, Percy Coutts of Newdale, withdrew before the vote. Burgess finished third out of three candidates with 1,047 (26.98%). His transfers gave an unexpected victory to Social Credit candidate Gilbert Hutton, who had finished second on the first count.

== Harold Alexander Nelson (Norfolk—Beautiful Plains) ==
Nelson was a farmer in the Carberry district. He campaigned for the House of Commons of Canada in the 1949 federal election as a candidate of the Progressive Conservative Party of Canada, and finished second against Liberal candidate William Gilbert Weir in Portage—Neepawa. He ran for the provincial party later in the year, as a candidate for Norfolk—Beautiful Plains in the 1949 provincial election. He again finished second, against Liberal-Progressive candidate Samuel Burch.

Nelson fell to third place in 1953, receiving 1,365 votes (27.90%) in a three-candidate race. Burch was again declared the winner.

== William C. Warren (Portage la Prairie) ==
Warren was born in Oakland, Manitoba, and was 36 years old at the time of the election. He had served with the Royal Canadian Air Force in World War II, was shot down over Germany in 1942, and spent two-and-a-half years in a prisoner of war camp. He worked as a teacher after returning to Canada.

He finished second on the first count in 1953 with 1,329 votes (35.29%), and lost to Liberal-Progressive candidate Charles Greenlay on the second count.

== Leo A. Recksiedler (Rhineland) ==
Recksiedler was a farmer in Rosenfeld, Manitoba. He was nominated in 1953 to challenge Wallace C. Miller, a provincial cabinet minister who had been elected as a Progressive Conservative, but crossed to the Liberal-Progressive benches after the coalition government came to an end. At the nomination meeting, chair A.J. Thiessen made the following comment: “We have no desire to run down our present representative, but we feel it is the democratic right of the citizens of Rhineland to express their wishes at the ballot” (Winnipeg Free Press, 6 February 1953). His supporters claimed that Rhineland needed a representative who understood the concerns of farmers. Miller was re-elected, while Recksiedler finished third with 565 votes (18.01%).

Recksiedler ran against Miller again in the 1959 provincial election, and finished a much closer second. Miller subsequently died in office, and Recksiedler once again campaigned for the legislature in a by-election held on November 26, 1959. He was narrowly defeated by Jacob Froese of the Social Credit Party.

== Fred E. Cowan (Roblin) ==
Cowan was born in Killarney, Manitoba. He was a bookkeeper in Roblin, and was sixty years old at the time of the election. He finished fourth out of four candidates with 227 votes (7.74%).

== H.G. Langrell (Rockwood) ==
Langrell finished second out of three candidates with 656 votes (21.89%). Independent Liberal-Progressive candidate Robert Bend was elected on the first count.

== Keith Porter (Russell) ==
Porter was a resident of Binscarth. He finished third out of four candidates on the first count with 723 votes (17.51%), and was subsequently eliminated. The winner was Independent Liberal-Progressive candidates Rodney S. Clement.

== Keith H. Robson (St. Andrews) ==
Robson was a doctor. He finished second with 1,366 votes (26.57%), losing on the first ballot to Liberal-Progressive candidate Thomas Hillhouse.

== Raymond Hughes (St. Boniface) ==
Hughes was an alderman in St. Boniface at the time of the election. He finished fifth on the first count with 2,101 votes (10.74%), and was eliminated after the fourth count with 2,568 votes (13.13%).

== Louis Leger (St. Boniface) ==
Leger was also an alderman in St. Boniface at the time of the election. He had previously worked as a clerk.

He campaigned for the House of Commons of Canada in the 1949 federal election, and finished third out of three candidates with 2,557 votes. The winner was Fernand Viau of the Liberal Party of Canada. In 1953, he finished eighth out of eight candidates on the first count with 737 votes (3.77%), and was eliminated.

== Walter H. Whyte (St. Clements) ==
Whyte finished fourth out of four candidates with 378 votes (6.51%). Liberal-Progressive candidate Stanley Copp was declared elected on the first count.

== A.H. Watt (Springfield) ==
Watt was filling station operator, and a resident of Rennie. He finished third out of three candidates in the general election with 643 votes (16.72%). The winner was William Lucko of the Liberal-Progressive Party.

== George Renouf (Swan River) ==
Renouf placed first on the first count with 2,383 votes (49.32%), and was subsequently declared elected on transfers. See his biography page for more information.

== Errick Willis (Turtle Mountain) ==
Willis, the party leader, was elected on the first count with 1,777 votes (56.11%). See his biography page for more information.

== John Thompson (Virden) ==
Thompson defeated Clarence Moore and W.T. Cann to win the Progressive Conservative nomination on December 19, 1952. He was elected on the first count with 2,182 votes (57.38%). See his biography page for more information.

== Hank Scott (Winnipeg Centre) ==
Scott finished fourth on the first count with 2,085 votes (10.13%), and was declared elected to the fourth position on the tenth count with 3,108 votes (15.11%). See his biography page for more information.

== Joseph Stepnuk (Winnipeg Centre) ==
Stepnuk received 478 votes (2.32%) on the first count, finishing eleventh out of fourteen candidates. He was eliminated after the third count, having increased his total to 489 votes (2.38%). During the campaign, Stepnuk argued that Canadian resources should be chiefly for domestic use, not for export. He also used the slogan, "Vote Conservative for Winnipeg - reduce taxes".

Stepnuk later campaigned in Elmwood in the 1958 provincial election, and finished in third place with 1,084 votes. The winner was Steve Peters of the Manitoba Cooperative Commonwealth Federation.

Note: The Progressive Conservatives nominated Scott and Stepnuk for Winnipeg Centre on December 1, 1952, and indicated that other candidates might follow. None did.

== Stanley M. Carrick (Winnipeg North) ==
Carrick was a councillor in Winnipeg for many years, serving with the centre-right Civic Election Committee. He was first elected to the city council in 1952 for Ward 3, which covered the city's north end. At the time, Winnipeg's three wards elected six members to council in two-year staggered terms, with members chosen by the single transferable vote. Carrick finished fourth on the first count in 1952, but performed well enough on transfers to defeat incumbent Jacob Penner by 17 votes on the fifth and final count. Penner was a member of the Communist Labour Progressive Party, and his defeat brought a temporary end to Communist representation on the council.

He first ran for the Manitoba legislature in the 1949 provincial election, as a Progressive Conservative candidate supporting the governing alliance with the Liberal-Progressives. He finished eighth on the first count with 1,126 votes, and was eliminated after the fifth count with 1,384.

Carrick was nominated for the 1953 election as the lone Progressive Conservative candidate in Winnipeg North, defeating challenger John F. Kubas. He finished fifth on the first count with 1,795 votes, and was eliminated after the sixth count with 2,373 votes. During this election, he used the slogan, "Was a good school trustee, is a good alderman, will be a good MLA".

After the provincial campaign, Carrick sought the federal Progressive Conservative nomination in Winnipeg North for the 1953 federal election. He was defeated by John Kereluk.

He ran for the legislature a third time in the 1958 election, after Winnipeg's multi-member constituencies had been replaced with single-member divisions. He finished second in St. John's, losing to David Orlikow of the Cooperative Commonwealth Federation by 1,200 votes.

== Dufferin Roblin (Winnipeg South) ==
Roblin was declared elected to the second position on the first ballot. He became leader of the Progressive Conservative Party in 1954, and Premier of Manitoba in 1958. See his biography page for more information.

== Gurney Evans (Winnipeg South) ==
Evans was declared elected to the fourth position on the seventh and final count. During the campaign, he used the slogan "Better government demands better plans". He later served as a cabinet minister under Roblin. See his biography page for more information.

== Maude McCreery (Winnipeg South) ==
McCreery was a Winnipeg city councillor at the time of the election. Serving as a member of the Civic Election Committee. Shortly before the election, she was one of five councillors to oppose a bill outlawing racial discrimination in the workplace.

McCreery was the first woman to run for provincial office in Manitoba as a candidate of the Progressive Conservative Party. She finished fifth on the first count with 1,820 votes (6.25%), and was eliminated on the sixth count with 2,318 votes (7.96%).

She was re-elected to the Winnipeg City Council for Ward One in the 1953 Winnipeg municipal election, held a few months after the provincial contest.

The Progressive Conservatives also endorsed Independent candidate Steve Melnyk in Kildonan—Transcona.
