= Manitoba Cooperative Commonwealth Federation candidates in the 1953 Manitoba provincial election =

The Manitoba Cooperative Commonwealth Federation existed from 1933 to 1961, and was the dominant socialist party in the province during its existence.

The party nominated 25 candidates in the 1953 provincial election, five of whom were elected. Some candidates have their own biography pages; information on other candidates may be found here.

The 1953 Manitoba election was conducted by instant-runoff voting in most constituencies. Three constituencies (Winnipeg North, Winnipeg Centre and Winnipeg South) returned four members by the single transferable vote (STV), with a 20% quota for election. St. Boniface returned two members by STV, with a 33% quota.

The CCF's 1953 platform contained fourteen points, foremost of which was a plan for a provincial hospital scheme similar to that undertaken by Tommy Douglas in neighbouring Saskatchewan. The party also supported state automobile insurance, a restructuring of the provincial municipalities, needs-based grants to municipalities for road repair, a provincial labour code, and lowering the voting age to eighteen. Party leader Lloyd Stinson later argued that the election was essentially about three things: hospitalization, education and electoral redistribution.

There is no doubt that the party was at a disadvantage as a result of their decision to run only 25 candidates. There were 57 seats in the Manitoba legislature, so a majority government for the CCF was mathematically impossible to win. Stinson later acknowledged that this situation hurt the party's image, and marginalized it with the electorate.

Tom Kobzey planned to run for the CCF in Emerson. He was reportedly threatened with violence from a vigilante group, and was forced to leave the area.

== Alvin H. Mackling (Assiniboia) ==
Alvin H. Mackling served in the Manitoba legislature from 1969 to 1973 and again from 1981 to 1988, and was a prominent cabinet minister in the governments of Edward Schreyer and Howard Pawley. In the 1953 election, he placed second out of four candidates on the first count with 3,078 votes (35.62%), and lost to Liberal-Progressive candidate Reginald Wightman on the second count. See his biography page for more information.

== Frank Fulbrook (Dauphin) ==
Fulbrook was an automotive service manager, and a shop foreman at his garage. during his nomination meeting, the Dauphin CCF affirmed its support for a provincial hospital scheme and state automobile insurance. Fulbrook placed last in a field of four candidates with 785 votes (15.15%). The winner was William Bullmore of the Social Credit Party.

== Harry Basaraba (Ethelbert) ==
Basaraba finished second out of four candidates with 1,368 votes (35.84%). The winner was Michael N. Hryhorczuk of the Liberal-Progressive Party, who won on the first count.

== John A. McDonald (Fairford) ==
McDonald finished fourth out of four candidates with 249 votes (10.98%). The winner was Liberal-Progressive candidate James Anderson.

== Elsie Lyon (Fisher) ==
Lyon received 211 votes (8.07%), finishing third out of four candidates. Liberal-Progressive candidate Nicholas Bachynsky was elected on the first count.

== Robert J. Wilson (Gilbert Plains) ==
Wilson was a young farmer in Grandview at the time of the election, and was also known as a skilled baseball player. He defeated four other candidates for the CCF nomination. Wilson finished a strong second on the first count with 989 votes (31.57%), but lost to Liberal-Progressive candidate Ray Mitchell on transfers.

== John C. Hilgenga (Iberville) ==
Hilgenga lived in Charleswood, and also owned a farm in Dominion City. He placed third out of four candidates on the first count with 665 votes (17.41%), and was eliminated. The winner was John McDowell of the Progressive Conservative Party.

Hilgenga later campaigned for the CCF's successor party, the New Democratic Party, in the 1969 provincial election. He placed third in Charleswood against Progressive Conservative candidate Arthur Moug.

== Russell Paulley (Kildonan—Transcona) ==
Paulley was Mayor of Transcona at the time of the election. He won the CCF nomination over sitting MLA George Olive in early April 1953. In the general election, He placed first on the first count with 5,770 votes (47.68%), and was declared elected on the second count. Paulley became the leader of the Manitoba CCF in 1959. See his biography page for more information.

== Hazel C. Allan (Lakeside) ==
Allan was a resident of Macgregor. She received 342 votes (8.38%), finishing fourth out of four candidates. The winner was Liberal-Progressive candidate Douglas Campbell, the Premier of Manitoba.

== Joseph Perchaluk (Roblin) ==
Perchaluk finished second out of four candidates with 866 votes (29.53%). Liberal-Progressive candidate Ronald Robertson was declared elected on the first count.

Perchaluk contested Roblin again in the 1959 provincial election, and finished a second against Progressive Conservative candidate Keith Alexander with 1,569 votes. He ran a third time in the 1966 election, after the CCF had become the New Democratic Party, and once again finished second with 1,583 votes. The winner on this occasion was Progressive Conservative Wally McKenzie.

== Michael J. Sotas (Russell) ==
Sotas was a farmer in Rossburn. He finished second on the first count with 1,190 votes (28.83%), and lost to Independent Liberal-Progressive candidate Rodney S. Clement on transfers.

Sotas later campaigned for the federal Cooperative Commonwealth Federation in Marquette for the 1958 federal election, receiving 1,572 votes and finishing third against Progressive Conservative candidate Nicholas Mandziuk. He campaigned for the provincial CCF again in the 1959 provincial election, and finished third against Progressive Conservative candidate Robert Smellie in Birtle-Russell.

Sotas was also active with the CCF's successor party, the New Democratic Party. He ran for the national New Democratic Party in the 1963 federal election, and finished fourth in Marquette with 981 votes. Mandziuk was again the winner. Sotas contested Dauphin for the provincial NDP in the 1966 provincial election, and finished third against Progressive Conservative candidate Stewart McLean with 236 votes.

The NDP formed government in Manitoba following the 1969 election, and Sotas ran for the party again in Birtle-Russell in the 1973 provincial election. This was the closest he ever came to winning, finished a close second against Progressive Conservative candidate Harry Graham.

== Ernest Draffin (St. Andrews) ==
Draffin served in the Manitoba legislature from 1945 to 1949. He finished third out of three candidates in 1953 with 838 votes (16.30%). Liberal-Progressive candidate Thomas Hillhouse was elected on the first count. See his biography page for more information

== David Turner (St. Boniface) ==
Turner was endorsed by Winnipeg's labour movement, and made labour and health issues the primary focus of his campaign. He argued that the average wage-earner's housing problems were ignored under the Liberal-Progressive government, and that there was insufficient hospital space available. He placed fourth on the first count with 2,707 votes (13.84%), but improved to a third-place position on later counts. He narrowly missed election to the second position on the sixth and final count, losing to Liberal-Progressive candidate L. Raymond Fennell by 389 votes. Turner was later nominated for the federal Cooperative Commonwealth Federation candidacy in Winnipeg South for the 1953 Canadian election, but declined.

== Kay E. McKinnon (St. Boniface) ==
Kay E. McKinnon was the daughter of Canadian labour pioneer Roger E. Bray. She served as secretary of the CCF for the Ontario riding of Kenora—Rainy River, and was a member of the World Government Association. She finished in sixth place on the first count with 1,293 votes, and was not elected (St. Boniface elected two members by a single transferable ballot during this period).

== Edgar E. Smee (St. Clements) ==
Smee was a summer resort proprietor. He was nominated in Lac du Bonnet on May 8, 1953. He received 1,495 votes (25.77%), losing to Liberal-Progressive candidate Stanley Copp on the first count.

Smee campaigned for the national Cooperative Commonwealth Federation in the 1957 federal election, and finished fourth out of four candidates in Portage—Neepawa with 1,630 votes. The winner was George Fairfield of the Progressive Conservative.

== Sam Einarson (Swan River) ==
Einarson was born in Iceland, and moved to Manitoba in 1910. He was educated in Arborg, and enlisted to serve in World War I at age 17. After the war, he worked as a farmer in Minitonas, Manitoba.

He first campaigned for the Manitoba legislature in the 1932 provincial election, as an independent candidate in Swan River. He finished second to Progressive Conservative George Renouf on the second count, losing by only 51 votes. Einarson joined the national Cooperative Commonwealth Federation when it was formed later in the year.

He finished third in 1953 with 757 votes (15.67%). Renouf again won the constituency.

== Arthur W. Thompson (The Pas) ==
Thompson was a civil engineer, and was 52 years old at the time of the election. He had been a member of the Ontario Labour Party from 1927 to 1933, and joined the national Cooperative Commonwealth Federation upon its founding. After moving to Manitoba, he worked for the Hudson Bay Mining and Smelting Company. Thompson finished third with 1,526 votes (18.91%). Liberal-Progressive candidate Francis Jobin won on the first count.

== Donovan Swailes (Winnipeg Centre) ==
Swailes finished in first place on the first count with 3,910 votes (19.01%), and was declared elected to the first position on the fifth count. See his biography page for more information.

== Gordon R. Fines (Winnipeg Centre) ==
Fines served as a Member of the Legislative Assembly from 1949 to 1953. He finished seventh on the first count in 1953 with 1,080 votes (5.25%), and was eliminated following the seventh count with 1,339 votes (6.51%). Fines's chances for re-election in 1953 were hurt by the independent candidacies of Stephen Juba and Lewis Stubbs. See his biography page for more information.

== G.S. Borgford (Winnipeg Centre) ==
Borgford was the regional director of the Canadian Congress of Labour, and a prominent figure in the Winnipeg labour movement. He won the third CCF position for Winnipeg Centre on May 12, 1953, after E.H. Cove, Walter Seaberg and A.E. Vandurme withdrew from the contest. He finished tenth on the first count with 541 votes (2.63%), and was eliminated after the fourth count with 558 votes (2.71%).

Borgford was nominated by Lloyd Stinson to serve on the Winnipeg Police Commission in 1969, but was defeated by a vote of the Winnipeg City Council.

== Morris Gray (Winnipeg North) ==
Gray finished in first place on the first count with 4,642 votes (21.48%) and was declared elected to the first position. See his biography page for more information.

== John Hawryluk (Winnipeg North) ==
Hawryluk finished third on the first count with 2,857 votes (13.22%). He later overtook second-place candidate Bill Kardash of the Labour Progressive Party and was elected for the second position on the seventh count with 4,793 votes (22.18%). See his biography page for more information.

== Len Aylen (Winnipeg North) ==
At the time of the election, Aylen led the United Packinghouse Workers Local 216 in Winnipeg and was chair of the political action committee of the Winnipeg Labour Council. He finished ninth on the first count with 1,122 votes (5.19%), and was eliminated after the fourth count with 1,325 votes (6.13%).

Gray, Hawryluk and Aylen were nominated on March 11, 1953. The CCF initially planned to nominate a fourth candidate in Winnipeg North, but did not follow up on this.

== Lloyd Stinson (Winnipeg South) ==
Stinson was chosen as CCF leader shortly before the election. He finished third on the first count with 4,934 votes (16.94%), and was declared elected on the sixth count with 5,972 votes (20.50%). See his biography page for more information.

== A. Montague Israels (Winnipeg South) ==
Israels was the vice-president of the Manitoba CCF at the time of the 1953 election, and was active in the Winnipeg labour movement. At his nomination meeting, he criticized the tax status of the Canadian Pacific Railway in Winnipeg. He finished seventh on the first count with 1,117 votes (3.83%), and was eliminated after the fifth count with 1,234 votes (4.24%).

Israels delivered the cleverest line of the campaign shortly before election day, when he said that Progressive Conservative leader Errick Willis had been "too recently in Mr. Campbell's arms to be now at his throat". This referred to the fact that Willis and Premier Douglas Campbell had been partners in the coalition government of the 1940s, implementing many of the policies which Willis now described as insufficient.

After the election, Israels was named as labour's representative on the Winnipeg Wage Survey Board.
