= 1953 Manitoba general election =

- June 8, 1953

57 seats of the Legislative Assembly of Manitoba 29 seats needed for a majority
	First party	Second party	Third party
Leader	Douglas Campbell	Errick Willis	Lloyd Stinson
Party	Liberal–Progressive	Progressive Conservative	Co-operative Commonwealth
Leader since	November 13, 1948	June 9, 1936	December 19, 1952
Leader's seat	Lakeside	Turtle Mountain	Winnipeg South
Last election	25	9	7
Seats won	35	12	5
Seat change	▲10	▲3	▼2
Popular vote	117,887	56,278	44,332
Percentage	44.05%	21.03%	16.56%
Swing	▲5.35%	▲2.02%	▼9.04%
Premier before election
Douglas Lloyd Campbell
Liberal–Progressive
Premier after election
Douglas Lloyd Campbell
Liberal–Progressive

The 1953 Manitoba general election was held on June 8, 1953 to elect Members of the Legislative Assembly of the Province of Manitoba, Canada. The election produced a majority government for the Liberal-Progressive party led by Douglas Campbell. His party won thirty-two of fifty-seven seats although with but 39 per cent of the vote overall. To date this is the last election in which the Liberal Party won a majority of seats in Manitoba.

This was the first election held in Manitoba after the breakup of a ten-year coalition government led by the Liberal-Progressives and Progressive Conservatives. The coalition, which began in 1940, was ended in 1950 when the Progressive Conservatives crossed to the opposition side.

Prior to the 1949 election, Winnipeg's single at-large 10-member district was broken up into three four-member districts. The new districts, named Winnipeg Centre, Winnipeg North and Winnipeg South, elected four members each, through STV.

St. Boniface elected two members through STV.

(The 1953 election was to be the last provincial election in Manitoba to have multi-member districts and election by STV. After that election all Manitoba MLAs were elected through First-past-the-post voting in single-member districts.)

Each of the other districts elected one MLA using Instant-Runoff Voting. This was to be the last provincial election in Manitoba to use Instant-Runoff Voting in these districts.

The result of the election was a convincing victory for the Liberal-Progressive government of Premier Douglas Campbell, which won thirty-two of fifty-seven seats although with but 39 per cent of the vote overall.

Three Independent Liberal-Progressives were also elected.

The Progressive Conservatives, led by Errick Willis, saw their representation in the legislature increase from nine to twelve members. This was a disappointing result for many in the party. Willis had been a prominent cabinet minister in the coalition government, and many questioned the sincerity of his new-found opposition to Campbell's ministry. The following year, he lost the leadership of the party to Dufferin Roblin.

The social democratic Co-operative Commonwealth Federation (CCF) suffered a disappointment under new leader Lloyd Stinson, falling from seven seats to five. Its 17 per cent of the vote made it due about eight seats proportionally.

During the campaign, the Winnipeg Free Press newspaper devoted considerable attention to the return of the Social Credit Party in Manitoba. The party had not contested the previous provincial election, but was buoyed by the recent Social Credit victory in British Columbia and ran several candidates. The Free Press, which supported the Liberal-Progressives, and played up the threat of a Social Credit victory to rally popular support for the government. The actual threat posed by Social Credit was minimal: only two of its candidates were elected, although it did receive 13 per cent of the vote.

The Communist Labor-Progressive Party also won representation in the legislature, with party incumbent Bill Kardash taking one of the four constituency seats in Winnipeg North. This was the last time that a Communist candidate won election to the Manitoba legislature, or indeed to any provincial legislature in Canada.

Two independent candidates were elected. Stephen Juba, the mayor of Winnipeg, was one of them.

== Results ==
Party	Party leader	# of candidates	Seats			Popular vote		
Party	Party leader	# of candidates	1949	Elected	% Change	#	%	% Change
Liberal–Progressive	Douglas Campbell	50	25	32		104,976	39.22	
Independent Liberal-Progressive		7		3		12,911	4.82	
Total Government		57		35		117,887	44.05	
Progressive Conservative	Errick Willis	38	9	12		56,278	21.03	
Co-operative Commonwealth	Lloyd Stinson	25	7	5		44,332	16.56	
Social Credit	none	43	2	2		35,750	13.36	
Labor–Progressive	William Cecil Ross	1	1	1		3,812	1.42	
Independent		11	5	2		9,577	3.58	
Total		175	57	57		267,636	100	

Popular vote
Liberal-Progressive	44.05%
PC	21.03%
CCF	16.56%
Social Credit	13.36%
Labor-Progressive	1.42%
Others	3.58%

Seats summary
Liberal-Progressive	61.40%
PC	21.05%
CCF	8.77%
Social Credit	3.51%
Labor-Progressive	1.75%
Others	3.51%

== See also ==
- List of Manitoba political parties

== Constituency results ==
=== Single-member constituencies ===
Arthur:

Party	Candidate	Votes	%	±%
Progressive Conservative	J. Arthur Ross	1,920	57.14	
Liberal–Progressive	(incumbent)John R. Pitt	1,440	42.86	
Total valid votes		3,360	100.00	
Rejected votes		65		
Turnout		3,425	78.88	

Assiniboia:

First Count

Party	Candidate	Votes	%	±%
Liberal–Progressive	(incumbent)Reginald Wightman	3,359	38.87	
Co-operative Commonwealth Federation	Alvin H. Mackling	3,078	35.62	
Progressive Conservative	George E. Fournier	1,528	17.68	
Social Credit	Florence M. Bloomfield	677	7.83	
Total valid votes		8,642	100.00	
Rejected votes		56		
Turnout		8,698	57.50	

Fournier and Bloomfield were eliminated, and their votes were distributed as follows: Wightman 837, Mackling 768. 600 votes were non-transferable.

Final Count

Party	Candidate	Votes	%
Liberal–Progressive	(incumbent)Reginald Wightman	4,196	48.55
Co-operative Commonwealth Federation	Alvin H. Mackling	3,846	44.50
Exhausted votes		600	6.94

Birtle:

Party	Candidate	Votes	%	±%
Liberal–Progressive	(incumbent)Francis Bell	2,148	69.18	
Progressive Conservative	Francis Macdonald Manwaring	957	30.82	
Total valid votes		3,105	100.00	
Rejected votes		15		
Turnout		3,120	66.97	

Brandon City:

First Count

Party	Candidate	Votes	%	±%
Progressive Conservative	(incumbent)Reginald Lissaman	3,514	46.04	
Liberal–Progressive	James A. Creighton	3,063	40.13	
Social Credit	W.A. Wyborn	1,056	13.83	
Total valid votes		7,633	100.00	
Rejected votes		143		
Turnout		7,776	61.82	

Wyborn was eliminated, and his votes were distributed as follows: Lissaman 272, Creighton 138. 646 votes were non-transferable.

Second Count

Party	Candidate	Votes	%
Progressive Conservative	(incumbent)Reginald Lissaman	3,786	49.60
Liberal–Progressive	James A. Creighton	3,201	41.94
Votes Not Transferred		646	8.46

Carillon:

Party	Candidate	Votes	%	±%
Liberal–Progressive	(incumbent)Edmond Prefontaine	3,278	75.48	
Social Credit	K.T. Kroeker	1,065	24.52	
Total valid votes		4,343	100.00	
Rejected votes		111		
Turnout		4,454	69.44	

Cypress:

First Count

Party	Candidate	Votes	%	±%
Liberal–Progressive	Francis Ferg	1,785	45.39	
Progressive Conservative	Dr. Roderick George Hurton	1,198	30.46	
Social Credit	Marcel Philippe	950	24.15	
Total valid votes		3,933	100.00	
Rejected votes		50		
Turnout		3,983	70.78	

Ferg was subsequently declared elected on transfers from Philippe.

Dauphin:

First Count

Party	Candidate	Votes	%	±%
Social Credit	William Bullmore	1,668	32.19	
Liberal–Progressive	John Potoski	1,494	28.83	
Progressive Conservative	(incumbent)Ernest N. McGirr	1,235	23.83	
Co-operative Commonwealth Federation	Frank Fulbrook	785	15.15	
Total valid votes		5,182	100.00	
Rejected votes		205		
Turnout		5,387	77.48	

Bullmore was subsequently elected on transfers.

Deloraine-Glenwood:

Party	Candidate	Votes	%	±%
Progressive Conservative	(incumbent)James O. Argue	1,862	53.88	
Liberal–Progressive	Robert E. Moffat	1,594	46.12	
Total valid votes		3,456	100.00	
Rejected votes		16		
Turnout		3,472	72.76	

Dufferin:

First Count

Party	Candidate	Votes	%	±%
Liberal–Progressive	(incumbent)Walter McDonald	1,833	45.00	
Social Credit	George Loeppky	1,329	32.63	
Progressive Conservative	Earl Collins	911	22.37	
Total valid votes		4,073	100.00	
Rejected votes		163		
Turnout		4,236	72.96	

McDonald was subsequently elected on transfers from Collins.

Emerson:

First Count

Party	Candidate	Votes	%	±%
Liberal–Progressive	(incumbent)John Solomon	2,329	49.51	
Liberal–Progressive	Frank Casper	2,155	45.81	
Social Credit	George J. Friesen	220	4.68	
Total valid votes		4,704	100.00	
Rejected votes		93		
Turnout		4,797	83.40	

Solomon was subsequently declared elected on transfers from Friesen.

Ethelbert:

Party	Candidate	Votes	%	±%
Liberal–Progressive	(incumbent)Michael N. Hryhorczuk	1,948	51.03	
Co-operative Commonwealth Federation	Harry Basaraba	1,368	35.84	
Progressive Conservative	John L. Solomon	276	7.23	
Social Credit	Harry Dyck	225	5.89	
Total valid votes		3,817	100.00	
Rejected votes		102		
Turnout		3,919	75.99	

Fairford:

First Count

Party	Candidate	Votes	%	±%
Liberal–Progressive	(incumbent)James Anderson	1,072	47.27	
Social Credit	Fred G. Cook	659	29.06	
Progressive Conservative	Daniel McFadyen	288	12.70	
Co-operative Commonwealth Federation	John A. McDonald	249	10.98	
Total valid votes		2,268	100.00	
Rejected votes		58		
Turnout		2,326	67.26	

Joseph H. Kacher entered the contest as an Independent Liberal-Progressive, but withdrew before election day. Anderson was subsequently elected on transfers.

Fisher:

Party	Candidate	Votes	%	±%
Liberal–Progressive	(incumbent)Nicholas Bachynsky	1,554	59.45	
Independent	Leon W. Michalchuk	705	26.97	
Co-operative Commonwealth Federation	Elsie Lyon	211	8.07	
Social Credit	David Heindrichs	144	5.51	
Total valid votes		2,614	100.00	
Rejected votes		134		
Turnout		2,748	58.87	

Gilbert Plains:

First Count

Party	Candidate	Votes	%	±%
Liberal–Progressive	(incumbent)Ray Mitchell	1,069	34.12	
Co-operative Commonwealth Federation	Robert J. Wilson	989	31.57	
Social Credit	E.P. Brown	695	22.18	
Progressive Conservative	Bardette Elliott	380	12.13	
Total valid votes		3,133	100.00	
Rejected votes		50		
Turnout		3,183	78.11	

Brown and Elliott were eliminated, and their votes were transferred as follows: Mitchell 239, Wilson 222. 614 votes were non-transferable.

Final Count

Party	Candidate	Votes	%	±%
Liberal–Progressive	(incumbent)Ray Mitchell	1,308	41.75	
Co-operative Commonwealth Federation	Robert J. Wilson	1,211	38.65	
Votes Not Transferred		614	19.60	

Gimli:

Party	Candidate	Votes	%	±%
Liberal–Progressive	(incumbent)Steinn O. Thompson	2,252	67.97	
Social Credit	E.H. Fitch	867	26.17	
Independent	John Firman	194	5.86	
Total valid votes		3,313	100.00	
Rejected votes		48		
Turnout		3,361	54.15	

Gladstone:

Party	Candidate	Votes	%	±%
Liberal–Progressive	(incumbent)William Morton	accl.		

Hamiota:

First Count

Party	Candidate	Votes	%	±%
Liberal–Progressive	(incumbent)Charles Shuttleworth	1,599	47.72	
Progressive Conservative	Edward P. Venables	1,227	36.62	
Social Credit	Fred Charles	525	15.67	
Total valid votes		3,351	100.00	
Rejected votes		39		
Turnout		3,390	65.68	

Charles was eliminated, and his votes were distributed as follows: Venables 123, Shuttleworth 88. 314 votes were non-transferable.

Second Count

Party	Candidate	Votes	%
Liberal–Progressive	(incumbent)Charles Shuttleworth	1,687	50.34
Progressive Conservative	Edward P. Venables	1,350	40.29
Votes Not Transferred		314	9.37

Iberville:

First Count

Party	Candidate	Votes	%	±%
Progressive Conservative	(incumbent)John McDowell	1,442	38.68	
Liberal–Progressive	C. Henry Jarvis	1,247	33.45	
Co-operative Commonwealth Federation	John C. Hilgenga	665	17.41	
Social Credit	C.F. Rempel	374	9.79	
Total valid votes		3,728	100.00	
Rejected votes		91		
Turnout		3,819	63.13	

Hilgenga and Rempel were eliminated, and their votes were distributed as follows: Jarvis 207, McDowell 195. 637 votes were non-transferable.

Final Count

Party	Candidate	Votes	%
Progressive Conservative	(incumbent)John McDowell	1,637	43.91
Liberal–Progressive	C. Henry Jarvis	1,454	39.00
Votes Not Transferred		637	17.09

Kildonan—Transcona:

First Count

Party	Candidate	Votes	%	±%
Co-operative Commonwealth Federation	Russell Paulley	5,770	47.68	
Liberal–Progressive	J. Leslie Bodie	4,394	36.31	
Social Credit	Dr. L.G. Carson	1,117	9.23	
Independent	Steve Melnyk	820	6.78	
Total valid votes		12,101	100.00	
Rejected votes		247		
Turnout		12,348	61.91	

Although Melnyk ran as an independent, he was supported by the local Progressive Conservative association.

Both Carson and Melnyk were eliminated after the first count. Paulley received 275 additional votes on transfers, while Bodie received 163. It is assumed that all of these transfers came from Melynk's total, and that Paulley was declared elected before Carson's ballots were scrutinized. For the purposes of this article, Carson's final vote total is listed under "votes not transferred".

Second Count

Party	Candidate	Votes	%
Co-operative Commonwealth Federation	Russell Paulley	6,045	49.95
Liberal–Progressive	J. Leslie Bodie	4,557	37.66
Votes Not Transferred		1,499	17.09

Killarney:

First Count

Party	Candidate	Votes	%	±%
Progressive Conservative	(incumbent)Abram Harrison	1,786	48.51	
Liberal–Progressive	Cliff W. Landerkin	1,230	33.41	
Social Credit	G. Glen Paterson	666	18.09	
Total valid votes		3,682	100.00	
Rejected votes		51		
Turnout		3,733	75.70	

Harrison was subsequently elected on transfers from Paterson.

Lakeside:

Party	Candidate	Votes	%	±%
Liberal–Progressive	(incumbent)Douglas Campbell	2,290	56.13	
Social Credit	James William Lee Tully	786	19.26	
Progressive Conservative	Charles H. Spence	662	16.23	
Co-operative Commonwealth Federation	Hazel C. Allan	342	8.38	
Total valid votes		4,080	100.00	
Rejected votes		79		
Turnout		4,159	72.34	

Lansdowne:

First Count

Party	Candidate	Votes	%	±%
Liberal–Progressive	Matthew R. Sutherland	2,014	46.99	
Progressive Conservative	(incumbent)Thomas H. Seens	1,563	36.47	
Social Credit	R.W. Doherty	709	16.54	
Total valid votes		4,286	100.00	
Rejected votes		29		
Turnout		4,315	65.99	

Sutherland was subsequently elected on transfers from Doherty. The Winnipeg Free Press of June 12, 1953, indicates that Sutherland had 2,160 votes on the second count.

La Verendrye:

Party	Candidate	Votes	%	±%
Liberal–Progressive	(incumbent)Edmond Brodeur	2,203	58.30	
Social Credit	Damase Dufresne	1,576	41.70	
Total valid votes		3,779	100.00	
Rejected votes		53		
Turnout		3,832	62.93	

Manitou-Morden:

First Count

Party	Candidate	Votes	%	±%
Progressive Conservative	(incumbent)Hugh Morrison	1,606	46.99	
Liberal–Progressive	Chris D. McLean	1,054	30.84	
Social Credit	Albert O'Donnell	758	22.18	
Total valid votes		3,418	100.00	
Rejected votes		68		
Turnout		3,486	64.20	

Morrison was subsequently elected on transfers from O'Donnell.

Minnedosa:

First Count

Party	Candidate	Votes	%	±%
Liberal–Progressive	(incumbent)Henry S. Rungay	1,433	36.92	
Social Credit	Gilbert Hutton	1,401	36.10	
Progressive Conservative	John A. Burgess	1,047	26.98	
Total valid votes		3,881	100.00	
Rejected votes		71		
Turnout		3,952	77.46	

Hutton was subsequently elected on transfers from Burgess.

Morris:

First Count

Party	Candidate	Votes	%	±%
Independent	(incumbent)Harry Shewman	1,528	42.89	
Liberal–Progressive	Arthur S. Beaubien	1,191	33.43	
Social Credit	Wilbert James Tinkler	844	23.69	
Total valid votes		3,563	100.00	
Rejected votes		117		
Turnout		3,680	65.27	

Tinkler was eliminated, and his votes were distributed as follows: Shewman 432, Beaubien 58. 354 votes were not transferred.

Second Count

Party	Candidate	Votes	%
Independent	(incumbent)Harry Shewman	1,960	55.01
Liberal–Progressive	Arthur S. Beaubien	1,249	35.05
Votes Not Transferred		354	9.94

Mountain:

Party	Candidate	Votes	%	±%
Liberal–Progressive	(incumbent)Ivan Schultz	1,851	58.87	
Social Credit	Dollard E. Lafreniere	894	28.44	
Independent	John A. Mabon	399	12.69	
Total valid votes		3,144	100.00	
Rejected votes		25		
Turnout		3,169	65.48	

Norfolk-Beautiful Plains:

First Count

Party	Candidate	Votes	%	±%
Liberal–Progressive	(incumbent)Samuel Burch	2,133	43.60	
Social Credit	Charles J. McKinnon	1,394	28.50	
Progressive Conservative	Harold A. Nelson	1,365	27.90	
Total valid votes		4,892	100.00	
Rejected votes		44		
Turnout		4,936	59.96	

Nelson was eliminated, and his votes were distributed as follows: McKinnon 342, Burch 257. 766 votes were not transferred.

Party	Candidate	Votes	%	±%
Liberal–Progressive	(incumbent)Samuel Burch	2,390	48.86	
Social Credit	Charles J. McKinnon	1,736	35.49	
Votes Not Transferred		766	15.66	

Portage la Prairie:

First Count

Party	Candidate	Votes	%	±%
Liberal–Progressive	(incumbent)Charles Greenlay	1,653	43.89	
Progressive Conservative	William C. Warren	1,329	35.29	
Social Credit	Bernie H. Rempel	784	20.82	
Total valid votes		3,766	100.00	
Rejected votes		121		
Turnout		3,887	73.97	

Rempel was eliminated, and his votes were transferred as follows: Warren 200, Greenlay 94. 490 votes were non-transferable.

Party	Candidate	Votes	%
Liberal–Progressive	(incumbent)Charles Greenlay	1,747	46.39
Progressive Conservative	William C. Warren	1,529	40.60
Votes Not Transferred		490	13.01

Rhineland:

Party	Candidate	Votes	%	±%
Liberal–Progressive	(incumbent)Wallace C. Miller	1,608	51.26	
Social Credit	Victor Peters	964	30.73	
Progressive Conservative	Leo A. Recksiedler	565	18.01	
Total valid votes		3,137	100.00	
Rejected votes		86		
Turnout		3,223	67.09	

Roblin:

Party	Candidate	Votes	%	±%
Liberal–Progressive	(incumbent)Ronald Robertson	1,474	50.26	
Co-operative Commonwealth Federation	Joseph Perchaluk	866	29.53	
Social Credit	Earl D. McIntyre	366	12.48	
Progressive Conservative	Fred E. Cowan	227	7.74	
Total valid votes		2,933	100.00	
Rejected votes		116		
Turnout		3,049	75.66	

Rockwood:

Party	Candidate	Votes	%	±%
Liberal–Progressive	(incumbent)Robert Bend	1,952	65.13	
Progressive Conservative	H.J. Langrell	656	21.89	
Social Credit	C.E. Toutant	389	12.98	
Total valid votes		2,997	100.00	
Rejected votes		47		
Turnout		3,044	71.34	

Russell:

First Count

Party	Candidate	Votes	%	±%
Liberal–Progressive	(incumbent)Rodney S. Clement	1,704	41.28	
Co-operative Commonwealth Federation	Michael Sotas	1,190	28.83	
Progressive Conservative	Keith Porter	723	17.51	
Social Credit	Charles H. Beswatherick	511	12.38	
Total valid votes		4,128	100.00	
Rejected votes		56		
Turnout		4,184	80.37	

Clement was subsequently elected on transfers.

St. Andrews:

Party	Candidate	Votes	%	±%
Liberal–Progressive	(incumbent)Thomas Hillhouse	2,938	57.14	
Progressive Conservative	Keith H. Robson	1,366	26.57	
Co-operative Commonwealth Federation	Ernest Draffin	838	16.30	
Total valid votes		5,142	100.00	
Rejected votes		93		
Turnout		5,235	65.08	

St. Clements:

Party	Candidate	Votes	%	±%
Liberal–Progressive	Stanley Copp	2,970	51.19	
Co-operative Commonwealth Federation	Edgar E. Smee	1,495	25.77	
Social Credit	Osborne A. Earle	959	16.53	
Progressive Conservative	Walter H. Whyte	378	6.51	
Total valid votes		5,802	100.00	
Rejected votes		259		
Turnout		6,061	60.66	

Fred Klym entered the contest as an Independent Liberal Progressive candidate, but withdrew before election day.

St. George:

Party	Candidate	Votes	%	±%
Liberal–Progressive	(incumbent)Christian Halldorson	1,695	84.08	
Social Credit	E.H. Hartfield	321	15.92	
Total valid votes		2,016	100.00	
Rejected votes		36		
Turnout		2,052	63.10	

Halldorson was also supported by the St. George Progressive Conservative Association.

Springfield:

First Count

Party	Candidate	Votes	%	±%
Liberal–Progressive	(incumbent)William Lucko	1,837	47.78	
Social Credit	William G. Storsley	1,365	35.50	
Progressive Conservative	A.H. Watt	643	16.72	
Total valid votes		3,845	100.00	
Rejected votes		215		
Turnout		4,060	51.68	

Watt was eliminated, and his votes were distributed as follows: Storsley 206, Lucko 128. 309 votes were not transferred.

Party	Candidate	Votes	%
Liberal–Progressive	(incumbent)William Lucko	1,965	51.11
Social Credit	William G. Storsley	1,571	40.86
Votes Not Transferred		309	8.04

Swan River:

First Count

Party	Candidate	Votes	%	±%
Progressive Conservative	(incumbent)George Renouf	2,383	49.32	
Social Credit	Delbert L. Downs	1,508	31.21	
Co-operative Commonwealth Federation	Sam Einarson	757	15.67	
Independent	George E. Scalf	184	3.81	
Total valid votes		4,832	100.00	
Rejected votes		64		
Turnout		4,896	65.00	

Renouf was subsequently elected on transfers.

The Pas:

Party	Candidate	Votes	%	±%
Liberal–Progressive	(incumbent)Francis Jobin	4,875	60.42	
Social Credit	William H. Calvert	1,668	20.67	
Co-operative Commonwealth Federation	Arthur W. Thompson	1,526	18.91	
Total valid votes		8,069	100.00	
Rejected votes		177		
Turnout		8,246	61.42	

Turtle Mountain:

Party	Candidate	Votes	%	±%
Progressive Conservative	(incumbent)Errick Willis	1,777	56.11	
Liberal–Progressive	Charles Gorrie	883	27.88	
Social Credit	C.A. Ferguson	507	16.01	
Total valid votes		3,167	100.00	
Rejected votes		57		
Turnout		3,224	78.61	

Virden:

Party	Candidate	Votes	%	±%
Progressive Conservative	John Thompson	2,182	57.38	
Liberal–Progressive	Gordon A. Mooney	1,621	42.62	
Total valid votes		3,803	100.00	
Rejected votes		31		
Turnout		3,834	75.40	

Eric Bailey was nominated for the Social Credit Party, but withdrew before election day. Herman Scheel was nominated in his place, but also withdrew after discovering that some electors who had signed his nomination papers believed they were endorsing Bailey.

=== Multi-member constituencies ===
==== St. Boniface ====
Two members elected

Valid votes in total = 19,557

Quota (amount that ensures election but not necessary to be elected) = 6,519

St. Boniface
Party	Candidate	FPv%	Count					
Party	Candidate	FPv%	1	2	3	4	5	6
Liberal–Progressive	Roger Teillet	23.16	4,530	4,607	4,687	4,923	5,087	6,220
Liberal–Progressive	L. Raymond Fennell	18.31	3,580	3,626	3,706	3,783	4,278	4,886
Liberal–Progressive	(incumbent)Joseph G. Van Belleghem	16.31	3,189	3,264	3,325	3,581	3,932	
Co-operative Commonwealth	David Turner	13.84	2,707	2,745	3,563	3,782	4,113	4,497
Progressive Conservative	Raymond Hughes	10.74	2,101	2,397	2,465	2,568		
Social Credit	Tony Lemoine	7.26	1,420	1,481	1,537			
Co-operative Commonwealth	Kay E. McKinnon	6.61	1,293	1,329				
Progressive Conservative	Louis Leger	3.77	737					
Electorate: 32,557 Valid: 19,557 Spoilt: 456 Quota: 6,519 Turnout: 20,013 (61.47%)

At the end there were 3954 exhausted votes, votes that were no longer in play, either because there were no back-up preferences marked or because the candidates that were marked had already been eliminated.

Two Liberal-Progressive candidates were declared elected when the field of candidates narrowed through eliminations of lowest-ranking candidates to the point where these two were the last remaining candidates to fill the two seats, which had still not been filled by that point. Being the last ones remaining, they were elected even though they did not have quota.

St. Boniface (analysis of transferred votes, ranked in order of 1st preference votes)
Party	Candidate	Maximum round	Maximum votes	Share in maximum round	Maximum votes First round votes Transfer votes
Liberal-Progressive	Roger Teillet	6	6,220	39.9%	
Liberal-Progressive	L. Raymond Fennell	6	4,886	31.3%	
Liberal-Progressive	Joseph G. Van Belleghem	5	3,932	22.5%	
Co-operative Commonwealth	David Turner	6	4,497	28.8%	
Progressive Conservative	Raymond Hughes	4	2,568	13.8%	
Social Credit	Tony Lemoine	3	1,537	8.0%	
Co-operative Commonwealth	Kay E. McKinnon	2	1,329	6.8%	
Progressive Conservative	Louis Leger	1	737	3.8%	
Exhausted votes			3,954	20.2%	

==== Winnipeg Centre ====
Winnipeg Centre
Party	Candidate	FPv%	Count									
Party	Candidate	FPv%	1	2	3	4	5	6	7	8	9	10
Co-operative Commonwealth	(incumbent)Donovan Swailes	19.01	3,910	3,921	3,929	3,950	4,204	4,204	4,204	4,204	4,204	4,204
Independent	Stephen Juba	17.59	3,619	3,668	3,689	3,783	3,826	3,894	3,992	4,172	4,172	4,172
Liberal–Progressive	Jack St. John	15.92	3,276	3,311	3,311	3,344	3,360	3,694	3,760	3,810	5,119	4,115
Progressive Conservative	Hank Scott	10.13	2,085	2,095	2,117	2,312	2,318	2,363	2,459	2,513	2,718	3,108
Independent	Lewis Stubbs	8.46	1,741	1,756	1,771	1,820	1,847	1,904	1,978	2,181	2,344	2,556
Liberal–Progressive	Nan Murphy	7.51	1,546	1,565	1,578	1,596	1,600	1,885	1,938	1,991		
Co-operative Commonwealth	(incumbent)Gordon R. Fines	5.25	1,080	1,085	1,094	1,095	1,246	1,265	1,339			
Liberal–Progressive	David Graham	4.04	831	848	857	873	879					
Social Credit	Percival Ward Brown	3.71	763	826	1,095	1,102	1,117	1,132				
Co-operative Commonwealth	G.S. Borgford	2.63	541	545	553	558						
Progressive Conservative	Joseph Stepnuk	2.32	478	488	489							
Social Credit	Emil A. Johnson	1.72	354	449								
Social Credit	Patrick J. Mulgrew	1.39	286									
Independent	E.L. Colson	0.31	63									
Electorate: 47,122 Valid: 20,573 Spoilt: 406 Quota: 4,115 Turnout: 20,979 (44.52%)

The surpluses of Swailes and Juba were not transferred, as they were too small to affect the final candidate order. Scott was declared elected to the fourth position, despite finishing below the quota.

Winnipeg Centre (analysis of transferred votes, ranked in order of 1st preference votes)
Party	Candidate	Maximum round	Maximum votes	Share in maximum round	Maximum votes First round votes Transfer votes
Co-operative Commonwealth	Donovan Swailes	10	4,204	23.16%	
Independent	Stephen Juba	10	4,172	22.98%	
Liberal-Progressive	Jack St. John	9	5,119	27.58%	
Progressive Conservative	Hank Scott	10	3,108	17.12%	
Independent	Lewis Stubbs	10	2,556	14.08%	
Liberal-Progressive	Nan Murphy	8	1,991	10.55%	
Co-operative Commonwealth	Gordon R. Fines	7	1,339	6.81%	
Liberal-Progressive	David Graham	5	879	4.31%	
Social Credit	Percival Ward Brown	6	1,132	5.57%	
Co-operative Commonwealth	G.S. Borgford	4	558	2.73%	
Progressive Conservative	Joseph Stepnuk	3	489	2.39%	
Social Credit	Emil A. Johnson	2	449	2.19%	
Social Credit	Patrick J. Mulgrew	1	286	1.39%	
Independent	E.L. Colson	1	63	0.31%	
Exhausted votes			2418	11.75%	

==== Winnipeg North ====
Winnipeg North
Party	Candidate	FPv%	Count							
Party	Candidate	FPv%	1	2	3	4	5	6	7	8
Co-operative Commonwealth	(incumbent)Morris Gray	21.48	4,642	4,323	4,323	4,323	4,323	4,323	4,323	4,323
Labor–Progressive	(incumbent)Bill Kardash	17.64	3,812	3,830	3,872	3,903	3,949	4,102	4,212	4,271
Co-operative Commonwealth	(incumbent)John Hawryluk	13.27	2,857	2,946	3,165	3,207	3,974	4,218	4,793	4,323
Liberal–Progressive	John M. Kozoriz	8.62	1,863	1,866	1,939	2,370	2,397	2,581	2,879	3,082
Progressive Conservative	Stan Carrick	8.31	1,795	1,804	1,940	2,004	2,076	2,373		
Liberal–Progressive	E.A. Brotman	7.74	1,672	1,780	1,838	1,969	2,042			
Liberal–Progressive	Alexander Turk	7.50	1,622	1,629	1,712	2,124	2,164	2,603	3,068	3,134
Liberal–Progressive	John J. Kelsch	5.43	1,173	1,176	1,282					
Co-operative Commonwealth	Len Aylen	5.19	1,122	1,192	1,293	1,325				
Social Credit	Nicholas Hallas	4.24	917	928						
Independent	John Zuzyk	0.64	138	139						
Electorate: 44,887 Valid: 21,613 Spoilt: 503 Quota: 4,323 Turnout: 22,116 (49.27%)

Kardash and Turk were declared elected to the third and fourth positions, even though both finished below the quota. Because of vote transfers from Lib-Prog Brotman and from Prog-Conservative Carrick, Lib-Prog Turk passed Lib-Prog Kozoriz who was in fourth place to take a seat.

2480 exhausted votes at the end.

Winnipeg North (analysis of transferred votes, ranked in order of 1st preference votes)
Party	Candidate	Maximum round	Maximum votes	Share in maximum round	Maximum votes First round votes Transfer votes
Co-operative Commonwealth	Morris Gray	1	4,642	21.48%	
Labor-Progressive	Bill Kardash	8	4,271	22.98%	
Co-operative Commonwealth	John Hawryluk	7	4,793	22.32%	
Liberal-Progressive	John M. Kozoriz	8	3,082	16.11%	
Progressive Conservative	Stan Carrick	6	2,373	11.75%	
Liberal-Progressive	E.A. Brotman	5	2,042	9.76%	
Liberal-Progressive	Alexander Turk	8	3,134	16.38%	
Liberal-Progressive	John J. Kelsch	3	1,282	6.00%	
Co-operative Commonwealth	Len Aylen	4	1,325	6.24%	
Social Credit	Nicholas Hallas	2	928	4.29%	
Independent	John Zuzyk	2	139	0.64%	
Exhausted votes			2,480	11.47%	

==== Winnipeg South ====
Winnipeg South
Party	Candidate	FPv%	Count						
Party	Candidate	FPv%	1	2	3	4	5	6	7
Liberal–Progressive	(incumbent)Ronald Turner	27.49	8,007	5,826					
Progressive Conservative	(incumbent)Dufferin Roblin	20.75	6,045	6,045	5,826				
Co-operative Commonwealth	(incumbent)Lloyd Stinson	16.94	4,934	5,030	5,042	5,067	5,281	5,972	5,972
Progressive Conservative	Gurney Evans	14.49	4,221	4,557	4,699	4,716	4,829	4,949	6,197
Progressive Conservative	Maude McCreery	6.25	1,820	2,041	2,090	2,110	2,241	2,318	
Liberal–Progressive	George P. Macleod	6.20	1,806	3,243	3,254	3,273	3,349	3,460	3,889
Co-operative Commonwealth	A. Montague Israels	3.83	1,117	1,165	1,167	1,175	1,234		
Social Credit	Doreen Benjamin	2.10	612	629	630	1,068			
Social Credit	Jemima F. Webster	1.94	566	592	594				
Electorate: 56,065 Valid: 29,128 Spoilt: 319 Quota: 5,826 Turnout: 29,447 (52.52%)

Stinson's surplus of 146 was not transferred, as it would not have affected the candidate order.

Winnipeg South (analysis of transferred votes, ranked in order of 1st preference votes)
Party	Candidate	Maximum round	Maximum votes	Share in maximum round	Maximum votes First round votes Transfer votes
Liberal-Progressive	Ronald Turner	1	8,007	27.49%	
Progressive Conservative	Dufferin Roblin	1	6,045	20.75%	
Co-operative Commonwealth	Lloyd Stinson	6	5,972	21.06%	
Progressive Conservative	Gurney Evans	7	6,197	25.08%	
Progressive Conservative	Maude McCreery	6	2,318	8.18%	
Liberal-Progressive	George P. Macleod	7	3,889	15.74%	
Co-operative Commonwealth	A. Montague Israels	5	1,234	4.32%	
Social Credit	Doreen Benjamin	4	1,068	4.29%	
Social Credit	Jemima F. Webster	3	594	2.04%	
Exhausted votes			1,418	5.12%	

=== Deferred elections ===
The election in Rupertsland was deferred to July 6, due to the difficulties of enumeration in this vast northern constituency. The election in Ste. Rose was also deferred to July 6, after incumbent Liberal-Progressive candidate Maurice Dane MacCarthy died on the eve of the general election.

The election did not technically end until July 21, 1953, when the final results for Rupertsland were announced.

Rupertsland (deferred to July 6, 1953):

First Count

Party	Candidate	Votes	%	±%
Liberal–Progressive	Roy Brown	1,136	49.31	
Liberal–Progressive	Harry Boulette	982	42.62	
Independent	Charles Leo Abbott	186	8.07	
Total valid votes		2,304	100.00	
Rejected votes		92		
Turnout		2,396	57.10	

The Progressive Conservatives initially nominated E.G. Perry, but he withdrew from the contest and endorsed Brown. Brown was declared elected following transfers from Abbott. The official Elections Manitoba report of this constituency lists Boulette as an official Liberal-Progressive candidate, but newspaper reports from the period indicate that he was an Independent Liberal-Progressive.

Ste. Rose:

First Count

Party	Candidate	Votes	%	±%
Liberal–Progressive	Gildas Molgat	1,369	40.95	
Liberal–Progressive	James Albert Fletcher	1,083	32.40	
Social Credit	Antoine Pineau	891	26.65	
Total valid votes		3,343	100.00	
Rejected votes		76		
Turnout		3,419	69.32	

Pineau was eliminated, and his votes were transferred as follows: Molgat 192, Fletcher 83. 616 votes were not transferred.

Second Count

Party	Candidate	Votes	%
Liberal–Progressive	Gildas Molgat	1,561	46.69
Liberal–Progressive	James Albert Fletcher	1,166	34.88
Votes Not Transferred		616	18.43

== Sources ==
Results for the first ballot counts for all constituencies are taken from the 1954 Canadian Parliamentary Guide, and from Election Manitoba's "Historical Summaries" (printed as an appendix to the 2003 election results).

There are minor discrepancies between these sources for the Social Credit vote count in Brandon City, Manitou-Morden, Rockwood and Swan River. The sources also disagree as to the candidate order for Minnedosa on the first count (although both agree that Gilbert Hutton was subsequently elected). In each case, the "Historical Summaries" entry has been taken as more reliable.

All results after the first ballot are taken from reports in the Winnipeg Free Press. This paper made an obvious error in reporting Lloyd Stinson's fifth-vote count, which has been corrected here. Other than this, the results for multi-member constituencies may be taken as accurate and verifiable. For the single-member constituencies, it possible that Free Press reports differed from the final results in some particulars.

== Post-election changes ==
Ivan Schultz (Mountain, LP) resigned his seat in the first half of 1955, while James O. Argue (Deloraine-Glenwood, PC) died in the same period. By-elections for both constituencies were held on June 27, 1955. The CCF concluded that it did not have a chance of victory in either seat, and declined to nominate candidates. Social Credit also planned to stay out of the elections, until Roger Poiron entered the Mountain poll without consulting the provincial party. Although not technically an official candidate, he still received support from the Social Credit organization.

Manitoba provincial by-election, June 27, 1955: Deloraine—Glenwood
Party	Candidate	Votes	%	±%
Progressive Conservative	Albert Draper	2,056	59.89	+6.01
Liberal–Progressive	Robert E. Moffat	1,377	40.11	−6.01
Total valid votes		3,433	100	

Manitoba provincial by-election, June 27, 1955: Mountain
Party	Candidate	Votes	%	±%
Liberal–Progressive	Walter Clark	1,846	51.04	−7.83
Progressive Conservative	Marcel Boulic	1,570	43.41	
Social Credit	Roger Poiron	201	5.56	
Total valid votes		3,617		

The Winnipeg Free Press's coverage indicates that the Campbell government was concerned with the results of the 1955 by-elections. Mountain had previously been regarded as one of the safest Liberal-Progressive seats in the province, and Boulic's performance was unexpectedly strong. Many leading government figures had campaigned for Clark in the campaign's final days, to ensure his victory. Clark received most of his support from Mountain's Anglophone majority and large Flemish community, while Boulic did well among French Canadians, who made up about one third of the voters.

St. George (dec. Christian Halldorson, 1956), December 30, 1956:

- Elman Guttormson (LP) 1214
- Magnusson (PC) 707
- Allen (CCF) 510

Emerson (res. John Solomon, 1957), November 14, 1957:

- John Tanchak (LP) 2183
- Frank Casper (PC) 2008

[Note: These figures are taken from the Winnipeg Free Press, with 31 of 32 polls reporting. The outstanding poll was too small to affect the final result.]

Manitou-Morden (dec. Hugh Morrison, 1957), November 14, 1957:

- Maurice Ridley (PC) 2240
- David Lumgair (L) 1057

Gladstone (dec. William Morton, early 1958)

Dauphin (William Bullmore left the Social Credit party in either 1957 or 1958)

Arthur (dec. J. Arthur Ross, April 1, 1958)
