= 1959 Manitoba general election =

- May 14, 1959

57 seats of the Legislative Assembly of Manitoba 29 seats were needed for a majority
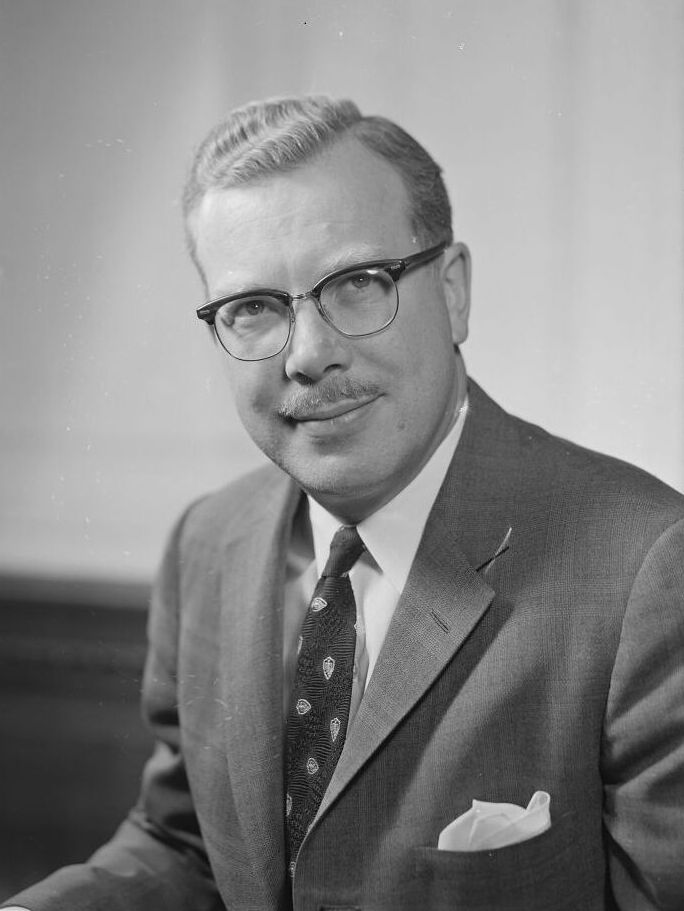
	First party	Second party	Third party
			CCF
Leader	Duff Roblin	Douglas Campbell	Lloyd Stinson
Party	Progressive Conservative	Liberal–Progressive	Co-operative Commonwealth
Leader since	June 17, 1954	November 13, 1948	December 19, 1952
Leader's seat	Wolseley	Lakeside	Osborne (lost re-election)
Last election	26	19	11
Seats won	36	11	10
Seat change	▲10	▼8	▼1
Popular vote	147,140	94,799	68,149
Percentage	47.0%	30.3%	21.8%
Swing	▲6.4pp	▼4.4pp	▲1.8pp
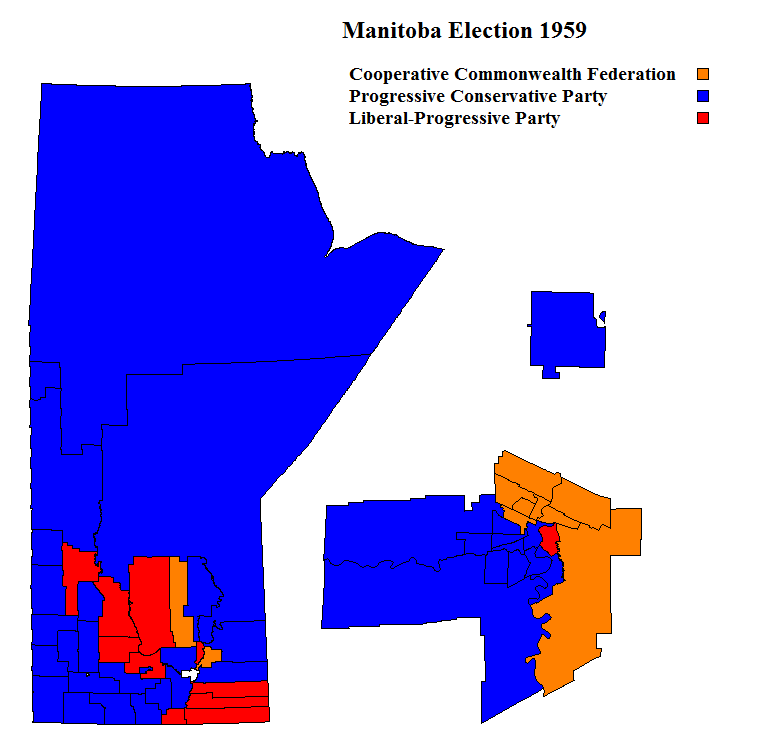
- Map of Election Results
Premier before election
Dufferin Roblin
Progressive Conservative
Premier after the election
Dufferin Roblin
Progressive Conservative

The 1959 Manitoba general election was held on May 14, 1959 to elect 57 members to the Legislative Assembly of Manitoba, Canada. It resulted in a majority victory for the incumbent Progressive Conservatives under the leadership of Premier Dufferin Roblin. It was the first time since the 1914 election that the PCs won an outright majority in the province, when they were led by Dufferin Roblin's grandfather, Sir Rodmond Roblin.

Roblin's PCs won 36 seats against 11 for the Liberal-Progressives, led by former Premier Douglas Campbell, and 10 for the social democratic Co-operative Commonwealth Federation led by Lloyd Stinson. The PCs took 25 per cent more votes than it had received in the previous election just one year before but took 40 per cent more seats than it had won in 1958. They had won 117,822 votes in 1958, compared to 147,000 in 1959.

The Manitoba Social Credit Party, which won 2 seats in the 1958 election, did not contest any seats during the election and regained a foothold in the legislature only during a subsequent by-election. The communist Labor-Progressive Party contested three ridings but did not win any.

The election is the last one to be fought by candidates with the "Liberal-Progressive," "Co-operative Commonwealth," or "Labor-Progressive" labels in Manitoba. The Liberal-Progressives dropped the latter half in 1961 and ran all subsequent elections as "Liberals." Similarly, the Labor-Progressive candidates returned to the "Communist" label. The CCF changed its name following the national party's re-incorporation into the New Democratic Party and ran all future elections as Manitoba New Democrats.

== Detailed Results ==
=== Summary ===
Party	Party leader	# of candidates	Seats		Popular vote		
Party	Party leader	# of candidates	1958	Elected	#	%	% Change
Progressive Conservative	Dufferin Roblin	57	26	36	147,140	47.0%	
Liberal-Progressive	Douglas Campbell	57	19	11	94,799	30.3%	
Co-operative Commonwealth	Lloyd Stinson	45	11	10	68,149	21.8%	
Labor–Progressive	William Cecil Ross	3	-	-	1,731	0.6%	
Independent		3	1	-	1,171	0.4%	
Total		165	57	57	312,990	100%	

Popular vote
PC	47.01%
Liberal-Progressive	30.29%
CCF	21.77%
Others	0.93%

Seats summary
PC	63.16%
Liberal-Progressive	19.30%
CCF	17.54%

=== Northern Manitoba ===
Electoral district	Candidates				Incumbent
Electoral district	PC	Liberal-Progressive	CCF	Other	Incumbent
Churchill	John Ingebrigtson; 1,587	Kenneth D. Wray; 954			E.J. Williams
Flin Flon	Charles Witney; 1,810	Francis Jobin; 1,728	Frederick S. Pope; 923		Francis Jobin
Rupertsland	Joseph Jeannotte; 2,268	Harry Boulette; 587	Alfred J. Cook; 393		Joseph Jeannotte
The Pas	John Carroll; 2,345	Marvin Hill; 1,027	Peter Schewchuk; 779		John Carroll

=== Southern Manitoba ===
Electoral district	Candidates				Incumbent
Electoral district	PC	Liberal-Progressive	CCF	Other	Incumbent
Arthur	John Cobb; 2,513	John McRae; 1,932		William G. Powne (Ind.); 556	John Cobb
Birtle-Russell	Robert Smellie; 2,239	Rodney Clement; 2,015	Michael Sotas; 947		Rodney Clement
Brandon	Reginald Lissaman; 5,452	Gordon A. Phillips; 2,159	Hans Fries; 1,415		Reginald Lissaman
Brokenhead	Gordon B. Burnett; 1,409	Arthur Trapp; 1,083	Ed Schreyer; 2,107		Ed Schreyer
Carillon	Peter J. Thiessen; 1,791	Edmond Prefontaine; 2,397			Edmond Prefontaine
Cypress	Marcel Boulic; 2,951	John Leslie Sundell; 1,781			Marcel Boulic
Dauphin	Stewart McLean; 2,951	Emma Hildegard Ringstrom; 967	A. Clifford Matthews; 1,233		Stewart McLean
Dufferin	William Homer Hamilton; 2,077	Walter McDonald; 1,923	Chester Ernest Johnson; 167		Walter McDonald
Emerson	Ben Comeaux; 2,190	John Tanchak; 2,752			John Tanchak
Ethelbert Plains	Isadore Syrnyk; 1,001	Michael Hryhorczuk; 1,856	Peter Burtniak; 1,590		Michael Hryhorczuk
Fisher	Roy Ellison; 1,361	W.J. Griffin, Jr. 1,028	Peter Wagner; 1,777		Peter Wagner
Gimli	George Johnson; 2,570	Alex Hawrysh; 1,007	Zado Zator; 932		George Johnson
Gladstone	Earl Murray; 2,318	Nelson Shoemaker; 2,469	Della Yuel; 415		Nelson Shoemaker
Hamiota	Barry Strickland; 2,377	James Chester Scott; 2,136	Arthur Nicholson; 440		Barry Strickland
Lac du Bonnet	Oscar Bjornson; 1,357	John Ateah; 1,272	Donald H. MacLean; 1,018	Stanley Copp (Ind.); 346	Arthur Trapp
Lakeside	John Frederick Bate; 1,774	Douglas Campbell; 1,896	Allen Werbiski; 278		Douglas Campbell
La Verendrye	Edmund Guertin; 1,581	Stan Roberts; 1,799			Stan Roberts
Minnedosa	Walter Weir; 2,386	Charles L. Shuttleworth; 2,029	J.M. Lee; 1,090		Charles L. Shuttleworth
Morris	Harry Shewman; 1,905	Bruce MacKenzie; 1,298			Harry Shewman
Pembina	Maurice Ridley; 3,077	Lynwood Graham; 1,199			Maurice Ridley
Portage la Prairie	John Christianson; 2,300	Charles Greenlay; 1,827	Fred Allan Tufford; 416		Charles Greenlay
Rhineland	Leo Recksiedler; 1,462	Wallace C. Miller; 1,648			Wallace C. Miller
Roblin	Keith Alexander; 1,946	Ray Mitchell; 1,334	Joseph Perchaluk; 1,569		Keith Alexander
Rock Lake	Abram Harrison; 2,545	Walter Clark; 1,843	Cyril Hamwee; 632		Abram Harrison
Rockwood-Iberville	George Hutton; 2,269	Robert Bend; 2,143	Samuel Cranston; 444		Robert Bend
St. George	Ivan George Casselman; 1,371	Elman Guttormson; 2,279	Nellie Baker; 255		Elman Guttormson
Ste. Rose	Albert Fletcher; 1,576	Gildas Molgat; 2,390	Leon W. Hoefer; 353		Gildas Molgat
Selkirk	Edward Foster; 1,732	Thomas P. Hillhouse; 1,814	Scottie Bryce; 872		Thomas P. Hillhouse
Souris-Lansdowne	Malcolm McKellar; 2,688	George Adrian Griffith; 1,448			Malcolm McKellar
Springfield	Fred Klym; 1,878	William Lucko; 1,507	Richard Loeb; 772		William Lucko
Swan River	Albert H.C. Corbett; 2,292	Arvid Burst; 786	Hilliard Farriss; 1,431		Albert H.C. Corbett
Turtle Mountain	Errick Willis; 3,247	Walter Christianson; 1,187			Errick Willis
Virden	John Thompson; 3,097	John Wesley Clarke; 1,337			John Thompson

=== Winnipeg ===
Electoral district	Candidates				Incumbent
Electoral district	PC	Liberal-Progressive	CCF	Other	Incumbent
Assiniboia	George Johnson; 3,157	Jack Brownrigg; 1,388	Donovan Swailes; 2,940	George R.A. Brown (Ind.); 269	Donovan Swailes
Burrows	Andrew Zaharychuk; 1,286	Joseph R. Hnidan; 1,155	John Hawryluk; 2,235	William Cecil Ross (LPP); 675	John Hawryluk
Elmwood	Henry Emerson Snyder; 2,560	Alex Turk; 1,488	Steve Peters; 2,782		Steve Peters
Fort Garry	Sterling Lyon; 4,842	Stanley Farwell; 2,035	Nena Woodward; 1,373		Sterling Lyon
Fort Rouge	Gurney Evans; 4,352	Jerome Marrin; 1,947	Robert C. Murdoch; 1,425		Gurney Evans
Inkster	Mary A. Wawrykow; 2,106	John A. Kolt; 981	Morris Gray; 3,635	L.W. Kaminski (LPP); 468	Morris Gray
Kildonan	John Ernest Willis; 3,511	Cornelius Huebert; 1,972	A.J. Reid; 3,659		A.J. Reid
Logan	Albert Edward Bennett; 1,921	John Kozoriz; 873	Lemuel Harris; 2,098		Stephen Juba
Osborne	Obie Baizley; 3,808	David Bowman; 1,166	Lloyd Stinson; 3,482		Lloyd Stinson
Radisson	Harold Huppe; 2,998	Nick Slotek; 2,029	Russell Paulley; 4,085		Russell Paulley
River Heights	W.B. Scarth; 4,936	Keith Routley; 3,060	Magnus Eliason; 478		W.B. Scarth
St. Boniface	Harry De Leeuw; 2,992	Laurent Desjardins; 3,772	Benjamin Cyr; 1,309		Roger Teillet
St. James	Douglas Stanes; 3,616	David Graham; 1,541	Al Mackling; 2,348		Douglas Stanes
St. Johns	Dan Zaharia; 2,010	Abe Yanofsky; 854	David Orlikow; 2,261	Jacob Penner (LPP); 588	David Orkilow
St. Matthews	William Martin; 3,635	Paul Goodman; 1,900	Gordon Fines; 2,090		William Martin
St. Vital	Fred Groves; 4,599	George R. D. Goulet; 1,946	Joseph Trafer; 353		Fred Groves
Seven Oaks	Charles Nye; 1,973	Calvin Scarfe; 1,343	Arthur E. Wright; 3,889		Arthur E. Wright
Wellington	Richard Seaborn; 3,082	William Norrie; 1,624	James McIsaac; 2,854		Richard Seaborn
Winnipeg Centre	James Cowan; 3,712	Gurzon Harvey; 1,462	Fred Paulley; 1,474		James Cowan
Wolseley	Dufferin Roblin; 4,351	Francis C. Muldoon; 1,707	Peter Griffin; 1,131		Dufferin Roblin

=== By-elections 1958 to 1962 ===
Manitoba provincial by-election, November 26, 1959: Arthur Death of John Cobb
Party	Candidate	Votes	%	±%
Progressive Conservative	J. Douglas Watt	2,036	50.96	+0.71
Liberal–Progressive	E. Harry Patmore	1,959	49.04	+10.41
Total valid votes		3,995	100	
Progressive Conservative hold		Swing		−4.85

Manitoba provincial by-election, November 26, 1959: Cypress Death of Marcel Boulic
Party	Candidate	Votes	%	±%
Progressive Conservative	Thelma Forbes	2,378	58.98	-3.38
Liberal–Progressive	John Sundell	1,654	41.02	+3.38
Total valid votes		4,032	100	
Progressive Conservative hold		Swing		−3.38

Manitoba provincial by-election, November 26, 1959: Rhineland Death of Wallace C. Miller
Party	Candidate	Votes	%	±%
Social Credit	Jacob Froese	1,300	36.27	+36.27
Progressive Conservative	Leo Recksiedler	1,209	33.73	-13.28
Liberal–Progressive	David K. Friesen	1,075	29.99	-23.00
Total valid votes		3,584	100	
Social Credit gain from Liberal–Progressive		Swing		+29.64

Manitoba provincial by-election, November 26, 1959: Turtle Mountain Appointment of Errick Willis to position of Lieutenant Governor of Manitoba
Party	Candidate	Votes	%	±%
Liberal–Progressive	Edward Dow	2,380	51.14	+24.37
Progressive Conservative	Robert C. Aitkens	2,274	48.86	-24.37
Total valid votes		4,654	100	
Liberal–Progressive gain from Progressive Conservative		Swing		+24.37

Manitoba provincial by-election, December 9, 1960: Pembina Death of Maurice Ridley
Party	Candidate	Votes	%	±%
Progressive Conservative	Carolyne Morrison	2,132	43.21	-28.75
Liberal–Progressive	Charles Cousins	1,491	30.22	+2.18
Social Credit	Bruce Wannop	1,311	26.57	+26.57
Total valid votes		4,934	100	
Progressive Conservative hold		Swing		−26.57

== See also ==
- List of Manitoba political parties
