= Hank Scott =

Canadian politician

Henry Baird Scott (December 21, 1898 – September 21, 1972) was a politician in Manitoba, Canada. He served in the Legislative Assembly of Manitoba from 1953 to 1958, as a member of the Progressive Conservative Party.

Scott was born in Winnipeg, the son of Thomas A. Scott and Lydia Baird. He owned a bakery business, and was a city councillor in Winnipeg before entering provincial politics.

Scott first sought election to the Manitoba legislature in the 1949 provincial election, in the four-member constituency of Winnipeg South. During this period, Manitoba's provincial elections were determined by a single transferable ballot. Although he finished third on the first ballot, he fell behind in subsequent transfers and narrowly missed election, losing to Liberal-Progressive Paul Bardal by 200 votes on the final ballot. He was more fortunate in the 1953 election, defeating independent candidate Lewis Stubbs by over 500 votes to win the fourth position.

Scott left the Progressive Conservative Party prior to the 1958 provincial election, in which Winnipeg's multi-member ridings were replaced by single-seat constituencies. He ran for re-election in St. Matthews as an independent Conservative, but finished a poor fourth with only 260 votes. The winner was Progressive Conservative William G. Martin, who received 2,848 votes.

Scott appears to have been a difficult member of the Progressive Conservative caucus before leaving the party. When discussing Scott in private conversation, Conservative leader Dufferin Roblin is said to have asked CCF leader Lloyd Stinson, "Got anyone you'd like to trade?".

After leaving politics, he served on the municipal and public utility board and then the Manitoba Censor Board until 1970. Scott moved to Calgary, Alberta in 1971, dying there the following year.
