= Elman Guttormson =

Canadian politician (1929-2000)

Elman Kreisler Guttormson (March 24, 1929 in Lundar, Manitoba – October 10, 2000) was a politician in Manitoba, Canada. He was a Liberal member of the Legislative Assembly of Manitoba from 1956 to 1969.

The son of John Guttormson and Sigridur Johnson, Guttormson was educated at Lundar and United College. He worked for the Winnipeg Free Press newspaper as a reporter, covering fields as diverse as crime and horse racing. He won a national newspaper award in 1962, while serving as a member of the legislature. In 1952, he married Hildur Thorsteinson.

He was first elected to the legislature in a by-election on December 30, 1956 in the mid-northern constituency of St. George, defeating his Progressive Conservative and CCF opponents by a comfortable margin. He served as a backbench supporter of Douglas Campbell's government for the next year and a half.

The Liberals were defeated provincially in the 1958 election, although Guttormson won his own seat by a wider margin than before. He was also re-elected without difficulty in the elections of 1959, 1962 and 1966. Guttormson also served as party whip.

The Liberals lost much of their support base in the 1969 election, and Guttormson lost his seat to Bill Uruski of the New Democratic Party by 398 votes. He sought a political comeback in the 1973 election, but lost to Uruski by an increased margin.

Guttormson supported the federal and provincial Liberal parties for his entire adult life. One of his daughters married Bob Axworthy, a relative of Lloyd Axworthy.

Guttormson, later in his career, became a newspaper editor, retiring in 1993. He died in Winnipeg at the age of 71 following a long illness.
