= William Martin (Canadian politician) =

Canadian politician

William G. Martin

Member of the Legislative Assembly of Manitoba
- In office 1958–1966
- Preceded by: Hank Scott
- Succeeded by: Robert Steen
- Constituency: St. Matthews

Ontario MPP
- In office 1926–1934
- Preceded by: New riding
- Succeeded by: Morrison Mann MacBride
- Constituency: Brantford

Personal details
- Born: September 13, 1886 Milton Abbot, Devonshire, England
- Died: December 19, 1973 (aged 87) Brantford, Ontario
- Party: Conservative
- Occupation: Minister

William George Martin (September 13, 1886 – December 19, 1973) was a Canadian clergyman and politician. Martin represented Brantford in the Legislative Assembly of Ontario from 1926 to 1934 as a Conservative member and St. Matthews as a Progressive Conservative member of the Legislative Assembly of Manitoba from 1958 to 1966.

== Background ==
He was born in Milton Abbot, Devonshire, England, the son of William Martin, and came to Canada in 1910, settling in Calgary, Alberta. He was ordained a minister of the Congregational Church there. He returned to England in 1912 promoting immigration on behalf of the Canadian government. On his return to Canada, he received a degree in theology from Victoria College in Toronto, Ontario. He served as an assistant minister for the Methodist Church in Hamilton and then was a chaplain overseas during World War I. He returned to serve with the Congregational Church in Brantford. In 1935, Martin was historian for the Canadian expedition to the Eastern Arctic.

== Politics ==
In 1926, he was elected to the Ontario provincial assembly as a member of the Ontario Conservative Party for the constituency of Brantford. He served as the Minister of Welfare and Minister of Public Works from 1930 to 1934. In 1936, Martin became minister at a United Church in Winnipeg, serving there until 1955.

He was elected to the Manitoba legislature in the 1958 provincial election, defeating CCF candidate Gordon Fines by over 800 votes in the Winnipeg constituency of St. Matthews. (Incumbent Hank Scott placed a distant fourth, running as an independent Conservative.) Martin defeated Fines again in the 1959 election, and was returned a third time in the 1962 campaign. He was a backbench supporter of Dufferin Roblin's government throughout his time in office and also served four years as deputy speaker for the assembly.
