= Ronald Turner (politician) =

Canadian politician (1915–1965)

Ronald David Turner, QC (August 19, 1915 in Carman, Manitoba – 1965) was a politician in Manitoba, Canada. He served in the Legislative Assembly of Manitoba from 1946 to 1956, and was a cabinet minister in the government of Douglas Campbell.

Turner was educated at the University of Manitoba and the Manitoba Law School. He practiced as a barrister-at-law, and became a Queen's Counsel in 1955.

During World War II, Turner served in the Royal Canadian Air Force from 1939 to 1945. In 1946, he was elected to the Manitoba legislature as a special representative of Manitobans serving overseas in the RCAF. Although elected as an independent, he soon joined the caucus of the governing Liberal-Progressive Party.

He was re-elected in the 1949 provincial election, winning the third position in the four-member constituency of Winnipeg South. On December 1, 1951, he was appointed to cabinet in the senior position of Provincial Treasurer.

Turner was again re-elected in the 1953 provincial election, topping the poll in Winnipeg South. He was by this time the leading cabinet representative from Winnipeg, and received the additional portfolio of Railway Commissioner on January 18, 1954.

Turner was known as a skilled politician, and was described by CCF leader Lloyd Stinson as "undoubtedly the brightest front bench performer in the latter days of the Campbell regime". He was known as both a civil liberal and a fiscal conservative. Just prior to the 1953 provincial election, he summarizing his political philosophy with the following statement: "The government is of the belief that the cost of government should be held to the minimum commensurate with the provision of a satisfactory level of essential services."

While a conservative and cautious administrator in most respects, Turner played a leading role in establishing the Manitoba Hydro-electric Board in 1953, at a cost of $54,600,000. The Hydro-Electric Board later became one of the most powerful public agencies in Canada.

Many believed Turner would eventually replace Campbell as leader of the Liberal-Progressive Party, but this did not occur. He resigned from cabinet on July 6, 1956 to become president of Transair, an airline based in Winnipeg. He remained in the legislature as a backbencher, but did not seek re-election in 1958. As a backbencher, he opposed the CCF's plan for comprehensive social security.

Turner's friends expected that he would eventually return to politics, either as provincial Liberal leader or as a Member of Parliament for the federal Liberal Party. His early death in 1965 came as a surprise to those who knew him.
