= Gordon Fines =

Canadian politician (1911-1990)

Gordon Richard Fines (November 11, 1911 in Darlingford, Manitoba – July 29, 1990) was a politician in Manitoba, Canada. He served in the Legislative Assembly of Manitoba from 1949 to 1953, as a member of the social-democratic Cooperative Commonwealth Federation.

Fines was the son of Richard Fines and Mabel Willcott, who had resided in Manitoba since 1876, shortly after the province's creation. He was educated in Baldur, and worked as an educator in Manitoba and Saskatchewan for eight years. He was elected to the Winnipeg school board in 1947, and to the Winnipeg city council in 1948. Fines also worked for the Canadian Pacific Railway, became active in the labour movement, and was local chair of the Brotherhood of Railway Clerks Lodge 49. He returned to teaching later in life.

He was married twice: first to Santa Maria La Monica in 1942 and later to Marion Cove Morden.

He was elected to the Manitoba legislature in the 1949 provincial election, in the constituency of Winnipeg Centre. During this period's Winnipeg was divided into three constituencies, each of which elected four members through a single transferable ballot. Fines finished fourth on the first count with 2,149 votes, and was declared elected to the third position on the seventh count when another CCF member was eliminated.

He was chosen as party whip on December 22, 1952, at the same meeting which saw Lloyd Stinson chosen as party leader. Stinson later described Fines as "a quiet man with firm opinions and a flair for statistics and fiscal matters". He was the CCF's main spokesperson in budget debates.

Fines sought re-election to the legislature in the 1953 election, but was defeated. He finished seventh on the first count with 1,080 votes, and was eliminated on the seventh count. The independent candidates of Lewis Stubbs and Stephen Juba likely contributed to Fines's defeat.

After his provincial defeat, Fines ran for the federal Cooperative Commonwealth Federation in the 1953 Canadian election, in the single-member riding of Winnipeg South Centre. He finished third, with about half the votes of Progressive Conservative Gordon Churchill. He ran again in the 1958 election, but finished a poor third.

Winnipeg's electoral map was redrawn before the 1958 provincial election, with the multi-member constituencies eliminated and "first past the post" single-member constituencies introduced in their place. Fines ran for the CCF in the St. Matthew's constituency, but lost to Progressive Conservative William G. Martin by 822 votes. He lost to Martin by 545 votes in the 1959 election, and finished third as a candidate of the New Democratic Party (successor to the CCF) in the 1962 campaign.

Fines had greater success in municipal politics. He was elected to the Winnipeg City Council for Ward Two in the 1953 municipal election. He served on council from 1953 to 1960, and again from 1966 to 1971. In 1969, he was chosen as the head of Winnipeg's Parks and Recreation Committee.

He died in Winnipeg at the age of 78.
