= John Cobb (Canadian politician) =

Canadian politician

John Gordon Cobb (January 18, 1903 – August 20, 1959) was a politician in Manitoba, Canada. He served in the Legislative Assembly of Manitoba from 1958 to 1959, as a member of the Progressive Conservative Party.

The son of William John Cobb and Mary Elizabeth Lloyd, he was born in Melita, Manitoba, was educated there and went on to attend agricultural college. He worked in banks for a number of years before being hired at a garage in Melita. In 1953, he opened his own garage with his brother in Melita, later adding a service station and restaurant. Cobb served on the town council and was mayor of Melita for six years.

Cobb was first elected to the Manitoba legislature in the 1958 provincial election, defeating Liberal-Progressive candidate John McRae by forty votes in the rural, southwestern riding of Arthur. He was re-elected in the 1959 election, defeated McCrae by a greater margin.

Cobb was a backbench supporter of Dufferin Roblin's government during his time in the legislature. He died in Melita three months and seven days after the 1959 campaign.
