= Ray Mitchell =

Canadian politician

Raymond Mitchell (October 6, 1897, in Gilbert Plains, Manitoba – June 15, 1984) was a politician in Manitoba, Canada. He served in the Legislative Assembly of Manitoba as a Liberal-Progressive from 1949 to 1958.

Mitchell was educated at Grandview, Manitoba and worked as a farmer and rancher. He served on the Board of Grain Commissioners of Canada, as a reeve for Grandview and was president of the Union of Manitoba Municipalities.

He first campaigned for the Manitoba legislature in the 1941 provincial election, but lost to Stanley Fox of the Social Credit League by over 600 votes in the Gilbert Plains constituency. Both Mitchell and Fox were supporters of the coalition government led by Premier John Bracken. Mitchell defeated Fox for the coalition nomination in the 1949 provincial election, and went on to defeat CCF candidate Jacob Schulz by 330 votes on election day.

Mitchell was re-elected in the 1953 election, defeating CCF candidate Robert J. Wilson. He served as a backbench supporter of Douglas Campbell's government during his time in the legislature.

In the 1958 election, he lost to Keith Alexander of the Progressive Conservative Party by 198 votes in the redistributed constituency of Roblin. He attempted a political comeback in the 1959 election, but finished third in the riding.

Mitchell served as mayor for Grandview from 1972 to 1974.
