= L. Raymond Fennell =

Canadian politician

Leslie Raymond Fennell (December 27, 1893 in Roland, Manitoba – August 29, 1986 in Port Hope, Ontario) was a politician in Manitoba, Canada. He served in the Legislative Assembly of Manitoba as a Liberal-Progressive from 1953 to 1958.

The son of S. E. Fennell and Beatrice May DeLong, he was educated in Roland. He served in World War I, and subsequently worked as a cash grain broker. In 1922, Fennell married Mary Marjorie Douglas; they had daughters Beatrice Carolyn, Nancy Lois, and Leslie Roberta Fennell. He was a member of the Board of Governors of the Winnipeg Grain Exchange, and was mayor of Fort Garry, then a suburban municipality independent of Winnipeg, from 1946 to 1953.

He was elected to the Manitoba legislature in the 1953 provincial election in the constituency of St. Boniface. This was a two-member constituency at the time, and Fennell defeated Cooperative Commonwealth Federation candidate David Turner for the second seat. He served as a backbench supporter of Douglas Campbell's government during his time in the legislature.

The Liberal-Progressives lost to the Progressive Conservatives in the 1958 election, and Fennell lost to future Premier of Manitoba Sterling Lyon by 1,323 votes in the redistributed constituency of Fort Garry. He returned to municipal politics and served as mayor of Fort Garry again from 1960 to 1967.

In 1973, Fennell moved to Port Hope, Ontario. He later died there at the age of 92.
