= John R. Pitt =

Canadian politician

John Robertson Pitt (July 1, 1885 in Carluke, Ontario – 1970) was a politician in Manitoba, Canada. He served in the Legislative Assembly of Manitoba as a Liberal-Progressive from 1935 to 1958.

The son of James Pitt and Mary D. King, both natives of Edinburgh, Scotland, Pitt was educated in Oneida. He first came to Manitoba as a seasonal farm worker in 1901 and returned to the Pierson district two years later. He was a general hardware merchant and funeral director. In 1913, he married Isabelle Hardy. Pitt chaired the Pierson School Board from 1918 to 1930.

He was first elected to the Manitoba legislature in a by-election held on June 24, 1935. The previous member had died in the Arthur constituency, in the province's southwestern corner, and Pitt was elected by acclamation to take his place. In the 1936, he defeated Conservative candidate J. Arthur Ross by 309 votes to retain the constituency.

Pitt was returned by acclamation in the 1941 election, and defeated a candidate of the CCF in the 1945 election. He was returned a final time in 1949, over two opponents. He served as a government backbencher throughout his time in the legislature, in the ministries of John Bracken, Stuart Garson and Douglas Campbell.

Pitt lost his seat to J. Arthur Ross in the 1953 provincial election, by 480 votes. Ross had served as a member of the House of Commons of Canada since 1936, and had an expanded profile in the constituency.
