= Thelma Forbes =

Canadian politician (1910–2012)

19th Speaker of the Legislative Assembly of Manitoba
- In office February 28, 1963 – December 5, 1966
- Preceded by: Nicholas Bachynsky
- Succeeded by: James Bilton

Member of the Legislative Assembly of Manitoba for Cypress
- In office November 26, 1959 – June 25, 1969
- Preceded by: Marcel Boulic
- Succeeded by: None - riding abolished

Personal details
- Born: September 26, 1910 Manitou, Manitoba
- Died: January 5, 2012 (aged 101) Port Coquitlam, British Columbia
- Party: Progressive Conservative
- Occupation: Service Station operator, farmer
- Profession: Teacher

Thelma Bessie Forbes (September 26, 1910 – January 5, 2012) was a politician in Manitoba, Canada. She was a Progressive Conservative member of the Legislative Assembly of Manitoba from 1959 to 1969, and served as a cabinet minister in the governments of Dufferin Roblin and Walter Weir. Forbes was the third woman ever elected to serve in the Manitoba legislature, the first woman to serve as speaker for the legislature and the first to serve in cabinet.

The daughter of Robert A. J. Brown and Annie Sheehan, she was born on a farm near Manitou, Manitoba, was educated at Manitou Collegiate and the Manitou Normal School, going on to teach school in south central Manitoba. In 1940, she married Edgar Forbes. They operated an Imperial Oil service station and an International Harvester dealership in Rathwell. From 1954 until the 1970s, they operated a farm in the same area. In 1978, the couple moved to Treherne. She was a member of the Winnipeg Business and Professional Club.

Forbes was first elected to the Manitoba legislature in a by-election held on November 26, 1959, defeating Liberal-Progressive candidate John Sundell by 724 votes in the riding of Cypress. She was re-elected by roughly the same majority in the 1962 provincial election, and by a slightly reduced figure in the 1966. She did not seek re-election in 1969, following the abolition of her riding.

Forbes was appointed Speaker of the Manitoba Legislature on February 28, 1963, and served in that position until December 5, 1966. Although considered a more successful Speaker than her predecessor, she is said not to have enjoyed the non-partisan position. She was later named Minister of Urban Development and Minister of Municipal Affairs on July 22, 1966, and held that position until September 24, 1968, when she was named Minister of Public Works. She served in the latter capacity until the 1969 election.

After the death of her husband in 1982, Forbes moved to Port Coquitlam, British Columbia, and died at the Burquitlam Lions Care Centre in Coquitlam on January 5, 2012.
