= Jimmy Creighton =

- Born: November 18, 1905 Brandon, Manitoba, Canada
- Died: May 29, 1990 (aged 84)
- Height: 5 ft 9 in (175 cm)
- Weight: 150 lb (68 kg; 10 st 10 lb)
- Position: Left wing
- Shot: Left
- Played for: Detroit Falcons
- Playing career: 1926–1933

James Albert Creighton (November 18, 1905 – May 29, 1990) was an ice hockey player and politician from Brandon, Manitoba.

Creighton played eleven games in the National Hockey League with the Detroit Falcons in 1931, scoring one goal and receiving one minor penalty. He was traded to the New York Americans in December 1931, but never played for the team. He later worked in the IHL and the Can-Am Leagues. Creighton became a professional hockey referee after retiring as a player, and later worked as a general insurance salesman.

He served as an alderman in Brandon in 1946, 1948 and 1949, and was mayor of the city from 1952 to 1955 and from 1958 to 1961.

Creighton won the Liberal-Progressive nomination for Brandon City in the 1953 provincial election, defeating W.A. Wood and J.C. MacDonald at a contested meeting. He lost to Progressive Conservative candidate Reginald Lissaman in the general election, receiving 3,063 votes (40.13%) on the first count and losing on the second. Provincial elections in Manitoba were conducted by the single transferable ballot in this period.

Later in the same year, Creighton ran for the House of Commons of Canada in the 1953 federal election as a Liberal candidate in Brandon—Souris. He received 8,456 votes, and finished second to Progressive Conservative Walter Dinsdale. He ran for the Manitoba legislature a second time in the 1962, and lost to Lissaman again.

He suffered from Parkinson's disease in his later years, and was eventually confined to a nursing home prior to his death in 1990.

== Career statistics ==
=== Regular season and playoffs ===
			Regular season					Playoffs
Season	Team	League	GP	G	A	Pts	PIM	GP	G	A	Pts	PIM
1924–25	University of Manitoba	WJrHL	—	—	—	—	—	—	—	—	—	—
1924–25	University of Manitoba	Mem-Cup	—	—	—	—	—	2	1	1	2	10
1925–26	Melville Millionaires	S-SJHL	14	15	2	17	6	—	—	—	—	—
1926–27	Brandon Wheat Kings	MHL	7	6	2	8	12	2	0	0	0	8
1927–28	Brandon Wheat Kings	MHL	16	11	3	14	29	—	—	—	—	—
1928–29	Port Arthur Ports	TBSHL	19	13	9	22	40	2	1	0	1	2
1928–29	Port Arthur Ports	Al-Cup	—	—	—	—	—	7	9	3	12	9
1929–30	Detroit Olympics	IHL	23	10	8	18	24	—	—	—	—	—
1930–31	Detroit Falcons	NHL	11	1	0	1	2	—	—	—	—	—
1930–31	Detroit Olympics	IHL	5	0	0	0	8	—	—	—	—	—
1931–32	Detroit Olympics	IHL	3	0	0	0	0	—	—	—	—	—
1931–32	Philadelphia Arrows	Can-Am	5	2	0	2	15	—	—	—	—	—
1931–32	Boston Cubs	Can-Am	4	1	0	1	4	—	—	—	—	—
1932–33	Kansas City Pla-Mors	AHA	10	1	3	4	9	—	—	—	—	—
1932–33	Duluth Hornets/Wichita Blue Jays	AHA	1	0	0	0	2	—	—	—	—	—
NHL totals			11	1	0	1	2	—	—	—	—	—
