= Christian Halldorson =

Canadian politician (1891–1956)

- Born: February 27, 1891; Lundar, Manitoba
- Died: September 18, 1956 (aged 65); Winnipeg
- Occupation: Politician

Christian Halldorson (February 27, 1891 – September 18, 1956) was a politician in Manitoba, Canada. He served in the Legislative Assembly of Manitoba as a Liberal-Progressive from 1945 until his death.

Halldorson's parents emigrated from Iceland to Canada four years before his birth. Born in Lundar, Manitoba, Halldorson was educated at the Manitoba Agricultural College, and worked as an insurance agent. During World War I, he served with the 107th Battalion C.E.F. and 3rd Canadian Engineers from February 1915 to May 9, 1919, and was stationed in France from 1917 to 1919. In 1920, he married Lauga Eyolfson. They moved to Ericksdale in 1934 where Halldorson was an insurance agent and also operated a garage. He later was owner and operator of a bus line that ran between Gypsumville and Winnipeg.

He was first elected to the Manitoba legislature in the 1945 provincial election, defeating Eric Stefanson by 258 votes in the St. George constituency. He was re-elected by acclamation in the 1949 election, and easily defeated a Social Credit opponent in 1953. He died three years later, while still a member of the legislature.

Unlike most Liberal-Progressive backbenchers, Halldorson supported the CCF's proposals for pension reform in 1955.

He died in office in Winnipeg at the age of 65.

His sister Salome also served in the provincial assembly 1936-1941.
