= Albert Draper =

Canadian politician

Albert Earl Draper (December 13, 1895 – November 3, 1963) was a politician in Manitoba, Canada. He served in the Legislative Assembly of Manitoba as a Progressive Conservative from 1955 to 1958.

The son of William Draper and Jane Stanley, Draper was born in St. Mary's, Ontario, and became a farmer in Elgin, Manitoba. He served from 1915 to 1918 in France during World War I, and achieved the rank of Sgt. Major. His older son, Clarence Oscar Draper, was killed in action during World War II.

Draper was elected to the Manitoba legislature in a by-election held on June 27, 1955, defeating Liberal-Progressive candidate Robert E. Moffat by almost 700 votes in the constituency of Deloraine-Glenwood. He did not seek re-election in the 1958 provincial election, in which the Progressive Conservatives won a minority government.

He died in Winnipeg at the age of 67.
