= Abram Harrison =

Canadian politician (1898–1979)

Abram William Harrison

18th Speaker of the Legislative Assembly of Manitoba
- In office October 23, 1958 – February 27, 1963
- Preceded by: Nicholas Bachynsky
- Succeeded by: Thelma Forbes

Member of the Legislative Assembly of Manitoba for Killarney
- In office June 22, 1943 – May 15, 1966
- Preceded by: John Laughlin
- Succeeded by: riding abolished

Personal details
- Born: July 15, 1898 Holmfield, Manitoba
- Died: November 14, 1979 (aged 81) Holmfield, Manitoba
- Party: Progressive Conservative

Abram William Harrison (July 15, 1898– November 14, 1979) was a politician in Manitoba, Canada. He was a member of the Legislative Assembly of Manitoba from 1943 to 1966, initially as a Conservative and later as a Progressive Conservative, after the party changed its name. He served as a cabinet minister in the government of Dufferin Roblin.

== Early life and education ==
Harrison was born on July 15, 1898 in Holmfield, Manitoba The son of William S. Harrison and Maria Wilkinson, Harrison was educated in Holmfield, and was the manager of Harrison Milling and Grain Co. before entering politics. He was also a member of the Killarney Lodge. In 1937, he married Amelia Sutherland.

== Career ==
He was first elected to the Manitoba legislature in a by-election on July 22, 1943, in the constituency of Killarney. The Liberal-Progressives and Conservatives governed Manitoba in a grand coalition during this period, and Harrison served as a backbench supporter of Stuart Garson's ministry.

Notwithstanding the coalition, some Liberal-Progressives ran against Progressive Conservative incumbents in the 1945 provincial election. Harrison narrowly fended off a challenge from LP candidate G.M. Harrison, winning by only 150 votes on the second count of a preferential ballot. He was re-elected again in the 1949 election, easily defeating an anti-coalition maverick from the Liberal-Progressives.

The Progressive Conservatives left the coalition government in 1950. Harrison moved to the opposition benches, and was re-elected in the 1953 election. He appears to have supported Errick Willis against a leadership challenge from Dufferin Roblin in 1954.

The Progressive Conservative Party formed a minority government under Dufferin Roblin following the 1958 election. Harrison defeated Liberal-Progressive candidate Walter E. Clark by 238 votes in the redistributed constituency of Rock Lake, and was appointed by Roblin as Speaker of the Manitoba legislature on October 23, 1958. The opposition Liberals opposed Harrison's appointment, on the grounds that Roblin should have consulted with opposition leaders before making his selection. He was nonetheless confirmed, and was regarded as a good if unspectacular office-holder.

Harrison defeated Clark a second time in the 1959 election, and was retained in the Speaker's chair. Harrison defeated Liberal candidate Harry Parsonage by 429 votes in the 1962 election. He was replaced as Speaker on February 27, 1963, and formally entered Roblin's government as a minister without portfolio. He retained this position until May 15, 1966, and did not contest the 1966 election.

== Death and legacy ==
He died at home in Holmfield at the age of 81. His grandson, Scott Newman, was the Liberal Party candidate for Radisson at the 2016 Manitoba provincial elections. His son Bill Harrison ran the Harrison Milling Company until its closure in the late 1990's.
