= Marcel Boulic =

Canadian politician

Marcel Boulic (January 15, 1916 – September 22, 1959) was a politician in Manitoba, Canada. He served in the Legislative Assembly of Manitoba as a Progressive Conservative from 1958 to 1959, and was a cabinet minister in the government of Dufferin Roblin.

== Early life and career ==
Boulic born at Altamont, Manitoba, and was educated at St. Boniface College. He was elected as a school trustee in 1940, and served in this position for three years. He was later a councillor, and then the reeve of Notre-Dame-de-Lourdes. Boulic was initially a farmer in private life, and later operated a creamery.

== 1955 by-election ==
Boulic first for the Manitoba legislature in a by-election held on June 27, 1955. He agreed to run as the Progressive Conservative candidate in Mountain after meeting with Dufferin Roblin, who had been chosen as the party's leader the previous year. Roblin has said of their first meeting that Boulic struck him as "a man in his forties, open-faced, well set-up, of diffident manner, but clearly a leader", adding "[h]is politics were in doubt but I got know him just the same. When the by-election came, I had my man".

On election day, Boulic lost to Liberal-Progressive candidate Walter Clark by 276 votes. Notwithstanding his defeat, Boulic's showing was considered both impressive and significant. Mountain had been considered one of the safest Liberal-Progressive seats in the province, and the Conservatives had not even fielded a candidate in the division since 1932. Several prominent Liberal-Progressives campaigned on Clark's behalf, and senior party members were reported as being concerned with the close result. Roblin wrote that Boulic, in defeat, "[laid] the foundations for victory in 1958".

Newspaper reports indicate that Clark's support came largely from Mountain's Anglo-Saxon majority and significant Flemish community, while Boulic did well among French Canadians, who made up about one-third of the electorate.

== Legislator ==
Boulic was elected to the Manitoba legislature in the 1958 provincial election, defeating incumbent Liberal-Progressive Samuel Burch by 512 votes in the redistributed constituency of Cypress. The Progressive Conservatives under Roblin won a minority government in this election, and Boulic was appointed as Provincial Secretary on June 30, 1958. He was the only Franco-Manitoban in Roblin's cabinet.

He was re-elected in the 1959 provincial election with an increased majority. The Progressive Conservatives won a majority government in this cycle, and Boulic retained his cabinet position.

Boulic died of a heart attack a few months after the election, at his home in St. Boniface. The Winnipeg Free Press wrote that his death "remove[d] from public life in Manitoba one of its most personable young men," describing Boulic as having wide knowledge of municipal affairs, a "contagious French Canadian sense of humour" and "rich personal charm." The paper added that he had not served long enough as Provincial Secretary to make a strong impact in the position.

At the time of Boulic's death, Dufferin Roblin described him as a "pillar of the cabinet and a very dear personal friend." He later paid him the following tribute in his memoirs:

[Boulic was] first and foremost a Franco-Manitoban, with that solid Norman temperament we often see in the province. His transition from rural reeve to provincial cabinet minister was difficult for him because it brought him into an entirely new circle of activity, both in government and indeed in city life. He was making a very good fist of things when unfortunately he died of a heart attack on September 22, 1959. [...] This was a blow from which I never recovered because never again was I able to have Franco-Manitoban representation in cabinet.

== Electoral record ==
1959 Manitoba general election: Cypress
Party	Candidate	Votes	%	±%
Progressive Conservative	Marcel Boulic	2,951	62.36	+10.24
Liberal–Progressive	John Leslie Sundell	1,781	37.64	−3.11
Total valid votes		4,732		
Rejected votes		27		
Turnout		4,759	72.77	+4.64
Electors on the lists		6,540		

1958 Manitoba general election: Cypress
Party	Candidate	Votes	%	±%
Progressive Conservative	Marcel Boulic	2,347	52.12	
Liberal–Progressive	Samuel Burch	1,835	40.75	
Co-operative Commonwealth	G.H. McIntosh	321	7.13	
Total valid votes		4,503		
Rejected votes		19		
Turnout		4,522	68.13	
Electors on the lists		6,637		

Manitoba provincial by-election, June 27, 1955: Mountain
Party	Candidate	Votes	%	±%
Liberal–Progressive	Walter Clark	1,846	51.04	−7.83
Progressive Conservative	Marcel Boulic	1,570	43.41	
Social Credit	Roger Poiron	201	5.56	
Total valid votes		3,617		
