= Ronald Robertson (politician) =

Canadian politician

Ronald Douglas Robertson (born August 22, 1920 in Roblin, Manitoba – March 27, 1998) was a politician in Manitoba, Canada. He served in the Legislative Assembly of Manitoba from 1945 to 1958, and was the Minister for Agriculture in the government of Douglas Campbell.

Robertson was educated at the University of Manitoba and the Manitoba Law School. He also worked as a farmer, and was the president of the University Liberal Club in his youth. Robertson served as chair of the Motor Vehicle Control Board, and was a member of the Cabinet Civil Defence Committee and the Industrial Relations Committee.

Robertson enlisted with the Royal Canadian Air Force in 1940, and was discharged in September 1945 with the rank of Flight Lieutenant. He was also awarded the American Air Medal and Bar.

He was first elected to the Manitoba legislature in the 1945 provincial election. At the time, Manitoba was governed by an alliance of Liberal-Progressives and Progressive Conservatives. Robertson ran as an independent candidate supporting the coalition government, and defeated CCF candidate Leslie Thompson by 155 votes in the Roblin constituency. He was re-elected by a greater margin in the 1949 election, and joined the Liberal-Progressive Party in the parliament that followed.

On November 7, 1952, Robertson was appointed Minister of Agriculture in Douglas Campbell's government. He was easily returned in the 1953 election, and was appointed Minister of Public Works on July 6, 1956.

The Liberal-Progressives were defeated in the 1958 election, and Robertson lost his own legislative seat in the redistributed constituency of Swan River, finishing third against Progressive Conservative candidate Albert H.C. Corbett.
