= Michael Hryhorczuk =

Canadian politician (1905-1978)

Michael Nicholas Hryhorczuk (November 28, 1905 in Gilbert Plains, Manitoba – July 11, 1978) was a politician in Manitoba, Canada. He served as a member of the Legislative Assembly of Manitoba from 1949 to 1966, and was a cabinet minister in the government of Douglas Campbell. Hryhorczuk was originally a Liberal-Progressive, and later became a Liberal after the party changed its name. His father, Nicholas Hryhorczuk, was also a member of the Legislative Assembly from 1920 to 1945.

Hryhorczuk was educated at the University of Manitoba and the University of Saskatchewan, receiving Bachelor of Arts and law degrees. He worked as a barrister before entering political life, and served as chairman of the Ethelbert School Board and president of the Ethelbert Chamber of Commerce. He also served as reeve of Ethelbert for a time.

He was first elected to the Manitoba legislature in the 1949 provincial election, defeating CCF candidate Fred Zaplitny by over 700 votes in his father's old riding of Ethelbert. He served as a backbench supporter of Campbell's government in the parliament which followed, and was re-elected without difficulty in the 1953 election.

On January 25, 1955, Hryhorczuk was named as the province's Attorney General. He retained this position until the 1958 provincial election, in which Campbell's Liberal-Progressive lost power to Dufferin Roblin's Progressive Conservatives. He formally resigned his position on June 30, 1958.

Hryhorczuk himself was re-elected in the 1958 provincial election, defeating future MLA Peter Burtniak of the CCF by almost 1,000 votes in the redistributed riding of Ethelbert Plains. He defeated Burtniak by a narrower margin in the 1959 election, and was returned again in the 1962 campaign. He did not run in 1966.

Former CCF leader Lloyd Stinson once described Hryhorczuk as "[a]n extremely likable and friendly fellow ... surprisingly conservative, almost reactionary in his political philosophy, which made him an idea candidate for promotion to the Campbell cabinet." (Stinson, Political Warriors, p. 129). He opposed humanitarian prison reforms during his time as Attorney General, and had little enthusiasm for the idea of rehabilitation.

Hryhorczuk died in Ethelbert in 1978, one year before his father.
