= William Lucko =

Canadian politician (1911–1998)

William Lucko (January 11, 1911 – October 5, 1998) was a politician in Manitoba, Canada. He served in the Legislative Assembly of Manitoba as a Liberal-Progressive from 1949 to 1959.

Born in Hazelridge, Manitoba to Nick Lucko and Pearl Mozel, Ukrainian-Canadian parents, Lucko worked as a general merchant in Hazelglen. He served as the community's school secretary and postmaster. In 1938, he married Anne Nimchuk.

He was first elected to the Manitoba legislature in the provincial election of 1949, winning an easy victory in the constituency of Springfield. He was re-elected in the 1953 election, and served as a backbench supporter of Douglas Campbell's government.

The Liberal-Progressives lost power in the 1958 provincial election, although Lucko was re-elected by 82 votes over his Progressive Conservative opponent, Oscar Russell. In the 1959 election, he lost his seat to Progressive Conservative Fred Klym by 371 votes.

Lucko attempted to return to the legislature in the provincial elections of 1962 and 1966, but lost to Fred Klym on both occasions. In 1966, he fell to a third-place finish.

He died in Winnipeg at the age of 87.
