= William Bullmore =

Canadian politician (1912-1972)

William Lewis Bullmore (October 10, 1912 in Minnedosa, Manitoba – August 23, 1972) was a politician in Manitoba, Canada. He served in the Legislative Assembly of Manitoba from 1953 to 1958, initially as a Social Credit representative and later as an independent.

The son of Adrian Henry Bullmore and Annie Andrew, Bullmore was educated in Minnedosa, and worked as a manufacturer. He was the president of Dauphin Products Ltd. and also established the Bullmore Funeral Home. He married Arla Maynes, from Harrowby, Manitoba, on August 11, 1936 and they had two children, who were named James William Bullmore and Arla Anne Bullmore Porter. He served in Dauphin as a Councillor from 1944 to 1945, and was the town's mayor from 1946 to 1955. He was the first president of the Manitoba Urban League. Bullmore was also an active freemason, and was involved with several masonic organizations.

Bullmore's decision to run for the Social Credit Party was a surprise to many political observers, as he had been encouraged by some members of the Liberal Party to run federally under their banner. In his nomination speech, he acknowledged that some of his friends had warned him against running for Social Credit, suggesting it would be "political suicide".

He was elected to the Manitoba legislature in the 1953 election, defeating Liberal-Progressive candidate John Potoski by 174 votes in the Dauphin constituency. Incumbent Progressive Conservative Ernest N. McGirr finished third.

Bullmore was one of only two Social Credit MLAs to serve in Manitoba's 1953-58 parliament. According to the Winnipeg Free Press, his early speeches in the legislature were focused on issues of monetary reform. He left the Social Credit Party in 1956 over contributions to the Social Credit Party from the Manitoba breweries. He did not seek re-election in the 1958 provincial election.

Bullmore moved to Winnipeg in 1958 and died there at the age of 59 following a lengthy illness.
