= James O. Argue =

Canadian politician

James Oswald Argue (September 12, 1888 in Elgin, Manitoba – March 6, 1955) was a politician in the Canadian province of Manitoba. He served in the Legislative Assembly of Manitoba as a Progressive Conservative from 1945 until his death ten years later. Argue's father, James H. Argue, was also a Member of the Legislative Assembly from 1898 to 1914.

Argue was educated at Wesley College, Winnipeg. He worked as a farmer at Elgin, Manitoba and was active in freemasonry. He was married twice: first to Christina Yuill in 1911 and then to Josephine Riley in 1943.

He was first elected to the Manitoba legislature in the 1945 provincial election, winning by acclamation in the Deloraine constituency after his only opponent withdrew from the race. He was again returned by acclamation in the 1949 election, for the redistributed riding of Deloraine-Glenwood.

From 1940 to 1950, Manitoba was governed by an alliance of Liberal-Progressives and Progressive Conservatives. When the Progressive Conservatives left the coalition in 1950, Argue chose to sit as an independent Progressive Conservative.

He later rejoined the Progressive Conservative Party, and defeated Liberal-Progressive R.E. Moffat by 268 votes in the 1953 provincial election. He was still a member of the legislature when he died two years later.
