= Thomas P. Hillhouse =

Canadian politician

Thomas Paterson Hillhouse, QC (June 25, 1896 in Glasgow, Scotland – October 27, 1991) was a politician in Manitoba, Canada. He was a member of the Legislative Assembly of Manitoba from 1950 to 1969, initially serving as a Liberal-Progressive and subsequently as a Liberal, after the party changed its name.

The son of James W. Hillhouse and Mary Brown, Hillhouse came to Winnipeg with his family in 1900 and was educated there, at the University of Manitoba and at the Manitoba Law School. He served in Europe with the Canadian Expeditionary Force during World War I. He was called to the Manitoba bar in 1923 and worked as a barrister-at-law in Selkirk. Hillhouse served as a police magistrate for the province. In 1927, he married Irene McGregor. He was later named Queen's Counsel.

He was first elected to the Manitoba legislature in a by-election on October 10, 1950. Hillhouse defeated his CCF and Progressive Conservative opponents fairly easily in the riding of St. Andrews, and served as a backbench supporter of Douglas Campbell's government. He was re-elected in the 1953 election. Notwithstanding their name, the Liberal-Progressives were considered the most right-wing party in Manitoba during this period; Hillhouse, however, was seen as a leading social liberal in the party's caucus. Some expressed surprise that he was never named to cabinet.

The Liberal-Progressives lost power following the 1958 provincial election, and Hillhouse was returned by a reduced majority in the redistributed riding of Selkirk.

He defeated PC candidate Edward Foster by only 82 votes in the 1959 election, in which the Progressive Conservatives won a majority government. He won by a greater majority in the 1962 election, but defeated PC candidate Sydney Sarbitt by only 40 votes in that of 1966. He retired from the legislature in 1969.

He died in Selkirk at the age of 95.
