= Samuel Burch =

Canadian politician (1889–1974)

Samuel Edward Burch (August 1, 1889 – March 4, 1974) was a politician in Manitoba, Canada. He served in the Legislative Assembly of Manitoba as a Liberal-Progressive from 1949 to 1958.

The son of L. R. Burch and Jane Ann McRae, Burch was born in Carberry and educated at Brucefield School in Manitoba. He was first elected to the Manitoba legislature in the 1949 election in the constituency of Norfolk—Beautiful Plains, defeating his Progressive Conservative opponent by 633 votes. He was re-elected by a greater margin in the 1953 provincial election. Burch served as a backbench supporter of Douglas Campbell's government during his time in the legislature.

He was married twice: first to Agnes Mabel Mann in 1912 and then to Lavina Jane Campbell in 1934.

The Liberal-Progressives were defeated in the 1958 election, and Burch was defeated by Progressive Conservative candidate Marcel Boulic in the redistributed constituency of Cypress.
