= Francis Ferg =

Canadian politician (1889–1960)

Francis Milton Ferg (May 10, 1889 in Arden, Manitoba – March 11, 1960) was a politician in Manitoba, Canada. He served in the Legislative Assembly of Manitoba as a Liberal-Progressive from 1953 to 1958.

The son of William Daniel Ferg and Agnes Ogston, Ferg was educated at Manitoba University and the Manitoba Law School, was called to the Manitoba bar in 1919 and worked as a barrister-at-law. He was a captain in the Royal Canadian Army Service Corps (RCASC) in 1918, the final year of World War I, and a member of the Royal Canadian Legion. In 1923, he married Helen Fleming Paterson. Ferg was named a King's Counsel in 1949.

He was elected to the Manitoba legislature in the 1953 provincial election, defeating opponents from the Progressive Conservative Party and Social Credit League in the rural constituency of Cypress. At his nomination speech, Ferg spoke out in favour of the Canadian wheat board and against the liberalization of Manitoba's liquor laws. He served as a backbench supporter of Douglas Campbell's government, and did not run for re-election in 1958.

He became mayor of Glenboro in 1959 and died in Winnipeg the following year at the age of 70.

Two of his sons, Lorne Paterson and Patrick David, also became lawyers and both later became county court judges.
