= James Anderson (Manitoba politician) =

Canadian politician

James Frederick Anderson (September 2, 1903 – October 18, 1983) was a politician in Manitoba, Canada. He served in the Legislative Assembly of Manitoba from 1948 to 1958 as a Liberal-Progressive.

The son of William V. Anderson and Harriet Ellen Whitmore, Anderson was born in Oakville, Manitoba and was educated there and at the University of Manitoba. He went on to study law, practising in Winnipeg until 1942, when he moved to Ashern. Anderson was administrator for the Rural Municipality of Woodlea from 1942 to 1948. He also served as a school board trustee, as a member of the Ashern Hospital Board and as president of the Manitoba Hospital Organization.

Anderson was first elected to the legislature in a by-election on December 23, 1948, defeating CCF opponent Michael Taczynski in the Fairford constituency. The by-election was called after former premier Stuart Garson resigned to run for a seat in the House of Commons of Canada.

Anderson was returned by acclamation in the 1949 election, and was re-elected without difficulty in the 1953 election. He was a backbench supporter of Douglas Campbell's government during his time in the legislature, and did not seek re-election in 1958.

He died in Ashern at the age of 80.
