= Norfolk—Beautiful Plains =

Defunct provincial electoral district in Manitoba, Canada

Norfolk—Beautiful Plains is a former provincial electoral district in Manitoba, Canada. It was created for the 1949 provincial election by a merger of the Norfolk and Beautiful Plains constituencies, and eliminated with the 1958 provincial election. It was held by Liberal-Progressive Samuel Burch throughout its history.

== Members of the Legislative Assembly ==
Name	Party	Took office	Left office
Samuel Burch	Liberal–Progressive	1949	1958

== See also ==
- List of Manitoba provincial electoral districts
- Canadian provincial electoral districts
