= John McDowell (Manitoba politician) =

Canadian politician

Member of the Legislative Assembly of Manitoba for Iberville
- In office 1945–1958
- Preceded by: Arthur Boivin
- Succeeded by: Vacant

Personal details
- Born: September 16, 1894 Greenock, Inverclyde, Scotland
- Died: June 10, 1980 (aged 85) Winnipeg, Manitoba, Canada
- Party: PC

John McDowell (September 16, 1894 – June 10, 1980) was a British-born Canadian merchant and politician in Manitoba. He served in the Legislative Assembly of Manitoba as a Progressive Conservative from 1945 to 1958.

== Early life and education ==
The son of John McDowell and Janet Shaw, McDowell was born in Greenock, Inverclyde, Scotland and immigrated to Canada with his family in 1895. He was educated in Toronto, Ontario.

== Career ==
McDowell worked as a grain dealer, and was president of McDowell Grain Co. Ltd and Ridgewood Development Co. Ltd. He was also on the board of governors of the Winnipeg Grain Exchange.

=== Manitoba Assembly ===
He was first elected to the Manitoba legislature in the 1945 provincial election, in the constituency of Iberville. At the time, Manitoba was governed by a coalition ministry of Liberal-Progressives and Progressive Conservatives. McDowell ran as an Independent Progressive Conservative supporting the coalition, and defeated Liberal-Progressive W.D. Lawrence by over 400 votes.

He resigned his seat in 1949 to run for the House of Commons of Canada as a Progressive Conservative. He finished third in the riding of Selkirk in the federal election of 1949, behind William Bryce of the social-democratic Cooperative Commonwealth Federation and Liberal Laurier Regnier.

No by-election was called for Iberville, and the seat remained vacant until the 1949 provincial election, held several months after the federal campaign. McDowell ran to succeed himself, and won re-election as an Independent Progressive Conservative opposing the coalition.

In 1949, McDowell and George Hastings formed the Manitoba Democratic Movement as a pressure group within the Progressive Conservative Party. Not a formal political party, the MDM called for the Progressive Conservatives to leave the coalition government and supplant the CCF as the province's primary opposition. Hastings was concerned that the CCF could form the government if no other alternatives were presented to the electorate.

Following pressure from the MDM and other groups, the Progressive Conservatives left the coalition in 1950, and McDowell rejoined the official party caucus in opposition. He was re-elected in the 1953 provincial election, defeating Liberal-Progressive C.H. Jarvis by 195 votes.

McDowell was on the right wing of the Progressive Conservatives. Proud of his position on the grain commission, he opposed the Canadian Wheat Board as unwarranted government interference in the marketplace. During a 1953 legislative debate on the issue, he made the following statement: "Why, if Communism ever came to this county – and I pray God it won't – they won't have to change a thing in this act, only the penalties. Instead, you'll be shot in the morning, that's all!".

He was a forceful debater, and once described the CCF as "a demoralized race, fighting with the wind, soon to be gone with the wind".

McDowell was a supporter of Errick Willis in the party's 1954 leadership convention, and opposed Dufferin Roblin's leadership of the Manitoba Progressive Conservative Party. When Roblin's government enacted progressive legislation in 1958, McDowell dismissed the party as the "Progressive Conservative Commonwealth Federation". McDowell himself declined to be a candidate in the 1958 election.

He came out of political retirement to run in the federal election of 1968, opposing Roblin as an Independent Conservative in Winnipeg South Centre. He received 632 votes.

== Death ==
McDowell died at the King George Hospital in Manitoba in 1980.
