= Ethelbert (electoral district) =

Defunct provincial electoral district in Manitoba, Canada

Ethelbert is a former provincial electoral district in Manitoba, Canada. It was created for the 1920 provincial election, and abolished with the 1958 election.

Ethelbert was located in Manitoba's mid-northern region, north of Dauphin. It included a large Ukrainian population, and all four of the provincial representatives who were elected for this constituency were of Ukrainian descent. Nicholas Hryhorczuk held Ethelbert for all but five years between 1920 and 1945, and his son Michael N. Hryhorczuk represented it from 1949 until its dissolution. For most of its existence, elections there were deferred until a few weeks after the rest of the province voted due to the logistical difficulty of running a campaign in the north.

After its elimination, parts of Ethelbert came to be included in the new division of Ethelbert Plains.

== Members of the Legislative Assembly ==
Name	Party	Took office	Left office
Nicholas Hryhorczuk	Independent Farmer	1920	1922
	Progressive	1922	1932
	Liberal–Progressive	1932	1936
William Lisowsky	Social Credit	1936	1941
Nicholas Hryhorczuk	Liberal–Progressive	1941	1945
Michael Sawchuk	Cooperative Commonwealth Federation	1945	1949
Michael N. Hryhorczuk	Liberal–Progressive	1949	1958

== See also ==
- List of Manitoba provincial electoral districts
- Canadian provincial electoral districts
