= Co-operative Commonwealth Federation (Manitoba) =

- Former provincial political party
- Founded: 1932
- Dissolved: October 8, 1961; Entered into a coalition with the Canadian Labour Congress to form the New Democratic Party of Manitoba
- Headquarters: Winnipeg, Manitoba
- Ideology: Social democracy Democratic socialism Agrarianism
- Political position: Left-wing
- International affiliation: Socialist International
- Colours: Green and Yellow

The Co-operative Commonwealth Federation (Manitoba) (CCF), known informally as the Manitoba CCF, was a provincial branch of the national Canadian party by the same name. The national CCF was the dominant social-democratic party in Canada from the 1930s to the early 1960s, when it merged with the labour movement to become the New Democratic Party. The Manitoba CCF, created in 1932, played the same role at the provincial level.

== History ==
=== Origins and early challenges ===
It was initially a small organization, and was supported by members of the Independent Labour Party, which had existed in the province since 1920. The ILP and CCF were brought into a formal alliance in 1933, despite misgivings from some in the former party.

The ILP was the leading social-democratic party in Manitoba prior to the CCF's formation. It had a reliable support base in Winnipeg, but had virtually no organization in the countryside. The CCF was formed to bring labour and farm groups into the same political camp. Some ILP members saw this as diluting their party's integrity.

=== CCF in Government, its struggles, challenges and setbacks ===
The provincial CCF had become stronger by 1936, and the ILP's Winnipeg-area candidates in that year's provincial election were referred to as "ILP-CCF". After the election, some disgruntled ILP members succeeded in temporarily disaffiliating the parties. Pressure from David Lewis and J. S. Woodsworth brought about a quick realignment, but relations remained strained.

At the start of World War II, the ILP and CCF were again in disagreement: the ILP supported an all-out war effort, whereas the CCF supported the conscription of "wealth rather than men".

This controversy contributed to the defeat of federal CCF MP Abraham Albert Heaps in the election of 1940.

The CCF eventually gained control of the ILP's internal organization, and the two parties were effectively one after 1941. The ILP formally disbanded in 1943.

In late 1940, the ILP-CCF accepted an offer by Manitoba Premier John Bracken to become part of an all-party government. This decision was opposed by some national leaders (including David Lewis), but was supported by local figures such as Seymour Farmer, who had led the ILP parliamentary group since 1935. On November 4, 1940, Farmer became the first socialist politician in Canadian history to attain cabinet rank, having been sworn in as Minister of Labour.

The CCF's experience in the coalition government was a disappointment to the party. The party leaders had hoped to use their influence to promote progressive labour legislation; instead, Bracken's government forced Farmer to seek "free votes" on his ministry's initiatives (these soon became party votes, with the CCF invariably losing). Farmer resigned from government in December 1942, and the CCF formally left the coalition in 1943. The CCF's time in government demoralized its membership, and hindered its electoral fortunes – voters elected only three CCF MLAs in 1941.

For the next few years, the CCF's primary concern was preventing infiltration from Communists (then officially represented by the Labour Progressive Party). Some figures in the LPP favoured cooperation with the CCF; the CCF leadership was fully opposed to this, and suspended two prominent Manitoba MLAs – Berry Richards and D.L. Johnson when they advocated formal cooperation. Accusations of being "Communist sympathizers" would hinder the party's fortunes for years to come.

In 1944, the national party was performing well in the polls and the party's membership had grown from 800 in 1942 to over 4,000 by 1944. Furthermore, a CCF government was elected in neighbouring Saskatchewan. The Manitoba CCF hoped to repeat this success the following year, but won only 10 seats out of 55. This failure was due in part to the province's outdated electoral boundaries, which favoured rural ridings at the expense of the cities.

Farmer resigned as party leader in 1947, and was replaced the following year by Edwin Hansford. The party won only seven seats in the election of 1949, amid a period of generally poor fortunes for left-wing parties in Canada. Hansford resigned as leader in 1952, replaced by Scottie Bryce.

The selection of Bryce was somewhat unusual, in that he was a federal MP without experience in the provincial house. He was apparently chosen as party leader due to fears that his federal seat would be eliminated by redistribution. Bryce ultimately decided against joining provincial politics, and was replaced by Lloyd Stinson before the 1953 election.

Stinson was probably the most adept of the Manitoba CCF's leaders, but he was unable to translate his personal popularity and charisma into victory at the polls. The party fell to five seats in 1953, during the first election to be held after the province's Liberal-Conservative coalition dissolved amid acrimony.

The Liberal government of Douglas Campbell became increasingly unpopular in the mid-1950s, and the CCF was able to tap into some of the public's discontent. Stinson was relatively popular among the province's centre-left voters, and the CCF increased its seat total to eleven in 1958.

The primary benefactors of Campbell's unpopularity, however, were the Progressive Conservatives under Dufferin Roblin, who won 26 seats out of 57. The Campbell government initially attempted to stay in power through an alliance with the CCF, which turned down this offer. Roblin was sworn in as Premier later in the year.

Roblin's government put the CCF in a paradoxical situation. Many of Roblin's policies were similar to the CCF platform and he outflanked the CCF in a bid for centre-left voters. The CCF was forced to lend support to Roblin's initiatives, thereby providing his ministry with the legislative record it needed to win a majority the following year. The Tories won 36 seats in 1959, with the CCF dropping to 10. Stinson resigned as party leader in 1960, and was replaced by Russ Paulley.

=== Decline ===
The national CCF had fallen to eight seats in 1958, losing much of its support to John Diefenbaker's Tories. When the national party "reinvented" itself in 1961 as the New Democratic Party (via an alliance with the Canadian Labour Congress), the provincial CCF followed suit.

The "New Party" in Manitoba was affiliated with the Manitoba Federation of Labour, and Paulley became the first provincial NDP leader later in 1961.

The CCF ceased to exist, having been superseded by the New Democratic Party of Manitoba in much the same way as it had previously superseded the ILP.

== Party leaders ==
1. Seymour Farmer 1936–1947
2. Edwin Hansford 1948–1952
3. William Bryce 1952
4. Lloyd Stinson 1952–1960 (house leader until 1953)
5. Russell Paulley 1960–1961

All party leaders were elected to their position without opposition.

== Election results ==
Year	CCF Leader	Seats won	Seat change	Seat Place	Popular vote	% of popular vote	Result
1936	Farmer	7 / 55	▲2*	3rd	30,983	12.0%	Liberal-Progressive majority
1941	Farmer	3 / 55	▼4	3rd	28,301	17.0%	Liberal-Progressive-Conservative-CCF coalition
1945	Farmer	9 / 55	▲6	3rd	73,988	33.8%	Liberal-Progressive-Conservative coalition
1949	Hansford	7 / 57	▼2	3rd	49,933	25.3%	Liberal-Progressive-Conservative coalition
1953	Stinson	5 / 57	▼2	3rd	44,332	16.6%	Liberal-Progressive majority
1958	Stinson	11 / 57	▲6	3rd		20.0%	Progressive Conservative minority
1959	Stinson	10 / 57	▼1	3rd	68,149	21.9%	Progressive Conservative majority

*Ran as the ILP-CCF in 1932, seats compared to the Independent Labour Party's 5 seats in the previous election.

== See also ==
- List of political parties in Canada
- List of Manitoba CCF/NDP members
- Social Democratic Party of Canada
- Independent Labour Party
- Beatrice Brigden
