= 28th Manitoba Legislature =

Legislature of Manitoba, 1966–1969

The members of the 28th Manitoba Legislature were elected in the Manitoba general election held in June 1966. The legislature sat from December 5, 1966, to May 22, 1969.

The Progressive Conservative Party led by Duff Roblin formed the government. Walter Weir became Premier in 1967 after Roblin resigned to run unsuccessfully for the federal Progressive Conservative Party leadership.

Gildas Molgat of the Liberal Party was Leader of the Opposition.

A new sales tax of 5% was introduced effective June 1, 1967.

James Bilton served as speaker for the assembly.

There were three sessions of the 28th Legislature:

Session	Start	End
1st	December 5, 1966	May 4, 1967
2nd	March 7, 1968	May 25, 1968
3rd	February 27, 1969	May 22, 1969

Richard Spink Bowles was Lieutenant Governor of Manitoba.

== Members of the Assembly ==
The following members were elected to the assembly in 1966:

Member	Electoral district	Party	First elected / previously elected	No.# of term(s)	Notes
J. Douglas Watt	Arthur	Progressive Conservative	1959	3rd term	
Stephen Patrick	Assiniboia	Liberal	1962	2nd term	
Rod Clement	Birtle-Russell	Liberal	1949, 1966	4th term*	Until June 5, 1968
Harry Graham (1969)	Birtle-Russell	Progressive Conservative	1969	1st term	From February 20, 1969
Reginald Lissaman	Brandon	Progressive Conservative	1952	6th term	
Sam Uskiw	Brokenhead	NDP	1966	1st term	
Ben Hanuschak	Burrows	NDP	1966	1st term	
Leonard Barkman	Carillon	Liberal	1962	2nd term	
Gordon Beard	Churchill (Note: Election held July 7, 1966)	Progressive Conservative	1962	2nd term	Until October 8, 1968
Gordon Beard	Churchill	Independent	1962	2nd term	Until October 8, 1968
Joseph Borowski (1969)	Churchill	NDP	1969	1st term	From February 20, 1969
Thelma Forbes	Cypress	Progressive Conservative	1959	3rd term	
Stewart McLean	Dauphin	Progressive Conservative	1958	4th term	
William Homer Hamilton	Dufferin	Progressive Conservative	1959	3rd term	
Russell Doern	Elmwood	NDP	1966	1st term	
John Tanchak	Emerson	Liberal	1957	5th term	
Michael Kawchuk	Ethelbert Plains	NDP	1966	1st term	
Peter Masniuk	Fisher	Progressive Conservative	1966	1st term	
Charles Witney	Flin Flon	Progressive Conservative	1959	3rd term	
Sterling Lyon	Fort Garry	Progressive Conservative	1958	4th term	
Gurney Evans	Fort Rouge	Progressive Conservative	1953	5th term	
George Johnson	Gimli	Progressive Conservative	1958	4th term	
Nelson Shoemaker	Gladstone	Liberal	1958	4th term	
Earl Dawson	Hamiota	Liberal	1966	1st term	
Sidney Green	Inkster	NDP	1966	1st term	
Peter Fox	Kildonan	NDP	1966	1st term	
Oscar Bjornson	Lac du Bonnet	Progressive Conservative	1959	3rd term	
Douglas Lloyd Campbell	Lakeside	Liberal	1922	12th term	
Albert Vielfaure	La Verendrye	Liberal	1962	2nd term	
Lemuel Harris	Logan	NDP	1959	3rd term	
Walter Weir	Minnedosa	Progressive Conservative	1959	3rd term	
Harold Shewman	Morris	Progressive Conservative	1949	6th term	Died in office July 13, 1968
Warner Jorgenson (1969)	Morris	Progressive Conservative	1969	1st term	From February 20, 1969
Obie Baizley	Osborne	Progressive Conservative	1959	3rd term	
Carolyne Morrison	Pembina	Progressive Conservative	1960	3rd term	
Gordon Johnston	Portage la Prairie	Liberal	1962	2nd term	
Russell Paulley	Radisson	NDP	1953	5th term	
Jacob Froese	Rhineland	Social Credit	1959	3rd term	
Sidney Spivak	River Heights	Progressive Conservative	1966	1st term	
Wally McKenzie	Roblin	Progressive Conservative	1966	1st term	
Henry Einarson	Rock Lake	Progressive Conservative	1966	1st term	
Harry Enns	Rockwood—Iberville	Progressive Conservative	1966	1st term	
Joseph Jeannotte	Rupertsland	Progressive Conservative	1958	4th term	
Laurent Desjardins	St. Boniface	Liberal	1959	3rd term	
Elman Guttormson	St. George	Liberal	1956	5th term	
Douglas Stanes	St. James	Progressive Conservative	1958	4th term	
Saul Cherniack	St. Johns	NDP	1962	2nd term	
Robert Steen	St. Matthews	Progressive Conservative	1966	1st term	
Donald Craik	St. Vital	Progressive Conservative	1966	1st term	
Gildas Molgat	Ste. Rose	Liberal	1953	5th term	
Thomas P. Hillhouse	Selkirk	Liberal	1950	6th term	
Saul Miller	Seven Oaks	NDP	1966	1st term	
Malcolm Earl McKellar	Souris-Lansdowne	Progressive Conservative	1958	4th term	
Fred Klym	Springfield	Progressive Conservative	1959	3rd term	
James Bilton	Swan River	Progressive Conservative	1962	2nd term	
John Carroll	The Pas	Progressive Conservative	1958	4th term	
Edward Dow	Turtle Mountain	Liberal	1959, 1966	2nd term*	Vacated seat January 30, 1968 due to election results being overturned but was re-elected in the subsequent By-election on March 4, 1968
Morris McGregor	Virden	Progressive Conservative	1962	2nd term	
Philip Petursson	Wellington	NDP	1966	1st term	
James Cowan	Winnipeg Centre	Progressive Conservative	1958	4th term	
Dufferin Roblin	Wolseley	Progressive Conservative	1949	6th term	Until May 1968
Leonard Claydon (1969)	Wolseley	Progressive Conservative	1969	1st term	From February 20, 1969

== By-elections ==
By-elections were held to replace members for various reasons:

Electoral district	Member elected	Affiliation	Election date	Reason
Turtle Mountain	Edward Dow	Liberal	March 4, 1968	Results of 1966 election overturned
Birtle-Russell	Harry Graham	Progressive Conservative	February 20, 1969	R Clement resigned to run unsuccessfully for federal seat
Churchill	Joseph Borowski	NDP	February 20, 1969	G Beard resigned October 8, 1968
Morris	Warner Jorgenson	Progressive Conservative	February 20, 1969	H Shewman died July 13, 1968
Wolseley	Leonard Claydon	Progressive Conservative	February 20, 1969	D Roblin resigned to run unsuccessfully for federal seat
