= 27th Manitoba Legislature =

Legislature of Manitoba, 1963–1966

The members of the 27th Manitoba Legislature were elected in the Manitoba general election held in December 1962. The legislature sat from February 28, 1963, to May 18, 1966.

The Progressive Conservative Party led by Duff Roblin formed the government.

Gildas Molgat of the Liberal Party was Leader of the Opposition.

James Bilton served as speaker for the assembly.

There were five sessions of the 27th Legislature:

Session	Start	End
1st	February 28, 1963	May 6, 1963
2nd	February 6, 1964	April 16, 1964
3rd	August 17, 1964	August 27, 1964
4th	February 22, 1965	May 11, 1965
5th	February 3, 1966	April 26, 1966

Errick Willis was Lieutenant Governor of Manitoba until November 1, 1965, when Richard Spink Bowles became lieutenant governor.

== Members of the Assembly ==
The following members were elected to the assembly in 1962:

Member	Electoral district	Party	First elected / previously elected	No.# of term(s)	Notes
J. Douglas Watt	Arthur	Progressive Conservative	1959	2nd term	
Stephen Patrick	Assiniboia	Liberal	1962	1st term	
Robert Smellie	Birtle-Russell	Progressive Conservative	1962	1st term	
Reginald Lissaman	Brandon	Progressive Conservative	1952	5th term	
Edward Schreyer	Brokenhead	NDP	1958	3rd term	
Mark Smerchanski	Burrows	Liberal	1962	1st term	
Leonard Barkman	Carillon	Liberal	1962	1st term	
Gordon Beard	Churchill (Note: Election held January 4, 1963)	Progressive Conservative	1962	1st term	
Thelma Forbes	Cypress	Progressive Conservative	1959	2nd term	
Stewart McLean	Dauphin	Progressive Conservative	1958	3rd term	
William Homer Hamilton	Dufferin	Progressive Conservative	1959	2nd term	
Steve Peters	Elmwood	NDP	1958	3rd term	
John Tanchak	Emerson	Liberal	1957	4th term	
Michael Hryhorczuk	Ethelbert Plains	Liberal	1949	5th term	
Emil Moeller (Note: At first, Peter Wagner declared winner; result revised after a miscount was declared for one poll)	Fisher	Progressive Conservative	1962	1st term	
Charles Witney	Flin Flon	Progressive Conservative	1959	2nd term	
Sterling Lyon	Fort Garry	Progressive Conservative	1958	3rd term	
Gurney Evans	Fort Rouge	Progressive Conservative	1953	4th term	
George Johnson	Gimli	Progressive Conservative	1958	3rd term	
Nelson Shoemaker	Gladstone	Liberal	1958	3rd term	
Barry Strickland	Hamiota	Progressive Conservative	1958	3rd term	
Morris Gray	Inkster	NDP	1941	7th term	
James Mills	Kildonan	Progressive Conservative	1962	1st term	
Oscar Bjornson	Lac du Bonnet	Progressive Conservative	1959	2nd term	
Douglas Lloyd Campbell	Lakeside	Liberal	1922	11th term	
Albert Vielfaure	La Verendrye	Liberal	1962	1st term	
Lemuel Harris	Logan	NDP	1959	2nd term	
Walter Weir	Minnedosa	Progressive Conservative	1959	2nd term	
Harold Shewman	Morris	Progressive Conservative	1949	5th term	
Obie Baizley	Osborne	Progressive Conservative	1959	2nd term	
Carolyne Morrison	Pembina	Progressive Conservative	1960	2nd term	
Gordon Johnston	Portage la Prairie	Liberal	1962	1st term	
Russell Paulley	Radisson	NDP	1953	4th term	
Jacob Froese	Rhineland	Social Credit	1959	2nd term	
Maitland Steinkopf (Note: Resigned August 24, 1964, and regained seat in a by-election on September 30, 1964.)	River Heights	Progressive Conservative	1962	1st term	
Keith Alexander	Roblin	Progressive Conservative	1958	3rd term	
Abram Harrison	Rock Lake	Progressive Conservative	1943	7th term	
George Hutton	Rockwood—Iberville	Progressive Conservative	1959	2nd term	
Joseph Jeannotte	Rupertsland	Progressive Conservative	1958	3rd term	
Laurent Desjardins	St. Boniface	Liberal	1959	2nd term	
Elman Guttormson	St. George	Liberal	1956	4th term	
Douglas Stanes	St. James	Progressive Conservative	1958	3rd term	
Saul Cherniack	St. Johns	NDP	1962	1st term	
William G. Martin	St. Matthews	Progressive Conservative	1958	3rd term	
Fred Groves	St. Vital	Progressive Conservative	1958	3rd term	
Gildas Molgat	Ste. Rose	Liberal	1953	4th term	
Thomas P. Hillhouse	Selkirk	Liberal	1950	5th term	
Arthur E. Wright	Seven Oaks	NDP	1958	3rd term	
Malcolm Earl McKellar	Souris-Lansdowne	Progressive Conservative	1958	3rd term	
Fred Klym	Springfield	Progressive Conservative	1959	2nd term	
James Bilton	Swan River	Progressive Conservative	1962	1st term	
John Carroll	The Pas	Progressive Conservative	1958	3rd term	
Peter J. McDonald	Turtle Mountain	Progressive Conservative	1962	1st term	
Morris McGregor	Virden	Progressive Conservative	1962	1st term	
Richard Seaborn	Wellington	Progressive Conservative	1958	3rd term	
James Cowan	Winnipeg Centre	Progressive Conservative	1958	3rd term	
Dufferin Roblin	Wolseley	Progressive Conservative	1949	5th term	

== By-elections ==
One by-election was held during this legislative sitting:

By-elections during the 27th Manitoba Legislature
Electoral district	Member elected	Affiliation	Election date	Reason
River Heights	Maitland Steinkopf	Progressive Conservative	September 30, 1964	M Steinkopf resigned August 24, 1964, after his involvement in a government land purchase was called into question
