= 26th Manitoba Legislature =

The members of the 26th Manitoba Legislature were elected in the Manitoba general election held in May 1959. The legislature sat from June 9, 1959, to November 9, 1962.

The Progressive Conservative Party led by Duff Roblin formed the government.

Douglas Lloyd Campbell of the Liberal-Progressive Party was Leader of the Opposition. After Campbell resigned in 1961, Gildas Molgat became opposition leader.

In 1961, the Liberal-Progressive Party became known as the Manitoba Liberal Party and the Co-operative Commonwealth Federation (CCF) was replaced by the New Democratic Party of Manitoba.

Abram Harrison served as speaker for the assembly.

There were five sessions of the 26th Legislature:

| Session | Start | End |
|---|---|---|
| 1st | June 9, 1959 | August 4, 1959 |
| 2nd | January 19, 1960 | March 26, 1960 |
| 3rd | February 14, 1961 | April 20, 1961 |
| 4th | October 16, 1961 | October 20, 1961 |
| 5th | February 15, 1962 | May 1, 1962 |

John Stewart McDiarmid was Lieutenant Governor of Manitoba until January 15, 1960, when Errick Willis became lieutenant governor.

== Members of the Assembly ==
The following members were elected to the assembly in 1959:

| Member | Electoral district | Party | First elected / previously elected | No.# of term(s) | Notes |
|---|---|---|---|---|---|
| John Cobb | Arthur | Progressive Conservative | 1958 | 2nd term | Died in office August 21, 1959 |
| Douglas Watt (1959) | Arthur | Progressive Conservative | 1959 | 1st term | From November 26, 1959 |
| George William Johnson | Assiniboia | Progressive Conservative | 1959 | 1st term | |
| Robert Smellie | Birtle-Russell | Progressive Conservative | 1959 | 1st term | |
| Reginald Lissaman | Brandon | Progressive Conservative | 1952 | 4th term | |
| Edward Schreyer | Brokenhead | CCF | 1958 | 2nd term | |
| Edward Schreyer | Brokenhead | NDP | 1958 | 2nd term | |
| John Hawryluk | Burrows | CCF | 1958 | 2nd term | |
| John Hawryluk | Burrows | NDP | 1958 | 2nd term | |
| Edmond Prefontaine | Carillon | Liberal-Progressive/ Liberal | 1935 | 8th term | |
| John Ingebrigtson | Churchill | Progressive Conservative | 1959 | 1st term | |
| Marcel Boulic | Cypress | Progressive Conservative | 1958 | 2nd term | Died in office September 22, 1959 |
| Thelma Forbes (1959) | Cypress | Progressive Conservative | 1959 | 1st term | From November 26, 1959 |
| Stewart McLean | Dauphin | Progressive Conservative | 1958 | 2nd term | |
| William Homer Hamilton | Dufferin | Progressive Conservative | 1959 | 1st term | |
| Steve Peters | Elmwood | CCF | 1958 | 2nd term | |
| Steve Peters | Elmwood | NDP | 1958 | 2nd term | |
| John Tanchak | Emerson | Liberal-Progressive/ Liberal | 1957 | 3rd term | |
| Michael Hryhorczuk | Ethelbert Plains | Liberal-Progressive/ Liberal | 1949 | 4th term | |
| Peter Wagner | Fisher | CCF | 1958 | 2nd term | |
| Peter Wagner | Fisher | NDP | 1958 | 2nd term | |
| Charles Witney | Flin Flon | Progressive Conservative | 1959 | 1st term | |
| Sterling Lyon | Fort Garry | Progressive Conservative | 1958 | 2nd term | |
| Gurney Evans | Fort Rouge | Progressive Conservative | 1953 | 3rd term | |
| George Johnson | Gimli | Progressive Conservative | 1958 | 2nd term | |
| Nelson Shoemaker | Gladstone | Liberal-Progressive/ Liberal | 1958 | 2nd term | |
| Barry Strickland | Hamiota | Progressive Conservative | 1958 | 2nd term | |
| Morris Gray | Inkster | CCF | 1941 | 6th term | |
| Morris Gray | Inkster | NDP | 1941 | 6th term | |
| Anthony J. Reid | Kildonan | CCF | 1958 | 2nd term | |
| Anthony J. Reid | Kildonan | NDP | 1958 | 2nd term | |
| Oscar Bjornson | Lac du Bonnet | Progressive Conservative | 1959 | 1st term | |
| Douglas Lloyd Campbell | Lakeside | Liberal-Progressive/ Liberal | 1922 | 10th term | |
| Stan Roberts | La Verendrye | Liberal-Progressive/ Liberal | 1958 | 2nd term | |
| Lemuel Harris | Logan | CCF | 1959 | 1st term | |
| Lemuel Harris | Logan | NDP | 1959 | 1st term | |
| Walter Weir | Minnedosa | Progressive Conservative | 1959 | 1st term | |
| Harold Shewman | Morris | Progressive Conservative | 1949 | 4th term | |
| Obie Baizley | Osborne | Progressive Conservative | 1959 | 1st term | |
| Maurice Ridley | Pembina | Progressive Conservative | 1957 | 3rd term | Died in office October 2, 1960 |
| Carolyne Morrison (1960) | Pembina | Progressive Conservative | 1960 | 1st term | From December 9, 1960 |
| John Christianson | Portage la Prairie | Progressive Conservative | 1959 | 1st term | |
| Russell Paulley | Radisson | CCF | 1953 | 3rd term | |
| Russell Paulley | Radisson | NDP | 1953 | 3rd term | |
| Wallace C. Miller | Rhineland | Liberal-Progressive/ Liberal | 1936 | 7th term | Died in office October 4, 1959 |
| Jacob Froese (1959) | Rhineland | Social Credit | 1959 | 1st term | From November 26, 1959 |
| William B. Scarth | River Heights | Progressive Conservative | 1958 | 2nd term | |
| Keith Alexander | Roblin | Progressive Conservative | 1958 | 2nd term | |
| Abram Harrison | Rock Lake | Progressive Conservative | 1943 | 6th term | |
| George Hutton | Rockwood—Iberville | Progressive Conservative | 1959 | 1st term | |
| Joseph Jeannotte | Rupertsland | Progressive Conservative | 1958 | 2nd term | |
| Laurent Desjardins | St. Boniface | Liberal-Progressive/ Liberal | 1959 | 1st term | |
| Elman Guttormson | St. George | Liberal-Progressive/ Liberal | 1956 | 3rd term | |
| Douglas Stanes | St. James | Progressive Conservative | 1958 | 2nd term | |
| David Orlikow | St. Johns | CCF | 1958 | 2nd term | |
| David Orlikow | St. Johns | NDP | 1958 | 2nd term | |
| William G. Martin | St. Matthews | Progressive Conservative | 1958 | 2nd term | |
| Fred Groves | St. Vital | Progressive Conservative | 1958 | 2nd term | |
| Gildas Molgat | Ste. Rose | Liberal-Progressive/ Liberal | 1953 | 3rd term | |
| Thomas P. Hillhouse | Selkirk | Liberal-Progressive/ Liberal | 1950 | 4th term | |
| Arthur E. Wright | Seven Oaks | CCF | 1958 | 2nd term | |
| Arthur E. Wright | Seven Oaks | NDP | 1958 | 2nd term | |
| Malcolm Earl McKellar | Souris-Lansdowne | Progressive Conservative | 1958 | 2nd term | |
| Fred Klym | Springfield | Progressive Conservative | 1959 | 1st term | |
| Albert H. C. Corbett | Swan River | Progressive Conservative | 1958 | 2nd term | |
| John Carroll | The Pas | Progressive Conservative | 1958 | 2nd term | |
| Errick Willis | Turtle Mountain | Progressive Conservative | 1936 | 7th term | Named Lieutenant Governor and resigned seat but remained in Cabinet until January 15, 1960 |
| Edward Dow (1959) | Turtle Mountain | Liberal-Progressive/ Liberal | 1959 | 1st term | From November 26, 1959 |
| John Thompson | Virden | Progressive Conservative | 1953 | 3rd term | |
| Richard Seaborn | Wellington | Progressive Conservative | 1958 | 2nd term | |
| James Cowan | Winnipeg Centre | Progressive Conservative | 1958 | 2nd term | |
| Dufferin Roblin | Wolseley | Progressive Conservative | 1949 | 4th term | |

== By-elections ==
By-elections were held to replace members for various reasons:

| Electoral district | Member elected | Affiliation | Election date | Reason |
|---|---|---|---|---|
| Arthur | Douglas Watt | Progressive Conservative | November 26, 1959 | J Cobb died August 21, 1959 |
| Cypress | Thelma Forbes | Progressive Conservative | November 26, 1959 | M Boulic died September 22, 1959 |
| Rhineland | Jacob Froese | Social Credit | November 26, 1959 | W Miller died October 4, 1959 |
| Turtle Mountain | Edward Dow | Liberal-Progressive | November 26, 1959 | E Willis named Lieutenant Governor January 15, 1960 |
| Pembina | Carolyne Morrison | Progressive Conservative | December 9, 1960 | M Ridley died October 2, 1960 |
