= New Democratic Party of Manitoba candidates in the 1969 Manitoba provincial election =

The New Democratic Party of Manitoba (NDP) fielded a full slate of 57 candidates in the 1969 provincial election, and won 28 seats to emerge as the largest party in the provincial legislature. After a brief period of political uncertainty, the party was able to form a minority government.

Many of the party's candidates have their own biography pages; information about others may be found here. This page also includes information about New Democratic Party candidates in by-elections between 1969 and 1971.

== Candidates ==
=== Birtle-Russell: Donald Kostesky ===
Donald Kostesky was 22 years old in 1969, and was a farmer in Rossburn. He joined the New Democratic Party in 1964, and first ran for the party in a February 1969 by-election. He finished a close second in the general election, despite the fact that his party did not have strong historical roots in the Birtle-Russell division. His brother, Ronald Kostesky, was a New Democratic Party candidate in the 1966 provincial election.

Kostesky was listed as the CEO and general-manager of Farmers Co-op Seed Plant Ltd. in 1994. He is now retired from farming, but remains CEO of the seed co-operative, which has been renamed Red Sper Enterprises Ltd.

Electoral record
Election	Division	Party	Votes	%	Place	Winner
provincial by-election, 20 February 1969	Birtle-Russell	New Democratic Party	1,034	22.69	2/3	Harry Graham, Progressive Conservative
1969 provincial	Birtle-Russell	New Democratic Party	2,263	37.74	2/3	Harry Graham, Progressive Conservative

=== Morris: William Loftus ===
William Thomas Loftus (June 21, 1916 – August 6, 2008) was raised and educated in the Norwood area of Winnipeg, and attended the University of Manitoba. He was a farmer in La Salle at the time of the election. He was also an Air Canada captain of long standing, having joined the service in 1944. In religion, he was a member of the United Church of Canada.

Loftus ran as a New Democratic Party candidate in three provincial elections, in an area where the party did not have a strong organizational base. He later worked for the government, after the NDP won election under Edward Schreyer's leadership.

Electoral record
Election	Division	Party	Votes	%	Place	Winner
1966 provincial	Morris	New Democratic Party	370	11.65	3/3	Harry Shewman, Progressive Conservative
provincial by-election, 20 February 1969	Morris	New Democratic Party	276	8.46	3/3	Warner Jorgenson, Progressive Conservative
1969 provincial	Morris	New Democratic Party	712	15.48	3/4	Warner Jorgenson, Progressive Conservative
