= William Hutton =

William Hutton may refer to:

== Sports ==
- Bill Hutton (William David Hutton, 1910–1974), Canadian professional ice hockey defenceman
- Tom Hutton (American football) (William Thomas Hutton, born 1972), former professional American football player
- Percy Hutton (William Frederick Percy Hutton, 1876–1951), Australian cricketer

== Government ==
- William Hutton (Manitoba politician), politician and clergyman in Manitoba, Canada
- William Hutton (colonial administrator), British author and colonial administrator
- William Hutton, High Sheriff of Lincolnshire in 1832

== Others ==
- William Hutton (historian) (1723–1815), poet and historian from Birmingham, England
- William Hutton (1797–1860) (1798–1860), geologist
- William Holden Hutton (1860–1930), Dean of Winchester in the early decade of the 19th Century
- William Rich Hutton (1826–1901), civil engineer known for his sketches and diary of life in the pueblo of Los Angeles
- Will Hutton (William Nicholas Hutton, born 1950), British writer, weekly columnist and former editor-in-chief for The Observer
