= 1968 Winnipeg municipal election =

The 1968 Winnipeg municipal election was held on October 23, 1968, to elect mayors, councillors and school trustees in the City of Winnipeg, the Metropolitan Corporation of Greater Winnipeg, and the city's suburban communities. Most elections were conducted via a single transferable ballot.

== Results ==
=== Winnipeg ===
1968 Winnipeg municipal election: Mayor of Winnipeg
Candidate	Votes	%
(x)Stephen Juba	48,757	75.18
Eric Wells	16,100	24.82
Total valid votes	64,857	100.00

Leonard Claydon, Gurzon Harvey, Ernest Brotman, Gordon Fines, Lillian Hallonquist, Magnus Eliason, Paul Parashin, Joseph Cropo and Max Mulder were elected to two-year terms on the Winnipeg City Council.

Information taken from the Winnipeg Free Press, 24 October 1968.

== Greater Winnipeg ==
1968 Winnipeg municipal election: Metro Councillor, Ward Nine
Party	Candidate	Votes	%
NDP	William Hutton	5,106	43.78
Greater Winnipeg Election Committee	J. Ross White	4,739	40.63
Independent	William Hawryluk	1,819	15.59
Total valid votes		11,664	

Hawryluk's votes were transferred as follows: Hutton 721, White 681. 417 votes were not transferred.

1968 Winnipeg municipal election: Metro Councillor, Ward Nine
Party	Candidate	Votes	%
NDP	William Hutton	5,827	51.81
Greater Winnipeg Election Committee	J. Ross White	5,420	48.19
Total valid votes		11,247	
