= Manitoba Liberal Party candidates in the 1966 Manitoba provincial election =

The Manitoba Liberal Party fielded 56 candidates in the 1966 provincial election, and won 14 seats to retain their status as the second-largest party in the legislature. They formed in the official opposition in the legislature after the election.

Many of the party's candidates have their own biography pages; information about others may be found here. This page also include information about Liberal candidates in by-elections between 1966 and 1969.

== Candidates ==
=== Wolseley: Julius Koteles ===
Julius Koteles was a lawyer in Winnipeg. He received a Bachelor of Arts degree from the University of Manitoba in 1952, and a Bachelor of Laws degree from the same institution in 1956. During his youth, he was president of the Manitoba Young Liberals Association. He was later a director of the Royal Winnipeg Ballet and the Mount Carmel Clinic, and the executive director of the Folk Art Festival.

Koteles was a Liberal candidate in the 1966 general election and in a 1969 by-election. On the former occasion, he defeated Charles Huband to win the party's nomination. He was listed as was thirty-six years old in 1969, and during the by-election campaign called for more government assistance for working mothers and divorced or separated women. He also argued that public education costs had become too high due to excessive monies spent on schools classrooms; several teachers criticized this statement.

During the 1970s, Koteles served as national chair of the Canadian Consultative Council on Multicultural. He was a vocal opponent of federal minister John Munro's plans to reorient Canada's multiculturalism policy from established cultural programs to a focus on inclusivity and increased benefits for specific disadvantaged groups. His attacks on Munro became so vicious that the minister ordered him to resign in October 1976.

Koteles was later charged with, and found not guilty of, stealing funds from the Manitoba Folk Arts Council. Jurors in the case were informed that Koteles had deposited $103,759 of Folklorama funds into his law firm's trust account in the summer of 1976. He stated that the money was put there to ensure creditors would be paid. Evidence also showed that Koteles transferred $43,540 from that account to his law firm's general account in 1976 in 1977. He said these funds were justifiable indemnifications for legal fees and losses to his business practice. Prior to the trial, it was reported that the Royal Canadian Mounted Police (RCMP) mysteriously cut short an investigation into an alleged theft by RCMP officers of Koteles's financial documents pertaining to the Folklorama case.

Electoral record
Election	Division	Party	Votes	%	Place	Winner
1966 provincial	Wolseley	Liberal	1,780	27.78	2/3	Dufferin Roblin, Progressive Conservative
provincial by-election, 20 February 1969	Wolseley	Liberal	1,530	33.01	2/3	Leonard Claydon, Progressive Conservative

== By-elections ==
=== Birtle-Russell, 20 February 1969: Edward Shust ===
Edward Shust was forty-seven years old at the time of the by-election, and was a farmer in Rossburn. He was chair of the Pelly Trail School Division, and a former reeve of the Rural Municipality of Rossburn. He received 1,406 votes (30.85%), finishing second against Progressive Conservative candidate Harry Graham. Shust died in 1994, at age 73.

=== Churchill, 20 February 1969: Garry Walsh ===
Gary Walsh was originally from Sioux Lookout, Ontario, and moved to Thompson, Manitoba in 1962. He was twenty-seven years old at the time of the by-election, and was a restaurant owner and caterer. He was also a director of the Thompson Chamber of Commerce, and president of the Thompson Young Liberal Association. Walsh had intended to contest the 1966 provincial election, but his name did not appear on the ballot because of a problem with his nomination papers. He won the party's nomination for the 1969 by-election over two other candidates, Lynn Lake merchant Walter Parepeluk and J.A. Nabess, a former executive with the Indian-Métis Federation at Thompson. The nomination process was divisive, and it was reported that some area Liberals refused to support Walsh. He received 1,709 votes (21.17%), finishing third against New Democratic Party candidate Joseph Borowski.

=== Morris, 20 February 1969: Ralph Rasmussen ===
Ralph Rasmussen was thirty-eight years old at the time of the election. He held an agriculture degree from the University of Manitoba, and was a farmer in Starbuck. He also served as chair of the Manitoba Liberal Party's agriculture policy committee. Rasmussen was a former school trustee, and was identified as a Lutheran in religion. During the by-election, he called for the Manitoba Development Fund to be used as a tool of regional development in rural areas, and argued that the cost of education should be shifted away from property taxes. He received 841 votes (25.77%), finishing second against Progressive Conservative candidate Warner Jorgenson.

In 2008, Rasmussen was recognized by the Credit Union Central of Manitoba for contributing thirty-five years of service to the organization.

=== Wolseley, 20 February 1969: Julius Koteles ===
Julius Koteles received 1,530 votes (33.01%), finishing second against Progressive Conservative candidate Leonard Claydon. See above for Koteles's biography.
