= 1966 Manitoba general election =

- June 23, 1966

57 seats of the Legislative Assembly of Manitoba 29 seats were needed for a majority
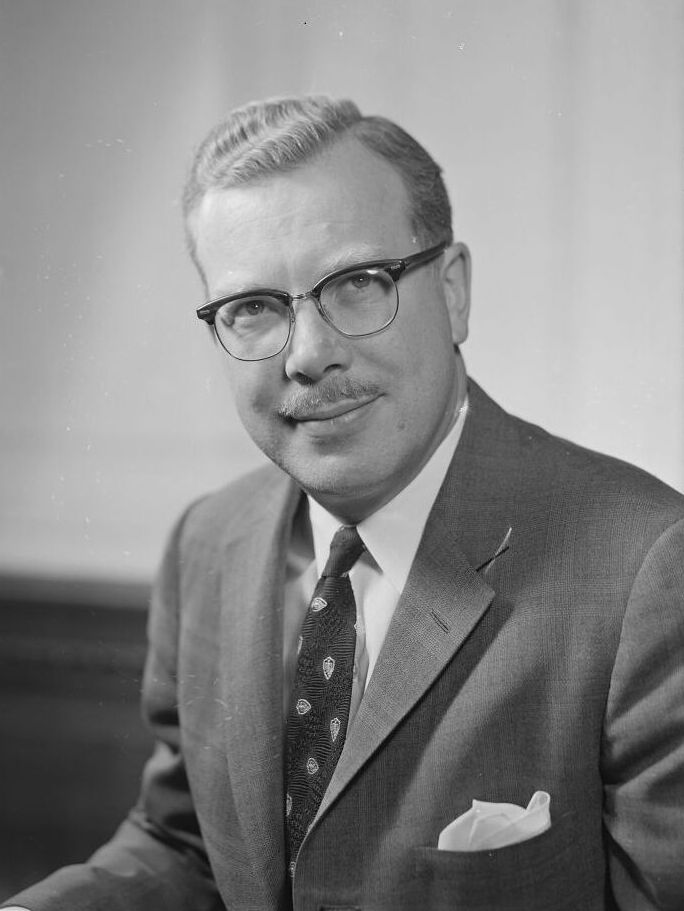

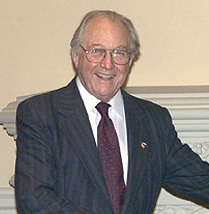
	First party	Second party
Leader	Duff Roblin	Gildas Molgat
Party	Progressive Conservative	Liberal
Leader since	June 17, 1954	April 20, 1961
Leader's seat	Wolseley	Ste. Rose
Last election	36	13
Seats won	31	14
Seat change	▼5	▲1
Popular vote	130,102	107,841
Percentage	39.96%	33.13%
Swing	▼4.74pp	▼2.97pp
	Third party	Fourth party
	NDP	SC
Leader	Russell Paulley	Jacob Froese
Party	New Democratic	Social Credit
Leader since	November 4, 1961	1959
Leader's seat	Radisson	Rhineland
Last election	7	1
Seats won	11	1
Seat change	▲4	0
Popular vote	75,333	11,538
Percentage	23.14%	3.54%
Swing	▲8.94pp	▲1.22pp
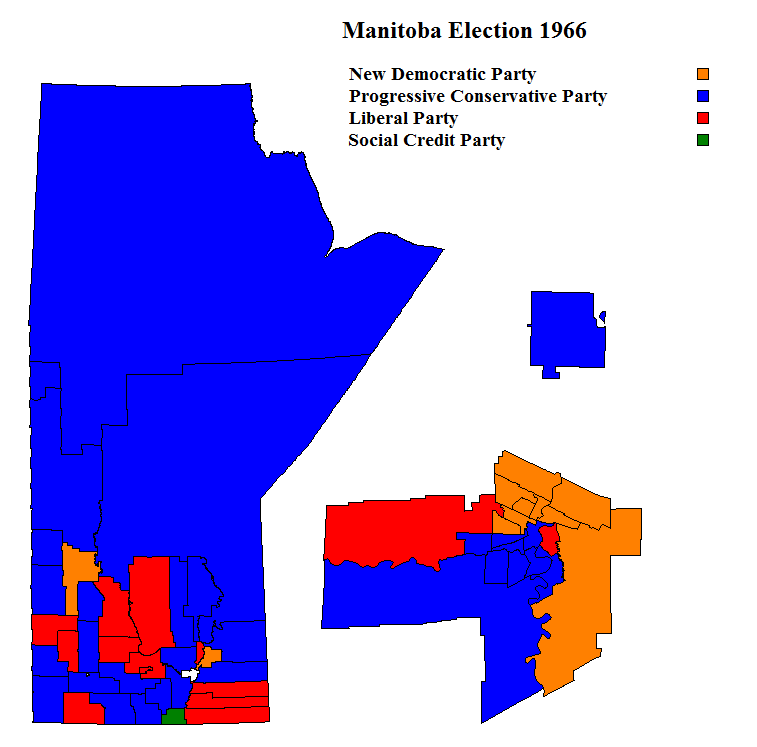
- Map of Election Results
Premier before election
Dufferin Roblin
Progressive Conservative
Premier after the election
Dufferin Roblin
Progressive Conservative

The 1966 Manitoba general election was held on June 23, 1966, to elect Members of the Legislative Assembly of the Province of Manitoba, Canada. It resulted in a third consecutive majority win for the Progressive Conservative Party led by Dufferin Roblin. Roblin's Tories won 31 seats, against 14 for the Liberal Party, 11 for the New Democratic Party and one for Social Credit.

== Results ==
Party	Party Leader	# of candidates	Seats			Popular Vote		
Party	Party Leader	# of candidates	1962	Elected	% Change	#	%	% Change
Progressive Conservative	Dufferin Roblin	57	36	31	-13.9%	130,102	39.96%	
Liberal	Gildas Molgat	56	13	14	+7.7%	107,841	33.13%	
New Democratic	Russell Paulley	53	7	11	+57.1%	75,333	23.14%	
Social Credit	Jacob Froese	16	1	1	-	11,538	3.54%	
Communist	William Cecil Ross	2	-	-	-	638	0.20%	
Independent		1	-	–	-	97	0.03%	
Total		185	57	57	-	325,549	100%	

Popular vote
PC	39.96%
Liberal	33.13%
New Democratic	23.14%
Social Credit	3.54%
Others	0.23%

Seats summary
PC	54.39%
Liberal	24.56%
New Democratic	19.30%
Social Credit	1.75%

Preceded by 1962 Manitoba election	List of Manitoba elections	Succeeded by 1969 Manitoba election

== See also ==
- List of Manitoba political parties

== Riding results ==
Party key:

- PC: Progressive Conservative Party of Manitoba
- L: Manitoba Liberal Party
- NDP: New Democratic Party of Manitoba
- SC: Manitoba Social Credit Party
- Comm: Communist Party of Canada - Manitoba
- Ind: Independent

Arthur:

- (incumbent)James Douglas Watt (PC) 1902
- Frank Patmore (L) 1807
- C.M. Robson (NDP) 494

Assiniboia:

- (incumbent)Stephen Patrick (L) 5168
- Stewart Millett (PC) 4800
- Charles Norman (NDP) 2943

Birtle-Russell:

- Rod Clement (L) 2223
- (incumbent)Robert G. Smellie (PC) 2078
- Ronald Kostesky (NDP) 446

Brandon:

- (incumbent)Reginald Lissaman (PC) 3863
- Terry Penton (L) 3696
- Harold Weitman (NDP) 1452
- Ben Van Hoffen (SC) 508

Brokenhead:

- Sam Uskiw (NDP) 1889
- George Mulder (PC) 1315
- Stanley Copp (Ind L) 669
- Ken Skiba (SC) 365

Burrows:

- Ben Hanuschak (NDP) 2415
- (incumbent)Mark Smerchanski (L) 1487
- Walter Paschak (PC) 1301

1966 Manitoba general election: Carillon
Party	Candidate	Votes	%	±%
Liberal	Leonard Barkman	2,352	63.83	
Progressive Conservative	John Blatz	1,217	33.03	
New Democratic	Elmer Reimer	116	3.12	
Total valid votes		3,685	100.00	
Rejected and discarded votes		59		
Turnout		3,744	59.84	
Electors on the lists		6,257		

Churchill (deferred to July 7, 1966):

- (incumbent)Gordon Beard (PC) 3159
- W.L. Hudson (L) 2192

Cypress:

- (incumbent)Thelma Forbes (PC) 2331
- Duncan Campbell (L) 1888

Dauphin:

- (incumbent)Stewart McLean (PC) 3149
- Edward Demkiw (L) 1512
- Michael Sotas (NDP) 236

Dufferin:

- (incumbent)Homer Hamilton (PC) 2135
- Cam Johnston (L) 1280
- Walter Taylor (SC) 583

Elmwood:

- Russell Doern (NDP) 2765
- Tom Snowden (PC) 1816
- John Kozoriz (L) 1458
- Walter Bowden (SC) 744

Emerson:

- (incumbent)John Tanchak (L) 2180
- Gabriel Girard (PC) 2015

Ethelbert Plains:

- Michael Kawchuk (NDP) 1246
- William Paziuk (L) 1182
- Melvin Pipe (SC) 884
- John Tycholis (PC) 548

Fisher:

- Peter Masniuk (PC) 1480
- Peter Wagner (NDP) 1368
- Arthur Devlin (L) 712
- John Palamarchuk (Ind) 97

Flin Flon:

- (incumbent)Charles Witney (PC) 1750
- Scott Day (NDP) 1090
- Mickey Perepeluk (L) 1071

Fort Garry:

- (incumbent)Sterling Lyon (PC) 6131
- Peter Stokes (L) 2435
- Vic Ratsma (NDP) 1769

Fort Rouge:

- (incumbent)Gurney Evans (PC) 3767
- Frank Muldoon (L) 2451
- Leonard Green (NDP) 1845

Gimli:

- (incumbent)George Johnson (PC) 1981
- Gunnar Eggerston (L) 1021
- Zado Zator (NDP) 767

Gladstone:

- (incumbent)Nelson Shoemaker (L) 2926
- John McPhedran (PC) 1787
- William Yuel (NDP) 236

Hamiota:

- Earl Dawson (L) 2194
- (incumbent)Barry Strickland (PC) 2043
- M.S. Antonation (NDP) 412

Inkster:

- Sidney Green (NDP) 3644
- Olga Fuga (PC) 1713
- Ray Babick (L) 1557
- William Cecil Ross (Comm) 312

Kildonan:

- Peter Fox (NDP) 4644
- (incumbent)James Mills (PC) 3808
- Jim Smith (L) 2966
- Henry Redekopp (SC) 1331

Lac Du Bonnet:

- (incumbent)Oscar Bjornson (PC) 1342
- James Desilets (L) 1262
- Walter Zarecki (NDP) 1151
- Ruben Thomas (SC) 474

Lakeside:

- (incumbent)Douglas Campbell (L) 1780
- Frank Sims (PC) 1428
- Francis Mason (NDP) 272

La Verendrye:

- (incumbent)Albert Vielfaure (L) 1807
- Stan Bisson (PC) 860

Logan:

- (incumbent)Lemuel Harris (NDP) 1975
- Wally Fox-Decent (PC) 1657
- W.M. Suystun (L) 1019

Minnedosa:

- (incumbent)Walter Weir (PC) 2136
- Don McNabb (L) 1615
- Gilbert V. Hutton (SC) 774
- John Lee (NDP) 648

1966 Manitoba general election: Morris
Party	Candidate	Votes	%	±%
Progressive Conservative	Harry Shewman	1,518	47.80	-0.92
Liberal	Bruce MacKenzie	1,288	40.55	7.27
New Democratic	William T. Loftus	370	11.65	–
Total valid votes		3,176	–	–
Rejected		33	–	
Eligible voters / Turnout		5,275	60.83	-3.72
Source(s) Source: Manitoba. Chief Electoral Officer (1999). Statement of Votes for the 37th Provincial General Election, September 21, 1999 (PDF) (Report). Winnipeg: Elections Manitoba.

Osborne:

- (incumbent)Obie Baizley (PC) 3363
- Bob Murdoch (NDP) 2189
- Howard Loewen (L) 2141

Pembina:

- (incumbent)Carolyne Morrison (PC) 2056
- Vernon Spangelo (L) 1545
- Frederick Hamm (SC) 878
- Robert Wallcraft (NDP) 129

Portage la Prairie:

- (incumbent)Gordon Johnston (L) 2726
- John Christianson (PC) 1991
- Sybil Barnett (NDP) 312

Radisson:

- (incumbent)Russell Paulley (NDP) 7114
- Joseph Guay (L) 4905
- Nelson McLean (PC) 2561

Rhineland:

- (incumbent)Jacob Froese (SC) 1676
- Bruce Gunn (PC) 1324
- Alf Loewen (L) 696

River Heights:

- Sidney Spivak (PC) 5325
- Scott Wright (L) 4083
- Lionel Orlikow (NDP) 826

Roblin:

- Wally McKenzie (PC) 1798
- Joseph Perchaluk (NDP) 1583
- Jack Mitchell (L) 863

Rock Lake:

- Henry Einarson (PC) 1835
- Ronald Gardiner (L) 1691
- Jacob Harms (SC) 505
- Ernest Sloane (NDP) 333

Rockwood-Iberville:

- Harry Enns (PC) 2091
- Douglas Trick (L) 1429
- Armand De Ryck (NDP) 804
- Wilmer Antonius (SC) 228

Rupertsland:

- (incumbent)Joseph Jeannotte (PC) 1866
- Jean Allard (L) 953
- Douglas MacLachlan (NDP) 363

St. Boniface:

- (incumbent)Laurent Desjardins (L) 4040
- Remi Lafreniere (PC) 1750
- Maurice Paul (NDP) 1033

St. George:

- (incumbent)Elman Guttormson (L) 2009
- Arthur Schwartz (PC) 1418
- Stanley Burdett (NDP) 357

St. James:

- (incumbent)Douglas Stanes (PC) 3034
- Lloyd Axworthy (L) 2244
- Jim Rose (NDP) 1487

St. Johns:

- (incumbent)Saul Cherniack (NDP) 2427
- Dan Zaharia (PC) 1215
- Harry Meronek (L) 970
- Don Currie (Comm) 326

St. Matthews:

- Robert Steen (PC) 2941
- Andrew Robertson (NDP) 1950
- Donald Cook (L) 1922

St. Vital:

- Donald Craik (PC) 4432
- Douglas Honeyman (L) 2927
- William Hutton (NDP) 2310

Ste. Rose:

- (incumbent)Gildas Molgat (L) 2410
- Michael Posmituck (PC) 1187
- David Duning (SC) 275
- Harry Shafransky (NDP) 86

Selkirk:

- (incumbent)Thomas Hillhouse (L) 1832
- Sydney Sarbitt (PC) 1792
- Alan Cooper (NDP) 876
- Jens Magnusson (SC) 227

Seven Oaks:

- Saul Miller (NDP) 5295
- Nathan Nurgitz (PC) 2596
- Melvin Fenson (L) 2010

Souris-Lansdowne:

- (incumbent)Malcolm McKellar (PC) 1919
- Frank Ellis (L) 1556
- Margaret Gray (SC) 387
- Irene Bauman (NDP) 238

Springfield:

- (incumbent)Fred Klym (PC) 1697
- Richard Loeb (NDP) 1274
- William Lucko (L) 1113

Swan River:

- (incumbent)James Bilton (PC) 1591
- Gerald Webb (SC) 1185
- Claude Dunbar (L) 793
- George Higgs (NDP) 602

The Pas:

- (incumbent)John Carroll (PC) 2278
- Calvin Gibson (L) 1769
- Glen Allen (NDP) 288

Turtle Mountain:

- Edward Dow (L) 2149
- (incumbent)Peter J. McDonald (PC) 2144
- Peter Sawatsky (SC) 690
- Selwyn Burrows (NDP) 141

Virden:

- (incumbent)Donald Morris McGregor (PC) 2092
- Roland Tolton (L) 1245
- Donald Rowan (SC) 743
- Vernon Mazawasicuna (NDP) 256

Wellington:

- Philip Petursson (NDP) 3153
- (incumbent)Richard Seaborn (PC) 2447
- Gurzon Harvey (L) 1117

Winnipeg Centre:

- (incumbent)James Cowan (PC) 2982
- Ross White (L) 1917
- Donald Malinowski (NDP) 1434

1966 Manitoba general election: Wolseley
Party	Candidate	Votes	%	±%
Progressive Conservative	Dufferin Roblin	3,132	48.88	
Liberal	Julius Koteles	1,780	27.78	
New Democratic	Cecil Wood	1,495	23.33	
Total valid votes		6,407	100.00	
Rejected and discarded votes		45		
Turnout		6,452	55.52	
Electors on the lists		11,621		

=== Post-election changes ===
Note: These by-election results are taken from newspaper reports, and may not exactly match the official returns.

Gordon Beard (PC) became (Ind) in 1968.

Turtle Mountain (results overturned and seat declared vacant, January 30, 1968), March 4, 1968:

- Edward Dow (L) 2443
- Allan Rose (PC) 2240
- Peter Sawatsky (SC) 610

Four seats became vacant in 1968:

- Dufferin Roblin (PC, Wolseley) and Rod Clement (Lib, Birtle-Russell) resigned to seek election to the House of Commons of Canada in the 1968 Canadian general election. Both were unsuccessful.
- Gordon Beard (Ind, Churchill) resigned his seat after protesting that the government was not paying sufficient attention to issues affecting northern Manitoba.
- Harry Shewman (PC, Morris) died in office.

By-elections for all four ridings were called for February 20, 1969. The Progressive Conservative, Liberal, and New Democratic parties fielded candidates in all four ridings, and there was also an independent candidate in Churchill. The Social Credit Party intended to field a candidate in Morris, but ultimately did not do so.

Manitoba provincial by-election, February 20, 1969: Birtle-Russell
Party	Candidate	Votes	%	±%	Expenditures
Progressive Conservative	Harry Graham	2,117	46.46		$1,500.98
Liberal	Edward Shust	1,406	30.85	–	$2,476.39
New Democratic	Donald Kostesky	1,034	22.69		$1,248.00
Total valid votes		4,557	100		
Rejected and discarded votes		23			
Turnout		4,580	76.30		
Electors on the lists		6,003			

Manitoba provincial by-election, February 20, 1969: Churchill Resignation of Gordon Beard
Party	Candidate	Votes	%	±%	Expenditures
New Democratic	Joseph Borowski	2,637	32.67		$2,350.33
Independent	Blain Johnston	2,616	32.41		$3,733.76
Liberal	Garry Walsh	1,709	21.17	–	$6,242.87
Progressive Conservative	Michael Klewchuk	1,109	13.74		$7,346.47
Total valid votes		8,071	100		
Rejected and discarded votes		17			
Turnout		8,088	62.97		
Electors on the lists		12,845			

Manitoba provincial by-election, February 20, 1969: Morris (electoral district) Death of Harry Shewman
Party	Candidate	Votes	%	±%	Expenditures
Progressive Conservative	Warner Jorgenson	2,146	65.77	17.97	$966.85
Liberal	Ralph Rasmussen	841	25.77	-14.78	$526.56
New Democratic	William T. Loftus	276	8.46	-3.19	$770.61
Total valid votes		3,263	–	–	
Rejected		15	–		
Eligible voters / turnout		5,284	62.07	–	
Source(s) Source: Manitoba. Chief Electoral Officer (1999). Statement of Votes for the 37th Provincial General Election, September 21, 1999 (PDF) (Report). Winnipeg: Elections Manitoba.

Manitoba provincial by-election, February 20, 1969: Wolseley Resignation of Duff Roblin
Party	Candidate	Votes	%	±%	Expenditures
Progressive Conservative	Leonard Claydon	2,161	46.62		$2,640.69
Liberal	Julius Koteles	1,528	33.01	–	$10,753.19
New Democratic	Archie Stone	944	20.37		$1,423.50
Total valid votes		4,633	98.38		
Rejected and discarded votes		75	1.62		
Turnout		4,708	41.97		
Electors on the lists		11,217			

The results for Birtle-Russell, Morris and Wolseley are taken from the Winnipeg Free Press, 21 February 1969. The result from Churchill reflects the findings of a judicial review, and is taken from the Winnipeg Free Press, 19 March 1969.
