= Earl Dawson =

Canadian ice hockey administrator, politician and civil servant

Member of the Legislative Assembly of Manitoba for Hamiota
- In office June 23, 1966 – June 25, 1969
- Preceded by: Barry Strickland
- Succeeded by: Morris McGregor

Personal details
- Born: December 17, 1925 Saint Boniface, Manitoba, Canada
- Died: March 28, 1987 (aged 61) Winnipeg, Manitoba, Canada
- Party: Manitoba Liberal Party
- Education: École Provencher
- Occupation: Sport Canada administrator, politician, businessman
- Known for: Canadian Amateur Hockey Association and Manitoba Amateur Hockey Association president
- Awards: Manitoba Hockey Hall of Fame

Military service
- Allegiance: Canada
- Branch/service: Royal Canadian Air Force, Canadian Army
- Battles/wars: World War II

Earl Phillip Dawson (December 17, 1925 – March 28, 1987) was a Canadian ice hockey administrator, politician and civil servant. As president of the Manitoba Amateur Hockey Association, Dawson reversed the decline of hockey in rural Manitoba and spent more money per player to develop minor ice hockey than other Canadian provinces. As chairman of the Canadian Amateur Hockey Association (CAHA) rules committee, he established clinics for referee instructors to standardize interpretation of ice hockey rules. Elected vice-president of the CAHA in 1966, he served as president from 1969 to 1971. The International Ice Hockey Federation had approved a limited use of professionals at the 1970 Ice Hockey World Championships, but later reversed the decision when the International Olympic Committee objected. Dawson and the CAHA perceived this a double standard since the Europeans were believed to be state-sponsored professionals labelled as amateurs, and withdrew the Canada men's national ice hockey team from international competitions until it was allowed to use its best players.

Dawson faced internal issues from junior ice hockey teams in Western Canada who were upset with the imposed age limit and demanded greater financial compensation for players chosen in the National Hockey League Amateur Draft. The Western Canada Hockey League played outside of the CAHA's jurisdiction for two seasons, when Dawson negotiated a new deal that saw the league accept the age limit in exchange for increased financial compensation. Dawson oversaw the CAHA reorganize its executive to include vice-presidents for minor hockey, junior hockey and senior ice hockey to give each level of hockey a greater voice. He later announced that junior hockey would split into a two-tier system for the 1970–71 season. The Memorial Cup remained the championship for the top tier and junior hockey, and the CAHA established the Manitoba Centennial Cup for the second tier's championship. Dawson oversaw the transition of both the Memorial Cup and the Allan Cup's formats from an east-versus-west final into a round-robin involving league champions. He also led the CAHA into the product endorsement business, released a logo for the CAHA, and used the money generated to reinvest into hockey in Canada.

Dawson served with the Royal Canadian Air Force and the Canadian Army during World War II, then operated a dry cleaning business for 19 years in Rivers, Manitoba. He was extensively involved in community service groups, was a town councilor from 1957 to 1965, and represented the Hamiota electoral district as a Manitoba Liberal Party member from 1966 to 1969. Dawson wanted to use the 1967 Pan American Games and the Canadian Centennial events to boost recreation in Manitoba and improve local infrastructure. He sought to increase subsidies for rural students, to employ students locally and stop human capital flight. He argued that medicare laws in Manitoba discriminated against rural citizens, and wanted to reduce medical costs and increase their services. He also supported the development of local resources to relieve rural industries and businesses from tax burden.

Dawson served as a director for Sport Canada and the secretary of the Canada Games council from 1970 to 1987. He oversaw the Canada Fitness Award Program and supported the Junior Olympics program. He served as chairman of the 1975 World Junior Ice Hockey Championships hosted in Winnipeg which coincided with the Manitoba Centennial celebrations. He aimed to increase the level of competition in women's sport across the country, and implemented testing for doping in sport in the Canada Games in 1984. Dawson summarized his career by stating, "I just seem to be the kind of person who gets involved in controversy, be it in hockey or politics", and the Winnipeg Free Press concurred that he "had controversy as his constant companion". He was named Western Manitoba Sportsman of the Year by the Brandon Sun in 1964, and was posthumously inducted into the Manitoba Hockey Hall of Fame in 1995.

== Early life and community involvement ==
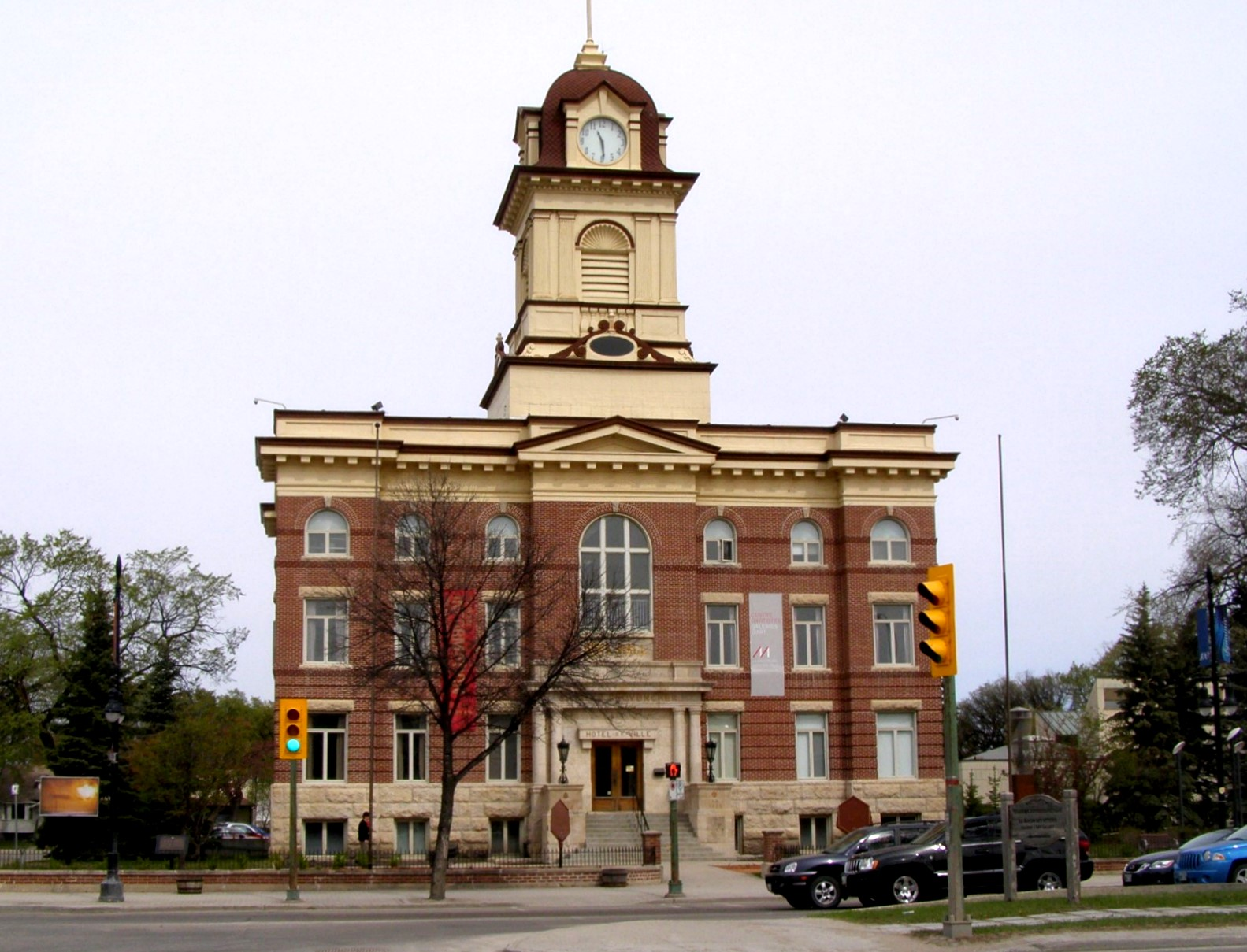
City Hall in St. Boniface, hometown of Dawson

Earl Phillip Dawson was born on December 17, 1925, in Saint Boniface, Winnipeg. He was the son of Thomas and Irene Dawson, and was educated at École Provencher. He contracted polio at age 12 which prevented him from playing ice hockey.

Dawson became a reserve officer in the Royal Canadian Air Force (RCAF), and served with both the RCAF and the Canadian Army during World War II. He married Madeline O'Callaghan on June 29, 1949, with whom he had four sons and one daughter.

Dawson moved to Rivers, Manitoba in 1951, where he operated a dry cleaning business for 19 years. He was a town councilor for Rivers from 1957 to 1965, and was president of the local chamber of commerce. He served as president of the local Royal Canadian Legion, and was the commanding officer of the Royal Canadian Air Cadets squadron in Rivers. He also served as president of the local Kiwanis Club, the Rivers Credit Union and the Rivers Liberal Association. He was chairman of the financial committee for the Immaculate Conception Church in Rivers, and was chairman of the board of governors for the local hockey arena.

== Manitoba Amateur Hockey Association ==
Dawson managed an intermediate level ice hockey team from Rivers during the 1952–53 playoffs, which was disqualified by the Manitoba Amateur Hockey Association (MAHA) for the use of illegal players. He became president of the Rivers Hockey Association in 1953 and served three consecutive terms until 1955. He was also invited to join the MAHA executive committee after expressing his grievances, and served as a convenor for the intermediate level from 1954 to 1957. He was elected second vice-president of the MAHA in October 1955, and was elected first vice-president of the MAHA in October 1957.

Dawson was elected president of the MAHA to succeed Curly Tyler in October 1958. The MAHA had its greatest registration to date and sought to reimburse teams in rural Manitoba for the cost of developing players lost to the Manitoba Junior Hockey League (MJHL) who in turn profited by selling players to professional teams. Dawson planned to promote and raise funds for minor ice hockey with a Minor Hockey Week in January 1959.

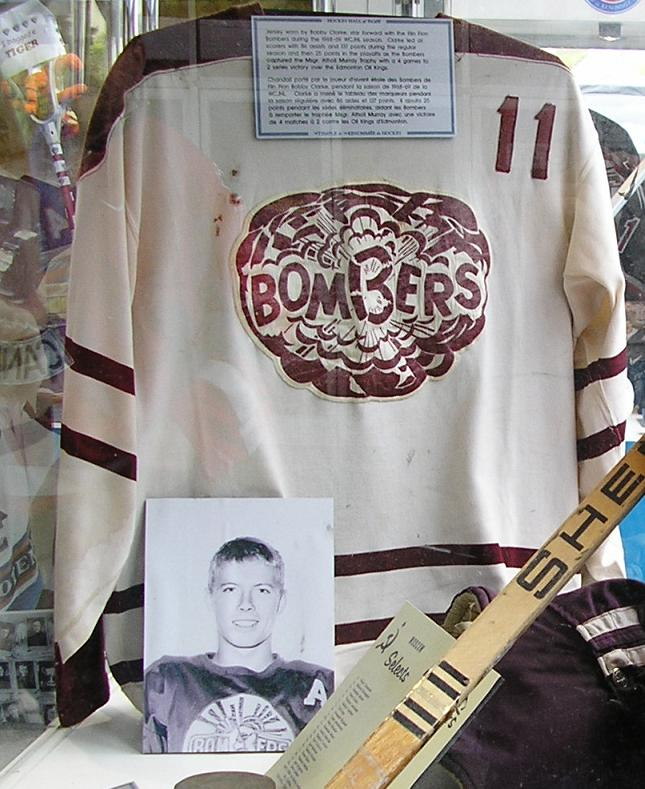
Dawson had multiple disputes with the Flin Flon Bombers (team jersey pictured) while he was president of the MAHA.

Dawson was re-elected president in October 1959. He sought a financial arrangement with the Saskatchewan Amateur Hockey Association (SAHA) if the Flin Flon Bombers were to affiliate with the Saskatchewan Junior Hockey League (SJHL) instead of the MJHL, and wanted to recuperate the MAHA's costs of developing minor hockey players and on-ice officials in Flin Flon that contributed to local talent. Without a suitable agreement in place to receive a portion of playoffs profits, the MAHA made a proposal at the 1960 Canadian Amateur Hockey Association (CAHA) general meeting for Flin Flon to be transferred to the SAHA. He also wanted consistent rules used in Western Canada that allowed replacement players for interprovincial playoffs, and was opposed to teams in the Alberta Amateur Hockey Association or Thunder Bay Amateur Hockey Association being given the advantage over the MAHA and SAHA.

The Allan Cup was the championship trophy for amateur senior ice hockey in Canada.

Dawson was re-elected president in October 1960. The MAHA reached an agreement with the SAHA and Dawson served an ultimatum to the Flin Flon Bombers to pay a flat rate of C$300 or be denied permission to play in the SJHL. He felt that the Winnipeg Warriors team had a negative impact on junior ice hockey in Winnipeg and spoke up against professional teams encroaching upon MAHA territory. After backlash from the media, Dawson clarified the comments to disagree that professional teams should have an exclusive zone to dictate operation of teams under CAHA jurisdiction. After the Winnipeg Maroons opted out the 1961 Allan Cup playoffs, Dawson allowed lower-level senior teams to compete since the MAHA wanted a provincial representative in the national playoffs. After the season, he renegotiated the MAHA's financial arrangement with the Brandon Wheat Kings to prevent a proposed to switch from the MJHL to the SJHL. He also wanted to see updates to the MAHA constitution to deal with modern problems, and set up a committee to oversee issues specific to hockey in rural Manitoba.

Dawson was re-elected president in October 1961. The MJHL hired a new promotional director and requested to use international ice hockey rules without body checking to begin the 1961–62 season as an effort to attract more spectators. Dawson approved the request, but CAHA president Jack Roxburgh ordered the MJHL to revert to standard Canadian rules. The MAHA allowed the Prince Albert Mintos of the SJHL to move to Dauphin, Manitoba after a fire ruined the team's arena in December 1961, and levied a fee of 10 per cent of ticket sales to cover lost revenue for the existing senior team in Dauphin. Despite the Flin Flon Bombers also playing in the SJHL and paying a flat fee, Dawson justified the higher fee for temporarily displacing an existing MAHA team in Dauphin.

Dawson was re-elected to a fifth term as president in October 1962. During his presidency, the MAHA had grown to be the country's third largest provincial association by registration and spent more per capita to develop minor ice hockey than other provinces in Canada. Journalist Laurie Artiss stated that the Rural Minor Hockey Council established by Dawson had succeeded in reversing the decline of hockey in rural Manitoba by enforcing geographical limits on where the bigger cities could claim players. The decision resulted in players staying in smaller towns and gave more children a chance to play locally.

Dawson completed his final term as president in October 1963. As the past-president he represented the MAHA at an arbitration committee in October 1964. His stance on teams playing out-of-province was confirmed when the CAHA ruled that the Flin Flon Bombers and Brandon Wheat Kings would turn over the majority of profits for their home games to the MAHA despite the teams playing in the SJHL.

== Canadian Amateur Hockey Association ==
Dawson became involved in national hockey during his tenure of president of the MAHA and served on several committees of the CAHA. He was secretary of the Western Canada intermediate senior hockey committee for three seasons, and sat on the CAHA leadership committee. He later became chairman of the rules committee and organized the first nationwide clinic for referee instructors in 1964 to standardize the interpretation of hockey rules across Canada.

=== Second vice-president ===
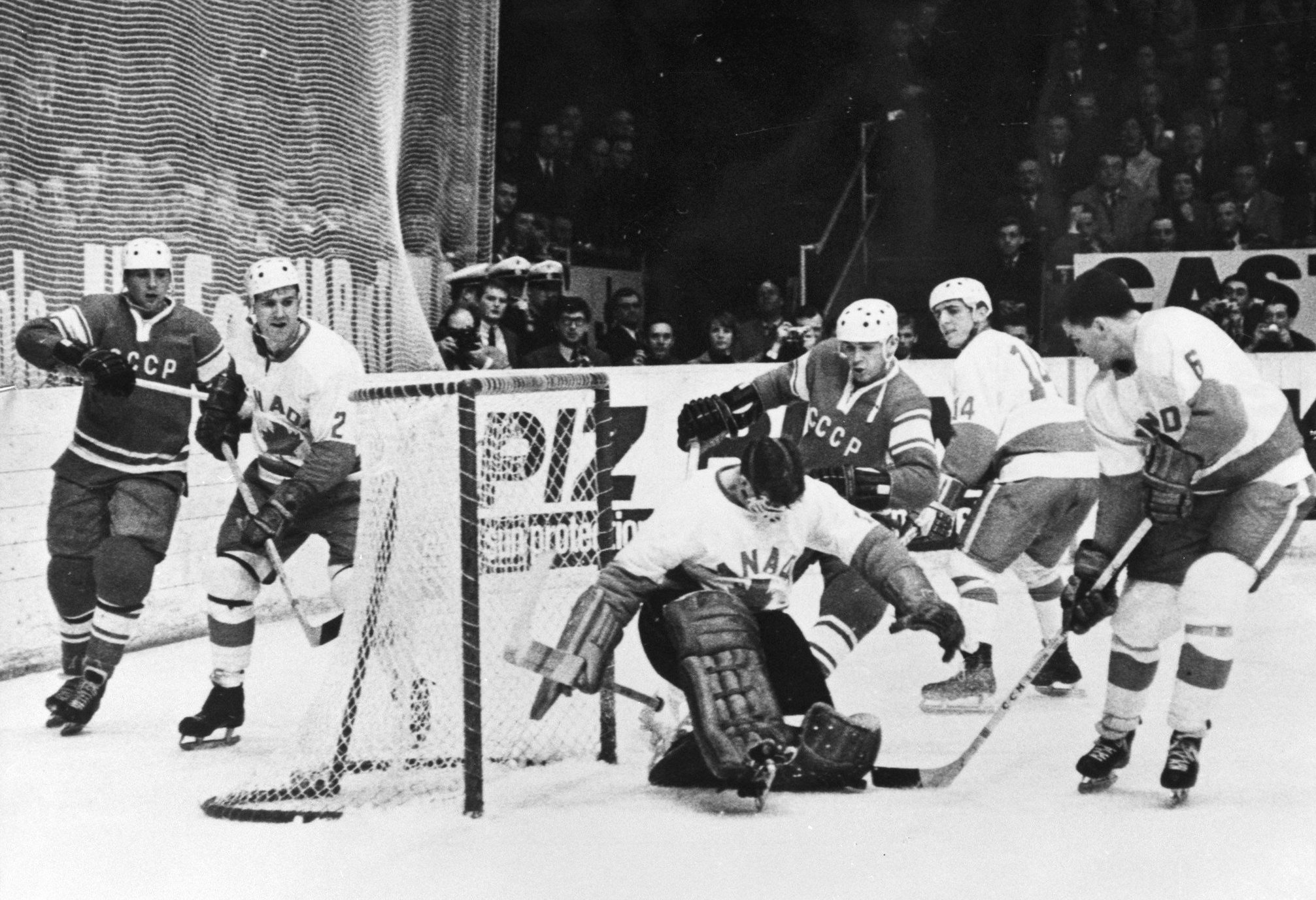
Canada versus the Soviet Union at the 1967 Ice Hockey World Championships

Dawson was elected second vice-president of the CAHA on May 28, 1966, serving under Fred Page as president. The Canadian Major Junior Hockey League was launched for the 1966–67 season, despite reservations by Dawson that the league was premature and too expensive. He advocated for the Brandon Wheat Kings to remain in the MJHL amid negotiations for top-level junior teams to leave their provincial associations and join the new league. He was named chairman of the minor hockey committee that oversaw promotions dedicated to the Canadian Centennial in 1967, and organized a Minor Hockey Week and the Midget Centennial Tournament. He also oversaw the Memorial Cup playoffs in Western Canada as vice-president.

In 1967, Dawson became chairman of the CAHA committee to oversee the Canada men's national ice hockey team. The CAHA approved establishing a second national team based in Ottawa in addition to the Winnipeg-based team. Both teams were expected to play international tours or exhibition games, and increase the number of players with international experience in advance of ice hockey at the 1968 Winter Olympics. Canada was subsequently awarded hosting duties of the 1970 Ice Hockey World Championships and Dawson sat on the planning committee. Dawson planned to continue the two national teams despite operating a deficit during the 1967–68 season.

=== First vice-president ===
Dawson was elected first vice-president of the CAHA in May 1968. Lloyd Pollock resigned as president in October 1968 due to business reasons, and Dawson became the acting president.

The CAHA had approved the concept of Hockey Canada in 1966, as a corporation with tax-free status to operate the Canadian national team. In December 1968, John Munro, the Minister of Health and Welfare, stated a federal task force was looking into establishing such a corporation, and Dawson felt that the government was taking credit for something which the CAHA had proposed. Dawson later suggested disbanding the national team program as it would not be financially viable without an annual $100,000 grant from the government. Munro announced a $200,000 contribution for operation of the national team in 1969.

Dawson arranged for the Soviet Union national ice hockey team to tour Canada in January 1969, but his relationship became strained with what he called "childish problems" by the Soviets. Frustrations grew when they arrived late for the first scheduled game on the tour which negated profits for the CAHA, and Dawson was reported as wanting to see discipline handed out by the International Ice Hockey Federation (IIHF) against the Soviets.

=== President ===
==== First term ====
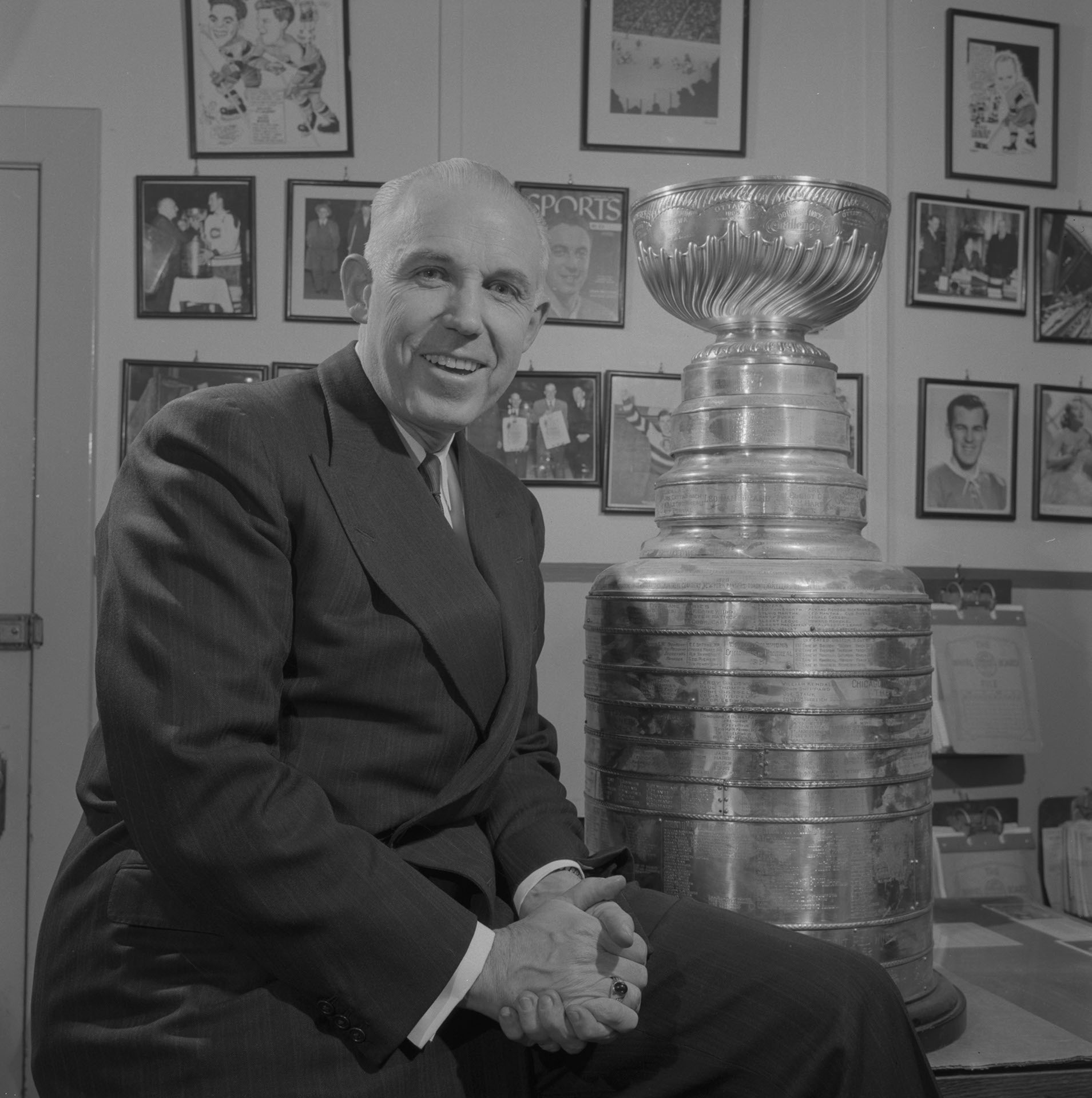
National Hockey League president Clarence Campbell

Dawson succeeded Lloyd Pollock as president at the CAHA executive meeting on January 27, 1969. When the transfer of control of the Canada men's national ice hockey team from the CAHA to Hockey Canada became imminent, Dawson sought a clear definition of the CAHA's responsibilities and did not want to compromise its authority over amateur hockey in Canada nor its membership within the IIHF. He also wanted to ensure that all players in Canada had the opportunity to play on the national team. The Hockey Canada board of governors was formed on February 24, 1969, with Dawson and Gordon Juckes named to represent the CAHA.

Dawson increased the number of annual executive meetings from two to three due to disagreements with National Hockey League (NHL) and increasing dissent from branches of the CAHA. Team owners in Western Canada were upset with the existing professional-amateur agreement between the CAHA and the NHL signed in 1968 and in effect until 1972. It stipulated the age limit in junior hockey at 20 years old before players would become the property of professional teams. The NHL declined to alter the age limit despite continued requests by Dawson and the CAHA. Dawson and the CAHA were also opposed to potential expansion into Canada by the American Hockey League, and asked NHL president Clarence Campbell to follow-up on press reports of rumoured farm teams in Montreal, Ottawa and Kingston.

Junior teams in Western Canada claimed that the lower age limit decreased its talent pool and negatively affect ticket sales. The teams wanted greater financial compensation for players lost to professional teams since their travel costs were greater than teams in Eastern Canada. The teams in the Canadian Major Junior Hockey League broke away from CAHA jurisdiction and formed the Western Canada Hockey League (WCHL) under the jurisdiction of the Canadian Hockey Association (CHA) led by Ron Butlin. The WCHL and Butlin were opposed to the CAHA's structure of elected officials who were not connected to any team but were determining hockey policies. Dawson and the CAHA responded by proposing committees to operate senior hockey, junior hockey and minor hockey.

==== Second term ====
Dawson was re-elected president in May 1969. The CAHA reorganized its executive to include vice-presidents for minor hockey, junior hockey and senior hockey respectively; and decided against unilateral action to change the junior age limits imposed by the professional-amateur agreement with the NHL. Hockey Canada took over control of the national team from the CAHA in June 1969, although Dawson committed the CAHA to arrange international exhibition tours for the team. The CAHA approved requests by the Yukon and the Northwest Territories to become branch members and began discussions to separate the territories from the jurisdiction of British Columbia and Alberta respectively.

===== International hockey =====
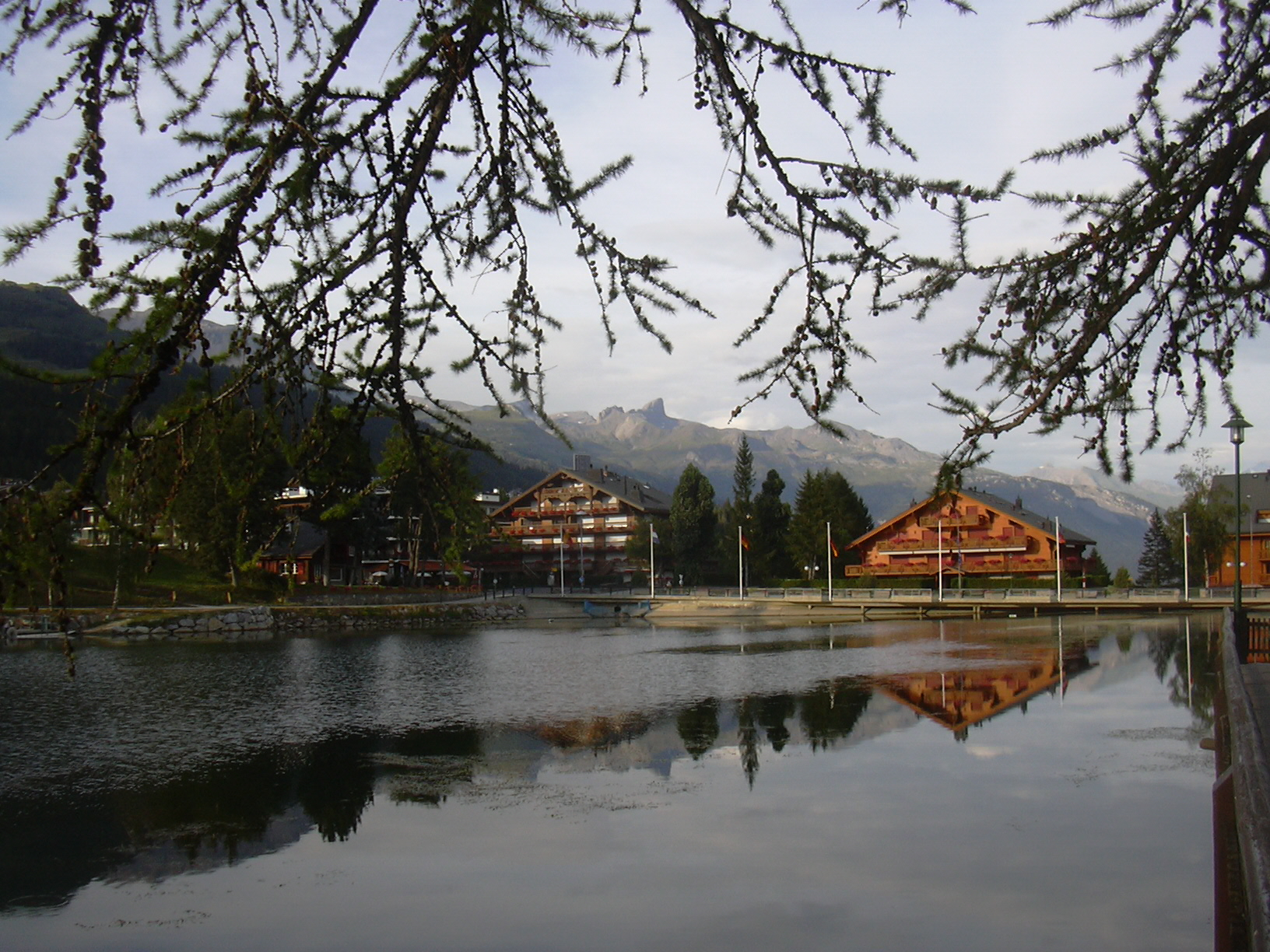
The Swiss town of Crans-sur-Sierre hosted the IIHF general meetings in 1969 and 1970.

Dawson attended the IIHF general meeting in July 1969, and lobbied for the open use of professionals at the Ice Hockey World Championships. He hoped to convince Europeans that they were competing against second-rate amateur talent from the United States and Canada, and that an open competition would be truly representative of the world's best hockey. The IIHF approved a CAHA proposal to extend the deadline to reinstate professionals as amateurs and be eligible for the World Championships, which had the potential to allow Canada access more talented players. Dawson felt the change was sufficient but Hockey Canada wanted to pursue open competition with unlimited use of professionals. Canada had not won the World Championships since 1961 and had never hosted the event. The unlimited use of professionals was seen as the best chance to return Canada to hockey supremacy.

The next day, the IIHF voted against the second CAHA proposal and open competition at the 1970 World Championships. The Canadian Press blamed IIHF president Bunny Ahearne for the decision since he was perceived to have influenced the vote when he stated that any team which played against professionals at the World Championships would be ineligible for the 1972 Winter Olympics as per International Olympic Committee (IOC) rules. Dawson then announced the cancellation Canadian tours to Sweden and Finland in response to the two countries not supporting the Canadian proposal for open competition.

Dawson went ahead with plans to host the 1970 World Championships and was in favour of using professionals reinstated as amateurs for international competition but noted that would require co-operation from all levels of professional hockey. The Soviet Union protested against the proposed schedule for the 1970 World Championships which had the team playing multiple instances of games on consecutive days. Dawson was confident that Soviet Union would play despite the threat of a boycott, and declined to make any changes to the schedule.

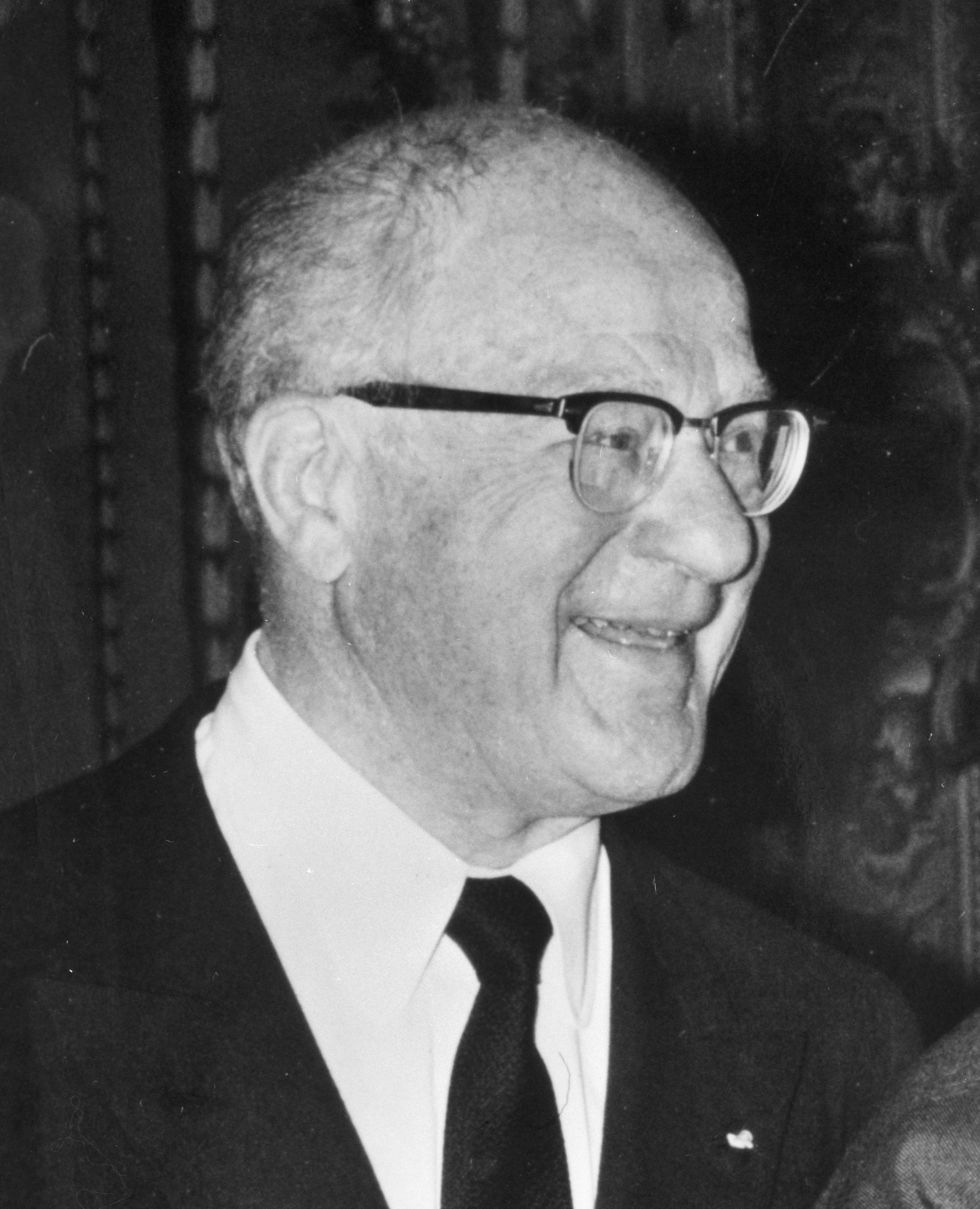
International Olympic Committee president Avery Brundage

IOC president Avery Brundage objected to the use of professionals at the World Championships and stated that any national team which played against professionals would be ineligible for hockey at the 1972 Winter Olympics. The IIHF called an emergency meeting for January 1970 to discuss the situation. Dawson attended the meeting and argued that national teams participating in Izvestia Trophy tournaments had played against professionals, but were still eligible for the Olympics and the same should apply to the World Championships. He also made the suggestion to consider the 1970 event an invitational tournament instead of a World Championships to avoid the wrath of the IOC, but the IIHF declined the notion. A vote was taken and five of the eight nations in the top division of the World Championships voted against the use of any professionals.

Canada perceived the situation to be a double standard in international hockey since players on European national teams were believed to be state-sponsored professionals labelled as amateurs. Dawson and the CAHA executive unanimously decided to take a stand against what they perceived as hypocrisy by European members of the IIHF.

"We quit. We will not return until the rules permit us to enter a team that is truly representative of Canadian hockey, so we can play our best players as all other countries do".

— Earl Dawson, January 4, 1970

Dawson withdrew the Canadian national team from international competitions against European hockey teams until Canada was allowed to use its best players. The CAHA retained its IIHF membership and hosting of the 1970 World Championships was given Sweden. Dawson also stated the CAHA would enter a team of amateurs at the 1972 Winter Olympics, then question the eligibility of all other hockey teams.

Dawson accused Ahearne of not doing enough to stand up to the opinions of Brundage. Dawson felt that Sweden and the Soviet Union combined to sabotage the Canadian attempt to host the 1970 World Championships, because Sweden wanted to host the event and the Soviets did not want to lose the gold medal. He also felt that even if the CAHA accepted not using any professionals, the Europeans would have found some other reason to prevent the tournament from being played in Canada. He also criticized the Soviets for refusing to play on consecutive days in Canada, but accepting the same schedule after the event was switched to Sweden.

Journalist Dallis Beck of the Winnipeg Free Press wrote that organizations involved in planning for the 1970 World Championships felt that Canada's decision to withdraw was correct in principle; but that the timing should have been earlier or after the event was completed, and that it denied the Canadian public of seeing a World Championships. Cabinet minister John Munro defended the decision to withdraw and stated that the Canadian Government agreed to underwrite the losses incurred by the CAHA due to refunds in excess of $400,000 in advance ticket sales.

Dawson met with Canadian Olympic Association officials later in January, and proposed a joint meeting with Ahearne and Brundage to seek a clearer definition of eligibility for the Olympics with respect to amateurism and professionalism. Dawson wanted to avoid compromising the 1976 Winter Olympics bid by Vancouver, but felt that it would be impossible for a Canadian hockey player not to have played against a professional at one time. Hockey Canada and the CAHA requested to use professionals in Group A of the 1971 Ice Hockey World Championships. The IIHF declined and instead invited the Canadian national team to play in Group B. Dawson declined and stated that Canada's stance on professionals at the World Championships remained unchanged.

===== Junior hockey =====
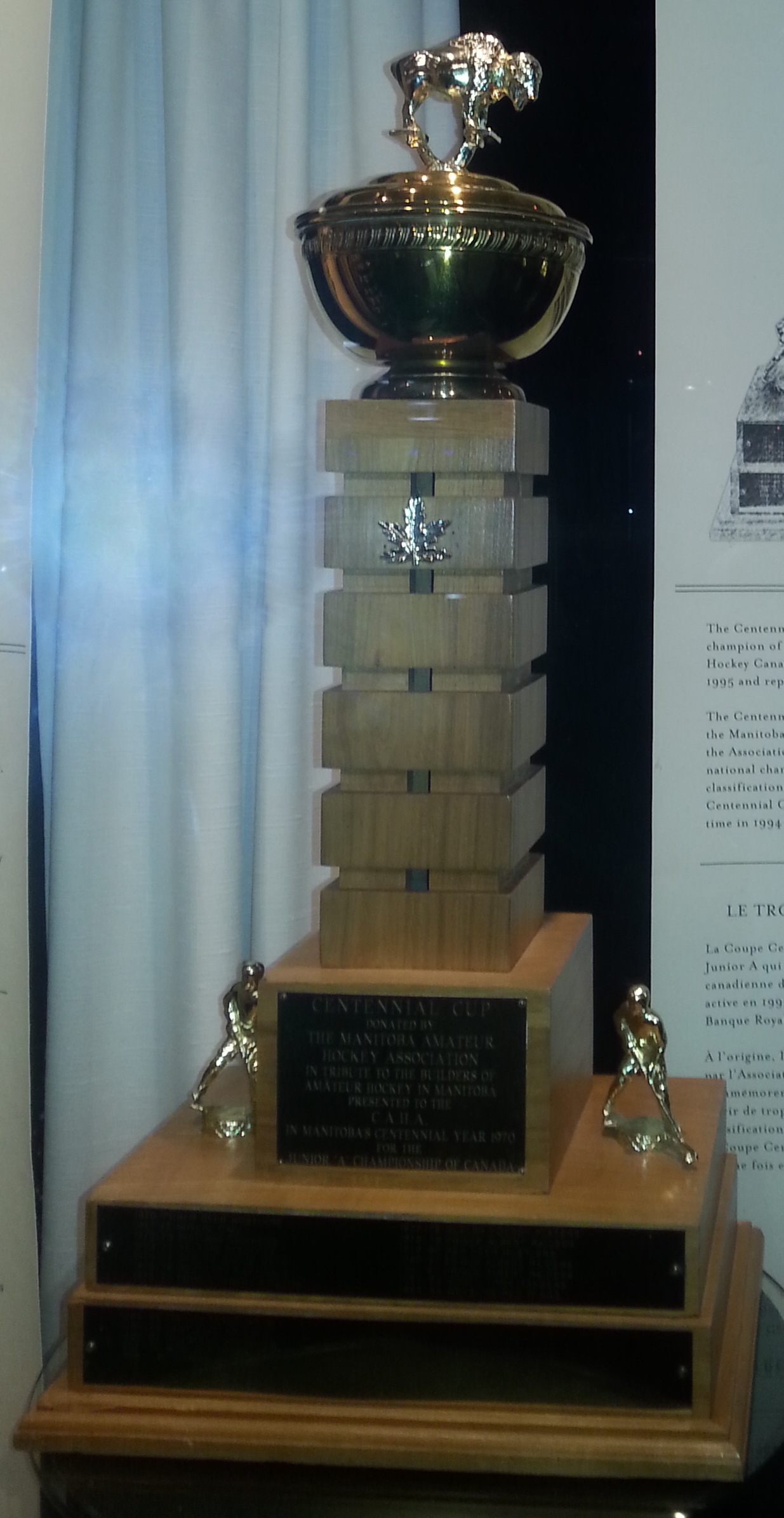
The Manitoba Centennial Cup was the championship trophy for the second tier of junior ice hockey in Canada.

Dawson proposed terms for the WCHL to rejoin the CAHA in August 1969, but he was doubtful that the WCHL would agree to a limit on the number of players it could import to the league or restrictions on moving teams from one city to another without CAHA approval. He terminated negotiations but welcomed individual teams to apply for CAHA membership. The WCHL took legal action seeking payments for players chosen in the NHL Amateur Draft, after Dawson stated that no money would be paid by the CAHA to teams not under its jurisdiction.

In October 1969, the MJHL executive called for the resignation of Dawson, due to not carrying out a "verbal commitment" in which he allegedly promised money to the league for the 1969–70 season, which Dawson denied. The MJHL felt it should have been consulted on the terms proposed to the WCHL for rejoining the CAHA, and that the WCHL jeopardized teams in the MJHL.

In March 1970, a meeting between the CAHA and the WCHL to resolve their differences ended after 15 minutes when Dawson reportedly wanted the WCHL to accept the same conditions as other junior leagues under CAHA jurisdiction. Butlin refused and made demands for increased financial concessions from the CAHA and more autonomy for player registrations. Dawson subsequently received a unanimous vote of confidence from CAHA executives, despite reports to the contrary from the WCHL.

In April 1970, Dawson announced that the CAHA was splitting junior hockey into a two-tier system for the 1970–71 season, which planned to have the Quebec Major Junior Hockey League (QMJHL), the Ontario Hockey Association Major Junior-A Series and the WCHL in tier-1 and other junior leagues in tier-2. The Memorial Cup became the national championship trophy for the tier-1 teams, and the CAHA established the Manitoba Centennial Cup as the national tier-2 junior championship in 1971. Dawson and fellow former MAHA president Bill Addison were named trustees of the Manitoba Centennial Cup.

==== Third term ====
Dawson was re-elected president in May 1970. He felt it was time that the CAHA caught up to other sports in the endorsement business, and to use the money generated to develop the game in Canada. The CAHA released a logo to identify the association and established CAHA Properties Limited to endorse products, which included recommended use of an endorsed hockey puck in amateur hockey across Canada.

Dawson recommended that Canada remain out of international competition until professionals became eligible for the World Championships, and that what he referred to "state-sponsored amateurs" were not allowed in the Olympic Games. He stated that Canada would not compete in a B-pool to qualify for the Olympics. He also stated there would be no exchange visits between Canada and Europe, but did not rule out competitions versus the United States men's national ice hockey team. He attended the 1971 Ice Hockey World Championships and met with the Soviets, Swedes and IIHF executives in an effort to host an international tournament using professionals. He was committed to a best-on-best tournament and opposed a recommendation by Alberta Golden Bears coach Clare Drake to have a university all-star team represent Canada internationally.

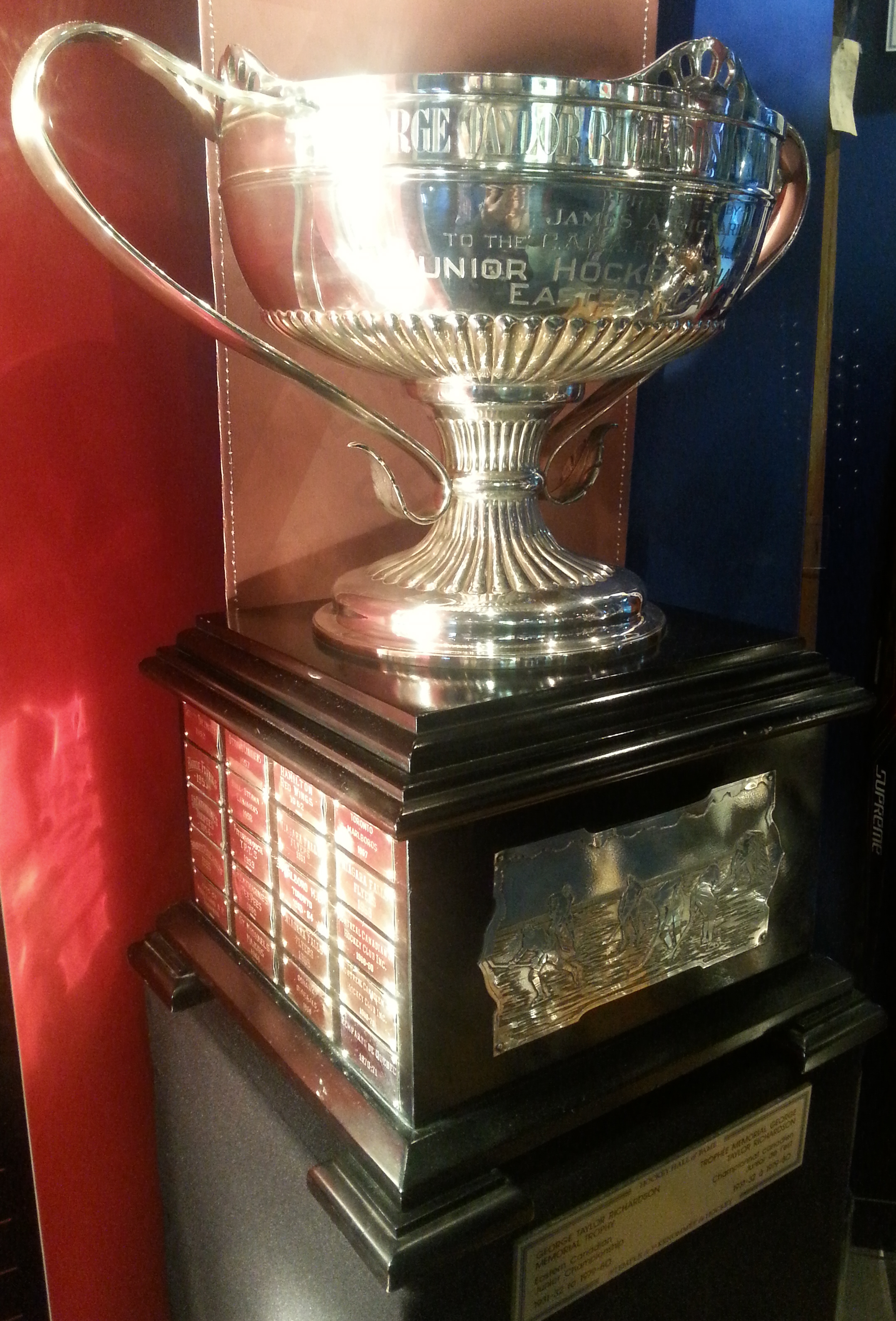
The George Richardson Memorial Trophy was the championship trophy for junior ice hockey in Eastern Canada.

The CAHA considered a proposal to restructure the playoffs for the Allan Cup from an east versus west final into a tournament format based in one city among the country's regional champions. Dawson felt that the CAHA was perceived as focused on junior hockey and neglecting senior hockey. He wanted to introduce private sponsorships for the national finals to generate profits which could be used to cover travel expenses for six to eight regional champion teams. The CAHA experimented with the Western Canada senior hockey final as a four-team round-robin among league champions instead of a knockout draw. Dawson stated that if the experiment was successful, the same would be done for Eastern Canada the following year. Despite criticism by senior hockey teams that it was unfair to their hometown fans to travel much further to attend the games, the concept was financially promising.

Dawson announced on June 24, 1970, that the CAHA and the WCHL signed a two-year agreement which included 14 clauses to reunite the organizations. The WCHL became recognized as the only tier-1 league in Western Canada and qualified for an automatic berth the Memorial Cup final. The WCHL was allowed four over-age players in the upcoming season, but was reduced to two thereafter. The WCHL agreed to abide by the CAHA's professional-amateur agreement with the NHL, and was entitled to fees paid per player chosen in the NHL Amateur Draft and $100,000 in development grants for the 1970–71 season. The WCHL agreed not to expand or relocate a team without approval of the CAHA, and was given direct representation on the CAHA's junior council. Dawson later threatened to have the WCHL expelled when it broke several terms in the agreement; specifically the number of over-age players and importing players from the Ontario Hockey Association (OHA). Further disagreement arose when WCHL teams drafted players from a tier-2 league, and Dawson ruled that the players must be either released or transferred according to CAHA by-laws.

Dawson faced escalating tensions which threatened to cancel the 1971 Memorial Cup and interrupted the George Richardson Memorial Trophy finals for the Eastern Canada junior hockey championship. After five games, the Quebec Remparts led the best-of-seven series by three games to two versus the St. Catharines Black Hawks. The players on St. Catharines refused to play game six of the series in Quebec City due to an angry mob atmosphere and violence encountered in game four in Quebec City, and due to threats from the Front de libération du Québec made against their best player, Marcel Dionne. The Remparts refused to play game six at a neutral site and Remparts executives assured Dawson that adequate police protection would be provided. Dawson declared the series forfeited when he received a written statement that St. Catharines would not play in Quebec City. No decision had been made on whether the 1971 Memorial Cup would be contested since teams in Eastern Canada disagreed with the use of four over-age players by the WCHL teams, and Western Canada teams receiving $10,000 in travel expenses compared to $5,000 in the east. The Edmonton Oil Kings became the Western Canada junior champions without any over-age players on their roster, and challenged the Remparts for the Memorial Cup. Dawson arranged a shortened best-of-three series for the 1971 Memorial Cup, with all games played in Quebec City.

=== Past-president ===
The Memorial Cup was the championship trophy for junior ice hockey in Canada.

Dawson declined to accept a fourth term as president and was succeeded by Joe Kryczka in May 1971. Dawson summarized his time as president in an interview with the Winnipeg Free Press by stating, "I just seem to be the kind of person who gets involved in controversy, be it in hockey or politics". He advocated for more full-time employees within the CAHA since it had too big for volunteers, and felt it should be operated by a commissioner with more authority. He also felt that the CAHA had made its point to the IIHF and that it was time to reconsider international games. The CAHA subsequently voted to allow Canadian hockey teams to enter any international competition except for the Olympics or World Championships.

Dawson served as chairman of the 1972 Memorial Cup playoffs. The format for the finals was changed from an Eastern Canada versus Western Canada final, into a round-robin format involving the tier-1 junior champions of the WCHL, the OHA and the QMJHL. Coaches of the three league champions were opposed to the new format, and felt that a short series put extra pressure on players and lacked the environment of a home game during the playoffs. Despite the initial criticism, the new format became financially viable and was retained until the 1983 Memorial Cup when a fourth team was added.

== Manitoba legislator ==
On December 1, 1965, Dawson was nominated as the Manitoba Liberal Party candidate for the Hamiota riding in the upcoming 1966 Manitoba general election. He was elected to the 28th Manitoba Legislature with 2,194 votes, compared to 2,043 for the incumbent Conservative Party candidate Barry Strickland. In his first speech as a member of the legislative assembly, Dawson defended local industries in Rivers and spoke against the potential decommissioning of CFB Rivers. Shortly into his time in the legislature, he was quoted in the Hansard as saying, "I believe that at 18 years of age a young person is twice as clever as any person in this House was at 18, when he was 18".

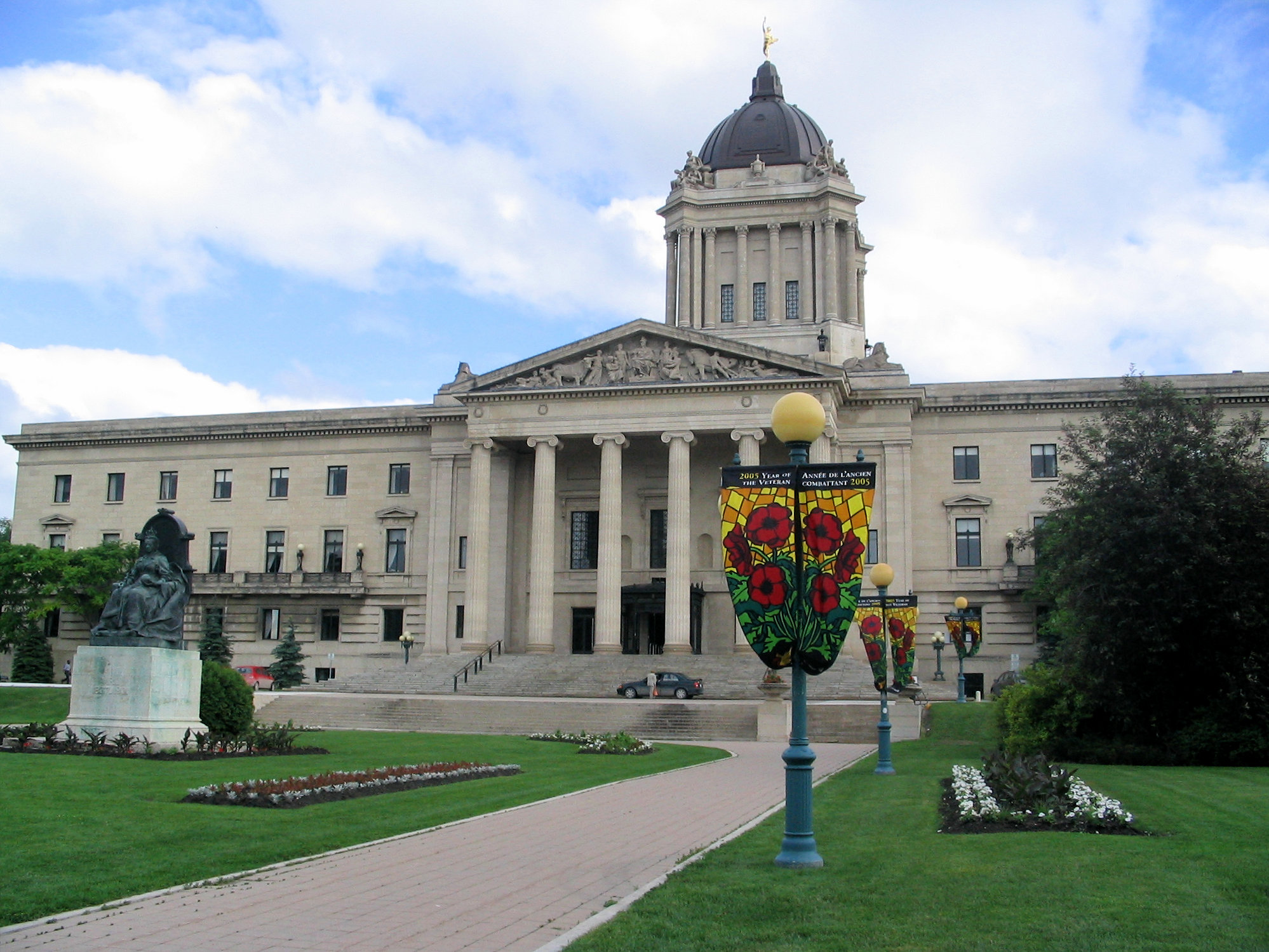
Manitoba Legislature building in Winnipeg

Dawson criticized the Fitness and Amateur Sport Department leadership, and stated that Manitoba was far behind in taking advantage of federal government subsidies compared to Saskatchewan and Alberta, and was failing to keep Manitoba's physical education students employed locally in recreational programs. He also sought for Manitoba to retain skilled professionals trained at the province's expense and to stop losses due to human capital flight. He supported legislation in 1967 to allow for languages other than English to be taught in Manitoba schools. He also sought increased subsidies for rural students attending college or university in big cities due to additional costs of travel, room and board, and stated that rural students paid twice as much as an urban student.

Manitoba hosted the 1967 Pan American Games and arranged events for the 1967 Canadian Centennial. When Sterling Lyon, the Minister of Tourism and Recreation, forecasted a record-high year for tourism, Dawson noted that Dominion Bureau of Statistics data showed that Manitoba received only 3 per cent of national tourism dollars. Dawson wanted to use the 1967 events to boost recreation in Manitoba, and proposed legislation for low-interest loans to communities for installation of artificial ice in hockey and curling rinks. He stated that similar legislation existed in Ontario and it had positively impacted ice sports.

When the 1967 medicare bill was introduced by the government it covered services by an ophthalmologist, but not an optometrist. Dawson argued that the government was discriminating against smaller towns which did not have an ophthalmologist by excluding coverage. He recommended combining hospitals and medicare into the same administration to save money and increase services. He also argued for more availability of doctors to provide services, and that premiums being too expensive for the average income in Manitoba. He wanted to implement ability-to-pay options for people with varying income such as farmers.

Dawson criticized the 45 per cent increase in education taxes on agricultural lands after reassessments of property values in March 1968. He felt that mineral, timber and agricultural resources were underdeveloped, and advocated for cattle raising similar to Alberta and Saskatchewan. He sought for changes in the Manitoba Development Fund for these causes and to relieve rural industries and businesses from tax burden. He also sat as a member on a special committee to investigate legislation on the sale and use of farm machinery and repairs in Manitoba, and legislation for artificial insemination of livestock under the Animal Husbandry Act.

Dawson was mentioned as a possible replacement for Gildas Molgat, who resigned as leader of the Manitoba Liberal Party in March 1969. Prior to the 1969 Manitoba general election, Dawson's riding of Hamiota was dissolved when boundaries were redistributed. He was nominated as the Liberal Party candidate in the riding of Virden against its Conservative Party incumbent Morris McGregor. Dawson was defeated with 1,571 votes compared to 2,161 votes for McGregor.

== National sports and later life ==
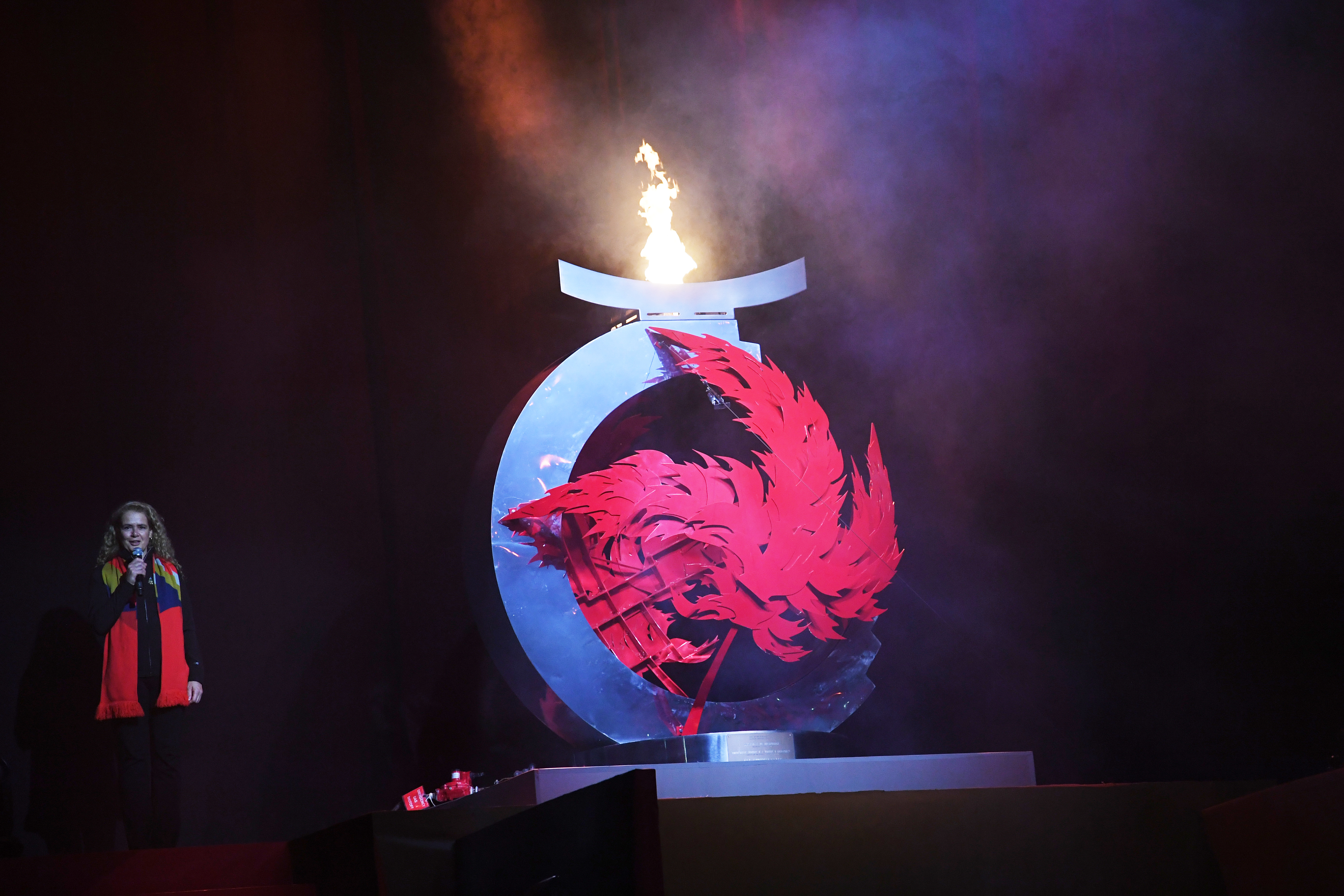
Canada Games opening ceremony

Dawson became a civil servant in April 1970, when he was hired as a part-time consultant and liaison by the Fitness and Amateur Sport Directorate of Canada working under national director Lou Lefaive. Dawson went on to serve for 17 years as a full-time national sport director and secretary of the Canada Games council.

In July 1970, the CAHA closed its Winnipeg office which had operated for three years and relocated to Ottawa. The new office was in the same building as the Fitness and Amateur Sport Directorate of Canada, and Dawson stated that the CAHA would spend $40,000 less per year and take advantage of the federal funding project for amateur sports announced by John Munro.

The Directorate of Fitness and Amateur Sport was split into Sport Canada and Recreation Canada in 1971, to oversee competitive and recreational aspects of sport. Dawson oversaw funding programs to assist athletes and promote amateur sports, which included the Canada Fitness Award Program at the 1972 Provincial Exhibition of Manitoba, and grants to communities of First Nations in Canada to operate recreational programs.

Dawson's role within Sport Canada included serving on the Hockey Canada board of directors, and supporting Canada's Junior Olympics program. He also sat on the committee for the Master Plan for Sport led by the Manitoba Sports Federation, and represented the Government of Canada on the board of directors for the 1974 Manitoba Games. He served as chairman of the 1975 World Junior Ice Hockey Championships hosted in Winnipeg, which coincided with the Manitoba Centennial celebrations.

Dawson was relocated to the Recreation and Sport Canada offices in Ottawa in January 1976 and focused on developing the Canada Summer and Winter Games. The Winnipeg office was reopened in March 1978, and Dawson was assigned to oversee programs in Manitoba and Saskatchewan while remaining a senior consultant to Ottawa.

Dawson was the federal liaison and advisor for the 1979 Canada Winter Games in Brandon, Manitoba, and felt the event to be the biggest Canada Games to date. He had wanted to bring to games to Brandon since 1973, and was hopeful for government investment to create an infrastructure legacy project in his home province. The government contributed $3.5 million towards permanent facilities.

Dawson attempted to level the playing for hockey at the 1979 Canada Winter Games, and negotiated different rules of player eligibility for each provincial amateur hockey association. Despite criticism by coaches for the rules being difficult to understand, he felt changes were necessary since some region of Canada had a limited number of players available.

Sport Canada wanted to increase the level of competition in women's sport across the country, and Dawson introduced women's team handball and softball at the 1981 Canada Summer Games in Thunder Bay, Ontario. He arranged talks with provincial sports bodies in 1983 to decide on the future of the Canada Games amid disagreements on whether events should be for amateurs or to develop elite athletes for international sports. He implemented testing for doping in sport in the Canada Games in 1984, and planned for reductions in the number of sports by the 1989 Canada Summer Games.

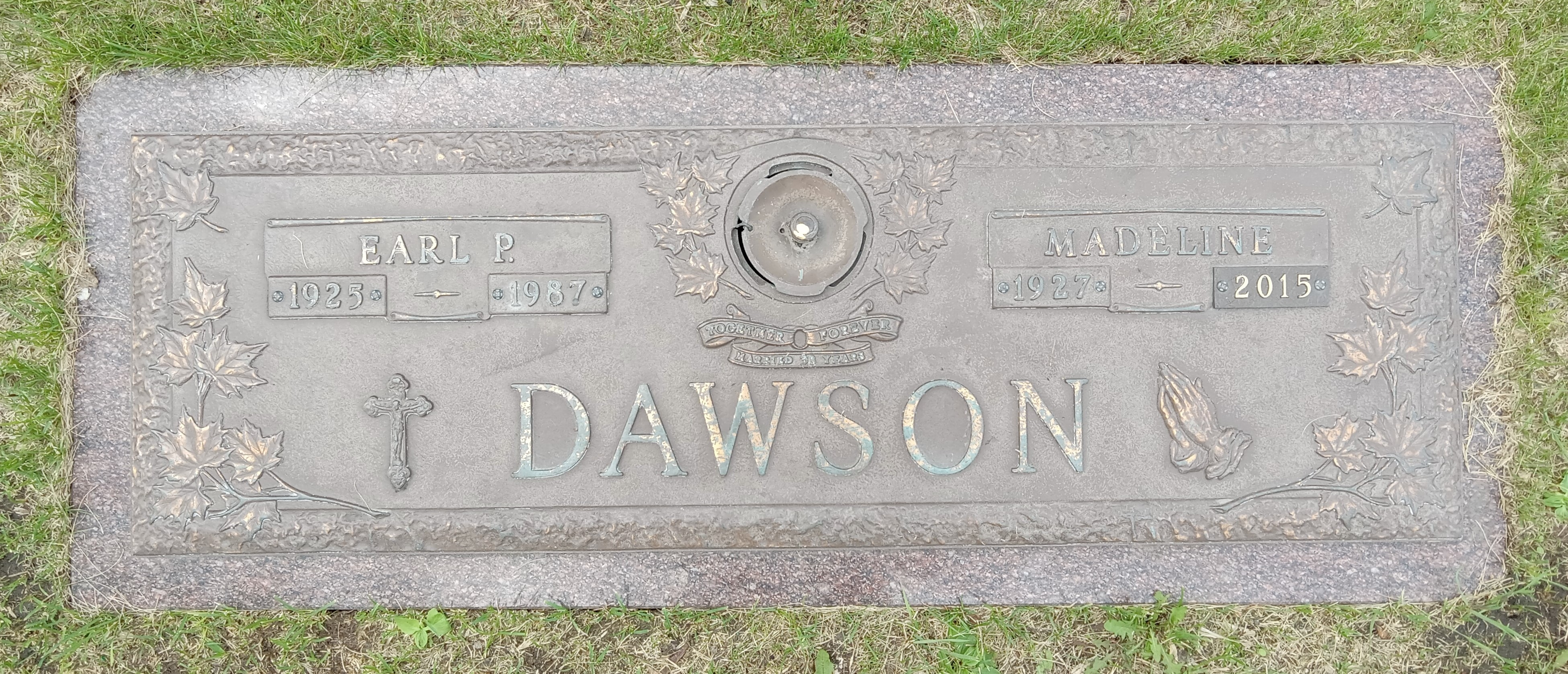
Dawson's grave marker

Dawson died from lung cancer at home in Winnipeg on March 28, 1987, after a year-long illness. He was interred at Glen Eden Memorial Garden in West St. Paul, Manitoba.

== Honours and awards ==
At the 1963 CAHA awards banquet, Dawson was named an honorary deputy mayor of Brandon, Manitoba, by its mayor S. A. Magnacca. In January 1964, Dawson was named Western Manitoba Sportsman of the Year by the Brandon Sun and a recipient of the H. L. Crawford Memorial Trophy.

Dawson received a citation award from the Amateur Hockey Association of the United States in 1970, for contributions to international ice hockey. In the same year, he was awarded a Manitoba Centennial medal by the Manitoba Historical Society.

Dawson was appointed a life member of the CAHA in May 1973. He was posthumously inducted into the Manitoba Hockey Hall of Fame in 1995.

== Legacy ==
Howard Pawley, the Premier of Manitoba, spoke in memory of Dawson during a sitting of the 33rd Manitoba Legislature on May 15, 1987. Pawley stated that, "Dawson served his constituents' interests well, through tireless hours of work on behalf of groups and individuals who sought his assistance and received it in an unstinting way". Gary Filmon, the Leader of the Opposition said that, "because of Dawson's commitment to amateur sport, Hamiota has always been a hot bed of sporting activity and has produced many athletes of national calibre". Fellow MLA Harry Enns felt that redistribution of electoral districts shortened Dawson's political career, and that "Dawson was an aggressive member, and no doubt would have excelled, had political fate been kinder to him". Other tributes came from Sharon Carstairs, Jim Ernst, and Jim Downey, before the assembly observed a moment of silence.

The Winnipeg Free Press stated that, Dawson was "remembered as a pleasant, outgoing personality who had controversy as his constant companion". Journalist Laurie Artiss credited Dawson for his sincerity and leadership, and for being stern but earning respect.

Dawson is the namesake of two honours given by the MAHA. The Earl Dawson Award was established in 1986, and is given for "outstanding contribution toward the development of hockey in Manitoba". The Earl Dawson Shield is awarded to the team that wins the MAHA Pee-Wee division championship. He is also the namesake of the Earl Dawson Award given by the Winnipeg office of the Canadian Cancer Society.

== Sources ==
- Lapp, Richard M.; Macaulay, Alec (1997). The Memorial Cup: Canada's National Junior Hockey Championship. Madeira Park, British Columbia: Harbour Publishing. ISBN 1-55017-170-4.
- Willes, Ed (2007). Gretzky to Lemieux: The Story of the 1987 Canada Cup. Toronto, Ontario, Canada: McClelland & Stewart Ltd. ISBN 978-0-7710-8942-8 – via Google Books.
- Debates and Proceedings: Legislative Assembly of Manitoba (PDF), 28th Legislature Hansard, vol. XV (32 ed.), Winnipeg, Manitoba: Government of Manitoba, March 26, 1969
- Debates and Proceedings: Legislative Assembly of Manitoba (PDF), 33rd Legislature Hansard, vol. XX (21 ed.), Winnipeg, Manitoba: Government of Manitoba, May 15, 1987
- Oliver, Greg (2017). Father Bauer and the Great Experiment: The Genesis of Canadian Olympic Hockey. Toronto, Ontario: ECW Press. ISBN 978-1-77041-249-1.
- McKinley, Michael (2014). It's Our Game: Celebrating 100 Years Of Hockey Canada. Toronto, Ontario: Viking Press. ISBN 978-0-670-06817-3.
- Ferguson, Bob (2005). Who's Who in Canadian Sport, Volume 4. Markham, Ontario: Fitzhenry & Whiteside Ltd. ISBN 1-55041-855-6.
