= Walter McDonald (politician) =

Canadian politician

Walter Clifton McDonald (March 16, 1903 in Roland, Manitoba – November 7, 1999) was a politician in Manitoba, Canada. He served in the Legislative Assembly of Manitoba as a Liberal-Progressive from 1949 to 1959.

Born to a wealthy land-owning family, the son of John Albert McDonald and Alice Grace Carr, McDonald was educated in Roland and at Wesley College in Winnipeg, Manitoba. He received a Bachelor of Arts degree in 1925, and worked in insurance and real estate. McDonald later served on the Board of Regents for United College in Winnipeg. He was also active in freemasonry, and became Grant Master of the Grand Lodge of Manitoba in 1948-49. He became a thirty-third degree mason in 1955. In 1930, he married Jean McKay. They had five children.

He was first elected to the Manitoba legislature in the 1949 provincial election, defeating Independent Progressive Conservative G.R. Muir by 101 votes in the constituency of Dufferin. He served as a backbench supporter of Douglas Campbell's government, and was re-elected by an increased majority in the 1953 election.

The Liberal-Progressives lost power to the Progressive Conservatives following the 1958 election, though McDonald retained his seat over Tory candidate William Homer Hamilton by 73 votes. The following year, he lost to Hamilton by 154 votes in the 1959 provincial election.

McDonald served as Sovereign Grand Commander of Canada's Scottish Rite of Freemasonry from 1976 to 1979. He continued operating his insurance business until 1986.

He died in Roland at the age of 96.
