= William Hutton (Manitoba politician) =

Canadian politician and Anglican priest (1929–2022)

The Rev. William John Hutton (30 January 1929 - 6 June 2022) was a clergyman, community activist and former politician in Manitoba, Canada. He was one of the last members of the Metropolitan Council of Greater Winnipeg, serving from 1969 until its dissolution at the end of 1971.

== Clergyman ==
Hutton was ordained as a priest in the Anglican Church of Canada in the 1960s, and worked as a high school guidance counsellor in the same period. He later co-founded the Jocelyn House for the terminally ill, and has been an honorary assistant at Winnipeg's St. Michael and All Angels Church for many years.

== Politician ==
Hutton was a candidate of the New Democratic Party of Manitoba (NDP) in the 1966 provincial election, and finished third against Progressive Conservative candidate Donald Craik in the central Winnipeg division of St. Vital. He was later the federal New Democratic Party's candidate for Winnipeg South in the 1968 Canadian general election, and placed third against Liberal James Richardson. He sought the provincial NDP's nomination for a 1971 by-election in St. Vital, but lost to Jim Walding.

Hutton was elected to the Metropolitan Council of Greater Winnipeg in the 1968 Winnipeg election, winning as an NDP candidate in the ninth ward. Veteran NDP politician Lloyd Stinson described Hutton's victory as unexpected, and described Hutton as "young, enthusiastic and controversial". He ran for mayor of the unified city of Winnipeg in the 1971 municipal election, but finished a distant third against Stephen Juba.

Hutton was a vocal opponent of the Manitoba's government decision to establish official English-French bilingualism in the early 1980s. He argued that this would not reflect Manitoba's multicultural status, and would instead create "a lopsided bicultural province, where on one side of the coin there exists a small, powerful, monolithic French ethnolinguistic community and on the other side a heterogeneous, multicultural polyglot collection of assorted ethnic and linguistic communities". Hutton further argued that entrenching French-language services would encourage cultural and political separatism, and that he opposed it in the same way that he opposed the Parti Québécois's campaign for an independent Quebec. Unlike some other opponents of bilingualism, Hutton was himself fluent in French and supported a strong francophone presence within Canada.

Hutton was councillor Harvey Smith's campaign manager in the 1998 Winnipeg municipal election, and supported Glen Murray's successful bid to become mayor. He later broke with Murray, due in part to the mayor's treatment of downtown development issues.

== Activist ==
Hutton opposed the construction of a hockey arena in downtown Winnipeg in the late 1990s and early 2000s, arguing that it would be detrimental to the city. He argued that a multi-sport facility should instead be built east of Main Street. He also opposed the creation of a drug treatment centre in Winnipeg's Central Park area, arguing that it had only recently shed its reputation as a drug- and crime-invested region.

Hutton traveled to the Federal Republic of Yugoslavia in 1996, and appealed for overseas sponsors of Serb children whose lives had been disrupted by the country's wars of secession. He was later a vocal opponent of the 1999 NATO bombing of Yugoslavia, and argued that Kosovo's Serb population was being "ethnically cleansed" by Albanians who wanted to make Kosovo an Albanian province. He noted that NATO bombed several industrial buildings in Kosovo that released dangerous chemicals into the air, and added "[t]here are people that are going to be very cold this winter because we blew up the heating plants in Belgrade".

== Electoral record ==
Municipal

1971 Winnipeg municipal election: Mayor
Candidate	Votes	%
Stephen Juba	139,174	69.68
Jack Willis	49,014	24.54
William Hutton	8,536	4.27
Gordon Anderson	2,765	1.38
Peter Shewchenko	230	0.12
Total valid votes	199,719	100.00

1968 Winnipeg municipal election: Metro Councillor, Ward Nine
Party	Candidate	Votes	%
NDP	William Hutton	5,106	43.78
Greater Winnipeg Election Committee	J. Ross White	4,739	40.63
Independent	William Hawryluk	1,819	15.59
Total valid votes		11,664	

Hawryluk's votes were transferred as follows: Hutton 721, White 681. 417 votes were not transferred.

1968 Winnipeg municipal election: Metro Councillor, Ward Nine
Party	Candidate	Votes	%
NDP	William Hutton	5,827	51.81
Greater Winnipeg Election Committee	J. Ross White	5,420	48.19
Total valid votes		11,247	

Federal

1968 Canadian federal election: Winnipeg South
Party	Candidate	Votes	%	±%
Liberal	James Richardson	23,457	53.11	
Progressive Conservative	Bud Sherman	15,209	34.44	
New Democratic	William Hutton	5,499	12.45	
Total valid votes		44,165	100.00	
Total rejected ballots		228		
Turnout		44,393	82.63	
Electors on the lists		53,726		
