= Souris-Lansdowne =

Provincial electoral district

Souris-Lansdowne was a provincial electoral district in the Canadian province of Manitoba that was represented in the Legislative Assembly of Manitoba from 1958 to 1969.

The district was located in the Westman Region of the province, and contained the rural municipalities of Whitehead, Glenwood, Cornwallis, Oakland, and South Cypress.

== Members of the Legislative Assembly ==
Assembly	Years	Member	Party
Riding recreated from Deloraine-Glenwood, Turtle Mountain, Cypress, Norfolk-Beautiful Plains, and Lansdowne
25th	1958-1959	Earl McKellar	Progressive Conservative
26th	1959-1962	Earl McKellar	Progressive Conservative
27th	1962-1966	Earl McKellar	Progressive Conservative
28th	1966-1969	Earl McKellar	Progressive Conservative
Riding dissolved into Brandon East, Brandon West and Souris-Killarney
