= Richard Seaborn =

Richard Harry Seaborn (born April 25, 1917 in Winnipeg, Manitoba; died March 27, 1991) was a politician in Manitoba, Canada. He was a member of the Legislative Assembly of Manitoba from 1958 to 1966.

The son of Ernest Frederick Seaborn, Seaborn was educated at the University of Alberta and the Juilliard School of Music in New York. He later spent three years in a seminary with the intention of becoming a minister (during his time in the legislature, he was a member of the Salvation Army). He served as music director of CJAY-TV, and was concertmaster and assistant conductor of the Winnipeg Symphony Orchestra from 1942 to 1957. Seaborn also holds a Public Utility Accountancy Certificate.

He was first elected to the Manitoba legislature in the 1958 provincial election, defeating CCF candidate James McIsaac by 147 votes in the north-end Winnipeg riding of Wellington (incumbent Liberal-Progressive Jack St. John finished third). He was re-elected over McIsaac by 228 votes in the 1959 election, and defeated former CCF leader Lloyd Stinson by 220 votes in the 1962 campaign. He lost his seat to Unitarian minister Philip Petursson by 706 votes in the 1966 election. During his time in the legislature, he served as a backbench supporter of Dufferin Roblin's government.

Seaborn also served as a musical director of the Sokol Polish Folk Ensemble.
