= Harry Graham (Manitoba politician) =

Canadian politician

23rd Speaker of the Legislative Assembly of Manitoba
- In office November 24, 1977 – October 13, 1981
- Preceded by: Peter Fox
- Succeeded by: Jim Walding

Member of the Legislative Assembly of Manitoba for Birtle-Russell
- In office February 20, 1969 – March 18, 1986
- Preceded by: Rod Clement
- Succeeded by: None

Personal details
- Born: December 26, 1921 Earl Grey, Saskatchewan
- Died: September 21, 2006 (aged 84) Russell, Manitoba
- Party: Progressive Conservative
- Education: University of Manitoba, University of Arizona, University of Colorado
- Occupation: agrologist

Harry Edward Graham (December 26, 1921 in Foxwarren, Manitoba – September 21, 2006 in Russell, Manitoba) was a politician in Manitoba, Canada. He served as a Progressive Conservative member of the Legislative Assembly of Manitoba from 1969 to 1986.

The son of George Malcolm Graham and Margaret Leckie, he was educated at the University of Manitoba, and worked as a farmer after his graduation. Graham served as Vice-Chairman of the Russell District Hospital, and was also the President of the Progressive Conservative Association in the federal riding of Marquette. In 1951, he married Velma Louise Murdoch.

He first entered politics while helping a friend, Dr. Vern Rosnoski, who was a dentist, run for office. After Rosnoski couldn't find a dentist to take over his practice who could use left-handed tools, Graham ran in his place.

He was first elected to the Manitoba legislature in a by-election on February 20, 1969, defeating Liberal Edward Shust in the riding of Birtle-Russell. The riding had previously been held by the Liberals, and Graham's victory provided an impetus for Progressive Conservative Premier Walter Weir to call a general election later in the year.

The Tories lost government to the New Democratic Party in this election, and Graham nearly lost his own seat to NDP candidate Donald Kostesky. He was re-elected again by a slightly greater margin in the 1973 election, which the NDP also won.

The Progressive Conservatives returned to power in the 1977 election under Sterling Lyon, as Graham again narrowly increased his margin of victory in Birtle-Russell. He was not appointed to cabinet, but rather served as the Speaker of the legislature from November 24, 1977 until 1981.

In 1980, Graham presided over the temporary expulsion from the legislature of Robert Wilson, who had been convicted of a criminal offence. Wilson was permanently expelled in 1981.

Graham won the easiest re-election victory of his career in the election of 1981, running in the redistributed riding of Virden. Ironically, this occurred as the PCs lost government to the NDP. Graham served as an opposition member of the Legislative Assembly for the next five years, and did not seek re-election in 1986.

He died at Russell District Hospital after a lengthy illness.

== Electoral record ==
1969 Manitoba general election: Birtle-Russell
Party	Candidate	Votes	%	±%
Progressive Conservative	Harry Graham	2,374	39.59	
New Democratic	Donald Kostesky	2,263	37.74	
Liberal	John Braendle	1,360	22.68	
Total valid votes		5,997	100.00	
Rejected and discarded votes		12		
Turnout		6,009	72.47	
Electors on the lists		8,292		

Manitoba provincial by-election, February 20, 1969: Birtle-Russell
Party	Candidate	Votes	%	±%	Expenditures
Progressive Conservative	Harry Graham	2,117	46.46		$1,500.98
Liberal	Edward Shust	1,406	30.85	–	$2,476.39
New Democratic	Donald Kostesky	1,034	22.69		$1,248.00
Total valid votes		4,557	100		
Rejected and discarded votes		23			
Turnout		4,580	76.30		
Electors on the lists		6,003			
