= George Hutton =

Canadian politician

George Hutton (February 4, 1922 in Winnipeg, Manitoba – April 18, 1976) was a politician in Manitoba, Canada. He was a Progressive Conservative member of the Legislative Assembly of Manitoba from 1959 to 1966, and was a cabinet minister in the government of Dufferin Roblin.

The son of George Harrison Hutton and Anna Marie Isaacson, Hutton was educated at United College in Winnipeg, receiving a Bachelor of Arts degree. He worked as a farmer before entering politics, and was president of the Manitoba Progressive Conservative Association in 1958. In 1949, he married Elizabeth Sarah Briercliffe.

He ran for the Progressive Conservatives in the constituency of Rockwood—Iberville in the 1958 provincial election, but lost to Liberal-Progressive incumbent Robert Bend by more than 700 votes.

Hutton defeated Bend by 126 votes in the 1959 election, and was appointed to Roblin's cabinet as Minister of Agriculture and Conservation on August 7, 1959. He held his position until his resignation on June 30, 1966. Hutton was responsible for supervising floodway construction around the city of Winnipeg, and for introducing crop insurance to Manitoba. He was re-elected by a significant margin in the 1962 election, but did not run in 1966.

Considered by many as Dufferin Roblin's heir apparent, Hutton left the government for personal reasons and took a United Nations assignment. He worked with the United Nations Food and Agricultural Organization in Turkey and India before moving to Rome, Italy, in 1973. He died there three years later.
