= Barry Strickland =

Canadian politician

Barry Peill Strickland (October 20, 1923 – May 4, 1968) was a politician in Manitoba, Canada. He served as a Progressive Conservative member of the Legislative Assembly of Manitoba from 1958 to 1966.

Strickland was born in Hamiota, Manitoba, the son of Peill Strickland and Myrtle M. Hanna. He was educated in Hamiota schools, and worked as a real estate and insurance agent. Strickland served as a Flying Officer in the Royal Canadian Air Force during World War II, and was the director of the Hamiota Community Development Corporation. In 1947, he married Irene R. Purdy.

Strickland was first elected to the Manitoba legislature in the 1958 provincial election, defeating Liberal-Progressive candidate W.T. Wherrett by 402 votes in the constituency of Hamiota. He was re-elected over LP candidate James Scott in the 1959 election by 241 votes, and by a greater margin over Liberal candidate Frank Taylor in the 1962 election. He served as a backbench supporter of Dufferin Roblin's government during his time in office.

Strickland lost to Liberal Earl Dawson by 151 votes in the 1966 election.

Strickland died in 1968.
