= Rod Clement =

Canadian politician

Rodney Stewart Clement (September 30, 1919 – March 9, 1969) was a politician in Manitoba, Canada. He was a member of the Legislative Assembly of Manitoba from 1949 to 1959 and again from 1966 to 1968. Initially elected as an independent, Clement ended his career as a member of the Manitoba Liberal Party.

== Early life and career ==
Clement was born in Russell, Manitoba, and educated at Binscarth. He served in the Royal Canadian Air Force from 1941 to 1945, saw action in World War II, and was awarded the Distinguished Flying Cross (DFC) award. He later worked as a farmer, rancher, and automobile and implement dealer. He also remained active as a pilot, and operated the first privately owned helicopter in Manitoba. Clement was a member of the United Church of Canada.

== Legislator ==
Clement was first elected to the Manitoba legislature in the 1949 election for the riding of Russell as an independent, supporting the coalition government of Douglas L. Campbell.

He was re-elected in the 1953 election as an Independent Liberal-Progressive. He was endorsed by the official Liberal-Progressive Party during the election, and promised to affiliate with "some political party" at some point in the next legislative session. Clement eventually became a full member of the Liberal-Progressive Party, and was narrowly re-elected under this party's banner in the 1958 election for the new riding of Birtle-Russell.

In the 1959 election, he lost to Progressive Conservative Robert Smellie by 224 votes. He did not contest the 1962 election, but returned to defeat Smellie by 245 votes in the 1966 provincial election. The Progressive Conservatives were returned with a majority government provincially, and Clement served as the critic for agriculture in the official opposition.

Clement resigned his seat on June 5, 1968 to contest the federal riding of Marquette for the Liberal Party of Canada in the 1968 Canadian federal election. He was unsuccessful, losing to Progressive Conservative Craig Stewart by over 3,500 votes.

Clement died in hospital on March 9, 1969. He was 49 years old.

== Electoral record ==
Federal

1968 Canadian federal election: Marquette
Party	Candidate	Votes	%	±%
Progressive Conservative	Craig Stewart	12,706	48.62	
Liberal	Rod Clement	9,183	35.14	
New Democratic	Michael S. Antonation	3,651	13.97	
Independent	Walter Donovan	593	2.27	
Total valid votes		26,133	100.00	
Total rejected ballots		170		
Turnout		26,303	82.52	
Electors on the lists		31,875		
