= Morris McGregor =

Canadian politician

Donald Morris McGregor (April 25, 1923 – July 25, 2003) was a politician in Manitoba, Canada. He was a Progressive Conservative member of the Legislative Assembly of Manitoba from 1962 to 1981.

McGregor was born in Lenore, Manitoba. The son of Donald (Dan) and Mabel McGregor, he was educated in Lenore schools, and served in the Royal Canadian Navy. McGregor later owned a farm in Kenton, Manitoba and became a freemason. He served as a member of the Kenton Chamber of Commerce. In 1954, he married Helen Large of Roblin, Manitoba.

He was first elected to the Manitoba legislature in the provincial election of 1962, defeating his Liberal opponent Malcolm McGregor by a strong majority in the southwestern riding of Virden. He was re-elected with a comfortable majority in the provincial election of 1966, and supported the governments of Dufferin Roblin and Walter Weir as a backbench MLA. In the provincial election of 1969, he defeated incumbent Liberal MLA Earl Dawson by 590 votes after redistribution forced them to compete against one another.

McGregor was re-elected by more comfortable majorities in the elections of 1973 and 1977 Manitoba general election. He did not serve in the cabinet of Sterling Lyon, and retired from the legislature in 1981. He was very proud of his time serving his constituents as his license plate read "IWON5". McGregor was known as an aggressive defender of his constituents' interests throughout his time in office, and was often regarded as a political maverick.

In 1982, he moved to Brandon. McGregor died at Central Park Lodge in Brandon at the age of 80.
