= Robert Smellie (politician) =

Canadian politician

Robert Gordon Smellie (August 23, 1923 – September 29, 2005) was a Canadian politician in Manitoba, Canada. He was a Progressive Conservative member of the Legislative Assembly of Manitoba from 1959 to 1966, and served as a cabinet minister in the government of Dufferin Roblin.

The son of Albert George Smellie and Jessie May Cummings, Smellie was born in Russell, was educated at Brandon College and the Manitoba Law School, and worked as a barrister at law before entering politics. He served in the Canadian Army with the Royal Winnipeg Rifles during World War II and was a member of the Canadian Legion and of the Manitoba Travel and Convention Association. In 1946, Smellie married Lois Evelyn Cochrane. He was originally a supporter of the Liberal-Progressives, but was drafted by Dufferin Roblin to join the Progressive Conservatives in the mid-1950s.

He first ran for the Manitoba legislature in the 1958 provincial election, but lost to Liberal-Progressive incumbent Rodney Clement by 130 votes in the constituency of Birtle-Russell. He ran again in the 1959 election, and defeated Clement by 224 votes as the Progressive Conservatives won their first majority government in forty-five years.

Smellie was re-elected by a greater margin in the 1962 election, and was named Minister of Municipal Affairs on February 27, 1963. He remained in this position until July 22, 1966, when he was demoted to minister without portfolio. He lost to Rod Clement by 145 votes in the 1966 provincial election.

After his defeat, Smellie served chair of the Manitoba Local Boundaries Commission. This group produced a report on Winnipeg's internal boundaries in 1970, but its findings were superseded by the creation of a unicity the following year. After he retired from the practice of law, he served as chairman of the Municipal Board of Manitoba. Smellie died in 2005.
