= Homer Hamilton =

Canadian politician

William Homer Hamilton (February 6, 1913 – September 29, 1997) was a politician in Manitoba, Canada. He was a Progressive Conservative member of the Legislative Assembly of Manitoba from 1959 to 1969.

The son of John Love Hamilton and Sadie Louise Kilpatrick, Hamilton was educated in Sperling and at Dominion Business College. In 1932, he became manager of the Ogilvie Flour Mills elevator in Saltcoats, Saskatchewan, returning to Manitoba in 1936. Hamilton worked as a grain farmer until 1963. He was appointed Drainage Maintenance Superintendent of Dufferin in 1946, and became a trustee on the Sperling Cons. School in 1951. He retained the latter position while serving in the Manitoba legislature. In 1940. Hamilton married Helen June Wickend.

He first ran for the Manitoba legislature in the 1958 provincial election, but lost to Liberal-Progressive incumbent Walter McDonald by 73 votes in the riding of Dufferin. The Progressive Conservatives won a majority government in the 1959 provincial election, and Hamilton defeated McDonald by 154 votes to take the seat on his second try. He was re-elected by greater margins in the elections of 1962 and 1966, and served as a backbench supporter of the governments of Dufferin Roblin and Walter Weir. He did not run for re-election in 1969.

After retiring from politics, he worked as constituency secretary for federal member of parliament Jack Murta.
