= Nelson Shoemaker =

Canadian politician

Nelson M. Shoemaker (February 17, 1911 in Grandview, Manitoba – June 10, 2003) was a politician in Manitoba, Canada. He served as a Liberal member of the Legislative Assembly of Manitoba from 1958 to 1969.

The son of Allan Shoemaker and Alice Louetta Harkness, Shoemaker was educated at a one-room school in Grandview, and became a partner of Shoemaker-McGilvray Agencies in Neepawa, working in the fields of insurance, travel and real estate. He later sold the business, which became known as Gill and Schmall Agencies. In 1933, he married Edith E. Ford. He was director of Associated Hospitals of Manitoba from 1955 to 1960, and an alderman in the town of Neepawa from 1956 to 1959.

He was easily elected to the Manitoba legislature in the 1958 provincial election for the rural riding of Gladstone, ironically as the Liberals were voted out of office at the provincial level. In the 1959 election, he defeated Progressive Conservative challenger Earl Murray by only 149 votes. He was returned by greater margins in the elections of 1962 and 1966, and spent his entire legislative career on the opposition benches.

The Liberal Party lost much of its rural support in the 1969 election, and Shoemaker lost his seat to James Ferguson of the Progressive Conservatives by 417 votes. He did not seek a return to the legislature after this time, and lived in Neepawa until his death.
