= Oscar Bjornson =

Canadian politician

Oscar Ferdinand Bjornson (February 14, 1906 in Glenboro, Manitoba – August 13, 1972) was a politician in Manitoba, Canada. He served as a Progressive Conservative member of the Legislative Assembly of Manitoba from 1959 to 1969.

The son of Magnus Bjornson, Bjornson was educated at the Kelvin Technical High School, and worked as an accountant and service manager. In 1925, he married Idella Moland. He was an officer of Lavoie Motors Ltd. in Lac du Bonnet. Bjornson served for fifteen years with Ford Motor Company of Canada, and Ford Motor Company of India. During World War 2, he served as a technical adviser to the government of India.

He was first elected to the Manitoba legislature in the 1959 provincial election, defeating Liberal-Progressive John Ateah by 85 votes in Lac du Bonnet. He was re-elected over Ateah by a greater margin in the 1962 election, and defeated Liberal James Desilets by 80 votes in the 1966 election. He served as a backbench supporter of Premiers Dufferin Roblin and Walter Weir during his time in office.

Bjornson did not run for re-election in the 1969 election, after redistribution significantly changed the Lac du Bonnet riding.

He died in Calgary, Alberta and was buried in Lac du Bonnet.
