= Douglas Watt (politician) =

Canadian politician

James Douglas Watt (April 26, 1914 in Reston, Manitoba – December 24, 1985) was a politician in Manitoba, Canada. He was a Progressive Conservative member of the Legislative Assembly of Manitoba from 1959 to 1977, and served as a cabinet minister in the government of Walter Weir.

The son of William Watt and Annabelle Milliken, Watt was educated at Hillview schools, and worked as a farmer. In 1936, he married Rossie Grace Smeltz. He was an active freemason, and became deputy reeve of Pipestone municipality in 1958.

He was first elected to the Manitoba legislature in a by-election on November 26, 1959, defeated Liberal-Progressive candidate Harry Patmore by 77 votes in the rural riding of Arthur, in the province's southwestern corner. He was re-elected over Patmore by a greater margin in the 1962 general election, and served as a backbench supporter of Dufferin Roblin's government.

In the 1966 election, Watt defeated Patmore for a third time by 95 votes. Weir replaced Roblin as Premier in 1967, and Watt entered cabinet as Minister of Agriculture on September 24, 1968. His tenure in office was short-lived, as the Progressive Conservatives lost power to the New Democratic Party following the 1969 election.

Watt increased his own majority in the 1969 election, as Liberal support declined throughout the province (the NDP did not have a strong support base in Arthur). He was re-elected again by a significant margin in the 1973 election, and retired in 1977.

He died in Reston at the age of 71.
