= Lemuel Harris =

Canadian politician

Lemuel (Lem) Harris (December 15, 1907 in Wales – July 24, 1996) was a politician in Manitoba, Canada. He was a member of the Manitoba legislature from 1959 to 1969, representing the social democratic CCF and its successor, the NDP.

Harris moved with his family to Canada at a young age. He worked for the Burns meat packing plant in Winnipeg. He was from a trade-union background and represented a strongly working-class constituency during his time in office.

He was elected for the riding of Logan in the election of 1959, defeating Progressive Conservative A.E. Bennett by 177 votes. He was re-elected by greater margins in the election of 1962 and the election of 1966, and supported Edward Schreyer's bid to become leader of the NDP in 1968–69. He retired from politics in 1969, just prior to the NDP's rise to government within the province.

Harris died in Winnipeg at the age of 88.
