= Leonard Claydon =

Canadian politician (1915-1971)

Leonard Harold Claydon (December 31, 1915 in Winnipeg, Manitoba – December 8, 1971) was a politician in Manitoba, Canada. He served in the Manitoba legislature as a Progressive Conservative from 1969 until his death. Prime minister John Diefenbaker was friend and wrote the eulogy at his funeral.

Claydon was educated at Winnipeg public schools and St. John's College, Manitoba. He worked as a merchant and technician, and was in the Royal Canadian Air Force from 1940 to 1946, spending three and a half years overseas and reaching the rank of Flight Lieutenant. In the 1960s he owned and operated a hardware store on Sherbrook Street in Winnipeg with his wife Sarah (Sadie). The Claydon Hardware Store sold the first black and white televisions to Winnipeggers and stocked an assortment of appliances, toolkits of hammers, nails and radios. He was a Scottish Rite freemason and a member of the United Church of Canada. Claydon also worked for the Canadian Pacific Railway and Trans-Canada Airlines.

He was elected to the Winnipeg City Council in the 1960 municipal election, was re-elected four times. He chaired the city's Public Works Committee from 1961 to 1969, and served as acting deputy mayor in 1968.

Claydon won a by-election for the Manitoba legislature in the riding of Wolseley in February 1969, following the resignation of former Premier Dufferin Roblin. He remained a member of the Winnipeg City Council after his provincial election.

Claydon was re-elected in the 1969 provincial election, but died two years later in Winnipeg after a lengthy illness.

He played an important role in returning a steam train now known as the Prairie Dog Central into service in the Winnipeg area. Claydon acquired the salvaged steam engine to a new name, The Claydon Cannonball prior to being called the Prairie Dog Central.

== Electoral record ==
Manitoba provincial by-election, February 20, 1969: Wolseley Resignation of Duff Roblin
Party	Candidate	Votes	%	±%	Expenditures
Progressive Conservative	Leonard Claydon	2,161	46.62		$2,640.69
Liberal	Julius Koteles	1,528	33.01	–	$10,753.19
New Democratic	Archie Stone	944	20.37		$1,423.50
Total valid votes		4,633	98.38		
Rejected and discarded votes		75	1.62		
Turnout		4,708	41.97		
Electors on the lists		11,217			
