= Earl McKellar =

Canadian politician

Malcolm Earl McKellar (20 April 1918 – 18 April 1976) was a politician in Manitoba, Canada. He was a member of the Legislative Assembly of Manitoba from 1958 to 1976, representing the Progressive Conservative Party.

== Biography ==
McKellar was educated in Manitoba's public school system, at Nesbitt School District #724, and worked as a farmer and insurance agent. He was a member of the Lions Club and the Masonic Order.

He was first elected to the Manitoba legislature in the 1958 election, winning a relatively easy victory in the southwestern rural riding of Souris-Lansdowne. He was re-elected in the elections of 1959, 1962, 1966, 1969 and 1973, on the last two occasions for the redistributed riding of Souris-Killarney. The only time when his election was in doubt was 1966, when the Liberals ran a strong challenger. He was not appointed to cabinet by either Dufferin Roblin or Walter Weir.

McKellar was elected as a director of Portage Mutual Insurance in 1973. He died in office in 1976.
