= Birtle-Russell =

Defunct provincial electoral district in Manitoba, Canada

Birtle-Russell is a former provincial electoral district in Manitoba, Canada.

Birtle-Russell was established in 1957, created by the first Independent Boundaries Commission in Manitoba. It was located in the western part of the province, on the border with Saskatchewan. It included the area around the towns of Birtle and Russell. Political power in the area shifted between the Progressive Conservatives and the Liberal-Progressives and Liberals until 1969. When the New Democratic Party first came to office the area became a Progressive Conservative stronghold.

== Members of the Legislative Assembly ==
Name	Party	Took office	Left office
Rod Clement	Liberal-Progressive	1949 (In the riding of Russell)	1959
Robert Smellie	Progressive Conservative	1959	1966
Rod Clement	Liberal	1966	1968
Harry Graham	Progressive Conservative	1969	1986 (From 1981-1986 representing Virden)

== Election results ==
1969 Manitoba general election
Party	Candidate	Votes	%	±%
Progressive Conservative	Harry Graham	2,374	39.59	
New Democratic	Donald Kostesky	2,263	37.74	
Liberal	John Braendle	1,360	22.68	
Total valid votes		5,997	100.00	
Rejected and discarded votes		12		
Turnout		6,009	72.47	
Electors on the lists		8,292		

== See also ==
- List of Manitoba provincial electoral districts
- Canadian provincial electoral districts
