= Carolyne Morrison =

Canadian politician

Member of the Legislative Assembly of Manitoba for Pembina
- In office December 9, 1960 – June 25, 1969
- Preceded by: Maurice Ridley
- Succeeded by: George Henderson

Personal details
- Born: February 18, 1905 Ridgeville, Manitoba, Canada
- Died: August 24, 1997 (aged 92) Manitou, Manitoba, Canada
- Party: Progressive Conservative Party of Manitoba
- Occupation: teacher

Carolyne Alexandra Morrison (February 18, 1905 – August 24, 1997) was a politician in Manitoba, Canada. She was a Progressive Conservative member of the Legislative Assembly of Manitoba from 1960 to 1969.

Born Carolyne McBean in Ridgeville, Manitoba in 1905, to William McBean and Nellie Marshall, Morrison was educated at Emerson, Manitoba, and fulfilled teacher training in Brandon. She was a teacher and homemaker prior to her entry into politics. In 1938, she married Hugh Morrison, who was serving his first term as the MLA for the constituency of Manitou, having been elected in 1936; they had no children. Hugh continued to serve as an MLA until his death in 1957, by which time his constituency had become Manitou–Morden. Carolyne ran for election to the same body following the death of Maurice Ridley.

She was first elected to the legislature in a by-election on December 9, 1960, winning easy election in the rural, southern riding of Pembina, a successor constituency to her husband's former constituency of Manitou–Morden. In the 1962 election, she defeated Liberal Charles Cousins by 211 votes. She increased her margin of victory in the 1966 election, and did not run in 1969. Morrison spent her legislative career as a PC backbencher; premiers Dufferin Roblin and Walter Weir never appointed her to cabinet.

She was one of only two women in the Manitoba legislature during the 1960s (the other being her Progressive Conservative colleague Thelma Forbes, who served as a cabinet minister and Speaker of the Legislative Assembly of Manitoba), and only the fifth woman ever elected to the legislature.

Morrison also served in the local Red Cross and on the Manitou Hospital Board; she was a news correspondent for the local district for the Western Canadian newspaper.

She died in Manitou at age 92, after suffering from Alzheimer's disease in her old age.
