= Donald Orchard =

Canadian politician

Member of the Legislative Assembly of Manitoba for Pembina
- In office October 11, 1977 – April 25, 1995
- Preceded by: George Henderson
- Succeeded by: Peter George Dyck

Personal details
- Born: April 11, 1946 (age 80) Miami, Manitoba, Canada
- Party: Progressive Conservative Party of Manitoba
- Occupation: Farmer

Donald Warder Orchard (born April 11, 1946) is a politician in Manitoba, Canada. He was a member of the Legislative Assembly of Manitoba from 1977 to 1995, and was a cabinet minister in the Progressive Conservative governments of Sterling Lyon and Gary Filmon.

The son of Warder Franklin John Orchard and Muriel Bernice King, he was born in Miami, Manitoba, and was educated at the University of Manitoba. He worked as a farmer after graduation, becoming active in the Miami Agricultural Society and the local Masonic organization. In 1969, he married Edna Jane Simpson.

He was first elected to the Manitoba legislature in the provincial election of 1977, in the safe Conservative seat of Pembina. He was re-elected in this riding in the elections of 1981, 1986, 1988 and 1990, each time by a comfortable margin.

The Progressive Conservatives won the 1977 election under Sterling Lyon, and Orchard was appointed Minister of Highways and Transport on November 15, 1979. He was also appointed Chairman of the Provisional Land Use Committee on January 1, 1980, and was given ministerial responsibility for Manitoba Data Services on January 16, 1981. The social-democratic New Democratic Party won the 1981 election, and Orchard resigned from cabinet on November 30, 1981.

The Progressive Conservatives won a minority government in 1988 under Gary Filmon, and Orchard was appointed Minister of Health on May 9 of that year (despite the fact that he attempted to remove Filmon as party leader in 1986). He held this portfolio until September 10, 1993, when he was appointed Minister of Energy and Mines with responsibility for the Manitoba Hydro Act. He did not seek re-election in 1995, and resigned from cabinet on March 20 of that year.

As Health Minister, Orchard banned Medicare coverage from Henry Morgentaler's private abortion clinic. This decision provoked criticism from both sides of the abortion debate; some wanted the clinic closed entirely, while others wanted full funding.

Orchard was a rural populist, on the right wing of the Progressive Conservative Party. In 2003, he supported cooperation between the Canadian Alliance with the Progressive Conservative Party of Canada in the Portage—Lisgar riding, before the two parties were formally merged.
