= David Howard Harrison =

Canadian politician

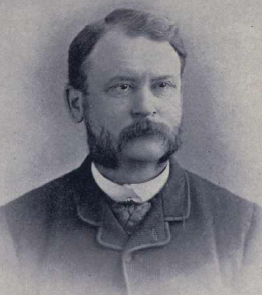

6th Premier of Manitoba
- In office December 26, 1887 – January 19, 1888
- Monarch: Victoria
- Lieutenant Governor: James Cox Aikins
- Preceded by: John Norquay
- Succeeded by: Thomas Greenway

Member of the Legislative Assembly of Manitoba for Minnedosa
- In office January 23, 1883 – December 9, 1886
- Preceded by: John Crerar
- Succeeded by: District divided

Member of the Legislative Assembly of Manitoba for Minnedosa West
- In office December 9, 1886 – July 11, 1888
- Preceded by: District divided
- Succeeded by: James Gillies

Personal details
- Born: June 1, 1843 London Township, Upper Canada
- Died: September 8, 1905 (aged 62) Vancouver, British Columbia
- Party: Liberal-Conservative
- Spouses: Margaret Notman (m. 1866) Katherine Stevenson (m. 1874)
- Children: 5 (2 sons and 3 daughters)
- Education: University of Toronto; McGill University
- Occupation: physician, businessman, rancher
- Profession: politician
- Cabinet: Minister of Agriculture (1886–1887); Provincial Treasurer (1887–1888); President of the Council (1887–1888); Provincial Lands Commissioner (1887–1888)

David Howard Harrison (June 1, 1843 – September 8, 1905) was a politician, farmer and physician. He was born in the township of London, Canada West, and moved to Manitoba in 1882. He and his family soon established themselves as substantial landowners.

Harrison's political fortunes went through a remarkable rise and fall between 1882 and 1888. He forged an alliance with Premier John Norquay soon after moving to Manitoba, and in the election of 1883 was elected for the riding of Minnedosa as a Liberal-Conservative, easily defeating his Liberal opponent David Glass. On August 27, 1886, Harrison was appointed Minister of Agriculture, Statistics and Health, and was touted as a possible successor to Norquay. He was re-elected for the new riding of Minnedosa West later in the year, this time defeating Liberal J.W. Shanks.

Norquay was forced to resign in early December 1887, after a financial crisis involving railway transfers cost him the support of his ministers. Harrison became Premier on December 26, 1887, and attempted to form an administration from the remnants of Norquay's alliance.

Harrison's ministry never got off the ground. He was unable to win the support of a clear majority of MLAs, and lost a vital by-election on January 12, 1888. He resigned one week later, at which time the Lt. Governor called on Liberal Thomas Greenway to form a new administration.

Harrison was technically a "non-partisan" Premier, but his ministry was closely aligned with the national Conservative Party of John A. Macdonald and was dominated by local Conservatives. An official Conservative Party was formed in the province soon after his resignation.

After resigning as Premier, Harrison seems to have abandoned active political life. He allowed Norquay to retake the leadership of the "Conservative Party", and did not seek re-election in 1888. Achieving success in Neepawa as a banker, he moved to British Columbia in 1900. He died of a lingering illness five years later.
