= Gilbert Hutton =

Canadian politician (1908-1995)

Member of the Legislative Assembly of Manitoba for Minnedosa
- In office 1953–1958
- Preceded by: Henry Rungay
- Succeeded by: Charles Shuttleworth

Personal details
- Born: April 24, 1908 Bethany, Manitoba
- Died: January 20, 1995 (aged 86) Minnedosa, Manitoba
- Party: Manitoba Social Credit Party

Gilbert "Bunty" Hutton (April 24, 1908 in Bethany, Manitoba – January 20, 1995) was a politician in Manitoba, Canada. He served in the Legislative Assembly of Manitoba from 1953 to 1958 as a representative of the Social Credit League. His middle name is alternately listed as "Alexander" and "Eugene".

Hutton was educated in local schools, and received a journeyman's electrician certificate in 1936. He owned an Electric & Appliance business in Minnedosa from 1952 until the 1970s. He was a fan of music, and often played the violin at local dances. He also served on the Minnedosa town council.

Hutton was elected to the assembly in the 1953 provincial election, defeating incumbent Liberal-Progressive Henry S. Rungay by thirty-two votes in the constituency of Minnedosa. He was one of only two Social Credit MLAs to serve in the legislature in this period, and the only one who remained with the party through to the 1958 election. According to reports from the Winnipeg Free Press, the Social Credit MLAs focused on the need for monetary reform in their first speeches to the legislature.

The Social Credit League was eliminated from the legislature in the 1958 election, and Hutton was resoundingly defeated in Minnedosa by Liberal-Progressive MLA Charles Shuttleworth, whose previous constituency had been eliminated by redistribution.

Hutton moved to Estevan, Saskatchewan in the 1970s, and worked for a co-operative.

He returned to Minnedosa in 1973. Hutton later died there at the age of 86.
