= Minnedosa (electoral district) =

Defunct provincial electoral district in Manitoba, Canada

Coordinates: 49.844°N 100.280°W

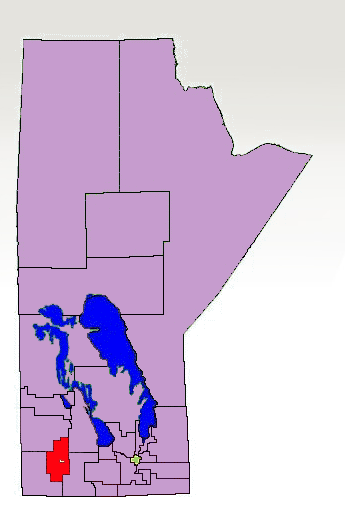
The 1998–2011 boundaries for Minnedosa highlighted in red.

Minnedosa was a provincial electoral district of Manitoba, Canada, from 1881 to 2011. It was created in 1881 with the expansion of the province's western boundary. From 1886 to 1888, it was divided into two ridings, Minnedosa East and Minnedosa West.

Minnedosa was located in the southwestern region of Manitoba. It was bordered by Russell to the north, Ste. Rose to the east, Turtle Mountain to the east and south, and Arthur-Virden to the south and west. The constituency also surrounded the city of Brandon, which is divided into the ridings of Brandon East and Brandon West.

Minnedosa itself was the largest community in the constituency. Other communities in riding the included Souris, Rivers, Rapid City, Shilo, Basswood, Wawanesa, and Erickson.

Minnedosa's population in 1996 was 18,694. In 1999, the average family income was $46,627, and the unemployment rate was 3.50%. Agriculture accounted for 22% of the riding's industry, followed by government services at 12% and health and social services at 12%. Six per cent of the population was of German background, and 15% were over 65 years of age.

Minnedosa was held by the Progressive Conservative Party for several decades, but the New Democratic Party made efforts to win the seat in the riding's last years. In the provincial election of 2003, the Conservative Party retained the seat by only 12 votes, but in the 2007 Election the Progressive Conservative incumbent Leanne Rowat won with 52.83% and the NDP candidate won 38.53% of the vote.

As a result of the 2008 Electoral Redistibution, for the 2011 Election, the constituency was dissolved. Most of the riding, including the city of Minnedosa, became part of the new riding of Riding Mountain. Smaller portions were transferred to the new ridings of Spruce Woods, Arthur-Virden, Brandon East, and Brandon West.

== Members of the Legislative Assembly ==
=== Minnedosa (original constituency) ===
Name	Party	Took office	Left office
John Crerar	Lib	1881	1883
David H. Harrison	Lib-Cons	1883	1886

=== Minnedosa East ===
Name	Party	Took office	Left office
James Gillies	Cons	1886	1888

=== Minnedosa West ===
Name	Party	Took office	Left office
David H. Harrison	Lib-Cons	1886	1888

=== Minnedosa (re-established) ===
Name	Party	Took office	Left office
James Gillies	Lib-Cons	1888	1892
Robert Myers	Lib	1892	1903
William B. Waddell	Cons	1903	1910
John Thompson	Lib	1910	1914
George Grierson	Lib	1914	1922
Neil Cameron	Prog	1922	1927
Earl Rutledge	Cons	1927	1948
Henry Rungay	Lib-Prog	1948	1953
Gilbert Hutton	Social Credit	1953	1958
Charles Shuttleworth	Lib-Prog	1958	1959
Walter Weir	PC	1959	1971
Dave Blake	PC	1971	1988
Harold Gilleshammer	PC	1988	2003
Leanne Rowat	PC	2003	2011

== Election results ==
=== 1881 by-election ===
Manitoba provincial by-election, October 26, 1881
Party	Candidate	Votes	%
Unknown	John Crerar	407	51.26
Unknown	S. A. Cornell	387	48.74
Total valid votes		794	–
Rejected		N/A	–
Eligible voters / Turnout		N/A	–
Source(s) Source: Manitoba. Chief Electoral Officer (1999). Statement of Votes for the 37th Provincial General Election, September 21, 1999 (PDF) (Report). Winnipeg: Elections Manitoba.

=== 1883 ===
1883 Manitoba general election
Party	Candidate	Votes	%	±%
Conservative	David Howard Harrison	495	53.63	–
Liberal	David Glass	428	46.37	–
Total valid votes		923	–	–
Rejected		N/A	–	
Eligible voters / Turnout		N/A	–	–
Source(s) Source: Manitoba. Chief Electoral Officer (1999). Statement of Votes for the 37th Provincial General Election, September 21, 1999 (PDF) (Report). Winnipeg: Elections Manitoba.

=== 1888 ===
1888 Manitoba general election
Party	Candidate	Votes	%	±%
Conservative	James Gillies	248	35.73	-17.89
Liberal	Robert Hill Myers	227	32.71	-13.66
Independent	S. L. Hend	219	31.56	–
Total valid votes		694	–	–
Rejected		N/A	–	
Eligible voters / Turnout		N/A	–	–
Source(s) Source: Manitoba. Chief Electoral Officer (1999). Statement of Votes for the 37th Provincial General Election, September 21, 1999 (PDF) (Report). Winnipeg: Elections Manitoba.

=== 1892 ===
1892 Manitoba general election
Party	Candidate	Votes	%	±%
Liberal	Robert Hill Myers	469	53.60	20.89
Conservative	William James Roche	406	46.40	10.67
Total valid votes		875	–	–
Rejected		N/A	–	
Eligible voters / Turnout		1,000	87.50	–
Source(s) Source: Manitoba. Chief Electoral Officer (1999). Statement of Votes for the 37th Provincial General Election, September 21, 1999 (PDF) (Report). Winnipeg: Elections Manitoba.

=== 1896 ===
1896 Manitoba general election
Party	Candidate	Votes	%	±%
Liberal	Robert Hill Myers	Acclaimed	–	–
Total valid votes		–	–	–
Rejected		N/A	–	
Eligible voters / Turnout		1,207	–	–
Source(s) Source: Manitoba. Chief Electoral Officer (1999). Statement of Votes for the 37th Provincial General Election, September 21, 1999 (PDF) (Report). Winnipeg: Elections Manitoba.

=== 1899 ===
1899 Manitoba general election
Party	Candidate	Votes	%	±%
Liberal	Robert Hill Myers	694	58.61	–
Conservative	Thomas Henry Jackson	490	41.39	–
Total valid votes		1,184	–	–
Rejected		N/A	–	
Eligible voters / Turnout		1,468	80.65	–
Source(s) Source: Manitoba. Chief Electoral Officer (1999). Statement of Votes for the 37th Provincial General Election, September 21, 1999 (PDF) (Report). Winnipeg: Elections Manitoba.

=== 1903 ===
1903 Manitoba general election
Party	Candidate	Votes	%	±%
Conservative	William B. Waddell	751	52.85	11.46
Liberal	Neil Cameron	670	47.15	-11.46
Total valid votes		1,421	–	–
Rejected		N/A	–	
Eligible voters / Turnout		1,565	90.80	10.14
Source(s) Source: Manitoba. Chief Electoral Officer (1999). Statement of Votes for the 37th Provincial General Election, September 21, 1999 (PDF) (Report). Winnipeg: Elections Manitoba.

=== 1907 ===
1907 Manitoba general election
Party	Candidate	Votes	%	±%
Conservative	William B. Waddell	792	55.85	3.00
Liberal	Ernest William Pearson	626	44.15	-3.00
Total valid votes		1,418	–	–
Rejected		N/A	–	
Eligible voters / Turnout		1,884	75.27	-15.53
Source(s) Source: Manitoba. Chief Electoral Officer (1999). Statement of Votes for the 37th Provincial General Election, September 21, 1999 (PDF) (Report). Winnipeg: Elections Manitoba.

=== 1910 ===
1910 Manitoba general election
Party	Candidate	Votes	%	±%
Liberal	John W. Thompson	971	50.89	6.74
Conservative	William B. Waddell	937	49.11	-6.74
Total valid votes		1,908	–	–
Rejected		N/A	–	
Eligible voters / Turnout		2,279	83.72	8.46
Source(s) Source: Manitoba. Chief Electoral Officer (1999). Statement of Votes for the 37th Provincial General Election, September 21, 1999 (PDF) (Report). Winnipeg: Elections Manitoba.

=== 1914 ===
1914 Manitoba general election
Party	Candidate	Votes	%	±%
Liberal	George Grierson	1,174	54.89	3.99
Conservative	William B. Waddell	965	45.11	-3.99
Total valid votes		2,139	–	–
Rejected		N/A	–	
Eligible voters / Turnout		2,457	87.06	3.34
Source(s) Source: Manitoba. Chief Electoral Officer (1999). Statement of Votes for the 37th Provincial General Election, September 21, 1999 (PDF) (Report). Winnipeg: Elections Manitoba.

=== 1915 ===
1915 Manitoba general election
Party	Candidate	Votes	%	±%
Liberal	George Grierson	1,173	64.20	9.32
Conservative	James R. Muir	654	35.80	-9.32
Total valid votes		1,827	–	–
Rejected		N/A	–	
Eligible voters / Turnout		2,540	71.93	-15.13
Source(s) Source: Manitoba. Chief Electoral Officer (1999). Statement of Votes for the 37th Provincial General Election, September 21, 1999 (PDF) (Report). Winnipeg: Elections Manitoba.

=== 1917 by-election ===
Manitoba provincial by-election, November 30, 1917
Party	Candidate	Votes	%	±%
Liberal	George Grierson	Acclaimed	–	–
Total valid votes		–	–	–
Rejected		–	–	
Eligible voters / Turnout		–	–	–
Source(s) Source: Manitoba. Chief Electoral Officer (1999). Statement of Votes for the 37th Provincial General Election, September 21, 1999 (PDF) (Report). Winnipeg: Elections Manitoba.

=== 1920 ===
1920 Manitoba general election
Party	Candidate	Votes	%	±%
Liberal	George Grierson	1,236	56.49	–
Farmer	W. T. Bielby	952	43.51	–
Total valid votes		2,188	–	–
Rejected		N/A	–	
Eligible voters / Turnout		3,962	55.22	–
Source(s) Source: Manitoba. Chief Electoral Officer (1999). Statement of Votes for the 37th Provincial General Election, September 21, 1999 (PDF) (Report). Winnipeg: Elections Manitoba.

=== 1922 ===
1922 Manitoba general election
Party	Candidate	Votes	%	±%
United Farmers	Neil Cameron	1,966	62.89	–
Liberal	Arthur Wellesley Shaw	1,160	37.11	-19.38
Total valid votes		3,126	–	–
Rejected		N/A	–	
Eligible voters / Turnout		4,687	66.70	11.47
Source(s) Source: Manitoba. Chief Electoral Officer (1999). Statement of Votes for the 37th Provincial General Election, September 21, 1999 (PDF) (Report). Winnipeg: Elections Manitoba.

=== 1927 ===
1927 Manitoba general election
Party	Candidate	Votes	%	±%
Conservative	Earl Rutledge	1,595	42.56	–
Progressive	Norman P. Shuttleworth	1,581	42.18	–
Liberal	Walter Richardson	572	15.26	-21.85
Total valid votes		3,748	–	–
Rejected		N/A	–	
Eligible voters / Turnout		4,759	78.76	12.06
Source(s) Source: Manitoba. Chief Electoral Officer (1999). Statement of Votes for the 37th Provincial General Election, September 21, 1999 (PDF) (Report). Winnipeg: Elections Manitoba.

=== 1932 ===
1932 Manitoba general election
Party	Candidate	Votes	%	±%
Conservative	Earl Rutledge	2,432	46.72	4.16
Liberal–Progressive	Neil Cameron	2,378	45.68	–
Independent	Cecil Lorne St. John	396	7.61	–
Total valid votes		5,206	–	–
Rejected		N/A	–	
Eligible voters / Turnout		6,194	84.05	5.29
Source(s) Source: Manitoba. Chief Electoral Officer (1999). Statement of Votes for the 37th Provincial General Election, September 21, 1999 (PDF) (Report). Winnipeg: Elections Manitoba.

=== 1936 ===
1936 Manitoba general election
Party	Candidate	Votes	%	±%
Conservative	Earl Rutledge	2,734	45.97	-0.75
Liberal–Progressive	Henry Rungay	2,461	41.38	-4.30
Independent Labour	H. J. Martin	753	12.66	–
Total valid votes		5,948	–	–
Rejected		193	–	
Eligible voters / Turnout		7,090	86.61	2.57
Source(s) Source: Manitoba. Chief Electoral Officer (1999). Statement of Votes for the 37th Provincial General Election, September 21, 1999 (PDF) (Report). Winnipeg: Elections Manitoba.

=== 1941 ===
1941 Manitoba general election
Party	Candidate	Votes	%	±%
Conservative	Earl Rutledge	2,963	60.77	14.80
Liberal–Progressive	Henry Rungay	1,913	39.23	-2.14
Total valid votes		4,876	–	–
Rejected		92	–	
Eligible voters / Turnout		6,908	71.92	-14.70
Source(s) Source: Manitoba. Chief Electoral Officer (1999). Statement of Votes for the 37th Provincial General Election, September 21, 1999 (PDF) (Report). Winnipeg: Elections Manitoba.

=== 1945 ===
1945 Manitoba general election
Party	Candidate	Votes	%	±%
Progressive Conservative	Earl Rutledge	2,639	64.86	–
Co-operative Commonwealth	Ralph Gordon Firth	1,430	35.14	–
Total valid votes		4,069	–	–
Rejected		43	–	
Eligible voters / Turnout		6,673	61.62	-10.30
Source(s) Source: Manitoba. Chief Electoral Officer (1999). Statement of Votes for the 37th Provincial General Election, September 21, 1999 (PDF) (Report). Winnipeg: Elections Manitoba.

=== 1948 by-election ===
Manitoba provincial by-election, November 2, 1948 Resignation of Earl Rutledge
Party	Candidate	Votes	%	±%
Liberal–Progressive	Henry Rungay	3,470	71.81	–
Co-operative Commonwealth	Ralph Gordon Frith	1,362	28.19	-6.96
Total valid votes		4,832	–	–
Rejected		N/A	–	
Eligible voters / Turnout		N/A	–	–
Source(s) Source: Manitoba. Chief Electoral Officer (1999). Statement of Votes for the 37th Provincial General Election, September 21, 1999 (PDF) (Report). Winnipeg: Elections Manitoba.

=== 1949 ===
1949 Manitoba general election
Party	Candidate	Votes	%	±%
Liberal–Progressive	Henry Rungay	Acclaimed	–	–
Total valid votes		–	–	–
Rejected		N/A	–	
Eligible voters / Turnout		5,221	–	–
Source(s) Source: Manitoba. Chief Electoral Officer (1999). Statement of Votes for the 37th Provincial General Election, September 21, 1999 (PDF) (Report). Winnipeg: Elections Manitoba.

=== 1953 ===
1953 Manitoba general election
Party	Candidate	Votes	%	±%
Social Credit	Gilbert Hutton	1,688	39.19	–
Liberal–Progressive	Henry Rungay	1,572	36.50	–
Progressive Conservative	John Anthony Burgess	1,047	24.31	–
Total valid votes		4,307	–	–
Rejected		71	–	
Eligible voters / Turnout		5,102	85.81	–
Source(s) Source: Manitoba. Chief Electoral Officer (1999). Statement of Votes for the 37th Provincial General Election, September 21, 1999 (PDF) (Report). Winnipeg: Elections Manitoba.

=== 1958 ===
1958 Manitoba general election
Party	Candidate	Votes	%	±%
Liberal–Progressive	Charles Shuttleworth	2,117	40.89	4.39
Progressive Conservative	Sidney Paler	1,983	38.30	13.99
Social Credit	Gilbert Hutton	634	12.25	-26.95
Co-operative Commonwealth	William A. Yuel	443	8.56	–
Total valid votes		5,177	–	–
Rejected		25	–	
Eligible voters / Turnout		7,037	73.92	-11.89
Source(s) Source: Manitoba. Chief Electoral Officer (1999). Statement of Votes for the 37th Provincial General Election, September 21, 1999 (PDF) (Report). Winnipeg: Elections Manitoba.

=== 1959 ===
1959 Manitoba general election
Party	Candidate	Votes	%	±%
Progressive Conservative	Walter Weir	2,386	43.34	5.04
Liberal–Progressive	Charles Shuttleworth	2,029	36.86	-4.04
Co-operative Commonwealth	J. M. Lee	1,090	19.80	11.24
Total valid votes		5,505	–	–
Rejected		21	–	
Eligible voters / Turnout		7,029	78.62	4.69
Source(s) Source: Manitoba. Chief Electoral Officer (1999). Statement of Votes for the 37th Provincial General Election, September 21, 1999 (PDF) (Report). Winnipeg: Elections Manitoba.

=== 1962 ===
1962 Manitoba general election
Party	Candidate	Votes	%	±%
Progressive Conservative	Walter Weir	2,828	53.44	10.10
Liberal	Frank Anderson	1,536	29.02	–
New Democratic	John M. Lee	472	8.92	–
Social Credit	Charles V. Hutton	456	8.62	–
Total valid votes		5,292	–	–
Rejected		11	–	
Eligible voters / Turnout		6,814	77.83	-0.79
Source(s) Source: Manitoba. Chief Electoral Officer (1999). Statement of Votes for the 37th Provincial General Election, September 21, 1999 (PDF) (Report). Winnipeg: Elections Manitoba.

=== 1966 ===
1966 Manitoba general election
Party	Candidate	Votes	%	±%
Progressive Conservative	Walter Weir	2,136	41.29	-12.15
Liberal	Don McNabb	1,615	31.22	2.19
Social Credit	C. V. Hutton	774	14.96	6.35
New Democratic	John Lee	648	12.53	3.61
Total valid votes		5,173	–	–
Rejected		27	–	
Eligible voters / Turnout		6,598	78.81	0.99
Source(s) Source: Manitoba. Chief Electoral Officer (1999). Statement of Votes for the 37th Provincial General Election, September 21, 1999 (PDF) (Report). Winnipeg: Elections Manitoba.

=== 1969 ===
1969 Manitoba general election
Party	Candidate	Votes	%	±%
Progressive Conservative	Walter Weir	3,525	56.26	14.96
New Democratic	Emile Roy Shellborn	1,713	27.34	14.81
Liberal	Donald Argyle McNabb	1,028	16.41	-14.81
Total valid votes		6,266	–	–
Rejected		17	–	
Eligible voters / Turnout		8,285	75.84	-2.98
Source(s) Source: Manitoba. Chief Electoral Officer (1999). Statement of Votes for the 37th Provincial General Election, September 21, 1999 (PDF) (Report). Winnipeg: Elections Manitoba.

=== 1971 by-election ===
Manitoba provincial by-election, November 16, 1971 Resignation of Walter Weir
Party	Candidate	Votes	%	±%
Progressive Conservative	Dave Blake	3,532	50.39	-5.86
New Democratic	Emil Shellborn	2,348	33.50	6.16
Liberal	Hugh Milton Stephenson	1,129	16.11	-0.30
Total valid votes		7,009	–	–
Rejected		N/A	–	
Eligible voters / Turnout		N/A	–	–
Source(s) Source: Manitoba. Chief Electoral Officer (1999). Statement of Votes for the 37th Provincial General Election, September 21, 1999 (PDF) (Report). Winnipeg: Elections Manitoba.

=== 1973 ===
1973 Manitoba general election
Party	Candidate	Votes	%	±%
Progressive Conservative	Dave Blake	3,777	52.28	1.89
New Democratic	Lawrence Bell	2,708	37.49	3.99
Liberal	Ed Turner	739	10.23	-5.88
Total valid votes		7,224	–	–
Rejected		24	–	
Eligible voters / Turnout		8,729	83.03	–
Source(s) Source: Manitoba. Chief Electoral Officer (1999). Statement of Votes for the 37th Provincial General Election, September 21, 1999 (PDF) (Report). Winnipeg: Elections Manitoba.

=== 1977 ===
1977 Manitoba general election
Party	Candidate	Votes	%	±%
Progressive Conservative	Dave Blake	3,912	56.13	3.85
New Democratic	John Martens	2,311	33.16	-4.33
Liberal	Albert Moad	474	6.80	-3.43
Social Credit	C. V. Hutton	272	3.90	–
Total valid votes		6,969	–	–
Rejected		10	–	
Eligible voters / Turnout		9,003	77.52	-5.51
Source(s) Source: Manitoba. Chief Electoral Officer (1999). Statement of Votes for the 37th Provincial General Election, September 21, 1999 (PDF) (Report). Winnipeg: Elections Manitoba.

=== 1981 ===
1981 Manitoba general election
Party	Candidate	Votes	%	±%
Progressive Conservative	Dave Blake	4,160	55.05	-1.09
New Democratic	Gary Grant	3,397	44.95	11.79
Total valid votes		7,557	99.68	–
Rejected		24	0.32	
Turnout		7,581	67.33	-10.19
Eligible voters		11,260		
Source(s) Source: Manitoba. Chief Electoral Officer (1999). Statement of Votes for the 37th Provincial General Election, September 21, 1999 (PDF) (Report). Winnipeg: Elections Manitoba.

=== 1986 ===
1986 Manitoba general election
Party	Candidate	Votes	%	±%
Progressive Conservative	Dave Blake	3,316	41.77	-13.27
New Democratic	Gary Grant	2,369	29.84	-15.11
Confederation of Regions	Dennis Heeney	1,508	19.00	–
Liberal	Steve Wilson	745	9.39	–
Total valid votes		7,938	99.90	–
Rejected		8	0.10	-0.22
Turnout		7,946	69.35	+2.03
Eligible voters		11,457		
Progressive Conservative hold		Swing		+0.92
Source(s) Source: Manitoba. Chief Electoral Officer (1999). Statement of Votes for the 37th Provincial General Election, September 21, 1999 (PDF) (Report). Winnipeg: Elections Manitoba.

=== 1988 ===
1988 Manitoba general election
Party	Candidate	Votes	%	±%
Progressive Conservative	Harold Gilleshammer	3,669	43.36	+1.59
Liberal	Terry Drebit	2,496	29.50	+20.11
New Democratic	Susan Proven	1,476	17.44	-12.40
Confederation of Regions	Dennis Heeney	820	9.69	-9.31
Total valid votes		8,461	99.80	–
Rejected		17	0.20	+0.10
Turnout		8,478	72.12	+2.76
Eligible voters		11,756		
Progressive Conservative hold		Swing		-9.26
Source(s) Source: Manitoba. Chief Electoral Officer (1999). Statement of Votes for the 37th Provincial General Election, September 21, 1999 (PDF) (Report). Winnipeg: Elections Manitoba.

=== 1990 ===
1990 Manitoba general election
Party	Candidate	Votes	%	±%
Progressive Conservative	Harold Gilleshammer	4,294	53.00	+9.64
Liberal	Terry Drebit	2,203	27.19	-2.31
New Democratic	Sean Espey	1,605	19.81	+2.37
Total valid votes		8,102	99.85	–
Rejected		12	0.15	-0.05
Turnout		8,114	64.43	-7.68
Eligible voters		12,593		
Progressive Conservative hold		Swing		+5.97
Source(s) Source: Manitoba. Chief Electoral Officer (1999). Statement of Votes for the 37th Provincial General Election, September 21, 1999 (PDF) (Report). Winnipeg: Elections Manitoba.

=== 1995 ===
1995 Manitoba general election
Party	Candidate	Votes	%	±%
Progressive Conservative	Harold Gilleshammer	4,498	54.58	+1.58
New Democratic	Joe Anderson	2,041	24.77	+4.96
Liberal	Elaine Shuttleworth	1,702	20.65	-6.54
Total valid votes		8,241	99.81	–
Rejected		16	0.19	+0.05
Turnout		8,257	64.62	+0.19
Eligible voters		12,777		
Progressive Conservative hold		Swing		-1.69
Source(s) Source: Manitoba. Chief Electoral Officer (1999). Statement of Votes for the 37th Provincial General Election, September 21, 1999 (PDF) (Report). Winnipeg: Elections Manitoba.

=== 1999 ===
1999 Manitoba general election
Party	Candidate	Votes	%	±%	Expenditures
Progressive Conservative	Harold Gilleshammer	3,744	49.71	-4.87	$20,513.01
New Democratic	Harvey Paterson	2,841	37.72	+12.95	$3,103.00
Liberal	Gordon L. Powell	578	7.67	-12.98	$4,886.09
Manitoba	Brion Pollon	369	4.90	–	$1,062.32
Total valid votes		7,532	99.51	–	
Rejected		37	0.49	+0.30	
Turnout		7,569	62.88	-1.74	
Eligible voters		12,037			
Progressive Conservative hold		Swing		-8.91	
Source(s) Source: Manitoba. Chief Electoral Officer (1999). Statement of Votes for the 37th Provincial General Election, September 21, 1999 (PDF) (Report). Winnipeg: Elections Manitoba.

=== 2003 ===
2003 Manitoba general election
Party	Candidate	Votes	%	±%	Expenditures
Progressive Conservative	Leanne Rowat	3,259	47.37	-2.34	$18,639.72
New Democratic	Harvey Paterson	3,247	47.19	+9.48	$17,900.63
Liberal	Gordon Powell	268	3.90	-3.78	$2,590.10
Independent	Colin Atkins	106	1.54	–	
Total valid votes		6,880	99.67	–	
Rejected		23	0.33	-0.16	
Turnout		6,903	56.15	-6.73	
Eligible voters		12,293			
Progressive Conservative hold		Swing		-5.91	
Source(s) Source: Manitoba. Chief Electoral Officer (2003). Statement of Votes for the 38th Provincial General Election, June 3, 2003 (PDF) (Report). Winnipeg: Elections Manitoba.

=== 2007 ===
2007 Manitoba general election
Party	Candidate	Votes	%	±%	Expenditures
Progressive Conservative	Leanne Rowat	3,790	52.79	+5.42	$22,692.31
New Democratic	Harvey Paterson	2,769	38.57	-8.63	$16,563.22
Green	James Beddome	281	3.91	–	$1,661.53
Liberal	Christopher Baker	268	3.73	-0.16	$340.29
Independent	Colin Atkins	72	1.00	-0.54	$1,218.45
Total valid votes		7,180	99.68	–	
Rejected		23	0.32	-0.01	
Turnout		7,203	58.99	+2.83	
Eligible voters		12,211			
Progressive Conservative hold		Swing		+7.02	
Source(s) Source: Manitoba. Chief Electoral Officer (2007). Statement of Votes for the 39th Provincial General Election, May 22, 2007 (PDF) (Report). Winnipeg: Elections Manitoba.

== See also ==
- List of Manitoba provincial electoral districts
- Canadian provincial electoral districts
