= Pembina (Manitoba provincial electoral district) =

Defunct provincial electoral district in Manitoba, Canada

Coordinates: 49.174°N 98.261°W

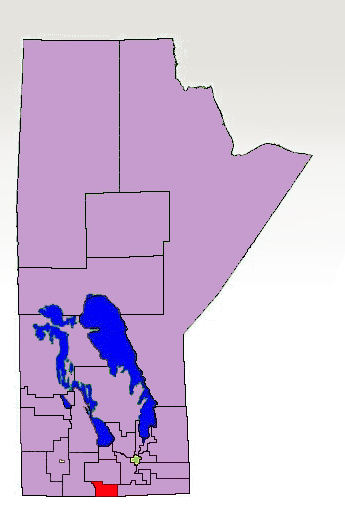
The 1998–2011 boundaries of Pembina highlighted in red

Pembina was a provincial electoral district of Manitoba, Canada.

== 1878–1879 ==
The original riding of Pembina was created in 1878, in what was then the southwestern corner of the province. It was eliminated in 1879. The riding's sole Member of the Legislative Assembly was John Stevenson, who was elected in opposition to John Norquay's government, but supported Norquay's short-lived anglophone ministry in 1879.

== 1958–2011 ==
The most recent Pembina constituency was created by redistribution in 1956, and existed from the 1958 provincial election until the 2011 election.

Pembina was located in the southern part of the province. It was bordered to the north by Carman, to the east by Emerson, to the west by Turtle Mountain, and to the south by the American state of North Dakota.

The main communities in the riding were Morden and Winkler.

Pembina's population in 1996 was 20,177. In 1999, the average family income was $44,624, and the unemployment rate was 5.00%. Manufacturing accounts for 17% of the riding's industry, followed by agriculture at 16%. A quarter of the riding's population has less than a Grade Nine education. Twenty-four per cent of the riding's residents listed German as their ethnic origin, followed by Mennonites at 9% and Dutch at 8%.

The riding was only held by the Progressive Conservative Party, and was considered extremely safe for that party. The last MLA, Peter George Dyck, was re-elected with over 75% of the vote in 2003, despite his party losing other seats across the province.

Following the 2008 electoral redistribution, Pembina was dissolved into Emerson and the newly created ridings of Midland and Morden-Winkler for the 2011 election.

== Members of the Legislative Assembly ==
Name	Party	Took office	Left office
John Stevenson	Opposition/Conservative	1878	1879
John Stevenson	Government/Conservative	1879	1879

Name	Party	Took office	Left office
Maurice Ridley	PC	1958	1960
Carolyne Morrison	PC	1960	1969
George Henderson	PC	1969	1977
Donald Orchard	PC	1977	1995
Peter George Dyck	PC	1995	2011

== Electoral results ==
=== 1878 ===
1878 Manitoba general election: Pembina
Party	Candidate	Votes	%
Undeclared	John Stevenson	111	58.12
Undeclared	Julius Frazelle Galbraith	53	27.75
Undeclared	J. Morris	27	14.14
Total valid votes		191	–
Rejected		N/A	–
Eligible voters / Turnout		1,370	13.94
Source(s) Source: Manitoba. Chief Electoral Officer (1999). Statement of Votes for the 37th Provincial General Election, September 21, 1999 (PDF) (Report). Winnipeg: Elections Manitoba.

=== 1958 ===
1958 Manitoba general election: Pembina
Party	Candidate	Votes	%	±%
Progressive Conservative	Maurice Ridley	2,683	63.99	–
Liberal–Progressive	Kenneth C. Hartwell	1,510	36.01	–
Total valid votes		4,193	–	–
Rejected		43	–	
Eligible voters / Turnout		6,359	66.61	52.67
Source(s) Source: Manitoba. Chief Electoral Officer (1999). Statement of Votes for the 37th Provincial General Election, September 21, 1999 (PDF) (Report). Winnipeg: Elections Manitoba.

=== 1959 ===
1959 Manitoba general election: Pembina
Party	Candidate	Votes	%	±%
Progressive Conservative	Maurice Ridley	3,077	71.96	7.97
Liberal–Progressive	Lynwood Clarence Graham	1,199	28.04	-7.97
Total valid votes		4,276	–	–
Rejected		23	–	
Eligible voters / Turnout		6,469	66.46	-0.16
Source(s) Source: Manitoba. Chief Electoral Officer (1999). Statement of Votes for the 37th Provincial General Election, September 21, 1999 (PDF) (Report). Winnipeg: Elections Manitoba.

=== 1960 by-election ===
Manitoba provincial by-election, 1960: Pembina
Party	Candidate	Votes	%	±%
Progressive Conservative	Carolyne Morrison	2,132	43.21	-28.75
Liberal–Progressive	Charles F. Cousins	1,491	30.22	2.18
Social Credit	Bruce G. Wannop	1,311	26.57	–
Total valid votes		4,934	–	–
Rejected		N/A	–	
Eligible voters / Turnout		N/A	–	–
Source(s) Source: Manitoba. Chief Electoral Officer (1999). Statement of Votes for the 37th Provincial General Election, September 21, 1999 (PDF) (Report). Winnipeg: Elections Manitoba.

=== 1962 ===
1962 Manitoba general election: Pembina
Party	Candidate	Votes	%	±%
Progressive Conservative	Carolyne Morrison	2,436	52.26	9.05
Liberal	Charles F. Cousins	2,225	47.74	–
Total valid votes		4,661	–	–
Rejected		22	–	
Eligible voters / Turnout		6,378	73.42	–
Source(s) Source: Manitoba. Chief Electoral Officer (1999). Statement of Votes for the 37th Provincial General Election, September 21, 1999 (PDF) (Report). Winnipeg: Elections Manitoba.

=== 1966 ===
1966 Manitoba general election: Pembina
Party	Candidate	Votes	%	±%
Progressive Conservative	Carolyne Morrison	2,057	44.63	-7.63
Liberal	Vernon Norris Spangelo	1,545	33.52	-14.22
Social Credit	Frederick Hamm	878	19.05	–
New Democratic	Robert Keith Wallcraft	129	2.80	–
Total valid votes		4,609	–	–
Rejected		48	–	
Eligible voters / Turnout		6,266	74.32	0.90
Source(s) Source: Manitoba. Chief Electoral Officer (1999). Statement of Votes for the 37th Provincial General Election, September 21, 1999 (PDF) (Report). Winnipeg: Elections Manitoba.

=== 1969 ===
1969 Manitoba general election: Pembina
Party	Candidate	Votes	%	±%
Progressive Conservative	George Henderson	2,823	51.37	6.74
Liberal	Kenneth John Draper	1,815	33.03	-0.49
Social Credit	David Harms	521	9.48	-9.57
New Democratic	Edith Alsop	336	6.11	3.32
Total valid votes		5,495	–	–
Rejected		18	–	
Eligible voters / Turnout		8,147	67.67	-6.65
Source(s) Source: Manitoba. Chief Electoral Officer (1999). Statement of Votes for the 37th Provincial General Election, September 21, 1999 (PDF) (Report). Winnipeg: Elections Manitoba.

=== 1973 ===
1973 Manitoba general election: Pembina
Party	Candidate	Votes	%	±%
Progressive Conservative	George Henderson	4,408	63.21	11.83
Liberal	Robert Stewart "Bob" McKenzie	1,553	22.27	-10.76
New Democratic	Paul Klassen	1,013	14.53	8.41
Total valid votes		6,974	–	–
Rejected		41	–	
Eligible voters / Turnout		8,934	78.52	10.85
Source(s) Source: Manitoba. Chief Electoral Officer (1999). Statement of Votes for the 37th Provincial General Election, September 21, 1999 (PDF) (Report). Winnipeg: Elections Manitoba.

=== 1977 ===
1977 Manitoba general election: Pembina
Party	Candidate	Votes	%	±%
Progressive Conservative	Donald Orchard	5,214	69.78	6.57
Liberal	Victor Epp	1,141	15.27	-7.00
New Democratic	Marianne Martin	1,117	14.95	0.42
Total valid votes		7,472	–	–
Rejected		9	–	
Eligible voters / Turnout		9,802	76.32	-2.20
Source(s) Source: Manitoba. Chief Electoral Officer (1999). Statement of Votes for the 37th Provincial General Election, September 21, 1999 (PDF) (Report). Winnipeg: Elections Manitoba.

=== 1981 ===
1981 Manitoba general election: Pembina
Party	Candidate	Votes	%	±%
Progressive Conservative	Donald Orchard	6,361	77.64	7.86
New Democratic	Jeff Taylor	862	10.52	-4.43
Liberal	Ken Popkes	696	8.50	-6.78
Progressive	John Brooks	274	3.34	–
Total valid votes		8,193	–	–
Rejected		20	–	
Eligible voters / Turnout		12,229	67.16	-9.16
Source(s) Source: Manitoba. Chief Electoral Officer (1999). Statement of Votes for the 37th Provincial General Election, September 21, 1999 (PDF) (Report). Winnipeg: Elections Manitoba.

=== 1986 ===
1986 Manitoba general election: Pembina
Party	Candidate	Votes	%	±%
Progressive Conservative	Donald Orchard	5,270	65.19	-12.45
Confederation of Regions	Abe Giesbrecht	944	11.68	–
New Democratic	Edourd Hiebert	913	11.29	0.77
Liberal	Lynn Rempel	849	10.50	2.01
Progressive	John M. Brooks	108	1.34	-2.01
Total valid votes		8,084	–	–
Rejected		5	–	
Eligible voters / Turnout		12,660	63.89	-3.27
Source(s) Source: Manitoba. Chief Electoral Officer (1999). Statement of Votes for the 37th Provincial General Election, September 21, 1999 (PDF) (Report). Winnipeg: Elections Manitoba.

=== 1988 ===
1988 Manitoba general election: Pembina
Party	Candidate	Votes	%	±%
Progressive Conservative	Donald Orchard	6,043	66.44	1.25
Liberal	Marilyn Skubovius	2,171	23.87	13.37
Confederation of Regions	Abe Giesbrecht	499	5.49	-6.19
New Democratic	Hans Wittich	382	4.20	-7.09
Total valid votes		9,095	–	–
Rejected		7	–	
Eligible voters / Turnout		12,823	70.98	7.09
Source(s) Source: Manitoba. Chief Electoral Officer (1999). Statement of Votes for the 37th Provincial General Election, September 21, 1999 (PDF) (Report). Winnipeg: Elections Manitoba.

=== 1990 ===
1990 Manitoba general election: Pembina
Party	Candidate	Votes	%	±%
Progressive Conservative	Donald Orchard	5,497	78.73	12.29
Liberal	Marilyn Skubovis	833	11.93	-11.94
New Democratic	Bert Siemens	652	9.34	5.14
Total valid votes		6,982	–	–
Rejected		28	–	
Eligible voters / Turnout		12,017	58.33	-12.65
Source(s) Source: Manitoba. Chief Electoral Officer (1999). Statement of Votes for the 37th Provincial General Election, September 21, 1999 (PDF) (Report). Winnipeg: Elections Manitoba.

=== 1995 ===
1995 Manitoba general election: Pembina
Party	Candidate	Votes	%	±%
Progressive Conservative	Peter Dyck	5,092	62.28	-16.45
Liberal	Walter Hoeppner	2,632	32.19	20.26
New Democratic	Sean Espey	452	5.53	-3.81
Total valid votes		8,176	–	–
Rejected		32	–	
Eligible voters / Turnout		13,287	61.77	3.44
Source(s) Source: Manitoba. Chief Electoral Officer (1999). Statement of Votes for the 37th Provincial General Election, September 21, 1999 (PDF) (Report). Winnipeg: Elections Manitoba.

=== 1999 ===
1999 Manitoba general election: Pembina
Party	Candidate	Votes	%	±%	Expenditures
Progressive Conservative	Peter Dyck	4,808	69.01	6.73	$22,051.63
New Democratic	Celso Arevalo	1,120	16.08	10.55	$231.00
Liberal	Marilyn Skubovius	1,039	14.91	-17.28	$959.87
Total valid votes		6,967	–	–	
Rejected		42	–		
Eligible voters / turnout		13,336	52.56	-9.22	
Source(s) Source: Manitoba. Chief Electoral Officer (1999). Statement of Votes for the 37th Provincial General Election, September 21, 1999 (PDF) (Report). Winnipeg: Elections Manitoba.

=== 2003 ===
2003 Manitoba general election: Pembina
Party	Candidate	Votes	%	±%	Expenditures
Progressive Conservative	Peter Dyck	4,694	76.24	7.23	$7,710.31
New Democratic	Mary Johnson	877	14.24	-1.83	$716.46
Liberal	Marilyn Skubovius	505	8.20	-6.71	$238.00
Communist	Aaron Crossman	81	1.32	–	$388.23
Total valid votes		6,157	–	–	
Rejected		18	–		
Eligible voters / turnout		14,326	43.10	-9.45	
Source(s) Source: Manitoba. Chief Electoral Officer (2003). Statement of Votes for the 38th Provincial General Election, June 3, 2003 (PDF) (Report). Winnipeg: Elections Manitoba.

=== 2007 ===
2007 Manitoba general election: Pembina
Party	Candidate	Votes	%	±%	Expenditures
Progressive Conservative	Peter Dyck	5,192	77.24	1.00	$12,384.46
New Democratic	Lisa Moore	960	14.28	0.04	$517.81
Liberal	Ralph Gowan	570	8.48	0.28	$2636.35
Total valid votes		6,722	–	–	
Rejected		16	–		
Eligible voters / turnout		14,989	44.95	1.85	
Source(s) Source: Manitoba. Chief Electoral Officer (2007). Statement of Votes for the 39th Provincial General Election, May 22, 2007 (PDF) (Report). Winnipeg: Elections Manitoba.

== See also ==
- List of Manitoba provincial electoral districts
- Canadian provincial electoral districts
