= Manitou–Morden =

Defunct provincial electoral district in Manitoba, Canada

Manitou—Morden is a former provincial electoral district in Manitoba, Canada. It was established for the 1949 provincial election by combining parts of Manitou and Morden-Rhineland, and eliminated by redistribution before the 1958 election. Manitou—Morden was located in the south of the province, and included the community of Morden.

The constituency had two representatives in its nine-year history. The first was Hugh Morrison, who was elected in 1949 as an independent Progressive Conservative opposing Manitoba's coalition government of Liberal-Progressives, Progressive Conservatives and independents. The Progressive Conservatives left the governing coalition in 1950, and Morrison served with the official party caucus in the legislature after this time. He died in 1957, and was succeeded in a by-election by Maurice Ridley. Following redistribution, Ridley was re-elected in Pembina in 1958.

== Members of the Legislative Assembly ==
| Name | Party | Took office | Left office |
| Hugh Morrison | Independent Progressive Conservative | 1949 | 1950 |
| Hugh Morrison | Progressive Conservative | 1950 | 1957 |
| Maurice Ridley | Progressive Conservative | 1957 | 1958 |

== See also ==
- List of Manitoba provincial electoral districts
- Canadian provincial electoral districts
