= Dave Blake =

Canadian politician

David Robert Blake
- Born: March 20, 1925; Rapid City, Manitoba, Canada
- Died: February 25, 2008 (aged 82)
- Occupation: Politician
- Office: Member of the Legislative Assembly of Manitoba (1971–1988)
- Political party: Progressive Conservative

David Robert Blake (March 20, 1925 – February 25, 2008) was a politician in Manitoba, Canada. He was a member of the Legislative Assembly of Manitoba from 1971 to 1988, serving as a member of the Progressive Conservative Party.

Born on the family farm near Rapid City, Manitoba, Blake served in the Royal Canadian Air Force as a navigator from 1943 to 1945, and was in the Sixth Forward Regiment of the Royal Canadian Engineers from 1948 to 1964. He worked for the Royal Bank of Canada, retiring in 1988. Blake was also active in the Royal Canadian Legion, freemasonry and the Manitoba Wildlife Association.

Blake was first elected to the Manitoba legislature in a by-election on November 15, 1971, replacing former Progressive Conservative Premier Walter Weir in the rural riding of Minnedosa. He defeated his nearest opponent Emil Shellborn of the New Democratic Party, by over 1,000 votes. He was later re-elected in the provincial elections of 1973, 1977, 1981 and 1986, usually by about the same margin as in his initial victory.

In 1951, he married Gwen Bergman of Flin Flon and they had 5 children together.
