= John W. Thompson (Manitoba politician) =

Canadian politician (1858–1914)

John W. Thompson (May 31, 1858 – February 4, 1914) was a politician in Manitoba, Canada. He served in the Legislative Assembly of Manitoba from 1910 to 1914, as a member of the Liberal Party.

Thompson was born in Ravenswood, Canada West (now Ontario), the son of Malcolm Thompson and Anne McLarty, and was educated at local public schools. He came to Manitoba with his parents in 1879. Thompson taught school for two years, then worked in the agricultural implement business from 1882 to 1886 and operated a livery business from 1890 to 1895. He served as a lieutenant during the North-West Rebellion of 1885 and was a homestead inspector for the Canadian government in 1897. Thompson later worked as a farmer and resided in Minnedosa, Manitoba during his political career. He also served on the council for Minnedosa. In 1881, Thompson married Annie Smith.

He ran for the House of Commons of Canada in the 1900 federal election as a candidate of the Liberal Party of Canada, but lost to Conservative William James Roche by 422 votes in the Marquette riding.

Thompson was elected to the Manitoba legislature in the 1910 provincial election, defeating Conservative incumbent William B. Waddell by 34 votes in Minnedosa. The Conservatives won the election, and he served as an opposition member. He did not seek re-election in 1914.

Thompson died in Winnipeg at the age of 55.
