= Maurice Ridley =

Canadian politician

Minister of Municipal Affairs
- In office December 21, 1959 – September 30, 1960
- Preceded by: John Thompson
- Succeeded by: Sterling Lyon

Member of the Legislative Assembly of Manitoba for Pembina
- In office November 14, 1957 – October 2, 1960
- Preceded by: Hugh Morrison
- Succeeded by: Carolyne Morrison

Personal details
- Born: February 25, 1915 Manitou, Manitoba, Canada
- Died: October 2, 1960 (aged 45) Manitou, Manitoba, Canada
- Party: Progressive Conservative Party of Manitoba
- Occupation: Farmer

Maurice E. Ridley (February 25, 1915 – October 2, 1960) was a politician in Manitoba, Canada. He served in the Legislative Assembly of Manitoba as a Progressive Conservative from 1957 to 1960, and was a cabinet minister in the government of Dufferin Roblin.

The son of John Sutherland Ridley, he was born in Manitou, Manitoba, and later worked as a cattle buyer. Ridley served in the Canadian Army during World War II. From 1948 to 1957, he was mayor of Manitou.

Ridley was first elected to the legislature in a by-election held on November 14, 1957, in the constituency of Manitou–Morden. He handily defeated his Liberal-Progressive opponent David Lumgair, in a seat that was considered safe for the Progressive Conservative Party.

He was re-elected in the Pembina riding in the 1958 provincial election, in which the Tories under Dufferin Roblin formed a minority government. Ridley was a government backbencher during this period.

Returned again by a landslide in the 1959 election, he was appointed to cabinet on December 21, 1959, as Minister of Municipal Affairs. His time in office was short, as he died in Manitou in late 1960.
