= 1988 Manitoba general election =

← 1986	April 26, 1988	1990 →

57 seats of the Legislative Assembly of Manitoba 29 seats were needed for a majority
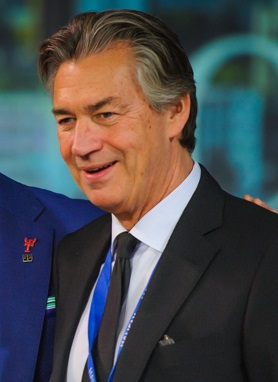
	First party	Second party	Third party
	PC	LIB
Leader	Gary Filmon	Sharon Carstairs	Gary Doer
Party	Progressive Conservative	Liberal	New Democratic
Leader since	December 10, 1983	March 4, 1984	March 30, 1988
Leader's seat	Tuxedo	River Heights	Concordia
Last election	26	1	30
Seats won	25	20	12
Seat change	▼1	▲19	▼18
Popular vote	206,180	190,913	126,954
Percentage	38.37%	35.52%	23.62%
Swing	▼2.19	▲21.60%	▼17.88%
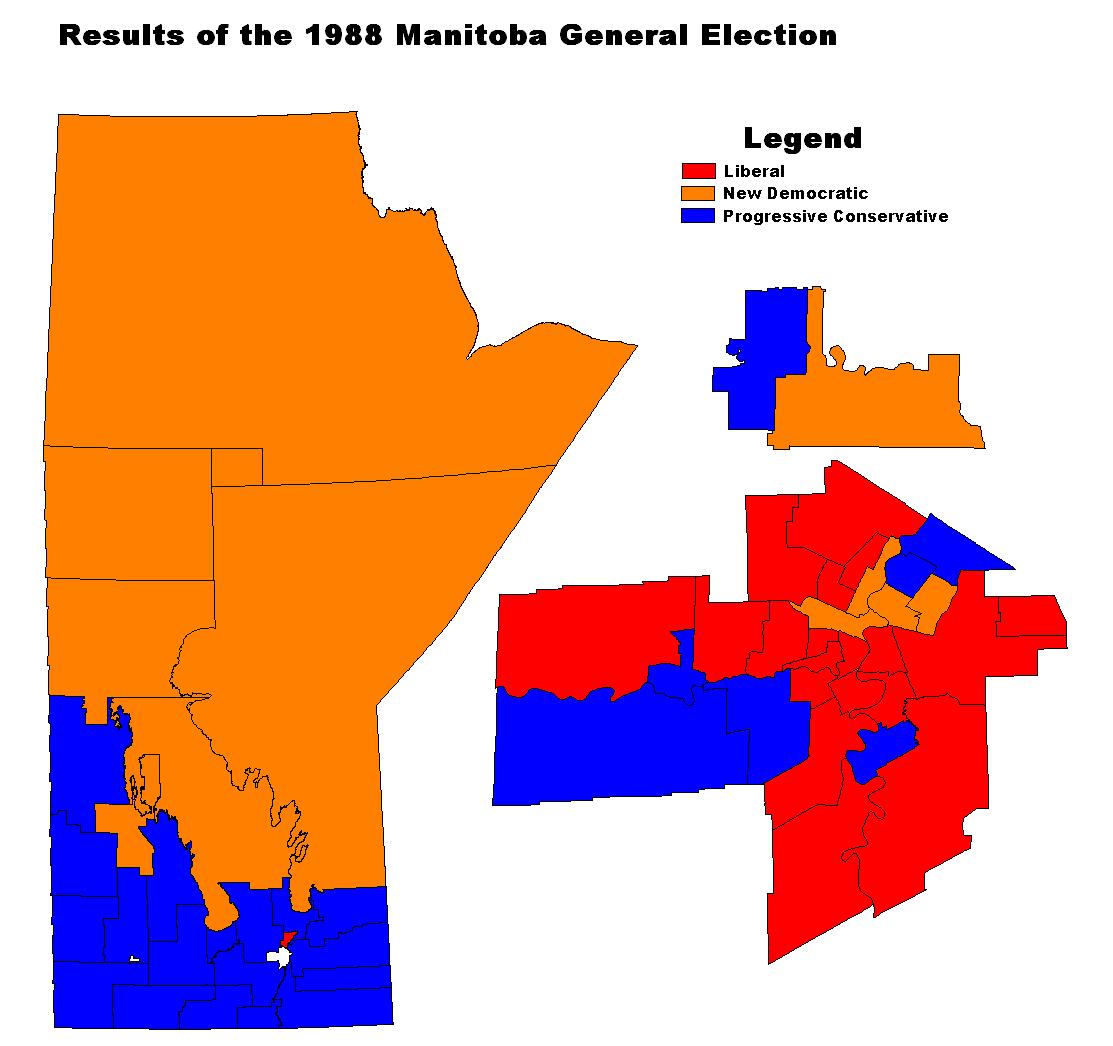
- Map of Election Results
Premier before election
Howard Pawley
New Democratic
Premier after election
Gary Filmon
Progressive Conservative

The 1988 Manitoba general election was held on April 26, 1988 to elect Members of the Legislative Assembly of the Province of Manitoba, Canada. It resulted in a minority government. The Progressive Conservative Party won 25 seats, against 20 for the Liberal Party and 12 for the New Democratic Party. This is the most recent election to have resulted in a minority government in Manitoba, and is the only election between 1966 and 2023 in which the NDP finished third in the seat total.

== Background ==
The election was called unexpectedly in early 1988, after disgruntled NDP backbencher Jim Walding voted against his government's budget on March 9, 1988. With former cabinet minister Laurent Desjardins having essentially abandoned his seat earlier in the year, the Legislative Assembly was almost evenly divided. Walding's defection thus resulted in Howard Pawley's NDP government being defeated, 28 votes to 27. As the budget vote was a confidence measure, the Pawley ministry was forced to resign and call new elections two years ahead of schedule.

Popular support for the NDP was at an historically low level when the election was called, due to soaring Autopac rates and a taxpayer-funded bailout of the Manitoba Telephone System. The Pawley government's support for the Meech Lake Accord was also unpopular in some circles. One internal poll had the party at only 6% support, and there were concerns that they could be reduced to only two or three seats in the 57-seat legislature. Pawley resigned as party leader on the day after the budget defeat, and Urban Affairs Minister Gary Doer narrowly defeated Agriculture Minister Leonard Harapiak to replace him at a party convention held during the campaign.

Pawley himself announced he would enter federal politics and did not seek re-election in his own seat. In an unusual arrangement, the outgoing premier remained in office until after the election. Even after Doer's selection, the consensus was that the NDP would not be reelected. However, they managed to stabilize at around 20% in the polls. Many traditional NDP voters, especially in the city of Winnipeg, abandoned the party to support the Liberals in this cycle.

== Issues ==
The Progressive Conservatives, led by Gary Filmon, ran on a platform of saving revenue by selling public corporations, including ManOil and Manfor. Filmon also promised to scrap the province's Public Investment Corporation entirely. The Liberals also promised more prudent fiscal management, but did not propose to sell these crown corporations. Liberal leader Sharon Carstairs was also known as a prominent opponent of the Meech Lake Accord.

The NDP, which retained a support base in the north of the province, promised to create northern training centres in Thompson and The Pas.

The national abortion debate also surfaced in this campaign, although none of the major parties put forward a clear position on the issue. Although Filmon was personally anti-abortion, the Progressive Conservatives were unwilling to propose specific action on the subject, and withdrew from an early promise to close Henry Morgentaler's private clinic. The Liberals favoured counselling, including a focus on adoption. The NDP emphasized prevention and support services for poorer women who choose to continue their pregnancies.

== Campaign ==
The Progressive Conservatives entered the election with a significant lead in the polls, but saw their support undercut by the Liberals in the campaign's final weeks. Before the party leaders' debate, a Winnipeg Free Press poll indicated that 40% of voters considered Liberal leader Sharon Carstairs as the best choice for Premier, with 24% favouring Progressive Conservative Gary Filmon and 19% favouring NDP leader Gary Doer. 17% were undecided.

Carstairs performed well in the leaders' debate, and did much to improve her party's popularity as the campaign reached its end.

== Results ==
The Liberal Party performed well in Winnipeg, winning 19 out of 29 seats in that city and picking up ridings from both the NDP and Tories, and nearly managed to oust Filmon in his riding of Tuxedo, in south-central Winnipeg. The party won only one seat outside Winnipeg, however—Pawley's former seat of Selkirk, centred on the community of the same name just north of Winnipeg. It was and still is the party's best showing in an election since the then Liberal-Progressives won their last majority in 1953.

In terms of the popular vote, the Progressive Conservatives actually lost support from the last election, however they dominated the rural southern portion of the province, a traditional Tory stronghold. They made some inroads into traditional NDP territory immediately north of Winnipeg. The party also won six seats in Winnipeg, and took the northern seat of Swan River from the NDP.

The New Democrats managed to retain four seats in Winnipeg, five in the north, the mid-northern ridings of Dauphin and Interlake, and Brandon East in the south of the province. It is still the worst defeat that an NDP government has suffered in Manitoba.

Exit polls later revealed that new voters (i.e., immigrants and first-time voters) had polled strongly for the Liberals in Winnipeg.

Although Pawley had retired from politics and his party was reduced to third place, by constitutional convention he retained the right to remain in office until the NDP was defeated in the legislature, as well as the right to advise whether Lieutenant Governor George Johnson should appoint Filmon or Carstairs as the new premier upon leaving office. Doer also could have attempted to negotiate a coalition with the Liberals. Instead, he informally reached a deal with Filmon in which the NDP would tolerate a Tory minority government. As a result, Pawley finally resigned as Premier of Manitoba on May 9 and advised Johnson to appoint Filmon his successor. Filmon was duly sworn in later that day after advising Johnson that he could form a government.

Party	Party Leader	# of candidates	Seats			Popular Vote		
Party	Party Leader	# of candidates	Before^{1}	Elected	% Change	#	%	Change
Progressive Conservative	Gary Filmon	57	26	25	-3.85%	206,180	38.37%	-2.19
Liberal	Sharon Carstairs	57	1	20	+1900%	190,913	35.52%	+21.60
New Democratic	Gary Doer	57	30	12	-60.0%	126,954	23.62%	-17.88
Confederation of Regions	Dennis Heeney	14	-	-	-	7,100	1.32%	-1.12
Western Independence	Fred Cameron	16	-	-	-	2,442	0.45%	+0.45
Progressive	Sidney Green	6	-	-	-	975	0.18%	-0.33
Libertarian	Clancy Smith	6	-	-	-	501	0.09%	+0.09
Communist	Lorne Robson	5	-	-	-	261	0.05%	-0.03
Independent		11	2	-	-100%	2,084	0.39%	-0.46
Total		229	57	57	-	537,410	100%	

^{1} "Before" refers to standings in the Legislature at dissolution, and not to the results of the previous election. These numbers therefore reflect changes in party standings as a result of by-elections and members crossing the floor.

=== Vote and seat summaries ===
Ternary plots – shift of electoral support (1986–1988)
1986

1988
Electoral districts identified by colours of winning parties

Popular vote
PC	38.37%
Liberal	35.52%
New Democratic	23.62%
Others	2.49%

Seats summary
PC	43.86%
Liberal	35.09%
New Democratic	21.05%

=== Synopsis of results ===
1988 Manitoba general election – synopsis of riding results
Electoral division	Winning party							Votes (Note: All parties with more than 1% of the vote are shown individually. Independent candidates and other minor parties are aggregated separately.)						
Electoral division	1986	1st place	Votes	Share	Margin #	Margin %	2nd place	PC	Lib	NDP	CoR	Ind	Oth	Total
Arthur	PC	PC	4,359	54.71%	2,188	27.46%	Lib	4,359	2,171	575	863	–	–	7,968
Assiniboia	PC	Lib	3,918	44.29%	187	2.11%	PC	3,731	3,918	1,031	–	–	166	8,846
Brandon East	NDP	NDP	3,512	39.73%	653	7.39%	PC	2,859	2,260	3,512	–	208	–	8,839
Brandon West	PC	PC	5,039	45.93%	1,421	12.95%	Lib	5,039	3,618	2,313	–	–	–	10,970
Burrows	NDP	Lib	3,114	42.27%	109	1.48%	NDP	1,040	3,114	3,005	–	129	79	7,367
Charleswood	PC	PC	6,670	48.13%	820	5.92%	Lib	6,670	5,850	1,180	–	158	–	13,858
Churchill	NDP	NDP	2,396	58.03%	1,377	33.35%	PC	1,019	714	2,396	–	–	–	4,129
Concordia	NDP	NDP	3,702	37.71%	754	7.68%	Lib	2,634	2,948	3,702	–	358	175	9,817
Dauphin	NDP	NDP	3,983	40.26%	548	5.54%	PC	3,435	2,475	3,983	–	–	–	9,893
Ellice	NDP	Lib	3,081	42.88%	624	8.68%	NDP	1,538	3,081	2,457	–	–	109	7,185
Elmwood	NDP	NDP	3,012	38.20%	173	2.19%	Lib	1,920	2,839	3,012	–	–	113	7,884
Emerson	PC	PC	5,027	53.39%	2,412	25.62%	Lib	5,027	2,615	1,407	366	–	–	9,415
Flin Flon	NDP	NDP	2,948	54.82%	1,385	25.75%	PC	1,563	867	2,948	–	–	–	5,378
Fort Garry	PC	Lib	6,055	46.58%	882	6.79%	PC	5,173	6,055	1,553	–	–	218	12,999
Fort Rouge	NDP	Lib	5,127	48.91%	2,215	21.13%	NDP	2,303	5,127	2,912	–	–	141	10,483
Gimli	NDP	PC	4,716	44.17%	1,364	12.78%	NDP	4,716	2,347	3,352	–	–	261	10,676
Gladstone	PC	PC	3,760	52.51%	1,628	22.74%	Lib	3,760	2,132	509	759	–	–	7,160
Inkster	NDP	Lib	4,466	41.43%	368	3.41%	NDP	2,151	4,466	4,098	–	–	64	10,779
Interlake	NDP	NDP	3,057	39.99%	247	3.23%	PC	2,810	1,777	3,057	–	–	–	7,644
Kildonan	NDP	Lib	5,653	35.69%	585	3.69%	PC	5,068	5,653	4,542	–	–	578 (Note: Sidney Green, previously elected as an NDP MLA, ran as a Progressive candidate and received 445 votes.)	15,841
Kirkfield Park	PC	PC	5,269	47.25%	255	2.29%	Lib	5,269	5,014	868	–	–	–	11,151
La Vérendrye	PC	PC	4,377	54.49%	1,429	17.79%	Lib	4,377	2,948	708	–	–	–	8,033
Lac du Bonnet	NDP	PC	3,773	41.48%	862	9.48%	NDP	3,773	2,411	2,911	–	–	–	9,095
Lakeside	PC	PC	4,475	48.97%	1,647	18.02%	Lib	4,475	2,828	972	864	–	–	9,139
Logan	NDP	NDP	2,646	47.95%	986	17.87%	Lib	1,085	1,660	2,646	–	81	46	5,518
Minnedosa	PC	PC	3,669	43.36%	1,173	13.86%	Lib	3,669	2,496	1,476	820	–	–	8,461
Morris	PC	PC	4,578	60.93%	2,746	36.55%	Lib	4,578	1,832	449	597	57	–	7,513
Niakwa	PC	Lib	8,576	47.48%	1,354	7.50%	PC	7,222	8,576	2,026	–	–	237	18,061
Osborne	NDP	Lib	4,334	44.90%	1,581	16.38%	NDP	2,421	4,334	2,753	–	–	145	9,653
Pembina	PC	PC	6,043	66.44%	3,872	42.57%	Lib	6,043	2,171	382	499	–	–	9,095
Portage la Prairie	PC	PC	4,020	49.28%	1,208	14.81%	Lib	4,020	2,812	722	603	–	–	8,157
Radisson	NDP	Lib	4,918	44.39%	1,805	16.29%	NDP	3,049	4,918	3,113	–	–	–	11,080
Rhineland	PC	PC	5,166	78.68%	4,107	62.55%	Lib	5,166	1,059	341	–	–	–	6,566
Riel	PC	PC	4,289	41.71%	324	3.15%	Lib	4,289	3,965	1,834	121	–	75	10,284
River East	PC	PC	7,563	51.73%	3,758	25.70%	Lib	7,563	3,805	3,019	–	–	233	14,620
River Heights	Lib	Lib	6,620	59.69%	3,247	29.28%	PC	3,373	6,620	1,036	–	–	62	11,091
Roblin-Russell	PC	PC	4,030	47.32%	1,517	17.81%	Lib	4,030	2,513	1,973	–	–	–	8,516
Rossmere	NDP	PC	3,950	38.09%	526	5.07%	NDP	3,950	2,851	3,424	–	–	146	10,371
Rupertsland	NDP	NDP	2,206	51.75%	787	18.46%	PC	1,419	638	2,206	–	–	–	4,263
Selkirk	NDP	Lib	3,821	35.35%	184	1.70%	NDP	3,138	3,821	3,637	–	–	214	10,810
Seven Oaks	NDP	Lib	3,885	42.81%	332	3.66%	NDP	1,636	3,885	3,553	–	–	–	9,074
Springfield	PC	PC	5,815	43.49%	2,009	15.03%	Lib	5,815	3,806	3,749	–	–	–	13,370
St. Boniface	NDP	Lib	5,743	61.16%	3,682	39.21%	NDP	1,586	5,743	2,061	–	–	–	9,390
St. James	NDP	Lib	3,939	40.14%	579	5.90%	PC	3,360	3,939	2,171	137	–	205	9,812
St. Johns	NDP	NDP	3,092	43.75%	612	8.66%	Lib	1,222	2,480	3,092	–	103	171	7,068
St. Norbert	PC	Lib	6,073	45.91%	378	2.86%	PC	5,695	6,073	1,460	–	–	–	13,228
St. Vital	NDP	Lib	4,431	42.22%	817	7.78%	PC	3,614	4,431	2,282	–	–	169	10,496
Ste. Rose	PC	PC	3,723	46.15%	1,092	13.54%	Lib	3,723	2,631	1,464	249	–	–	8,067
Sturgeon Creek	PC	Lib	4,833	47.45%	659	6.47%	PC	4,174	4,833	993	158	–	27	10,185
Swan River	NDP	PC	4,115	50.10%	669	8.14%	NDP	4,115	653	3,446	–	–	–	8,214
The Pas	NDP	NDP	3,221	51.69%	1,637	26.27%	PC	1,584	1,426	3,221	–	–	–	6,231
Thompson	NDP	NDP	2,992	48.10%	1,003	16.12%	PC	1,989	1,240	2,992	–	–	–	6,221
Transcona	NDP	Lib	3,900	41.13%	709	7.48%	NDP	2,270	3,900	3,191	–	121	–	9,482
Turtle Mountain	PC	PC	3,208	41.68%	598	7.77%	Lib	3,208	2,610	446	476	869	87	7,696
Tuxedo	PC	PC	6,427	47.28%	124	0.91%	Lib	6,427	6,303	714	–	–	149	13,593
Virden	PC	PC	4,459	54.27%	2,416	29.40%	Lib	4,459	2,043	967	588	–	160	8,217
Wolseley	NDP	Liberal	3,618	42.78%	506	5.98%	NDP	1,579	3,618	3,112	–	–	149	8,458

= open seat
= winning candidate was in previous Legislature
= incumbent had switched allegiance
= not incumbent; was previously elected to the Legislature
= other incumbents renominated
= previously an MP in the House of Commons of Canada
= multiple candidates

=== Turnout, winning shares and swings ===
Summary of riding results by turnout, vote share for winning candidate, and swing (vs 1986)
Riding and winning party			Turnout		Vote share (Note: Share won by winning candidate, with difference noted from share achieved by the same party in 1986.)		Swing (Note: Positive indicates improvement to standing of party winning in 1986; negative points to 1986's second-place party being swung to.)	
Riding and winning party			%	Change (pp)	%	Change (pp)	To	Change (pp)
Arthur	PC	Hold	72.01	4.90	54.71	-6.40	CoR	-0.60
Assiniboia	Lib	Gain	74.46	10.41	44.29	25.62	PC	4.31
Brandon East	NDP	Hold	75.37	8.35	39.73	-13.14	PC	-2.57
Brandon West	PC	Hold	72.54	1.61	45.93	-7.18	PC	5.67
Burrows	Lib	Gain	66.05	4.45	42.27	33.49	N/A (Note: William Chornopyski, who campaigned as an Independent in 1986 and finished second, stood as a Liberal in 1988 and won.)	
Charleswood	PC	Hold	80.06	10.54	48.13	-8.30	PC	3.81
Churchill	NDP	Hold	62.23	1.18	58.03	-15.47	PC	-9.36
Concordia	NDP	Hold	76.43	10.21	37.71	-16.66	PC	-5.62
Dauphin	NDP	Hold	83.73	5.03	40.26	-12.01	PC	-6.67
Ellice	Lib	Gain	71.78	5.42	42.88	29.45	PC	-9.93
Elmwood	NDP	Hold	67.98	3.65	38.20	-7.63	N/A (Note: Russell Doern, who campaigned as an Independent in 1986 and came in second, decided not to run in 1988.)	
Emerson	PC	Hold	72.36	-0.63	53.39	1.64	PC	13.91
Flin Flon	NDP	Hold	62.42	6.03	54.82	-14.67	PC	-10.64
Fort Garry	Lib	Gain	78.22	11.99	46.58	26.68	PC	4.57
Fort Rouge	Lib	Gain	69.95	5.62	48.91	29.44	PC	-6.54
Gimli	PC	Gain	78.94	3.77	44.17	3.19	PC	-11.32
Gladstone	PC	Hold	64.36	1.74	52.51	3.26	PC	9.03
Inkster	Lib	Gain	69.45	9.20	41.43	30.46	PC	-12.92
Interlake	NDP	Hold	67.59	1.51	39.99	-21.31	PC	-14.61
Kildonan	Lib	Gain	76.48	13.01	35.69	26.24	PC	-9.95
Kirkfield Park	PC	Hold	79.81	11.19	47.25	-9.89	PC	2.55
La Vérendrye	PC	Hold	59.78	9.36	54.49	-4.63	PC	7.72
Lac du Bonnet	PC	Gain	77.47	3.53	41.48	-1.07	PC	-6.52
Lakeside	PC	Hold	70.45	-0.60	48.97	-0.41	PC	8.25
Logan	NDP	Hold	61.35	5.35	47.95	-25.13	PC	-14.72
Minnedosa	PC	Hold	72.12	2.76	43.36	1.59	PC	6.99
Morris	PC	Hold	69.24	9.51	60.93	-7.85	PC	2.04
Niakwa	Lib	Gain	79.64	8.07	47.48	30.53	PC	8.47
Osborne	Lib	Gain	78.85	9.69	44.90	30.21	PC	-12.28
Pembina	PC	Hold	70.98	7.09	66.44	1.25	PC	3.72
Portage la Prairie	PC	Hold	71.70	6.67	49.28	-2.07	PC	4.67
Radisson	Lib	Gain	77.49	7.94	44.39	30.55	PC	-11.68
Rhineland	PC	Hold	53.41	2.91	78.68	27.33	PC	24.16
Riel	PC	Hold	77.88	3.64	41.71	-5.40	PC	7.89
River East	PC	Hold	77.17	3.73	51.73	2.85	PC	12.76
River Heights	Lib	Hold	87.07	6.42	59.69	14.71	Lib	7.41
Roblin-Russell	PC	Hold	78.90	0.30	47.32	9.23	PC	11.85
Rossmere	PC	Gain	83.63	5.72	38.09	-3.58	PC	-5.22
Rupertsland	NDP	Hold	43.15	1.19	51.75	-8.67	PC	-8.76
Selkirk	Lib	Gain	80.46	5.53	35.35	24.40	PC	-8.47
Seven Oaks	Lib	Gain	72.37	9.02	42.81	31.44	PC	-10.24
Springfield	PC	Hold	77.73	4.40	43.49	-0.77	PC	7.49
St. Boniface	Lib	Gain	79.77	10.04	61.16	37.34	Lib	-38.08
St. James	Lib	Gain	78.54	6.05	40.14	30.25	PC	-6.89
St. Johns	NDP	Hold	66.52	4.10	43.75	-12.64	PC	-0.32
St. Norbert	Lib	Gain	76.95	8.07	45.91	21.51	PC	3.09
St. Vital	Lib	Gain	79.08	5.27	42.22	27.16	PC	-9.20
Ste. Rose	PC	Hold	71.01	-1.64	46.15	0.38	PC	9.62
Sturgeon Creek	Lib	Gain	76.73	9.29	47.45	30.55	PC	1.30
Swan River	PC	Gain	83.92	3.74	50.10	3.04	PC	-4.48
The Pas	NDP	Hold	73.08	4.90	51.69	-16.64	PC	-11.86
Thompson	NDP	Hold	73.16	1.66	48.10	-18.51	PC	-12.29
Transcona	Lib	Gain	77.72	12.16	41.13	25.74	PC	-12.23
Turtle Mountain	PC	Hold	74.70	5.47	41.68	-5.83	PC	3.67
Tuxedo	PC	Hold	79.77	7.93	47.28	-1.81	Lib	-7.58
Virden	PC	Hold	70.43	2.58	54.27	1.27	PC	5.66
Wolseley	Lib	Gain	74.44	8.50	42.78	28.57	PC	-2.74

=== Changes in party shares ===
Share change analysis by party and riding (1988 vs 1986)
Riding	CoR		Liberal		NDP		PC	
Riding	%	Change (pp)	%	Change (pp)	%	Change (pp)	%	Change (pp)
Arthur	10.83	-5.19	27.25	17.87	7.22	-6.28	54.71	-6.40
Assiniboia			44.29	25.62	11.65	-18.06	42.18	-9.44
Brandon East			25.57	18.79	39.73	-13.14	32.35	-8.00
Brandon West			32.98	25.69	21.08	-18.51	45.93	-7.18
Burrows			42.27	33.49	40.79	-12.25	14.12	-0.09
Charleswood			42.21	23.09	8.51	-15.93	48.13	-8.30
Churchill			17.29	12.22	58.03	-15.47	24.68	3.25
Concordia			30.03	19.11	37.71	-16.66	26.83	-5.42
Dauphin			25.02	10.67	40.26	-12.01	34.72	1.33
Ellice			42.88	29.45	34.20	-23.47	21.41	-3.62
Elmwood			36.01	30.51	38.20	-7.63	24.35	4.06
Emerson	3.89	3.89	27.77	20.64	14.94	-26.17	53.39	1.64
Flin Flon			16.12	8.07	54.82	-14.67	29.06	6.60
Fort Garry			46.58	26.68	11.95	-17.78	39.80	-8.65
Fort Rouge			48.91	29.44	27.78	-21.08	21.97	-8.00
Gimli			21.98	15.26	31.40	-19.44	44.17	3.19
Gladstone	10.60	-14.79	29.78	17.05	7.11	-5.52	52.51	3.26
Inkster			41.43	30.46	38.02	-26.08	19.96	-0.23
Interlake	–	-3.82	23.25	17.23	39.99	-21.31	36.76	7.91
Kildonan			35.69	26.24	28.67	-22.98	31.99	-3.08
Kirkfield Park			44.96	24.88	7.78	-14.99	47.25	-9.89
La Vérendrye			36.70	24.71	8.81	-20.08	54.49	-4.63
Lac du Bonnet			26.51	15.18	32.01	-14.11	41.48	-1.07
Lakeside	9.45	-2.62	30.94	19.94	10.64	-16.91	48.97	-0.41
Logan			30.08	20.34	47.95	-25.13	19.66	4.31
Minnedosa	9.69	-9.31	29.50	20.11	17.44	-12.40	43.36	1.59
Morris	7.95	7.95	24.38	11.08	5.98	-11.93	60.93	-7.85
Niakwa			47.48	30.53	11.22	-24.39	39.99	-7.46
Osborne			44.90	30.21	28.52	-26.86	25.08	-2.31
Pembina	5.49	-6.19	23.87	13.37	4.20	-7.09	66.44	1.25
Portage la Prairie	7.39	-7.54	34.47	21.01	8.85	-11.41	49.28	-2.07
Radisson			44.39	30.55	28.10	-25.62	27.52	-2.25
Rhineland			16.13	-6.34	5.19	-20.99	78.68	27.33
Riel	1.18	-0.79	38.56	26.64	17.83	-21.18	41.71	-5.40
River East	–	-2.07	26.03	20.87	20.65	-22.68	51.73	2.85
River Heights			59.69	14.71	9.34	-15.16	30.41	-0.11
Roblin-Russell			29.51	5.24	23.17	-14.47	47.32	9.23
Rossmere			27.49	16.19	33.02	-14.02	38.09	-3.58
Rupertsland			14.97	-0.18	51.75	-8.67	33.29	8.85
Selkirk			35.35	24.40	33.64	-21.28	29.03	-4.33
Seven Oaks			42.81	31.44	39.16	-25.55	18.03	-5.07
Springfield			28.47	16.51	28.04	-15.74	43.49	-0.77
St. Boniface			61.16	37.34	21.95	-38.82	16.89	3.29
St. James	1.40	-0.48	40.14	30.25	22.13	-22.09	34.24	-8.31
St. Johns			35.09	25.59	43.75	-12.64	17.29	-11.99
St. Norbert			45.91	21.51	11.04	-13.84	43.05	-7.67
St. Vital			42.22	27.16	21.74	-23.58	34.43	-5.18
Ste. Rose	3.09	-2.48	32.61	20.95	18.15	-18.86	46.15	0.38
Sturgeon Creek	1.55	1.55	47.45	30.55	9.75	-16.79	40.98	-14.19
Swan River			7.95	2.89	41.95	-5.93	50.10	3.04
The Pas			22.89	9.58	51.69	-16.64	25.42	7.07
Thompson			19.93	12.45	48.10	-18.51	31.97	6.07
Transcona			41.13	25.74	33.65	-25.74	23.94	-1.27
Turtle Mountain	6.19	-9.93	33.91	16.51	5.80	-13.17	41.68	-5.83
Tuxedo			46.37	13.35	5.25	-11.67	47.28	-1.81
Virden	7.16	-11.51	24.86	18.33	11.77	-10.05	54.27	1.27
Wolseley			42.78	28.57	36.79	-14.63	18.67	-9.16

= did not field a candidate in 1986

== Post-election changes ==
Gilles Roch (Springfield) became a Liberal on September 8, 1988.

== Opinion polls ==
Evolution of voting intentions at provincial level
Polling firm	Last day of survey	Source	PCMB	MLP	MNDP	Other	ME	Sample
Election 1988	April 26, 1988		38.37	35.52	23.62	2.49		
University of Manitoba Research Ltd.	February 1988		50.4	22.8	25.4	—	—	—
University of Manitoba Research Ltd.	October 10, 1987		36.7	23.3	37.3	—	3.0	1,090
University of Manitoba Research Ltd.	June 1987		35.9	18.7	40.3	—	3.0	1,005
Western Opinion Research	April 1987		36	28	33	—	4.5	500
University of Manitoba Research Ltd.	February 1987		32.4	16.6	45.6	—	3.0	988
Election 1986	March 18, 1986		40.56	13.92	41.50	4.02		

Polling firm	Last date of polling	PC	Liberal	NDP	Others	Sample size	Margin of error	Polling method
Angus Reid	April 12, 1988	43	34	22	1	818	3.5%	Telephone
Angus Reid	March 14, 1988	48	32	19	1	806	3.5%	Telephone
U of M	October 10, 1987	36.7	23.3	37.3	2.7	1,090	3.0%	Telephone
Western Opinion	March 26, 1987	36	28	33	3	500	4.5%	Telephone

== See also ==
- List of Manitoba political parties
