= George Grierson (politician) =

Canadian politician

George Allison Grierson (April 11, 1867–October 18, 1931) was a politician in Manitoba, Canada. He served in the Legislative Assembly of Manitoba from 1914 to 1922, and was a cabinet minister in the government of Tobias Norris. Grierson was a member of the Liberal Party.

== Biography ==
Grierson was born in Brantford, Canada West (now Ontario), the son of George Grierson and Margaret Edmundson, and was educated in that city and in Winnipeg. Grierson received a teaching certificate and served as principal of the Minnedosa public school from 1887 to 1890 and from 1892 to 1902. In 1892, he married Christina Matheson. He also worked as a financial agent. Grierson served as a town councillor in Minnedosa and was mayor of the city from 1914 to 1915.

He ran for the House of Commons of Canada in the 1911 federal election as a candidate of the Liberal Party of Canada in Marquette, but lost to Conservative William James Roche, 3,409 votes to 3,283.

Grierson was first elected to the Manitoba legislature in the 1914 provincial election, defeating Conservative candidate William B. Waddell in Minnedosa by 209 votes. This election saw Premier Rodmond Roblin's Conservatives elected to a fifth term in office, and Grierson sat with his party on the opposition benches. He served as Liberal whip in the assembly.

Early in 1915, the Conservatives were forced to resign from office in the wake of a serious corruption scandal. The Liberals won a landslide majority government in the election which followed, with Grierson defeating Conservative candidate James Muir by 219 votes. On November 10, 1917, Grierson was appointed to cabinet as Minister of Public Works.

The Liberals were reduced to a minority government in the 1920 provincial election, amid the rise of organized Farmer and Labour groups. Grierson was personally re-elected, defeating Farmer candidate W.T. Bielby by 267 votes. He withdrew from cabinet on January 10, 1921, and did not seek re-election in 1922.

Grierson died in Minnedosa, Manitoba in 1931.
