= William B. Waddell (politician) =

Canadian politician (1857–1942)

William Bramwell Waddell (January 4, 1857—January 13, 1942) was a politician in Manitoba, Canada. He served in the Legislative Assembly of Manitoba from 1903 to 1910, as a member of the Conservative Party.

Waddell was born at Harrow in Essex County, Canada West (now Ontario), the son of James Waddell. He was educated in that community, and later moved to Manitoba where he worked as a farmer. In religion, Waddell was a Presbyterian. In 1885, he married A.E. Sanderson.

He was first elected to the Manitoba legislature in the 1903 provincial election, defeating Liberal candidate Neil Cameron by 81 votes in Minnedosa. The Conservatives won a majority government under Rodmond Roblin, and Waddell served in the legislature as a government backbencher. He was re-elected in the 1907 election, but lost to Liberal John Thompson by 44 votes in 1910.

He attempted to return to the legislature in the 1914 election, but lost to Liberal George Grierson by 209 votes.

Waddell was reeve for the Rural Municipality of Clanwilliam in 1901 and for the Rural Municipality of Minto in 1903. In 1918, he moved to Winnipeg and then, in 1927, to Middlechurch. Waddell died at home in Middlechurch at the age of 85.
