= John Thompson (Manitoba politician) =

Canadian politician

The Honourable John Thompson QC
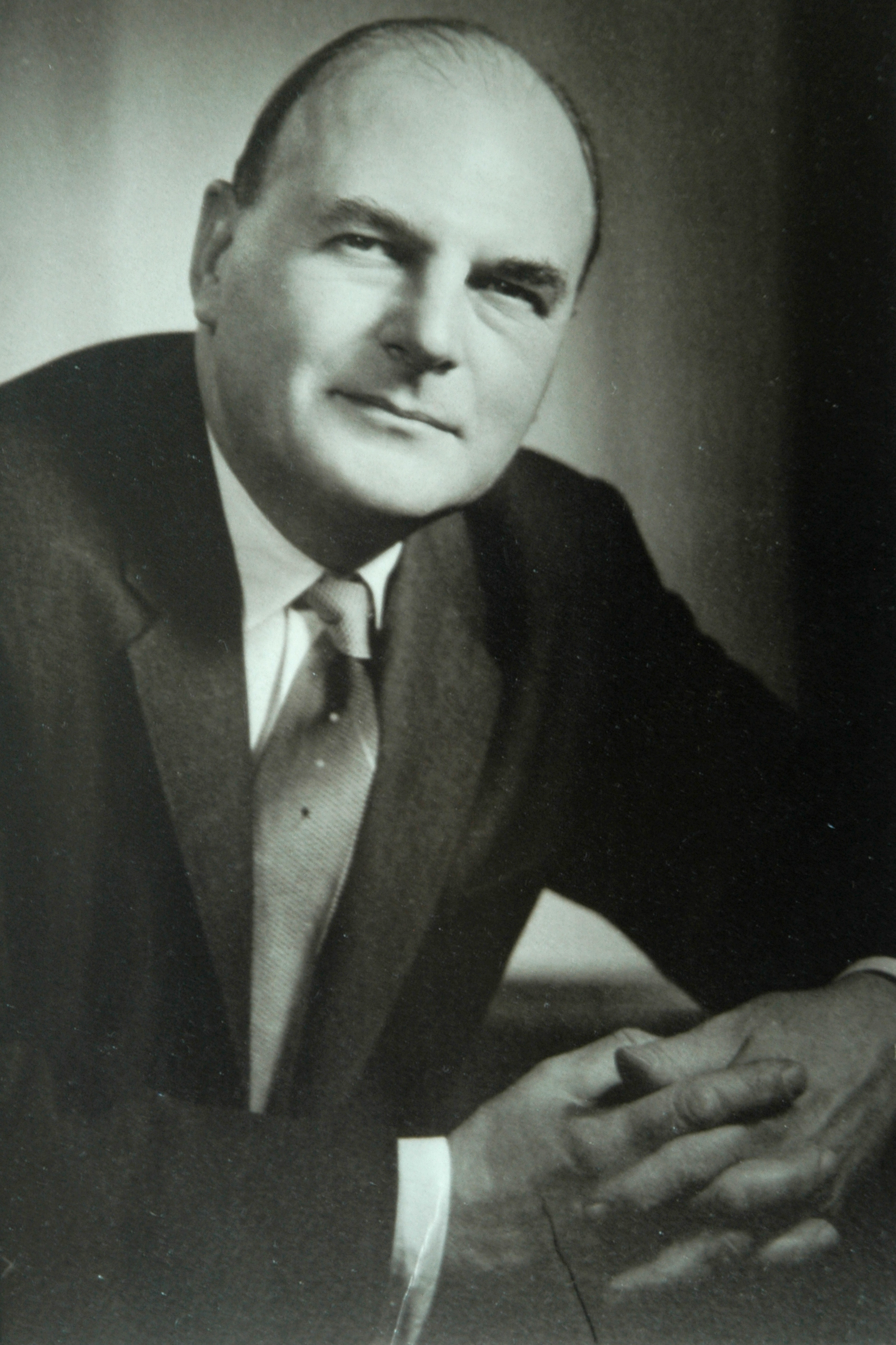

Manitoba Minister of Public Works
- In office December 21, 1959 – October 24, 1962
- Premier: Dufferin Roblin
- Preceded by: Errick Willis
- Succeeded by: Walter Weir

Manitoba Minister of Municipal Affairs
- In office June 30, 1958 – December 21, 1959
- Premier: Dufferin Roblin
- Preceded by: Edmond Prefontaine
- Succeeded by: Maurice Ridley

Manitoba Labour Minister
- In office June 30, 1958 – December 21, 1959
- Premier: Dufferin Roblin
- Preceded by: Charles Edwin Greenlay
- Succeeded by: John Benson Carroll

15th Mayor of Elkhorn, Manitoba
- In office 1947–1953
- Preceded by: C.W. Johnston
- Succeeded by: J.W. Clarke

Personal details
- Born: 18 July 1908 Elkhorn, Manitoba
- Died: 15 December 1986 (aged 78) Winnipeg, Manitoba
- Resting place: Elkhorn Cemetery, Elkhorn, Manitoba
- Party: Progressive Conservative
- Education: Brandon College; University of Manitoba
- Profession: Lawyer

John William McLeod Thompson QC (July 18, 1908 in Elkhorn, Manitoba – December 15, 1986 in Winnipeg) was a lawyer, politician and judge in Manitoba, Canada. He served in the Legislative Assembly of Manitoba from 1953 to 1962 as a Progressive Conservative, and held several cabinet posts in the government of Dufferin (Duff) Roblin.

== Education and local politics ==
Thompson attended Brandon College from 1925 and graduated with a Bachelor of Arts in 1929, giving the valedictory address. While at Brandon he was classmates with Tommy Douglas and Stanley Knowles (both class of 1930). He then went on to study law at the University of Manitoba, graduating in 1933 with an LLB. While there he was a member of the top debating team with his debating partner and the future Co-operative Commonwealth Federation (CCF) leader Lloyd Stinson.

After graduation, he settled back in Elkhorn and built up his law practice. Active in the Elkhorn community, Thompson was a municipal councillor from 1933 to 1939. Turning to national politics, he campaigned in the 1940 federal election as a "National Government" (i.e., Conservative) candidate, but lost to the Liberal, James Ewen Matthews.

Shortly after marrying Lorraine Dutton of Virden in 1942, Thompson joined the Royal Canadian Air Force and for three years was a leading airman during the Second World War. After the war, Thompson again focused on local politics in Elkhorn and was elected as a school trustee from 1945 to 1947, and then spent six years as Mayor of Elkhorn from 1947 to 1953 (his father, Wellington John Thompson, had also been Mayor of Elkhorn in 1922, and was editor of the local newspaper, The Elkhorn Advocate).

== Member of the Legislative Assembly for Virden ==
Thompson was first elected to the Manitoba legislature in the June 1953 provincial election as the Progressive Conservative member for Virden. Despite the Liberal-Progressives winning a majority under Douglas L. Campbell, Thompson, with 57% of the vote, had defeated G.A. Mooney to become the first Tory to serve Virden since 1914. Joining the opposition benches, Thompson soon established himself as one of the best speakers in the House. When Duff Roblin assumed the party leadership the following year, Thompson was a key voice of the opposition attacks during the 1956 beer price debate, the oil lease scandal of 1957, and was a sharp critic on penal reform.

== In the Manitoba Cabinet ==
The Progressive Conservatives took power in 1958 after winning a minority government under Roblin. With 64% of the vote Thompson was re-elected in a redistributed Virden constituency, where he defeated the Liberal-Progressive incumbent Francis C. Bell. As the Tories assumed office on June 30, 1958, Thompson was a surprise choice by Roblin for Minister of Labour. Having had no experience in labour relations, Thompson had been tipped as a possible choice for Attorney-General, which instead went to Sterling Lyon. However, Roblin saw in Thompson a "born conciliator" who "never failed to deliver a cogent and effective argument". As Minister of Labour, Thompson declared his major task as the "welfare of the worker". He was also named Minister of Municipal Affairs.

At the end of March 1959, following heated debates regarding the upcoming fiscal budget, the government lost the confidence of the legislature and fresh elections were called for June. Easily re-elected in the May 1959 election with 68% of the Virden vote, Thompson continued to hold his Labour and Municipal Affairs portfolios.

As the end of 1959 approached, Roblin and the Deputy Premier and former party leader Errick Willis were discussing the timing of Willis' departure and next post. Willis resigned his office on December 21, 1959, and Roblin then appointed Thompson to move from Labour and pick up the Public Works portfolio. Three weeks later, Willis was appointed as Lieutenant Governor of Manitoba. Thompson stayed as Minister of Public Works for the remainder of his time in office.

At Public Works Thompson then led the largest Canadian peacetime highway construction to that time, with a $34 million budget for 1960-61 that included the completion of the Trans Canada Highway, the Perimeter Road and Pembina Bypass, and hundreds of miles of new roads and bridges across the province. Thompson is recognized on the plaque at Rogers Pass, celebrating the opening of the Trans Canada Highway in 1962, was a leader of the Canadian Good Roads Association and a Life Member of the Roads and Transportation Association of Canada.

== Leaving Politics, Royal Commission, and Later Life ==
As an election drew near in fall 1962, and after nine years in the Legislature, Thompson decided not to seek re-election. He resigned his portfolio and his seat on October 24, 1962, and was appointed a County Court Judge. The Progressive Conservatives went on to a second majority victory that December under Roblin.

In February 1963 now Judge Thompson was appointed as a Commissioner to the Manitoba Royal Commission on Local Government Organization and Finance, at that point to be chaired by Roland Michener. After Michener was appointed High Commissioner to India in 1964, Thompson took up the Chair of the Royal Commission and issued their final report in August of that year.

Judge Thompson continued to serve the southern and eastern Manitoba judicial districts for more than twenty years, retiring from the bench in 1983. He died of cancer on December 15, 1986, in Winnipeg.

== Tributes ==
For his achievements Thompson is a member of the Brandon University Alumni Wall of Fame, and recognized as a 'Memorable Manitoban' by the Manitoba Historical Society.
