= Neil Cameron (Manitoba politician) =

Canadian politician (1863-1935)

Neil Cameron (September 1, 1863—May 22, 1935) was a politician in Manitoba, Canada. He served in the Legislative Assembly of Manitoba from 1922 to 1927, and was a cabinet minister in the government of John Bracken.

Cameron was born in Owen Sound, Canada West, the son of Alexander Cameron and Mary McLean, Scottish Presbyterians who arrived in Canada in 1840 and came to Manitoba in 1874. He was educated near Owen Sound and in Burnside, Manitoba, and was known as a skilled athlete in his younger years. Cameron worked as a farmer and rancher, was a prominent figure in Manitoba's cattle shipping trade, and founded the Neil Cameron Elevator Co. in Basswood, Manitoba. He served as reeve of Harrison for eighteen years. In 1889, Cameron married Mary Kippen.

He first ran for the Manitoba legislature in the 1903 provincial election, as a Liberal candidate in the constituency of Minnedosa. He lost to Conservative candidate William B. Waddell by eighty-one votes.

Cameron later joined the United Farmers of Manitoba (UFM), and ran under its banner in the 1922 provincial election. He was elected without difficulty. The UFM won a convincing victory across the province, and formed government as the Progressive Party of Manitoba. Cameron was appointed to John Bracken's cabinet on August 8, 1922, as Minister of Agriculture and Immigration, and as the cabinet representative of farming interests in the western part of the province. He was one of three cabinet ministers to oppose Bracken's initiative for a Manitoba Wheat Board, in a free vote held in early 1923.

Cameron resigned from the Agriculture portfolio for health reasons on December 3, 1923, though he remained in cabinet until June 28, 1927, as a minister without portfolio. He did not seek re-election in the 1927 campaign.

He attempted to return to the legislature in the 1932 election, but narrowly lost to Conservative candidate Earl Rutledge.

Cameron died in hospital in Winnipeg at the age of 71.
