= Peter Dyck =

Canadian politician (1946–2020)

Member of the Legislative Assembly of Manitoba for Pembina
- In office April 25, 1995 – October 11, 2011
- Preceded by: Donald Orchard
- Succeeded by: Riding dissolved

Personal details
- Born: Peter George Dyck; November 22, 1946 Winkler, Manitoba, Canada
- Died: January 5, 2020 (aged 73) Winkler, Manitoba, Canada
- Party: Progressive Conservative Party of Manitoba
- Occupation: teacher

Peter George Dyck (November 22, 1946 – January 5, 2020) was a politician in Manitoba, Canada. He was a member of the Manitoba legislature from 1995 to 2011.

Before entering provincial politics, Dyck was a public school music teacher (one of his students was Loreena McKennitt). He was also on the board of directors of the Winkler Credit Union for 17 years (as president for five), and was a member of the Garden Valley School Division board from 1978 to 1995 (as chair for ten). Dyck was also the owner and operator of a grain and special crops farm, with a cattle feedlot.

Dyck was first elected in the Manitoba legislature in the provincial election of 1995, running as a candidate of the governing Progressive Conservatives in the rural, southern riding of Pembina. This riding is known to be extremely safe for the Progressive Conservatives, and Dyck defeated his leading opponent, the Liberal Walter Hoeppner, by about 2,500 votes. He was not appointed to Gary Filmon's cabinet, but was a legislative assistant to the minister of education and training.

Dyck was easily re-elected in the 1999 election, despite the Progressive Conservatives being defeated by the New Democratic Party under Gary Doer. He was appointed caucus chair following the election.

Dyck received over 76% of his riding's popular vote in the 2003 election, despite the poor showing of the Progressive Conservative Party elsewhere in the province. He was returned again in the 2007 provincial election. He did not run for reelection in 2011. Dyck died in Winkler on January 5, 2020, at the age of 73 from complications of progressive supranuclear palsy.

The Peter Dyck fonds is held at Library and Archives Canada.
