= Robert Hill Myers =

Canadian politician

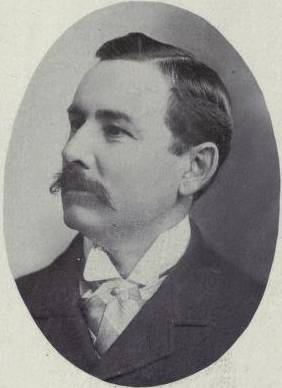

Member of the Legislative Assembly of Manitoba for Minnedosa
- In office 1892–1903

Personal details
- Born: March 30, 1856; Oxford County, Canada West
- Died: November 16, 1921 (aged 65); Winnipeg, Manitoba

Robert Hill Myers (March 30, 1856 – November 16, 1921) was a lawyer, judge and political figure in Manitoba. He represented Minnedosa from 1892 to 1903 in the Legislative Assembly of Manitoba as a Liberal.

He was born in Oxford County, Canada West, the son of Robert Myers, a native of England, and Margaret Hill, a native of Scotland. Myers was educated at the Collegiate Institute in Stratford and at Osgoode Hall. He was called to the Ontario bar in 1880, then moved to Manitoba in 1882 and was called to the Manitoba bar the following year. In 1885, Myers married Annie McLeod. He practised law briefly in Winnipeg and Brandon before settling in Minnedosa, where he was in practice for 21 years.

In January 1903, he was named county court judge for Winnipeg. Myers died in Winnipeg at the age of 65.

His former home in Minnedosa was designated a Manitoba Municipal Heritage site in 1986.
