= Earl Rutledge =

Canadian politician (1894-1974)

Earl James Rutledge (August 22, 1894 in Rutledge, Quebec – November 4, 1974) was a politician in Manitoba, Canada. He served in the Legislative Assembly of Manitoba from 1927 to 1948, initially as a Conservative and later as a Progressive Conservative after the party changed its name.

== Biography ==
The son of John Rutledge and Elizabeth Sullivan, Rutledge was educated at Queen's University in Kingston, Ontario, earning a medical degree. He worked as a physician and surgeon. In 1919, Rutledge married Gladys Williams.

He was first elected to the Manitoba legislature in the 1927 provincial election, defeating Progressive candidate N.W.P. Shuttleworth by fourteen votes in the constituency of Minnedosa. Shuttleworth actually won a plurality of votes over Rutledge on the first count, but lost the seat following transfers from the third-place candidate. (Manitoba elections were determined by preferential balloting during this period.)

Rutledge was returned again in the 1932 election, defeating Liberal-Progressive candidate Neil Cameron by the increased margin of sixteen votes. He won his first convincing victory in the 1936 provincial election, defeating Liberal-Progressive candidate Henry Rungay by almost 300 votes.

The Conservative Party joined the Liberal-Progressives in a coalition government in 1940, and Rutledge served as a backbench supporter of John Bracken's government. He again defeated Henry Rungay in the 1941 provincial election, again by an increased margin. In 1945, he defeated a candidate of the CCF.

He resigned his seat on July 13, 1948.
