= Henry Rungay =

Canadian politician (1888-1955)

Henry Smalley Rungay (October 14, 1888 in London, UK – November 23, 1955 in Brandon, MB) was a politician in Manitoba, Canada. He served in the Legislative Assembly of Manitoba as a Liberal-Progressive from 1948 to 1953.

Rungay was educated in London, and continued his studies at the University of Manitoba after moving to Canada in 1906. He became a pharmaceutical chemist after graduation, working as a druggist and clerk in the municipality of Harrison. He was chosen president of the local Red Cross Association in 1941, and served as vice-president of the Trans-Canada Highway Association. Rungay also served as secretary-treasurer for the Rural Municipality of Harrison and was a correspondent for the Western Municipal News.

Rungay first campaigned for the Manitoba legislature in the 1936 provincial election, but lost to Conservative candidate Earl J. Rutledge by 273 votes in Minnedosa. He lost to Rutledge again, by a greater margin, in the 1941 provincial election.

Rutledge resigned from the legislature in 1948, and Rungay was elected to take his place, defeating a candidate of the Cooperative Commonwealth Federation in a by-election held on July 13 of the same year. He was returned by acclamation in the 1949 provincial election. The Liberal-Progressives and Progressive Conservatives were cooperating in a coalition government during this period, and did not always challenge one another in constituency elections.

Rungay served as a government backbencher during his time in the legislature. He unexpectedly lost to Gilbert Hutton of the Manitoba Social Credit Party in the 1953 provincial election, by thirty-two votes.

He died at the age of 67.

His son, Henry Hunter Rungay, was also a public figure in Manitoba.
