= John Stevenson (Manitoba politician) =

Canadian politician

John Albert Stevenson (February 29, 1848 – August 6, 1879) was a farmer and political figure in Manitoba. He represented Pembina in 1879 in the Legislative Assembly of Manitoba until he died in office.

He was born in Scott Township, Canada West, the son of Robert Stevenson, a native of Ireland.
