= Manitoba Liberal Party candidates in the 1986 Manitoba provincial election =

The Manitoba Liberal Party fielded 57 candidates in the 1986 provincial election, one of whom was elected. Some of the party's candidates have their own biography pages; information about others may be found here.

== Gail Stapon (Concordia) ==
Stapon is a realtor, and was listed as president of the North End Housing Project in 2002. She has stood for the Manitoba Liberal Party on two occasions.

Electoral record
Election	Division	Party	Votes	%	Place	Winner
1981 provincial	Concordia	Liberal	309	3.53	3/5	Peter Fox, New Democratic Party
1986 provincial	Concordia	Liberal	909	10.92	3/4	Gary Doer, New Democratic Party

== Gilbert Benoit (Elmwood) ==
Benoit received 389 votes (5.50%), finishing third against New Democratic Party candidate Jim Maloway.

In 1995, a Gilbert Benoit was listed as co-owner of Ronin Records in Winnipeg. There is also a Gilbert Benoit employed with Ceridian Canada Ltd. as of 2007. It is possible that these are the same person.
