= George Henderson (Manitoba politician) =

Canadian politician

Member of the Legislative Assembly of Manitoba for Pembina
- In office June 25, 1969 – October 11, 1977
- Preceded by: Carolyne Morrison
- Succeeded by: Donald Orchard

Personal details
- Born: March 18, 1916 Homewood, Manitoba, Canada
- Died: June 4, 2008 (aged 92) Manitou, Manitoba, Canada
- Party: Progressive Conservative Party of Manitoba
- Occupation: real estate agent

George Lindsay Henderson (March 18, 1916 – June 4, 2008) was a politician in Manitoba, Canada. He was a Progressive Conservative member of the Legislative Assembly of Manitoba from 1969 to 1977.

Henderson was educated in the Manitoba school system, and worked as a farmer and real-estate agent. He also served as Mayor of Manitou, Manitoba, and was a President of Manitoba Co-operative.

He was first elected to the Manitoba legislature in the 1969 election, defeating Liberal Kenneth Draper by 1008 votes in the rural, southern riding of Pembina. He was re-elected by a much greater margin in the 1973 election, as Liberal support declined in rural areas. The NDP were in government during this period, and Henderson was an opposition MLA throughout his time in the legislature. He did not seek re-election in 1977.
