= 1986 Manitoba general election =

← 1981	March 18, 1986	1988 →

57 seats of the Legislative Assembly of Manitoba 29 seats were needed for a majority
	First party	Second party	Third party
Leader	Howard Pawley	Gary Filmon	Sharon Carstairs
Party	New Democratic	Progressive Conservative	Liberal
Leader since	November 4, 1979	December 10, 1983	March 4, 1984
Leader's seat	Selkirk	Tuxedo	River Heights
Last election	34	23	0
Seats won	30	26	1
Seat change	▼4	▲3	▲1
Popular vote	198,261	193,728	66,469
Percentage	41.50%	40.56%	13.92%
Swing	▼5.88pp	▼3.26pp	▲7.22pp
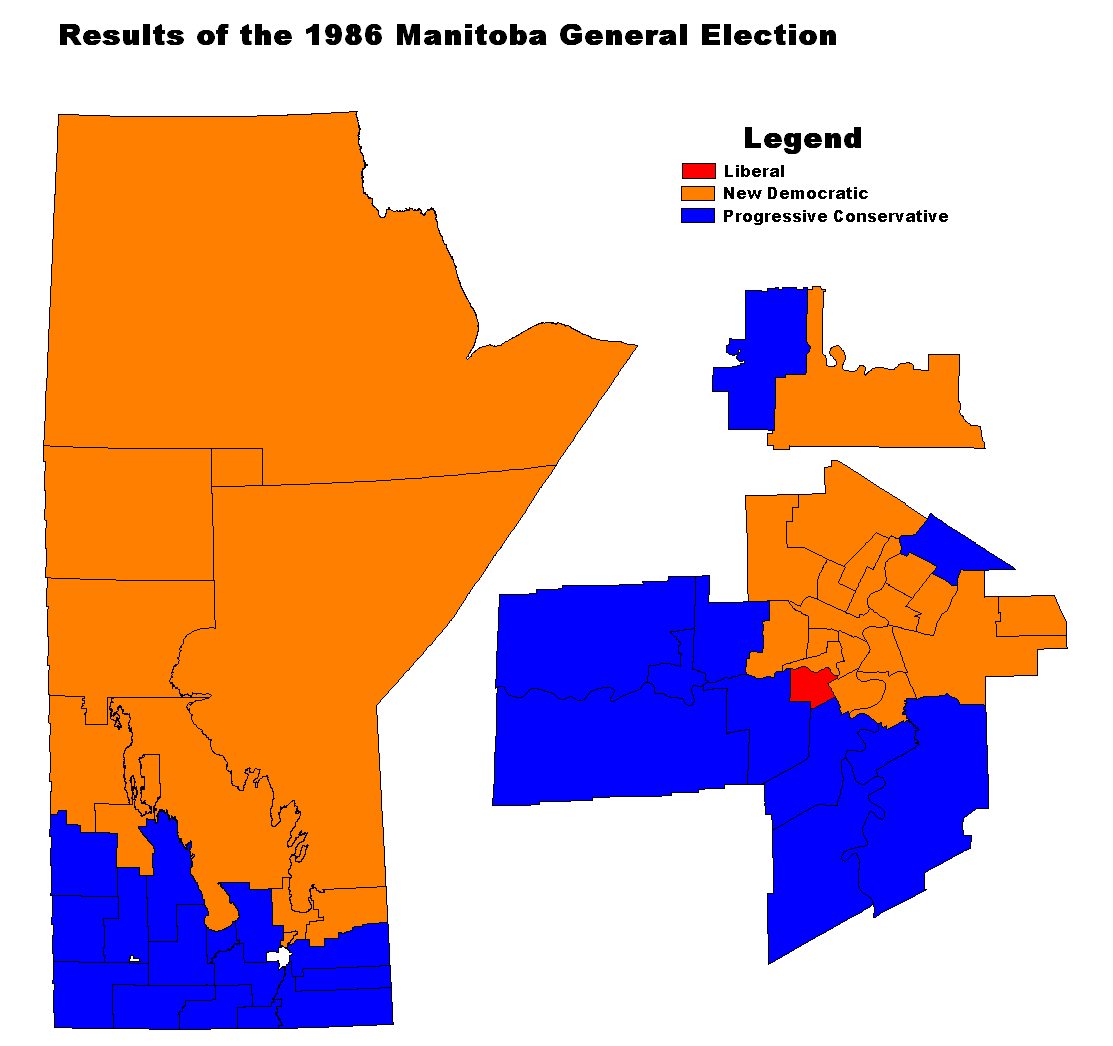
- Map of Election Results
Premier before election
Howard Pawley
New Democratic
Premier after election
Howard Pawley
New Democratic

The 1986 Manitoba general election was held on March 18, 1986 to elect Members of the Legislative Assembly of the Province of Manitoba, Canada. It was won by the New Democratic Party, which took 30 seats out of 57. The Progressive Conservative Party won 26 seats and formed the official opposition. The Manitoba Liberal Party, which had not been represented in the previous legislature, won one seat.

== Opinion polls ==
Evolution of voting intentions at provincial level
Polling firm	Last day of survey	Source	NDP	PC	MLP	Other	ME	Sample
Election 1986	March 18, 1986		41.50	40.56	13.92	2.96		
Institute of Social and Economic Research	February 1986		44.5	39.5	14.1	—	—	683
Institute of Social and Economic Research	April 1984		26.5	59.5	14	—	—	—
Election 1981	November 17, 1981		47.38	43.82	6.70	2.10		

== Results ==
Party	Party Leader	# of candidates	Seats			Popular Vote		
Party	Party Leader	# of candidates	Before^{1}	Elected	% Change	#	%	Change
New Democratic	Howard Pawley	57	32	30	-6.3%	198,261	41.50%	-5.88
Progressive Conservative	Gary Filmon	57	22	26	+18.2%	193,728	40.56%	-3.26
Liberal	Sharon Carstairs	57	-	1		66,469	13.92%	+7.22
Confederation of Regions	Dennis Heeney	14	-	-	-	11,677	2.44%	+2.44
Progressive	Sidney Green	12	-	-	-	2,451	0.51%	-1.30
Western Canada Concept	Fred Cameron	5	-	-	-	672	0.14%	+0.14
Communist	Paula Fletcher	5	-	-	-	356	0.08%	+0.03
Independent		9	2	-	-100%	4,076	0.85%	+0.61
Libertarian	Clancy Smith	(4)	-	-	-			
Total		216	57	57	-	477,690	100%	

^{1} "Before" refers to standings in the Legislature at dissolution, and not to the results of the previous election. These numbers therefore reflect changes in party standings as a result of by-elections and members crossing the floor.

=== Vote and seat summaries ===
Ternary plots – shift of electoral support (1981–1986)
1981

1986
Electoral districts identified by colours of winning parties

Popular vote
New Democratic	41.50%
PC	40.56%
Liberal	13.92%
Others	4.02%

Seats summary
New Democratic	52.63%
PC	45.61%
Liberal	1.75%

=== Synopsis of results ===
1986 Manitoba general election – synopsis of riding results
Electoral division	Winning party							Votes (Note: All parties with more than 1% of the vote are shown individually. Independent candidates and other minor parties are aggregated separately.)						
Electoral division	1981	1st place	Votes	Share	Margin #	Margin %	2nd place	NDP	PC	Lib	CoR	Ind	Oth	Total
Arthur	PC	PC	4,569	61.11%	3,371	45.08%	CoR	1,009	4,569	701	1,198	–	–	7,477
Assiniboia	PC	PC	3,813	51.62%	1,618	21.90%	NDP	2,195	3,813	1,379	–	–	–	7,387
Brandon East	NDP	NDP	4,173	52.88%	989	12.53%	PC	4,173	3,184	535	–	–	–	7,892
Brandon West	NDP	PC	5,537	53.11%	1,409	13.52%	NDP	4,128	5,537	760	–	–	–	10,425
Burrows	NDP	NDP	3,547	53.04%	2,110	31.55%	Ind	3,547	950	587	–	1,473 (Note: William Chornopyski, long-time city councillor in Winnipeg and active NDP supporter, left the NDP and stood as an Independent, winning 1,437 votes and finishing in second place.)	131	6,688
Charleswood	PC	PC	6,524	56.43%	3,698	31.99%	NDP	2,826	6,524	2,211	–	–	–	11,561
Churchill	NDP	NDP	2,940	73.50%	2,083	52.08%	PC	2,940	857	203	–	–	–	4,000
Concordia	NDP	NDP	4,525	54.37%	1,841	22.12%	PC	4,525	2,684	909	–	–	204	8,322
Dauphin	NDP	NDP	4,886	52.27%	1,765	18.88%	PC	4,886	3,121	1,341	–	–	–	9,348
Ellice	NDP	NDP	3,989	57.67%	2,258	32.64%	PC	3,989	1,731	929	–	–	268	6,917
Elmwood	NDP	NDP	3,241	45.84%	1,235	17.47%	Ind	3,241	1,435	389	–	2,006 (Note: Russell Doern, NDP Cabinet minister under Edward Schreyer and Howard Pawley, left the NDP in 1984.)	–	7,071
Emerson	PC	PC	4,758	51.75%	978	10.64%	NDP	3,780	4,758	656	–	–	–	9,194
Flin Flon	NDP	NDP	3,316	69.49%	2,244	47.02%	PC	3,316	1,072	384	–	–	–	4,772
Fort Garry	PC	PC	5,146	48.45%	1,988	18.72%	NDP	3,158	5,146	2,114	–	–	204	10,622
Fort Rouge	NDP	NDP	4,223	48.86%	1,633	18.89%	PC	4,223	2,590	1,683	–	101	46	8,643
Gimli	NDP	NDP	4,906	50.83%	951	9.85%	PC	4,906	3,955	649	–	–	141	9,651
Gladstone	PC	PC	3,402	49.25%	1,648	23.86%	CoR	872	3,402	879	1,754	–	–	6,907
Inkster	NDP	NDP	5,480	64.09%	3,754	43.91%	PC	5,480	1,726	938	–	101	305	8,550
Interlake	NDP	NDP	4,634	61.30%	2,453	32.45%	PC	4,634	2,181	455	289	–	–	7,559
Kildonan	NDP	NDP	6,199	51.65%	1,989	16.57%	PC	6,199	4,210	1,134	–	–	459	12,002
Kirkfield Park	PC	PC	5,497	57.14%	3,306	34.37%	NDP	2,191	5,497	1,932	–	–	–	9,620
La Vérendrye	PC	PC	3,618	59.12%	1,850	30.23%	NDP	1,768	3,618	734	–	–	–	6,120
Lac du Bonnet	NDP	NDP	3,903	46.12%	302	3.57%	PC	3,903	3,601	959	–	–	–	8,463
Lakeside	PC	PC	4,303	49.38%	1,903	21.84%	NDP	2,400	4,303	959	1,052	–	–	8,714
Logan	NDP	NDP	3,765	73.08%	2,974	57.73%	PC	3,765	791	502	–	94	–	5,152
Minnedosa	PC	PC	3,316	41.77%	947	11.93%	NDP	2,369	3,316	745	1,508	–	–	7,938
Morris	PC	PC	4,378	68.78%	3,238	50.87%	NDP	1,140	4,378	847	–	–	–	6,365
Niakwa	PC	PC	6,437	47.44%	1,606	11.84%	NDP	4,831	6,437	2,300	–	–	–	13,568
Osborne	NDP	NDP	4,747	55.38%	2,399	27.99%	PC	4,747	2,348	1,259	–	–	217	8,571
Pembina	PC	PC	5,270	65.19%	4,326	53.51%	CoR	913	5,270	849	944	–	108	8,084
Portage la Prairie	PC	PC	3,693	51.35%	2,236	31.09%	NDP	1,457	3,693	968	1,074	–	–	7,192
Radisson	NDP	NDP	4,810	53.71%	2,144	23.94%	PC	4,810	2,666	1,239	–	–	240	8,955
Rhineland	PC	PC	3,037	51.34%	1,488	25.16%	NDP	1,549	3,037	1,329	–	–	–	5,915
Riel	NDP	PC	4,479	47.10%	769	8.09%	NDP	3,710	4,479	1,133	187	–	–	9,509
River East	NDP	PC	6,598	48.88%	750	5.56%	NDP	5,848	6,598	696	280	–	76	13,498
River Heights	PC	Liberal	4,620	44.98%	1,485	14.46%	PC	2,516	3,135	4,620	–	–	–	10,271
Roblin-Russell	PC	PC	3,241	38.09%	38	0.45%	NDP	3,203	3,241	2,065	–	–	–	8,509
Rossmere	NDP	NDP	4,613	47.04%	527	5.37%	PC	4,613	4,086	1,108	–	–	–	9,807
Rupertsland	NDP	NDP	2,302	60.42%	1,371	35.98%	PC	2,302	931	577	–	–	–	3,810
Selkirk	NDP	NDP	5,135	54.93%	2,016	21.56%	PC	5,135	3,119	1,023	–	–	72	9,349
Seven Oaks	NDP	NDP	5,158	64.71%	3,317	41.61%	PC	5,158	1,841	907	–	–	65	7,971
Springfield	NDP	PC	5,094	44.26%	55	0.48%	NDP	5,039	5,094	1,376	–	–	–	11,509
St. Boniface	NDP	NDP	4,978	60.77%	3,027	36.95%	Lib	4,978	1,114	1,951	–	–	149	8,192
St. James	NDP	NDP	4,120	44.22%	155	1.66%	PC	4,120	3,965	922	175	–	136	9,318
St. Johns	NDP	NDP	3,753	56.39%	1,804	27.10%	PC	3,753	1,949	632	–	115	207	6,656
St. Norbert	PC	PC	5,788	50.72%	2,949	25.84%	NDP	2,839	5,788	2,784	–	–	–	11,411
St. Vital	NDP	NDP	4,430	45.32%	558	5.71%	PC	4,430	3,872	1,472	–	–	–	9,774
Ste. Rose	NDP	PC	3,735	45.77%	715	8.76%	NDP	3,020	3,735	952	454	–	–	8,161
Sturgeon Creek	PC	PC	4,994	55.17%	2,592	28.63%	NDP	2,402	4,994	1,530	–	126	–	9,052
Swan River	PC	NDP	3,773	47.88%	65	0.82%	PC	3,773	3,708	399	–	–	–	7,880
The Pas	NDP	NDP	4,051	68.34%	2,963	49.98%	PC	4,051	1,088	789	–	–	–	5,928
Thompson	NDP	NDP	3,852	66.61%	2,354	40.71%	PC	3,852	1,498	433	–	–	–	5,783
Transcona	NDP	NDP	4,631	59.39%	2,665	34.18%	PC	4,631	1,966	1,200	–	–	–	7,797
Turtle Mountain	PC	PC	3,390	47.51%	2,037	28.55%	NDP	1,353	3,390	1,242	1,150	–	–	7,135
Tuxedo	PC	PC	5,268	49.09%	1,724	16.06%	Lib	1,816	5,268	3,544	–	–	104	10,732
Virden	PC	PC	4,251	52.99%	2,501	31.18%	NDP	1,750	4,251	524	1,497	–	–	8,022
Wolseley	NDP	NDP	4,099	51.42%	1,881	23.60%	PC	4,099	2,218	1,132	115	60	347	7,971

= open seat
= winning candidate was in previous Legislature
= incumbent had switched allegiance
= not incumbent; was previously elected to the Legislature
= other incumbents renominated
= Libertarian candidate - party not recognized by Elections Manitoba
= multiple candidates

=== Turnout, winning shares and swings ===
Summary of riding results by turnout, vote share for winning candidate, and swing (vs 1981)
Riding and winning party			Turnout		Vote share (Note: Share won by winning candidate, with difference noted from share achieved by the same party in 1981.)		Swing (Note: Positive indicates improvement to standing of party winning in 1981; negative points to 1981's second-place party being swung to.)	
Riding and winning party			%	Change (pp)	%	Change (pp)	To	Change (pp)
Arthur	PC	Hold	67.11	1.84	61.11	-14.42	NDP	-1.72
Assiniboia	PC	Hold	64.04	-7.29	51.62	1.69	PC	3.57
Brandon East	NDP	Hold	67.02	-3.42	52.88	-8.28	PC	-8.06
Brandon West	PC	Gain	70.92	-7.84	53.11	7.90	PC	-8.88
Burrows	NDP	Hold	61.59	-6.03	53.04	-9.96	PC	-3.17
Charleswood	PC	Hold	69.52	-5.13	56.43	-2.34	PC	1.65
Churchill	NDP	Hold	61.05	-0.06	73.50	8.95	NDP	6.45
Concordia	NDP	Hold	66.22	-3.44	54.37	-6.54	PC	-4.63
Dauphin	NDP	Hold	78.70	-5.51	52.27	4.38	NDP	6.19
Ellice	NDP	Hold	66.37	-3.89	57.67	-2.76	PC	-1.67
Elmwood	NDP	Hold	64.33	-1.84	45.84	-21.99	PC	-8.54
Emerson	PC	Hold	72.99	-1.64	51.75	2.14	PC	3.30
Flin Flon	NDP	Hold	56.38	-9.32	69.49	6.90	NDP	10.92
Fort Garry	PC	Hold	66.23	-6.68	48.45	-7.27	NDP	-1.92
Fort Rouge	NDP	Hold	64.33	-7.50	48.86	4.30	NDP	1.75
Gimli	NDP	Hold	75.17	-2.57	50.83	-1.48	NDP	0.43
Gladstone	PC	Hold	62.62	-3.08	49.25	-15.82	NDP	-2.15
Inkster	NDP	Hold	60.25	-9.52	64.09	-5.79	PC	-4.31
Interlake	NDP	Hold	66.08	-1.81	61.30	-3.00	PC	-0.68
Kildonan	NDP	Hold	63.47	-13.20	51.65	-3.47	PC	-1.11
Kirkfield Park	PC	Hold	68.62	-7.39	57.14	-7.33	PC	2.71
La Vérendrye	PC	Hold	50.42	-7.84	59.12	-11.33	NDP	-10.95
Lac du Bonnet	NDP	Hold	73.94	3.61	46.12	-16.38	PC	-10.72
Lakeside	PC	Hold	71.05	-2.49	49.38	-10.91	NDP	-3.54
Logan	NDP	Hold	56.00	-5.72	73.08	1.08	N/A (Note: Stephen Juba, previously an MLA before moving to municipal politics and becoming Mayor of Winnipeg, had campaigned as an Independent in 1981, finishing second. He decided not to campaign again in 1986.)	
Minnedosa	PC	Hold	69.35	2.03	41.77	-13.27	PC	0.92
Morris	PC	Hold	59.73	-5.09	68.78	-2.76	PC	3.89
Niakwa	PC	Hold	71.57	-4.38	47.44	0.26	PC	2.90
Osborne	NDP	Hold	69.15	-6.71	55.38	-1.01	NDP	0.11
Pembina	PC	Hold	63.89	-3.27	65.19	-12.45	NDP	-6.61
Portage la Prairie	PC	Hold	65.03	-6.80	51.35	3.93	PC	7.64
Radisson	NDP	Hold	69.55	-6.62	53.71	-13.78	PC	-7.60
Rhineland	PC	Hold	50.50	-0.33	51.34	-21.56	NDP	-13.41
Riel	PC	Gain	74.24	-4.36	47.10	4.48	PC	-5.30
River East	PC	Gain	73.45	-3.92	48.88	0.84	PC	-2.97
River Heights	Lib	Gain	80.66	-3.11	44.98	21.57	NDP	-4.81
Roblin-Russell	PC	Hold	78.60	3.35	38.09	-17.01	NDP	-4.88
Rossmere	NDP	Hold	77.91	-4.23	47.04	-7.45	PC	-4.31
Rupertsland	NDP	Hold	41.96	-11.72	60.42	-9.06	Lib	-0.60
Selkirk	NDP	Hold	74.93	-0.10	54.93	-9.17	PC	-4.06
Seven Oaks	NDP	Hold	63.36	-8.74	64.71	-2.19	PC	-0.75
Springfield	PC	Gain	73.33	-3.03	44.26	-1.44	PC	-2.46
St. Boniface	NDP	Hold	69.73	-6.93	60.77	-2.61	Lib	-2.78
St. James	NDP	Hold	72.49	-4.98	44.22	-8.73	PC	-3.00
St. Johns	NDP	Hold	62.42	-4.76	56.39	-0.60	PC	-2.24
St. Norbert	PC	Hold	68.88	-5.01	50.72	-3.18	PC	3.97
St. Vital	NDP	Hold	73.81	-6.80	45.32	-7.48	PC	-3.23
Ste. Rose	PC	Gain	72.65	-0.48	45.77	-1.74	PC	-5.67
Sturgeon Creek	PC	Hold	67.45	-5.62	55.17	-3.02	PC	2.29
Swan River	NDP	Gain	80.18	2.70	47.88	0.55	NDP	-2.17
The Pas	NDP	Hold	68.18	-5.71	68.34	-1.70	NDP	0.74
Thompson	NDP	Hold	71.50	-9.14	66.61	17.17	NDP	19.74
Transcona	NDP	Hold	65.56	-6.43	59.39	-12.17	PC	-5.19
Turtle Mountain	PC	Hold	69.23	6.27	47.51	-24.85	NDP	-9.33
Tuxedo	PC	Hold	71.84	-2.29	49.09	-15.50	NDP	-4.54
Virden	PC	Hold	67.85	-1.12	52.99	-10.90	PC	1.70
Wolseley	NDP	Hold	65.95	-12.01	51.42	3.07	NDP	3.69

=== Changes in party shares ===
Share change analysis by party and riding (1986 vs 1981)
Riding	Liberal		NDP		PC	
Riding	%	Change (pp)	%	Change (pp)	%	Change (pp)
Arthur	9.38	9.38	13.49	-10.98	61.11	-14.42
Assiniboia	18.67	8.48	29.71	-5.46	51.62	1.69
Brandon East	6.78	0.44	52.88	-8.28	40.34	7.84
Brandon West	7.29	1.95	39.60	-9.86	53.11	7.90
Burrows	8.78	0.83	53.04	-9.96	14.20	-3.62
Charleswood	19.12	10.13	24.44	-5.65	56.43	-2.34
Churchill	5.08	-2.57	73.50	8.95	21.43	-3.94
Concordia	10.92	7.39	54.37	-6.54	32.25	2.71
Dauphin	14.35	3.61	52.27	4.38	33.39	-7.99
Ellice	13.43	2.27	57.67	-2.76	25.03	0.59
Elmwood	5.50	0.92	45.84	-21.99	20.29	-4.91
Emerson	7.14	3.64	41.11	-4.46	51.75	2.14
Flin Flon	8.05	8.05	69.49	6.90	22.46	-14.95
Fort Garry	19.90	10.58	29.73	-3.42	48.45	-7.27
Fort Rouge	19.47	-5.31	48.86	4.30	29.97	0.79
Gimli	6.72	3.73	50.83	-1.48	40.98	-2.34
Gladstone	12.73	1.94	12.62	-11.52	49.25	-15.82
Inkster	10.97	6.92	64.09	-5.79	20.19	2.83
Interlake	6.02	0.82	61.30	-3.00	28.85	-1.64
Kildonan	9.45	3.32	51.65	-3.47	35.08	-1.25
Kirkfield Park	20.08	20.08	22.78	-12.76	57.14	-7.33
La Vérendrye	11.99	11.99	28.89	10.57	59.12	-11.33
Lac du Bonnet	11.33	11.33	46.12	-16.38	42.55	5.05
Lakeside	11.01	3.94	27.54	-3.83	49.38	-10.91
Logan	9.74	9.74	73.08	1.08	15.35	2.73
Minnedosa	9.39	9.39	29.84	-15.11	41.77	-13.27
Morris	13.31	13.31	17.91	-10.54	68.78	-2.76
Niakwa	16.95	5.27	35.61	-5.53	47.44	0.26
Osborne	14.69	1.44	55.38	-1.01	27.39	-1.23
Pembina	10.50	2.01	11.29	0.77	65.19	-12.45
Portage la Prairie	13.46	-7.51	20.26	-11.35	51.35	3.93
Radisson	13.84	13.84	53.71	-13.78	29.77	1.42
Rhineland	22.47	22.47	26.19	5.27	51.34	-21.56
Riel	11.92	0.67	39.02	-6.11	47.10	4.48
River East	5.16	3.05	43.32	-5.09	48.88	0.84
River Heights	44.98	21.57	24.50	-5.32	30.52	-14.94
Roblin-Russell	24.27	24.27	37.64	-7.25	38.09	-17.01
Rossmere	11.30	7.63	47.04	-7.45	41.66	1.16
Rupertsland	15.14	-7.86	60.42	-9.06	24.44	18.20
Selkirk	10.94	10.94	54.93	-9.17	33.36	-1.05
Seven Oaks	11.38	6.07	64.71	-2.19	23.10	-0.69
Springfield	11.96	8.86	43.78	-6.36	44.26	-1.44
St. Boniface	23.82	2.94	60.77	-2.61	13.60	-1.00
St. James	9.89	9.89	44.22	-8.73	42.55	-2.73
St. Johns	9.50	-0.10	56.39	-0.60	29.28	3.88
St. Norbert	24.40	16.33	24.88	-11.12	50.72	-3.18
St. Vital	15.06	8.50	45.32	-7.48	39.62	-1.02
Ste. Rose	11.67	11.67	37.01	-13.08	45.77	-1.74
Sturgeon Creek	16.90	9.22	26.54	-7.60	55.17	-3.02
Swan River	5.06	5.06	47.88	0.55	47.06	-3.80
The Pas	13.31	4.89	68.34	-1.70	18.35	-3.19
Thompson	7.49	5.13	66.61	17.17	25.90	-22.30
Transcona	15.39	15.39	59.39	-12.17	25.21	-1.79
Turtle Mountain	17.41	17.41	18.96	-6.19	47.51	-24.85
Tuxedo	33.02	20.96	16.92	-6.43	49.09	-15.50
Virden	6.53	6.53	21.82	-14.29	52.99	-10.90
Wolseley	14.20	-2.83	51.42	3.07	27.83	-4.31

= did not field a candidate in 1981

== Post-election changes ==
Early in 1988, Laurent Desjardins (St. Boniface) announced his retirement from the legislature. Soon after this, NDP backbencher Jim Walding (St. Vital) voted against his party's budget, causing the government to fall.

== See also ==
- List of Manitoba political parties
- Manitoba Liberal Party candidates, 1986 Manitoba provincial election

Preceded by 1981 Manitoba election	List of Manitoba elections	Succeeded by 1988 Manitoba election
