= Ken Draper =

Canadian football player

Profile
- Position: Halfback

Personal information
- Born: October 7, 1918
- Died: September 10, 1983 (aged 64)

Career information
- University: Manitoba

Career history
- 1940–1941: Winnipeg Blue Bombers
- 1945–1946: Winnipeg Blue Bombers

Awards and highlights
- Grey Cup champion (1941)

Kenneth John Draper (October 7, 1918 – September 10, 1983) was a Canadian professional football player who played for the Winnipeg Blue Bombers. He won the Grey Cup with them in 1941.

Draper and his family originated from Winnipeg. He had a sister, Thelma, and a brother, Walter, who died suddenly in November 1940, at the age of 25. In October 1956, it was reported that Draper was living in Carman, Manitoba and working as a farmer, though also actively coached high school football. In 1974, Draper served as secretary-treasurer of the Western Canada Fairs Association (WCFA), and in 1978 served as one of its vice presidents.

Draper was married to Irene Margaret Wilton (1922–1999). He died on September 10, 1983, at the age of 64.
