= Charles Shuttleworth =

Canadian politician (1910-2006)

Charles Lemington Shuttleworth (September 28, 1910 in Minnedosa, Manitoba – April 13, 2006 in Minnedosa, Manitoba) was a politician in Manitoba, Canada. He served in the Legislative Assembly of Manitoba as a Liberal-Progressive from 1949 to 1959, and was a cabinet minister in the government of Douglas Campbell. His father, N.W.P. Shuttleworth, unsuccessfully ran for the Manitoba legislature in the 1927 election as a Progressive.

Shuttleworth worked as a farmer before entering political life. He served as reeve of the Rural Municipality of Odanah, and was president of the Manitoba Approved Flock Owners. He was a member of the United Farmers of Manitoba.

He was first elected to the Manitoba legislature in the 1949 provincial election, defeating Progressive Conservative E.P. Venables by 241 votes in the rural constituency of Hamiota. He defeated Venables again in the 1953 election, and was appointed to cabinet on September 4, 1953 as Minister of Public Utilities and Power Commissioner. On July 6, 1956, he was also appointed Minister of Agriculture. He was responsible for overseeing the Rural Electrification Program.

The Liberal-Progressives lost power after the 1958 election, although Shuttleworth was re-elected in the redistributed constituency of Minnedosa. In the 1959 election, he lost the seat to future Premier Walter Weir by 357 votes.

Shuttleworth campaigned for the House of Commons of Canada as a Liberal in the federal election of 1962. Running in Portage—Neepawa, he lost to Progressive Conservative Siegfried Enns by 3,510 votes.

He was appointed to the Board of Grain Commissioners in 1965, and became the first chairman of the Board of the Canadian International Grain Institute in 1972. He retired in 1977.

In 1981, Shuttleworth received a certificate of merit from the Manitoba Agricultural and Food Science Grads Association. He was named to the Manitoba Agricultural Hall of Fame in 1996.

Shuttleworth was married to Charlotte May Sedgwick from 1935 until her death in 1981. He married Mae Johnson in 1995.

Shuttleworth's daughter, Elaine Shuttleworth, once ran for the Manitoba legislature as a candidate of the Manitoba Liberal Party.

He suffered a stroke in 2000 and died at a long term care home in Minnedosa six years later at the age of 95.
