= Manitoba Reform Party =

The Manitoba Reform Party was a right-wing political party in Manitoba, Canada in the early 1990s. It was known as the Manitoba Confederation of Regions Party (CoR) in the provincial elections of 1986, 1988 and 1990.

== Confederation of Regions ==
The Manitoba Confederation of Regions Party was the provincial branch of the Confederation of Regions Party of Canada, a right-wing organization which sought greater autonomy for Western Canada. Unlike the Western Canada Concept and the Western Independence Party, the CoR did not advocate full independence for the western provinces. The national party leader was Elmer Knutson; its original provincial leader was Douglas Edmondson.

The Manitoba CoR was founded in 1984, as a result of public controversy over New Democratic Party Premier Howard Pawley's attempts to entrench francophone services in the province. The CoR opposed any expansion of French language rights.

The national CoR Party polled surprisingly well in the 1984 federal election in Manitoba, placing second to the Progressive Conservatives in three rural anglophone ridings. The party, as such, hoped to elect candidates to the Legislative Assembly of Manitoba in the general election of 1986.

The party ran 15 candidates in 1986, and managed to place second in four rural ridings (Arthur, Gladstone, Pembina and Rhineland). None of the CoR's candidates came close to victory; Dennis Heeney, who had replaced Edmondson as leader, placed third in Minnedosa.

The CoR ran 14 candidates in 1988. Despite a high-profile endorsement of the party from former Premier Douglas Campbell, no candidate placed higher than a distant third. Dennis Heeney appears to have stepped down as party leader following the election.

In 1990, only five candidates ran under the CoR banner. Irene Armishaw was the party's president. Armishaw received the largest number of votes of any of the party's candidates—486 votes in the rural riding of Lakeside.

== Reform Party ==
In April 1991, the Manitoba CoR changed its name to the Manitoba Reform Party after a mail-in referendum among party members conducted in March and April, in which 67% of the respondents were said to have favoured the change. (The Manitoba CoR had 65-70 members by this time.)

The new name brought about a lawsuit from the Reform Party of Canada, which had no formal connection to the Manitoba group. National CoR leader Elmer Knutson was also opposed to the change. Manitoba Reformers argued that as no other group had applied to use the name on a provincial level. The Court of Appeals in Manitoba determined in 1991 that party's use of the word "Reform" at the provincial level was legal.

In February 1992, the Manitoba Reform Party ejected four "rebels" who had accused the national leadership of having lost touch with the grassroots membership. About 78 percent of members who voted, voted to remove the four Reformers, who were from St James, Winnipeg South, and St Boniface.

In September 1992, the Manitoba Reform Party contested two provincial by-elections. Ken Carver received 97 votes in Crescentwood, and anti-bilingualism activist Fred Debrecen received 388 votes in Portage la Prairie.

The party was registered with Elections Manitoba for the 1995 provincial election, but did not run any candidates. Its subsequent history is unclear.

In 1997, the Manitoba Reform Party championed tax cuts during the federal election campaign, arguing that its plan, which included benefits for low-income families, was superior to the 10% across-the-board tax cut proposed by the Tories.

== See also ==
- Canadian political parties
