= James Gillies (Manitoba politician) =

Canadian politician (1856–1930)

James Daniel Gillies (December 10, 1856 – January 20, 1930) was a merchant and political figure in Manitoba. He represented Minnedosa East from 1886 to 1888 and Minnedosa from 1888 to 1892 in the Legislative Assembly of Manitoba as a Conservative.

He was born in Charlottetown, Prince Edward Island, the son of Angus Gillies, and educated in Summerside. Gillies came to Manitoba in 1876, establishing himself as a merchant in Minnedosa in 1878. In 1881, he married Jean, the daughter of Kenneth McKenzie. Gillies was chairman of the Board of School Trustees from 1883 to 1884, also serving as mayor and as warden of Minnedosa County in 1885.

In 1901, he was serving as an agent of the Manitoba government in Saint Paul, Minnesota. Gillies died in Victoria, British Columbia on January 20, 1930.
