= Walter Weir =

Premier of Manitoba from 1967 to 1969

Walter C. Weir
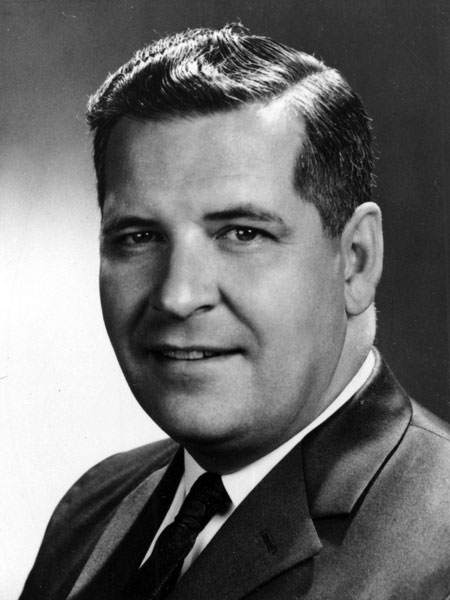
- Weir, c. 1969

15th Premier of Manitoba
- In office November 27, 1967 – July 15, 1969
- Monarch: Elizabeth II
- Lieutenant Governor: Richard S. Bowles
- Preceded by: Dufferin Roblin
- Succeeded by: Edward Schreyer

Member of the Legislative Assembly of Manitoba for Minnedosa
- In office May 14, 1959 – September 1, 1971
- Preceded by: Charles Shuttleworth
- Succeeded by: Dave Blake

Personal details
- Born: Walter Cocksmith Weir; June 7, 1929 High Bluff, Manitoba, Canada
- Died: April 17, 1985 (aged 55) Minnedosa, Manitoba, Canada
- Party: Progressive Conservative
- Spouse: Harriet Thompson (m. 1951)
- Children: Leslie Enid, John Dixon, James Patrick and Hugh Cameron
- Education: Portage Collegiate Institute
- Occupation: funeral director
- Profession: politician
- Cabinet: Minister of Municipal Affairs (1961-1963); Minister of Public Works (1962-1967); Minister of Highways (1967)

Walter Cox-Smith Weir (June 7, 1929 – April 17, 1985) was a Canadian politician. Weir served as the 15th premier of Manitoba from 1967 to 1969.

== Personal life ==
The son of James Dixon Weir, Walter Weir was born in High Bluff, Manitoba and was educated there and in the City of Portage la Prairie. Weir worked as an undertaker in Saskatchewan, later returning to Manitoba where he became the owner of his own funeral home in Minnedosa in 1953. In 1951, he married Harriet Thompson.

Weir served as chairman of the Minnedosa Hospital Board from 1955 to 1957, and of the Minnedosa Town Council from 1958 to 1959.

Weir died in the evening of April 17, 1985 of a suspected heart attack at his home in Minnedosa, Manitoba.

== Political career ==
He sought the Progressive Conservative nomination for the rural riding of Minnedosa in the buildup to the 1958 provincial election, but lost to Sid Paler. He later defeated Paler for the party's nomination in the buildup to the 1959 provincial election; there was no lasting animosity between the candidates, and Paler served as Weir's campaign manager in the election that followed.

Weir was first elected to the Manitoba legislature in Dufferin Roblin's landslide victory of 1959, defeating Liberal-Progressive incumbent Charles Shuttleworth in Minnedosa. He was appointed Minister of Municipal Affairs on October 25, 1961, holding the portfolio until February 27, 1963. Weir was also Minister of Public Works from November 5, 1962 to July 22, 1967 and Minister of Highways from July 1, 1967 to November 27, 1967. He was re-elected without difficulty in 1962, and again by a credible margin in the provincial election of 1966.

When Roblin moved to federal politics in 1967, Weir defeated Sterling Lyon and two other candidates to become the party's new leader. He was sworn in as Premier on November 27, 1967.

Weir represented a "rural populist" wing within the Manitoba Tories, and spoke for the party's more conservative members who had been marginalized during Red Tory Roblin's time as leader. Weir's government kept spending increases to a minimum and introduced a balanced budget without tax increases in 1968. Weir was skeptical toward the concept of Medicare, and his government did not sign on to the program until 1969, one year after its introduction. He also opposed the introduction of official bilingualism and attained national notoriety for his conflict with Canadian prime minister Pierre Trudeau over that issue.

Weir also proposed reforms for the Senate of Canada. He called for all provinces to have an equal number of senators and for some Senate representatives to be appointed on the recommendation of provincial governments. He also recommended for the Senate to be given more powers, including the authority to ratify international treaties.

Weir called four by-elections in early 1969, largely to test his government's popularity on the bilingualism issue. Tory candidates were successful in three of those contests, and it appeared as if his government's stance had been vindicated. Weir called a general election for June 25, 1969, even though only three years had passed since the previous election.

That turned out to be a strategic error, particularly after the New Democratic Party selected Edward Schreyer as its leader during the campaign. Schreyer was a youthful and charismatic figure from the centrist wing of the NDP, and his party was able to win the support of many centre-left voters, including those who had voted for Pierre Trudeau's federal Liberals the previous year. The NDP won 28 seats against 22 for the Tories. On election night, Weir told his supporters, "The people have spoken. And the people are wrong."

The NDP being one seat short of a majority, it was not immediately clear who would form government. Weir initially flirted with supporting a coalition with the Manitoba Liberals in which former Liberal leader Gildas Molgat, despite his party finishing in third place, would have become Premier. However, that possibility came undone when Liberal MLA Laurent Desjardins threw his support to the NDP, which allowed Schreyer to replace Weir as Premier shortly thereafter.

Weir stepped down as PC leader in February 1971, and retired as an MLA in September of the same year. He did not re-enter political life.
