= John Crerar (Canadian politician) =

Canadian politician

John Crerar (September 22, 1848 – October 21, 1933) was a lawyer and political figure in Manitoba. As a Liberal, he represented Minnedosa in the Legislative Assembly of Manitoba from 1881 to 1883.

John Crerar was born in Perth County, Ontario and educated in Stratford, at Upper Canada College and the University of Toronto. He was called to the Ontario bar in 1877. After practising law in Ontario, he came west in 1879, settling in Minnedosa, Manitoba in May 1880. Crerar was called to the Manitoba bar in 1881. In 1899, he married Ida May Porteous. Crerar was the first mayor of Minnedosa. He also practised law in Birtle with Charles Mickle and in Melita. He was elected to the Manitoba assembly in an 1881 by-election after the western boundary of Manitoba was adjusted. Crerar did not run for reelection in 1883 but was defeated when he ran for reelection in 1886 and 1899. He retired in 1928, moved to California, and died in Long Beach.
