= Hugh Morrison (Manitoba politician) =

Canadian politician

Hugh Borthwick Morrison (December 16, 1892–January 9, 1957) was a politician in Manitoba, Canada. He served in the Legislative Assembly of Manitoba as a Progressive Conservative from 1936 until the time of his death.

He was born in Kaleida, Manitoba and served as reeve of the Rural Municipality of Pembina from 1935 to 1936. A farmer and auctioneer in private life, Morrison was first elected to the Manitoba legislature in the 1936 provincial election, defeating incumbent Liberal-Progressive Frank W. McIntosh by 351 votes in the constituency of Manitou. He was returned by acclamation in the 1941 election, after the Progressive Conservatives joined the Liberal-Progressives and other parties in a coalition government.

Morrison was again returned by acclamation in the 1945 election, albeit under unusual circumstances: his CCF opponent narrowly missed the deadline to declare his candidacy, and was unable to participate in the vote.

Morrison left the governing coalition in the late 1940s, after Liberal-Progressive Douglas Campbell was chosen as Premier of Manitoba. In the 1949 provincial election, he ran as an anti-coalition Progressive Conservative and defeated a pro-coalition Progressive Conservative by over 1,000 votes. The Progressive Conservatives left the coalition government in 1950, and Morrison rejoined the party caucus. He was easily re-elected over a Liberal-Progressive opponent in the 1953 election.

Morrison died in Morden in 1957, one year before the Progressive Conservatives won a minority government under Dufferin Roblin's leadership. His widow, Carolyne Morrison, served as a Progressive Conservative MLA from 1960 to 1969.
