= Dennis Heeney =

Dennis Heeney (March 22, 1933 – November 15, 2006) was a Manitoba politician. In the provincial elections of 1986 and 1988, he was the leader of the province's Confederation of Regions Party, a group that opposed the extension of French-language rights and sought greater autonomy for western Canada (unlike the Western Canada Concept and Western Independence Party, it did not seek full independence for the western provinces).

Heeney was serving as the reeve of the Rural Municipality of Elton in 1983 when he became active in a provincial controversy over the entrenchment of francophone services. At the time, NDP Premier Howard Pawley was attempting to reintroduce French-language services into the province's parliament and legal system. Heeney spoke out against the initiative at a public meeting in Brandon, claiming that it would effectively amount to granting special privileges for only 6% of Manitoba's population. Heeney subsequently became involved in Manitoba Grassroots, an anti-bilingualism coalition led by renegade NDP backbencher Russell Doern. In February 1984, he led a protest outside a Brandon NDP convention.

Later in the year, Heeney ran as a candidate for the national Confederation of Regions Party in the federal riding of Brandon-Souris. He received 6322 votes, finishing second to Progressive Conservative candidate Lee Clark (who received 18,813 votes).

A provincial CoR party was also founded in 1984, and Heeney replaced Douglas Edmondson as its leader shortly thereafter. The party ran fifteen candidates in the provincial election of 1986, placing second in four rural, anglophone ridings. Heeney, running in the riding of Minnedosa, received 1508 votes for a third-place finish.

Although this result was fairly respectable for a newly formed party, it disappointed many CoR supporters who hoped that at least a few of their candidates would be elected. The party declined in status, and became marginalized after the bilingualism controversy died down.

Heeney continued to lead the party into the election of 1988. The Manitoba CoR fielded fourteen candidates, although none came close to being elected. Heeney, running again in Minnedosa, received 820 votes for a fourth-place finish.

Heeney appears to have resigned as Manitoba CoR leader soon after the election. He returned to municipal politics, and served as reeve of Elton from 1978 to 2001.

== Sources ==
- Hebert, Raymond (2005). Manitoba's French-Language Crisis: A Cautionary Tale. McGill-Queen's Press. p. 293.
