= 35th Manitoba Legislature =

The members of the 35th Manitoba Legislature were elected in the Manitoba general election held in September 1990. The legislature sat from October 11, 1990, to March 21, 1995.

The Progressive Conservative Party led by Gary Filmon formed the government.

Gary Doer of the New Democratic Party was Leader of the Opposition.

Denis Rocan served as speaker for the assembly.

There were six sessions of the 35th Legislature:

Session	Start	End
1st	October 11, 1990	January 21, 1991
2nd	March 7, 1991	July 25, 1991
3rd	December 5, 1991	June 24, 1992
4th	November 26, 1992	July 27, 1993
5th	April 7, 1994	July 5, 1994
6th	December 1, 1994	March 20, 1995

George Johnson was Lieutenant Governor of Manitoba until March 5, 1993, when Yvon Dumont became lieutenant governor.

== Members of the Assembly ==
The following members were elected to the assembly in 1990:

Member	Electoral district	Party	First elected / previously elected	No.# of term(s)	Notes
James Downey	Arthur-Virden	Progressive Conservative	1977	5th term	
Linda McIntosh	Assiniboia	Progressive Conservative	1990	1st term	
Leonard Evans	Brandon East	NDP	1969	7th term	
James C. McCrae	Brandon West	Progressive Conservative	1986	3rd term	
Conrad Santos	Broadway	NDP	1981, (Note: Burrows) 1990	3rd term*	
Doug Martindale	Burrows	NDP	1990	1st term	
Jim Ernst	Charleswood	Progressive Conservative	1986	3rd term	
Gary Doer	Concordia	NDP	1986	3rd term	
Jim Carr	Crescentwood	Liberal	1988	2nd term	Until January 27, 1992
Avis Gray (1992)	Crescentwood	Liberal	1988, (Note: Ellice) 1992	2nd term*	From September 15, 1992
John Plohman	Dauphin	NDP	1981	4th term	
Jim Maloway	Elmwood	NDP	1986	3rd term	
Jack Penner	Emerson	Progressive Conservative	1988	2nd term	
Jerry Storie	Flin Flon	NDP	1981	4th term	
Rosemary Vodrey	Fort Garry	Progressive Conservative	1990	1st term	
Ed Helwer	Gimli	Progressive Conservative	1988	2nd term	
Denis Rocan	Gladstone	Progressive Conservative	1986	3rd term	
Kevin Lamoureux	Inkster	Liberal	1988	2nd term	
Clif Evans	Interlake	NDP	1990	1st term	
Dave Chomiak	Kildonan	NDP	1990	1st term	
Eric Stefanson	Kirkfield Park	Progressive Conservative	1990	1st term	
Darren Praznik	Lac du Bonnet	Progressive Conservative	1988	2nd term	
Harry Enns	Lakeside	Progressive Conservative	1966	8th term	
Ben Sveinson	La Verendrye	Progressive Conservative	1990	1st term	
Harold Gilleshammer	Minnedosa	Progressive Conservative	1988	2nd term	
Clayton Manness	Morris	Progressive Conservative	1981	4th term	
Jack Reimer	Niakwa	Progressive Conservative	1990	1st term	
Reg Alcock	Osborne	Liberal	1988	2nd term	Until July 23, 1993
Norma McCormick (1993)	Osborne	Liberal	1993	1st term	From September 23, 1993
Donald Orchard	Pembina	Progressive Conservative	1977	5th term	
George Hickes	Point Douglas	NDP	1990	1st term	
Ed Connery	Portage la Prairie	Progressive Conservative	1986	3rd term	Until June 23, 1992
Brian Pallister (1992)	Portage la Prairie	Progressive Conservative	1992	1st term	From September 15, 1992
Marianne Cerilli	Radisson	NDP	1990	1st term	
Gerry Ducharme	Riel	Progressive Conservative	1986	3rd term	
Bonnie Mitchelson	River East	Progressive Conservative	1986	3rd term	
Sharon Carstairs	River Heights	Liberal	1986	3rd term	
Len Derkach	Roblin-Russell	Progressive Conservative	1986	3rd term	
Harold Neufeld	Rossmere	Progressive Conservative	1988	2nd term	Until May 12, 1993
Harry Schellenberg (1993)	Rossmere	NDP	1993	1st term	From September 21, 1993
Elijah Harper	Rupertsland	NDP	1981	4th term	Until November 30, 1992
Eric Robinson (1993)	Rupertsland	NDP	1993	1st term	From September 21, 1993
Neil Gaudry	St. Boniface	Liberal	1988	2nd term	
Paul Edwards	St. James	Liberal	1988	2nd term	
Judy Wasylycia-Leis	St. Johns	NDP	1986	3rd term	Until August 12, 1993
Gord Mackintosh (1993)	St. Johns	NDP	1993	1st term	From September 21, 1993
Marcel Laurendeau	St. Norbert	Progressive Conservative	1990	1st term	
Shirley Render	St. Vital	Progressive Conservative	1990	1st term	
Glen Cummings	Ste. Rose	Progressive Conservative	1986	3rd term	
Louise Dacquay	Seine River	Progressive Conservative	1990	1st term	
Gregory Dewar	Selkirk	NDP	1990	1st term	
Glen Findlay	Springfield	Progressive Conservative	1986	3rd term	
Albert Driedger	Steinbach	Progressive Conservative	1977	5th term	
Gerry McAlpine	Sturgeon Creek	Progressive Conservative	1990	1st term	
Rosann Wowchuk	Swan River	NDP	1990	1st term	
Gulzar Cheema	The Maples	Liberal	1988	2nd term	Until June 17, 1993
Gary Kowalski (1993)	The Maples	Liberal	1993	1st term	From September 21, 1993
Oscar Lathlin	The Pas	NDP	1990	1st term	
Steve Ashton	Thompson	NDP	1981	4th term	
Daryl Reid	Transcona	NDP	1990	1st term	
Bob Rose	Turtle Mountain	Progressive Conservative	1990	1st term	
Gary Filmon	Tuxedo	Progressive Conservative	1979	5th term	
Becky Barrett	Wellington	NDP	1990	1st term	
Jean Friesen	Wolseley	NDP	1990	1st term	

== By-elections ==
By-elections were held to replace members for various reasons:

Electoral district	Member elected	Affiliation	Election date	Reason
Crescentwood	Avis Gray	Liberal	September 15, 1992	J Carr resigned January 27, 1992
Portage la Prairie	Brian Pallister	Progressive Conservative	September 15, 1992	E Connery resigned June 23, 1992
Osborne	Norma McCormick	Liberal	September 21, 1993	R Alcock resigned July 30, 1993, to run in federal election
Rossmere	Harry Schellenberg	NDP	September 21, 1993	H Neufeld resigned May 12, 1993
Rupertsland	Eric Robinson	NDP	September 21, 1993	E Harper resigned November 30, 1992, to run in federal election
St. Johns	Gord Mackintosh	NDP	September 21, 1993	J Wasylycia-Leis resigned August 12, 1993, to run in federal election
The Maples	Gary Kowalski	Liberal	September 21, 1993	G Cheema resigned June 17, 1993
