= 36th Manitoba Legislature =

The members of the 36th Manitoba Legislature were elected in the Manitoba general election held in April 1995. The legislature sat from May 23, 1995, to August 17, 1999.

The Progressive Conservative Party led by Gary Filmon formed the government.

Gary Doer of the New Democratic Party was Leader of the Opposition.

Louise Dacquay served as speaker for the assembly.

There were five sessions of the 36th Legislature:

| Session | Start | End |
|---|---|---|
| 1st | May 23, 1995 | November 3, 1995 |
| 2nd | December 5, 1995 | June 6, 1996 |
| 3rd | March 3, 1997 | June 27, 1997 |
| 4th | November 27, 1997 | June 29, 1998 |
| 5th | April 6, 1999 | July 14, 1999 |

Yvon Dumont was Lieutenant Governor of Manitoba until March 2, 1999, when Peter Liba became lieutenant governor.

== Members of the Assembly ==
The following members were elected to the assembly in 1995:

| Member | Electoral district | Party | First elected / previously elected | No.# of term(s) | Notes |
|---|---|---|---|---|---|
| James Downey | Arthur-Virden | Progressive Conservative | 1977 | 6th term | |
| Linda McIntosh | Assiniboia | Progressive Conservative | 1990 | 2nd term | |
| Leonard Evans | Brandon East | NDP | 1969 | 8th term | |
| James C. McCrae | Brandon West | Progressive Conservative | 1986 | 4th term | |
| Conrad Santos | Broadway | NDP | 1981, (Note: Burrows) 1990 | 4th term* | |
| Doug Martindale | Burrows | NDP | 1990 | 2nd term | |
| Jim Ernst | Charleswood | Progressive Conservative | 1986 | 4th term | Until October 28, 1997 |
| Myrna Driedger (1988) | Charleswood | Progressive Conservative | 1998 | 1st term | From April 28, 1998 |
| Gary Doer | Concordia | NDP | 1986 | 4th term | |
| Tim Sale | Crescentwood | NDP | 1995 | 1st term | |
| Stan Struthers | Dauphin | NDP | 1995 | 1st term | |
| Jim Maloway | Elmwood | NDP | 1986 | 4th term | |
| Jack Penner | Emerson | Progressive Conservative | 1988 | 3rd term | |
| Gerard Jennissen | Flin Flon | NDP | 1995 | 1st term | |
| Rosemary Vodrey | Fort Garry | Progressive Conservative | 1990 | 2nd term | |
| Ed Helwer | Gimli | Progressive Conservative | 1988 | 3rd term | |
| Denis Rocan | Gladstone | Progressive Conservative | 1986 | 4th term | |
| Kevin Lamoureux | Inkster | Liberal | 1988 | 3rd term | |
| Kevin Lamoureux | Inkster | Independent Liberal | 1988 | 3rd term | |
| Kevin Lamoureux | Inkster | Liberal | 1988 | 3rd term | |
| Clif Evans | Interlake | NDP | 1990 | 2nd term | |
| Dave Chomiak | Kildonan | NDP | 1990 | 2nd term | |
| Eric Stefanson | Kirkfield Park | Progressive Conservative | 1990 | 2nd term | |
| Darren Praznik | Lac du Bonnet | Progressive Conservative | 1988 | 3rd term | |
| Harry Enns | Lakeside | Progressive Conservative | 1966 | 9th term | |
| Ben Sveinson | La Verendrye | Progressive Conservative | 1990 | 2nd term | |
| Harold Gilleshammer | Minnedosa | Progressive Conservative | 1988 | 3rd term | |
| Frank Pitura | Morris | Progressive Conservative | 1995 | 1st term | |
| Jack Reimer | Niakwa | Progressive Conservative | 1990 | 2nd term | |
| Diane McGifford | Osborne | NDP | 1995 | 1st term | |
| Peter Dyck | Pembina | Progressive Conservative | 1995 | 1st term | |
| George Hickes | Point Douglas | NDP | 1990 | 2nd term | |
| Brian Pallister | Portage la Prairie | Progressive Conservative | 1992 | 2nd term | Until April 28, 1997 |
| David Faurschou (1997) | Portage la Prairie | Progressive Conservative | 1997 | 1st term | From September 30, 1997 |
| Marianne Cerilli | Radisson | NDP | 1990 | 2nd term | |
| David Newman | Riel | Progressive Conservative | 1995 | 1st term | |
| Bonnie Mitchelson | River East | Progressive Conservative | 1986 | 4th term | |
| Mike Radcliffe | River Heights | Progressive Conservative | 1995 | 1st term | |
| Len Derkach | Roblin-Russell | Progressive Conservative | 1986 | 4th term | |
| Vic Toews | Rossmere | Progressive Conservative | 1995 | 1st term | |
| Eric Robinson | Rupertsland | NDP | 1993 | 2nd term | |
| Neil Gaudry | St. Boniface | Liberal | 1988 | 3rd term | |
| MaryAnn Mihychuk | St. James | NDP | 1995 | 1st term | |
| Gord Mackintosh | St. Johns | NDP | 1993 | 2nd term | |
| Marcel Laurendeau | St. Norbert | Progressive Conservative | 1990 | 2nd term | |
| Shirley Render | St. Vital | Progressive Conservative | 1990 | 2nd term | |
| Glen Cummings | Ste. Rose | Progressive Conservative | 1986 | 4th term | |
| Louise Dacquay | Seine River | Progressive Conservative | 1990 | 2nd term | |
| Gregory Dewar | Selkirk | NDP | 1990 | 2nd term | |
| Glen Findlay | Springfield | Progressive Conservative | 1986 | 4th term | |
| Albert Driedger | Steinbach | Progressive Conservative | 1977 | 6th term | |
| Gerry McAlpine | Sturgeon Creek | Progressive Conservative | 1990 | 2nd term | |
| Rosann Wowchuk | Swan River | NDP | 1990 | 2nd term | |
| Gary Kowalski | The Maples | Liberal | 1993 | 2nd term | |
| Gary Kowalski | The Maples | Independent Liberal | 1993 | 2nd term | |
| Gary Kowalski | The Maples | Liberal | 1993 | 2nd term | |
| Oscar Lathlin | The Pas | NDP | 1990 | 2nd term | |
| Steve Ashton | Thompson | NDP | 1981 | 5th term | |
| Daryl Reid | Transcona | NDP | 1990 | 2nd term | |
| Merv Tweed | Turtle Mountain | Progressive Conservative | 1995 | 1st term | |
| Gary Filmon | Tuxedo | Progressive Conservative | 1979 | 6th term | |
| Becky Barrett | Wellington | NDP | 1990 | 2nd term | |
| Jean Friesen | Wolseley | NDP | 1990 | 2nd term | |

== By-elections ==
By-elections were held to replace members for various reasons:

| Electoral district | Member elected | Affiliation | Election date | Reason |
|---|---|---|---|---|
| Portage la Prairie | David Faurschou | Progressive Conservative | September 30, 1997 | B Pallister resigned April 28, 1997, to run for a federal seat |
| Charleswood | Myrna Driedger | Progressive Conservative | April 28, 1998 | J Ernst resigned October 28, 1997 |
