= 34th Manitoba Legislature =

Canadian provincial assembly

The members of the 34th Manitoba Legislature were elected in the Manitoba general election held in April 1988. The legislature sat from July 21, 1988, to August 7, 1990.

The Progressive Conservative Party led by Gary Filmon formed the government.

Sharon Carstairs of the Liberal Party was Leader of the Opposition.

Denis Rocan served as speaker for the assembly.

Native leader Elijah Harper blocked the introduction of the motion to ratify the Meech Lake Accord and so the Accord was not approved by the June 23, 1990, deadline.

Following the failure of the Accord, Premier Filmon called a snap election in September 1990 to take advantage of an increase in his popularity because he was now perceived as a strong defender of Manitoba's interests.

There were two sessions of the 34th Legislature:

Session	Start	End
1st	July 21, 1988	December 20, 1988
2nd	May 18, 1989	June 22, 1990

George Johnson was Lieutenant Governor of Manitoba.

== Members of the Assembly ==
The following members were elected to the assembly in 1988:

Member	Electoral district	Party	First elected / previously elected	No.# of term(s)	Notes
James Downey	Arthur	Progressive Conservative	1977	4th term	
Ed Mandrake	Assiniboia	Liberal	1988	1st term	
Leonard Evans	Brandon East	NDP	1969	6th term	
James C. McCrae	Brandon West	Progressive Conservative	1986	2nd term	
William Chornopyski	Burrows	Liberal	1988	1st term	
Jim Ernst	Charleswood	Progressive Conservative	1986	2nd term	
Jay Cowan	Churchill	NDP	1977	4th term	
Gary Doer	Concordia	NDP	1986	2nd term	
John Plohman	Dauphin	NDP	1981	3rd term	
Avis Gray	Ellice	Liberal	1988	1st term	
Jim Maloway	Elmwood	NDP	1986	2nd term	
Albert Driedger	Emerson	Progressive Conservative	1977	4th term	
Jerry Storie	Flin Flon	NDP	1981	3rd term	
Laurie Evans	Fort Garry	Liberal	1988	1st term	
Jim Carr	Fort Rouge	Liberal	1988	1st term	
Ed Helwer	Gimli	Progressive Conservative	1988	1st term	
Charlotte Oleson	Gladstone	Progressive Conservative	1981	3rd term	
Kevin Lamoureux	Inkster	Liberal	1988	1st term	
Bill Uruski	Interlake	NDP	1969	6th term	
Gulzar Cheema	Kildonan	Liberal	1988	1st term	
Gerrie Hammond	Kirkfield Park	Progressive Conservative	1981	3rd term	
Darren Praznik	Lac du Bonnet	Progressive Conservative	1988	1st term	
Harry Enns	Lakeside	Progressive Conservative	1966	7th term	
Helmut Pankratz	La Verendrye	Progressive Conservative	1986	2nd term	
Maureen Hemphill	Logan	NDP	1981	3rd term	
Harold Gilleshammer	Minnedosa	Progressive Conservative	1988	1st term	
Clayton Manness	Morris	Progressive Conservative	1981	3rd term	
Herold Driedger	Niakwa	Liberal	1988	1st term	
Reg Alcock	Osborne	Liberal	1988	1st term	
Donald Orchard	Pembina	Progressive Conservative	1977	4th term	
Ed Connery	Portage la Prairie	Progressive Conservative	1986	2nd term	
Allan Patterson	Radisson	Liberal	1988	1st term	
Jack Penner	Rhineland	Progressive Conservative	1988	1st term	
Gerry Ducharme	Riel	Progressive Conservative	1986	2nd term	
Bonnie Mitchelson	River East	Progressive Conservative	1986	2nd term	
Sharon Carstairs	River Heights	Liberal	1986	2nd term	
Len Derkach	Roblin-Russell	Progressive Conservative	1986	2nd term	
Harold Neufeld	Rossmere	Progressive Conservative	1988	1st term	
Elijah Harper	Rupertsland	NDP	1981	3rd term	
Neil Gaudry	St. Boniface	Liberal	1988	1st term	
Paul Edwards	St. James	Liberal	1988	1st term	
Judy Wasylycia-Leis	St. Johns	NDP	1986	2nd term	
John Angus	St. Norbert	Liberal	1988	1st term	
Bob Rose	St. Vital	Liberal	1988	1st term	
Glen Cummings	Ste. Rose	Progressive Conservative	1986	2nd term	
Gwen Charles	Selkirk	Liberal	1988	1st term	
Mark Minenko	Seven Oaks	Liberal	1988	1st term	
Gilles Roch	Springfield	Progressive Conservative	1986	2nd term	Until September 8, 1988
Gilles Roch	Springfield	Liberal	1986	2nd term	From September 8, 1988
Iva Yeo	Sturgeon Creek	Liberal	1988	1st term	
Parker Burrell	Swan River	Progressive Conservative	1988	1st term	
Harry Harapiak	The Pas	NDP	1981	3rd term	
Steve Ashton	Thompson	NDP	1981	3rd term	
Richard Kozak	Transcona	Liberal	1988	1st term	
Denis Rocan	Turtle Mountain	Progressive Conservative	1986	2nd term	
Gary Filmon	Tuxedo	Progressive Conservative	1979	4th term	
Glen Findlay	Virden	Progressive Conservative	1986	2nd term	
Harold Taylor	Wolseley	Liberal	1988	1st term	

== By-elections ==
None
