= Manitoba Liberal Party leadership elections =

The Manitoba Liberal Party, a political party in the Canadian province of Manitoba, has chosen most of its leaders by delegated leadership conventions. Since 1993, the Manitoba Liberal Party has chosen its leaders by an open vote of party members, weighted by riding.

The party's first leader, Thomas Greenway, does not appear to have faced any formal opposition when he created the party in 1882/1883.

== 1906 leadership convention ==
(Held on March 28, 1906.)

- Edward Brown, acclaimed

== 1910 leadership convention ==
(Held April 5, 1910.)

- Tobias Norris, acclaimed

== 1927 leadership convention ==
(Held on March 20, 1927.)

- Hugh Robson winner on first ballot, vote totals not announced
- Fred C. Hamilton
- A.W. Myles

== 1931 leadership convention ==
(Held on June 26, 1931.)

- Murdoch Mackay winner, vote totals not announced
- Fred C. Hamilton

== Liberal-Progressive Party period ==
No leadership conventions were held during the existence of the Liberal-Progressive Party (1932–1961). John Bracken was leader of the Progressive Party of Manitoba when the Liberal-Progressive coalition was formed in 1932, and was subsequently recognized as the leader of the merged party. Stuart Garson was the unanimous choice of coalition Members of the Legislative Assembly (MLAs) to replace Bracken, in a vote held on December 22, 1942.

In 1948, Douglas L. Campbell was selected as Premier by a vote among MLAs in the governing Liberal-Progressive/Progressive Conservative coalition, defeating Progressive Conservative leader Errick Willis.

== 1961 leadership convention ==
(Held on April 20, 1961.)

- Gildas Molgat 475
- Stan Roberts 279
- Francis Bud Jobin 79
- Lloyd Henderson 27

== 1969 leadership convention ==
(Held on May 10, 1969.)

- Robert Bend 877
- Duncan Edmonds 483
- Bernie Wolfe 142
- Lloyd Henderson 16
- Gildas Molgat 3 (these ballots were spoiled; Molgat was not a candidate)

== 1970 leadership convention ==
(Held on October 31, 1970.)

- Israel Asper 720
- John Nesbitt 329

== 1975 leadership convention ==
(Held on February 22, 1975.)

- Charles Huband 381
- Lloyd Henderson 87

== 1980 leadership convention ==
(Held on November 30, 1980.)

- Doug Lauchlan 493
- Hugh Moran 300

Bill Jackson was originally a candidate, but dropped out in October 1980. He had been considered a frontrunner.

== 1984 leadership convention ==
(Held on, March 4, 1984.)

- Sharon Carstairs 307
- Bill Ridgeway 238
- Alan de Jardin 21
- Stephen Zaretski 11

== 1993 leadership election ==
(Held on June 5, 1993.)

- Paul Edwards 1,087
- Kevin Lamoureux 851

== 1996 leadership election ==
(Held on October 16, 1996.)

- Ginny Hasselfield 958
- Kevin Lamoureux 937

Had the results not been weighted by constituency, Lamoureux would have defeated Hasselfield by 1,019 votes to 997.

== 1998 leadership election ==
(Held on October 17, 1998.)

- Jon Gerrard 1,336
- Jerry Fontaine 832

== 2013 leadership election ==
(Held on October 26, 2013)

- Rana Bokhari 431
- Dougald Lamont 285
- Bob Axworthy 131

== 2017 leadership election ==
(Held on October 21, 2017)

=== First ballot ===
- Cindy Lamoureux 363
- Dougald Lamont 301
- Jon Gerrard 230

Gerrard eliminated, endorses Lamoureux

=== Second ballot ===
- Dougald Lamont 296
- Cindy Lamoureux 288

== 2025 leadership election ==
The 2025 leadership election was scheduled to be held on October 25. However, Willard Reaves was the only candidate who met the requirements of running for leader. He was declared leader on September 29.

=== Acclaimed ===
- Willard Reaves, former football player and MLP deputy leader (2023–2024)

== See also ==
- Leadership convention
- Manitoba Liberal Party
