= Jon Gerrard =

Canadian politician (born 1947)

The Honourable Jon Gerrard PC
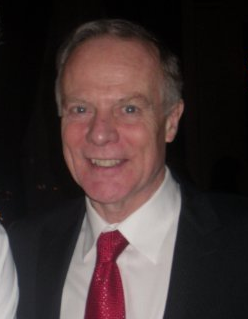
- Gerrard in 2011

Leader of the Manitoba Liberal Party
- In office October 17, 1998 – October 26, 2013
- Preceded by: Ginny Hasselfield
- Succeeded by: Rana Bokhari

Secretary of State (Western Economic Diversification)
- In office January 25, 1996 – June 10, 1997
- Prime Minister: Jean Chrétien
- Minister: John Manley
- Preceded by: Position established
- Succeeded by: Ronald J. Duhamel

Secretary of State (Science, Research and Development)
- In office November 4, 1993 – June 10, 1997
- Prime Minister: Jean Chrétien
- Minister: John Manley
- Preceded by: Position established
- Succeeded by: Ronald J. Duhamel

Member of the Legislative Assembly of Manitoba for River Heights
- In office September 21, 1999 – September 5, 2023
- Preceded by: Mike Radcliffe
- Succeeded by: Mike Moroz

Member of Parliament for Portage—Interlake
- In office October 25, 1993 – June 2, 1997
- Preceded by: Felix Holtmann
- Succeeded by: Howard Hilstrom (for Selkirk—Interlake)

Personal details
- Born: October 13, 1947 (age 78) Birmingham, England
- Party: Manitoba Liberal
- Other political affiliations: Liberal
- Spouse: Naomi Gerrard
- Education: University of Saskatchewan; McGill University; University of Minnesota
- Profession: Physician

Jon Gerrard PC (born October 13, 1947) is a politician in Manitoba, Canada. He was a Member of Parliament (MP) from 1993 to 1997, and was a secretary of state in the government of Jean Chrétien. He was the leader of the Manitoba Liberal Party from 1998 until 2013, and the member of the Legislative Assembly of Manitoba for River Heights from 1999 until his defeat in 2023.

== Early life and private career ==
Gerrard was born in Birmingham, England, and grew up in Saskatoon, Saskatchewan. He holds a Bachelor of Arts degree in economics from the University of Saskatchewan (1967), a Doctor of Medicine degree from McGill University (1971), a Doctor of Philosophy degree from the University of Minnesota (1976), and a Certificate in Pediatrics from the American Academy of Pediatrics (1976). He worked at several prominent American institutions in the 1970s, and returned to Canada in 1980 to accept a position as pediatrician at the Winnipeg Children's Hospital. Gerrard served as head of Pediatric Hematology/Oncology at this hospital from 1985 to 1992, and taught at the University of Manitoba from 1980 to 1993. He has authored or co-authored over 200 scientific publications, and became known during the 1980s as an expert on the research and treatment of cancer in children. Gerrard has also been interested in bald eagles since his teenage years, and co-authored a book entitled The Bald Eagle: Haunts and Habits of a Wilderness Monarch in 1988. He has been studying eagles at Besnard Lake in Saskatchewan for 50 years.

Gerrard became active with the Liberal Party of Canada while working on his undergraduate degree, impressed with Prime Minister Lester B. Pearson's positions on social and international issues. He was a delegate to the Liberal Party's 1968 leadership convention, supporting John Turner. He later volunteered for the "Non" side in the 1980 Quebec referendum, and became Liberal riding president for Lisgar in 1984. In 1990, he was Manitoba co-chair of Jean Chrétien's successful bid for the Liberal Party leadership.

== Government minister and federal political career ==
Gerrard was elected to the House of Commons of Canada in the 1993 federal election, defeating two-term Progressive Conservative incumbent Felix Holtmann in the riding of Portage—Interlake. On November 4, 1993, he was appointed as Secretary of State for Science, Research and Development. This was not a full cabinet portfolio, but was instead affiliated with Industry Canada. Gerrard worked closely with Industry Minister John Manley, and oversaw the development of such programs as Technology Partnerships Canada, the Canadian Foundation for Innovation, and the Canada Research Chairs.

=== Internet and communications strategies ===
Gerrard outlined the Chrétien government's strategy for the burgeoning information highway in February 1994, as internet use increased throughout the country. One of this strategy's goals was to "[put] Canada in cyberspace", by creating a "national network of networks" within the new media. Gerrard indicated that his plan would be targeted toward creating jobs, reinforcing Canada's cultural identity, and ensuring universal internet access at affordable rates. He officially launched an $80 million action plan on January 30, 1995, providing funding for online applications in the fields of business, research, health care and education.

In March 1994, Gerrard described the internet as "very much a Liberal technology in the sense that it is much more individual than collective". Speaking to an interviewer in 2007, he said that the highlight of his political career was convincing the Chrétien government to include a reference to the information highway in its first throne speech.

Gerrard's 1994 strategic statement on the information highway also addressed the subject of industry mergers in the communications sector. He indicated that the Chrétien government would "apply pro-competition policies wherever ... they make sense" and added:

Traditionally, firms in telecommunications, broadcasting, cable and information industries have operated in separate markets enjoying neither competition nor collaboration. We now know this lack of competition has caused us to fall behind the U.S. in the provision and price of advanced telecommunications services.

=== Science and technology strategies ===
In June 1994, Manley and Gerrard ordered a full review of federal science and technology policy. This process had three aspects: an internal review, an independent assessment from the National Advisory Board on Science and Technology, and a series of consultations with interested Canadians. Gerrard personally supervised the review's consultative sessions, and was appointed as vice-chairman of the National Advisory Board. The government's new strategy was issued in March 1996, outlining new plans for funding and tax credits.

The Chrétien government's approach to funding the science and technology sectors received mixed reviews. Some criticized the government for cutting several research and science positions during the recession of the early 1990s, although at least one technological journal credited it with maintaining research and development incentives in the austerity budget of 1995. Gerrard himself was described a "passionate advocate" of research investment, and as the driving force behind the government's National Technology Investment Program of 1996.

=== Additional duties ===
Gerrard was given additional responsibilities as Secretary of State for Western Economic Diversification on January 25, 1996. He oversaw the expansion of the Community Futures Development Corporation Network throughout Western Canada, and worked with Foreign Affairs Minister Lloyd Axworthy to ensure a secure transition of the Port of Churchill rail line from Canadian National to OmniTRAX.

=== Other ===
Gerrard voted in favour of the Chrétien government's national gun registry program in late 1994, despite some personal reservations. The registry was unpopular with many rural Manitobans, and Gerrard remarked to John Manley soon after the vote that it would likely cost him his seat in the next election.

=== 1997 election ===
The Portage—Interlake riding disappeared with redistribution before the 1997 election. Gerrard ran in the new riding of Selkirk—Interlake, and lost to Reform Party candidate Howard Hilstrom by 66 votes in a very close three-way contest.

Gerrard returned to his work at the Winnipeg Children's Hospital after his defeat. He also became a Medical Research Council of Canada scholar in residence at the University of Manitoba's medical school and applied to become Dean of Medicine, as well as returning to his research work on bald eagles.

== Leadership of the Manitoba Liberal Party and provincial political career ==
Gerrard returned to active political life in 1998, as leader of the Manitoba Liberal Party.

After winning only three seats in the 1995 provincial election and losing its official status in the legislature (which it had enjoyed since 1988), the provincial Liberal Party had nearly disintegrated in 1997 under the leadership of Ginny Hasselfield. She resigned in February 1998, and Gerrard declared his candidacy to succeed her. Supported by former leader Sharon Carstairs, he defeated the only other candidate, former Sagkeeng First Nation chief Jerry Fontaine.

=== Elections ===
==== 1999 ====
Gerrard set modest goals for his party in the 1999 provincial election, saying that the Liberals could win between ten and fifteen seats to hold the balance of power in a minority government. He focused his attention on health care, and pledged that he would serve as his own Minister of Health if elected as Premier. He also promised to appoint a health ombudsman, commit $25 million toward repairing provincial infrastructure, provide $20 million for post-secondary education, end provincial clawbacks of federal tax credits for welfare recipients, and create a new Ministry of Digital Economy and the Information Highway.

The Liberal Party was unable to run a full electoral slate, fielding candidates in only 50 of 57 divisions. Gerrard tried to deflect criticism by joking that he would "put his 50 Liberal candidates up against 57 Tory and NDP candidates any day", but the failure to run a full slate unquestionably damaged his party's prospects.

On election day, Gerrard personally defeated incumbent Progressive Conservative cabinet minister Mike Radcliffe in the upscale Winnipeg division of River Heights, which Carstairs had previously represented, but the Liberals won no other seats. The party's popular vote fell from 23% to 13%, as many former Liberal voters shifted to the victorious New Democratic Party under Gary Doer.

Gerrard was the only Liberal member of the Manitoba legislature between 1999 and 2003. He was not personally blamed for the party's loss, and was reaffirmed as party leader in 2000.

==== 2003 ====
Popular support for the Liberal Party increased after the 1999 election, reaching 24% in July 2001 and remaining in the low twenties throughout 2002 and 2003. The party entered the 2003 election in a much improved position from four years earlier: their divisions were largely resolved and their financial situation more secure, and they were able to field a candidate in every division.

Gerrard promised tax cuts for Manitobans under thirty and the elimination of the province's payroll tax, and committed to a "health-care guarantee" wherein the government would fund out-of-province health care if services could not be provided within Manitoba. He also promised to create an organization that would integrate health services from different fields, and to establish community health centres for seniors.

Liberal support declined in the final stage of the campaign, and the party ultimately polled a slightly lower percentage of votes relative to its 1999 result. Gerrard was nevertheless returned without difficulty in River Heights, and former Member of the Legislative Assembly (MLA) Kevin Lamoureux gave the party a second seat by retaking his old division of Inkster.

==== 2007 ====
The Liberal Party's 2007 campaign was centred around five issues: health care waiting lists, threatened emergency room closures in Winnipeg, university funding, urban sprawl, and the environmental state of Lake Winnipeg. The Liberals also pledged to provide immediate funding for rapid transit in Winnipeg, phase out the provincial payroll tax while reducing property taxes by as much as 30%, and introduce a new police unit to protect children from sexual exploitation. The party also stressed an environmentally conscious image, purchasing carbon credits to run a carbon-neutral campaign.

Gerrard and Lamoureux were again returned to the legislature, but no other Liberals were elected and the party's popular vote slipped again to just under 12.5%.

==== 2017 ====
After being re-elected in 2011, Gerrard resigned as leader and was replaced by Rana Bokhari. He was re-elected in 2016. Gerrard ran for leader again in 2017, but placed third. He was re-elected in 2019.

==== 2023 ====
The 2023 campaign was dominated by the ailing healthcare system, affordability, and multiple social issues such as parental rights and MMIW. The governing Progressive Conservatives were very unpopular throughout the COVID-19 pandemic, which lead to the resignation of premier Brian Pallister in 2021 and his subsequent replacement as premier by then health minister Heather Stefanson. The NDP, led by Wab Kinew, which had led in the polls for more than two years in the lead up to the election, specifically targeted Liberal voters to vote strategically and prevent vote splitting on the left. In River Heights, NDP targeting made this a more difficult campaign for Gerrard than in elections prior. Running against Gerrard for the NDP was Mike Moroz, a local teacher who had become a prominent activist against the provincial education Bill 64 in 2021.

On election night, Moroz defeated Gerrard by roughly 6% in the riding, as the NDP would also go on to win a majority government. The result was seen as a major upset, considering the past tilt the riding had towards the Liberals and Gerrard's personal popularity in the riding. Gerrard said in interview after his defeat that he got "caught in an orange wave" with strategic voting and anger towards the governing Conservatives denying him another term. Liberal leader Dougald Lamont also lost his re-election bid in St. Boniface, part of an overall poor result for the Liberals. Cindy Lamoureux was the lone Liberal MLA elected in 2023, in which she was re-elected in the riding of Tyndall Park. Gerrard was the longest-serving incumbent MLA to lose re-election in 2023, and at the time was tied with PC MLA Ron Schuler as the second longest-serving MLA in Manitoba. (The longest-serving MLA at the end of the 42nd Manitoba Legislature, outgoing Legislative Assembly speaker Myrna Driedger, retired.)

=== Issues ===
==== Health care ====
Gerrard was involved with health issues throughout his time in the legislature. In 2001, he protested the Doer government's decision to close an outpatient pharmacy at the Winnipeg Health Sciences Centre by bringing several families of child cancer patients to the legislature to confront the health minister. He later called for changes to Manitoba's adult heart surgery program, after figures obtained through a freedom of information request showed an increasing number of fatalities.

Gerrard wrote a Winnipeg Free Press column criticizing the Doer government for health-care delays in 2005, and later argued that personal health information should be made more easily accessible to patients and their families. He released a detailed document promoting change in Manitoba's health system in September 2007, highlighted by a call to make regional health authorities more accountable to citizens.

==== Agriculture and environment ====
Shortly after the 1999 election, Gerrard took part in an all-party delegation to Ottawa to lobby the federal government for a cash bailout for struggling western farmers.

In early 2004, Gerrard wrote a guest column in the Winnipeg Free Press calling on the federal government to test every beef and dairy cow over thirty months for bovine spongiform encephalopathy (BSE). This recommendation was made during a significant decline in the Canadian cattle market, after the discovery of a BSE-infected cow in Alberta caused the United States to block all Canadian cattle.

Also in 2004, Gerrard accused the Doer government of undermining its water-quality legislation by reducing funds for key programs.

==== Social issues ====
Gerrard holds liberal views on social issues. He pressured the Doer government to legalize adoption rights for same-sex couples in 2001, one year before a comprehensive bill including adoption rights was passed by the legislature.

Gerrard took part in the Winnipeg Harvest Poverty Challenge in late 2002, and attempted to live for a full week on only $20. The challenge was meant to draw attention to the difficulties faced by Manitoba's lowest-income residents, living on social assistance.

In 2003, Gerrard supported calls for a provincial smoking ban in workplaces and enclosed public spaces.

==== Other issues ====
In early 2005, Gerrard wrote that the Doer government had not taken proper steps to regulate the province's burgeoning internet pharmaceutical industry. This industry was popular with American customers, and Gerrard's column was written at a time when the federal government was seeking to impose greater control over the sector.

In April 2007, Gerrard introduced a private member's bill entitled the Apology Act, to make apologies inadmissible in court as proof of liability or guilt. The bill was modeled after similar legislation in British Columbia, and was intended to allow medical professionals to apologize to patients without risking legal charges. It was passed into law with government support in November 2007, and formally took effect in February 2008.

Gerrard has also called for a public inquiry into the New Democratic Party government's alleged role in failing to prevent the financial collapse of the Crocus Investment Fund. Following the 2007 election, he took part in an all-party delegation to Ottawa to argue for increased penalties against gang-related criminals and young car thieves. He has also called for a public review of appointees to the Manitoba Hydro Board, and requested a plebiscite on the location of a power line from northern to southern Manitoba.

In October 2007, he introduced a bill to ban retailers from using plastic bags by 2009. He also criticized the Doer government's decision to build a Manitoba Hydro power line on the west side of Lake Winnipeg, and called for the public to be directly consulted on the issue through non-binding referendums.

He called for a provincial moratorium on taser use in 2007, following increased concerns about its safety.

=== Other ===
Despite his background as a Chrétien supporter, Gerrard was reported to have endorsed Paul Martin's bid for the federal Liberal Party leadership in 2003. He supported Gerard Kennedy's bid in 2006.

Gerrard released a history of the Manitoba Liberal Party in 2006, entitled Battling for a Better Manitoba. A Winnipeg Free Press reviewer described the book as "a generally readable—though sloppy—account of one of the three provincial parties", adding that the book "perhaps should not have been published in its current state".

== Electoral record ==
2023 Manitoba general election: River Heights
Party	Candidate	Votes	%	±%	Expenditures
New Democratic	Mike Moroz	5,047	44.21	+29.63	$34,794.42
Liberal	Jon Gerrard	4,404	38.58	-15.22	$15,378.75
Progressive Conservative	Tim Burt	1,807	15.83	-8.87	$15,741.18
Green	Nathan Zahn	158	1.38	-5.54	$0.00
Total valid votes/expense limit		11,416	99.63	–	$66,065.00
Total rejected and declined ballots		42	0.37	–	
Turnout		11,458	67.59	+2.12	
Eligible voters		16,951			
New Democratic gain from Liberal		Swing		+22.42	
Source(s) Source: Elections Manitoba

2019 Manitoba general election: River Heights
Party	Candidate	Votes	%	±%	Expenditures
Liberal	Jon Gerrard	5,884	53.79	+1.89	$20,360.48
Progressive Conservative	Susan Boulter	2,702	24.70	-9.82	$15,457.28
New Democratic	Jonathan Niemczak	1,595	14.58	+8.72	$2,138.19
Green	Nathan Zahn	757	6.92	-0.73	$0.00
Total valid votes		10,938	99.69		
Total rejected ballots		34	0.31		
Turnout		10,972	65.48		
Eligible voters		16,757			

2016 Manitoba general election: River Heights
Party	Candidate	Votes	%	±%	Expenditures
Liberal	Jon Gerrard	5,230	51.90	+5.99	$24,782.14
Progressive Conservative	Tracey Maconachie	3,485	34.58	+1.82	$35,477.22
Green	Michael Cardillo	771	7.65	+4.08	$1,180.63
New Democratic	Shafagh Daneshfar	591	5.86	-11.90	$671.90
Total valid votes/expense limit		10,077	100.00	-	$44,532.00
Total rejected ballots		79	–	–	
Turnout		10,156	72.70	–	
Eligible voters		13,969			
Source: Elections Manitoba

2011 Manitoba general election: River Heights
Party	Candidate	Votes	%	±%	Expenditures
Liberal	Jon Gerrard	4,742	45.91	−5.15	$35,683.03
Progressive Conservative	Marty Morantz	3,384	32.76	+7.65	$37,469.17
New Democratic	Dan Manning	1,835	17.76	−2.01	$10,119.45
Green	Elizabeth May Cameron	370	3.57	−0.48	$498.55
Total valid votes		10,358			
Rejected and declined votes		29			
Turnout		10,387	72.51	+3.17	
Electors on the lists		14,325			
Source: Elections Manitoba

2007 Manitoba general election: River Heights
Party	Candidate	Votes	%	±%	Expenditures
Liberal	Jon Gerrard	4,760	51.06	+2.36	$24,934.03
Progressive Conservative	Ashley Burner	2,341	25.11	−3.84	$30,166.89
New Democratic	Fiona Shiells	1,843	19.77	+0.03	$3,859.68
Green	Christine Bennet-Clark	378	4.05	+1.79	$861.98
Total valid votes		9,322	100.00		
Rejected and declined votes		22			
Turnout		9,344	69.34	+1.91	
Electors on the lists		13,475			
Source: Elections Manitoba

2003 Manitoba general election: River Heights
Party	Candidate	Votes	%	±%	Expenditures
Liberal	Jon Gerrard	4,500	48.70	+3.70	$29,690.35
Progressive Conservative	Mike Radcliffe	2,675	28.95	−12.00	$24,419.68
New Democratic	Kristin Bingeman	1,824	19.74	+6.76	$4,053.34
Green	Linda Goossen	209	2.26	+1.46	$49.68
Libertarian	Clancy Smith	32	0.35	+0.08	$0.00
Total valid votes		9,240	100.00		
Rejected and declined votes		31			
Turnout		9,271	67.43	−6.24	
Electors on the lists		13,749			

1999 Manitoba general election: River Heights
Party	Candidate	Votes	%	±%	Expenditures
Liberal	Jon Gerrard	5,173	45.00	+5.80	$30,877.93
Progressive Conservative	Mike Radcliffe	4,708	40.95	-7.03	$28,010.25
New Democratic	Peter Reimer	1,492	12.98	+1.03	$3,101.00
Green	Chris Billows	92	0.80	n/a	$55.40
Libertarian	Clancy Smith	31	0.27	-0.59	$443.82
Total valid votes		11,496	100.00		
Rejected and declined votes		41			
Turnout		11,537	83.67		
Electors on the lists		13,788			

1997 Canadian federal election: Selkirk—Interlake
Party	Candidate	Votes	%	Expenditures
Reform	Howard Hilstrom	10,937	28.30	$23,194
Liberal	Jon Gerrard	10,871	28.13	$59,732
New Democratic	Kathleen McCallum	10,749	27.81	$46,587
Progressive Conservative	Reid Kelner	5,730	14.83	$32,267
Christian Heritage	Paul Kalyniuk	363	0.94	$1,578
Total valid votes		38,650	100.00	
Total rejected ballots		258		
Turnout		38,908	65.48	
Electors on the lists		59,422		
Sources: Official Results, Elections Canada and Financial Returns, Elections Canada.

1993 Canadian federal election: Portage—Interlake
Party	Candidate	Votes	%	Expenditures
Liberal	Jon Gerrard	14,506	40.68	$48,438
Reform	Don Sawatsky	9,801	27.48	$40,040
Progressive Conservative	Felix Holtmann	7,036	19.73	$67,866
New Democratic	Connie Gretsinger	3,029	8.49	$6,976
National	Mel Christian	935	2.62	$2,756
Natural Law	Gary Schwartz	179	0.50	$0
Libertarian	Dennis Rice	92	0.26	$275
Canada Party	Hans C. Kjear	83	0.23	$0
Total valid votes		35,661	100.00	
Total rejected ballots		119		
Turnout		35,780	69.10	
Electors on the lists		51,779		
Source: Thirty-fifth General Election, 1993: Official Voting Results, Published by the Chief Electoral Officer of Canada. Financial figures taken from official contributions and expenses provided by Elections Canada.

All electoral information is taken from Elections Canada and Elections Manitoba. Provincial expenditures refer to candidate expenses.

Parliament of Canada
Preceded by Felix Holtmann	Member of Parliament for Portage—Interlake; 1993–1997	Electoral district abolished
Legislative Assembly of Manitoba
Preceded by Mike Radcliffe	Member of the Legislative Assembly of Manitoba for River Heights; 1999–present	Incumbent
26th Canadian Ministry (1993–2003) – Cabinet of Jean Chrétien
Government Posts (2)
Predecessor	Title	Successor
position created in 1996	Secretary of State (Western Economic Diversification) (1996–1997)	Ron Duhamel
position created in 1993	Secretary of State (Science, Research and Development) (1993–1997)	Ron Duhamel
Party political offices
Preceded by Ginny Hasselfield; Neil Gaudry (acting)	Leader of the Manitoba Liberal Party; 1998–2013	Succeeded by Rana Bokhari
