= Mike Radcliffe =

Canadian politician (born 1944)

Michael Frederick Carrington Radcliffe (born December 16, 1944) is a lawyer and former politician in Manitoba, Canada. He served as a member of the Legislative Assembly of Manitoba from 1995 to 1999, and was a cabinet minister in the government of Premier Gary Filmon from 1997 to 1999.

The son of Leslie Radcliffe and Edith Bole, he was born in Winnipeg, Manitoba, and earned a Bachelor of Arts degree and an LL.B. from the University of Manitoba. From 1970 to 1996, he was a partner in the firm of Baker, Radcliffe, Murray, Kovnats. Radcliffe was involved in Freemasonry but is now the Grand Knight for the St. Ignatius Church council (#5808) of the Knights of Columbus. In 1974, he married Linda Anne Leach.

In 1912, Radcliffe's father was planning to travel on what turned out to be the only voyage of the RMS Titanic with his uncle Charles Sedgwick and aunt Adelaide, who were on their way to Mexico City. In the end, because of concerns about safety related to the Mexican Revolution, Charles made the voyage alone; his body was never found.

In the Canadian general election of 1993, Radcliffe ran as a candidate of the Progressive Conservative Party in the riding of Winnipeg South Centre. The riding was represented by Lloyd Axworthy MP at the time, and was considered safe for the Liberal Party; Radcliffe came in third with only 3,878 votes, against Axworthy's 25,667.

In the provincial election of 1995, Radcliffe ran as a Progressive Conservative in the upscale west-end Winnipeg riding of River Heights, which contained much of the territory represented federally by Winnipeg South Centre. He was successful on this occasion, defeating Liberal Anita Neville (later the MP for Winnipeg South Centre from 2000 to 2011) by 994 votes. He flipped the seat from Liberal to PC, as the former Liberal leader Sharon Carstairs had resigned to accept an appointment to the Senate of Canada.

On January 6, 1997, Gary Filmon, the premier of Manitoba, appointed Radcliffe to the Executive Council of Manitoba, as Minister of Consumer and Corporate Affairs with responsibility for the Gaming Control Act. On February 5, 1999, he became the province's Minister of Labour, with responsibility for the Civil Service Act, the Civil Service Superannuation Act, the Civil Service Special Supplementary Severance Benefits Act (1983), the Public Servants Insurance Act and the Workers Compensation Act.

Filmon's Progressive Conservatives lost government to the New Democratic Party under Gary Doer in the provincial election of 1999. The NDP did not have a strong base in River Heights, and Radcliffe would probably have been re-elected under normal circumstances. However, provincial Liberal leader Jon Gerrard decided to contest the riding. Although the Liberals as a whole ran a poor provincial campaign and lost 10% from their 1995 support level, Gerrard was personally popular enough that he defeated Radcliffe by 465 votes.

Radcliffe attempted to defeat Gerrard in a rematch in the 2003 provincial election but lost by almost 2,000 votes.

In 2004, Radcliffe was the official campaign agent for Raj Joshi, Conservative candidate in Winnipeg South Centre.

== Electoral history ==
1993 Canadian federal election: Winnipeg South Centre
Party	Candidate	Votes	%	±%
Liberal	Lloyd Axworthy	25,881	61.44	+3.01
Reform	Vern A. Hannah	5,288	12.55	+10.82
Progressive Conservative	Mike Radcliffe	3,903	9.26	−19.64
New Democratic	Lloyd Penner	3,512	8.34	−2.01
National	Bill Loewen	3,099	7.36	
Natural Law	Elizabeth Innes	225	0.53	
Libertarian	Clancy Smith	89	0.21	−0.13
Independent	Karen Naylor	76	0.18	
Canada Party	Ben J. Fulawka	54	0.13	
Total valid votes		42,127	100.0	
Liberal hold		Swing		-3.90
