= Mike Moroz =

Canadian politician

The Honourable Mike Moroz MLA

Minister of Innovation and New Technology
- Incumbent
- Assumed office November 13, 2024
- Premier: Wab Kinew
- Preceded by: Portfolio established

Member of the Legislative Assembly of Manitoba for River Heights
- Incumbent
- Assumed office October 3, 2023
- Preceded by: Jon Gerrard

Personal details
- Born: Michael Peter Moroz; November 8, 1962 (age 63) Spirit River, Alberta, Canada
- Party: New Democratic
- Spouse: Christine Moroz
- Education: University of Alberta (BEd); Central Washington University

Michael Peter Moroz (born November 8, 1962) is a Canadian politician, who was elected to the Legislative Assembly of Manitoba in the 2023 Manitoba general election. He represents the district of River Heights as a member of the Manitoba New Democratic Party.

Prior to being elected, Moroz was a high school teacher. He grew up in Northern Alberta, then moved to Vancouver Island before moving to Winnipeg. He was also an actor and casting director. He was in one episode of Alienated.

On November 13, 2024, he was appointed Minister of Innovation and New Technology in the Kinew ministry.

== Electoral history ==
2023 Manitoba general election: River Heights
| Party | Candidate | Votes | % | ±% | Expenditures |
|---|---|---|---|---|---|
| New Democratic | Mike Moroz | 5,047 | 44.21 | +29.63 | $34,794.42 |
| Liberal | Jon Gerrard | 4,404 | 38.58 | -15.22 | $15,378.75 |
| Progressive Conservative | Tim Burt | 1,807 | 15.83 | -8.87 | $15,741.18 |
| Green | Nathan Zahn | 158 | 1.38 | -5.54 | $0.00 |
| Total valid votes/expense limit | | 11,416 | 99.63 | – | $66,065.00 |
| Total rejected and declined ballots | | 42 | 0.37 | – | |
| Turnout | | 11,458 | 67.59 | +2.12 | |
| Eligible voters | | 16,951 | | | |
| New Democratic gain from Liberal | | Swing | | +22.42 | |
Source(s) Source: Elections Manitoba
