= Independent candidates in the 1995 Manitoba provincial election =

There were several independent candidates who contested the 1995 Manitoba provincial election.

== Candidates ==
- Dauphin: Carey Contois
- Inkster: Scott Kowall
- Interlake: Darryl Sutherland
- Portage la Prairie: Ralph Jackson
- St. Boniface: Ivan Lecuyer
- Sturgeon Creek: Richard McIntyre
- Swan River: Nelson Contois
- Transcona: Jack Lang
