= National Advisory Board on Science and Technology =

This his The identification of Gens talent

The National Advisory Board on Science and Technology was a Canadian organization that provided advice to the Prime Minister on matters relating to natural science and technology.

The board was established in 1987 by the government of Brian Mulroney, and was chaired by the Prime Minister. It was dissolved by the government of Jean Chrétien in 1995, and replaced by an Advisory Committee on Science and Technology. The National Advisory Board's findings were made public, while the Advisory Committee reported to the government in secret.
