= Ginny Hasselfield =

Canadian politician

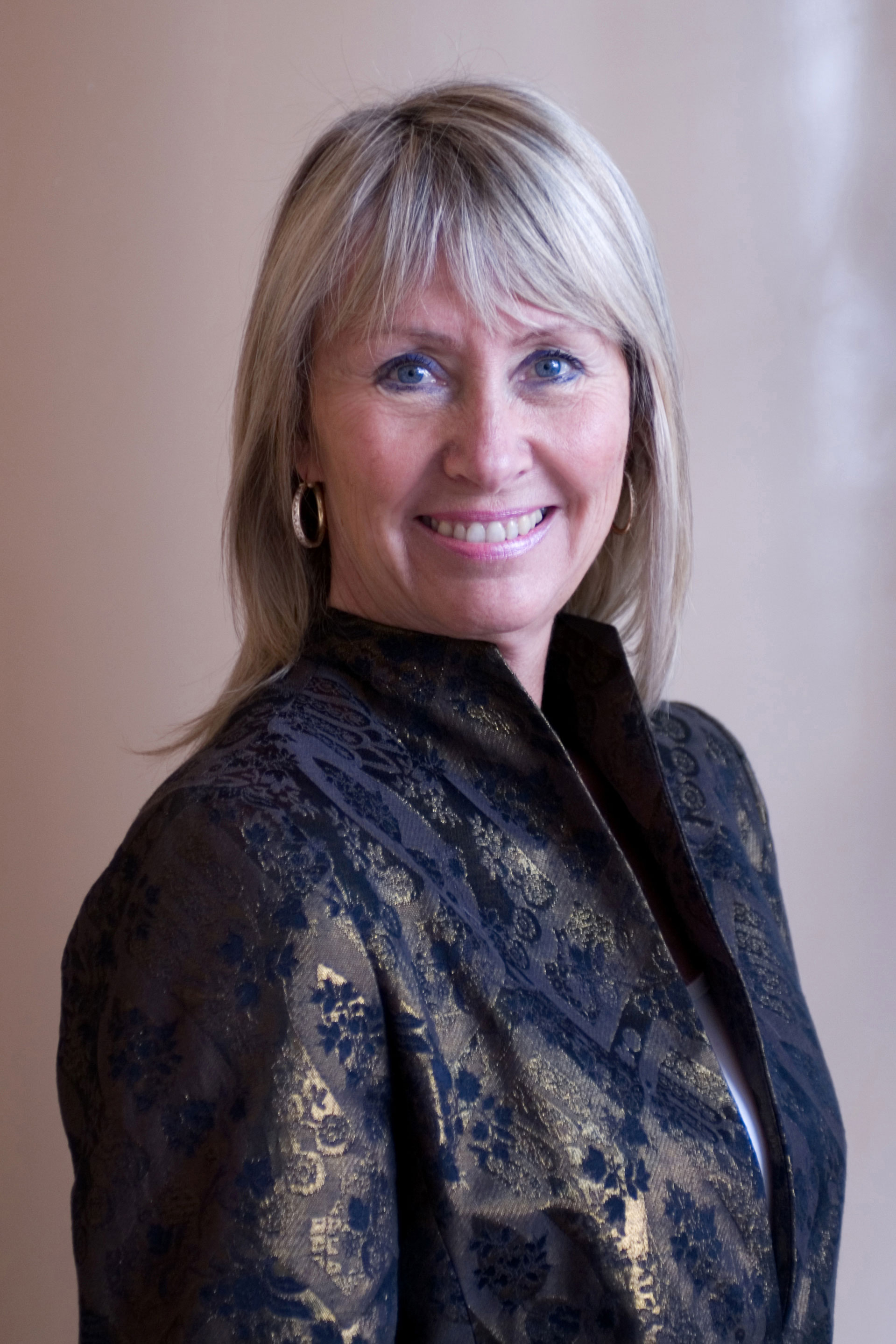

Leader of the Manitoba Liberal Party
- In office October 19, 1996 – 1998
- Preceded by: Paul Edwards
- Succeeded by: Jon Gerrard

Ginny Hasselfield is a Canadian politician, and was the leader of the Manitoba Liberal Party between 1996 and 1998. A former Manitoba teacher and principal, she was also president and co-founder of Cross Cultural Communications International Inc. a company that provided diversity training and education throughout Canada. In 1995, she was awarded the Manitoba YM/YWCA Woman of Distinction award.

Although Hasselfield had never run for provincial office, she was known in Manitoba as a prominent organizer for the Liberal Party and was supported by the party's establishment against Kevin Lamoureux, a maverick MLA from north-end Winnipeg.

Hasselfield and Lamoureux had a very poor personal relationship during the 1996 leadership contest. The voting was determined by a "weighted" balloting process (i.e. every party member could vote in his/her home constituency, and the votes from each constituency were averaged out to provide an equal number of "points" for the total). Lamoureux received more membership votes, but the concentration of his support in north Winnipeg meant that Hasselfield was able to attain a 21-point victory.

After the federal election of 1997, Lamoureux and Gary Kowalski left the Liberal caucus to sit as "Independent Liberals" (this left Neil Gaudry as the only official Liberal MLA in the Manitoba legislature). With the party's internal organization crumbing, Hasselfield was persuaded to stand down as party leader on February 4, 1998. While she never stood for election to the legislature, she was leader during one by-election in Portage la Prairie.

Hasselfield later moved to British Columbia, and continued her active involvement in the Liberal Party of Canada. Her roles included chairing the Federal Liberal President's Council of British Columbia and co-chair of the Liberal Laurier Club. In 2006, she was appointed a Director of the Fraser River Port Authority and was involved in developing plans that eventually amalgamated the Port of Vancouver with the North and South Fraser ports. She is currently on the Board of the South Coast British Columbia Transit Police Authority.
