= Paul Edwards (politician) =

Canadian politician

Leader of the Manitoba Liberal Party
- In office June 4, 1993 – November 19, 1996
- Preceded by: Sharon Carstairs
- Succeeded by: Ginny Hasselfield

Leader of the Second Opposition in the Legislative Assembly of Manitoba
- In office June 4, 1993 – March 20, 1995
- Preceded by: Sharon Carstairs
- Succeeded by: Dougald Lamont (2018–2019)

Member of the Legislative Assembly of Manitoba for St. James
- In office April 26, 1988 – April 25, 1995
- Preceded by: Al Mackling
- Succeeded by: MaryAnn Mihychuk

Personal details
- Born: February 21, 1961 (age 65) Kingston, Ontario, Canada
- Party: Manitoba Liberal Party
- Spouse: Anne MacKay
- Children: 4
- Education: Trent University Queen's University

Paul Edwards (born February 21, 1961) is a Manitoba politician and lawyer. He served as leader of the Manitoba Liberal Party from 1993 to 1996.

Edwards was born in Kingston, Ontario and was educated at Trent University and Queen's University. He later worked as a barrister and solicitor.

In the 1988 Manitoba general election, Edwards was elected to the Legislative Assembly of Manitoba for the Winnipeg riding of St. James, defeating his closest competitor, Progressive Conservative Jae Eadie, by 579 votes. He joined 19 other Liberals in forming the official opposition to the PC minority government led by Premier Gary Filmon.

The 1988 election was a landmark for the Manitoba Liberal Party, in that it had previously been reduced to a marginal presence in the province. The unpopularity of Howard Pawley's New Democratic government in 1988 had given the party the support of many centre-left voters, and many believed that the Liberals had a chance to form government in the next election. This did not occur. The New Democratic Party recovered under Gary Doer's leadership, and the Liberals were reduced to only seven seats (out of 57) in the election of 1990. Edwards was re-elected in St. James, this time defeating PC candidate Joanne Thibault by 295 votes.

Liberal leader Sharon Carstairs was blamed by many in the party for squandering a chance to form government, and resigned as party leader in 1993. Subsequently, Edwards defeated MLA Kevin Lamoureux to become the party's new leader.

The Liberals initially appeared to have a reasonable chance of winning the 1995 election, placing a strong second to the Tories in early polls. They ran a poor campaign, however, and the NDP overtook them well before election day. The Liberals fell to three seats in the election of 1995: Lamoureux was re-elected in his constituency of Inkster, as were Neil Gaudry in St. Boniface and Gary Kowalski in The Maples. In another close race in St. James, Edwards lost to NDP challenger MaryAnn Mihychuk by 166 votes. He announced his resignation as party leader later in 1995. He formally resigned in 1996, and subsequently returned to a legal practice.

Edwards is married to Anne MacKay. They have four children: Beth, Evan, Wynn and Adam.

== Election results ==
1988 Manitoba general election: St. James
Party	Candidate	Votes	%	±%
Liberal	Paul Edwards	3,939	40.14	
Progressive Conservative	Jae Eadie	3,360	34.24	
New Democratic	Allan MacDonald	2,171	22.13	
Confederation of Regions	Fred Debrecen	137	1.40	
Progressive	Charles Lamont	74	0.75	
Libertarian	Dennis Rice	69	0.70	
Western Independence	Merle Hartlin	62	0.63	
Total valid votes		9,812	100.00	
Rejected ballots		29	–	
Turnout		9,841	78.54	
Eligible voters		12,530		
Source: Elections Manitoba

1990 Manitoba general election: St. James
Party	Candidate	Votes	%	±%
Liberal	Paul Edwards	3,014	35.09	-5.05
Progressive Conservative	Joanne Thibault	2,719	31.66	-2.58
New Democratic	Len Sawatsky	2,586	30.11	+7.98
Progressive	Charles Lamont	148	1.72	+0.97
Confederation of Regions	Fred Debrecen	122	1.42	-0.02
Total valid votes		8,589	100.00	-
Rejected ballots		22	–	–
Turnout		8,611	73.37	
Eligible voters		11,737		
Source: Elections Manitoba

1995 Manitoba general election: St. James
Party	Candidate	Votes	%	±%
New Democratic	MaryAnn Mihychuk	3,019	35.63%	5.52%
Liberal	Paul Edwards	2,853	33.67%	-1.42%
Progressive Conservative	Clifford Allbutt	2,601	30.70%	-0.96%
Total valid votes		8,473	–	–
Rejected		48	–	
Eligible voters / Turnout		11,895	71.23%	-1.95%
Source(s) Source: Manitoba. Chief Electoral Officer (1999). Statement of Votes for the 37th Provincial General Election, September 21, 2089 (PDF) (Report). Winnipeg: Elections Manitoba.
