= 1995 Manitoba general election =

← 1990	April 25, 1995	1999 →

57 seats of the Legislative Assembly of Manitoba 29 seats were needed for a majority
- Turnout: 69.20%
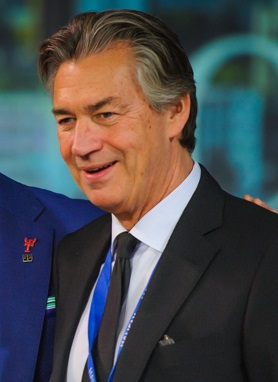
	First party	Second party	Third party
	PC		LIB
Leader	Gary Filmon	Gary Doer	Paul Edwards
Party	Progressive Conservative	New Democratic	Liberal
Leader since	December 10, 1983	March 30, 1988	June 5, 1993
Leader's seat	Tuxedo	Concordia	St. James (lost re-election)
Last election	30	20	7
Seats won	31	23	3
Seat change	▲1	▲3	▼4
Popular vote	216,246	165,489	119,677
Percentage	42.87%	32.81%	23.72%
Swing	▲0.88%	▲4.01%	▼4.42%
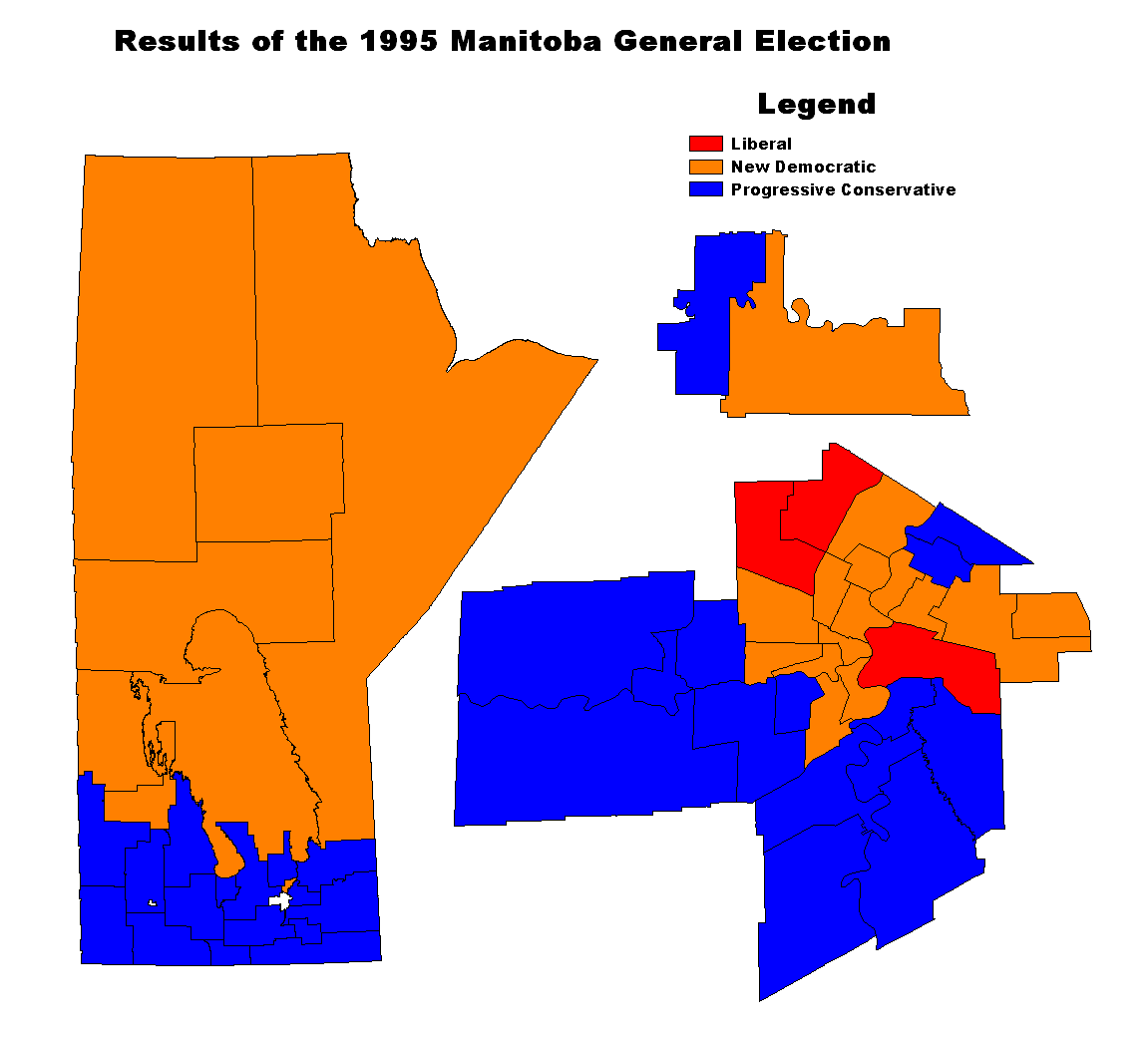
- Map of Election Results
Premier before election
Gary Filmon
Progressive Conservative
Premier after election
Gary Filmon
Progressive Conservative

The 1995 Manitoba general election was held on April 25, 1995 to elect Members of the Legislative Assembly of the Province of Manitoba, Canada. Progressive Conservative Party, which won 31 seats out of 57, clinched the elections. The New Democratic Party formed the official opposition with 23 seats; the Liberal Party won 3.

== Opinion polls ==
Evolution of voting intentions at provincial level
Polling firm	Last day of survey	Source	PC	NDP	MLP	Other	ME	Sample
Election 1995	April 25, 1995		42.87	32.81	23.72	0.6		
Angus Reid	April 16, 1995		40	33	27	—	—	914
Angus Reid	March 17, 1995		37	21	35	—	—	1,200
	February 1995		32	25	35	—	—	800
	January 1995		39	31	31	—	—	600
COMPAS	December 1994		38	19	37	—	—	—
COMPAS	June 1994		28	23	44	4	—	—
Election 1990	September 11, 1990		41.99	28.80	28.15	1.06		

== Results ==
Party	Party Leader	# of candidates	Seats			Popular Vote		
Party	Party Leader	# of candidates	Before^{1}	Elected	% Change	#	%	% Change
Progressive Conservative	Gary Filmon	57	29	31	+6.9%	216,246	42.87	+0.88
New Democratic	Gary Doer	57	20	23	+15.0%	165,489	32.81	+4.01
Liberal	Paul Edwards	57	6	3	-50.0%	119 677	23.72	-4.42
Libertarian	Dennis Rice	6	-	-	-	634	0.13	0.00
Independents		11	-	-	-	2,396	0.47	0.00
First Peoples Party	Jerry Fontaine	[3]		-		[908]		
Independent Native Voice	Nelson Contois	[3]		-		[518]		
Vacant			2	n.a.				
Total		188	57	57	-	504 442	100%	

^{1} "Before" refers to standings in the Legislature at dissolution, and not to the results of the previous election. These numbers therefore reflect changes in party standings as a result of by-elections and members crossing the floor.

=== Vote and seat summaries ===
Ternary plots – shift of electoral support (1990–1995)
1990

1995
Electoral districts identified by colours of winning parties

Popular vote
PC	42.87%
New Democratic	32.81%
Liberal	23.72%
Others	0.60%

Seats summary
PC	54.39%
New Democratic	40.35%
Liberal	5.26%

=== Synopsis of results ===
1995 Manitoba general election – synopsis of riding results
Electoral division	Winning party							Votes					
Electoral division	1990	1st place	Votes	Share	Margin #	Margin %	2nd place	PC	NDP	Lib	Ind	Ltn	Total
Arthur-Virden	PC	PC	5,015	64.36%	3,496	44.87%	NDP	5,015	1,519	1,258	–	–	7,792
Assiniboia	PC	PC	4,315	52.96%	2,130	26.14%	Lib	4,315	1,648	2,185	–	–	8,148
Brandon East	NDP	NDP	4,395	53.78%	1,787	21.87%	PC	2,608	4,395	1,169	–	–	8,172
Brandon West	PC	PC	4,471	49.40%	1,681	18.57%	NDP	4,471	2,790	1,789	–	–	9,050
Broadway	NDP	NDP	3,126	47.87%	1,513	23.17%	Lib	1,529	3,126	1,613	262	–	6,530
Burrows	NDP	NDP	4,748	67.46%	3,482	49.47%	PC	1,266	4,748	1,024	–	–	7,038
Charleswood	PC	PC	5,737	58.00%	2,779	28.09%	Lib	5,737	1,197	2,958	–	–	9,892
Concordia	NDP	NDP	4,827	63.58%	2,982	39.28%	PC	1,845	4,827	816	–	104	7,592
Crescentwood	Liberal	NDP	3,733	36.04%	278	2.68%	PC	3,455	3,733	3,170	–	–	10,358
Dauphin	NDP	NDP	4,673	48.37%	793	8.21%	PC	3,880	4,673	996	111	–	9,660
Elmwood	NDP	NDP	4,264	53.02%	1,712	21.29%	PC	2,552	4,264	1,227	–	–	8,043
Emerson	PC	PC	4,965	62.90%	2,982	37.78%	Lib	4,965	945	1,983	–	–	7,893
Flin Flon	NDP	NDP	2,732	52.05%	715	13.62%	PC	2,017	2,732	500	–	–	5,249
Fort Garry	PC	PC	5,959	48.29%	1,525	12.36%	Lib	5,959	1,857	4,434	–	91	12,341
Gimli	PC	PC	5,591	50.65%	1,845	16.71%	NDP	5,591	3,746	1,702	–	–	11,039
Gladstone	PC	PC	4,629	62.30%	3,175	42.73%	Lib	4,629	1,347	1,454	–	–	7,430
Inkster	Liberal	Liberal	4,394	50.80%	1,745	20.17%	NDP	1,384	2,649	4,394	223	–	8,650
Interlake	NDP	NDP	3,791	51.17%	1,229	16.59%	PC	2,562	3,791	766	289	–	7,408
Kildonan	NDP	NDP	5,812	52.00%	2,488	22.26%	PC	3,324	5,812	2,041	–	–	11,177
Kirkfield Park	PC	PC	5,949	60.15%	3,333	33.70%	Lib	5,949	1,325	2,616	–	–	9,890
La Vérendrye	PC	PC	4,581	48.02%	2,074	21.74%	Lib	4,581	2,452	2,507	–	–	9,540
Lac du Bonnet	PC	PC	5,986	57.07%	2,523	24.06%	NDP	5,986	3,463	1,039	–	–	10,488
Lakeside	PC	PC	4,376	57.12%	2,574	33.60%	NDP	4,376	1,802	1,373	–	110	7,661
Minnedosa	PC	PC	4,498	54.58%	2,457	29.81%	NDP	4,498	2,041	1,702	–	–	8,241
Morris	PC	PC	5,662	60.99%	3,333	35.90%	Lib	5,662	1,158	2,329	–	135	9,284
Niakwa	PC	PC	5,908	50.86%	2,160	18.59%	Lib	5,908	1,961	3,748	–	–	11,617
Osborne	Liberal	NDP	3,969	40.86%	991	10.20%	Lib	2,766	3,969	2,978	–	–	9,713
Pembina	PC	PC	5,092	62.28%	2,460	30.09%	Lib	5,092	452	2,632	–	–	8,176
Point Douglas	NDP	NDP	3,095	63.03%	1,963	39.98%	Lib	578	3,095	1,132	105	–	4,910
Portage la Prairie	PC	PC	3,977	51.36%	1,860	24.02%	Lib	3,977	1,519	2,117	130	–	7,743
Radisson	NDP	NDP	4,891	52.04%	2,490	26.49%	Lib	2,107	4,891	2,401	–	–	9,399
Riel	PC	PC	3,561	38.15%	441	4.72%	Lib	3,561	2,653	3,120	–	–	9,334
River East	PC	PC	4,938	47.20%	1,762	16.84%	NDP	4,938	3,176	2,347	–	–	10,461
River Heights	Liberal	PC	5,429	47.98%	994	8.79%	Lib	5,429	1,352	4,435	–	98	11,314
Roblin-Russell	PC	PC	4,672	54.33%	1,984	23.07%	NDP	4,672	2,688	1,239	–	–	8,599
Rossmere	PC	PC	4,318	45.97%	117	1.25%	NDP	4,318	4,201	875	–	–	9,394
Rupertsland	NDP	NDP	2,249	50.80%	1,231	27.81%	Lib	619	2,249	1,018	541	–	4,427
Seine River	PC	PC	6,462	49.70%	2,086	16.04%	Lib	6,462	2,163	4,376	–	–	13,001
Selkirk	NDP	NDP	4,758	43.77%	919	8.45%	PC	3,839	4,758	2,273	–	–	10,870
Springfield	PC	PC	6,355	52.15%	2,080	17.07%	NDP	6,355	4,275	1,461	–	96	12,187
St. Boniface	Liberal	Liberal	4,021	45.48%	1,192	13.48%	NDP	1,686	2,829	4,021	306	–	8,842
St. James	Liberal	NDP	3,019	35.63%	166	1.96%	Lib	2,601	3,019	2,853	–	–	8,473
St. Johns	NDP	NDP	4,513	58.53%	2,903	37.65%	Lib	1,587	4,513	1,610	–	–	7,710
St. Norbert	PC	PC	4,699	43.90%	527	4.92%	Lib	4,699	1,833	4,172	–	–	10,704
St. Vital	PC	PC	4,021	41.47%	664	6.85%	NDP	4,021	3,357	2,319	–	–	9,697
Ste. Rose	PC	PC	3,762	51.99%	1,421	19.64%	NDP	3,762	2,341	1,133	–	–	7,236
Steinbach	PC	PC	5,975	74.99%	4,769	59.85%	Lib	5,975	787	1,206	–	–	7,968
Sturgeon Creek	PC	PC	4,747	49.11%	1,696	17.55%	Lib	4,747	1,688	3,051	180	–	9,666
Swan River	NDP	NDP	4,021	46.31%	36	0.41%	PC	3,985	4,021	559	118	–	8,683
The Maples	Liberal	Liberal	4,254	48.08%	1,620	18.31%	NDP	1,960	2,634	4,254	–	–	8,848
The Pas	NDP	NDP	3,616	51.70%	1,115	15.94%	PC	2,501	3,616	877	–	–	6,994
Thompson	NDP	NDP	3,619	61.71%	2,299	39.20%	PC	1,320	3,619	926	–	–	5,865
Transcona	NDP	NDP	5,163	58.13%	2,791	31.42%	PC	2,372	5,163	1,216	131	–	8,882
Turtle Mountain	PC	PC	4,781	60.90%	3,046	38.80%	Lib	4,781	1,334	1,735	–	–	7,850
Tuxedo	PC	PC	8,691	66.23%	5,716	43.56%	Lib	8,691	1,457	2,975	–	–	13,123
Wellington	NDP	NDP	3,788	54.04%	1,792	25.56%	Lib	1,226	3,788	1,996	–	–	7,010
Wolseley	NDP	NDP	4,048	56.38%	2,471	34.42%	Lib	1,555	4,048	1,577	–	–	7,180

= open seat
= winning candidate was in previous Legislature
= incumbent had switched allegiance
= previously incumbent in another riding
= incumbency arose from a byelection gain
= not incumbent; was previously elected to the Legislature
= other incumbents renominated
= candidate for First Peoples Party or Independent Native Voice - parties not recognized by Elections Manitoba
= multiple candidates

=== Turnout, winning shares and swings ===
Summary of riding results by turnout, vote share for winning candidate, and swing (vs 1990)
Riding and winning party			Turnout		Vote share (Note: Share won by winning candidate, with difference noted from share achieved by the same party in 1986.)		Swing (Note: Positive indicates improvement to standing of party winning in 1986; negative points to 1986's second-place party being swung to.)	
Riding and winning party			%	Change (pp)	%	Change (pp)	To	Change (pp)
Arthur-Virden	PC	Hold	64.94	-0.07	64.36	5.11	PC	7.42
Assiniboia	PC	Hold	70.77	0.94	52.96	3.11	PC	4.93
Brandon East	NDP	Hold	62.88	-4.64	53.78	0.27	NDP	2.25
Brandon West	PC	Hold	67.75	-1.94	49.40	-6.07	NDP	-4.54
Broadway	NDP	Hold	60.70	-0.89	47.87	9.16	NDP	10.75
Burrows	NDP	Hold	63.90	-2.96	67.46	13.12	NDP	12.57
Charleswood	PC	Hold	74.68	0.03	58.00	0.44	PC	0.73
Concordia	NDP	Hold	66.82	-1.56	63.58	5.41	NDP	2.83
Crescentwood	NDP	Gain	73.34	1.58	36.04	14.31	PC	-7.89
Dauphin	NDP	Hold	77.82	1.14	48.37	-0.46	PC	-2.90
Elmwood	NDP	Hold	68.85	-2.79	53.02	6.04	NDP	4.43
Emerson	PC	Hold	66.21	4.62	62.90	1.06	Lib	-0.16
Flin Flon	NDP	Hold	57.08	-5.43	52.05	-17.03	PC	-18.36
Fort Garry	PC	Hold	71.16	-1.80	48.29	1.22	PC	1.05
Gimli	PC	Hold	75.07	3.08	50.65	-1.78	NDP	-4.20
Gladstone	PC	Hold	61.47	1.05	62.30	3.09	PC	4.03
Inkster	Lib	Hold	67.03	2.75	50.80	4.93	Lib	3.94
Interlake	NDP	Hold	64.09	1.21	51.17	10.64	NDP	5.48
Kildonan	NDP	Hold	74.29	-0.86	52.00	16.31	NDP	10.17
Kirkfield Park	PC	Hold	75.16	-2.26	60.15	3.73	PC	5.29
La Vérendrye	PC	Hold	69.71	3.03	48.02	3.53	PC	4.83
Lac du Bonnet	PC	Hold	75.99	2.93	57.07	3.38	PC	1.52
Lakeside	PC	Hold	64.75	1.44	57.12	7.43	PC	7.69
Minnedosa	PC	Hold	64.62	0.19	54.58	1.58	PC	4.06
Morris	PC	Hold	71.05	5.27	60.99	-2.65	Lib	-1.77
Niakwa	PC	Hold	77.32	-0.18	50.86	4.36	PC	6.25
Osborne	NDP	Gain	70.17	-1.47	40.86	11.67	NDP	-10.61
Pembina	PC	Hold	61.78	3.45	62.28	-16.45	Lib	-18.36
Point Douglas	NDP	Hold	58.23	-2.70	63.03	8.32	NDP	7.90
Portage la Prairie	PC	Hold	65.84	0.02	51.36	-2.49	Lib	-0.25
Radisson	NDP	Hold	66.61	-1.26	52.04	5.28	NDP	6.95
Riel	PC	Hold	75.65	4.64	38.15	-5.17	Lib	-2.72
River East	PC	Hold	77.28	3.35	47.20	-5.53	NDP	-4.72
River Heights	PC	Gain	81.66	0.20	47.98	7.61	PC	-8.19
Roblin-Russell	PC	Hold	69.67	4.70	54.33	2.02	NDP	-1.26
Rossmere	PC	Hold	77.08	2.62	45.97	3.64	NDP	-5.73
Rupertsland	NDP	Hold	44.83	-1.77	50.80	-26.57	PC	-12.09
Seine River	PC	Hold	74.53	1.64	49.70	8.98	PC	7.81
Selkirk	NDP	Hold	77.25	2.81	43.77	7.19	NDP	2.91
Springfield	PC	Hold	77.41	4.01	52.15	3.03	PC	0.08
St. Boniface	Lib	Hold	71.30	1.22	45.48	-9.93	NDP	-9.46
St. James	NDP	Gain	71.64	-1.73	35.63	5.52	PC	-0.23
St. Johns	NDP	Hold	67.48	-1.70	58.53	5.67	NDP	6.92
St. Norbert	PC	Hold	71.87	-1.66	43.90	-1.58	PC	1.87
St. Vital	PC	Hold	74.70	1.70	41.47	5.17	PC	8.14
Ste. Rose	PC	Hold	62.96	1.36	51.99	0.41	PC	5.69
Steinbach	PC	Hold	58.53	0.83	74.99	-0.65	PC	0.10
Sturgeon Creek	PC	Hold	70.71	-3.52	49.11	2.60	PC	4.95
Swan River	NDP	Hold	74.93	1.64	46.31	0.62	PC	-1.17
The Maples	Lib	Hold	66.38	-0.62	48.08	8.25	Lib	9.38
The Pas	NDP	Hold	58.24	-7.53	51.70	7.34	NDP	7.04
Thompson	NDP	Hold	54.87	-8.18	61.71	1.78	NDP	4.57
Transcona	NDP	Hold	68.47	-1.76	58.13	8.64	NDP	11.96
Turtle Mountain	PC	Hold	66.79	0.09	60.90	2.22	PC	3.11
Tuxedo	PC	Hold	73.10	-2.39	66.23	1.09	PC	2.80
Wellington	NDP	Hold	66.97	-1.27	54.04	8.03	NDP	5.12
Wolseley	NDP	Hold	67.72	-2.50	56.38	12.48	NDP	12.20

=== Changes in party shares ===
Share change analysis by party and riding (1995 vs 1990)
Riding	Liberal		NDP		PC	
Riding	%	Change (pp)	%	Change (pp)	%	Change (pp)
Arthur-Virden	16.14	-9.74	19.49	4.63	64.36	5.11
Assiniboia	26.82	-6.75	20.23	3.65	52.96	3.11
Brandon East	14.30	3.97	53.78	0.27	31.91	-4.24
Brandon West	19.77	3.04	30.83	3.02	49.40	-6.07
Broadway	24.70	-12.35	47.87	9.16	23.42	-0.82
Burrows	14.55	-12.01	67.46	13.12	17.99	-1.11
Charleswood	29.90	-1.03	12.10	0.59	58.00	0.44
Concordia	10.75	-2.68	63.58	5.41	24.30	-0.26
Crescentwood	30.60	-15.05	36.04	14.31	33.36	0.74
Dauphin	10.31	-6.04	48.37	-0.46	40.17	5.35
Elmwood	15.26	-3.22	53.02	6.04	31.73	-2.82
Emerson	25.12	1.38	11.97	-2.43	62.90	1.06
Flin Flon	9.53	-2.67	52.05	-17.03	38.43	19.70
Fort Garry	35.93	-0.88	15.05	1.22	48.29	1.22
Gimli	15.42	-4.84	33.93	6.62	50.65	-1.78
Gladstone	19.57	-4.98	18.13	7.45	62.30	3.09
Inkster	50.80	4.93	30.62	-2.96	16.00	-2.03
Interlake	10.34	-14.21	51.17	10.64	34.58	-0.33
Kildonan	18.26	-7.07	52.00	16.31	29.74	-4.03
Kirkfield Park	26.45	-6.84	13.40	3.35	60.15	3.73
La Vérendrye	26.28	-6.13	25.70	2.60	48.02	3.53
Lac du Bonnet	9.91	-3.71	33.02	0.33	57.07	3.38
Lakeside	17.92	-7.95	23.52	6.85	57.12	7.43
Minnedosa	20.65	-6.54	24.77	4.96	54.58	1.58
Morris	25.09	0.88	12.47	3.90	60.99	-2.65
Niakwa	32.26	-8.14	16.88	3.79	50.86	4.36
Osborne	30.66	-9.55	40.86	11.67	28.48	-0.70
Pembina	32.19	20.26	5.53	-3.81	62.28	-16.45
Point Douglas	23.05	-7.47	63.03	8.32	11.77	0.45
Portage la Prairie	27.34	-1.99	19.62	5.86	51.36	-2.49
Radisson	25.55	3.35	52.04	5.28	22.42	-8.63
Riel	33.43	0.28	28.42	4.88	38.15	-5.17
River East	22.44	1.61	30.36	3.92	47.20	-5.53
River Heights	39.20	-8.77	11.95	1.51	47.98	7.61
Roblin-Russell	14.41	-6.57	31.26	4.54	54.33	2.02
Rossmere	9.31	-16.95	44.72	15.09	45.97	3.64
Rupertsland	23.00	16.74	50.80	-26.57	13.98	-2.40
Seine River	33.66	-6.64	16.64	0.29	49.70	8.98
Selkirk	20.91	-8.56	43.77	7.19	35.32	1.36
Springfield	11.99	-6.70	35.08	2.88	52.15	3.03
St. Boniface	45.48	-9.93	32.00	8.99	19.07	-2.53
St. James	33.67	-1.42	35.63	5.52	30.70	-0.96
St. Johns	20.88	-8.17	58.53	5.67	20.58	2.50
St. Norbert	38.98	-5.33	17.12	6.91	43.90	-1.58
St. Vital	23.91	-11.11	34.62	9.05	41.47	5.17
Ste. Rose	15.66	-10.97	32.35	10.56	51.99	0.41
Steinbach	15.14	-0.85	9.88	3.28	74.99	-0.65
Sturgeon Creek	31.56	-7.30	17.46	2.83	49.11	2.60
Swan River	6.44	-4.93	46.31	0.62	45.89	2.95
The Maples	48.08	8.25	29.77	2.27	22.15	-10.51
The Pas	12.54	-0.61	51.70	7.34	35.76	-6.73
Thompson	15.79	5.58	61.71	1.78	22.51	-7.36
Transcona	13.69	-15.28	58.13	8.64	26.71	7.06
Turtle Mountain	22.10	-3.99	16.99	3.93	60.90	2.22
Tuxedo	22.67	-4.52	11.10	3.43	66.23	1.09
Wellington	28.47	-2.21	54.04	8.03	17.49	-2.77
Wolseley	21.96	-11.92	56.38	12.48	21.66	1.45

== Post-election changes ==
Electoral district	Candidates				Incumbent
Electoral district	PC	NDP	Liberal	Other	Incumbent
Portage la Prairie; September 30, 1997	David Faurschou; 2,422	Connie Gretsinger; 1,340	Dave Quinn; 1,657	Warren Goodwin (Ind); 1,025; Ralph Jackson (Ind); 49	Brian Pallister
Charleswood; April 28, 1998	Myrna Driedger; 2,767	Barrie Farrow; 961	Alan McKenzie; 1,524		Jim Ernst

Gary Kowalski left the Liberal caucus on June 5, 1997, and Kevin Lamoureux followed suit on October 1, 1997. Both rejoined the party caucus in 1998.

Neil Gaudry died on February 18, 1999.

== See also ==
- List of Manitoba political parties
- Independent candidates, 1995 Manitoba provincial election
