= Gary Kowalski (politician) =

Canadian politician

Gary Anthony Kowalski (born August 9, 1952) is a former politician in Manitoba, Canada. He was a member of the Manitoba legislature from 1993 to 1999, sitting for most of that time as a Liberal.

The son of Tony Kowalski and Olga Kolczycki, he was born in Winnipeg and worked as a police officer in the Winnipeg Police Department before entering public life, serving from 1974 to 1993. He received a Canada 125th Medal in 1992, and was elected as a trustee on the Seven Oaks School Division in September of the same year.

In 1976, he married Ellen Joy Michie.

When Gulzar Cheema resigned as an MLA in 1993, Kowalski sought and won the Liberal nomination in the Winnipeg riding of The Maples to succeed him. He won the resulting by-election on September 21, defeating New Democrat Norma Walker by about 1,500 votes.

The Liberals were reduced to only three seats in the provincial election of 1995, although Kowalski was able to retain The Maples by a significant margin.

The provincial Liberals went through a period of internal division in 1997. Kowalski disapproved of the leadership of Ginny Hasselfield, and left the party to sit as an Independent Liberal on June 5, 1997. He was joined by former leadership candidate Kevin Lamoureux shortly thereafter, leaving Neil Gaudry as the only official Liberal MLA in the province. Kowalski initially considered joining the NDP caucus, but declined. Both Kowalski and Lamoureux were re-integrated into the party's caucus following Hasselfield's resignation in 1998.

Despite (or perhaps because of) his background as a police officer, Kowalski was a vocal supporter of gun control during his time in the legislature. In 1995, Kowalski supported mandatory supervision of sex offenders who had served their sentences, before such individuals were released to the community.

Early in 1999, Kowalski refused to give unanimous consent for the legislature to discuss a motion addressing the farming crisis in southwestern Manitoba. He claimed he was acting on orders from Jon Gerrard (who had replaced Hasselfield as leader), and did not appear to be comfortable with his actions. Kowalski did not seek re-election in 1999, and has not participated in public life since that time. He stated that he intended to return to active duty with the City of Winnipeg Police Services. Kowalski retired from the Winnipeg police force in March 2004 with 31 years of service and subsequently joined the Royal Canadian Mounted Police.
