= River Heights (electoral district) =

Provincial electoral district in Manitoba, Canada

Coordinates: 49.859°N 97.175°W

Manitoba electoral district
- Location in Winnipeg

Provincial electoral district
- Legislature: Legislative Assembly of Manitoba
MLA
Mike Moroz
New Democratic
- District created: 1957
- First contested: 1958
- Last contested: 2023

River Heights is a provincial electoral district of Manitoba, Canada. It was created by redistribution in 1957, and formally came into existence in the 1958 provincial election. The riding is located in the south-central region of the city of Winnipeg.

River Heights is bordered to the east by Fort Rouge (formerly Lord Roberts), to the southeast by Fort Garry, to the south by Fort Whyte, to the north by Wolseley (across the Assiniboine River), and to the west by Tuxedo.

From 1958 to 1986, River Heights was represented by members of the Progressive Conservative Party. Since that time, however, it has generally been represented by leaders of the provincial Liberal Party. Sharon Carstairs represented the riding from 1986 until her appointment to the Senate of Canada in 1994, and Jon Gerrard represented the riding from 1999 until 2023 when he lost the seat to NDP candidate Mike Moroz. Moroz is the first New Democrat ever to represent the constituency.

== Statistical overview ==
The riding's population in 1996 was 19,950. The riding's character is middle- and upper-middle class. In 1999, the average family income was $77,701, and the unemployment rate was 5.90%. River Heights includes many of Winnipeg's oldest and stateliest homes: the average value of dwelling house in the riding in 1999 was $117,937.

River Heights has a significant Jewish population, at 9% of the total. The highest percentage of people in Manitoba at the riding level have university degrees, at 38.5%. Voter turnout also tends to be extremely high in this riding; in its first four decades, turnout usually exceeded 80% of the eligible population.

The service sector accounts for 15% of industry in River Heights, with educational services following at 14%.

== Members of the Legislative Assembly ==
Assembly	Years	Member	Party
25th	1958–1959	W.B. Scarth	Progressive Conservative
26th	1959–1962	W.B. Scarth	Progressive Conservative
27th	1962–1966	Maitland Steinkopf	Progressive Conservative
28th	1966–1969	Sidney Spivak	Progressive Conservative
29th	1969–1973	Sidney Spivak	Progressive Conservative
30th	1973–1977	Sidney Spivak	Progressive Conservative
31st	1977–1979	Sidney Spivak	Progressive Conservative
31st	1979–1981	Gary Filmon	Progressive Conservative
32nd	1981–1986	Warren Steen	Progressive Conservative
33rd	1986–1988	Sharon Carstairs	Liberal
34th	1988–1990	Sharon Carstairs	Liberal
35th	1990–1994	Sharon Carstairs	Liberal
Riding was vacant from 1994–1995
36th	1995–1999	Mike Radcliffe	Progressive Conservative
37th	1999–2003	Jon Gerrard	Liberal
38th	2003–2007	Jon Gerrard	Liberal
39th	2007–2011	Jon Gerrard	Liberal
40th	2011–2016	Jon Gerrard	Liberal
41st	2016–2019	Jon Gerrard	Liberal
42nd	2019–2023	Jon Gerrard	Liberal
43rd	2023–present	Mike Moroz	New Democratic

== Electoral results ==
2023 Manitoba general election
Party	Candidate	Votes	%	±%	Expenditures
New Democratic	Mike Moroz	5,047	44.21	+29.63	$34,794.42
Liberal	Jon Gerrard	4,404	38.58	-15.22	$15,378.75
Progressive Conservative	Tim Burt	1,807	15.83	-8.87	$15,741.18
Green	Nathan Zahn	158	1.38	-5.54	$0.00
Total valid votes/expense limit		11,416	99.63	–	$66,065.00
Total rejected and declined ballots		42	0.37	–	
Turnout		11,458	67.59	+2.12	
Eligible voters		16,951			
New Democratic gain from Liberal		Swing		+22.42	
Source(s) Source: Elections Manitoba

2019 Manitoba general election
Party	Candidate	Votes	%	±%	Expenditures
Liberal	Jon Gerrard	5,884	53.79	+1.89	$20,360.48
Progressive Conservative	Susan Boulter	2,702	24.70	-9.82	$15,457.28
New Democratic	Jonathan Niemczak	1,595	14.58	+8.72	$2,138.19
Green	Nathan Zahn	757	6.92	-0.73	$0.00
Total valid votes		10,938	99.69		
Total rejected ballots		34	0.31		
Turnout		10,972	65.48		
Eligible voters		16,757			

2016 Manitoba general election
Party	Candidate	Votes	%	±%	Expenditures
Liberal	Jon Gerrard	5,230	51.90	+5.99	$24,782.14
Progressive Conservative	Tracey Maconachie	3,485	34.58	+1.82	$35,477.22
Green	Michael Cardillo	771	7.65	+4.08	$1,180.63
New Democratic	Shafagh Daneshfar	591	5.86	-11.90	$671.90
Total valid votes/expense limit		10,077	100.00	-	$44,532.00
Total rejected ballots		79	–	–	
Turnout		10,156	72.70	–	
Eligible voters		13,969			
Source: Elections Manitoba

2011 Manitoba general election
Party	Candidate	Votes	%	±%	Expenditures
Liberal	Jon Gerrard	4,742	45.91	−5.15	$35,683.03
Progressive Conservative	Marty Morantz	3,384	32.76	+7.65	$37,469.17
New Democratic	Dan Manning	1,835	17.76	−2.01	$10,119.45
Green	Elizabeth May Cameron	370	3.57	−0.48	$498.55
Total valid votes		10,358			
Rejected and declined votes		29			
Turnout		10,387	72.51	+3.17	
Electors on the lists		14,325			
Source: Elections Manitoba

2007 Manitoba general election
Party	Candidate	Votes	%	±%	Expenditures
Liberal	Jon Gerrard	4,760	51.06	+2.36	$24,934.03
Progressive Conservative	Ashley Burner	2,341	25.11	−3.84	$30,166.89
New Democratic	Fiona Shiells	1,843	19.77	+0.03	$3,859.68
Green	Christine Bennet-Clark	378	4.05	+1.79	$861.98
Total valid votes		9,322	100.00		
Rejected and declined votes		22			
Turnout		9,344	69.34	+1.91	
Electors on the lists		13,475			
Source: Elections Manitoba

2003 Manitoba general election
Party	Candidate	Votes	%	±%	Expenditures
Liberal	Jon Gerrard	4,500	48.70	+3.70	$29,690.35
Progressive Conservative	Mike Radcliffe	2,675	28.95	−12.00	$24,419.68
New Democratic	Kristin Bingeman	1,824	19.74	+6.76	$4,053.34
Green	Linda Goossen	209	2.26	+1.46	$49.68
Libertarian	Clancy Smith	32	0.35	+0.08	$0.00
Total valid votes		9,240	100.00		
Rejected and declined votes		31			
Turnout		9,271	67.43	−6.24	
Electors on the lists		13,749			

1999 Manitoba general election
Party	Candidate	Votes	%	±%	Expenditures
Liberal	Jon Gerrard	5,173	45.00	+5.80	$30,877.93
Progressive Conservative	Mike Radcliffe	4,708	40.95	-7.03	$28,010.25
New Democratic	Peter Reimer	1,492	12.98	+1.03	$3,101.00
Green	Chris Billows	92	0.80	n/a	$55.40
Libertarian	Clancy Smith	31	0.27	-0.59	$443.82
Total valid votes		11,496	100.00		
Rejected and declined votes		41			
Turnout		11,537	83.67		
Electors on the lists		13,788			

1990 Manitoba general election
Party	Candidate	Votes	%	±%
Liberal	Sharon Carstairs	5,467	47.97	-11.72
Progressive Conservative	Shaun McCaffrey	4,601	40.37	+9.96
New Democratic	Peter Sim	1,190	10.44	+1.1
Libertarian	Clancy Smith	138	1.21	+0.65
Total valid votes		11,426	100.00	-
Rejected ballots		30	–	
Turnout		11,396	81.46	
Eligible voters		14,026		
Source: Elections Manitoba

1988 Manitoba general election
Party	Candidate	Votes	%	±%
Liberal	Sharon Carstairs	6,620	59.69	+14.71
Progressive Conservative	Bob Vandewater	3,373	30.41	-0.11
New Democratic	Harry Daniels	1,036	9.34	-15.16
Libertarian	Jim Weidman	62	0.56	n/a
Total valid votes		11,108	100.00	-
Rejected ballots		17	–	–
Turnout		11,091	87.07	
Eligible voters		12,757		
Source: Elections Manitoba

1986 Manitoba general election
Party	Candidate	Votes	%	±%
Liberal	Sharon Carstairs	4,620	44.98	+21.57
Progressive Conservative	Warren Steen	3,135	30.52	-14.94
New Democratic	Murray Smith	2,516	24.50	-5.31
Turnout		10,287	80.66	
Liberal gain from Progressive Conservative		Swing		+18.26
Source: Elections Manitoba

== Previous boundaries ==
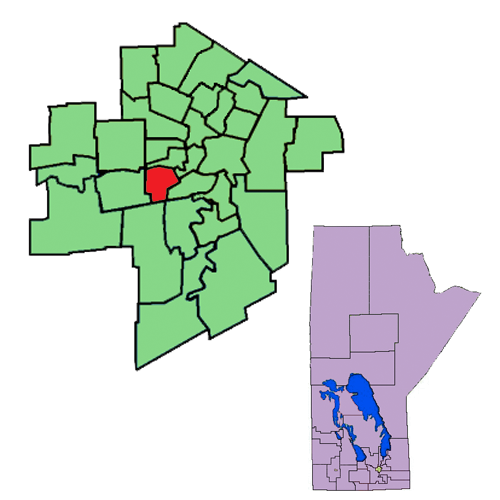
The 1999–2011 boundaries for River Heights highlighted in red.

== See also ==
- List of Manitoba provincial electoral districts
- Canadian provincial electoral districts
