= Glen Findlay =

Canadian politician

Member of the Legislative Assembly of Manitoba for Virden
- In office March 18, 1986 – September 11, 1990
- Preceded by: Harry Graham
- Succeeded by: Riding Abolished

Personal details
- Born: July 15, 1940 (age 86) Shoal Lake, Manitoba
- Education: University of Manitoba University of Illinois

Glen Marshall Findlay (born July 15, 1940) is a politician in Manitoba, Canada. He was a member of the Legislative Assembly of Manitoba from 1986 to 1999, and a cabinet minister in the government of Gary Filmon from 1988 to 1999.

The son of Marshall F. Findlay and Verna B. Cochrane, he was born in Shoal Lake, Manitoba, and was educated at the University of Manitoba and the University of Illinois. He worked as a farmer on his family's 5,000 acre beef farm after returning to the province, and was a professor in the Faculty of Agriculture at the University of Manitoba from 1970 to 1977. He married Katherine E. Kennedy.

Findlay was first elected to the Manitoba legislature in the provincial election of 1986, easily winning the rural riding of Virden as a Progressive Conservative. The election was narrowly won by the New Democratic Party under Howard Pawley, and Findlay joined 25 other Conservatives in the official opposition.

The Pawley government fell in 1988, when disgruntled backbencher Jim Walding voted against his own government. Findlay was re-elected without difficulty in the general election which followed, and was appointed Minister of Agriculture with responsibility for the Manitoba Telephone System on May 9, 1988.

The Virden riding was eliminated by redistribution in the 1990 election and Findlay ran in the riding of Springfield, where he defeated NDP candidate Deborah Barron-McNabb by almost 2,000 votes. He endorsed Jean Charest's bid to lead the Progressive Conservative Party of Canada in June 1993.

On September 10, 1993, he was named Minister of Highways and Transportation, retaining responsibility for the provincial telephone system. He was re-elected in the provincial election of 1995, again defeating his NDP opponent by about 2000 votes. In 1996, Findlay was responsible for coordinating the government's highly controversial decision to sell the MTS.

Findlay left cabinet on February 5, 1999, and did not seek re-election later in the year. In 2000, he was appointed to a federal panel reviewing the Canada Transportation Act. In 2006, he was appointed by the federal government to the board of directors of the Canadian Wheat Board.
