= Doug Lauchlan =

Canadian politician (1931-2016)

Doug Martyn Lauchlan (February 18, 1931 – February 15, 2016) was a Canadian politician, minister and educator. From 1980 to 1982, he was the leader of the Manitoba Liberal Party.

Lauchlan was an ordained minister in the United Church of Canada, and was the President of Mount Royal College in Calgary during the 1970s. He also worked as an advisor to Lloyd Axworthy.

In 1979, Lauchlan was a federal Liberal candidate in the Alberta riding of Calgary West. He was defeated by Progressive Conservative Jim Hawkes.

On November 30, 1980, Lauchlan was elected leader of the Manitoba Liberal Party, defeating Hugh Moran by 493 votes to 300. The Manitoba Liberals were in a precarious position in this period, holding only one seat in the provincial legislature (that of June Westbury, who replaced Axworthy in the by-election).

With the electorate polarized between the Progressive Conservatives and New Democrats, the Liberals were unable to present themselves as a viable alternative. In the general election of 1981, Lauchlan finished a poor third in the riding of Wolseley and the Liberal Party was eliminated from the legislature for the only time in its history. Lauchlan resigned as party leader in 1982.

Lauchlan subsequently returned to Alberta, where he became executive director of the United Way. He then moved on to become the CEO of the Calgary Centre for Performing Arts, currently known as Arts Common, until his retirement ten years later. In 1988, he was recognized by the Canadian Speech Association as Speaker of the Year. He was also a director of the Banff Centre, one of the founding members of the board of the Esther Honens Piano Festival, and the Calgary International Organ Festival.

Lauchlan was married to Margaret for 57 years, until her death in 2011. They had 4 children. Doug Lauchlan died on February 15, 2016, at the age of 84.
