= Kevin Lamoureux =

Canadian politician (born 1962)

The Honourable Kevin Lamoureux PC MP
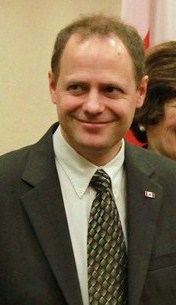

Parliamentary Secretary to the Leader of the Government in the House of Commons
- Incumbent
- Assumed office December 2, 2015
- Leader: Dominic LeBlanc; Bardish Chagger; Pablo Rodriguez; Mark Holland; Karina Gould; Steven MacKinnon
- Preceded by: Tom Lukiwski

Member of Parliament for Winnipeg North
- Incumbent
- Assumed office November 29, 2010
- Preceded by: Judy Wasylycia-Leis

Member of the Legislative Assembly of Manitoba for Inkster
- In office June 23, 2003 – November 1, 2010
- Preceded by: Becky Barrett
- Succeeded by: Riding abolished
- In office April 26, 1988 – September 21, 1999
- Preceded by: Don Scott
- Succeeded by: Becky Barrett

Personal details
- Born: January 22, 1962 (age 64) Winnipeg, Manitoba, Canada
- Party: Liberal
- Other political affiliations: Manitoba Liberal
- Children: 2, including Cindy
- Education: University of Winnipeg

Kevin Lamoureux MP (born January 22, 1962) is a politician in Manitoba, Canada. On November 29, 2010, he was elected to the House of Commons of Canada for the constituency of Winnipeg North in a by-election. He was re-elected during the 2011 election by a margin of just 44 votes and being the only Liberal flip this election. Lamoureux previously served in the Legislative Assembly of Manitoba from 1988 to 1999 and from 2003 to 2010, and he twice sought the leadership of the Manitoba Liberal Party. He serves in the House of Commons as a member of the Liberal Party of Canada.

== Background ==
Lamoureux was born in Winnipeg, Manitoba, and was educated at the University of Winnipeg. He worked as a store manager and air traffic control assistant, also serving in the armed forces for three years. His younger brother, Darrin Lamoureux, was the leader of the Saskatchewan Liberal Party from 2013 to 2017. His daughter, Cindy Lamoureux, is an MLA in northwest Winnipeg; she represented Burrows from 2016 until 2019 and has since represented Tyndall Park.

== Member of the Manitoba Legislature ==
Lamoureux first ran for the Legislative Assembly of Manitoba in the 1986 election in the north-Winnipeg division of Logan. The Liberal Party did not have a strong provincial organization in this campaign, and Lamoureux finished a distant third against New Democrat Maureen Hemphill.

The Manitoba Liberal Party saw its popularity increase between 1986 and 1988, as many centre-left voters abandoned the New Democratic Party (NDP) government of Howard Pawley. In the 1988 election, the Liberals jumped from one seat—River Heights, represented by party leader Sharon Carstairs—to twenty and became the dominant party in both north and south Winnipeg. Lamoureux scored a narrow victory over NDP incumbent Don Scott in the north end division of Inkster and entered the legislature as a member of the Official Opposition.

The Liberal Party fell back to seven seats in the 1990 provincial election, finishing in third place behind a resurgent New Democratic Party. Lamoureux, however, was re-elected in Inkster with an increased margin of victory.

Leadership campaigns

Lamoureux ran for the Manitoba Liberal Party's leadership in 1993 after the resignation of Sharon Carstairs. He was seen as an "anti-establishment" candidate in this contest, representing north-Winnipeg communities against a party establishment dominated by south-Winnipeg interests. He lost to Paul Edwards.

The Liberals were leading in the polls before the 1995 provincial election, but their support base collapsed during the campaign and the party won only three seats. Lamoureux again increased his majority in Inkster, while Edwards lost in St. James.

Edwards announced his resignation in late 1995, and Lamoureux again stood for the party leadership. He was again regarded as an "anti-establishment" candidate, this time facing Ginny Hasselfield, who was supported by the party's leadership. This contest was very divisive, and its ending was controversial. All party members could cast a ballot, and the results were "weighted" by constituency. It is generally acknowledged that Lamoureux received more votes from the party members than Hasselfield. Because his support was concentrated in north Winnipeg, however, Hasselfield won the weighted vote by 21 points.

Defeat and return

The divisions in the Manitoba Liberal Party continued after the leadership contest. Following the 1997 Canadian federal election, Lamoureux and Gary Kowalski announced that they could no longer support Hasselfield's leadership and would sit as "Independent Liberals". This decision left Neil Gaudry as the party's only official member of the legislature. Facing increased pressure, Hasselfield agreed to resign as party leader in early 1998. Former MP Jon Gerrard was elected as her successor, and Lamoureux and Kowalski rejoined the party caucus.

The Liberal Party entered the 1999 provincial election in a weakened state, damaged by the divisions of the previous years. The election itself became polarized between the governing Progressive Conservatives and the opposition New Democratic Party, and the Liberal Party's support fell significantly. Although still personally popular, Lamoureux was narrowly defeated by New Democrat Becky Barrett.

Lamoureux ran as a Liberal Party candidate in Winnipeg Centre in the 2000 Canadian federal election. He finished second to New Democratic Party (NDP) incumbent Pat Martin.

Becky Barrett did not seek re-election in 2003, and Lamoureux was again elected to the legislature for Inkster. The only other Liberal to win election in this campaign was Jon Gerrard. Both Lamoureux and Gerrard were re-elected in the 2007 election, but the party did not make any further gains.

== Member of the House of Commons ==
Lamoureux resigned his provincial seat in 2010 to seek election to the House of Commons of Canada in a by-election that was held to fill the vacancy caused by the resignation of NDP MP Judy Wasylycia-Leis, who stepped down to run for mayor. He was elected over NDP candidate Kevin Chief, and was re-elected in the 2011 federal election a few months later by a margin of just 44 votes over NDP candidate Rebecca Blaikie. He and Ralph Goodale, who was re-elected in Wascana around Regina, Saskatchewan, were the only two Liberal MPs elected from the Prairie provinces; nationally the party won only 34 seats, the fewest it has ever won.

Lamoureux won re-election in 2015 by a landslide, turning what had been a safe seat for the NDP into one of the Liberals’ strongest seats on the federal stage with almost 70% of the popular vote. He was the only incumbent MP from Winnipeg who was re-elected in 2015, and the Liberals also won a majority government. He was re-elected with a diminished plurality in the 2019 Canadian federal election.

In 2021 the Commissioner of Canada Elections ruled Lamoureux had violated in the Canada Elections Act in the 2019 election. Lamoureux was found to have made seven advertisements on Facebook and Instagram on election day contrary to the prohibition on election day advertising. Lamoureux was ordered to pay a $300 fine. He was re-elected with an absolute majority in the 2021 election.

In the 2025 Liberal Party of Canada leadership election, he endorsed Chrystia Freeland.

== Electoral record ==
=== Federal ===
2025 Canadian federal election: Winnipeg North
** Preliminary results — Not yet official **
| Party | Candidate | Votes | % | ±% | Expenditures |
|---|---|---|---|---|---|
| Liberal | Kevin Lamoureux | 19,326 | 57.79 | +4.58 | |
| Conservative | Rachel Punzalan | 11,508 | 34.41 | +20.92 | |
| New Democratic | Adebayo Akinrogunde | 2,037 | 6.09 | –21.66 | |
| People's | Jessica Bailon | 265 | 0.79 | –3.25 | |
| Green | Angela Brydges | 193 | 0.58 | –0.65 | |
| Communist | Sarah Borbridge | 112 | 0.33 | +0.04 | |
| Total valid votes/expense limit | | | | | |
| Total rejected ballots | | | | | |
| Turnout | | 33,441 | 57.26 | | |
| Eligible voters | | 58,402 | | | |
| Liberal notional hold | | Swing | | –8.17 | |
Source: Elections Canada

2021 Canadian federal election: Winnipeg North
| Party | Candidate | Votes | % | ±% | Expenditures |
|---|---|---|---|---|---|
| Liberal | Kevin Lamoureux | 16,442 | 52.3 | +4.7 | $59,209.35 |
| New Democratic | Melissa Chung-Mowat | 8,998 | 28.6 | +2.7 | $55,328.22 |
| Conservative | Anas Kassem | 4,126 | 13.1 | -7.7 | $4,770.97 |
| People's | Patrick Neilan | 1,315 | 4.2 | +3.2 | $0.00 |
| Green | Angela Brydges | 418 | 1.3 | -1.5 | $0.00 |
| Communist | Robert Crooks | 109 | 0.3 | -0.1 | $0.00 |
| Total valid votes/expense limit | | 31,408 | 99.1 | – | $103,513.27 |
| Total rejected ballots | | 287 | 0.9 | | |
| Turnout | | 31,695 | 50.8 | | |
| Eligible voters | | 62,419 | | | |
| Liberal hold | | Swing | | +1.0 | |
Source: Elections Canada

2019 Canadian federal election: Winnipeg North
| Party | Candidate | Votes | % | ±% | Expenditures |
|---|---|---|---|---|---|
| Liberal | Kevin Lamoureux | 15,581 | 47.60 | -21.30 | $58,222.18 |
| New Democratic | Kyle Mason | 8,469 | 25.87 | +12.50 | none listed |
| Conservative | Jordyn Ham | 6,820 | 20.83 | +5.54 | $1,264.48 |
| Green | Sai Shanthanand Rajagopal | 906 | 2.77 | +0.34 | $503.13 |
| People's | ~~Victor Ong~~ | 324 | 0.99 | -- | $0.00 |
| Christian Heritage | Henry Hizon | 279 | 0.85 | -- | none listed |
| Independent | Kathy Doyle | 231 | 0.71 | -- | none listed |
| Communist | Andrew Taylor | 125 | 0.38 | -- | none listed |
| Total valid votes/expense limit | | 32,735 | 99.26 | | |
| Total rejected ballots | | 243 | 0.74 | -0.05 | |
| Turnout | | 32,978 | 51.79 | -6.66 | |
| Eligible voters | | 63,681 | | | |
| Liberal hold | | Swing | | -16.90 | |
Source: Elections Canada
Victor Ong was nominated by the People's Party, but resigned on 8 October. As the deadline had passed, his name remained on the ballot.

2015 Canadian federal election: Winnipeg North
| Party | Candidate | Votes | % | ±% | Expenditures |
|---|---|---|---|---|---|
| Liberal | Kevin Lamoureux | 23,402 | 68.90 | +33.91 | $83,435.85 |
| Conservative | Harpreet Turka | 5,193 | 15.29 | -12.07 | $35,641.92 |
| New Democratic | Levy Abad | 4,543 | 13.38 | -22.02 | $25,774.97 |
| Green | John Redekopp | 826 | 2.43 | +0.65 | $833.17 |
| Total valid votes/expense limit | | 33,964 | 99.21 | | $193,725.29 |
| Total rejected ballots | | 269 | 0.79 | – | |
| Turnout | | 34,233 | 58.45 | | |
| Eligible voters | | 58,573 | | | |
| Liberal notional gain from New Democratic | | Swing | | +27.97 | |
Source: Elections Canada

2011 Canadian federal election: Winnipeg North
| Party | Candidate | Votes | % | ±% | Expenditures |
|---|---|---|---|---|---|
| Liberal | Kevin Lamoureux | 9,097 | 35.78 | -10.54 | $75,214.57 |
| New Democratic | Rebecca Blaikie | 9,053 | 35.60 | -5.57 | $71,243.32 |
| Conservative | Ann Matejicka | 6,701 | 26.35 | +15.9 | $40,787.18 |
| Green | John Harvie | 458 | 1.80 | +1.08 | $0.00 |
| Communist | Frank Komarniski | 118 | 0.46 | +0.01 | $502.42 |
| Total valid votes/expense limit | | 25,427 | 100.00 | – | |
| Total rejected ballots | | 136 | 0.53 | -0.04 | |
| Turnout | | 25,563 | 50.01 | +19.2 | |
| Eligible voters | | 51,115 | – | | |
| Liberal hold | | Swing | | -4.97 | |

Canadian federal by-election, November 29, 2010: Winnipeg North
| Party | Candidate | Votes | % | ±% | Expenditures |
|---|---|---|---|---|---|
| Liberal | Kevin Lamoureux | 7,303 | 46.32 | +37.10 | $74,020.45 |
| New Democratic | Kevin Chief | 6,490 | 41.17 | -21.44 | $64,585.69 |
| Conservative | Julie Javier | 1,647 | 10.45 | -11.90 | $53,166.90 |
| Green | John Harvie | 114 | 0.72 | -4.03 | $1,410.65 |
| Pirate | Jeff Coleman | 94 | 0.60 | – | $62.08 |
| Communist | Frank Komarniski | 71 | 0.45 | -0.22 | $192.32 |
| Christian Heritage | Eric Truijen | 46 | 0.29 | – | $1,790 |
| Total valid votes/Expense limit | | 15,765 | 100.00 | | $77,132 |
| Total rejected ballots | | 91 | 0.57 | +0.07 | |
| Turnout | | 15,856 | 30.8 | -12 | |
| Eligible voters | | N/A | – | | |
Due to the resignation of Judy Wasylycia-Leis on April 30, 2010
| Liberal gain from New Democratic | | Swing | | +29.27 | |

2000 Canadian federal election: Winnipeg Centre
| Party | Candidate | Votes | % | Expenditures |
|---|---|---|---|---|
| New Democratic | Pat Martin | 11,263 | 41.26 | $55,756.93 |
| Liberal | Kevin Lamoureux | 9,310 | 34.11 | $55,979.28 |
| Alliance | Reg Smith | 3,975 | 14.56 | $8,032.54 |
| Progressive Conservative | Michel Allard | 1,915 | 7.02 | $1,460.02 |
| Green | Mikel Magnusson | 698 | 2.56 | $1,572.64 |
| Communist | Harold Dyck | 134 | 0.49 | $288.78 |
| Total valid votes | | 27,295 | 100.00 | |
| Total rejected ballots | | 236 | | |
| Turnout | | 27,531 | 52.56 | |
| Electors on the lists | | 52,383 | | |
Sources: Official Results, Elections Canada and Financial Returns, Elections Canada.

=== Provincial ===
2007 Manitoba general election: Inkster
| Party | Candidate | Votes | % | ±% | Expenditures |
|---|---|---|---|---|---|
| Liberal | Kevin Lamoureux | 3,962 | 57.49 | +4.10 | $26,490.96 |
| New Democratic | Romulo Magsino | 2,358 | 34.13 | −7.33 | $26,612.09 |
| Progressive Conservative | Roger Bennett | 543 | 7.89 | +4.24 | $8,590.43 |
| Total valid votes | | 6,863 | 99.58 | | |
| Rejected and declined votes | | 29 | | | |
| Turnout | | 6,892 | 61.43 | +0.07 | |
| Electors on the lists | | 11,215 | | | |

2003 Manitoba general election: Inkster
| Party | Candidate | Votes | % | ±% | Expenditures |
|---|---|---|---|---|---|
| Liberal | Kevin Lamoureux | 3,671 | 53.39 | +10.75 | $27,970.42 |
| New Democratic | Mario Santos | 2,851 | 41.46 | −2.99 | $21,230.80 |
| Progressive Conservative | Michael T. Ledarney | 251 | 3.65 | −9.26 | $10.69 |
| Green | Mario Ducusin | 103 | 1.50 | +1.50 | $174.48 |
| Total valid votes | | 6,876 | 100.0 | | |
| Total rejected ballots | | 79 | – | – | |
| Turnout | | 6,955 | 61.36 | −10.91 | |
| Eligible voters | | 11,335 | | | |
| Liberal gain from New Democratic | | Swing | | +6.87 | |

1999 Manitoba general election: Inkster
| Party | Candidate | Votes | % | ±% | Expenditures |
|---|---|---|---|---|---|
| New Democratic | Becky Barrett | 3,501 | 44.45 | +14.22 | $22,767.00 |
| Liberal | Kevin Lamoureux | 3,358 | 42.64 | -7.50 | $23,318.00 |
| Progressive Conservative | George Sandhu | 1,017 | 12.91 | -2.88 | $27,661.71 |
| Total valid votes | | 7,876 | 100.00 | – | |
| Rejected and declined ballots | | 50 | 0.63 | 0 | |
| Turnout | | 7,926 | 72.27 | +4.82 | |
| Electors on the lists | | 10,967 | | | |
| New Democratic gain from Liberal | | Swing | | +10.86 | |

1995 Manitoba general election: Inkster
| Party | Candidate | Votes | % | ±% |
|---|---|---|---|---|
| Liberal | Kevin Lamoureux | 4,394 | 50.14 | +4.54 |
| New Democratic | Poy Gomez | 2,649 | 30.23 | -3.15 |
| Progressive Conservative | Scott Fielding | 1,384 | 15.79 | -2.13 |
| Independent | Scott Kowall | 223 | 3.84 | – |
| Total valid votes | | 8,706 | 100.00 | – |
| Rejected and declined ballots | | 56 | 0.63 | +0.7 |
| Turnout | | 8,762 | 67.45 | +3.17 |
| Electors on the lists | | 12,989 | | |
| Liberal hold | | Swing | | +3.8 |

1990 Manitoba general election: Inkster
| Party | Candidate | Votes | % | ±% |
|---|---|---|---|---|
| Liberal | Kevin Lamoureux | 3,602 | 45.60 | +3.80 |
| New Democratic | Ajit Deol | 2,637 | 33.38 | -4.40 |
| Progressive Conservative | Raj Mehta | 1,416 | 17.92 | -1.91 |
| Western Independence | Gordon Haddad | 198 | 3.10 | – |
| Total valid votes | | 7,898 | 100.00 | – |
| Rejected and declined ballots | | 45 | 0.56 | +0.14 |
| Turnout | | 7,943 | 64.28 | -5.17 |
| Electors on the lists | | 12,287 | | |
| Liberal hold | | Swing | | +4.1 |

1988 Manitoba general election: Inkster
| Party | Candidate | Votes | % | ±% |
|---|---|---|---|---|
| Liberal | Kevin Lamoureux | 4,466 | 41.80 | +30.83 |
| New Democratic | Don Scott | 4,098 | 37.78 | -26.31 |
| Progressive Conservative | Resty Taruc | 2,151 | 19.83 | -0.35 |
| Communist | Nancy Watkins | 64 | 0.59 | +0.02 |
| Turnout | | 10,845 | 69.45 | +9.2 |
| Liberal gain from New Democratic | | Swing | | +28.57 |
Source: Elections Manitoba

1986 Manitoba general election: Logan
| Party | Candidate | Votes | % | ±% |
|---|---|---|---|---|
| New Democratic | Maureen Hemphill | 3,765 | 73.07 | +1.08 |
| Progressive Conservative | Doris Perron | 791 | 15.35 | +2.73 |
| Liberal | Kevin Lamoureux | 502 | 9.74 | – |
| Libertarian | Dennis Owens | 94 | 1.84 | – |
| Turnout | | 5,195 | 56.00 | -5.72 |
| New Democratic hold | | Swing | | -0.83 |
Source: Elections Manitoba
