= Manitoba Liberal Party =

Provincial political party in Canada

- Leader: Willard Reaves
- President: Terry Hayward
- Deputy Leaders: Cindy Lamoureux; Jasbir Singh
- Parliamentary Leader: Cindy Lamoureux
- Founded: 1870; 156 years ago
- Headquarters: 635 Broadway; Winnipeg, Manitoba; R3C 0X1
- Youth wing: Manitoba Young Liberals
- Ideology: Liberalism
- Political position: Centre
- Colours: Red
- Seats in Legislature: 1 / 57

Website
- www.manitobaliberals.ca

The Manitoba Liberal Party (French: Parti libéral du Manitoba) is a political party in Manitoba, Canada. Its roots can be traced to the late 19th century, following the province's creation in 1870.

== History ==
=== Origins and early development (to 1883) ===
Originally, there were no official political parties in Manitoba, although many leading politicians were affiliated with parties that existed at the national level. In Manitoba's first Legislative Assembly (1871–1874), the leader of the opposition was Edward Hay, a Liberal who represented the interests of recent anglophone immigrants from Ontario. Not a party leader as such, he was still a leading voice for the newly transplanted "Ontario Grit" tradition. In 1874, Hay served as Minister of Public Works in the government of Marc-Amable Girard, which included both Conservatives and Liberals.

During the 1870s, a Liberal network began to emerge in the city of Winnipeg. One of the key figures in this network was William Luxton, owner of the Manitoba Free Press newspaper and himself a member of the Manitoba legislature on two occasions. Luxton was not initially supportive of Premier Robert A. Davis (1874–1878), but endorsed the Davis ministry after he brought John Norquay into cabinet (Davis' early supporters were primarily from the francophone community, and Norquay's presence gave the ministry greater credibility among the anglophone population). Luxton subsequently supported Davis and Norquay against Conservative Orangeman Thomas Scott, a leader of the local opposition (not to be confused with the figure executed by Louis Riel in 1870).

Although the Davis administration was on favourable terms with federal Liberal Prime Minister Alexander Mackenzie (1873–1878), his successor Norquay was more closely aligned with the federal Conservatives. This was partly a matter of necessity. As a small province, Manitoba needed to be on favourable terms with whatever party was in power at the federal level. As such, when John A. Macdonald's Conservatives were returned to power in 1878, the local balance of power began to shift. Luxton's Liberal network supported Norquay against Scott in 1878 and 1879, but was subsequently marginalized by the Norquay government. In 1882, Norquay forged a new alliance with the province's Conservatives.

=== Leadership of Thomas Greenway (1883–1904) ===
In 1882, Thomas Greenway formed a new organization known as the Provincial Rights Party, which called for greater provincial control over resources and the railway.

Based in the province's rural areas, this group soon surpassed the Winnipeg Liberals as the dominant opposition to Norquay. After the election of 1883, Greenway united the opposition MLAs into the Manitoba Liberals (which were soon recognized as a de facto political party). For the next 21 years, Greenway's control over the party would be unchallenged.

Following the 1888 general election, Greenway's Liberals took power and formed Manitoba's first declared partisan government. As premier, Greenway ended federal disallowance of Manitoba railway legislation and the Canadian Pacific Railway's monopoly, bringing the Northern Pacific into the province to induce competition in freight rates.

The Greenway government's most notable feat in office was curtailing the rights of Manitoba's French Canadian population. Manitoba had been founded as a bilingual province, but Greenway's government provoked the Manitoba Schools Question, ending the educational rights of (predominantly French) Catholics, and making the public school system entirely English and Protestant. English became the province's sole official language.

Greenway was able to win large majorities in 1892 and 1896, based largely on single-issue populism relating to the schools question. After this was resolved in 1897, his government became increasingly directionless.

In 1899, the Liberals were defeated by the Hugh John Macdonald-led Manitoba Conservative Party.

The Liberals were unable to regain their previous support base in the decade that followed. Greenway continued to lead the party through a disastrous 1903 campaign, winning only 9 seats. He resigned in 1904 to run for federal office as MP for Lisgar.

=== Early 20th century ===
Charles Mickle was chosen parliamentary leader on December 5, 1904, and led the party until a provincial convention was held in late March 1906. That convention acclaimed Edward Brown as the party's new leader. Brown failed to win a seat in the 1907 election, however, and resigned shortly thereafter. Mickle again became the party's legislative leader, and served as leader of the opposition until leaving politics in 1909.

Tobias Norris became Liberal leader in 1910. When the Tories under Rodmond Roblin resigned amid scandal in 1915, Norris became the province's premier, and retained the position until 1922. The Norris Liberals introduced temperance laws, suffrage for women, workers compensation, compulsory education, and minimum wage, as well as the establishment of a public-nursing system, rural farm credit, regulation of industrial conditions, and a mother's allowance for widowed dependent mothers.

The Norris administration's relationship with the Liberal Party of Canada under Wilfrid Laurier was often antagonistic. Norris withdrew funding for French-language education in 1916, at a time when the federal Liberals were attempting to regain the support of Quebec nationalists. The Manitoba Liberals also supported Robert Borden's Union government in the election of 1917 (see Conscription Crisis of 1917), and were not reconciled with the "Laurier Liberals" until 1922. Even then, they refused to officially re-align themselves with the federal party.

The Liberals were swept from power in 1922 by the United Farmers of Manitoba, who were also known as the Progressive Party. Norris continued to lead the party through most of the 1920s, but was replaced by Hugh Robson before the 1927 election (which was again won by the Progressives). Robson, in turn, resigned on January 3, 1930. He was replaced as parliamentary leader by James Breakey. In 1931, Murdoch Mackay was selected as the party's official leader.

=== Liberal-Progressive Party: Merger with the Progressives ===
Pressured by William Lyon Mackenzie King, Mackay brought the Liberals into a coalition with Premier John Bracken's Progressives before the 1932 election. The national Progressive Party had been largely absorbed into the Liberal Party of Canada by this time, and King believed that it was foolish to divide the resources of the parties within Manitoba. He was especially concerned that the Conservatives could recapture the provincial government if the Liberals and Progressives were not united.

For the election of 1932, the provincial government referred to itself as "Liberal-Progressive" (effectively a fusion of the parties, albeit one dominated by Progressives). A small group of Liberals, led by St. Boniface mayor David Campbell, opposed the merger and ran as "Continuing Liberals". They were resoundingly defeated. After the election, the Liberals of Manitoba were absorbed into the Progressive Party. Two non-coalition Liberals were elected in 1936, but they were not intended to represent a rival party.

Despite being dominated by Progressives, the merged party soon became popularly known as the "Liberal Party of Manitoba". The federal Progressive Party had long since disappeared, and the "Progressive" name had little continued meaning in Manitoba politics.

==== 1940s and 1950s ====
In 1940, Bracken's Liberal-Progressives forged an even broader coalition, bringing the Conservatives, Co-operative Commonwealth Federation, and Social Credit in a "non-partisan" government. This coalition governed the province until 1950, although the CCF left in 1943.

The Liberal-Progressive governments were cautious and moderate. Bracken's government undertook few major initiatives, and was unfriendly to labour issues even during its alliance with the CCF. Following World War II, the government of Stuart Garson (who replaced Bracken as premier in January 1943) led a program of rapid rural electrification, but was otherwise as cautious as Bracken's. Garson left provincial politics in 1948 to join the federal Liberal Cabinet of Louis St. Laurent.

The government of Garson's successor, Douglas Lloyd Campbell, was socially conservative and generally opposed to state intervention of any sort. The educational system remained primitive (it was dominated by one-room schoolhouses well into the 1950s), and no significant steps were taken on language or labour issues. The province did modernize its liquor laws during this period, however. Despite its Liberal-Progressive label, Campbell's government was one of the most right-wing provincial governments in Canada. It had somewhat frosty relations with the federal Liberals in the 1950s despite Garson being an influential cabinet minister.

The Liberal-Progressives lost their majority in the 1958 provincial election by the Progressive Conservatives under Dufferin Roblin. Campbell initially hoped to stay in office with a minority government supported by the CCF, but this was brought to nothing, and the CCF threw its support to a PC minority government. However, the Manitoba PCs were dominated by Red Tories, and Roblin's government was actually well to the left of Campbell's government.

=== Manitoba Liberal Party: Declining popularity (1960s–1970s) ===
Gildas Molgat, a protégé of Campbell, became party leader in 1961. Earlier that year, the party had formally renamed itself as simply the "Manitoba Liberal Party," over only scattered objections from Progressive diehards. Molgat prevented the Liberals from falling to third-party status during the 1960s, but never posed a serious threat to Roblin's government.

Robert Bend, a former minister under Campbell, came out of retirement to lead the party in 1969. However, Bend's rural populism did not play well with urban voters. Under his leadership, the party adopted a "cowboy"/"rodeo" theme for the campaign, which made it look and sound dated. The election that followed was an unmitigated disaster; the party dropped to only five seats, the fewest it had ever won. Bend himself was unsuccessful in his bid to succeed Campbell in his own riding. A succession of leaders, including Israel Asper (1970–1975), Charles Huband (1975–1978), and Doug Lauchlan (1980–1982) were unable to prevent the party's decline.

Well into the 1970s, the party was considered very right-wing for its time, despite the Liberal label. This was especially true under Asper's leadership; during his tenure as party leader Asper supported laissez-faire economics and an end to the welfare state—putting it to the right of the Tories. The party largely distanced itself from its right-wing past in the mid-1970s. By this time, however, the province was polarized between the Tories and the New Democratic Party of Manitoba (NDP, successor to the Manitoba CCF), and the Liberals were unable to present themselves as a viable alternative. The party bottomed out in the 1981 election, when it was completely shut out of the legislature for the first time ever.

=== 1980s–1990 ===
In 1984, the party chose Sharon Carstairs as its new leader. She was elected to the assembly in the 1986 election, and in the 1988 election, led the party to 20 seats—its best showing since 1953—and official opposition status. This was precipitated by the unpopularity of Howard Pawley's New Democratic government, which allowed the Liberals to win the support of many centre-left voters.

The Liberals' resurgence sparked hopes that they could win the next election. This proved to be a temporary recovery. The NDP revived under Gary Doer, and the Liberals slipped back into third place in the 1990 election with only seven seats, against 20 for the NDP and 30 for the Conservatives. Many in the party felt Carstairs had squandered their best chance of winning government in three decades.

=== Further decline (1993–2013) ===
Carstairs was replaced as leader by Paul Edwards in 1993. By the time the 1995 election was called, the party had managed to recover to a strong second-place position in the polls. They ran a poor campaign, however, and were again overtaken by the NDP well before election day. Despite having almost 24% of popular support, the Liberals won only three seats and lost official party status. Edwards, who was defeated in his own riding, stepped down as party leader in 1996.

The leadership convention of 1996 exposed deep divisions in the party, as Ginny Hasselfield defeated Member of the Legislative Assembly (MLA) Kevin Lamoureux by only 21 votes. Two of the party's three MLAs (Lamoureux and Gary Kowalski) subsequently sat as "Independent Liberals", and there were threats of legal action between Hasselfield and Lamoureux. The party was only reunited when Hasselfield resigned in 1998, replaced by former federal Member of Parliament (MP) Jon Gerrard.

Liberal Party support fell by 10% in the election of 1999, which allowed Gary Doer's New Democrats to regain centre-left support and win government. Gerrard became the party's only MLA, winning election in the upscale riding of River Heights, Carstairs' old riding. The party failed to recover much of its support base in the 2003 election, although Lamoureux was able to regain his seat in north Winnipeg to become the party's second MLA.

Despite Lamoureux's re-election, the Liberal popular vote fell in 2003 even through the party managed to field a full slate of candidates (they were 7 shy in 1999). The Liberals did have more second-place finishes than in the previous election, which appeared to be a sign of a rebound. If the party had any momentum to build upon, it was negated by a weak campaign in the 2007 provincial election. Gerrard and Lamoureux were both re-elected, but the party's popular support declined to just above 12%. They also had fewer second-place finishes than they had in 1999.

=== Minor party (2010s–present) ===
The 2011 provincial election resulted in Jon Gerrard being the only Liberal MLA being elected. He subsequently announced his intention to resign as party leader after serving in the position for 15 years.

On October 26, 2013, the Manitoba Liberal Party held a leadership convention in Winnipeg. The contested nomination saw three individuals put their name forward: Bob Axworthy (younger brother of Lloyd Axworthy, former MP, federal Minister of various portfolios, and MLA), Rana Bokhari, and Dougald Lamont. Bokhari was elected leader of the party with 431 ballots cast.

In preparation of the 2016 Manitoba general election, the Liberals nominated candidates in all 57 ridings. The party initially had high hopes for the election after a strong showing by the federal Liberals in the 2015 federal election, in which they took all but one seat in Winnipeg. By the time of the writ, Elections Manitoba disqualified four candidates due to improper paperwork and a fifth for being an enumerator while collecting signatures for her candidacy. The Liberals found their pre-writ polling of approximately 25% fall to 14% on Election Day, gaining two seats. Bokhari would finish third in her own seat of Fort Rouge. On May 7, 2016, Bokhari announced that she would not lead the party into the next election but would remain on as leader until her successor was chosen, though she would ultimately resign in September to enter the private sector. Judy Klassen, one of the two new Liberal MLAs elected in 2016 along with Cindy Lamoureux, served as the interim leader of the Manitoba Liberal Party until June 13, 2017, when she stepped down to become a leadership candidate. Dougald Lamont would ultimately be elected Manitoba Liberal leader at the October 21, 2017 Liberal leadership election, defeating Cindy Lamoureux on the second ballot by eight votes.

On July 17, 2018, Lamont won a by-election in St. Boniface, becoming the party's fourth MLA and giving the Liberals official party status for the first time in 23 years. The by-election followed the resignation of former NDP Premier Greg Selinger.

Lamont led the Manitoba Liberals into the 2019 provincial election with four MLAs, though Judy Klassen would not seek re-election. The three other incumbent Liberal MLA were returned, with Lamont being re-elected in St. Boniface, while Gerrard was re-elected in River Heights, and Cindy Lamoureux won in Tyndall Park.

Lamont remained the Liberal leader into the 2023 provincial election. The party, however, would suffer a nearly four-point swing away in terms of vote percentage and would return only one MLA, as the New Democrats were swept into power. Gerrard and Lamont lost their seats to New Democrats Mike Moroz and Robert Loiselle respectively, though Lamoureux improved her vote percentage by a small margin. Lamont would resign as leader of the Manitoba Liberal Party that evening. Gerrard's defeat in River Heights would mark the first time a New Democrat held the seat, the first time since 1999 that a Liberal would not, and only the second time since 1986 that a Liberal would not hold the seat after PC MLA Mike Radcliffe held the seat from 1995 to 1999.

On October 17, 2023, Cindy Lamoureux was appointed as the interim party leader.

On September 29, 2025, former Winnipeg Blue Bombers player and former deputy leader and candidate Willard Reaves was acclaimed as the new Liberal Party leader.

== Party leaders ==
Liberal Party leaders

- Thomas Greenway, 1882–1904
- Charles Mickle, December 5, 1904 – March 28, 1906 (parliamentary leader)
- Edward Brown, March 28, 1906 – 1908
- Charles Mickle, January 1908 – 1910 (parliamentary leader)
- Tobias Norris, 1910 – March 20, 1927
- Hugh Robson, March 20, 1927 – January 3, 1930
- James Breakey, January 3, 1930 – June 26, 1931 (parliamentary leader)
- Murdoch Mackay, June 26, 1931 – 1932

"Continuing Liberal" leaders

- David Campbell, 1932

Liberal-Progressive Party leaders

- John Bracken, 1932 – January 1943
- Stuart Garson, January 1943 – November 1948
- Douglas Campbell, November 1948 – April 19, 1961

Liberal Party leaders (renewal)

- Gildas Molgat, April 20, 1961 – May 10, 1969
- Robert Bend, May 10, 1969 – June 25, 1969
- Stan Roberts (interim), June 25, 1969 – October 31, 1970
- Israel Asper, October 31, 1970 – February 22, 1975
- Charles Huband, February 22, 1975 – 1978

Vacant 1978 - November 30, 1980 (Senator Gildas Molgat was party president)
Lloyd Axworthy 1977 – 1979 (parliamentary leader
June Westbury 1979 – 1980 (parliamentary leader)

- Doug Lauchlan, November 30, 1980 – 1982

Vacant 1982 - March 4, 1984 (Senator Gildas Molgat was party president)

- Sharon Carstairs, March 4, 1984 – June 4, 1993
- Paul Edwards, June 4, 1993 – October 19, 1996
- Ginny Hasselfield, October 19, 1996 – October 17, 1998
- Jon Gerrard, October 17, 1998 – October 26, 2013
- Rana Bokhari, October 26, 2013 – September 24, 2016
- Paul Hesse (acting), September 24, 2016 – October 21, 2016
  Jon Gerrard, September 24, 2016 – October 21, 2016 (parliamentary leader)
- Judy Klassen (interim), October 21, 2016 – June 13, 2017 (resigned to run for leader)
- Paul Brault (acting), June 13, 2017 – October 21, 2017
  Jon Gerrard, June 13, 2017 – October 21, 2017 (parliamentary leader)
- Dougald Lamont, October 21, 2017 – October 3, 2023
- Cindy Lamoureux (interim), October 17, 2023 – September 29, 2025
- Willard Reaves, September 29, 2025 – present

(Note: Stan Roberts served as the party's acting leader from 1969 to 1970, after Robert Bend was defeated in the province's 1969 election. Although Lloyd Axworthy was the party's only MLA from 1977 to 1979, he was never party leader. Likewise Jon Gerrard remained the party's only MLA between 2013 and 2016 after relinquishing the party leadership in 2013.)

== Election results ==
Election	Leader	Seats won	Seat change	Seats place	Popular vote	% of popular vote	Legislative role	Notes
1879	–	2 / 24	Steady	2nd			Opposition	Conservative majority
1883	Thomas Greenway	10 / 30	▲8	2nd			Opposition	Conservative majority
1886	Thomas Greenway	15 / 35	▲5	2nd			Opposition	Conservative majority
1888	Thomas Greenway	33 / 38	▲18	▲1st			Majority	
1892	Thomas Greenway	28 / 40	▼5	1st			Majority	
1896	Thomas Greenway	32 / 40	▲4	1st			Majority	
1899	Thomas Greenway	17 / 40	▼15	▼2nd			Opposition	Conservative majority
1903	Thomas Greenway	8 / 40	▼9	2nd	23,740	44.60%	Opposition	Conservative majority
1907	Edward Brown	13 / 41	▲5	2nd	29,476	47.90%	Opposition	Conservative majority
1910	Tobias Norris	13 / 41	Steady	2nd	35,353	47.1%	Opposition	Conservative majority
1914	Tobias Norris	20 / 49	▲7	2nd	61,797	42.36%	Opposition	Conservative majority
1915	Tobias Norris	40 / 47	▲20	▲1st		55.1%	Majority	
1920	Tobias Norris	21 / 55	▼19	1st		35.1%	Minority	
1922	Tobias Norris	8 / 55	▼13	▼2nd		33.2%	Opposition	Progressive majority
1927	Hugh Robson	7 / 55	▼1	▼3rd		20.7%	Opposition	Progressive majority
1932	John Bracken	38 / 55		1st		39.6%	Majority^{1}	
1936	John Bracken	23 / 55	▼15	1st		35.3%	Majority	
1941	John Bracken	27 / 55	▲4	1st		35.1%	Coalition majority	Coalition with Progressive Conservative Party
1945	John Bracken	25 / 55	▲2	1st		32.2%	Coalition majority	Coalition with Progressive Conservative Party
1949	Douglas Lloyd Campbell	31 / 57	▲6	1st		38.7%	Coalition majority	Coalition with Progressive Conservative Party
1953	Douglas Lloyd Campbell	35 / 57	▲4	1st	117,887	44.05%	Majority	
1958	Douglas Lloyd Campbell	19 / 57	▼16	▼2nd	–	34.7%	Opposition	PC minority
1959	Douglas Lloyd Campbell	11 / 57	▼8	2nd	94,799	30.0%	Opposition	PC majority
1962	Gildas Molgat	13 / 57	▲2	2nd	103,283	36.1%	Opposition^{2}	PC majority
1966	Gildas Molgat	14 / 57	▲1	2nd	107,841	33.13%	Opposition	PC majority
1969	Robert Bend	5 / 57	▼9	▼3rd	80,288	23.99%	Third party	NDP minority
1973	Izzy Asper	5 / 57	Steady	3rd	88,907	19.04%	Third party	NDP majority
1977	Charles Huband	1 / 57	▼4	3rd	59,865	12.29%	Third party	PC majority
1981	Doug Lauchlan	0 / 57	▼1	▼no seats	32,373	6.70%	No seats	NDP majority
1986	Sharon Carstairs	1 / 57	▲1	▲3rd	66,469	13.92%	Third party	NDP majority
1988	Sharon Carstairs	20 / 57	▲19	▲2nd	190,913	35.52%	Opposition	PC minority
1990	Sharon Carstairs	7 / 57	▼13	▼3rd	138,146	28.15%	Third party	PC majority
1995	Paul Edwards	3 / 57	▼4	3rd	119,677	23.72%	Third party	PC majority
1999	Jon Gerrard	1 / 57	▼2	3rd	66,111	13.40%	Third party	NDP majority
2003	Jon Gerrard	2 / 57	▲1	3rd	52,123	13.19%	Third party	NDP majority
2007	Jon Gerrard	2 / 57	Steady	3rd	51,857	12.39%	Third party	NDP majority
2011	Jon Gerrard	1 / 57	▼1	3rd	32,420	7.52%	Third party	NDP majority
2016	Rana Bokhari	3 / 57	▲2	3rd	62,985	14.46%	Third party	PC majority
2019	Dougald Lamont	3 / 57	Steady	3rd	67,978	14.48%	Third party	PC majority
2023	Dougald Lamont	1 / 57	▼2	3rd	51,634	10.63%	Third party	NDP majority

^{1}Liberals for alliance with the governing Progressive Party to run joint Liberal-Progressive candidates. The parties merge and become the Liberal-Progressive Party.
^{2}Liberal-Progressive Party renames itself the Liberal Party of Manitoba.

== See also ==
- List of Manitoba general elections
- Manitoba Liberal Party leadership elections
