= Sharon Carstairs =

Canadian politician and former Senator

The Honourable Sharon Carstairs PC CM

Leader of the Government in the Senate
- In office January 9, 2001 – December 11, 2003
- Prime Minister: Jean Chrétien
- Deputy: Fernand Robichaud
- Whip: Léonce Mercier; Bill Rompkey
- Preceded by: Bernie Boudreau
- Succeeded by: Jack Austin

Minister with Special Responsibility for Palliative Care
- In office March 14, 2001 – December 11, 2003
- Prime Minister: Jean Chrétien
- Preceded by: Position established
- Succeeded by: Position abolished

Leader of the Opposition in Manitoba
- In office July 21, 1988 – August 7, 1990
- Preceded by: Gary Filmon
- Succeeded by: Gary Doer

Leader of the Manitoba Liberal Party
- In office March 4, 1984 – June 5, 1993
- Preceded by: Doug Lauchlan
- Succeeded by: Paul Edwards
Parliamentary constituencies
Canadian Senator from Manitoba
In office September 15, 1994 – October 17, 2011
Nominated by	Jean Chrétien
Appointed by	Ray Hnatyshyn
Preceded by	Douglas Everett
Succeeded by	JoAnne Buth (2012)
Member of the Legislative Assembly of Manitoba for River Heights
In office March 18, 1986 – September 15, 1994
Preceded by	Warren Steen
Succeeded by	Mike Radcliffe (1995)

Personal details
- Born: April 26, 1942 (age 84) Halifax, Nova Scotia, Canada
- Party: Liberal
- Other political affiliations: Manitoba Liberal
- Parent: Harold Connolly (father)
- Portfolio: Federal: Minister with Special Responsibility for Palliative Care (2001-2003); Leader of the Government in the Senate (2001-2003); Deputy Leader of the Government in the Senate (1997-1999)

Sharon Carstairs PC CM (born April 26, 1942) is a Canadian politician. She was elected to the Legislative Assembly of Manitoba for the riding of River Heights, serving as Leader of the Opposition in Manitoba, and leader of the Manitoba Liberal Party. After her career in provincial politics, Carstairs was appointed to the Senate of Canada by Prime Minister Jean Chrétien.

== Early life ==
Carstairs was born in Halifax, Nova Scotia, the daughter of former Nova Scotia Premier and federal Senator Harold Connolly and his wife Vivian. She was educated at Dalhousie University, Smith College, Georgetown University, and the University of Calgary.

== Alberta politics ==
She later moved to Western Canada, and was an unsuccessful Liberal candidate for Calgary-Elbow in the 1975 Alberta provincial election. She served as President of the Alberta Liberal Party between 1975 and 1977, and was on the national executive of the Liberal Party of Canada in the same period.

== Manitoba Liberal leader ==
Carstairs became leader of the Manitoba Liberal Party in 1984, at a time when the party held no seats in the legislature. She came second to Progressive Conservative candidate Charlie Birt in a 1984 by-election in the south Winnipeg electoral district of Fort Garry, but was elected for the central Winnipeg district of River Heights in the 1986 provincial election, defeating incumbent Tory Warren Steen. For the next two years, she was the only Liberal in the legislature.

Carstairs led the Liberal Party to a dramatic resurgence in the 1988 provincial election, which saw the New Democratic Party of Manitoba under Howard Pawley reduced from government to third party status, and the election of a Progressive Conservative minority government under Gary Filmon. Carstairs' Liberals won 20 of 57 seats for their best showing since 1953, largely by drawing many centre-left voters from the NDP. Carstairs became leader of the opposition, the first woman to hold such a position in any Canadian legislature.

Having led the party out of almost 20 years in the political wilderness, it initially seemed that Carstairs had a strong opportunity to lead the Liberals to victory in the following election. Had she done so, she would have become the first woman elected in her own right as a provincial premier in Canada. The 1990 election, however, saw the Tories returned with a majority government and a resurgent NDP under Gary Doer regain official opposition status. The Liberals were reduced to only seven seats. Many Liberals felt Carstairs had squandered their best chance in three decades to form government.

A strong opponent of the Meech Lake Accord, Carstairs remained party leader and, in 1992, campaigned for the "No" side on the Charlottetown Accord, with financial assistance from former party leader Israel Asper. Her efforts were opposed by others in the Liberal Party, and she frequently argued with Lloyd Axworthy on constitutional matters. Carstairs resigned as party leader in 1993 and was succeeded by MLA Paul Edwards. The party has continued to decline since her departure, and has never come anywhere near as close to winning government as it did in 1988; it has only briefly held official party status for slightly more than a year in 2018–19 since.

In 1993, Carstairs published an autobiography entitled Not One of the Boys.

== Senate ==
On September 15, 1994, at the recommendation of Prime Minister Jean Chrétien, Governor General Ray Hnatyshyn appointed Carstairs to the Senate of Canada. Carstairs had supported Chrétien's campaign to become party leader in 1990.

She held the position of Leader of the Government in the Senate from January 2001 to December 2003, and also served as Minister with Special Responsibility for Palliative Care in Chretien's cabinet. She did not serve in the cabinet of Chretien's successor, Paul Martin, when he took office in December 2003.

From April 2006 until December 2009, Carstairs continued her earlier work in cabinet by serving as chairperson of the Special Committee on Aging which issued a report that helped get palliative care added to the core curriculum in Canadian medical schools. She also helped create the Canadian Virtual Hospice, a website with information on palliative care.

== Retirement ==
In October 2011, Carstairs announced she was resigning from the Senate to return to private life; she was then 69 years old, five and a half years shy of the mandatory retirement age of 75.

In retirement, she and her husband intended to remain in Ottawa to be close to their children. Carstairs became chair of the board for a network centre of excellence on caring for the frail elderly, pending the approval of a grant from the federal government.

In 2015, the Royal Canadian Mounted Police investigated her expenses that she had submitted to the Senate as part of the Canadian Senate expenses scandal but did not lay charges.

== Honours and awards ==
On June 30, 2016, Carstairs was made a Member of the Order of Canada by Governor General David Johnston for "her public service and her work as a champion of palliative care."

26th Canadian Ministry (1993–2003) – Cabinet of Jean Chrétien
Cabinet post (1)
Predecessor	Office	Successor
Bernie Boudreau	Leader of the Government in the Senate; 2001–2003	Jack Austin
