= Neil Gaudry =

Canadian politician

Neil Gaudry (September 19, 1937 – February 18, 1999) was a politician in Manitoba, Canada. He was a member of the Legislative Assembly of Manitoba from 1988 until his death, sitting as a Liberal.

The son of Véronique Chartrand and Ernest Gaudry, he was born in St. Laurent, Manitoba and was educated there. In 1962, he married Leona Rainville. Before entering public life, Gaudry worked as an accountant and office manager. He was the secretary-treasurer of Malcolm Construction Ltd. for twenty-five years, and was active in the community of Interlake before moving to Winnipeg in his later years.

Gaudry was first elected to the Manitoba legislature in the provincial election of 1988, in the Winnipeg riding of St. Boniface. This historically francophone riding had been represented by Laurent Desjardins almost continuously since 1959; originally a Liberal, Desjardins crossed to the New Democratic Party in 1969 and was re-elected four times under that party's banner. Desjardins retired in 1988 when the Manitoba NDP was experiencing a sharp decline in popularity, and Gaudry recaptured St. Boniface for the Liberals with 61 percent of the vote of the vote. The election was won by the Progressive Conservatives, and Gaudry joined 19 other Liberals in the official opposition.

Gaudry was easily elected again in the 1990 election, with only a slightly reduced plurality. His share of the popular vote fell to below 50% in the provincial election of 1995, but he was still re-elected by a nearly 2-to-1 margin over the NDP, despite the Liberals winning only two other seats in the rest of the province.

The Manitoba Liberal Party experienced internal divisions in 1997, due to disgruntlement with the leadership of Ginny Hasselfield. At one stage, Kevin Lamoureux and Gary Kowalski broke from the official party caucus to sit as Independent Liberals; Gaudry was the only Liberal MLA to continue supporting the official party leadership during this period.

Neil Gaudry died of a heart attack on February 18, 1999, while attending the Festival du Voyageur in St. Boniface and the legislature passed a motion of condolence in his memory on April 26 of the same year.

Gaudry frequently championed francophone causes during his time in the legislature. He sought to have Louis Riel recognized as a Father of Confederation, and was an active member in l'Assemblee internationale des parlementaires de la langue francaise. Despite partisan differences, he also assisted the Progressive Conservative government of Gary Filmon on matters relating to francophone education.

== Election results ==
1988 Manitoba general election: St. Boniface
Party	Candidate	Votes	%	±%
Liberal	Neil Gaudry	5,743	61.16	+37.34
New Democratic	Lorette Beaudry-Ferland	2,061	21.95	-38.82
Progressive Conservative	Guy Savoie	1,586	16.89	+3.29
Total valid votes		9,390	100.00	-
Rejected ballots			–	–
Turnout				
Eligible voters				
Source: Elections Manitoba

1990 Manitoba general election: St. Boniface
Party	Candidate	Votes	%	±%
Liberal	Neil Gaudry	4,928	55.40	-5.76
New Democratic	Robert Gooding	2,046	23.00	+1.05
Progressive Conservative	Henri Marcoux	1,921	21.60	-0.35
Total valid votes		8,895	100.00	-
Rejected ballots			–	
Turnout				
Eligible voters				
Source: Elections Manitoba

1995 Manitoba general election: St. Boniface
Party	Candidate	Votes	%	±%	Expenditures
Liberal	Neil Gaudry	4,021	45.48	-9.92	
New Democratic	Rachel Massicotte	2,829	32.00	+9.00	
Progressive Conservative	Kim F. Sigurdson	1,686	19.07	-2.53	
Independent	Yvan Lecuyer	306	3.46	n/a	
Total valid votes		8,883	100.00		
Rejected and declined ballots		41			
Turnout		8,924	71.3		
Electors on the lists		12,459			
