= 2006 Progressive Conservative Party of Manitoba leadership election =

The Progressive Conservative Party of Manitoba chose new leader Hugh McFadyen following the resignation of Stuart Murray on November 14, 2005. The Progressive Conservatives had been in opposition since losing the 1999 provincial election.

== Timeline ==
- November 5, 2005 – Only 55% of delegates endorse the leadership of Stuart Murray at the PC annual convention. Murray calls for a leadership race.
- November 14, 2005 – Murray announces he will not be a candidate to succeed himself in the leadership election.
- February 23, 2006 – Brian Pallister rejects a bid for the leadership of the party.
- February 23, 2006 – Hugh McFadyen becomes the first to declare as he announces his bid for the leadership of the party.
- February 24, 2006 – Ron Schuler announces his bid for the leadership of the party.
- February 27, 2006 – Ken Waddell announces his bid for the leadership of the party.
- April 29, 2006 – McFadyen wins the leadership.

== Results ==
Candidate	Votes	
Candidate	#	%
Hugh McFadyen	6,091	67
Ron Schuler	1,953	21
Ken Waddell	1,099	12

== Non candidates ==
- Jim Downey, former Deputy Premier and minister of various portfolios
- Myrna Driedger, member of the Legislative Assembly for Charleswood
- David Faurschou, member of the Legislative Assembly for Portage la Prairie.
- David Lantry, former candidate and Chief of Staff to Stuart Murray. Announced he was considering running, but never filed papers.
- Stuart Murray, the incumbent leader called the race due to a poor showing in a leadership review but spent over a week pondering another run before deciding against it.
- Brian Pallister, former minister of Government Services and current member of the federal parliament for Portage-Lisgar. Ruled himself out two weeks after the federal election.
