= Manitoba Liberal Party candidates in the 1999 Manitoba provincial election =

One member of the Manitoba Liberal Party was elected to the Legislative Assembly of Manitoba in the 1999 provincial election. Some of the party's candidates have their own biography pages; information about others may be found here.

This page also provides information for candidates in by-elections between 1999 and 2003.

== Candidates ==
Riding	Candidate name	Notes	Residence	Occupation	Votes	%	Rank
Arthur-Virden	Bob Brigden	Brigden is a farmer near Melita, Manitoba. He was elected as a councillor in the Rural Municipality of Brenda in 1998, and was the first declared candidate for the 1999 Progressive Conservative nomination in Arthur-Virden. He later withdrew from that contest, and sought and won the Liberal Party nomination instead. Newspaper accounts do not indicate why he changed parties in the buildup to the campaign. Brigden did not stand for re-election to council in 2002.	Melita, Manitoba	Farmer	1,281	14.97	3rd
Assiniboia	J. Deborah Shiloff	Shiloff is a neuroscientist, a Scientific Support Officer at the National Research Council of Canada's Winnipeg Institute for Biodiagnostics, and a member of the Neuroethics New Emerging Team (NET). She received 1,136 votes (11.56%) in the 1999 election, finishing third against New Democratic Party candidate Jim Rondeau.		neuroscientist and Scientific Support Officer	1,136	11.56	3rd
Brandon East	Peter Logan	Logan has campaigned for Brandon City Council on two occasions. He sold computerized cash register systems in 1999, and could not campaign full-time until the last two weeks of the election. He later became president of the federal Liberal Party riding association in Brandon—Souris, and was one of Paul Martin's nominators for the party leadership in 2003. Logan supported Michael Ignatieff's leadership bid in 2006.		Point of Sale System Salesperson	453	5.74	4th
Brandon West	Lisa Roy	Roy (now Lisa Blixhavn) is a teacher, and an active curler. She led the 1998 Manitoba women's junior champions team at the 1998 Canadian Junior Curling Championships in Calgary, Alberta, and was a member of the runner-up team in the 2005 women's provincial curling championship. She has remained active in the sport after suffering a serious eye injury in a 2005 accident. Roy was a university student during the 1999 campaign. She received 407 votes (4.09%), finishing third against New Democratic Party candidate Scott Smith.		Teacher and Curler	407	4.09	3rd
Burrows	Mike Babinsky				1,849	23.81	2nd
Carman	Raymond Le Neal				2,291	30.24	2nd
Charleswood	Alana McKenzie				2,323	23.38	2nd
Concordia	Chris Hlady	Hlady has a Bachelor of Fine Arts from the University of Manitoba. He has been a comic book illustrator, and has done video work. He received 444 votes (5.47%) in 1999, finishing third against New Democratic Party leader Gary Doer.		Comic Book Illustrator and Videographer	444	5.47	3rd
Dauphin–Roblin	No Candidate	–	–	–	0	–	–
Elmwood	No Candidate	–	–	–	0	–	–
Emerson	Ted Klassen				2,054	27.83	2nd
Flin Flon	No Candidate	–	–	–	0	–	–
Fort Garry	Ted Gilson				1,143	11.32	3rd
Fort Rouge	John Shanski				1,870	19.13	3rd
Fort Whyte	Malli Aulakh	Aulakh was one of five candidates for the federal Liberal Party nomination for Winnipeg South in 1993. He was eliminated after the first ballot and gave his support to rival candidate Reg Alcock, the eventual winner (WFP, 25 March 1993). He later attempted to challenge Kevin Lamoureux for the Winnipeg Centre Liberal nomination in 2000, but was unable to do so when the party ruled he had missed a filing deadline (WFP, 30 September 2000). He received 1,202 votes (11.45%) in the 1999 election, finishing third against Progressive Conservative John Loewen. In 2003, Aulakh was named to the board of directors of the Winnipeg Public Library (WFP, 24 March 2003).			1,202	11.45	3rd
Gimli	Pat Carroll				1,019	8.79	3rd
Inkster	Kevin Lamoureux				3,358	42.64	2nd
Interlake	Margaret Swan				770	9.82	3rd
Kildonan	Michael Lazar				1,093	11.23	3rd
Kirkfield Park	Vic Wieler	Wieler campaigned ran for the Manitoba legislature in the 1995 provincial election, and finished second against Progressive Conservative incumbent Eric Stefanson. He campaigned against Stefanson again in the 1999 election, and finished third. In 2000, he was nominated as that Liberal candidate for a by-election in Kirkfield Park against new Progressive Conservative Party Leader Stuart Murray. He finished second with 2,158 votes (26.64%). Previously a high-school principal, Wieler had become a financial planner by the time of the 2000 election. He was also president of the Rotary-Club of Winnipeg Assiniboine at the time of the by-election (Winnipeg Free Press, 11 May 2000). In 2003, he became a director of the Mennonite Central Committee's Furniture Thrift Store (Winnipeg Free Press, 12 November 2003).		High School Principal and Financial Planner	2,306	20.10	3rd
La Verendrye	Léon E. Morrissette				1,465	17.08	3rd
Lac du Bonnet	No Candidate	–	–	–	0	–	–
Lakeside	Dave Harcus				1,646	18.13	3rd
Lord Roberts	Allen Mills				1,776	17.96	3rd
Minnedosa	Gordon L. Powell				578	7.67	3rd
Minto	Duane Poettcker				452	6.37	3rd
Morris	Herm Martens				2,179	24.89	2nd
Pembina	Marilyn Skubovius				1,039	14.91	3rd
Point Douglas	Ajay Chopra	Chopra was awarded the National Indo-Canadian Council Distinguished Youth Entrepreneurship Award in 1998. He was 22 years old at the time of the 1999 election, and finished a credible second against New Democratic Party incumbent George Hickes with 1,336 votes (21.35%). Chopra was a special assistant to the federal Minister of Justice and Attorney General in 2002, and worked on Phil Fontaine's campaign to lead the Assembly of First Nations (AFN) in 2003. Although he is not himself aboriginal, Chopra currently serves as the AFN's intergovernmental affairs advisor.			1,336	21.35	2nd
Portage la Prairie	Dave Cook				1,116	14.94	3rd
Radisson	Betty Ann Watts	Watts was candidate for the Manitoba Liberal Party in two elections, 1999 in Radisson and 2003 in Transcona. Watts was a trustee in the Transcona-Springfield School Division from 1989 to 1998, and served as its chair prior to the 1998 municipal election (in which she was not a candidate). She supported greater parental involvement in school activities, and played an organizational role in Ukrainian language bilingualism programs. In 1996, she was elected chair of the Manitoba Multicultural Resources Centre. She has also worked as Managing Editor for The Cottager magazine, and coordinated the 2007 Magazines Mean Business conference.			1,136	12.02	3rd
Riel	Clayton Weselowski				820	7.92	3rd
River East	Patrick Saydak				688	6.86	3rd
River Heights	Jon Gerrard				5,173	45.00	1st
Rossmere	Cecilia Connelly	Connelly has been a frequent candidate for the Liberal Party in the Rossmere constituency. Her poor showing in 1999 may be explained by the fact that the New Democratic and Progressive Conservative parties were engaged in a tightly-fought contest, with both parties siphoning Liberal support.			396	3.82	3rd
Rupertsland	Darcy Wood				708	20.87	2nd
Russell	No Candidate	–	–	–	0	–	–
Seine River	Jake Pankratz				1,493	15.23	3rd
Selkirk	Joe Smolinski				1,162	11.75	3rd
Southdale	Shirley Chaput				2,064	19.36	3rd
Springfield	Patricia Aitken				771	7.71	3rd
St. Boniface	Jean Paul–Boily				2,994	31.14	2nd
St. James	Wayne Helgason				1,625	16.23	3rd
St. Johns	Patrick Fontaine				607	7.53	3rd
St. Norbert	Mohinder Dhillon				1,313	14.59	3rd
St. Vital	Lynn Clark				1,099	10.72	3rd
Ste. Rose	Fred Juskowiak				591	7.62	3rd
Steinbach	Rick Ginter				688	9.42	3rd
Swan River	No Candidate	–	–	–	0	–	–
The Maples	Sudhir Sandhu				1,233	15.42	3rd
The Pas	Don Sandberg				612	9.71	3rd
Thompson	Pascal Bighetty				244	4.57	3rd
Transcona	Vibart C. Stewart	Stewart and his wife helped supply replacement workers to the Tache Nursing Centre in 1996, at a time with the centre's employees were on strike. Vibart's wife, ironically, was herself one of the strikers. He received 713 votes (8.10%) in 1999, finishing third against New Democratic Party incumbent Daryl Reid.			713	8.10	3rd
Turtle Mountain	Lorne Hanks				1,247	17.35	3rd
Tuxedo	Rochelle Zimberg	Rochelle Zimberg has a master's degree in international relations theory. She was executive director of the Manitoba Association of Urban Municipalities during the 1990s, and argued in 1993 that the provincial Municipal Act was out of date and in need of revision. She later sought a balanced approach on the use of Video Lottery Terminal revenues by municipal governments. In 1997, she was appointed to an advisory committee overseeing the distribution of the Canadian Red Cross, Manitoba Flood Appeal Fund. She was inducted into the Federation of Canadian Municipalities Roll of Honour in 1999. Zimberg placed third against Manitoba Premier Gary Filmon in 1999. after the original Liberal candidate stood down from the contest. Ms Zimberg ran again in 2000 and came in second to conservative candidate Heather Stefanson.			1,391	14.19	3rd
Wellington	Bernie Doucette				757	12.66	3rd
Wolseley	No Candidate	–	–	–	0	–	–

== By-elections ==
Riding	Candidate name	By-election Date	Notes	Residence	Occupation	Votes	%	Rank
Kirkfield Park	Vic Wieler	November 21, 2000	Wieler campaigned ran for the Manitoba legislature in the 1995 provincial election, and finished second against Progressive Conservative incumbent Eric Stefanson. He campaigned against Stefanson again in the 1999 election, and finished third. In 2000, he was nominated as that Liberal candidate for a by-election in Kirkfield Park against new Progressive Conservative Party Leader Stuart Murray. He finished second with 2,158 votes (26.64%). Previously a high-school principal, Wieler had become a financial planner by the time of the 2000 election. He was also president of the Rotary-Club of Winnipeg Assiniboine at the time of the by-election (Winnipeg Free Press, 11 May 2000). In 2003, he became a director of the Mennonite Central Committee's Furniture Thrift Store (Winnipeg Free Press, 12 November 2003).		High school Principal and Financial Planner	2,158	26.64	2nd
Tuxedo	Rochelle Zimberg	November 21, 2000	Rochelle Zimberg has a master's degree in international relations theory. She was executive director of the Manitoba Association of Urban Municipalities during the 1990s, and argued in 1993 that the provincial Municipal Act was out of date and in need of revision. She later sought a balanced approach on the use of Video Lottery Terminal revenues by municipal governments. In 1997, she was appointed to an advisory committee overseeing the distribution of the Canadian Red Cross, Manitoba Flood Appeal Fund. She was inducted into the Federation of Canadian Municipalities Roll of Honour in 1999. Zimberg placed third against Manitoba Premier Gary Filmon in 1999. after the original Liberal candidate stood down from the contest. Ms Zimberg ran again in 2000 and came in second to conservative candidate Heather Stefanson.			1,586	25.61	2nd
Lac du Bonnet	George William Harbottle	March 12, 2002				1,647	19.89	3rd
