= Libertarian Party of Manitoba candidates in the 1999 Manitoba provincial election =

Listing of candidates

The Libertarian Party of Manitoba ran six candidates in the 1999 provincial election, none of whom were elected. Some of these candidates have their own biography pages; information about others may be found on this page.

== Cameron Neumann (Elmwood) ==
Neumann received 320 votes (3.89%), finishing third against New Democratic Party incumbent Jim Maloway.

== Gary Bergen (Portage La Prairie) ==
Bergen received 111 votes.

== Dennis Rice (Morris) ==
Rice received 107 votes.

== Chris Buors (Rossmere) ==
Buors received 62 votes.

== Clancy Smith (River Heights) ==
Smith received 30 votes.

== Didz Zuzens (Minto) ==
Zuzens received 26 votes.
