= Duncan Edmonds =

Canadian businessman and politician (1936–2019)

- Born: 1936; Toronto, Ontario, Canada
- Died: August 23, 2019 (aged 79–80)
- Education: University of Toronto
- Occupations: businessman, politician, consultant, lobbyist, university professor, writer

Duncan Edmonds was a Canadian businessman, politician, consultant, lobbyist, university professor, and writer. In 1969, he unsuccessfully ran for the leadership of the Manitoba Liberal Party.

== Life and career ==
Edmonds was born in Toronto, Ontario, and received a Bachelor of Arts degree from the University of Toronto in 1959. He began doctorate studies at the London School of Economics. He left his graduate studies, never to return, to take a job in Ottawa as an executive assistant in the office of Liberal Opposition Leader Lester Pearson, the future Prime Minister. He next worked as a professor of political studies at Carleton University and became a Dean of Residence at Carleton. He played a major role in organizing the Company of Young Canadians in 1965. He also worked for CUSO, and for Crossroads Africa in the 1960s. From 1963 to 1966 he was Executive Assistant to Paul Martin Sr. in the Department of External Affairs and he chaired Paul Martin Sr.'s unsuccessful leadership campaign in 1968.

Although Edmonds had no legislative experience, he was the primary opposition to Robert Bend at the 1969 Liberal convention. Some youth delegates were seen burning their membership cards after Bend's victory was announced. Edmonds ran in the Winnipeg-area riding of Charleswood in the 1969 provincial election but lost to Progressive Conservative candidate Arthur Moug by over a thousand votes.

Edmonds retired from active politics after this loss. He worked as a consultant and lobbyist in Ottawa during much of the 1970s, first on his own, and then as a co-founder of the firm Public Affairs International, along with Torrance Wylie.

With PAI a success, Edmonds then took a job as senior policy advisor to federal Progressive Conservative leader Joe Clark in 1977. Edmonds developed advanced concepts around free trade in North America, but Clark did not pursue this initiative. Edmonds left this job after one year, to return to consulting work with his own firm. The free trade ideas developed by Edmonds would have to wait another decade, for Brian Mulroney's rule, to become reality. Clark became Prime Minister in 1979 but was defeated in 1980; during that time, Edmonds continued to advise Clark on an informal basis.

Edmonds returned as a senior policy adviser to Defence Minister Robert Coates when the Tories regained power in September 1984. However, Coates had to resign in early 1985 over an ill-advised visit to a strip club in West Germany while on official business; this escapade constituted a security risk. Edmonds reported the details of this and other matters to senior Canadian civil servants. Mulroney was annoyed that Edmonds had acted as a whistle-blower on Coates, and blacklisted Edmonds from government. This scandal, so soon after the Mulroney government had taken power, foreshadowed the many Tory scandals to come in the years ahead.

Edmonds continued to work in the field of international development, and wrote a book on Canada-United States relations in the mid-1980s. He served as a professor and Chairman of Canadian Studies at Yale University from 1986 to 1988. He was later named Vice Chairman of the McRae Group of Companies, a real estate and development firm based in Arizona and California.

Duncan Edmonds died on August 23, 2019.
