= Linda Asper =

Canadian politician

Member of the Legislative Assembly of Manitoba for Riel
- In office September 21, 1999 – April 24, 2003
- Preceded by: David Neuman
- Succeeded by: Christine Melnick

Personal details
- Born: December 1, 1943 (age 82)

Linda Asper (born 1 December 1943) is a politician in Manitoba, Canada. She joined the Liberal Party and then later returned to the New Democratic Party during the 1990s. She was a member of the Manitoba legislature from 1999 to 2003.

== Early life ==
Asper holds a Ph.D. in education, and had an extensive career as an educator before entering political life. She was a Winnipeg school trustee for the Seine River division, and served as president of the Manitoba Teachers' Society and vice-president of the Canadian Teachers' Federation for a period of time. Asper was also a member of the Faculty Council of the University of Manitoba, and served on the board of governors at St. Boniface College. In addition to her career in education, she was a member of the Manitoba Action Committee on the Status of Women.

== Political career ==
In the 1990 provincial election, Asper ran as a Liberal in the south Winnipeg riding of Niakwa. She was defeated by Progressive Conservative candidate Jack Reimer by 4,950 votes to 4,301.

By 1999, Asper had crossed over to the New Democratic Party. In that year's provincial election, she was elected as a New Democratic for the Winnipeg riding of Riel, defeating Progressive Conservative incumbent David Newman 4,833 votes to 4,559.

== Post-political career ==
In April 2003, Asper announced that she was leaving politics to take a position with Education International an advocacy group based in Brussels, Belgium. She now promotes the rights of both children and educators on an international level, and has been a vocal opponent of child labour practices.

== Personal life ==
Linda Asper was the sister-in-law of the late Israel Asper.

== Electoral record ==
1999 Manitoba general election: Riel
| Party | Candidate | Votes | % | ±% | Expenditures |
|---|---|---|---|---|---|
| New Democratic | Linda Asper | 4,883 | 46.68 | | $20,612.00 |
| Progressive Conservative | David Newman | 4,559 | 44.03 | | $27,412.91 |
| Liberal | Clayton Weselowski | 820 | 7.92 | – | $3,179.52 |
| Manitoba | Mike Kubara | 91 | 0.88 | | $3,179.52 |
| Total valid votes | | 10,303 | 99.35 | | |
| Rejected and declined votes | | 51 | 0.65 | | |
| Turnout | | 10,354 | 76.08 | | |
| Registered voters | | 13,610 | | | |
Source: Elections Manitoba
