= Kevin Klein =

Kevin Klein may refer to:

- Kevin Klein (ice hockey)
- Kevin Klein (politician)

== See also ==
- Kevin Kline, American actor
