= Leadership review =

Party convention event in Canada politics

In Canadian politics, a leadership review is a vote held at a political party convention in which delegates decide whether to endorse the incumbent party leader or schedule a leadership convention to elect a new leader. In most parties at present, such a vote is required at the first convention following a general election.

Officially, a new leadership election is only required if the incumbent leader fails to receive support from a simple majority of delegates (or if a motion to hold a leadership election passes by one vote). In practice, leaders who do not win the review by a substantial margin are expected to call a leadership election and either re-offer or resign altogether.

The term also refers to reviews under the Reform Act, in which the party caucuses in the House of Commons decide on whether to retain the leader.

== History ==
Traditionally, in most Canadian political parties, there was no mechanism for a political party to forcibly remove an incumbent leader. This changed in the late 1960s as a result of a grassroots revolt within the Progressive Conservative Party of Canada against the leadership of John G. Diefenbaker after leading the party to two successive electoral defeats. Party president Dalton Camp agitated for the right of the party to hold a leadership review. In 1966, Camp ran for re-election as party president declaring that if he was returned to the position, he would call a leadership convention for 1967. Camp was handily re-elected, and the party passed a motion to hold a leadership convention by the end of 1967. In January 1967, Diefenbaker acquiesced and asked the party executive to call a leadership convention "at the earliest possible date". Diefenbaker stood as a candidate in the September 1967 convention and was defeated by Robert Stanfield. Subsequently, the Progressive Conservatives instituted a constitutional requirement that a leadership review be held at every party convention.

In January 1983, Progressive Conservative leader Joe Clark voluntarily called the leadership election for later that year after winning the support of only 66.9% of delegates at a leadership review. He ran in the election but was defeated by Brian Mulroney. Subsequently, the party altered its rules so that a mandatory leadership review would only occur at the first convention following a general election rather than at every convention. Since then, 66% has been considered an informal benchmark for leaders to surpass in order to avoid calling a leadership election.

The Liberal Party of Canada has a similar provision for leadership reviews. A review scheduled for 2002 became the focal point in Paul Martin's efforts to unseat sitting prime minister Jean Chrétien; Chrétien was forced to step down once it became evident that he would lose the review. The Liberals, like the Conservatives, currently only mandate a review following an election loss.

The New Democratic Party had used a system in which the leader ran for re-election at every convention; however, no federal NDP leader had ever faced a serious challenge under this system and was usually acclaimed. After instituting a one member, one vote leadership election system in 2003, the NDP also adopted the leadership review mechanism. At such a vote held on April 10, 2016 at the NDP's federal convention in Edmonton, incumbent leader Thomas Mulcair lost a leadership review vote when only 48% of delegates supported his continued leadership.

The Conservatives have also adopted a mechanism, provided by the Reform Act, where the parliamentary caucus can vote to remove a party leader; these are also referred to as leadership reviews. In February 2022, a Reform Act leadership review resulted in the ouster of Erin O'Toole.

On January 30, 2026, the Conservative Party of Canada leadership review took place in Calgary, with 87.4% of delegates voting in favour of Pierre Poilievre's continued leadership of the CPC.

=== Provincial politics ===
Provincial political parties also use leadership reviews. The 2006 Manitoba Progressive Conservative leadership election was called by party leader Stuart Murray after he received only 55% support in a leadership review.

In March 2006, Alberta Progressive Conservative Premier Ralph Klein received the endorsement of only 55% of delegates in a leadership review, leading to his resignation. His two successors, Ed Stelmach and Alison Redford, also faced contentious leadership reviews (in 2009 and 2013, respectively), but both received 77% support and were able to stay on.

In February 2008, Ontario Progressive Conservative leader John Tory received the support of 66.8% of delegates at a leadership review, after losing the 2007 general election and failing to win a seat. He remained as leader, only resigning the following year.

In May 2022, Alberta United Conservative Premier Jason Kenney received the support of 51.4% of members in a leadership review, after which he announced his resignation.

In November 2024, Alberta Premier Danielle Smith won a leadership review by UCP membership with 91.5% of the vote.

In September 2025, Ontario Liberal leader Bonnie Crombie faced a leadership review at the party’s annual general meeting. Delegates voted 57 per cent against holding a new leadership race, just over the 50 per cent threshold required by the party’s constitution for Crombie to remain leader. Crombie initially said she would stay on but hours later, following a caucus revolt, announced she would resign. She will remain leader until a successor is chosen.

== See also ==
- Leadership spill, a mechanism for removing party leaders in Australian politics
