= 2022 Kirkfield Park provincial by-election =

By-election

← 2019	December 13, 2022	2023 →

Riding of Kirkfield Park
- Turnout: 36.48%
	First party	Second party	Third party
Candidate	Kevin Klein	Logan Oxenham	Rhonda Nichol
Party	Progressive Conservative	New Democratic	Liberal
Popular vote	2,356	2,196	1,741
Percentage	37.03%	34.51%	27.36%
Swing	▼13.33%	▲8.83%	▲11.69%
- A map of Winnipeg's provincial ridings, showing Kirkfield Park highlighted in red.
MLA before election
Scott Fielding
Progressive Conservative
Elected MLA
Kevin Klein
Progressive Conservative

The 2022 Kirkfield Park provincial by-election was held on December 13, 2022.

== Background ==
The by-election was triggered after MLA Scott Fielding resigned from the Legislative Assembly and Executive Council of Manitoba. The election date was set on November 23, 2022.

Kevin Klein was declared the winner of the election.

== Candidates ==
Four candidates registered:

- Logan Oxenham – New Democratic Party of Manitoba
- Kevin Klein – Progressive Conservative Party of Manitoba
- Rhonda Nichol – Manitoba Liberal Party
- Dennis Bayomi – Green Party of Manitoba

== Results ==
Advance voting began on December 3.

Manitoba provincial by-election, December 13, 2022: Kirkfield Park Resignation of Scott Fielding
Party	Candidate	Votes	%	±%	Expenditures
Progressive Conservative	Kevin Klein	2,357	37.04	–13.32	
New Democratic	Logan Oxenham	2,196	34.51	+8.82	
Liberal	Rhonda Nichol	1,741	27.36	+11.68	
Green	Dennis Bayomi	70	1.10	–7.19	
Total valid votes		6,364	99.86		
Total rejected ballots		11	0.17	–0.58	
Turnout		6,375	36.50	–24.75	
Eligible voters		17,468			
Progressive Conservative hold		Swing		–11.07	
Source: Elections Manitoba

== Previous results ==
2019 Manitoba general election
Party	Candidate	Votes	%	±%	Expenditures
Progressive Conservative	Scott Fielding	5,445	50.36	–1.8	$48,691.89
New Democratic	Kurt Morton	2,777	25.68	–4.5	$2,920.83
Liberal	Ernie Nathaniel	1,695	15.68	+6.2	$4,443.68
Green	Dennis Bayomi	896	8.29	+0.4	$0.00
Total valid votes		10,813	99.25		
Total rejected ballots		82	0.75		
Turnout		10,895	61.25		
Eligible voters		17,789			
Progressive Conservative hold		Swing		+1.3	

^ Change is from redistributed results
