= Logan Oxenham =

Canadian politician

Logan Oxenham MLA

Member of the Legislative Assembly of Manitoba for Kirkfield Park
- Incumbent
- Assumed office October 3, 2023
- Preceded by: Kevin Klein

Personal details
- Party: New Democratic
- Children: 1
- Occupation: Juvenile correctional officer and Counsellor

Logan Jax Oxenham is a Canadian politician, who was elected to the Legislative Assembly of Manitoba in the 2023 Manitoba general election. He represents the district of Kirkfield Park as a member of the Manitoba New Democratic Party.

He previously ran in the district in the 2022 by-election, losing narrowly to Kevin Klein.

He is Canada's first transgender politician elected to either a provincial, territorial or federal elected office. Fellow New Democrat Uzoma Asagwara, elected in 2019, is non-binary and preceded him as the first non-cisgender MLA in Manitoba.

Prior to being elected, he was a juvenile correctional officer and counsellor at the Manitoba Youth Centre.

== Electoral history ==
2023 Manitoba general election: Kirkfield Park
Party	Candidate	Votes	%	±%	Expenditures
New Democratic	Logan Oxenham	5,067	44.55	+18.87	$23,228.82
Progressive Conservative	Kevin Klein	4,406	38.74	-11.62	$59,804.69
Liberal	Rhonda Nichol	1,696	14.91	-0.76	$13,290.09
Green	Dennis Bayomi	205	1.80	-6.48	$2,776.31
Total valid votes/expense limit		11,374	99.63	–	$69,804.00
Total rejected and declined ballots		42	0.37	–	
Turnout		11,416	63.76	+2.51	
Eligible voters		17,906			
New Democratic gain from Progressive Conservative		Swing		+15.24	
Source(s) Source: Elections Manitoba

Manitoba provincial by-election, December 13, 2022: Kirkfield Park Resignation of Scott Fielding
Party	Candidate	Votes	%	±%	Expenditures
Progressive Conservative	Kevin Klein	2,357	37.04	-13.32	
New Democratic	Logan Oxenham	2,196	34.51	+8.82	
Liberal	Rhonda Nichol	1,741	27.36	+11.68	
Green	Dennis Bayomi	70	1.10	-7.19	
Total valid votes		6,364	99.86		
Total rejected ballots		11	0.17	-0.58	
Turnout		6,375	36.50	-24.75	
Eligible voters		17,468			
Progressive Conservative hold		Swing		-11.07	
Source: Elections Manitoba
