= Reform Act (Canada) =

2014 federal law on parliamentary reform

Reform Act, 2014

Parliament of Canada
- Long title: An Act to amend the Canada Elections Act and the Parliament of Canada Act (candidacy and caucus reforms)
- Citation: SC 2015, c. 37
- Considered by: House of Commons of Canada
- Considered by: Senate of Canada
- Assented to: June 23, 2015
- Commenced: October 26, 2015

Legislative history

First chamber: House of Commons of Canada
- Bill citation: Bill C-586
- Introduced by: Michael Chong
- First reading: April 7, 2014
- Second reading: September 24, 2014
- Third reading: September 25, 2014

Second chamber: Senate of Canada
- First reading: February 25, 2015
- Second reading: May 14, 2015
- Third reading: June 22, 2015

Related legislation
- Canada Elections Act, SC 2000, c. 9 Parliament of Canada Act, RSC 1985, c. P-1
- Status: In force

The Reform Act, 2014 (French: Loi de 2014 instituant des réformes) is legislation enacted by the Parliament of Canada on June 23, 2015, that amended the Parliament of Canada Act, and the Canada Elections Act to increase the power and independence of MPs. The act was championed as a private members bill by Conservative MP Michael Chong. It passed the House of Commons by a vote of 260–17 on February 25, 2015 and the Senate by a vote of 38–14, after attempts by Conservative senators to kill the legislation failed.

== Procedures ==
The Act amended the Canada Elections Act to require each party to designate a person or entity to approve the nominations of candidates. The original version of the bill would have stripped the party leader of the power to approve nominations, but that portion of the bill was watered down as a compromise so it could pass the House of Commons; as a result, the new provisions for approving candidacies still allow for parties to vest that power into the leader.

The Act also amended the Parliament of Canada Act to create four sets of provisions relating to:

- The expulsion/readmission of caucus members;
- The election and removal of the caucus chair;
- The removal of the party leader;
- The election of an interim leader.

At their first caucus meeting following an election, the membership of each recognized party in the House of Commons votes on whether any or all of the sets should apply to their caucuses. The provisions only applying to the caucuses that approve them was another compromise to ensure passage of the Act. The approval of the provisions by the caucuses is binding until Parliament dissolves, after which another vote is held.

The set of the provisions relating to the expulsion/readmission of caucus members are sections 49.2 and 49.3 of the Parliament of Canada Act. And declare that no member of a caucus may be expelled from it unless a majority of the members of that caucus vote to expel them in a secret ballot, the secret ballot is held after 20% of the members of the caucus sign a petition calling for the members' expulsion and deliver it to the caucus chair. The expelled member may be readmitted if either they win the next election as a candidate of the party, or if a majority of the caucus approves their re-admission in a secret ballot following a similar petition.

Section 49.4 provides for the election and removal of the caucus chair, declaring that after a general election, or if a vacancy arises in the office, the caucus must select a new caucus chair by majority vote in a secret ballot. It likewise provides for the removal of a caucus chair if a petition signed by at least 20% of the members of the caucus is delivered to them, and a majority of the caucus then votes to remove them via secret ballot. 49.4 also states that for any votes to elect or remove a caucus chair, the most senior MP in the caucus must preside.

Section 49.5 provides for a leadership review should a petition calling for one, signed by at least 20% of the caucus members, be delivered to the chair, who must immediately make the contents of the petition public. During a leadership review, MPs in the caucus vote through a secret ballot on whether the leader should be retained, and they are removed if a majority vote in favour of their dismissal. Subsection 49.5(4) and section 49.6 provide for the election of an interim leader following a vacancy in the position of leader, who serves until a permanent replacement is selected by the party through its own procedures.

== Usage ==
The caucus member ejection provisions were first used when the Conservative caucus voted to eject Derek Sloan on January 20, 2021.

In February 2022, the leadership removal provisions were invoked for the first time by the Conservative caucus following the 2021 election, which used it to trigger a leadership review against, and remove, Erin O'Toole. During the review, 45 MPs voted to retain him against 73 who voted for his removal. Deputy Leader Candice Bergen was selected as interim leader. O'Toole's removal marked the first time since the Reform Act was passed into law seven years prior that a party caucus formally challenged and dismissed its leader.
