= Sharon Blady =

Canadian politician

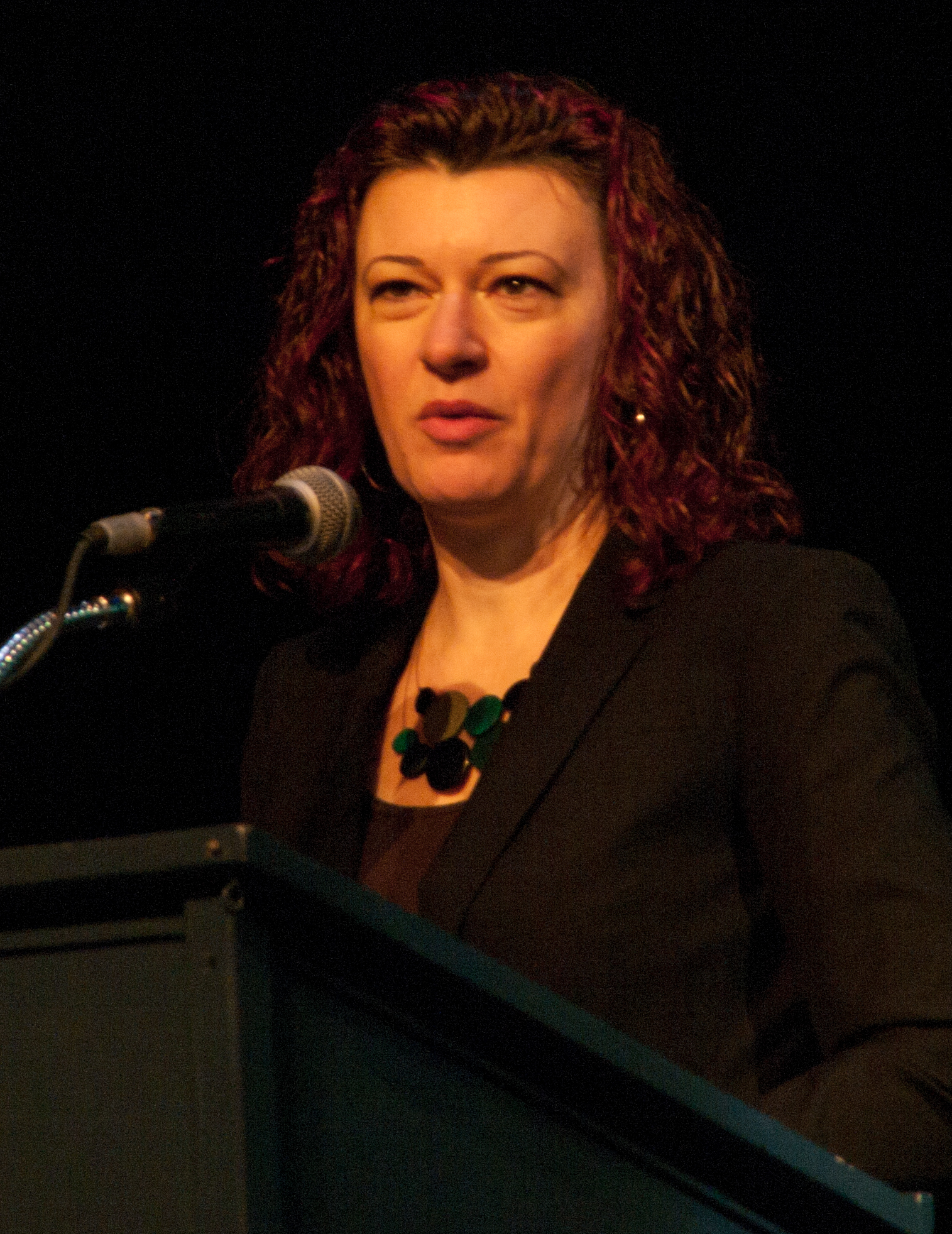
- Blady in 2014

Manitoba Minister of Health
- In office November 3, 2014 – May 3, 2016
- Premier: Greg Selinger
- Preceded by: Erin Selby
- Succeeded by: Kelvin Goertzen

Manitoba Minister of Healthy Living and Seniors
- In office October 18, 2013 – November 3, 2014
- Premier: Greg Selinger
- Preceded by: new portfolio
- Succeeded by: Deanne Crothers

Member of the Legislative Assembly of Manitoba for Kirkfield Park
- In office May 22, 2007 – April 19, 2016
- Preceded by: Stuart Murray
- Succeeded by: Scott Fielding

Personal details
- Party: New Democratic Party
- Education: University of Manitoba (BA); University of Victoria (MA)
- Occupation: University instructor
- Website: sharonblady.ca

Sharon Anne Blady /ˈbleɪdi/ is a former provincial politician in the Canadian province of Manitoba. She was elected to the Legislative Assembly of Manitoba in the 2007 provincial election in the constituency of Kirkfield Park. She was defeated in the 2016 provincial election. Blady is a member of the New Democratic Party. Prior to her election, she was an instructor of social work and native studies at the University of Manitoba.

== Early life and career ==
Blady grew up in the neighbourhood of St. James-Assiniboia in Winnipeg, Manitoba, where she attended Buchanan School, Hedges Junior High School, and Collège Silver Heights Collegiate. She received a Bachelor of Arts in anthropology, art history, and architecture from the University of Manitoba in 1991. She received a Master of Arts in history in art and native studies from the University of Victoria in 1995 with her thesis entitled The Flower Beadwork People: Factors Contributing to the Emergence of Distinctive Métis Cultural Artistic Style at Red River from 1844 to 1869. In 1996 and 1997, two papers of hers about Métis culture and history were published by the Canadian Circumpolar Institute at the University of Alberta as part of Issues in the North.

Blady designed and taught introductory courses in gender and women's studies and visual and Aboriginal art studies at Brandon University. She later taught at the University of Manitoba in its Joint Baccalaureate Nursing program and its Inner City Social Work program.

== Political career ==
Sharon Blady was first elected to the Legislative Assembly of Manitoba in the 2007 provincial election on May 22, 2007. As the New Democratic Party candidate, she won the traditionally Progressive Conservative electoral division of Kirkfield Park with a margin of over 11%.

Blady was appointed minister's assistant for tenant issues to the Minister of Family Services and Consumer Affairs, Gord Mackintosh, on June 24, 2010. On April 4, 2011, she was promoted to the position of legislative assistant to the minister. She has also sat on a number of committees of the Legislative Assembly including the Standing Committees on Agriculture and Food (as the vice-chairperson), Crown Corporations (as the chairperson), Legislative Affairs (as the chairperson), Private Bills, Public Accounts, and Social and Economic Development (as the vice-chairperson) and the Special Committee on Senate Reform.

During her first term in the legislature, Blady introduced two private member's bills which passed. In 2009, she introduced Bill 238, The Service Animals Protection Act, which made it an offence to interfere with or allow another animal to interfere with guide dogs or other service animals without the permission of its owner. The bill passed third reading on September 23, 2009, and was granted royal assent on October 8, 2009. Through this bill, Manitoba became the first jurisdiction in Canada to specifically legislate the protection of service animals. The legislation has been praised by the Manitoba Human Rights Commission.

On April 19, 2011, Blady introduced Bill 217, The Residential Tenancies Amendment Act (Expanded Grounds for Early Termination), which added provisions to The Residential Tenancies Act to allow for the early termination of rental agreements if the tenant faces health issues that prevent them from continuing to live in their current rental unit, if they are in the armed forces and are being relocated, or if they are victims of domestic violence and believe that their safety is at risk if they continue living there. The bill was passed by the house with a unanimous vote at third reading and was assented to on June 16, 2011.

Blady is active in liaising with other legislative bodies on an international level as the President of the Manitoba section of the Parliamentary Assembly of the Francophonie and as a member of the Energy Committee of the Midwestern Legislators Conference (part of the Council of State Governments).

Blady was re-elected in the 2011 provincial election on October 4 with a margin of 21 votes.

Blady was appointed as the Minister of Health of Manitoba following a cabinet reshuffle on November 3, 2014.

Blady lost her seat in the legislature to Progressive Conservative candidate Scott Fielding in the 2016 provincial election.

== Electoral record ==
2016 Manitoba general election: Kirkfield Park
Party	Candidate	Votes	%	±%	Expenditures
Progressive Conservative	Scott Fielding	5,457	53.47	+6.92	$43,828.72
New Democratic	Sharon Blady	3,075	30.13	-16.62	$41,575.18
Liberal	Kelly Nord	889	8.71	+5.23	$4,950.59
Green	Lisa Omand	784	7.68	+4.47	$0.00
Total valid votes/expense limit		10,205	99.26	-0.45	$
Total rejected ballots		76	0.74	+0.45	
Turnout		10,281	68.71	-0.25	
Eligible voters		14,962			
Progressive Conservative gain from New Democratic		Swing		+11.77	
Source: Elections Manitoba

2011 Manitoba general election: Kirkfield Park
Party	Candidate	Votes	%	±%	Expenditures
New Democratic	Sharon Blady	4,928	46.75	-2.57	$24,940.91
Progressive Conservative	Kelly de Groot	4,907	46.55	+8.43	$27,048.90
Liberal	Syed Bokhari	367	3.48	-9.08	$6,309.33
Green	Alanna Gray	339	3.22	–	$41.62
Total valid votes		10,541	99.71		
Total rejected ballots		31	0.29	-0.16	
Turnout		10,572	68.97	-0.24	
Eligible voters		15,329			
New Democratic hold		Swing		-5.50	
Source: Elections Manitoba

2007 Manitoba general election: Kirkfield Park
Party	Candidate	Votes	%	±%	Expenditures
New Democratic	Sharon Blady	4,997	49.32	+18.26	$28,330.71
Progressive Conservative	Chris Kozier	3,862	38.12	-8.60	$22,764.35
Liberal	Douglas Kaylor	1,273	12.56	-9.65	$5,428.14
Total valid votes		10,132	99.55		
Total rejected ballots		46	0.45	+0.18	
Turnout		10,178	69.21	+7.77	
Eligible voters		14,707			
New Democratic gain from Progressive Conservative		Swing		+13.43	

== Publications ==
- Blady, Sharon (1995). The Flower Beadwork People: Factors Contributing to the Emergence of Distinctive Metis Cultural Artistic Style at Red River from 1844 to 1869 (MA thesis). University of Victoria. OCLC 858544790.
- — (1996). "Beadwork As an Expression of Métis Cultural Identity". In Oakes, Jill; Riewe, Rick (eds.). Issues in the North, Volume I. Edmonton: Canadian Circumpolar Institute. ISBN 978-0-919058-78-1. ISSN 0068-0303.
- — (1997). "Les Métissess: Towards a Feminist History of Red River". In Oakes, Jill; Riewe, Rick (eds.). Issues in the North, Volume II. Edmonton: Canadian Circumpolar Institute. ISBN 978-0-919058-87-3. ISSN 0068-0303.
- Oakes, Jill; Riewe, Rick; Belanger, Yale; Blady, Sharon; et al., eds. (2004). Aboriginal Cultural Landscapes. Winnipeg: Aboriginal Issues Press. ISBN 978-0-9686138-4-9. OCLC 56371181.

Legislative Assembly of Manitoba
Preceded by Stuart Murray	Member of the Legislative Assembly for Kirkfield Park; 2007–2016	Succeeded by Scott Fielding
Political offices
Preceded by Jim Rondeau as Manitoba Minister of Healthy Living, Seniors and Consumer Affairs	Manitoba Minister of Healthy Living and Seniors; 2013–2014	Succeeded by Deanne Crothers
Preceded by Erin Selby	Manitoba Minister of Health; 2014–2016	Succeeded by Kelvin Goertzen as Manitoba Minister of Health, Seniors and Active Living
