= Domo Gasoline =

Canadian gas retailer

Domo Corporation Ltd.
- Trade name: Domo
- Type: Private
- Industry: Gasoline
- Founded: 1958
- Founder: Douglas Everett
- Headquarters: 270 Fort Street; Winnipeg, Manitoba; R3C 1E5
- Key people: Douglas Everett, board chair
- Revenue: CA$220 m (2018)
- Owner: Royal Canadian Securities Ltd.
- Website: domo.ca

Domo Corporation Ltd. (trading name: Domo) is a private Canadian gas retailer based in Winnipeg, Manitoba. The company is owned by the Everett family of Winnipeg.

Operating over 90 retail outlets across western Canada, Domo has 18 gas stations in Winnipeg—4 self-service stations and 14 full-service stations—as well as locations in Saskatchewan, Alberta, and British Columbia.

The company also sponsors a free public transit service (called the Domo Trolley) for Assiniboine Park to get to different spots within the park.

== History ==
The company, incorporated as Domo Gasoline Corporation Ltd., was founded in Winnipeg by Douglas Everett in 1958. It originally began as one of two gas stations that operated as a division of the Everett family's Dominion Motors car dealership, from which the name Domo came from.

The first Domo outlets were built on Safeway parking lots in the 1970s. In the 1980s, Domo expanded to Edmonton, Calgary, Saskatoon, Regina, and Vancouver.

During the 1990s, Domo's president and CEO was Everett's son-in-law Stuart Murray, who later became leader of the Progressive Conservative Party of Manitoba.
