= Independent candidates in the 1999 Manitoba provincial election =

There were several independent candidates in the 1999 Manitoba provincial election, none of whom were elected. Information about these candidates may be found on this page.

== Don Jessiman (Brandon East) ==
Jessiman was born in Wellwood, Manitoba, and has lived in Brandon for all of his adult life. He worked as a Western Regional Manager for the provincial government's Driver and Vehicle Licensing, and is now retired. He was a city councillor, having represented Brandon's Green Acres Ward (Ward 10) from 1995 until 2010 when he lost to Jan Chaboyer. Jessiman has also been a director for the Federation of Canadian Municipalities.

In 1998, he supported the construction of a new Maple Leaf Hog Plant in the area. In 1999, he participated in a federal task force on project funding in western Canada.

Jessiman was a member of the New Democratic Party when he was first elected in 1995. His participation in the 1999 provincial election was a surprise to most political observers. He filed his nomination papers minutes before the deadline, saying that none of the parties were sufficiently focused on seniors or housing for young people. He was 67 years old during the election.

Electoral record
Election	Division	Party	Votes	%	Place	Winner
1995 Brandon	Council, Ward Ten	n/a	616		1/3	himself
1999 provincial	Brandon East	Independent	525	6.65	3/4	Drew Caldwell, New Democratic Party
1998 Brandon	Council, Ward Ten	n/a	accl.	-	1/1	himself
2002 Brandon	Council, Ward Ten	n/a	777		1/3	himself
2006 Brandon	Council, Ward Ten	n/a	686		1/2	himself

== Peter Juba (Point Douglas) ==
Juba ran for Mayor of Winnipeg in 1986 and finished third in a field of ten candidates, behind frontrunners William Norrie and Russell Doern. Juba's relatively strong showing may have been partly the result of voters confusing him with Stephen Juba, who served as Winnipeg's mayor from 1957 to 1977. Peter Juba supported lower property taxes and a wage reduction for senior government officials and claimed not to know if he was related to Stephen Juba.

He received 360 votes (5.75%) in the 1999 election, finishing last in a field of four candidates. The winner was George Hickes of the New Democratic Party.

Juba later contested the Mynarski ward in the 2002 Winnipeg municipal elections and placed third against Harry Lazarenko with 1,138 votes.
