= Myrna Driedger =

Canadian politician

Myrna Driedger OM

30th Speaker of the Legislative Assembly of Manitoba
- In office May 18, 2016 – November 9, 2023
- Preceded by: Daryl Reid
- Succeeded by: Tom Lindsey

Member of the Legislative Assembly of Manitoba for Roblin Charleswood 1998–2019
- In office April 28, 1998 – September 5, 2023
- Preceded by: Jim Ernst
- Succeeded by: Kathleen Cook

Personal details
- Born: 1952 (age 73–74) Benito, Manitoba, Canada
- Party: Progressive Conservative Party of Manitoba
- Education: Red River College Polytechnic
- Occupation: Nurse

Myrna Driedger OM (Mur-nə Dree-jər) (born 1952) is a former politician in Manitoba, Canada. She was a member of the Legislative Assembly of Manitoba from 1998 to 2023, and Speaker of the Legislative Assembly from 2016 to 2023.

== Personal life ==
She was born in Benito, Manitoba, and was educated at Benito Collegiate, at the Winnipeg General Hospital School of Nursing, and at Red River Community College.

Before entering provincial politics, Driedger worked as a nurse for 23 years. She was CEO of Child Find Manitoba, and was co-chair of the province's Abuse Prevention Services Adult Advisory Committee. She has also participated in other groups that provide services to poor and vulnerable children. At one stage, she was Manitoba President of the Canadian Association of Neurological and Neurosurgical Nurses.

She is married to Helmut Driedger.

== Politics ==
Driedger was elected to the provincial legislature in a 1998 by-election, in the upscale west Winnipeg riding of Charleswood. A Progressive Conservative, Driedger defeated Liberal candidate Alan McKenzie by 2,767 votes to 1,524. She was subsequently named legislative assistant to the Minister of Family Services and the Minister of Health.

The Progressive Conservative government of Gary Filmon was defeated in the 1999 provincial election, although Driedger was re-elected in Charleswood by an increased margin. She was again re-elected in the 2003 election, defeating her leading opponent by over one thousand votes. Although the governing New Democratic Party made significant inroads in south-end Winnipeg in 2003, they were unable to do better than a third-place finish in Driedger's riding, due in part to the popularity of Manitoba Liberal Party candidate Rick Ross.

Driedger has participated in a panel seeking input on possible reforms to the province's Young Offenders Act, and has also participated in programs for Indigenous children. In 2001, she visited France and Switzerland on a fact-finding mission concerning the health-care policies of these countries. In 2003, she advocated the establishment of a Manitoba Heart Institute to reduce waitlist times. She supports Medicare, but has also called for the introduction of further private health services to the province.

She campaigned for Conservative Party of Canada candidate Steven Fletcher in the federal election of 2004.

During her time in Opposition, Driedger was able to get five private members’ bills passed, including a date rape prevention bill; mandatory accreditation of all mammography machines; establishment of April as Sexual Assault Awareness Month; an act to celebrate the centennial of (most) Manitoba women getting the vote; and the founding of the Nellie McClung Foundation.

Driedger has been involved with the Commonwealth Women Parliamentarians (CWP) and Commonwealth Parliamentary Association (CPA) organizations for a number of years, eventually becoming the first Manitoban to chair CWP.

She was re-elected in the 2007, 2011, 2016 and 2019 provincial elections. In January 2023, she announced her retirement at the end of the legislature.

== Honours and accolades ==
In 2023, she received the Commonwealth Parliamentarian Lifetime Achievement Award by the Commonwealth Parliamentary Association.

Driedger was appointed as a member of the Order of Manitoba in 2024.
