= 1999 Manitoba general election =

- September 21, 1999

57 seats of the Legislative Assembly of Manitoba 29 seats were needed for a majority
- Turnout: 68.11% (▼1.09%)
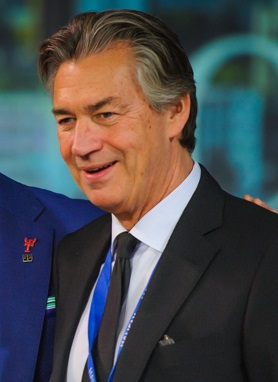

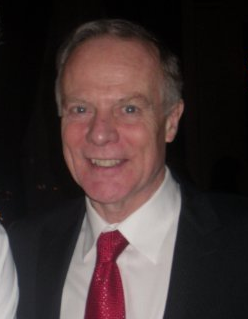
	First party	Second party	Third party
		PC
Leader	Gary Doer	Gary Filmon	Jon Gerrard
Party	New Democratic	Progressive Conservative	Liberal
Leader since	March 30, 1988	December 10, 1983	October 17, 1998
Leader's seat	Concordia	Tuxedo	River Heights
Last election	23	31	3
Seats won	32	24	1
Seat change	▲9	▼7	▼2
Popular vote	219,679	201,562	66,111
Percentage	44.51%	40.84%	13.40%
Swing	▲11.70%	▼2.03%	▼10.33%
- Popular vote by riding. As this is an FPTP election, seat totals are not determined by popular vote, but instead via results by each riding. Click the map for more details.
Premier before election
Gary Filmon
Progressive Conservative
Premier after election
Gary Doer
New Democratic

The 1999 Manitoba general election was held on September 21, 1999 to elect Members of the Legislative Assembly of the Province of Manitoba, Canada.

The New Democratic Party (NDP) was returned to government after sitting in opposition since the 1988 election. The NDP won 32 seats, against 24 for the Progressive Conservative Party. The Manitoba Liberal Party won one seat.

The Manitoba PC Party declined in popularity due to unpopular budget cuts on the healthcare system, social programs, and civil servants. The budget cuts on Public Service employees resulted in "Filmon Fridays" where civil servants had to take 10 unpaid days off each year. A vote splitting scandal has also hurt the Manitoba PC Party's reputation when the Independent Native Voice Party was claimed to be funded by the PC Caucus in attempt to take away votes from the NDP during the 1995 election.

== Reorganization of electoral divisions ==
An Act was passed in 1999, providing for the following changes to representation in the Legislative Assembly:

Abolished ridings	New ridings
New ridings
	Fort Whyte (Note: from parts of Fort Garry, St. Norbert and Tuxedo)
Reorganization of ridings
Broadway; Crescentwood; Osborne	Fort Rouge; Lord Roberts
Dauphin; Roblin-Russell	Dauphin-Roblin; Russell
Renaming of ridings
Gladstone	Carman (Note: with parts of Lakeside and Morris)
Niakwa	Southdale (Note: with part of St. Vital)
St. James	Minto
Sturgeon Creek	St. James

== Results ==
Summary of the September 21, 1999 Manitoba Legislature election results
Party	Party leader	Candidates	Seats				Popular vote		
Party	Party leader	Candidates	1995	Dissol.	**1999**	+ / —	#	%	Change
New Democratic	Gary Doer	57	23	23	32	+9	219,689	44.51%	+11.70%
Progressive Conservative	Gary Filmon	57	31	31	24	–7	201,562	40.84%	-2.03%
Liberal	Jon Gerrard	50	3	2	1	-2	66,111	13.40%	-10.33%
Manitoba Party	Roger Woloshyn	12	0	0	0	—	2,869	0.58%	—
Green	Markus Buchart	6	0	0	0	—	973	0.20%	—
Libertarian	Dennis Rice	6	0	0	0	—	658	0.13%	+0.01%
Communist	Darrell Rankin	6	0	0	0	—	446	0.09%	
Independents and no affiliation		4	0	0	0	—	1,226	0.25%	—
Vacant				1					
**Total Valid Votes**		**198**	**57**	**57**	**57**	—	**493,534**	**68.11%**	
**Registered Voters**							729,188		

=== Vote and seat summaries ===
Ternary plots – shift of electoral support (1995–1999)
1995

1999
Electoral districts identified by colours of winning parties

Popular vote
New Democratic	44.51%
PC	40.84%
Liberal	13.40%
Others	1.25%

Seats summary
New Democratic	56.14%
PC	42.11%
Liberal	1.75%

== Results by riding ==
=== Northern Manitoba/Parkland ===
Electoral district	Candidates					Incumbent
Electoral district	NDP	PC	Liberal	Green	Other	Incumbent
Dauphin-Roblin	**Stan Struthers**; 5,596 (55.67%)	Lorne Boguski; 4,001 (39.80%)			Doug McPhee (Manitoba Party); 455 (4.53%)	Stan Struthers
Flin Flon	**Gerard Jennissen**; 3,026 (64.91%)	Tom Therien; 1,368 (29.34%)			Phillip Ng (Independent); 268 (5.75%)	Gerrard Jennissen
Rupertsland	**Eric Robinson**; 2,007 (59.15%)	David Harper; 678 (19.98%)	Darcy Wood; 708 (20.87%)			Eric Robinson
Swan River	**Rosann Wowchuk**; 4,931 (54.97%)	Maxine Plesiuk; 3,482 (38.81%)			Wayne Klekta (Manitoba Party); 558 (6.22%)	Rosann Wowchuk
The Pas	**Oscar Lathlin**; 2,952 (46.85%)	Ron Evans; 2,737 (43.44%)	Don Sandberg; 612 (9.71%)			Oscar Lathlin
Thompson	**Steve Ashton**; 3,793 (70.99%)	Cecil Thorne; 1,306 (24.44%)	Pascal Bighetty; 244 (4.57%)			Steve Ashton

=== Westman ===
Electoral district	Candidates					Incumbent
Electoral district	NDP	PC	Liberal	Green	Other	Incumbent
Arthur-Virden	Perry Kalynuk; 3,063 (35.79%)	**Larry Maguire**; 4,215 (49.24%)	Bob Brigden; 1,281 (14.97%)			**Larry Maguire**
Brandon East	**Drew Caldwell**; 4,840 (61.28%)	Marty Snelling; 2,080 (26.34%)	Peter Logan; 453 (5.74%)		Don Jessiman (Ind.); 525 (6.65%)	Leonard Evans
Brandon West	**Scott Smith**; 4,898 (49.26%)	James McCrae; 4,546 (45.72%)	Lisa Roy; 407 (4.09%)		Lisa Gallagher (Communist); 92 (0.93%)	James McCrae
Minnedosa	Harvey Paterson; 2,841 (37.72%)	**Harold Gilleshammer**; 3,744 (49.71%)	Gordon Powell; 578 (7.67%)		Brion Pollon (Manitoba Party); 369 (4.90%)	**Harold Gilleshammer**
Russell	Vince Lelond; 3,802 (46.37%)	**Len Derkach**; 4,397 (53.63%)				New riding

=== Central Manitoba ===
Electoral district	Candidates					Incumbent
Electoral district	NDP	PC	Liberal	Green	Other	Incumbent
Carman	Diane Beresford; 1,519 (20.23%)	**Denis Rocan**; 3,698 (49.25%)	Raymond Le Neal; 2,291 (30.51%)			New riding
Gimli	Fran Fredrickson; 5,086 (43.87%)	**Ed Helwer**; 5,488 (47.34%)	Pat Carroll; 1,019 (8.79%)			**Ed Helwer**
Interlake	**Tom Nevakshonoff**; 3,809 (48.59%)	Betty Green; 3,260 (41.59%)	Margaret Swan; 770 (9.82%)			**Tom Nevakshonoff**
Lakeside	Paul Pododworny; 2,785 (30.68%)	**Harry Enns**; 4,426 (48.75%)	Dave Harcus; 1,646 (18.13%)		Marcel Van De Kerckhove (Manitoba Party); 222 (2.45%)	**Harry Enns**
Morris	Paul Hagen; 1,796 (20.51%)	**Frank Pitura**; 4,673 (53.38%)	Herm Martens; 2,179 (24.89%)		Dennis Rice (Libertarian); 107 (1.22%)	**Frank Pitura**
Pembina	Celso Arévalo; 1,120 (16.08%)	**Peter Dyck**; 4,808 (69.01%)	Marilyn Skubovious; 1,039 (14.91%)			**Peter Dyck**
Portage la Prairie	Connie Gretsinger; 2,769 (37.06%)	**David Faurschou**; 3,476 (46.52%)	Dave Cook; 1,116 (14.94%)		Gary Bergen (Libertarian); 111 (1.49%)	**David Faurschou**
Selkirk	**Greg Dewar**; 5,376 (54.35%)	Barry Uskiw; 3,353 (33.90%)	Joe Smolinski; 1,162 (11.75%)			**Greg Dewar**
Ste. Rose	Louise Wilson; 3,293 (42.46%)	**Glen Cummings**; 3,871 (49.92%)	Fred Juskowiak; 591 (7.62%)			**Glen Cummings†**
Turtle Mountain	Janet Brady; 1,902 (26.47%)	**Mervin Tweed**; 4,037 (56.18%)	Lorne Hanks; 1,247 (17.35%)			**Mervin Tweed**

=== Eastman ===
Electoral district	Candidates					Incumbent
Electoral district	NDP	PC	Liberal	Green	Other	Incumbent
Emerson	David Kiansky; 1,332 (18.05%)	**Jack Penner**; 3,994 (54.12%)	Ted Klassen; 2,054 (27.83%)			**Jack Penner**†
Lac du Bonnet	Michael Hameluck; 4,686 (49.22%)	**Darren Praznik**; 4,835 (50.78%)				**Darren Praznik**
La Verendrye	**Ron Lemieux**; 3,533 (41.20%)	Ben Sveinson; 3,367 (39.26%)	Léon Morrissette; 1,465 (17.08%)		Bonnie Fedak (Manitoba Party); 211 (2.46%)	**Ben Sveinson**
Springfield	Leonard Kimacovich; 4,058 (40.58%)	**Ron Schuler**; 4,969 (49.68%)	Patricia Aitken; 771 (7.71%)		Roger Woloshyn (Manitoba Party); 203 (2.03%)	Glen Findlay
Steinbach	Peter Hiebert; 910 (12.46%)	**Jim Penner**; 5,708 (78.13%)	Rick Ginter; 688 (9.42%)			Albert Driedger

=== Northwest Winnipeg ===
Electoral district	Candidates					Incumbent
Electoral district	NDP	PC	Liberal	Green	Other	Incumbent
Burrows	**Doug Martindale**; 5,151 (66.34%)	Cheryl Clark; 724 (9.32%)	Mike Babinsky; 1,849 (23.81%)		Darrell Rankin (Communist); 41 (0.53%)	**Doug Martindale**
Inkster	Becky Barrett; 3,501 (44.45%)	George Sandhu; 1,017 (12.91%)	Kevin Lamoureux; 3,358 (42.64%)			**Kevin Lamoureux**
Kildonan	**Dave Chomiak**; 6,101 (62.66%)	Shannon Martin; 2,542 (26.11%)	Michael Lazar; 1,093 (11.23%)			**Dave Chomiak**
Point Douglas	**George Hickes**; 3,338 (53.34%)	Mary Richard; 1,224 (19.56%)	Ajay Chopra; 1,336 (21.35%)		Peter Juba (Independent); 360 (5.75%)	**George Hickes**
St. Johns	**Gord Mackintosh**; 5,766 (72.00%)	Ray Larkin; 1,635 (20.42%)	Patrick Fontaine; 607 (7.58%)			**Gord Mackintosh**
The Maples	**Cris Aglugub**; 4,329 (54.49%)	Ellen Kowalski; 2,310 (29.07%)	Sudhir Sandhu; 1,233 (15.52%)		Caneda Menard (Independent); 73 (0.92%)	Gary Kowalski
Wellington	**Conrad Santos**; 4,102 (69.28%)	Allison Frate; 935 (15.79%)	Bernie Doucette; 757 (12.79%)		Paul Baskerville (Manitoba Party); 127 (2.14%)	Conrad Santos
**Totals**	NDP; 32,288 (60.34%)	PC; 10,387 (19.41%)	Liberal; 10,223 (19.13%)		Other; 601 (0.12%)	

=== Northeast Winnipeg ===
Electoral district	Candidates					Incumbent
Electoral district	NDP	PC	Liberal	Green	Other	Incumbent
Concordia	**Gary Doer**; 5,691 (70.09%)	Paul Murphy; 1,898 (23.37%)	Chris Hlady; 444 (5.47%)	C. David Nickarz; 87 (1.07%)		**Gary Doer**
Elmwood	**Jim Maloway**; 5,176 (62.86%)	Elsie Bordynuik; 2,659 (32.29%)			Cameron Neumann (Libertarian); 320 (3.89%); James Hoagaboam (Communist); 79 (0.96%)	**Jim Maloway**
Radisson	**Marianne Cerilli**; 5,198 (55.02%)	Henry A. McDonald; 3,114 (32.96%)	Betty Ann Watts; 1,136 (12.02%)			**Marianne Cerilli**
River East	Ross Eadie; 4,624 (43.31%)	**Bonnie Mitchelson**; 5,366 (50.25%)	Patrick Saydak; 688 (6.44%)			**Bonnie Mitchelson**
Rossmere	**Harry Schellenberg**; 5,097 (49.21%)	Vic Toews; 4,803 (46.37%)	Cecilia Connelly; 396 (3.82%)		Chris Buors (Libertarian); 62 (0.60%)	Vic Toews
St. Boniface	**Greg Selinger**; 5,439 (56.57%)	Robert Olson; 1,181 (12.28%)	Jean-Paul Boily; 2,994 (31.14%)			Neil Gaudry
Transcona	**Daryl Reid**; 5,620 (63.88%)	Dan Turner; 2,409 (27.38%)	Vibart Stewart; 713 (8.10%)		Paul Sidon (Communist); 56 (0.64%)	**Daryl Reid**

=== West Winnipeg ===
Electoral district	Candidates					Incumbent
Electoral district	NDP	PC	Liberal	Green	Other	Incumbent
Assiniboia	**Jim Rondeau**; 4,347 (44.24%)	Linda McIntosh; 4,344 (44.20%)	Deborah Shiloff; 1,136 (11.56%)			**Linda McIntosh**
Charleswood	Darryl Livingstone; 2,176 (21.28%)	**Myrna Driedger**; 5,437 (54.46%)	Alana McKenzie; 2,323 (23.27%)			**Myrna Driedger**
Kirkfield Park	Dennis Kshyk; 3,060 (26.51%)	**Eric Stefanson**; 6,108 (52.92%)	Vic Wieler; 2,306 (19.98%)			**Eric Stefanson**
St. James	**Bonnie Korzeniowski**; 4,483 (44.76%)	Gerry McAlpine; 3,845 (38.39%)	Wayne Helgason; 1,625 (16.23%)			MaryAnn Mihychuk
Tuxedo	Jack Dubois; 2,333 (23.80%)	**Gary Filmon**; 5,952 (60.72%)	Rochelle Zimberg; 1,391 (14.19%)	Markus Buchart; 126 (1.29%)		**Gary Filmon**

=== Central Winnipeg ===
Electoral district	Candidates					Incumbent
Electoral district	NDP	PC	Liberal	Green	Other	Incumbent
Fort Rouge	**Tim Sale**; 4,759 (48.42%)	Ron Paley; 2,971 (30.23%)	John Shanski; 1,870 (19.03%)	Alex Reid; 355 (4.97%)		New riding
Lord Roberts	**Diane McGifford**; 5,240 (52.99%)	Maggie Nishimura; 2,678 (27.08%)	Allen Mills; 1,776 (17.96%)	Lyle Ford; 136 (1.38%)		New riding
Minto	**MaryAnn Mihychuk**; 4,534 (63.92%)	Harry Lehotsky; 2,035 (28.69%)	Duane Poettcker; 452 (6.37%)		Harold Dyck (Communist); 45 (0.63%); Didz Zuzens (Libertarian); 27 (0.38%)	New riding
River Heights	Peter Reimer; 1,492 (12.98%)	Mike Radcliffe; 4,708 (40.95%)	**Jon Gerrard**; 5,173 (45.00%)	Chris Billows; 92 (0.80%)	Clancy Smith (Libertarian); 31 (0.27%)	Mike Radcliffe
Wolseley	**Jean Friesen**; 5,282 (69.15%)	Carol Friesen; 1,685 (22.06%)		Phyllis Abbé; 356 (4.66%)	David Allison (Communist); 133 (1.74%)	**Jean Friesen**

=== South Winnipeg ===
Electoral district	Candidates					Incumbent
Electoral district	NDP	PC	Liberal	Green	Other	Incumbent
Fort Garry	Lawrie Cherniack; 4,406 (43.46%)	**Joy Smith**; 4,436 (43.76%)	Ted Gilson; 1,143 (11.27%)		Denise Van Rooyen (Manitoba Party); 116 (1.14%)	Rosemary Vodrey
Fort Whyte	Bidhu Jha; 2,815 (26.82%)	**John Loewen**; 6,480 (61.73%)	Malli Aulakh; 1,202 (11.45%)			New riding
Riel	**Linda Asper**; 4,883 (46.68%)	David Newman; 4,559 (44.03%)	Clayton Weselowski; 820 (7.92%)		Mike Kubara (Manitoba Party); 91 (0.88%)	David Newman
Seine River	Leslie Fingler; 3,464 (35.34%)	**Louise Dacquay**; 4,684 (47.78%)	Jake Pankratz; 1,493 (15.23%)		Warren Goodwin (Manitoba Party); 129 (1.32%)	**Louise Dacquay**
Southdale	Iris Taylor; 2,909 (27.28%)	**Jack Reimer**; 5,455 (51.16%)	Shirley Chaput; 2,064 (19.36%)		Paul Gibson (Manitoba Party); 200 (1.88%)	**Jack Reimer**
St. Norbert	Marilyn Brick; 3,483 (38.69%)	**Marcel Laurendeau**; 4,152 (46.14%)	Mohinder Dhillon; 1,313 (14.59%)			**Marcel Laurendeau**
St. Vital	**Nancy Allan**; 5,298 (50.91%)	Shirley Render; 3,699 (36.09%)	Lynn Clark; 1,099 (10.72%)		Brian Hanslip (Manitoba Party); 188 (1.83%)	Shirley Render

=== Synopsis of results ===
1995 Manitoba general election – synopsis of riding results
Electoral division	Winning party							Votes (Note: All parties with more than 1% of the vote are shown individually. Independent candidates and other minor parties are aggregated separately.)					
Electoral division	1995	1st place	Votes	Share	Margin #	Margin %	2nd place	NDP	PC	Lib	Ind	Oth	Total
Arthur-Virden	PC	PC	4,215	49.25%	1,152	13.46%	NDP	3,063	4,215	1,281	–	–	8,559
Assiniboia	PC	NDP	4,347	44.24%	3	0.03%	PC	4,347	4,344	1,136	–	–	9,827
Brandon East	NDP	NDP	4,840	61.28%	2,760	34.95%	PC	4,840	2,080	453	525	–	7,898
Brandon West	PC	NDP	4,898	49.26%	352	3.54%	PC	4,898	4,546	407	–	92	9,943
Burrows	NDP	NDP	5,151	66.34%	3,302	42.52%	Lib	5,151	724	1,849	–	41	7,765
Carman	PC	PC	3,698	49.25%	1,407	18.74%	Lib	1,519	3,698	2,291	–	–	7,508
Charleswood	PC	PC	5,437	54.72%	3,114	31.34%	Lib	2,176	5,437	2,323	–	–	9,936
Concordia	NDP	NDP	5,691	70.09%	3,793	46.71%	PC	5,691	1,898	444	–	87	8,120
Dauphin-Roblin	New	NDP	5,596	55.67%	1,595	15.87%	PC	5,596	4,001	–	–	455	10,052
Elmwood	NDP	NDP	5,176	62.86%	2,517	30.57%	PC	5,176	2,659	–	–	399	8,234
Emerson	PC	PC	3,994	54.12%	1,940	26.29%	Lib	1,332	3,994	2,054	–	–	7,380
Flin Flon	NDP	NDP	3,026	64.91%	1,658	35.56%	PC	3,026	1,368	–	268	–	4,662
Fort Garry	PC	PC	4,436	43.92%	30	0.30%	NDP	4,406	4,436	1,143	–	116	10,101
Fort Rouge	New	NDP	4,759	48.68%	1,788	18.29%	PC	4,759	2,971	1,870	–	176	9,776
Fort Whyte	New	PC	6,480	61.73%	3,665	34.91%	NDP	2,815	6,480	1,202	–	–	10,497
Gimli	PC	PC	5,488	47.34%	402	3.47%	NDP	5,086	5,488	1,019	–	–	11,593
Inkster	Lib	NDP	3,501	44.45%	143	1.82%	Lib	3,501	1,017	3,358	–	–	7,876
Interlake	NDP	NDP	3,809	48.59%	549	7.00%	PC	3,809	3,260	770	–	–	7,839
Kildonan	NDP	NDP	6,101	62.66%	3,559	36.56%	PC	6,101	2,542	1,093	–	–	9,736
Kirkfield Park	PC	PC	6,108	53.23%	3,048	26.56%	NDP	3,060	6,108	2,306	–	–	11,474
La Vérendrye	PC	NDP	3,533	41.20%	166	1.94%	PC	3,533	3,367	1,465	–	211	8,576
Lac du Bonnet	PC	PC	4,835	50.78%	149	1.56%	NDP	4,686	4,835	–	–	–	9,521
Lakeside	PC	PC	4,426	48.75%	1,641	18.07%	NDP	2,785	4,426	1,646	–	222	9,079
Lord Roberts	New	NDP	5,240	53.31%	2,562	26.06%	PC	5,240	2,678	1,776	–	136	9,830
Minnedosa	PC	PC	3,744	49.71%	903	11.99%	NDP	2,841	3,744	578	–	369	7,532
Minto	NDP	NDP	4,534	63.92%	2,499	35.23%	PC	4,534	2,035	452	–	72	7,093
Morris	PC	PC	4,673	53.38%	2,494	28.49%	Lib	1,796	4,673	2,179	–	107	8,755
Pembina	PC	PC	4,808	69.01%	3,688	52.94%	NDP	1,120	4,808	1,039	–	–	6,967
Point Douglas	NDP	NDP	3,338	53.34%	2,002	31.99%	Lib	3,338	1,224	1,336	360	–	6,258
Portage la Prairie	PC	PC	3,476	46.52%	707	9.46%	NDP	2,769	3,476	1,116	–	111	7,472
Radisson	NDP	NDP	5,198	55.02%	2,084	22.06%	PC	5,198	3,114	1,136	–	–	9,448
Riel	PC	NDP	4,833	46.91%	274	2.66%	PC	4,833	4,559	820	–	91	10,303
River East	PC	PC	5,366	50.25%	742	6.95%	NDP	4,624	5,366	688	–	–	10,678
River Heights	PC	Lib	5,173	45.00%	465	4.04%	PC	1,492	4,708	5,173	–	123	11,496
Rossmere	PC	NDP	5,097	49.21%	294	2.84%	PC	5,097	4,803	396	–	62	10,358
Rupertsland	NDP	NDP	2,007	59.15%	1,299	38.28%	Lib	2,007	678	708	–	–	3,393
Russell	New	PC	4,397	53.63%	595	7.26%	NDP	3,802	4,397	–	–	–	8,199
Seine River	PC	PC	4,684	47.94%	1,220	12.49%	NDP	3,464	4,684	1,493	–	129	9,770
Selkirk	NDP	NDP	5,376	54.35%	2,023	20.45%	PC	5,376	3,353	1,162	–	–	9,891
Southdale	PC	PC	5,455	51.33%	2,546	23.96%	NDP	2,909	5,455	2,064	–	200	10,628
Springfield	PC	PC	4,969	49.69%	911	9.11%	NDP	4,058	4,969	771	–	203	10,001
St. Boniface	Lib	NDP	5,439	56.57%	2,445	25.43%	Lib	5,439	1,181	2,994	–	–	9,614
St. James	PC	NDP	4,483	45.04%	638	6.41%	PC	4,483	3,845	1,625	–	–	9,953
St. Johns	NDP	NDP	5,766	72.00%	4,131	51.59%	PC	5,766	1,635	607	–	–	8,008
St. Norbert	PC	PC	4,152	46.41%	670	7.49%	NDP	3,482	4,152	1,313	–	–	8,947
St. Vital	PC	NDP	5,218	51.14%	1,519	14.89%	PC	5,218	3,699	1,099	–	188	10,204
Ste. Rose	PC	PC	3,871	49.92%	578	7.45%	NDP	3,293	3,871	591	–	–	7,755
Steinbach	PC	PC	5,708	78.13%	4,798	65.67%	NDP	910	5,708	688	–	–	7,306
Swan River	NDP	NDP	4,931	54.97%	1,449	16.15%	PC	4,931	3,482	–	–	558	8,971
The Maples	Lib	NDP	4,329	54.49%	2,019	25.41%	PC	4,329	2,310	1,233	73	–	7,945
The Pas	NDP	NDP	2,952	46.85%	215	3.41%	PC	2,952	2,737	612	–	–	6,301
Thompson	NDP	NDP	3,793	70.99%	2,487	46.55%	PC	3,793	1,306	244	–	–	5,343
Transcona	NDP	NDP	5,620	63.88%	3,211	36.50%	PC	5,620	2,409	713	–	56	8,798
Turtle Mountain	PC	PC	4,037	56.18%	2,135	29.71%	NDP	1,902	4,037	1,247	–	–	7,186
Tuxedo	PC	PC	5,952	60.72%	3,619	36.92%	NDP	2,333	5,952	1,391	–	126	9,802
Wellington	NDP	NDP	4,102	69.28%	3,167	53.49%	PC	4,102	935	757	–	127	5,921
Wolseley	NDP	NDP	5,282	70.84%	3,597	48.24%	PC	5,282	1,685	–	–	489	7,456

= open seat
= winning candidate was in previous Legislature
= incumbent had switched allegiance
= previously incumbent in another riding
= incumbency arose from a byelection gain
= not incumbent; was previously elected to the Legislature
= other incumbents renominated
= previously an MP in the House of Commons of Canada
= multiple candidates

=== Turnout, winning shares and swings ===
Summary of riding results by turnout, vote share for winning candidate, and swing (vs 1995)
Riding and winning party			Turnout		Vote share (Note: Share won by winning candidate, with difference noted from share achieved by the same party in 1986.)		Swing (Note: Positive indicates improvement to standing of party winning in 1986; negative points to 1986's second-place party being swung to.)	
Riding and winning party			%	Change (pp)	%	Change (pp)	To	Change (pp)
Arthur-Virden	PC	Hold	64.57	-0.37	49.25	-15.11	NDP	-15.70
Assiniboia	NDP	Gain	72.37	1.60	44.24	24.01	PC	3.25
Brandon East	NDP	Hold	64.35	1.47	61.28	7.50	NDP	6.54
Brandon West	NDP	Gain	73.13	5.39	49.26	18.43	NDP	-11.06
Burrows	NDP	Hold	65.64	1.73	66.34	-1.13	NDP	3.77
Carman	PC	Hold	60.47	-1.00	49.25	-13.05	Liberal	-12.00
Charleswood	PC	Hold	73.87	-0.81	54.72	-3.28	PC	1.62
Concordia	NDP	Hold	64.30	-2.52	70.09	6.51	NDP	3.72
Dauphin-Roblin	NDP		72.61		55.67			
Elmwood	NDP	Hold	64.24	-4.61	62.86	9.85	NDP	4.64
Emerson	PC	Hold	62.24	-3.97	54.12	-8.78	Liberal	-5.75
Flin Flon	NDP	Hold	51.61	-5.48	64.91	12.86	NDP	10.97
Fort Garry	PC	Hold	75.09	3.93	43.92	-4.37	PC	10.12
Fort Rouge	NDP		69.88		48.68			
Fort Whyte	PC		76.43		61.73			
Gimli	PC	Hold	77.94	2.87	47.34	-3.31	NDP	-6.62
Inkster	NDP	Gain	72.28	5.26	44.45	13.83	NDP	-10.99
Interlake	NDP	Hold	62.99	-1.10	48.59	-2.58	PC	-4.79
Kildonan	NDP	Hold	70.85	-3.44	62.66	10.66	NDP	7.15
Kirkfield Park	PC	Hold	76.68	1.52	53.23	-6.92	Liberal	-0.28
La Verendrye	NDP	Gain	68.42	-1.29	41.20	15.49	PC	0.22
Lac du Bonnet	PC	Hold	66.36	-9.63	50.78	-6.29	NDP	-11.25
Lakeside	PC	Hold	67.98	3.24	48.75	-8.37	NDP	-7.76
Lord Roberts	NDP		69.02		53.31			
Minnedosa	PC	Hold	62.88	-1.74	49.71	-4.87	NDP	-8.91
Minto	NDP	Hold	64.09	-7.54	63.92	28.29	NDP	27.80
Morris	PC	Hold	67.12	-3.93	53.38	-7.61	Liberal	-3.71
Pembina	PC	Hold	52.56	-9.23	69.01	6.73	PC	12.00
Point Douglas	NDP	Hold	59.08	0.85	53.34	-9.69	Liberal	-3.99
Portage la Prairie	PC	Hold	59.76	-6.08	46.52	-4.84	PC	3.78
Radisson	NDP	Hold	71.09	4.47	55.02	2.98	NDP	8.25
Riel	NDP	Gain	76.34	0.69	46.91	18.49	PC	15.78
River East	PC	Hold	77.30	0.02	50.25	3.05	NDP	-4.95
River Heights	Liberal	Gain	83.67	2.01	45.00	5.80	Liberal	-6.42
Rossmere	NDP	Gain	79.47	2.39	49.21	4.49	NDP	-2.04
Rupertsland	NDP	Hold	38.73	-6.10	59.15	8.35	NDP	5.24
Russell	PC		65.20		53.63			
Seine River	PC	Hold	74.12	-0.41	47.94	-1.76	PC	8.31
Selkirk	NDP	Hold	73.38	-3.87	54.35	10.58	NDP	6.00
Southdale	PC	Hold	74.52	-2.80	51.33	0.47	PC	6.66
Springfield	PC	Hold	77.12	-0.29	49.69	-2.46	NDP	-3.98
St. Boniface	NDP	Gain	74.54	3.24	56.57	24.58	NDP	-19.46
St. James	NDP	Gain	72.03	1.33	45.04	27.58	PC	2.38
St. Johns	NDP	Hold	65.10	-2.38	72.00	13.47	NDP	13.39
St. Norbert	PC	Hold	72.68	0.81	46.41	2.51	PC	13.40
St. Vital	NDP	Gain	74.03	-0.67	51.14	16.52	NDP	-10.87
Ste. Rose	PC	Hold	61.95	-1.02	49.92	-2.07	NDP	-6.09
Steinbach	PC	Hold	57.51	-1.02	78.13	3.14	PC	4.43
Swan River	NDP	Hold	70.97	-3.96	54.97	8.66	NDP	7.87
The Maples	NDP	Gain	69.57	3.19	54.49	24.72	NDP	-28.64
The Pas	NDP	Hold	51.72	-6.51	46.85	-4.85	PC	-6.27
Thompson	NDP	Hold	54.40	-0.47	70.99	9.29	NDP	3.67
Transcona	NDP	Hold	67.98	-0.49	63.88	5.75	NDP	2.54
Turtle Mountain	PC	Hold	58.81	-7.97	56.18	-4.73	PC	0.01
Tuxedo	PC	Hold	71.83	-1.27	60.72	-5.50	PC	1.49
Wellington	NDP	Hold	58.86	-8.11	69.28	15.24	NDP	15.47
Wolseley	NDP	Hold	66.66	-1.07	70.84	14.46	N/A (Note: Liberals came in second in 1995, but did not field a candidate in 1999.)	

=== Changes in party shares ===
Share change analysis by party and riding (1995 vs 1990)
Riding	Liberal			NDP			PC	
Riding	%	Change (pp)		%	Change (pp)		%	Change (pp)
Arthur-Virden	14.97	-1.18		35.79	16.29		49.25	-15.11
Assiniboia	11.56	-15.26		44.24	24.01		44.20	-8.75
Brandon East	5.74	-8.57		61.28	7.50		26.34	-5.58
Brandon West	4.09	-15.67		49.26	18.43		45.72	-3.68
Burrows	23.81	9.26		66.34	-1.13		9.32	-8.66
Carman	30.51	10.94		20.23	2.10		49.25	-13.05
Charleswood	23.38	-6.52		21.90	9.80		54.72	-3.28
Concordia	5.47	-5.28		70.09	6.51		23.37	-0.93
Dauphin-Roblin	–	New		55.67	New		39.80	New
Elmwood	–	-15.26		62.86	9.85		32.29	0.56
Emerson	27.83	2.71		18.05	6.08		54.12	-8.78
Flin Flon	–	-9.53		64.91	12.86		29.34	-9.08
Fort Garry	11.32	-24.61		43.62	28.57		43.92	-4.37
Fort Rouge	19.13	New		48.68	New		30.39	New
Fort Whyte	11.45	New		26.82	New		61.73	New
Gimli	8.79	-6.63		43.87	9.94		47.34	-3.31
Inkster	42.64	-8.16		44.45	13.83		12.91	-3.09
Interlake	9.82	-0.52		48.59	-2.58		41.59	7.00
Kildonan	11.23	-7.03		62.66	10.66		26.11	-3.63
Kirkfield Park	20.10	-6.35		26.67	13.27		53.23	-6.92
La Verendrye	17.08	-9.20		41.20	15.49		39.26	-8.76
Lac du Bonnet	–	-9.91		49.22	16.20		50.78	-6.29
Lakeside	18.13	0.21		30.68	7.15		48.75	-8.37
Lord Roberts	18.07	New		53.31	New		27.24	New
Minnedosa	7.67	-12.98		37.72	12.95		49.71	-4.87
Minto	6.37	-27.30		63.92	28.29		28.69	-2.01
Morris	24.89	-0.20-1	20.51	8.04		53.38	-7.61	
Pembina	14.91	-17.28		16.08	10.55		69.01	6.73
Point Douglas	21.35	-1.71		53.34	-9.69		19.56	7.79
Portage la Prairie	14.94	-12.41		37.06	17.44		46.52	-4.84
Radisson	12.02	-13.52		55.02	2.98		32.96	10.54
Riel	7.96	-25.47		46.91	18.49		44.25	6.10
River East	6.44	-15.99		43.30	12.94		50.25	3.05
River Heights	45.00	5.80		12.98	1.03		40.95	-7.03
Rossmere	3.82	-5.49		49.21	4.49		46.37	0.40
Rupertsland	20.87	-2.13		59.15	8.35		19.98	6.00
Russell	–	New		46.37	New		53.63	New
Seine River	15.28	-18.38		35.46	18.82		47.94	-1.76
Selkirk	11.75	-9.16		54.35	10.58		33.90	-1.42
Southdale	19.42	-12.84		27.37	10.49		51.33	0.47
Springfield	7.71	-4.28		40.58	5.50		49.69	-2.46
St. Boniface	31.14	-14.33		56.57	24.58		12.28	-6.78
St. James	16.33	-15.24		45.04	27.58		38.63	-10.48
St. Johns	7.58	-13.30		72.00	13.47		20.42	-0.17
St. Norbert	14.68	-24.30		38.92	21.79		46.41	2.51
St. Vital	10.77	-13.14		51.14	16.52		36.25	-5.22
Ste. Rose	7.62	-8.04		42.46	10.11		49.92	-2.07
Steinbach	9.42	-5.72		12.46	2.58		78.13	3.14
Swan River	–	-6.44		54.97	8.66		38.81	-7.08
The Maples	15.52	-32.56		54.49	24.72		29.07	6.92
The Pas	9.71	-2.83		46.85	-4.85		43.44	7.68
Thompson	4.57	-11.22		70.99	9.29		24.44	1.94
Transcona	8.10	-5.59		63.88	5.75		27.38	0.68
Turtle Mountain	17.35	-4.75		26.47	9.47		56.18	-4.73
Tuxedo	14.19	-8.48		23.80	12.70		60.72	-5.50
Wellington	12.79	-15.69		69.28	15.24		15.79	-1.70
Wolseley	–	-21.96		70.84	14.46		22.60	0.94

== Post-election changes ==
Eric Stefanson (PC) resigned as the member for Kirkfield Park on September 7, 2000. A by-election was called for November 21 of the same year.

Manitoba provincial by-election, November 21, 2000: Kirkfield Park Resignation of Eric Stefanson
Party	Candidate	Votes	%	±%	Expenditures
Progressive Conservative	Stuart Murray	4,369	53.94	+0.70	$9,841
Liberal	Vic Wieler	2,158	26.64	+6.54	$4,355
New Democratic	Dawn Thompson	1,512	18.67	-8.00	$4,291
Libertarian	Dennis Rice	61	0.75		$0.00
Total valid votes		8,100	99.69		
Total rejected ballots		25	0.31	-0.27	
Turnout		8,125	54.87	-21.81	
Eligible voters		14,809			
Progressive Conservative **hold**		Swing		-2.92	

Tuxedo (res. Gary Filmon, September 18, 2000), November 21, 2000:

Manitoba provincial by-election, November 21, 2000 Resignation of Gary Filmon
Party	Candidate	Votes	%	±%
Progressive Conservative	Heather Stefanson	3,692	59.61	-1.12
Liberal	Rochelle Zimberg	1,586	25.61	+11.41
New Democratic	Iona Starr	916	14.79	-9.01
Total valid votes		6,194	99.76	
Total rejected ballots		15	0.24	-0.51
Turnout		6,209	46.03	-25.80
Eligible voters		13,488		
Progressive Conservative **hold**		Swing		-6.27
Source: Elections Manitoba

Lac Du Bonnett (res. Darren Praznik, February 8, 2002), March 12, 2002:

Manitoba provincial by-election, March 12, 2002: Lac du Bonnet Resignation of Darren Praznik
Party	Candidate	Votes	%	±%
Progressive Conservative	Gerald Hawranik	3,398	41.04	-9.74
New Democratic	Michael "Mike" Hameluck	3,234	39.06	-10.15
Liberal	George William Harbottle	1,647	19.89	–
Total valid votes		8,279	–	–
Rejected		N/A	–	
Eligible voters / Turnout		N/A	–	–
Source(s) Source:

Riel (res. Linda Asper, April 24, 2003)

Steinbach (res. Jim Penner, April 24, 2003)

== See also ==
- Independent candidates, 1999 Manitoba provincial election
