= Kirkfield Park =

Provincial electoral district in Manitoba, Canada

Coordinates: 49.870°N 97.288°W

Manitoba electoral district
- Location in Winnipeg

Provincial electoral district
- Legislature: Legislative Assembly of Manitoba
MLA
Logan Oxenham
New Democratic
- District created: 1979
- First contested: 1981
- Last contested: 2023

Demographics
- Census division(s): Division No. 11
- Census subdivision(s): Winnipeg

Kirkfield Park is a provincial electoral district of Manitoba, Canada. It was created by redistribution in 1979, and has formally existed since the provincial election of 1981. The riding is located in the westernmost tip of the city of Winnipeg. It contains the neighbourhoods of Glendale, Westwood, Kirkfield Park, Woodhaven, Birchwood, Booth, Silver Heights, and part of Assiniboia Downs

Kirkfield Park is bordered to the east by St. James, to the south and west by Charleswood, and to the north by Assiniboia. The St Charles and Glendale Country Clubs are in this riding, as are the Chapel Lawn Memorial Gardens and Assumption Cemetery.

The riding's population in 1996 was 20,236. In 1999, the average family income was $63,038, and the unemployment rate was 5.80%. Almost 13% of the riding's population are immigrants, including 6% German and 5% Ukrainian. Over twenty per cent of the riding's residents are over 65 years of age.

The service sector accounts for 15% of Kirkfield Park's industry, followed by 13% in retail trade.

Since its creation in 1981, the seat has been nearly continuously held by the Progressive Conservatives. Previously it was won by the New Democratic Party only twice, in 2007 and 2011, until 2023 when the NDP's Logan Oxenham picked the seat up a third time after having originally been defeated in the previous year's by-election.

== Members of the Legislative Assembly ==
Assembly	Years	Member	Party
Riding created from Sturgeon Creek and Assiniboia
32nd	1981–1986	Gerrie Hammond	Progressive Conservative
33rd	1986–1988	Gerrie Hammond	Progressive Conservative
34th	1988–1990	Gerrie Hammond	Progressive Conservative
35th	1990–1995	Eric Stefanson	Progressive Conservative
36th	1995–1999	Eric Stefanson	Progressive Conservative
37th	1999–2000	Eric Stefanson	Progressive Conservative
37th	2000–2003	Stuart Murray	Progressive Conservative
38th	2003–2006	Stuart Murray	Progressive Conservative
39th	2007–2011	Sharon Blady	New Democratic
40th	2011–2016	Sharon Blady	New Democratic
41st	2016–2019	Scott Fielding	Progressive Conservative
42nd	2019–2022	Scott Fielding	Progressive Conservative
42nd	2022–2023	Kevin Klein	Progressive Conservative
43rd	2023–present	Logan Oxenham	New Democratic

== Election results ==
2023 Manitoba general election
Party	Candidate	Votes	%	±%	Expenditures
New Democratic	Logan Oxenham	5,067	44.55	+18.87	$23,228.82
Progressive Conservative	Kevin Klein	4,406	38.74	-11.62	$59,804.69
Liberal	Rhonda Nichol	1,696	14.91	-0.76	$13,290.09
Green	Dennis Bayomi	205	1.80	-6.48	$2,776.31
Total valid votes/expense limit		11,374	99.63	–	$69,804.00
Total rejected and declined ballots		42	0.37	–	
Turnout		11,416	63.76	+2.51	
Eligible voters		17,906			
New Democratic gain from Progressive Conservative		Swing		+15.24	
Source(s) Source: Elections Manitoba

Manitoba provincial by-election, December 13, 2022 Resignation of Scott Fielding
Party	Candidate	Votes	%	±%	Expenditures
Progressive Conservative	Kevin Klein	2,357	37.04	-13.32	
New Democratic	Logan Oxenham	2,196	34.51	+8.82	
Liberal	Rhonda Nichol	1,741	27.36	+11.68	
Green	Dennis Bayomi	70	1.10	-7.19	
Total valid votes		6,364	99.86		
Total rejected ballots		11	0.17	-0.58	
Turnout		6,375	36.50	-24.75	
Eligible voters		17,468			
Progressive Conservative hold		Swing		-11.07	
Source: Elections Manitoba

2019 Manitoba general election
Party	Candidate	Votes	%	±%	Expenditures
Progressive Conservative	Scott Fielding	5,445	50.36	-1.8	$48,691.89
New Democratic	Kurt Morton	2,777	25.68	-4.5	$2,920.83
Liberal	Ernie Nathaniel	1,695	15.68	+6.2	$4,443.68
Green	Dennis Bayomi	896	8.29	+0.4	$0.00
Total valid votes		10,813	99.25		
Total rejected ballots		82	0.75		
Turnout		10,895	61.25		
Eligible voters		17,789			
Progressive Conservative hold		Swing		+1.3	

2016 provincial election redistributed results
Party	%
Progressive Conservative	52.2
New Democratic	30.2
Liberal	9.5
Green	7.9

2016 Manitoba general election
Party	Candidate	Votes	%	±%	Expenditures
Progressive Conservative	Scott Fielding	5,457	53.47	+6.92	$43,828.72
New Democratic	Sharon Blady	3,075	30.13	-16.62	$41,575.18
Liberal	Kelly Nord	889	8.71	+5.23	$4,950.59
Green	Lisa Omand	784	7.68	+4.47	$0.00
Total valid votes/expense limit		10,205	99.26		$
Total rejected ballots		76	0.74	+0.45	
Turnout		10,281	68.71	-0.25	
Eligible voters		14,962			
Progressive Conservative gain from New Democratic		Swing		+11.77	
Source: Elections Manitoba

2011 Manitoba general election
Party	Candidate	Votes	%	±%	Expenditures
New Democratic	Sharon Blady	4,928	46.75	-2.57	$24,940.91
Progressive Conservative	Kelly de Groot	4,907	46.55	+8.43	$27,048.90
Liberal	Syed Bokhari	367	3.48	-9.08	$6,309.33
Green	Alanna Gray	339	3.22	–	$41.62
Total valid votes		10,541	99.71		
Total rejected ballots		31	0.29	-0.16	
Turnout		10,572	68.97	-0.24	
Eligible voters		15,329			
New Democratic hold		Swing		-5.50	
Source: Elections Manitoba

2007 Manitoba general election
Party	Candidate	Votes	%	±%	Expenditures
New Democratic	Sharon Blady	4,997	49.32	+18.26	$28,330.71
Progressive Conservative	Chris Kozier	3,862	38.12	-8.60	$22,764.35
Liberal	Douglas Kaylor	1,273	12.56	-9.65	$5,428.14
Total valid votes		10,132	99.55		
Total rejected ballots		46	0.45	+0.18	
Turnout		10,178	69.21	+7.77	
Eligible voters		14,707			
New Democratic gain from Progressive Conservative		Swing		+13.43	

2003 Manitoba general election
Party	Candidate	Votes	%	±%	Expenditures
Progressive Conservative	Stuart Murray	4,294	46.72	-7.22	$20,826.03
New Democratic	Dennis Kshyk	2,855	31.06	+12.40	$4,760.05
Liberal	Brian Head	2,042	22.22	-4.42	$16,471.01
Total valid votes		9,191	99.73		
Total rejected ballots		25	0.27	-0.04	
Turnout		9,216	61.44	+6.57	
Eligible voters		15,000			
Progressive Conservative hold		Swing		-9.81	

Manitoba provincial by-election, November 21, 2000 Resignation of Eric Stefanson
Party	Candidate	Votes	%	±%	Expenditures
Progressive Conservative	Stuart Murray	4,369	53.94	+0.70	$9,841
Liberal	Vic Wieler	2,158	26.64	+6.54	$4,355
New Democratic	Dawn Thompson	1,512	18.67	-8.00	$4,291
Libertarian	Dennis Rice	61	0.75		$0.00
Total valid votes		8,100	99.69		
Total rejected ballots		25	0.31	-0.27	
Turnout		8,125	54.87	-21.81	
Eligible voters		14,809			
Progressive Conservative hold		Swing		-2.92	

1999 Manitoba general election
Party	Candidate	Votes	%	±%	Expenditures
Progressive Conservative	Eric Stefanson	6,108	53.23	-6.92	$31,323.00
New Democratic	Dennis Kshyk	3,060	26.67	+13.27	$6,620.00
Liberal	Vic Wieler	2,306	20.10	-6.35	$10,536.50
Total valid votes		11,474	99.42		
Total rejected ballots		67	0.58	+0.26	
Turnout		11,541	76.68	+1.52	
Eligible voters		15,051			
Progressive Conservative hold		Swing		-10.09	

1995 Manitoba general election
Party	Candidate	Votes	%	±%
Progressive Conservative	Eric Stefanson	5,949	60.15	+3.73
Liberal	Vic Wieler	2,616	26.45	-6.84
New Democratic	Darryl Livingstone	1,325	13.40	+3.35
Total valid votes		9,890	99.68	
Total rejected ballots		32	0.32	+0.19
Turnout		9,922	75.16	-2.26
Eligible voters		13,202		
Progressive Conservative hold		Swing		+5.29

1990 Manitoba general election
Party	Candidate	Votes	%	±%
Progressive Conservative	Eric Stefanson	5,813	56.42	+9.17
Liberal	Jasper McKee	3,430	33.29	-11.67
New Democratic	Shirley Manson	1,035	10.05	+2.26
Communist	Frank Goldspink	25	0.24	
Total valid votes		10,303	99.86	
Total rejected ballots		14	0.14	-0.09
Turnout		10,317	77.41	-2.40
Eligible voters		13,327		
Progressive Conservative hold		Swing		+10.42

1988 Manitoba general election
Party	Candidate	Votes	%	±%
Progressive Conservative	Gerrie Hammond	5,269	47.25	-9.89
Liberal	Irene Friesen	5,014	44.96	+24.88
New Democratic	Hamish Gavin	868	7.78	-14.99
Total valid votes		11,151	99.78	
Total rejected ballots		25	0.22	-0.05
Turnout		11,176	79.81	+11.19
Eligible voters		14,003		
Progressive Conservative hold		Swing		-17.39

== Previous boundaries ==
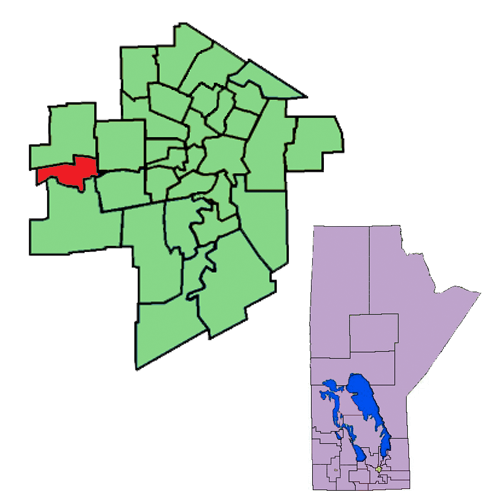
The 1999–2011 boundaries for Kirkfield Park highlighted in red.

== See also ==
- List of Manitoba provincial electoral districts
- Canadian provincial electoral districts
