= Eric Stefanson =

Canadian politician

Member of the Legislative Assembly of Manitoba for Kirkfield Park
- In office September 11, 1990 – September 7, 2000
- Preceded by: Gerrie Hammond
- Succeeded by: Stuart Murray

Winnipeg City Councillor for St Charles
- In office 1982–1989

Personal details
- Born: October 24, 1950 (age 75) Gimli, Manitoba, Canada
- Party: Progressive Conservative
- Education: University of Manitoba

Eric Stefanson (born October 24, 1950) is a politician in Manitoba, Canada. He served in the cabinet of Progressive Conservative Premier Gary Filmon from 1991 to 1999, and was a member of the Manitoba Legislature from 1990 to 2000. His father, also named Eric Stefanson, was a Progressive Conservative member of the House of Commons of Canada from 1958 to 1968.

== Early life ==
Stefanson was born in Gimli, Manitoba, and was educated at the University of Manitoba. He later practiced as a chartered accountant.

== Career ==
Stefanson was a member of the Winnipeg city council from 1982 to 1989 for the St. Charles riding, serving as Chair of the Finance Committee from 1984 to 1986 and Deputy Mayor from 1986 to 1988.

In the 1990 provincial election, Stefanson was elected to the provincial legislature in the upscale west Winnipeg riding of Kirkfield Park, defeating Liberal Jason McKee by over 2,000 votes. On February 5, 1991, he was appointed Minister of Industry, Trade and Tourism with responsibility for the Development Corporation Act, Sport, Fitness and Amateur Sport and the Boxing and Wrestling Commission Act. On September 10, 1993, Stefanson was promoted to Minister of Finance and Chair of the Treasury Board.

Stefanson was easily re-elected in the 1995 provincial election, defeating Liberal Vic Wieler by over 3,000 votes. On May 9, 1995, he was relieved of the Treasury Board portfolio and given responsibility for the Manitoba Lotteries Corporation Act (remaining Minister of Finance). On January 6, 1997, he was again given responsibility for the Boxing and Wrestling Commission Act and the Fitness and Amateur Sport Act.

In a cabinet shuffle on February 5, 1999, Stefanson was appointed Minister of Health and Deputy Premier, also retaining responsibilities of the Boxing/Wrestling Commission and Fitness/Amateur Sport Acts. He scored another easy victory in the 1999 provincial election (defeating New Democrat Dennis Kshyk by over 3,000 votes), but the Progressive Conservative party was defeated by the NDP at the provincial level and Stefanson moved into opposition. Although touted by many as a possible party leader after the resignation of Gary Filmon, he decided not to run for the position. On September 7, 2000, Stefanson resigned from the legislature to provide a seat for the party's incoming leader, Stuart Murray.

During his time in government, Stefanson was one of the most powerful ministers in Gary Filmon's cabinet. He presided over a series of balanced budgets, achieved at the cost of considerable cuts in public funding for various programs. In 1998, Stefanson was accused by some of exercising undue ministerial influence in the appointment of his brother, Tom, as CEO of Manitoba Telecom Services; no formal charges of impropriety were made, however. In 2000, he supported Tom Long for the leadership of the Canadian Alliance party.

From 2004 to 2009, Stefanson was a regional managing partner for BDO Dunwoody.

In January 2007, he was appointed by federal transport minister Lawrence Cannon to the board of directors of Via Rail Canada.
