= Minto (electoral district) =

Defunct provincial electoral district in Manitoba, Canada

Coordinates: 49.894°N 97.179°W

Manitoba electoral district
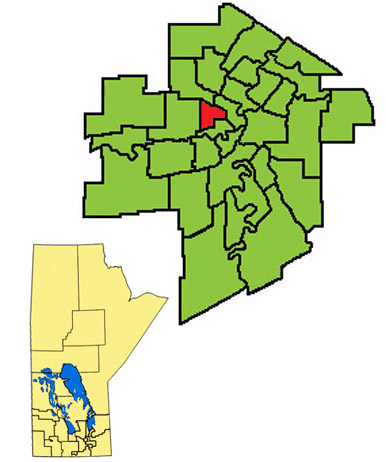

Defunct provincial electoral district
- Legislature: Legislative Assembly of Manitoba
- District created: 1998
- First contested: 1999
- Last contested: 2016

Minto was a provincial electoral district of Manitoba, Canada. It was created by redistribution in 1999, and has formally existed since the provincial election of 1999. The riding is located in the centre of the city of Winnipeg.

Minto was created primarily from territory from the old St. James riding, with some additional territory from Wellington as well. In many respects, the riding may be regarded as a successor to the St. James riding which existed before 1999.

Minto was bordered on the east by Point Douglas, to the north by Wellington, to the south by Wolseley, and to the west by the current St. James riding.

The riding's population in 1996 was 20,479. In 1999, the average family income was $37,037, and the unemployment rate was 13.80%. Thirty-seven per cent of the riding's residents are listed as low-income, one of the highest rates in the province. Twenty-two per cent of families in the riding are single-parent.

Minto has an immigrant population of 33%, the highest in the province. Sixteen per cent of the riding's residents are Filipino, 7% Portuguese, 3% Chinese and 2% Italian. The aboriginal population in the riding is 14%.

Manufacturing accounts for 25% of Minto's industry, with a further 19% in the service sector.

== Members of the Legislative Assembly ==
Parliament	Years	Member	Party
37th	1999–2003	MaryAnn Mihychuk	New Democratic
38th	2003–2004	MaryAnn Mihychuk	New Democratic
38th	2004–2007	Andrew Swan	New Democratic
39th	2007–2011	Andrew Swan	New Democratic
40th	2011–2016	Andrew Swan	New Democratic
41st	2016–2019	Andrew Swan	New Democratic

== Electoral results ==
2016 Manitoba general election
Party	Candidate	Votes	%	±%	Expenditures
New Democratic	Andrew Swan	2,954	51.70	-14.30	$26,466.03
Progressive Conservative	Belinda Squance	1,016	17.78	+2.57	$12,274.18
Liberal	Demetre Balaktsis	723	12.65	+1.53	$12,454.78
Independent	Don Woodstock	589	10.31	(-0.81)	$4,461.80
Green	Martha Jo Willard	410	7.16	+1.08	$675.67
Manitoba	Virgil Gil	51	0.89		$60.54
Communist	Andrew Taylor	41	0.71	-0.31	$33.67
Total valid votes/expense limit		5,784	100.0		$36,670.00
Eligible voters		10,729			
Source: Elections Manitoba

2011 Manitoba general election
Party	Candidate	Votes	%	±%	Expenditures
New Democratic	Andrew Swan	3,615	66.00	+3.18	18,232.83
Progressive Conservative	Belinda Squance	833	15.21	+2.89	6,812.15
Liberal	Don Woodstock	609	11.12	−10.56	10,634.00
Green	Harold Dyck	331	6.08	–	1,260.81
Communist	Cheryl-Anne Carr	56	1.02	−0.89	387.11
Total valid votes		5,444			
Rejected and declined votes		33			
Turnout		5,477	46.43		
Electors on the lists		11,796			
Source: Elections Manitoba

2007 Manitoba general election
Party	Candidate	Votes	%	±%	Expenditures
New Democratic	Andrew Swan	3,355	62.82%	+8.13	$22,471.08
Liberal	Wayne Helgason	1,158	21.68%	−9.35	$22,178.53
Progressive Conservative	Kenny Daodu	658	12.32%	+0.20	$10,160.91
Communist	Cheryl-Anne Carr	102	1.91%	−0.26	$373.87
Total valid votes		5,273	98.73%		
Rejected and declined votes		68			
Turnout		5,341	50.38		
Electors on the lists		10,601			

Manitoba provincial by-election, June 22, 2004 Resignation of MaryAnn Mihychuk
Party	Candidate	Votes	%	Expenditures
New Democratic	Andrew Swan	2,848	54.69	$14,208.77
Liberal	Wayne Helgason	1,616	31.03	$9,826.24
Progressive Conservative	David Laurence	631	12.12	$41.20
Communist	Cheryl-Anne Carr	113	2.17	$0.00
Total valid votes		5,208	99.17	
Rejected ballots		43	0.83	
Turnout		5,251	47.18	
Registered voters		11,129		

2003 Manitoba general election
Party	Candidate	Votes	%	±%	Expenditures
New Democratic	MaryAnn Mihychuk	3,586	69.47	+5.55	$11,337.04
Liberal	Mario Javier	685	13.27	+6.90	$5,174.30
Progressive Conservative	David Laurence	626	12.13	-16.56	$439.06
Green	Joan Johannson	197	3.82		$544.46
Communist	Cheryl-Anne Carr	68	1.32	+0.69	$376.06
Total valid votes		5,162	100.00		
Rejected and declined ballots		66			
Turnout		5,228	47.25		
Electors on the lists		11,064			

1999 Manitoba general election
Party	Candidate	Votes	%	Expenditures
New Democratic	MaryAnn Mihychuk	4,534	63.92	$23,618.00
Progressive Conservative	Harry Lehotsky	2,035	28.69	$18,962.44
Liberal	Duane Poettcker	452	6.37	$629.69
Communist	Harold Dyck	45	0.63	$0.00
Libertarian	Didz Zuzens	27	0.38	$270.76
Total valid votes		7,093		
Rejected and declined votes		63		
Turnout		7,156	64.08	
Electors on the lists		11,168		

== Previous boundaries ==
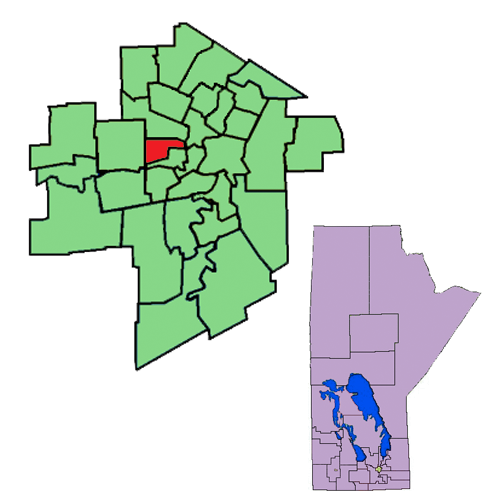
The 1999–2011 boundaries for Minto highlighted in red.

== See also ==
- List of Manitoba provincial electoral districts
- Canadian provincial electoral districts
