= Jim Ernst =

Canadian politician (born 1942)

James Arthur Ernst (born November 19, 1942) is a Canadian politician in Manitoba. He was a municipal councillor in Winnipeg from 1973 to 1986 and a member of the Legislative Assembly of Manitoba from 1986 to 1997. From 1988 to 1997, Ernst was a Cabinet minister in the government of Premier Gary Filmon.

The son of Frank Luther Ernst and Stella Sarah Bryson, he was born in Winnipeg and was educated at St. Paul's College (affiliated with the University of Manitoba). He worked as a real estate and insurance broker before entering public life. Ernst was elected as a councillor in the amalgamated City of Winnipeg in 1973, and was the city's deputy mayor from 1981 to 1986. During his time in municipal politics, Ernst was associated with the Independent Citizens' Election Committee, an unofficial alliance of right-wing business interests in the city.

In 1967, he married Dorothy Lynn Blom.

Ernst left municipal politics to run for the provincial legislature in the 1986 Manitoba general election. He was elected in the southwest Winnipeg riding of Charleswood as a Progressive Conservative, defeating his closest opponent by almost 4,000 votes. The seat had been vacated by former premier Sterling Lyon's retirement from electoral politics. The governing New Democratic Party (NDP) was narrowly re-elected, and Ernst joined 25 other Conservatives in opposition.

In March 1988, disgruntled NDP backbencher Jim Walding brought down the government. The resulting election took place at a time when the Manitoba Liberal Party was making inroads into both PC and NDP areas of support; Ernst was only narrowly re-elected, defeating Liberal candidate Shari Nelson by fewer than 1,000 votes.

The Conservatives, led by Gary Filmon, formed a minority government following this election. On May 9, 1988, Ernst was appointed Minister of Industry, Trade and Tourism, with responsibility for Development Corporation, Sport, the Fitness and Amateur Sport Act and the Boxing and Wrestling Commission Act and Manitoba Forestry.

The provincial Liberals had slipped in popularity by the provincial election of 1990, and Ernst was returned in Charleswood with minimal difficulty. After a cabinet shuffle on February 5, 1991, he was named Minister of Urban Affairs and Minister of Housing. After a further shift on September 10, 1993, he was named Minister of Consumer and Corporate Affairs and Government House Leader, once again receiving responsibility for Sport, the Fitness and Amateur Sport Act, the Boxing and Wrestling Commission and (until May 9, 1995) the Manitoba Lotteries Foundation Act.

Ernst and the Conservative government were convincingly re-elected in 1995. He was removed from cabinet following a shuffle on January 6, 1997, and resigned from the legislature that October 28.

After leaving politics, Ernst was appointed Vice-President of Optx 2000, a research and development firm. He has also been Chief Executive Officer of the Team Canada Volleyball Centre, and presided over the elimination of that organization's debt in 2002.
