= Kevin Klein (politician) =

Canadian politician

Minister of Environment and Climate
- In office January 30, 2023 – October 18, 2023
- Premier: Heather Stefanson
- Preceded by: Jeff Wharton
- Succeeded by: Tracy Schmidt

Member of the Legislative Assembly of Manitoba for Kirkfield Park
- In office December 13, 2022 – September 5, 2023
- Preceded by: Scott Fielding
- Succeeded by: Logan Oxenham

Winnipeg City Councillor for Charleswood-Tuxedo-Westwood
- In office November 7, 2018 – October 26, 2022
- Preceded by: Marty Morantz
- Succeeded by: Evan Duncan

Personal details
- Born: Harold Kevin Rout Jr.
- Party: Progressive Conservative

Kevin Elvis Klein (born Harold Kevin Rout Jr.) is a politician in Manitoba, Canada. A member of the Progressive Conservative Party, Klein has served in the Legislative Assembly of Manitoba and is a former City of Winnipeg councilor.

== Political career ==
Klein served as the Winnipeg City Councillor for Charleswood-Tuxedo-Westwood from 2018 to 2022. Klein also ran in the 2022 Winnipeg mayoral election, placing third. As a mayoral candidate, he focused on crime reduction, homelessness, addition of a City of Winnipeg Indigenous Economic Officer and not raising property taxes.

Klein has acted as chair of the Winnipeg Police Service Board and was a member of the City of Winnipeg Standing Policy Committee on Property and Development. He has been named an honorary chair for the Homes For Heroes Capital Campaign in support of the Winnipeg Kinsmen Veterans' Village.

Klein was elected to the Legislative Assembly of Manitoba in the 2022 Kirkfield Park provincial by-election for the electoral division of Kirkfield Park.

In the summer of 2023, CBC and the Winnipeg Free Press published articles about Klein's claim of Métis ancestry while campaigning for re-election. In response, Klein said he was on a personal journey to discover his heritage.

Along with his party, Klein was defeated in the October 3, 2023 provincial election. In September 2026, he announced his campaign for mayor in the 2026 Winnipeg municipal election, placing second behind incumbent Scott Gillingham.

== Newspaper career ==
Klein served as publisher of the Winnipeg Sun from 2007 to 2013. He was a regular columnist for the paper following his defeat in 2023 provincial election. On May 27, 2024, Postmedia Network announced it will sell the Sun, Portage la Prairie Graphic Leader, Kenora Miner and News, along with Postmedia's Winnipeg printing operations, to The Klein Group, of which Klein is president and CEO.

== Personal life ==
Klein's mother was a victim of domestic violence and was murdered by her partner. His stepfather served seven years in prison.

== Electoral results ==
2023 Manitoba general election: Kirkfield Park
Party	Candidate	Votes	%	±%	Expenditures
New Democratic	Logan Oxenham	5,067	44.55	+18.87	$23,228.82
Progressive Conservative	Kevin Klein	4,406	38.74	-11.62	$59,804.69
Liberal	Rhonda Nichol	1,696	14.91	-0.76	$13,290.09
Green	Dennis Bayomi	205	1.80	-6.48	$2,776.31
Total valid votes/expense limit		11,374	99.63	–	$69,804.00
Total rejected and declined ballots		42	0.37	–	
Turnout		11,416	63.76	+2.51	
Eligible voters		17,906			
New Democratic gain from Progressive Conservative		Swing		+15.24	
Source(s) Source: Elections Manitoba

Manitoba provincial by-election, December 13, 2022: Kirkfield Park Resignation of Scott Fielding
Party	Candidate	Votes	%	±%	Expenditures
Progressive Conservative	Kevin Klein	2,356	37.03	-13.33	
New Democratic	Logan Oxenham	2,196	34.51	+8.83	
Liberal	Rhonda Nichol	1,741	27.36	+11.69	
Green	Dennis Bayomi	70	1.10	-7.19	
Total valid votes		6,363	99.86		
Total rejected ballots		9	0.14	-0.61	
Turnout		6,372	36.48	-24.77	
Eligible voters		17,468			
Progressive Conservative hold		Swing		-11.08	
Source: Elections Manitoba

2022 Winnipeg mayoral election

Candidate	Votes	%
Scott Gillingham	53,663	27.54
Glen Murray	49,272	25.29
Kevin Klein	28,806	14.78
Shaun Loney	28,567	14.66
Robert-Falcon Ouellette	15,029	7.71
Jenny Motkaluk	7,443	3.82
Rana Bokhari	5,900	3.03
Rick Shone	2,570	1.32
Don Woodstock	1,889	0.97
Idris Adelakun	1,263	0.65
Chris Clacio	451	0.23

2018 Winnipeg municipal election: Charleswood-Tuxedo
Candidate	Votes	%
Kevin Klein	7,403	41.87
Grant Nordman	5,922	33.50
Kevin Nichols	2,690	15.22
Ken St. George	1,664	9.41
