= Arthur Moug =

Canadian politician

Art Thomas Moug (September 19, 1926 – July 16, 2003) was a politician in Manitoba, Canada. He was a Progressive Conservative member of the Legislative Assembly of Manitoba from 1969 to 1977.

Moug was born in Charleswood, Manitoba. He was educated in Winnipeg schools, and worked as a contractor, becoming the owner of Berkeley Construction. He was the Mayor of Charleswood from 1966 to 1971, prior to its amalgamation with Winnipeg. In 1969, he also served as chair of the city's public works committee. He was also a member of the Scottish Rite of freemasonry and the Royal Canadian Legion.

Moug was first elected to the Manitoba legislature in the 1969 provincial election, defeating former Liberal leadership candidate Duncan Edmonds by over 1,000 votes. He was re-elected in the 1973 election by a greater margin. The New Democrat Party was in power throughout this period, and Moug sat as an opposition MLA throughout his time in parliament. He did not seek re-election in 1977, instead choosing to step aside for party leader Sterling Lyon. He resumed his construction business after leaving office, and moved to Grande Prairie, Alberta in 1980.

Moug died in Grande Prairie at the age of 76.
