= Harry Lehotsky =

Harry Lehotsky, CM (26 July 1957 – 11 November 2006) was a pastor for the North American Baptist Conference and newspaper columnist. Lehotsky born in New York City, he moved to Winnipeg, Manitoba, and founded the church New Life Ministries there. He was also a columnist for the Winnipeg Sun newspaper where his final column was published 22 October 2006.

Lehotsky was mostly known for his advocacy on behalf of the poor in the West End of Winnipeg, and his dedication for improving the living conditions of his adopted neighborhood. He also helped found the Lazarus Housing and Nehemiah Housing programs as well as the Ellice Cafe and Theatre. After his diagnosis of terminal pancreatic cancer, but before his death, he was honoured with a mural on the side of a Maryland Street building depicting his efforts in the area. The Attorney General also created the Rev. Harry Lehotsky Award for Community Activism to recognize individuals and organizations that have made outstanding contributions to crime prevention in Manitoba.

Lehotsky was appointed a Member of the Order of Canada with effective date of 5 October 2006, as announced by the Canadian government on 20 February 2007. Though Lehotsky died before the official announcement, he was informed of the honour privately prior to his death.

In 2009 the City of Winnipeg named a newly renovated inner-city park the Harry Lehotsky Memorial Work Project.
