= Scott Fielding =

Canadian politician (born c. 1971)

Minister of Natural Resources and Northern Development
- In office January 18, 2022 – June 6, 2022
- Premier: Heather Stefanson
- Preceded by: Portfolio Created
- Succeeded by: Alan Lagimodiere

Manitoba Minister of Finance
- In office August 1, 2018 – January 18, 2022
- Premier: Brian Pallister; Kelvin Goertzen; Heather Stefanson
- Preceded by: Cameron Friesen
- Succeeded by: Cameron Friesen

Minister Responsible for the Civil Service Commission
- In office August 1, 2018 – October 23, 2019
- Premier: Brian Pallister
- Preceded by: Cameron Friesen
- Succeeded by: Reg Helwer

Minister of Families
- In office May 3, 2016 – August 1, 2018
- Premier: Brian Pallister
- Preceded by: Kerri Irvin-Ross
- Succeeded by: Heather Stefanson

Member of the Legislative Assembly of Manitoba for Kirkfield Park
- In office April 19, 2016 – June 17, 2022
- Preceded by: Sharon Blady
- Succeeded by: Kevin Klein

Winnipeg City Councillor for St. James-Brooklands
- In office October 25, 2006 – October 22, 2014
- Preceded by: Jae Eadie
- Succeeded by: Scott Gillingham

Personal details
- Born: 1971 or 1972 (age 54–55)
- Party: Progressive Conservative
- Spouse: Michelle
- Children: 3
- Education: University of Manitoba (BA)

Scott Bradley Fielding (born 1971 or 1972) is a former Canadian politician. A city councillor in Winnipeg, Manitoba, Canada from 2006 to 2014, he was elected to the Legislative Assembly of Manitoba in the 2016 provincial election. On September 10, 2019, Scott was re-elected as the Member of Manitoba Legislative Assembly from Kirkfield Park. On June 6, 2022 he announced on Twitter that he resigned from Cabinet and will not be seeking re-election.

== Education ==
Fielding received a Bachelor of Arts degree in political science and economics from the University of Manitoba.

== Work and community involvement ==
He held several positions within the government of Manitoba. He was the fundraising chair for the Bourkevale Community Club as well as being appointed by Mayor Sam Katz to the board of the Winnipeg Convention Centre. In 2008, he was appointed to the board of directors of Assiniboine Park Conservancy, where he continues to serve. He worked as a pharmaceutical sales representative and is part owner of Tiber River Naturals in Winnipeg.

== Political career ==
In the 1995 provincial election, he ran against Liberal MLA Kevin Lamoureux as a member of the Progressive Conservative Party of Manitoba. He was defeated.

He was first elected in October 2006 when he ran in municipal politics. Since then, he represented the St James-Brooklands ward in the Winnipeg City Council. In his first election, he defeated longtime incumbent Jae Eadie, scoring 48% of the vote in his ward in a four-way race.

He sat on the Property & Planning Committee of City Council and recently served as chair for the City of Winnipeg's Economic Opportunity Commission. The commission looked at ways to reduce wasteful spending and proposed ideas on how to eliminate the business tax.

In the spring of 2012, he considered running for the leadership of the Progressive Conservative Party of Manitoba. Citing family reasons, Fielding chose not to run.

In May 2014, Fielding announced that would not seek re-election in the 2014 municipal election. A month later, he announced he was seeking the Progressive Conservative nomination in Kirkfield Park for the 2016 provincial election. He won the nomination by acclamation in September 2014. On 19 April 2016, Fielding defeated New Democrat incumbent Sharon Blady to win the seat.

On 3 May 2016, Fielding was appointed to the Executive Council of Manitoba as Minister of Families. On 1 August 2018, Fielding was appointed as the Minister of Finance for the Province of Manitoba. On 10 September 2019, Fielding was re-elected from Kirkfield Park and was re-appointed as the Minister of Finance for the province of Manitoba.

== Personal ==
Fielding is married, and the father of two daughters and a son.

== Electoral record ==
2019 Manitoba general election: Kirkfield Park
Party	Candidate	Votes	%	±%	Expenditures
Progressive Conservative	Scott Fielding	5,445	50.36	-1.8	$48,691.89
New Democratic	Kurt Morton	2,777	25.68	-4.5	$2,920.83
Liberal	Ernie Nathaniel	1,695	15.68	+6.2	$4,443.68
Green	Dennis Bayomi	896	8.29	+0.4	$0.00
Total valid votes		10,813	99.25		
Total rejected ballots		82	0.75		
Turnout		10,895	61.25		
Eligible voters		17,789			
Progressive Conservative hold		Swing		+1.3	

2016 Manitoba general election: Kirkfield Park
Party	Candidate	Votes	%	±%	Expenditures
Progressive Conservative	Scott Fielding	5,457	53.47	+6.92	$43,828.72
New Democratic	Sharon Blady	3,075	30.13	-16.62	$41,575.18
Liberal	Kelly Nord	889	8.71	+5.23	$4,950.59
Green	Lisa Omand	784	7.68	+4.47	$0.00
Total valid votes/expense limit		10,205	99.26	-0.45	$
Total rejected ballots		76	0.74	+0.45	
Turnout		10,281	68.71	-0.25	
Eligible voters		14,962			
Progressive Conservative gain from New Democratic		Swing		+11.77	
Source: Elections Manitoba
