= Stuart Murray =

Canadian politician

Stuart Murray OM
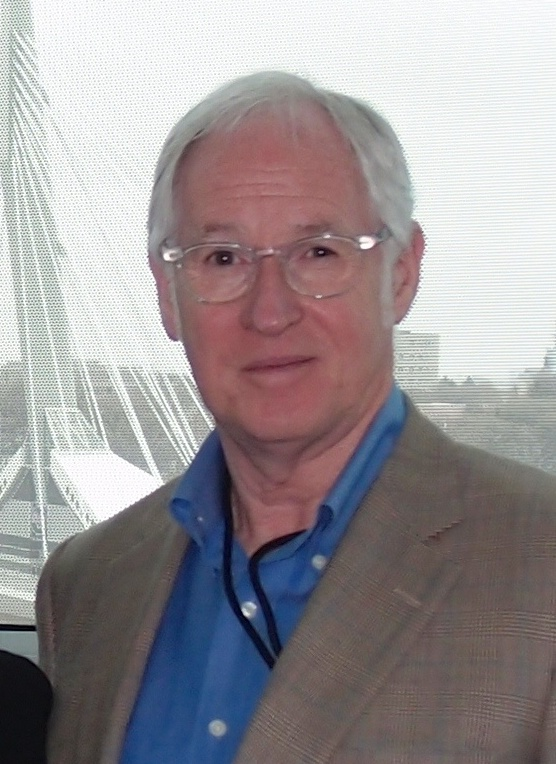
- Murray in 2014

Leader of the Opposition in Manitoba
- In office December 5, 2000 – April 9, 2006
- Preceded by: Bonnie Mitchelson
- Succeeded by: Hugh McFadyen

Leader of the Progressive Conservative Party of Manitoba
- In office November 4, 2000 – April 9, 2006
- Preceded by: Bonnie Mitchelson (Interim)
- Succeeded by: Hugh McFadyen

Member of the Legislative Assembly of Manitoba for Kirkfield Park
- In office November 21, 2000 – September 7, 2006
- Preceded by: Eric Stefanson
- Succeeded by: Sharon Blady

Personal details
- Born: 24 November 1954 (age 71) Lestock, Saskatchewan, Canada
- Party: Progressive Conservative

Stuart Murray OM (born November 24, 1954) is a former politician from Manitoba, Canada. He served as leader of the Progressive Conservative Party of Manitoba and leader of the opposition in the Manitoba legislature from 2000 to 2006. From 2006 until 2009, Murray was the President and Chief Executive Officer of the St. Boniface Hospital Research Foundation. He subsequently served as director and chief executive officer of the Canadian Museum for Human Rights from 2009 to 2014.

== Early life and career ==
Murray was born in Lestock, Saskatchewan, and raised in Punnichy in the same province. His mother, Jean Murray, was a town councillor. He studied Science at the University of Manitoba, and transferred to Ryerson Polytechnical Institute to further his studies in Architectural Science. He later worked as road manager for the rock band Blood, Sweat and Tears, and in 1982 became media director for the Canadian Opera Company.

Murray began working for Canadian Prime Minister Brian Mulroney in 1985. He moved to Winnipeg, Manitoba in 1989 after being named vice-president of the family-owned Domo Gasoline Corporation, and became its CEO and president four years later. Murray was also an organizer for the Manitoba Progressive Conservative Party in the 1990, 1995 and 1999 elections, and supported Kim Campbell's successful bid to succeed Mulroney as leader of the Progressive Conservative Party of Canada in 1993.

Murray was appointed to the board of Canadian National Railways in 1991, and served for one term. He was a founding member of the Manitoba Entertainment Complex Group (MEC) in 1994, and chaired the successful World Hockey Junior Championship in 1999. In recognition of their contribution, he and his team were each awarded the Order of the Buffalo Hunt, one of Manitoba’s highest honours.

== Provincial politician ==
After eleven years in power, the Manitoba Progressive Conservatives were defeated by Gary Doer's New Democratic Party in the 1999 election. Gary Filmon, the party's leader since 1983, stepped down in 2000.

Murray soon emerged as the party establishment's preferred choice to succeed Filmon as leader. Darren Praznik considered running against him, but withdrew several months before the convention because of fundraising difficulties. Murray was acclaimed as party leader in November 2000, and won a by-election in Kirkfield Park shortly thereafter. On December 5, he was sworn in as leader of the opposition. He criticized the New Democratic Party's 2001 budget for increased government spending, and called for significant tax cuts. He also argued the NDP was too close to provincial labour unions. Murray held progressive views on some social issues, and supported the principle of gay adoption rights late 2001.

Murray was criticized for hiring Taras Sokolyk as an advisor in 2002 without informing his caucus. Sokolyk had previously been implicated in a vote-manipulation scheme involving the Independent Native Voice party, and was largely discredited as a political figure. Murray later spoke at a Winnipeg rally held in support of the 2003 invasion of Iraq.

Murray led the Progressive Conservatives in the 2003 provincial election. His health strategy called for the government to purchase more surgeries and diagnostic services at private clinics, with the intent of reducing waiting times. He also promised to reintroduce workfare laws and to cancel the planned University College of the North, using the savings for tax cuts. Murray argued that provincial laws were skewed in favour of labour unions, and considered introducing right-to-work legislation. His most radical proposal was to eliminate the taxation powers of local school boards.

Gary Doer's NDP government was re-elected, and Murray's Conservatives slipped to 36.31% of the popular vote and 20 seats in the 57-member legislature. This was the party's worst showing since 1953. The NDP made historic inroads in south-end Winnipeg, while the Progressive Conservative Party's support was largely concentrated in the rural south of the province. A post-election editorial in the Winnipeg Free Press described Murray as "pleasant and even-tempered" but noted that he "did not make a deep impression on the public either by his work in the legislature or in the election campaign".

Murray continued as party leader after the election. He recommended adopting Generally Accepted Accounting Principles (GAAP) for determining Manitoba's budget, and called for provincial whistleblower protection legislation. He endorsed the new Conservative Party of Canada in 2004, and campaigned on behalf of Steven Fletcher in the 2004 federal election. Despite concerns about Murray's leadership, the Manitoba Progressive Conservatives voted overwhelmingly against a leadership review in November 2004.

In early 2004-05, Manitoba's labour-managed Crocus Investment Fund stopped trading and was forced into receivership after reports that it had misled shareholders and overstated the values of its assets. Doer's government was accused of improper oversight of the fund due to its ties to labour interests, and the resulting scandal initially threatened to damage the NDP's credibility. Instead, it grew to encompass the Progressive Conservatives as well. Murray acknowledged that the Progressive Conservatives had received reports of irregularities at Crocus as early as 2002, but refrained from criticism after assurances from party advisers that the fund was in proper order. These admissions may have prevented Murray from exploiting the scandal to his party's advantage; the NDP's popularity increased over the PCs increased in the summer of 2005.

On November 5, 2005, a leadership review motion at the Progressive Conservative Party's annual general meeting received 55% support from delegates. Murray acknowledged the vote as disappointing, and called for a leadership convention to be held in light of the close result. He announced on November 14 that he would not be a candidate to succeed himself, and that he would return to the private sector after a new leader was selected.

Murray continued to lead the Progressive Conservatives in the legislature until the new leader was chosen. In late November 2005, he said that he would be willing to accept private MRI clinics in the province. He did not attend the Progressive Conservative leadership convention in April 2006, which chose Hugh McFadyen as his successor.

== After politics ==
Murray resigned as MLA for Kirkfield Park on September 7, 2006. One day later, he was introduced as the new President and Chief Executive Officer for the St. Boniface Hospital Research Foundation in Winnipeg. He held this position until 2009, and during this time, he hosted a weekly radio program on CJOB called The Health Report. In late summer of 2009, Murray was named the inaugural Director and Chief Executive Officer of the Canadian Museum for Human Rights in Winnipeg, Manitoba. In 2016, Murray was appointed by the provincial government to the board of Manitoba Liquor & Lotteries Corporation. He wrote to the provincial government in 2019, asking that his position on the board not be renewed. Murray was then appointed co-chair of Manitoba 150, along with Monique Lacoste.

In late summer of 2009, Murray was named the inaugural Director and Chief Executive Officer of the Canadian Museum for Human Rights in Winnipeg, Manitoba. He did not have his contract renewed in October 2014 after his controversial inauguration of the museum, including having only 5 of 11 galleries open for viewing.

Murray launched the podcast Humans, on Rights in January 2021. Its mission is to raise awareness of local grassroots human rights issues and events and profile the people and the organizations advocating or educating to make a difference.

== Honours ==
In 2002, Murray was awarded the Queen Elizabeth II Golden Jubilee Medal. In 2012, he was awarded the Queen Elizabeth II Diamond Jubilee Medal. Murray was appointed as Honorary Colonel of 17 Wing in January 2018, and reappointed in December 2020. He received the Order of Manitoba on September 10, 2020. In 2022 he was awarded the Queen Elizabeth II Platinum Jubilee Medal.

== Electoral record ==
2003 Manitoba general election: Kirkfield Park
Party	Candidate	Votes	%	±%	Expenditures
Progressive Conservative	Stuart Murray	4,294	46.72	-7.22	$20,826.03
New Democratic	Dennis Kshyk	2,855	31.06	+12.40	$4,760.05
Liberal	Brian Head	2,042	22.22	-4.42	$16,471.01
Total valid votes		9,191	99.73		
Total rejected ballots		25	0.27	-0.04	
Turnout		9,216	61.44	+6.57	
Eligible voters		15,000			
Progressive Conservative hold		Swing		-9.81	

Manitoba provincial by-election, November 21, 2000: Kirkfield Park Resignation of Eric Stefanson
Party	Candidate	Votes	%	±%	Expenditures
Progressive Conservative	Stuart Murray	4,369	53.94	+0.70	$9,841
Liberal	Vic Wieler	2,158	26.64	+6.54	$4,355
New Democratic	Dawn Thompson	1,512	18.67	-8.00	$4,291
Libertarian	Dennis Rice	61	0.75		$0.00
Total valid votes		8,100	99.69		
Total rejected ballots		25	0.31	-0.27	
Turnout		8,125	54.87	-21.81	
Eligible voters		14,809			
Progressive Conservative hold		Swing		-2.92	

All electoral information is taken from Elections Manitoba. Provincial expenditures refer to candidate expenses.

== Notes ==
- Some of Murray's biographical information is taken from a webpage formerly hosted by the Manitoba Progressive Conservative Party (no longer available online). All electoral data is taken from Elections Manitoba. Expenditures refer to individual candidate expenses.
