= David Newman (politician) =

Canadian politician (born 1944)

- Born: David Gerald Newman; August 18, 1944 (age 82); Winnipeg, Manitoba
- Occupation: lawyer

David Gerald Newman, KC (born August 18, 1944) is a lawyer and former politician in Winnipeg, Manitoba. Since December 1999, after service in public office, he returned to private practice at the law firm Pitblado LLP. Newman serves as an advocate, negotiator and dispute resolver. Newman serves as a facilitator of restorative justice processes and as an educator and servant leader in the field of peace, conflict resolution and human rights.

== Early life and education ==
The son of Walter C. Newman and Jean MacHray, he was born in Winnipeg, Manitoba and educated at the University of Manitoba and Dalhousie University, receiving an LL.B. from the latter institution in 1968. He joined the law firm of Newman, MacLean in 1968, and became a partner in 1973. He was called to the Manitoba bar in 1969. Newman founded the firm of Newman & Company in 1978, and was a senior partner in Pitblado and Hoskin (now Pitblado LLP) from 1985 to 1995, serving as its Managing Partner 1987-88 and Chairman after 1989-95. He also served as Chair of the Manitoba Chamber of Commerce in 1989-90, and President of the Rotary Club of Winnipeg 1994-95 and co-founder and vice-chair 2003 and co-chair since 2009 of Rotary International District 5550 World Peace Partners. In 1970, Newman married Barbara Sherwood.

== Career ==
Newman served as a member of the Legislative Assembly of Manitoba for Riel Constituency as a Progressive Conservative from 1995 to 1999, and was a cabinet minister from 1997 to 1999.

In 1996, as legislative assistant to the Minister of Justice, Newman chaired a task force looking into the restructuring of Manitoba's civil justice system. The Manitoba Civil Justice Review Task Force Report September 1996 resulted.

He entered cabinet on January 6, 1997, serving as Manitoba Minister of Energy and Mines and Minister of Northern Affairs, with responsibility for Native Affairs, the Communities Economic Development Fund Act and the Manitoba Hydro Act.

Newman returned to his legal practice in 1999 after his service as an elected official, with Pitblado LLP. He was named Queen's Counsel in 1999.

== Awards ==
Newman has been honoured for his work as a servant leader through some of the following awards:

- Canada 125 Commemorative Medal (1992) for volunteer service to compatriots, community and Canada
- Harry Mardon Award for outstanding service by a director to the Manitoba Chambers of Commerce (2007)
- 2008 Weldon Award for Unselfish Public Service from the Dalhousie Law Alumni Association
- Queen Elizabeth II Diamond Jubilee Medal 2012
