= Charleswood (electoral district) =

Defunct provincial electoral district in Manitoba, Canada

Coordinates: 49.854°N 97.295°W

Manitoba electoral district
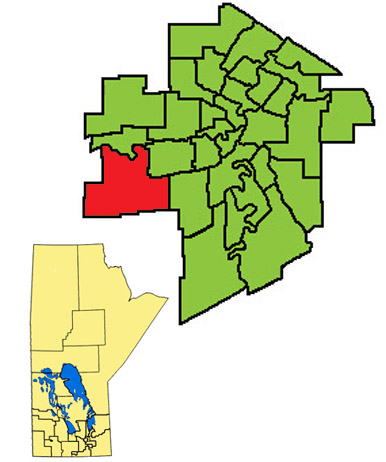

Defunct provincial electoral district
- Legislature: Legislative Assembly of Manitoba
- District created: 1968
- First contested: 1969
- Last contested: 2016

Charleswood was a provincial electoral district of Manitoba, Canada. It was created by redistribution in 1968, and formally existed from the provincial election of 1969 until that of 2019. The riding was in the westernmost tip of Manitoba's capital and largest city, Winnipeg.

Charleswood was bordered to the east by Tuxedo and Fort Whyte, to the north by Kirkfield Park, and to the south and west by the rural riding of Morris.

Charleswood's population in 1996 was 20,262. The riding's character is middle- and upper-middle class: in 1999, the average family income was $70,417, and the unemployment rate was 5.20%. Eleven per cent of the riding's residents are immigrants, with over half being of German origin.

The service sector accounts for 15% of Charleswood's industry, with a further 12% in the retail trade and 11% in health and social sciences.

Members of the Progressive Conservative Party represented Charleswood throughout its existence. During his term as Premier of Manitoba, from 1977 to 1981, Sterling Lyon represented Charleswood.

== Members of the Legislative Assembly ==
Assembly	Years	Member	Party
Riding created from Fort Garry and River Heights
29th	1969–1973	Arthur Moug	Progressive Conservative
30th	1973–1977	Arthur Moug	Progressive Conservative
31st	1977–1981	Sterling Lyon	Progressive Conservative
32nd	1981–1986	Sterling Lyon	Progressive Conservative
33rd	1986–1988	Jim Ernst	Progressive Conservative
34th	1988–1990	Jim Ernst	Progressive Conservative
35th	1990–1995	Jim Ernst	Progressive Conservative
36th	1995–1997	Jim Ernst	Progressive Conservative
36th	1997–1999	Myrna Driedger	Progressive Conservative
37th	1999–2003	Myrna Driedger	Progressive Conservative
38th	2003–2006	Myrna Driedger	Progressive Conservative
39th	2007–2011	Myrna Driedger	Progressive Conservative
40th	2011–2016	Myrna Driedger	Progressive Conservative
41st	2016–2019	Myrna Driedger	Progressive Conservative
Riding abolished into Roblin

== Electoral results ==
=== 1969 ===
1969 Manitoba general election
Party	Candidate	Votes	%
Progressive Conservative	Arthur Moug	3,401	47.99
Liberal	Duncan Edmonds	2,361	33.31
New Democratic	John Hilgenga	1,325	18.70
Total valid votes		7,087	99.72
Total rejected ballots		20	0.28
Turnout		7,107	68.17
Eligible voters		10,426	

=== 1973 ===
1973 Manitoba general election
Party	Candidate	Votes	%	±%
Progressive Conservative	Arthur Moug	6,180	46.85	-1.14
New Democratic	Roy Benson	3,554	26.94	+8.25
Liberal	Jim Spencer	3,456	26.20	-7.11
Total valid votes		13,190	99.69	
Total rejected ballots		41	0.31	+0.03
Turnout		13,231	81.96	+13.80
Eligible voters		16,143		
Progressive Conservative hold		Swing		-4.69

=== 1977 ===
1977 Manitoba general election
Party	Candidate	Votes	%	±%
Progressive Conservative	Sterling Lyon	10,559	64.91	+18.05
New Democratic	Maureen Hemphill	4,216	25.92	-1.03
Liberal	Beverly Riley	1,493	9.18	-17.02
Total valid votes		16,268	99.81	
Total rejected ballots		31	0.19	-0.12
Turnout		16,299	78.50	-3.46
Eligible voters		20,763		
Progressive Conservative hold		Swing		+9.54

=== 1981 ===
1981 Manitoba general election
Party	Candidate	Votes	%	±%
Progressive Conservative	Sterling Lyon	6,334	58.77	-6.13
New Democratic	Toni Vosters	3,243	30.09	4.18
Liberal	Ken Brown	969	8.99	-0.19
Progressive	Demetre Mastoris	231	2.14	–
Total valid votes		10,777	–	–
Rejected		12	–	
Eligible voters / Turnout		14,454	74.64	-3.86
Source(s) Source: Manitoba. Chief Electoral Officer (1999). Statement of Votes for the 37th Provincial General Election, September 21, 1999 (PDF) (Report). Winnipeg: Elections Manitoba.

=== 1986 ===
1986 Manitoba general election
Party	Candidate	Votes	%	±%
Progressive Conservative	Jim Ernst	6,524	56.43	-2.34
New Democratic	Mike MacIsaac	2,826	24.44	-5.65
Liberal	Shari Nelson	2,211	19.12	10.13
Total valid votes		11,561	–	–
Rejected		24	–	
Eligible voters / Turnout		16,665	69.52	-5.13
Source(s) Source: Manitoba. Chief Electoral Officer (1999). Statement of Votes for the 37th Provincial General Election, September 21, 1999 (PDF) (Report). Winnipeg: Elections Manitoba.

=== 1988 ===
1988 Manitoba general election
Party	Candidate	Votes	%	±%
Progressive Conservative	Jim Ernst	6,670	48.13	-8.30
Liberal	Shan Nelson	5,850	42.21	23.09
New Democratic	Bruno Zimmer	1,180	8.51	-15.93
Independent	David Hollins	158	1.14	–
Total valid votes		13,858	–	–
Rejected		15	–	
Eligible voters / Turnout		17,328	80.06	10.54
Source(s) Source: Manitoba. Chief Electoral Officer (1999). Statement of Votes for the 37th Provincial General Election, September 21, 1999 (PDF) (Report). Winnipeg: Elections Manitoba.

=== 1990 ===
1990 Manitoba general election
Party	Candidate	Votes	%	±%
Progressive Conservative	Jim Ernst	5,419	57.56	9.43
Liberal	Ken Brown	2,912	30.93	-11.28
New Democratic	Toni Vosters	1,084	11.51	3.00
Total valid votes		9,415	–	–
Rejected		14	–	
Eligible voters / Turnout		12,631	74.65	-5.41
Source(s) Source: Manitoba. Chief Electoral Officer (1999). Statement of Votes for the 37th Provincial General Election, September 21, 1999 (PDF) (Report). Winnipeg: Elections Manitoba.

=== 1995 ===
1995 Manitoba general election
Party	Candidate	Votes	%	±%
Progressive Conservative	Jim Ernst	5,737	58.00	0.44
Liberal	Gail Watson	2,958	29.90	-1.03
New Democratic	Dale Walker	1,197	12.10	0.59
Total valid votes		9,892	–	–
Rejected		37	–	
Eligible voters / Turnout		13,296	74.68	0.03
Source(s) Source: Manitoba. Chief Electoral Officer (1999). Statement of Votes for the 37th Provincial General Election, September 21, 1999 (PDF) (Report). Winnipeg: Elections Manitoba.

=== 1998 by-election ===
Manitoba provincial by-election, April 28, 1998 Resignation of Jim Ernst
Party	Candidate	Votes	%	±%
Progressive Conservative	Myrna Driedger	2,767	52.68	-5.31
Liberal	Alana McKenzie	1,524	29.02	-0.89
New Democratic	Barrie Farrow	961	18.30	6.20
Total valid votes		5,252	–	–
Rejected		N/A	–	
Eligible voters / Turnout		N/A	–	–
Source(s) Source: Manitoba. Chief Electoral Officer (1999). Statement of Votes for the 37th Provincial General Election, September 21, 1999 (PDF) (Report). Winnipeg: Elections Manitoba.

=== 1999 ===
1999 Manitoba general election
Party	Candidate	Votes	%	±%	Expenditures
Progressive Conservative	Myrna Driedger	5,437	54.72	2.04	$31,177.73
Liberal	Alana McKenzie	2,323	23.38	-5.64	$16,326.45
New Democratic	Darryl Livingstone	2,176	21.90	3.60	$717.00
Total valid votes		9,936	–	–	
Rejected		47	–		
Eligible voters / turnout		13,515	73.87	–	
Source(s) Source: Manitoba. Chief Electoral Officer (1999). Statement of Votes for the 37th Provincial General Election, September 21, 1999 (PDF) (Report). Winnipeg: Elections Manitoba.

=== 2003 ===
2003 Manitoba general election
Party	Candidate	Votes	%	±%	Expenditures
Progressive Conservative	Myrna Driedger	3,961	48.32	-6.40	$25,048.27
Liberal	Rick Ross	2,800	34.16	10.78	$25,935.42
New Democratic	Mel Willis	1,436	17.52	-4.38	$2,543.79
Total valid votes		8,197	–	–	
Rejected		43	–		
Eligible voters / turnout		13,677	60.25	-13.62	
Source(s) Source: Manitoba. Chief Electoral Officer (2003). Statement of Votes for the 38th Provincial General Election, June 3, 2003 (PDF) (Report). Winnipeg: Elections Manitoba.

=== 2007 ===
2007 Manitoba general election
Party	Candidate	Votes	%	±%	Expenditures
Progressive Conservative	Myrna Driedger	4,469	54.61	6.29	$24,822.62
New Democratic	Mel Willis	2,603	31.81	14.29	$3,884.04
Liberal	Michael Rosenberg	1,111	13.58	-20.58	$5,037.50
Total valid votes		8,183	–	–	
Rejected		38	–		
Eligible voters / turnout		13,832	59.43	-0.81	
Source(s) Source: Manitoba. Chief Electoral Officer (2007). Statement of Votes for the 39th Provincial General Election, May 22, 2007 (PDF) (Report). Winnipeg: Elections Manitoba.

=== 2011 ===
2011 Manitoba general election
Party	Candidate	Votes	%	±%	Expenditures
Progressive Conservative	Myrna Driedger	4,838	55.83	1.21	$23,063.10
New Democratic	Paula Beckta	2,601	30.01	-1.80	$5,373.80
Liberal	Matthew Ostrove	755	8.71	-4.86	$2,417.99
Green	Dirk Hoeppner	472	5.45	–	$6.81
Total valid votes		8,666	–	–	
Rejected		39	–		
Eligible voters / turnout		14,249	61.09	1.66	
Source(s) Source: Manitoba. Chief Electoral Officer (2011). Statement of Votes for the 40th Provincial General Election, October 4, 2011 (PDF) (Report). Winnipeg: Elections Manitoba. "Election Returns: 40th General Election". Elections Manitoba. 2011.

=== 2016 ===
2016 Manitoba general election
Party	Candidate	Votes	%	±%	Expenditures
Progressive Conservative	Myrna Driedger	5,298	60.67	4.84	$26,417.84
Liberal	Paul Brault	1,187	13.59	4.88	$12,500.46
New Democratic	Janna Barkman	1,168	13.37	-16.64	$4,990.15
Green	Kevin Nichols	1,080	12.37	6.92	$713.41
Total valid votes		8,733	–	–	
Rejected		97	–		
Eligible voters / turnout		13,450	65.65	4.56	
Source(s) Source: Manitoba. Chief Electoral Officer (2016). Statement of Votes for the 41st Provincial General Election, April 19, 2016 (PDF) (Report). Winnipeg: Elections Manitoba. "Election Returns: 41st General Election". Elections Manitoba. 2016.

== Previous boundaries ==
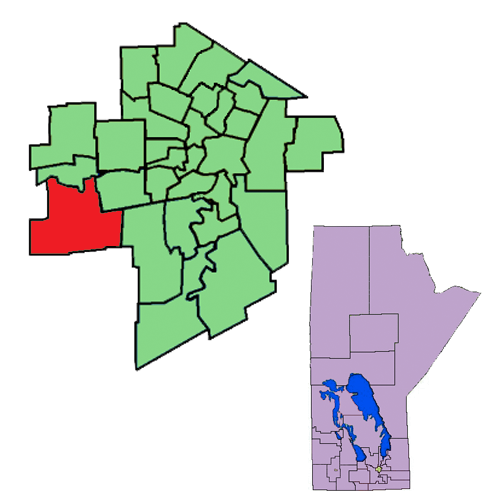
The 1999–2011 boundaries of Charleswood highlighted in red.

== See also ==
- List of Manitoba provincial electoral districts
- Canadian provincial electoral districts
