= Reginald Wightman =

Canadian politician (1899–1981)

Member of the Legislative Assembly of Manitoba for Assiniboia
- In office November 10, 1949 – June 16, 1958
- Preceded by: Ernest Draffin
- Succeeded by: Douglas Stanes

Mayor of St. James
- In office 1945–1954
- Preceded by: David Best
- Succeeded by: Thomas Burns Findlay

St. James Municipal Councillor
- In office 1962–1971
- In office 1940–1961

St. James School Board Chairman
- In office 1936–1939

Personal details
- Born: Reginald Fredrick Wightman; May 28, 1899 Nesbitt, Manitoba, Canada
- Died: January 23, 1981 (aged 81) Winnipeg, Manitoba, Canada
- Spouse: Alice Maud Thring
- Education: Manitoba University

Reginald Frederick Wightman (May 28, 1899 – January 23, 1981) was a politician in Manitoba, Canada. He served in the Legislative Assembly of Manitoba as a Liberal-Progressive from 1949 to 1958.

Wightman was born in Nesbitt, Manitoba. He was educated at Manitoba University, which later became the University of Manitoba. He worked as a pharmacist, and was the owner and operator of several pharmacies in the Winnipeg area. He began his political career at the municipal level, serving as chair of the St. James School Board for four years, and as a councillor for six years. Wightman became Mayor of St. James in 1945, and continued to serve as the mayor of the suburb even after his election to the provincial legislature. In 1928, he married Alice Maud Thring.

He was first elected to the Manitoba legislature in the 1949 provincial election, defeating incumbent Cooperative Commonwealth Federation MLA Ernest R. Draffin by 1,214 votes in the constituency of Assiniboia. He was re-elected in the 1953 election, defeating CCF challenger Alvin Mackling by 281 votes. Wightman was a backbench supporter of Douglas Campbell's government during his time in the legislature.

The Liberal-Progressives lost power following the 1958 provincial election, following a large-scale electoral redistribution. Wightman was defeated in the redistributed constituency of St. James, losing to Progressive Conservative Douglas Stanes by 476 votes.

Wightman returned to municipal politics after his provincial defeat. In 1969, he became the first finance committee chair of the new city of St. James–Assiniboia.

He died in Winnipeg at the age of 81.

His son, Reginald C. Wightman, is also a public figure in Winnipeg.
