= Sturgeon Creek (disambiguation) =

Sturgeon Creek may refer to:

- Sturgeon Creek (Georgia), a tributary of the Ocmulgee River
- Sturgeon Creek (Washington)
- Sturgeon Creek, a former provincial electoral division in the Canadian province of Manitoba.
