= Ernest Draffin =

Canadian politician (1909–1982)

Ernest Richard Draffin (September 21, 1909 – December 19, 1982) was a politician in Manitoba, Canada. He served in the Legislative Assembly of Manitoba from 1945 to 1949 as a member of the social-democratic Cooperative Commonwealth Federation.

Born in Winnipeg, Manitoba, the son of Ernest Richard Draffin and Margaret McGowan, Draffin was educated at Brooklands and at the Kiwanis Night School for Boys. He began working at Canadian National Telegraphs in 1925. Originally as a messenger, he later rose to the position of Chief Timekeeper, retiring in 1973. He was a member of the Commercial Telegraphers Union of America, and served on the provincial executive of the CCF. Draffin was also active in ice hockey and soccer. Draffin also served as president of the Manitoba Football Association, later the Manitoba Soccer Association, helped found the Manitoba Sports Federation and was technical director for soccer at the 1967 Pan American Games.

He was elected to the Manitoba legislature in the 1945 provincial election, defeating Progressive Conservative candidate David Best by 180 votes in the suburban Winnipeg constituency of Assiniboia. He served as an opposition member in the legislature for the next four years.

The CCF suffered an electoral setback in the 1949 provincial election, and Draffin lost his seat to Liberal-Progressive candidate Reginald Wightman by 1,214 votes.

He campaigned in the St. Andrews constituency in the 1953 provincial election, but finished a poor third against Liberal-Progressive Thomas Hillhouse. In the 1958 election, he finished third in Fort Rouge against Progressive Conservative Gurney Evans.

Draffin ran for the House of Commons of Canada in the 1953 Canadian election, as a candidate of the federal Cooperative Commonwealth Federation. He finished third in Winnipeg South against Progressive Conservative Owen C. Trainor. He also campaigned for the Winnipeg City Council in the 1953 municipal election, but was defeated in the city's predominantly middle-class first ward.

Draffin was inducted into the Manitoba Sports Hall of Fame in 1981 in recognition of his soccer playing abilities and contributions to the sport.

He died in Winnipeg at the age of 73.
