= Minister of Business Development and Tourism (Manitoba) =

The Minister of Business Development and Tourism was a cabinet position in the province of Manitoba, Canada.

Originally created in 1978 as the Minister of Economic Development, the position received additional responsibilities for tourism the following year, changing it to Economic Development and Tourism. It was again renamed in 1983, to Business Development and Tourism.

In 1988, the position was merged with the Industry, Trade and Technology (ITT) portfolio to create the new position of Industry, Trade and Tourism. The ITT had previously been founded in 1983 by the Howard Pawley administration and was led by ministers Eugene Kostyra (1983-1986) and Vic Schroeder (1986-1988).

== List of ministers of business development and tourism ==
Name	Party	Took office	Left office	Title
Frank Johnston	Progressive Conservative	October 20, 1978	November 15, 1979	Minister of Economic Development
Frank Johnston	Progressive Conservative	November 15, 1979	November 30, 1981	Minister of Economic Development and Tourism
Muriel Smith	New Democratic Party	November 30, 1981	November 4, 1983	Minister for Economic Development and Tourism
Sam Uskiw	New Democratic Party	November 4, 1983	January 30, 1985	
Jerry Storie	New Democratic Party	January 30, 1985	April 17, 1986	Minister responsible for Business Development and Tourism (not a full cabinet portfolio)
Maureen Hemphill	New Democratic Party	April 17, 1986	September 21, 1987	
Alvin Mackling	New Democratic Party	September 21, 1987	May 9, 1988	
