= Aimé Bénard =

Canadian politician

The Honourable Aimé Bénard
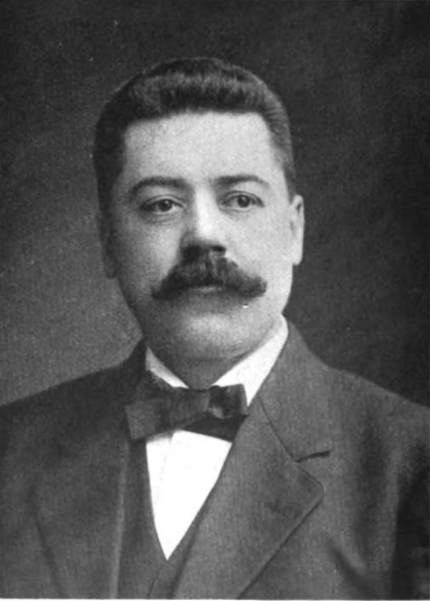

Canadian Senator from Manitoba
- In office September 3, 1917 – January 8, 1938
- Appointed by: Robert Borden

Member of the Legislative Assembly of Manitoba for Iberville
- In office 1914–1917
- Preceded by: Riding created
- Succeeded by: Arthur Boivin

Member of the Legislative Assembly of Manitoba for Assiniboia
- In office 1907–1914
- Preceded by: Joseph Prefontaine
- Succeeded by: John Thomas Haig

Personal details
- Born: November 21, 1873 Henryville, Quebec, Canada
- Died: January 8, 1938 (aged 64)
- Party: Conservative

Aimé Bénard (November 21, 1873 – January 8, 1938) was a politician in Manitoba, Canada. He served as interim leader of the provincial Conservatives in 1915, and was later appointed to the Senate of Canada.

== Life and career ==
Bénard was born in Henryville, Quebec, and was educated at the normal school in that community. He later moved to Manitoba, and worked as a financial agent. He was first elected to the Legislative Assembly of Manitoba in the 1907 provincial election, defeating Liberal incumbent Joseph H. Prefontaine by 339 votes. The Conservatives won this election, and Bénard served in the legislature as a government backbencher. He was re-elected for Assiniboia in the 1910 election, and for Iberville in the 1914 campaign.

Conservative premier Rodmond Roblin was forced to resign in 1915, amid a serious corruption scandal. Another election was called, which the Liberals won with a landslide majority. Bénard was one of only five Tories returned to the legislature. His re-election was primarily due to the Conservative Party's continued popularity in francophone areas of the province. The Conservatives were more supportive of francophone education rights than the Liberals, and received support from this community; four of the party's five legislators were francophone.

Bénard was chosen as the Conservative Party's interim leader shortly after the election. The party chose another francophone, Albert Prefontaine, as its house leader in 1916.

Bénard was appointed to the Canadian Senate on September 3, 1917, on the recommendation of Prime Minister Robert Borden. He served in the Senate until his death.
