= George Minaker =

Canadian politician (1937–2012)

Member of Parliament for Winnipeg—St. James
- In office 1984–1988
- Succeeded by: John Harvard

Member of the Legislative Assembly of Manitoba for St. James
- In office 1973–1981

Personal details
- Born: September 17, 1937 Morris, Manitoba, Canada
- Died: April 30, 2012 (aged 74) Ottawa, Ontario, Canada
- Party: Progressive Conservative Party of Manitoba, Progressive Conservative Party of Canada
- Profession: engineer

Clement George Minaker (September 17, 1937 – April 30, 2012) was a politician in Manitoba, Canada. He was a Progressive Conservative member of the Legislative Assembly of Manitoba from 1973 to 1981, and served in the cabinet of Premier Sterling Lyon. Subsequently, he was a Progressive Conservative member of the House of Commons of Canada from 1984 to 1988.

Educated at the University of Manitoba, Minaker worked as a professional engineer after graduation. He was elected as an alderman in St. James in 1966, and was re-elected two years later for the new city of St. James–Assiniboia. In 1969, he was chosen as chair of the city's property committee. He was elected as a councillor in the City of Winnipeg in 1971, following the decision of Edward Schreyer's NDP government to amalgamate the city.

The amalgamation was unpopular with many St. James residents, and Minaker successfully used the issue to win election to the Manitoba Legislature in the riding of the same name, defeating NDP incumbent Al Mackling in the provincial election of 1973 by 374 votes. He was re-elected by a greater margin (besting Curtis Nordman of the NDP by 2346 votes) in the 1977 election, in which the Tories under Sterling Lyon won a majority government. Minaker entered cabinet on November 15, 1979 as Minister of Community Services and Corrections. The NDP replaced the PCs' majority with one of their own in 1981, and Minaker lost his own riding to Al Mackling by 779 votes.

He then turned to federal politics, and won the riding of Winnipeg—St. James for the federal Progressive Conservatives in the 1984 Canadian federal election. He defeated the second-place candidate, Lissa Donner of the New Democratic Party, by 2680 votes. He was not appointed to Prime Minister Brian Mulroney's cabinet, and lost to Liberal challenger John Harvard in 1988 by 1702 votes after representing the district for the 33rd Canadian Parliament. He did not return to politics after this time.

After leaving politics, Minaker worked for the National Transportation Agency in Ottawa. He died in Ottawa in 2012 at the age of 74.
