= George William Johnson (politician) =

Canadian politician

Member of the Manitoba Assembly for Assiniboia
- In office 1959–1962
- Preceded by: Donovan Swailes
- Succeeded by: Stephen Patrick
- Majority: 217

Personal details
- Born: July 10, 1892 Stratford, Ontario, Canada
- Died: April 26, 1973 (aged 80)
- Party: Progressive Conservative Party of Manitoba

George William Johnson (July 10, 1892 in Stratford, Ontario – April 26, 1973) was a politician in Manitoba, Canada. He served in the Legislative Assembly of Manitoba from 1959 to 1962, representing the Winnipeg riding of Assiniboia for the Progressive Conservative Party.

== Private life ==
Johnson was educated in Stratford and moved to the Neepawa area of Manitoba in 1917 and then to Winnipeg in 1918. He operated a butcher shop until 1929, when he joined Canada Safeway. From 1947 to 1950, he worked for Safeway in Vancouver. He retired from Safeway in 1959. Johnson also served on the city council for St. James, the St. James school board and the St. James Chamber of Commerce. He died in Winnipeg at the age of 80.

== Political career ==
He first campaigned for the Manitoba legislature in the 1958 provincial election, but lost to CCF incumbent Donovan Swailes by 131 votes in Assiniboia. He ran again in the 1959 election and defeated Swailes by 217 votes, as the Progressive Conservatives won a majority government under Dufferin Roblin.

Johnson was a backbench supporter of Roblin's government during his time in the legislature. He lost to Liberal Stephen Patrick by 239 votes in the 1962 provincial election.
