= James Aiken (politician) =

Canadian politician (1888–1974)

James Aiken (July 22, 1888 – November 4, 1974) was a politician in Manitoba, Canada. He served in the Legislative Assembly of Manitoba from 1936 to 1941, as a member of the Manitoba Cooperative Commonwealth Federation.

Aiken was born in Aberdeen, Scotland, the son of Alexander Aiken and Jane Anderson Don, and was educated at Gordon's College in the city. He came to Canada in 1912, and worked as a printer. In 1913, Aiken married Mabel Marguerite Leatham. He was a trustee on the St. James School Board from 1930 to 1935.

He was elected to the Manitoba legislature in the 1936 provincial election, defeating three opponents in the Winnipeg-area constituency of Assinboia. He served with his party on the opposition benches until 1940, when the CCF entered the province's wartime coalition government.

He ran for re-election in the 1941 election, but lost to David Best, a Conservative who opposed the coalition, by 74 votes.

After leaving politics, Aikens became an inspector in the Manitoba Department of Labor. In 1944, he was named acting director of apprenticeship for the province.
