= Edwin Bourke =

Canadian politician

Edwin Bourke (September 19, 1836 – March 18, 1915) was a farmer and political figure in Manitoba. He represented St. James from 1870 to 1878 in the Legislative Assembly of Manitoba.

He was born in the Red River Settlement, the son of John Palmer Bourke, a native of Ireland, and Nancy Campbell. Bourke grew up on the Hay Field Farm in St. James, purchased by his father from the Hudson's Bay Company; he later inherited the farm. He married Isabella Hallett in 1863. Bourke served as captain leading a group of volunteers during the Fenian raids. He later served on the council for St. James and as a member of the local school board. Bourke died in Ocean Park, California and was buried in Winnipeg.
