= Frank Johnston (politician) =

Canadian politician (1929–2017)

John Franklin "Frank" Johnston (September 3, 1929 – February 7, 2017) was a politician in Manitoba, Canada. He served as a member of the Legislative Assembly of Manitoba from 1969 to 1988, and as a cabinet minister in the Progressive Conservative government of Sterling Lyon.

== Career ==
Johnston began his political career at the municipal level, serving as an alderman in the City of St. James (now part of Winnipeg) from 1964 to 1966, and in the successor city of St. James-Assiniboia from 1968 to 1972. He was chosen as the city's deputy mayor in 1968, and also chaired the urban renewal committee. He was also active in freemasonry, and was a member of the Northwest Commercial Travellers Association.

He was first elected to the Manitoba legislature in the provincial election of 1969, defeating Liberal Robert Chipman by 530 votes in the Winnipeg riding of Sturgeon Creek. This election was the first in Manitoba's history won by the social democratic New Democratic Party, and Johnston sat in the opposition benches. In the 1973 election, he was re-elected by an increased margin.

Johnston was re-elected again in the 1977 election, in which the Progressive Conservatives won a majority government. From October 24, 1977 to October 20, 1978, he was a minister without portfolio responsible for the Manitoba Housing and Renewal Corporation. On October 20, 1978, he was promoted to Minister of Economic Development; on November 15, 1981, this portfolio was changed to Economic Development and Tourism.

The Progressive Conservatives were defeated in the 1981 election, and Johnston was re-elected with a reduced plurality. He was re-elected in the 1986 election, but ironically lost to Liberal challenger Iva Yeo in 1988, just as the Progressive Conservatives formed a minority government under Gary Filmon. He never sought a return to political life.

Johnston was an aggressively partisan MLA, and frequently referred to New Democrats as communists in legislative debates. His son, Scott Johnston, was elected as an MLA in the 2016 Manitoba general election.

Johnston's passing was announced publicly February 8, 2017 by Premier Brian Pallister.
