= Bonnie Korzeniowski =

Canadian politician (1941–2019)

Member of the Legislative Assembly of Manitoba for St. James
- In office September 21, 1999 – October 4, 2011
- Preceded by: MaryAnn Mihychuk
- Succeeded by: Deanne Crothers

Personal details
- Born: October 5, 1941 Winnipeg, Manitoba
- Died: October 15, 2019 (aged 78) Winnipeg, Manitoba
- Party: New Democratic Party
- Spouse: Gerald Korzeniowski

Bonnie Korzeniowski (October 5, 1941 – October 15, 2019) was a politician in Manitoba, Canada. She was a member of the Legislative Assembly of Manitoba from 1999 to 2011.

Korzeniowski holds both Bachelor of Social Work and Master of Science in Administration degrees. She was a social worker for twenty years before entering political life, and worked in psychogeriatrics for twelve years at the Deer Lodge Centre in Winnipeg. Korzeniowski has also been involved in organizations such as the Deer Lodge United Church, the Manitoba Human Rights Committee and the Manitoba Alzheimer's Society. Before her election, she served as chair of Health Care Professionals for the Deer Lodge Centre of the Professional Institute of Public Service in Canada.

Korzeniowski was elected to the Manitoba legislature in the 1999 provincial election as a New Democrat in the west Winnipeg riding of St. James, defeating incumbent Progressive Conservative Gerry McAlpine by 4483 votes to 3845. She was re-elected by a wider margin in 2003 election.

She supported Bill Blaikie's campaign for the leadership of the federal New Democratic Party in 2003. She was re-elected again in the 2007 provincial election.

Korzeniowski served as the province's special envoy for military affairs from February 2008 to June 2013. She assumed that role while still an MLA and continued to receive the same full salary even after she did not run for reelection in 2011.
