= Samuel Thompson (Canadian politician) =

Canadian politician (1845–1909)

Samuel Jacob Thompson (September 2, 1845 – December 2, 1909) was a farmer, veterinarian and political figure in Manitoba. He represented Norfolk from 1886 to 1892 in the Legislative Assembly of Manitoba as a Liberal.

Thompson was born on September 2, 1845, near Caledonia, Ontario, the son of Jacob Thompson, a native of Ireland, and was educated there and at the Ontario Veterinary College. He practised as a veterinary surgeon in Brantford and then came to Manitoba in 1881, settling in Carberry. In 1869, he married Margaret Farewell. He operated a hotel and livery there until 1884, continuing to farm in the area. After leaving politics, he served as provincial veterinarian. He moved to St. James-Assiniboia in 1899, serving as its reeve. He died on December 2, 1909, aged 64, in Winnipeg.
