= Scott Johnston =

Canadian politician

Minister of Seniors and Long-term Care
- In office January 18, 2022 – October 18, 2023
- Premier: Heather Stefanson
- Preceded by: Portfolio Created
- Succeeded by: Uzoma Asagwara

Member of the Legislative Assembly of Manitoba for Assiniboia
- In office September 10, 2019 – October 3, 2023
- Preceded by: Steven Fletcher
- Succeeded by: Nellie Kennedy

Member of the Legislative Assembly of Manitoba for St. James
- In office April 19, 2016 – August 12, 2019
- Preceded by: Deanne Crothers
- Succeeded by: Adrien Sala

Personal details
- Born: January 4, 1957 (age 69)
- Party: Progressive Conservative

Scott Johnston is a Canadian provincial politician, who was elected to the Legislative Assembly of Manitoba in the 2016 Manitoba general election. He represented the electoral district of Assiniboia as a member of the Progressive Conservative Party of Manitoba. He served as the Minister of Seniors and Long-term Care late in his term as MLA.

Johnston was first was elected as the Member of the Legislative Assembly of Manitoba for the riding of St. James in the 2016 election. He was reelected in the 2019 Manitoba general election, in which he moved to the neighbouring district of Assiniboia.

Johnston's father, Frank Johnston, was an MLA from 1969 to 1988, and served as a cabinet minister in the Progressive Conservative government of Sterling Lyon.

He lost his seat to Manitoba New Democratic challenger Nellie Kennedy in the 2023 Manitoba general election.

== Electoral record ==
2023 Manitoba general election: Assiniboia
Party	Candidate	Votes	%	±%	Expenditures
New Democratic	Nellie Kennedy	4,722	50.02	+14.55	$22,718.51
Progressive Conservative	Scott Johnston	3,806	40.31	-3.94	$47,635.37
Liberal	Charles Ward	913	9.67	-3.76	$14,259.80
Total valid votes/expense limit		9,441	99.55	–	$66,377.00
Total rejected and declined ballots		43	0.45	–	
Turnout		9,484	55.70	+1.00	
Eligible voters		17,028			
New Democratic gain from Progressive Conservative		Swing		+9.25	
Source(s) Source: Elections Manitoba

2019 Manitoba general election: Assiniboia
Party	Candidate	Votes	%	±%	Expenditures
Progressive Conservative	Scott Johnston	4,108	44.25	-0.8	$28,181.41
New Democratic	Joe McKellep	3,292	35.46	+6.9	$16,473.46
Liberal	Jeff Anderson	1,247	13.43	-5.4	$3,838.59
Green	John Delaat	636	6.85	-0.5	$0.00
Total valid votes		9,283	99.37	–	
Rejected		59	0.63		
Turnout		9,342	54.70		
Eligible voters		17,080			
Progressive Conservative hold		Swing		-3.9	
Source(s) Source: Manitoba. Chief Electoral Officer (2019). Statement of Votes for the 42nd Provincial General Election, September 10, 2019 (PDF) (Report). Winnipeg: Elections Manitoba. "Candidate Election Returns". Elections Manitoba. Elections Manitoba.
