= Iva Yeo =

Canadian politician

Iva Yeo (born June 5, 1939 in Winnipeg, Manitoba) is a politician in Manitoba, Canada. She was a member of the Legislative Assembly of Manitoba from 1988 to 1990, representing the Winnipeg riding of Sturgeon Creek for the Manitoba Liberal Party.

== Background ==
The daughter of Arthur W.S. Hay and Irene Stewart, she was educated at the Winnipeg General Hospital and the University of Saskatchewan, and worked as a nurse educator at the St. Boniface School for Practical Nurses, as well as working in student affairs at St. Boniface Schools of Nursing. In 1961, she married Dr. Thomas Archie Yeo.

== Political career ==
She served as a school trustee in the 1980s, in the district of Silver Heights-Booth. In the provincial election of 1988, she defeated incumbent Progressive Conservative Frank Johnston by 659 votes in Sturgeon Creek. The Manitoba Liberals increased their parliamentary representation from one to twenty in this election, and Yeo sat in the official opposition for the next two years. In the 1990 provincial election, she lost to Tory Gerry McAlpine by 769 votes amid a general loss of support for her party.

== Election results ==
1988 Manitoba general election: Sturgeon Creek
Party	Candidate	Votes	%	±%
Liberal	Iva Yeo	4,833	47.45	+30.55
Progressive Conservative	Frank Johnston	4,174	40.98	-14.19
New Democratic	Len Sawatsky	993	9.75	-16.79
Confederation of Regions	Hugh Buskell	158	1.55	n/a
Communist	Nigel Hanrahan	27	0.27	n/a
Total valid votes		10,185	100.00	
Rejected ballots		19		
Turnout		10,204	76.73	
Eligible voters		13,298		
Liberal gain from Progressive Conservative		Swing		+22.37
Source: Elections Manitoba

1990 Manitoba general election: Sturgeon Creek
Party	Candidate	Votes	%	±%
Progressive Conservative	Gerry McAlpine	4,676	46.51	+5.53
Liberal	Iva Yeo	3,907	38.86	-8.59
New Democratic	Andrew Swan	1,471	14.63	+4.88
Turnout		10,093	74.22	-2.51
Progressive Conservative gain from Liberal		Swing		+7.06
Source: Elections Manitoba
