= Ed Mandrake =

Canadian politician

Ed Mandrake, circa 2000

Edward Charles "Ed" Mandrake (born October 1, 1938 in Ethelbert, Manitoba – May 2, 2010) was a politician in Manitoba, Canada. He was a member of the Legislative Assembly of Manitoba from 1988 to 1990, representing the west-end Winnipeg riding of Assiniboia for the Manitoba Liberal Party.

The son of Walter Mandrake, he was educated at the Red River Community College, receiving a certificate in motor vehicle work. He worked in vehicle body repair before entering politics. Mandrake also served with the Canadian Army which he joined in 1956, holding administrative posts in Canada and Europe. He was honourably released with the rank of Warrant Officer in 1968. In 1958, he married Marie Wiwchar.

Mandrake first ran for office in the 1988 provincial election, and defeated incumbent Progressive Conservative Ric Nordman by 187 votes in Assiniboia. The Liberals increased their parliamentary representation from one seat to twenty in this election, and Mandrake sat as a member of the official opposition. Liberal support trailed off in the provincial election of 1990, and he was defeated by PC candidate Linda McIntosh. He did not seek a return to political office.

Mandrake later joined the Progressive Conservative Party of Canada. In 2003, he signed a petition opposing the party's merger with the Canadian Alliance.

He died at the Victoria General Hospital in Winnipeg at the age of 71.

== Election results ==
1988 Manitoba general election: Assiniboia
Party	Candidate	Votes	%	±%
Liberal	Ed Mandrake	3,918	44.29	+25.62
Progressive Conservative	Ric Nordman	3,731	42.18	-9.44
New Democratic	Robert Johannson	1,031	11.65	-18.06
Western Independence	Linda Cress	166	1.88	n/a
Total valid votes		8,846	100.00	-
Rejected ballots		13	–	–
Turnout		8,859	74.46	
Eligible voters		11,898		
Source: Elections Manitoba

1990 Manitoba general election: Assiniboia
Party	Candidate	Votes	%	±%
Progressive Conservative	Linda McIntosh	4,054	49.85	7.68
Liberal	Ed Mandrake	2,730	33.57	-10.72
New Democratic	Joan Johannson	1,348	16.58	4.92
Total valid votes		8,132	–	–
Rejected		18	–	
Eligible voters / turnout		11,672	69.83	-4.63
Source(s) Source: Manitoba. Chief Electoral Officer (1999). Statement of Votes for the 37th Provincial General Election, September 21, 1999 (PDF) (Report). Winnipeg: Elections Manitoba.
