= Stephen Patrick =

Canadian politician and athlete (1932–2014)

Profile
- Position: Guard

Personal information
- Born: March 24, 1932; Glenella, Manitoba, Canada
- Died: January 11, 2014 (aged 81); Winnipeg, Manitoba, Canada
- Listed height: 6 ft 2 in (1.88 m)
- Listed weight: 205 lb (93 kg)

Career history
- 1952–1964: Winnipeg Blue Bombers

Awards and highlights
- 4× Grey Cup champion (1958, 1959, 1961, 1962); 2× CFL West All-Star (1958, 1959); Manitoba Sports Hall of Fame (1988)

Stephen Clifford Patrick (né Patrebka, March 24, 1932 – January 11, 2014) was a Canadian politician and athlete. Patrick was a Liberal member of the Legislative Assembly of Manitoba from 1962 to 1977.

== Career ==
Patrick played with the Winnipeg Blue Bombers football team for thirteen years. He became President and General-Manager of Patrick Agencies Ltd. (now known as Patrick Realty Ltd.), and was a Director of the Winnipeg Real Estate Bld. and the Pioneer Fraternal Association.

He was first elected to the Manitoba legislature in the provincial election of 1962, defeating incumbent Progressive Conservative George Johnson by 239 votes in the west-end Winnipeg riding of Assiniboia. He was re-elected by a greater margin in the 1966 election, but retained his seat by only 26 votes over Tory Bill Docking in the 1969 election.

The once-dominant Manitoba Liberal Party was reduced to only five seats in the 1969 election, and dropped to four when Laurent Desjardins decided to support the New Democratic Party. Patrick was re-elected in 1973, but lost his seat to Tory candidate Norma Price in the 1977 election, amid the Liberal Party's continued decline.

== Personal life ==
The son of Alexandre and Katie Patrebka, he was educated in Glenella, at the Manitoba Teachers College and at Success Community Business College. The family anglicized their surname from Patrebka to Patrick, upon immigrating to Canada from Ukraine. In 1956, he married Marjorie June Mathieson.

Patrick's sons, James and Steve, and grandson, Nolan Patrick, played in the National Hockey League (NHL).

Patrick was inducted into the Manitoba Sports Hall of Fame and Museum in 1988. He died in 2014.
