= Douglas Stanes =

Canadian politician (1917-2001)

Member of the Legislative Assembly of Manitoba for St. James
- In office June 16, 1958 – June 25, 1969
- Preceded by: Riding established
- Succeeded by: Alvin Mackling

Personal details
- Born: Douglas Moncrieff Stanes; February 28, 1917
- Died: April 29, 2001 (aged 84)
- Party: Progressive Conservative

Douglas Moncrieff Stanes (February 28, 1917 in England – April 29, 2001) was a politician in Manitoba, Canada. He was a Progressive Conservative member of the Legislative Assembly of Manitoba from 1958 to 1969.

Stanes was a Lieutenant-Colonel of the Middlesex Regiment, and served in southeast Asia, the Middle East and Europe. In 1945–46, he served as Senior Official on Industrial Rehabilitation with the British Economic Mission in Greece. From 1955 to 1957, he served as a councillor for the City of St. James, which later became a part of Winnipeg.

He was first elected to the provincial legislature in the 1958 election, defeating Liberal incumbent Reginald Wightman by 476 votes in the riding of St. James. He was re-elected by a comfortable margin in the 1959 election (defeating future NDP cabinet minister Alvin Mackling), and by fairly comfortable margins in the elections of 1962 and 1966. On the latter occasion, he defeated Liberal candidate Lloyd Axworthy, later a prominent federal cabinet minister, by 790 votes. Despite his background, Stanes was never appointed to cabinet.

He was defeated in the 1969 provincial election, losing to Alvin Mackling of the NDP by 966 votes. He did not seek a return to the provincial legislature after this time, but was elected to the united Winnipeg city council in the municipal elections of 1971, 1974 and 1977.
