= 1963 Winnipeg municipal election =

The 1963 Winnipeg municipal election was held on October 23, 1963, to determine mayors, councillors and school trustees in the City of Winnipeg and its suburban communities. There were also referendum votes in some communities. There was no mayoral election in Winnipeg.

== Results ==
=== Winnipeg ===
Mark Danzker, David Mulligan and Edith Tennant were elected to Winnipeg City Council for the city's first ward. Lloyd Stinson, Terry Hind and William McGarva were elected for the second ward. Slaw Rebchuk, Joseph Zuken and Donovan Swailes were elected for the third ward.

=== St. Vital ===
1963 St. Vital municipal election: Mayor
Candidate	Votes	%
(x)Harry Collins	4,169	61.61
Fred Brennan	2,598	38.39
Total valid votes	6,767	100.00

1963 St. Vital municipal election: Council (four elected)
Candidate	Votes	%
(x)Florence Pierce	1,850	27.77
(x)Jack Hardy	1,835	27.54
(x)Alvin Winslow	1,557	23.37
Harold Button	622	9.34
Harry Brown	453	6.80
Dudley Smallwood	345	5.18
Total valid votes	6,662	100.00

This election was determined by a single transferable ballot. The quota for election on the first ballot was 1,333 votes; Pierce, Hardy, and Winslow were declared elected to two-year terms. At the end of the fourth transfer, Button had 1,385 votes, Brown 1,197 and Smallwood 669. Button was declared elected to a one-year term, replacing the retiring Fred Brennan.
