= Linda McIntosh =

Canadian politician (born 1943)

Member of the Legislative Assembly of Manitoba for Assiniboia
- In office September 11, 1990 – September 21, 1999
- Preceded by: Ed Mandrake
- Succeeded by: Jim Rondeau

Minister charged with administration of the Liquor Control Act
- In office February 5, 1991 – September 10, 1993
- Preceded by: James McCrae
- Succeeded by: Harold Gilleshammer

Minister of Urban Affairs
- In office September 10, 1993 – May 9, 1995
- Preceded by: Jim Ernst
- Succeeded by: Jack Reimer

Manitoba Minister of Education
- In office May 9, 1995 – February 5, 1999
- Preceded by: Clayton Manness
- Succeeded by: James McCrae

Personal details
- Born: Linda Laughlin McIntosh; 14 December 1943 (age 82) Montreal, Quebec
- Party: Progressive Conservative
- Education: University of Manitoba
- Occupation: Politician; Author; Teacher

Linda Laughlin McIntosh (born December 14, 1943) is a former politician in Manitoba, Canada. She was a member of the Legislative Assembly of Manitoba from 1990 to 1999, and a cabinet minister for most of this period. McIntosh has received the Queen Elizabeth II Golden Jubilee Medal and the Queen Elizabeth II Diamond Jubilee Medal.

== Early life ==
McIntosh was born in Montreal, Quebec. She is the daughter of Hugh Laughlin a career military officer (RCAF) and Gwen Ruth Hopper. She was educated in Canada and Europe. In 1960 she graduated and began studies at St. John's College, University of Manitoba. McIntosh graduated with honors from the Manitoba Teachers' College in 1963.

== Personal life ==
In 1988, she married Donald John McIntosh, whose nephew Hugh McFadyen is the former Leader of the Opposition in Manitoba.

Her grandfather John Bell Laughlin and her great grandfather Andrew Laughlin were also MLA’s in south western Manitoba.

== Career ==
=== Early work ===
McIntosh worked as an elementary school teacher and freelance commercial artist for several years, and was also a political commentator on CBC TV's Friday Night News "Week In Review" segment in 1985-86.

McIntosh was elected as a school trustee in the Winnipeg region of St. James-Assiniboia in 1980, and served until 1989, becoming its first female chair in 1984. She was elected to serve as president of the Manitoba Association of School Trustees in the mid-eighties. In June 1988, she was hired as Special Assistant to Progressive Conservative leader Gary Filmon, who had become Manitoba's Premier the previous month.

=== Legislature ===
McIntosh was herself elected to the Manitoba legislature in the provincial election of 1990, defeating incumbent Liberal Ed Mandrake by 1324 votes in the western Winnipeg riding of Assiniboia.

On February 5, 1991, she was named Minister of Cooperative, Consumer and Corporate Affairs, with responsibility for the Liquor Control Act.

McIntosh was appointed to the Manitoba Provincial Treasury Board on January 14, 1992 where she served for two years.

On September 10, 1993, she was transferred from Consumer and Corporate Affairs to the Ministry of Urban Affairs and Housing.

McIntosh was re-elected in the provincial election of 1995, defeating Liberal Allen Green by 1130 votes. On May 9, 1995, she was appointed Minister of Education and Training, responsible for K-12 education in public and independent schools and for post secondary education in universities, colleges and apprenticeship programs.

In the final cabinet shuffle of Filmon's government on February 5, 1999, McIntosh was named Minister of Environment with responsibility for the Manitoba Public Insurance Corporation Act.

McIntosh was very narrowly defeated by New Democrat Jim Rondeau in the 1999 provincial election. McIntosh actually led Rondeau on election night, but fell three votes behind when the institutional and absentee ballots were counted.

=== Author ===
Her biography of Steven Fletcher, Master of My Fate covers Fletcher's life from 2006 to 2015 and his work to legalize physician-assisted-death (PAD)in Canada. It includes stories and opinions from advocates and opponents of PAD and the text of the two Bills Fletcher introduced as an MP into the Canadian House of Commons on the topic. At the time of writing the Parliament of Canada had not acted upon the Canadian Supreme Court's order to develop PAD legislation. Hence the book became widely read, discussed and debated.
