= Donovan Swailes =

Canadian politician and musician (1892–1984)

Donovan Swailes (August 12, 1892 – December 10, 1984) was a Canadian politician and musician in Manitoba. He served in the Legislative Assembly of Manitoba as a member of the Cooperative Commonwealth Federation from 1945 to 1959.

Swailes was born and raised in Leeds, England, and worked in the textile industry. His father was a coal miner, who later worked in a woollen mill. His mother was active in the Salvation Army and the suffragette movement, and served time in prison for smashing windows in a London department store during a demonstration. The younger Swailes played the trombone for the Salvation Army and took courses from the University of Leeds. During World War I, he worked as a musician at the Opera House in Cork, Ireland, and later for the Australian Navy. After the war, he toured New Zealand with a professional band.

He moved to Canada in 1920, and became involved in the country's labour and social-democratic movements. He joined the Independent Labour Party in 1925, and later became the first president of the Manitoba Federation of Labour. In 1943, he represented Winnipeg and the Winnipeg Trades and Labour Council at the Convention of the American Federation of Labour. In the same year, he was elected secretary-treasurer of the Manitoba CCF. He served on the board of directors of the Winnipeg Musicians Union, the executive committee of Family Bureau, and the advisory board of the Manitoba Department of Education.

Originally a farmer after moving to Canada, Swailes later became a member of the Winnipeg Symphony Orchestra under the direction of Hugh Ross and Bernard Naylor. He became Secretary of the Musicians' Union in 1934.

He was first elected to the Manitoba legislature in the provincial election of 1945, for the Winnipeg constituency. At the time, Winnipeg elected ten members by a single transferable ballot. Swailes finished thirteenth on the first count, but was declared elected to the seventh position on the thirteenth count following transfers from other CCF candidates. Swailes was an important organizer for the CCF in this campaign, working with David Lewis and Lloyd Stinson.

Winnipeg's electoral map was redrawn for the 1949 provincial election. Swailes ran for re-election in the Winnipeg Centre constituency, which elected four members via a single transferable ballot. He finished in second place, and was declared elected on the first count. In the 1953 election, he was re-elected at the top of the poll.

Swailes ran for Mayor of Winnipeg in 1948 losing to Garnet Coulter. He ran again in 1952, but finished third against Coulter and Stephen Juba.

Winnipeg abandoned multi-member constituencies for the 1958 provincial election and Swailes was re-elected in the constituency of Assiniboia, defeated Progressive Conservative George William Johnson by 131 votes. Assiniboia was a marginal seat, and Swailes had little assistance from party headquarters in this campaign. He was defeated in the 1959 election, losing to Johnson by 217 votes.

Swailes was elected to the Winnipeg city council later in 1959, and served for over a decade. He attempted a comeback at the provincial level in the 1962 provincial election, running in Winnipeg Centre as a candidate of the New Democratic Party (which replaced the CCF in 1961). He finished a surprisingly poor third against Progressive Conservative James Cowan, but was re-elected in the third ward of Winnipeg's City Council in 1963.

Former CCF leader Lloyd Stinson once described Swailes as "the hardest worker on the opposition side". He was active in many issues, and often criticized the Douglas Campbell administration for its conservatism.

He died in Victoria, British Columbia at the age of 92.

Swailes's brother, Robert Swailes, was a parliamentarian in British Columbia.
