= Ric Nordman =

Canadian politician

Captain Ric Nordman, 1945.

Rurik (Ric) Nordman (October 18, 1919 in Cypress River, Manitoba – July 29, 1996 in Winnipeg, Manitoba) was a businessman and politician in Manitoba, Canada.

Nordman served on Winnipeg City Council, representing the St. Charles Ward from 1974 until 1981.

In the provincial election of 1981 Nordman defeated NDP candidate Max Melnyk by over 1,000 votes to be elected a member of the Legislative Assembly of Manitoba, representing the riding of Assiniboia for the Progressive Conservative Party. In the 1986 election, he faced Melnyk again and won by a greater margin. He was narrowly defeated by Liberal Ed Mandrake in the provincial election of 1988, ironically as the Progressive Conservatives won a minority government. He did not seek a return to politics before his death in 1996.

Nordman was generally respected by members on all sides of the house.

Nordman served in the Canadian Army from 1940 to 1945, reaching the rank of Captain.

Nordman worked as a restaurateur following the war, and eventually operated a number of successful businesses in Manitoba and California. Ric served two different terms as President of Kirkfield Park Community Club in the mid-1960s as well as being one of the founders of the St. James Canadians Jr. Hockey Club. He was also a founding member of Messiah Lutheran Church in Westwood, and a board member of the Rainbow Stage Theatre.

In 1992, Nordman was awarded the 125th Anniversary of the Confederation of Canada Medal by Premier Gary Filmon in recognition of his service to the community.

Ric Nordman died in Winnipeg at the age of 77 and was survived by his wife, Kathleen (Kae) Nordman, and their two sons Grant and Greg.

Ric's oldest son, Grant Nordman, was elected as the City Councillor for St. Charles Ward on October 25, 2006, 32 years after his father was first elected to that office. In 2011, his son Greg ran for city council in St. Vital Ward.

Preceded by Norma Price	Member of the Legislative Assembly for Assiniboia; 1981-1988	Succeeded by Ed Mandrake
