= Bruce Park =

Small suburban memorial park within greater Winnipeg

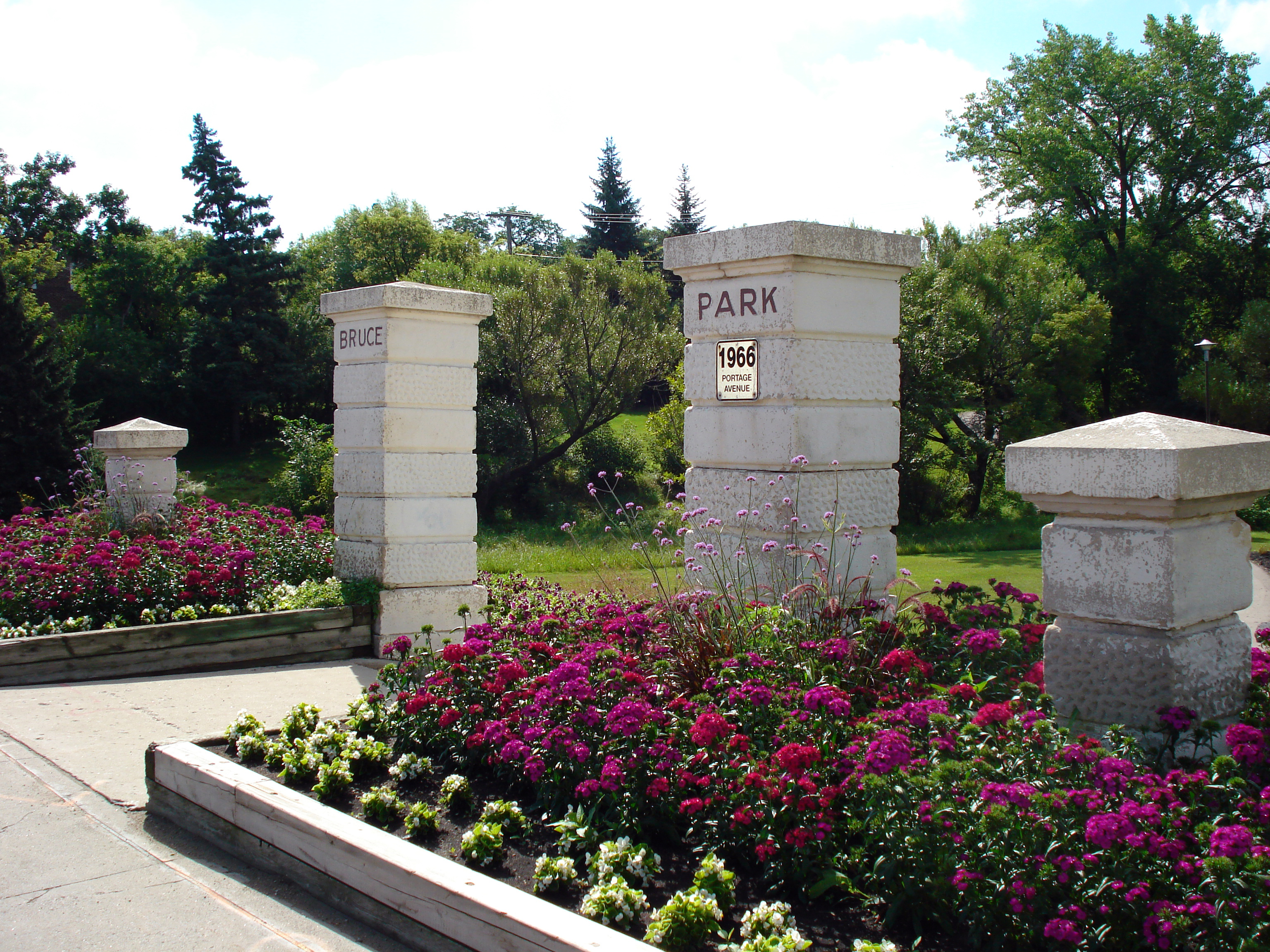
- Entrance to Bruce Park
- Interactive map of Bruce Park
- Location: 1966 Portage Ave. Winnipeg, Manitoba, Canada
- Coordinates: 49°52′36″N 97°13′33″W
- Area: 13 acres (5.3 ha)
- Etymology: named for Peter Bruce
- Public transit: Winnipeg Transit; 22

Bruce Park is a 13-acre (53,000 m^{2}) urban park located at 1966 Portage Avenue, in Winnipeg, Manitoba, Canada. The park is bordered to the south by the Assiniboine River, to the east by Douglas Park Road, to the west by Deer Lodge Place, and to the north by Portage Avenue.

The park has three footbridges that cross the Truro Creek, which runs through the park. Features of the park include formal flower gardens, grassland and forest naturalization areas, the A.W. Hanks Walkway, the Bruce Park Cenotaph war memorial, a playground, and a wading pool. The park is open year-round.

== History ==
Bruce Park is named after Peter Bruce. The Bruce family were Metis farmers that originally settled the land in the 1850s. The land where Peter Bruce lived was donated to the Municipality of St. James in 1933 under the condition that it always remains a green space for all to enjoy.

In mid-May 1936, four Boy Scout troops in the St. James area planted trees and a lilac bush within the park. West District Troops taking part in the Arbour Day project included seventh Anglican, 33rd Soongy Tay Ay, 40th Deer Lodge, and 72nd St. James United.

There is a plaque, near the Portage Avenue entrance, commemorating their contribution to the area.

In 1992, the "Friends of Bruce Park" were formed to help preserve and protect the park.

== Bruce Park Cenotaph ==
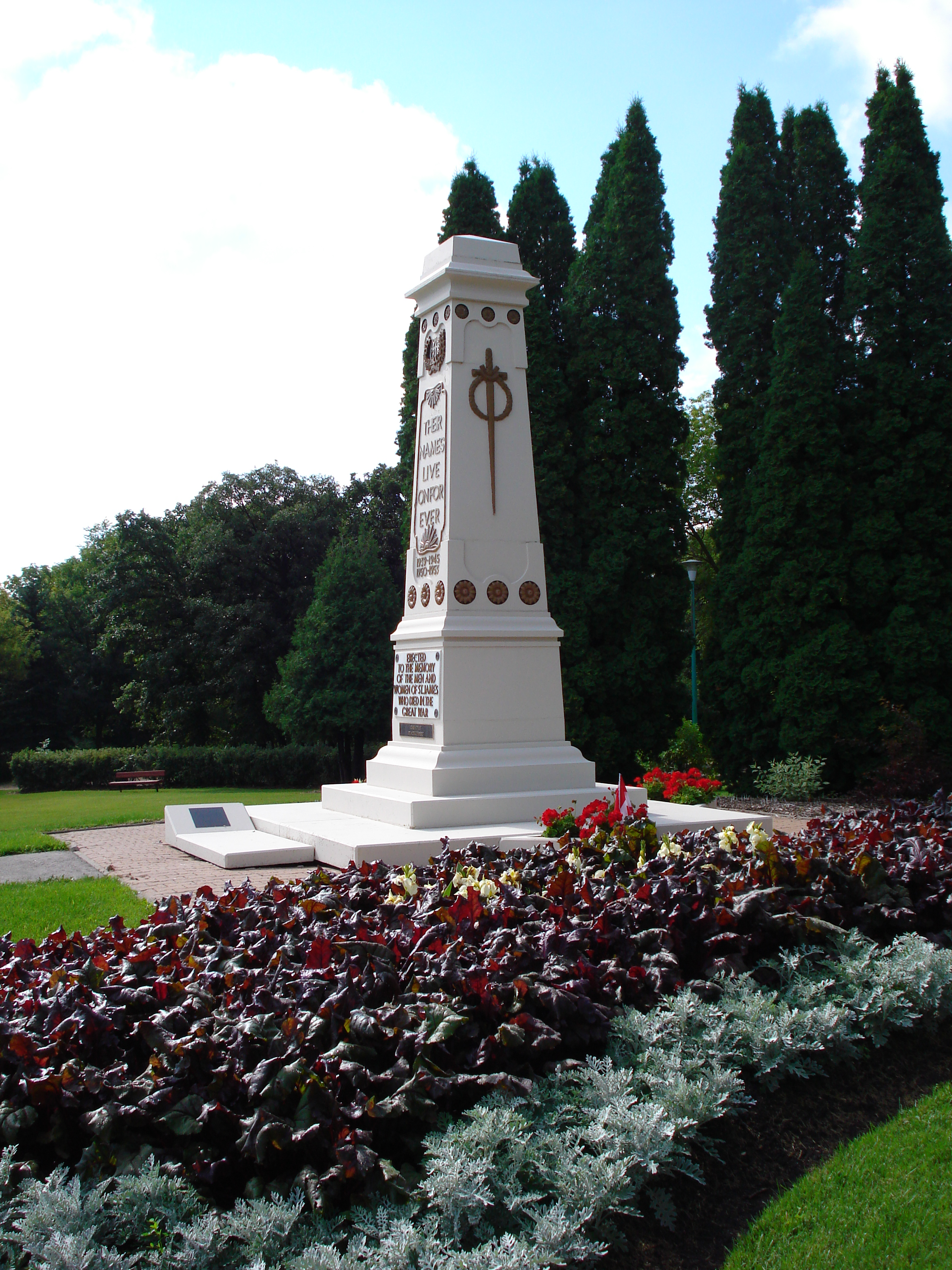
Bruce Park Cenotaph

The Bruce Park Cenotaph was erected in 1936 as a centrepiece in the park to honour the memory of the men and women of St. James who died in the Great War (World War I) and approved on May 9. The St. James memorial committee donated the monument to the city of St. James on June 30, 1936. Due to the exemplary workmanship, the monument stood for over half a century. Frost damage destroyed the cenotaph in the 1980s.

The current cenotaph was erected in 1990. It was dedicated at 2 pm September 30, 1990 to the memory of those who died in World War I, World War II, Korea, and to Canadian peacekeepers. The current monument is a true replica of the original cenotaph. The new cenotaph was built with $37,000 funding from St. James branch #4 Royal Canadian Legion in conjunction with the city of Winnipeg St. James-Assiniboia Parks and Recreation branch.
