= William Bayley =

Canadian politician

William Dowell Bayley (December 24, 1879 – November 5, 1955) was a politician in Manitoba, Canada. He served in the Legislative Assembly of Manitoba from 1920 to 1927.

== Early life and education ==
Bayley was born in Winnipeg, the son of William Dowell Bayley and Lucy Charlotte Carney, of English descent. Bayley received a Bachelor of Arts degree from the University of Manitoba, and was a medallist in philosophy and political economy. He served as principal of King George Public School in Norwood, and in 1918 lectured on prohibition for the "dry" side in New Zealand.

== Political career ==
He first ran for the Manitoba legislature in the provincial election of 1915, as a candidate of the Labour Representation Committee. He finished second in Assiniboia, coming in 55 votes behind Liberal candidate John Wilton.

Labour's electoral fortunes rose in Manitoba after the Winnipeg General Strike of 1919. Bayley ran for the legislature again in the 1920 provincial election as a candidate of the Dominion Labour Party, and defeated Wilton by 103 votes. The Liberals won a minority government in this election, and Bayley served as an opposition member of the legislature. He was re-elected in the 1922 election, which was won by the United Farmers of Manitoba.

Bayley was known as a strong orator, and had the honour of being the first public school teacher to serve in the Manitoba legislature. He left the Labour Party caucus on January 8, 1924, shortly after the retirement of party leader Fred Dixon. He served as an independent member of the legislature after this time, and did not seek re-election in 1927. He was appointed head of temperance education after retiring from the legislature, and opposed efforts to liberalize Manitoba's liquor laws.

=== Prosperity for Posterity Party ===
Bayley was a staunch prohibitionist, and opposed 1950s efforts to liberalize Manitoba's liquor laws. He was particularly opposed to the policies of Stephen Juba, who had called for a provincial referendum on the issue. Bayley attempted a political comeback in 1953, largely in response to Stephen Juba's increased popularity in the city. Juba, who would later be elected Winnipeg's mayor, promoted liquor law reforms as part of a populist platform. In response, Bayley formed the Prosperity for Posterity Party (PPP), a short-lived political party in Manitoba, Canada. It was established for the 1953 provincial election, but was dissolved before the election took place.

The PPP was primarily a vehicle for Bayley to voice his temperance policies. The party's manifesto stated that it would "approach all questions from the standpoint of the welfare of future generations". It issued a five-point platform:

1. Opposing any extension of Manitoba's liquor laws (especially the plan favoured by Juba)
2. Re-establishing temperance courses in Manitoba's public school system
3. Lowering the voting age to 18
4. Hastening the process of school consolidation
5. Making cabinet ministers responsible for morale in their departments

The PPP held its first and only nomination meeting in Winnipeg on April 29, 1953. After no other volunteers came forward, Bayley agreed to campaign for the party in Winnipeg South on condition that 100 supporters provide financial backing. He fell short of his target, but nonetheless entered the contest a short time thereafter. Bayley withdrew from the contest before election day, however, claiming that his candidacy could split the temperance vote. When he left the race, he suggested that his candidacy could split the temperance vote. He issued the following statement:

"I choose to withdraw, thanking the friends of temperance, and of me personally, both those who paid me to run and those who said don't, and apologizing to Winnipeg Centre electors for ever thinking they wouldn't adequately deal with Mr. Juba".

(Stephen Juba was elected in Winnipeg Centre in that election.)

== Death ==
Bayley died in Winnipeg at the age of 75 and was buried in Montreal, Quebec.
