= Gerry McAlpine =

Canadian politician

Member of the Legislative Assembly of Manitoba for Sturgeon Creek
- Preceded by: Iva Yeo
- Succeeded by: Riding Dissolved

Gerry McAlpine (born May 26, 1939) was a politician in Manitoba, Canada. He was a member of the Legislative Assembly of Manitoba from 1990 to 1999, representing the riding of Sturgeon Creek as a Progressive Conservative. He was the vice-chairperson of the standing committee on public utilities and natural resources.

The son of Donald McAlpine, he was born in Dubuc, Saskatchewan and was educated at the University of Manitoba. McAlpine worked as an insurance adjustor, as a claims manager for Merit Insurance and then operated his own company, McAlpine Investigations. He subsequently worked in real estate and as a nutritional food distributor.

McAlpine was first elected to the Manitoba legislature in the provincial election of 1990, defeating incumbent Liberal Iva Yeo by 769 votes in the riding of Sturgeon Creek. He was re-elected by a greater margin in the general election of 1995.

In the provincial election of 1999, McAlpine lost to NDP candidate Bonnie Korzeniowski by 638 votes in the redistributed riding of St. James. He did not contest the seat in 2003.
