= David Marr Walker =

Canadian politician

David Marr Walker (October 3, 1835 – 1920) was a lawyer, judge and political figure in Manitoba. He represented St. James in 1879 and Westbourne from 1880 to 1882 in the Legislative Assembly of Manitoba.

He was born in Woodhouse, Norfolk County, Upper Canada, the son of Solomon Walker and Sarah Osborne, and was educated in Norfolk County, at the University of Toronto and at Osgoode Hall. In 1856, he married Anna Bella Anderson. Walker was called to the Ontario bar in 1860 and practised in Simcoe County until 1870. In that year, he came to Winnipeg with the Wolseley Expedition. Walker resumed the practice of law there, serving as solicitor for the city of Winnipeg from 1874 to 1878. Walker served in the Manitoba cabinet as Attorney General. In 1882, he was named judge in the county court for the Western Judicial District; in 1893, he was transferred to Winnipeg. In 1911, he was also named police magistrate for Winnipeg.

Walker died in Venice, California.
