= Sturgeon Creek =

Defunct provincial electoral district in Manitoba, Canada

Sturgeon Creek is a former provincial electoral district of Manitoba, Canada. It was created by redistribution in 1969, and was abolished in 1999.

Sturgeon Creek was located in the northwestern area section of Winnipeg. It was bordered to the west by Kirkfield Park and Assiniboia, to the south by Tuxedo, to the east by Wellington and St. James, and to the north by the rural riding of Lakeside. When the riding was abolished, its territory was incorporated into the new St. James riding.

== Members of the Legislative Assembly ==
| Name | Party | Took office | Left office |
|---|---|---|---|
| Frank Johnston | PC | 1969 | 1988 |
| Iva Yeo | Lib | 1988 | 1990 |
| Gerry McAlpine | PC | 1990 | 1999 |

== Election results ==
1986 Manitoba general election
| Party | Candidate | Votes | % | ±% |
|---|---|---|---|---|
| Progressive Conservative | Frank Johnston | 4,994 | 55.17 | -3.02 |
| New Democratic | Leslie Campbell | 2,402 | 26.54 | -7.59 |
| Liberal | Robert Inman | 1,530 | 16.90 | +9.22 |
| Independent | S. Dalgliesh | 126 | 1.39 | n/a |
| Turnout | | 9,073 | 67.45 | -5.62 |
| Progressive Conservative hold | | Swing | | +2.28 |
Source: Elections Manitoba

1988 Manitoba general election
| Party | Candidate | Votes | % | ±% |
|---|---|---|---|---|
| Liberal | Iva Yeo | 4,833 | 47.45 | +30.55 |
| Progressive Conservative | Frank Johnston | 4,174 | 40.98 | -14.19 |
| New Democratic | Len Sawatsky | 993 | 9.75 | -16.79 |
| Confederation of Regions | Hugh Buskell | 158 | 1.55 | n/a |
| Communist | Nigel Hanrahan | 27 | 0.27 | n/a |
| Total valid votes | | 10,185 | 100.00 | |
| Rejected ballots | | 19 | | |
| Turnout | | 10,204 | 76.73 | |
| Eligible voters | | 13,298 | | |
| Liberal gain from Progressive Conservative | | Swing | | +22.37 |
Source: Elections Manitoba

1990 Manitoba general election
| Party | Candidate | Votes | % | ±% |
|---|---|---|---|---|
| Progressive Conservative | Gerry McAlpine | 4,676 | 46.51 | +5.53 |
| Liberal | Iva Yeo | 3,907 | 38.86 | -8.59 |
| New Democratic | Andrew Swan | 1,471 | 14.63 | +4.88 |
| Turnout | | 10,093 | 74.22 | -2.51 |
| Progressive Conservative gain from Liberal | | Swing | | +7.06 |
Source: Elections Manitoba

== See also ==
- List of Manitoba provincial electoral districts
- Canadian provincial electoral districts
