= Deanne Crothers =

Canadian politician

Manitoba Minister of Healthy Living and Seniors
- In office November 3, 2014 – May 3, 2016
- Premier: Greg Selinger
- Preceded by: Sharon Blady
- Succeeded by: Portfolio abolished

Member of the Legislative Assembly of Manitoba for St. James
- In office October 4, 2011 – April 19, 2016
- Preceded by: Bonnie Korzeniowski
- Succeeded by: Scott Johnston

Personal details
- Party: New Democrat

Deanne Crothers is a Canadian politician, who was elected to the Legislative Assembly of Manitoba in the 2011 election. She represented the electoral district of St. James as a member of the Manitoba New Democratic Party caucus. On November 8, 2013 she was announced as the Special Envoy for Military Affairs. On November 3, 2014 she was named Minister of Healthy Living and Seniors.

Crothers contested the 2016 election for St. James but was defeated by her Progressive Conservative opponent.

== Electoral record ==
2016 Manitoba general election: St. James
Party	Candidate	Votes	%	±%	Expenditures
Progressive Conservative	Scott Johnston	3,532	42.09	+3.76	$32,538.01
New Democratic	Deanne Crothers	2,723	32.45	-17.31	$38,621.27
Liberal	Michelle Finley	1,150	13.70	+6.01	$12,111.25
Green	Jeff Buhse	850	10.13	+5.90	$676.87
Manitoba	Bradley Gross	137	1.63	–	$0.00
Total valid votes		8,392	98.97		
Total rejected ballots		87	1.03	+0.75	
Turnout		8,479	61.94	-0.08	
Eligible voters		13,689			
Progressive Conservative gain from New Democratic		Swing		+10.53	
Source: Elections Manitoba

2011 Manitoba general election: St. James
Party	Candidate	Votes	%	±%	Expenditures
New Democratic	Deanne Crothers	4,432	49.61	−6.04	$25,563.25
Progressive Conservative	Scott Gillingham	3,414	38.21	+7.38	$31,468.19
Liberal	Gerard Allard	685	7.67	−0.96	$5,903.97
Green	Trevor Vandale	377	4.22	–	$205.40
Total valid votes		8,908			
Rejected and declined ballots		25			
Turnout		8,933	62.02	+2.82	
Electors on the lists		14,403			
