= Alexander Murray (Manitoba politician) =

Canadian politician

Member of the Legislative Assembly of Manitoba for St. Charles
- In office December 23, 1874 – 1878

Member of the Legislative Assembly of Manitoba for Assiniboia
- In office 1879–1888
- Succeeded by: Duncan MacArthur

6th Speaker of the Legislative Assembly of Manitoba
- In office April 17, 1883 – December 1886
- Preceded by: Gilbert McMicken
- Succeeded by: David Glass

Personal details
- Born: 18 April 1839 Kildonan, Rupert's Land
- Died: 12 May 1913 (aged 74) St. Charles, Manitoba
- Party: Liberal-Conservative

Alexander Murray (18 April 1839 – 12 May 1913) was a Canadian politician in the province of Manitoba

Born in Kildonan, Manitoba, to James and Elizabeth (Holmes) Murray, Murray was educated at St. John's College, University of Manitoba. In 1861, he married Letitia, the daughter of the Orkney/Cree missionary George Flett. He was first elected to the Legislative Assembly of Manitoba as the Liberal-Conservative candidate in the 1874 general election. He was acclaimed in the 1878 general election. He resigned to serve as Police Magistrate in East Marquette. He was re-elected in 1879 for the electoral district of Assiniboia. He was re-elected in 1883 and 1886. He resigned in 1888. From April 17, 1883, to December 1886, he was the Speaker of the Legislative Assembly of Manitoba. In 1887, he was appointed Minister of Municipal Affairs. From 1887 to 1888, he was the Municipal Commissioner.
