= John W. Wilton =

Canadian politician

Captain John W. Wilton (January 27, 1879 – December 10, 1942) was a lawyer, soldier and politician in Manitoba, Canada.

== Early life and law career ==
He was born in High Bluff, Manitoba, the son of Henry Wilton and Jean Barron, and was educated in Morden and at Manitoba University. Wilton taught school for five years before coming to Winnipeg in 1901. He studied law, was called to the Manitoba bar in 1906 and practised law in Winnipeg. In 1905, Wilton married Lily L. Hobkirk. He was also president of the National Loan & Investment Corporation and vice-president of the Central Canada Investment Corporation.

His sister Winifred Wilton Wilson was the first woman called to the Manitoba bar and one of the first two women to practice law in the province.

== Political career ==
Wilton served in the Legislative Assembly of Manitoba from 1915 to 1920, as a member of the Liberal Party.

He first ran for the Manitoba legislature in the 1914 provincial election, and finished second against Conservative John Thomas Haig in the Winnipeg-area constituency of Assiniboia.

He ran again in the 1915 campaign, and defeated Labour candidate William Bayley by fifty-five votes (Haig finished third). The Liberals won a landslide victory in this election, and Wilton served as a backbench supporter of Tobias Norris's government for the next five years.

Wilton introduced the Workers Compensation Act and the Soldiers' Taxation Relief Act into the legislature.

He appears to have left the Liberal Party just before the 1920 provincial election: campaigning for re-election as an independent, he lost to William Bayley by 103 seats.

== Military career ==
In 1916, Wilton joined the Canadian forces as a private. He served overseas and later reached the rank of captain.

== Later life ==
Wilton died in Winnipeg at the age of 63 after suffering a heart attack.
