= Brooklands, Winnipeg =

Former town in Manitoba, Canada

Brooklands
- Former town
- Interactive map of Brooklands
- Coordinates: 49.920°N 97.201°W
- Country: Canada
- Province: Manitoba
- City: Winnipeg
- Incorporated (village): 1921
- Incorporated (town): 1961
- Amalgamated: 1967
- Area codes: 204 and 431

Brooklands is a former urban municipality in Manitoba, Canada that now resides within the City of Winnipeg. It held village status from 1921 to 1961 and then town status from 1961 to 1967 when it amalgamated with the City of St. James, which in turn amalgamated with Rural Municipality of Assiniboia in 1968 and then again with Winnipeg in 1972.

== History ==
Federal census population history of Brooklands
Year	Pop.	±%
1926	2,489	—
1931	2,628	+5.6%
1936	2,246	−14.5%
1941	2,240	−0.3%
1946	2,728	+21.8%
1951	2,915	+6.9%
1956	3,941	+35.2%
1961	4,369	+10.9%
1966	4,181	−4.3%
Source: Statistics Canada

Brooklands was founded as an unincorporated community in the Rural Municipality of Rosser in the early 1900s. After growth from approximately 250 to 800 people, the community unsuccessfully sought incorporation or amalgamation with Winnipeg in 1909 as a means to acquire municipal water and sewer services. A second attempt occurred in 1921, which resulted in incorporation as a village. Forty years later, Brooklands was incorporated as a town in 1961. The Town of Brooklands then amalgamated with the City of St. James in 1967. The City of St. James further amalgamated with the Rural Municipality of Assiniboia two years later in 1969 to form the City of St. James-Assiniboia. Three years later, St. James-Assiniboia and numerous other nearby municipalities finally amalgamated with the City of Winnipeg on January 1, 1972.

== Government ==
The first mayor of the Village of Brooklands was George Raymond Alexander Brown. The village went bankrupt in 1932 so it was led by a provincially appointed village manager, John Reeves, until 1944. The final mayor of the Town of Brooklands, prior to amalgamation with the City of St. James, was Walter Bannister.

List of mayors of Brooklands
Term	Mayor
1922–1923	George Raymond Alexander Brown
1924–1925	John Haddow
1926–1930	John McLean
1931	William Leask
1931–1944	No mayor due to bankruptcy Instead led by John Reeves (manager)
1944–1950	Crispin Oddy
1951	Nicholas Solilak
1952–1953	Stanley V. Bowers
1954–1955	Daniel Harry Juba
1956–1957	Walter Bannister
1958–1959	Harry Stiller
1960–1966	Walter Bannister

== See also ==
- Unicity - the amalgamation that created the current City of Winnipeg
- Other former municipalities now in the City of Winnipeg:

- Charleswood, Winnipeg
- East Kildonan
- Fort Garry, Winnipeg
- North Kildonan
- Old Kildonan
- St. Boniface, Winnipeg
- St. Vital
- Transcona
- Tuxedo, Winnipeg
- West Kildonan
