= Sturgeon Creek (Washington) =

Stream in Washington, U.S.

Coordinates: 48°03′15″N 122°11′44″W

Sturgeon Creek is a stream in the U.S. state of Washington.

Sturgeon Creek's name is an accurate preservation of its Indian name.

== See also ==
- List of rivers of Washington (state)
