= Duncan MacArthur (Manitoba politician) =

Canadian politician (1840–1907)

Duncan MacArthur (May 29, 1840 – January 20, 1907) was a Scottish-born businessman, author and political figure in Manitoba. He represented Assiniboia in 1888 in the Legislative Assembly of Manitoba as a Conservative.

He was born in Nairnshire, the son of John Macarthur and Sarah Dallas, and was educated at the Free Church Academy there. In 1864, he was hired by the Hudson's Bay Company and joined his brother Alexander in Montreal. In 1868, MacArthur succeeded his brother as senior clerk. He became manager of the Merchants' Bank of Canada in Winnipeg in 1871. In 1888, MacArthur helped form the North-West Fire Insurance Company and served as its first president. In the same year, he also became managing director of the Nelson Valley Railway, later part of the Winnipeg and Hudson's Bay Railway and Steamship Company. He then served as president of the Portage, Westbourne and North Western Railway, later known as the Manitoba and North Western Railway Company of Canada, in 1882 and of the Manitoba Central Railway, established in 1883. He was also associated with a private bank, MacArthur, Boyle, and Campbell. In 1885, he became president of the Commercial Bank of Manitoba.

He was elected to the Manitoba assembly in a by-election held in January 1888. In the 1888 general election, MacArthur lost to John Norquay in the riding of Kildonan by two votes.

MacArthur was married three times: first to Catherine Robertson in 1873, then to Christian Ross in 1876 and finally to Elizabeth, the daughter of James Charles McKeagney in 1886.

He was the author of The Scottish Highlander: his origin, literature, language and general characteristics, published in 1893. He also published two manuscript histories of the fur trade which are stored in the Manitoba provincial archives.

Following the collapse of the Commercial Bank of Manitoba in 1893, MacArthur moved to Chicago in 1898. He later settled in Reaburn, Manitoba but died in Chicago while on business in 1907 and was buried in Winnipeg.
