= David Best (politician) =

Canadian politician (1880-1949)

David Alexander Best (November 21, 1880 in Derry, Ireland – February 1, 1949) was a politician in Manitoba, Canada. He served in the Legislative Assembly of Manitoba from 1941 to 1945 as an anti-coalition Conservative.

== Early life ==
Best was born in Derry, to David Best and Martha Peden, He was educated at Foyle College and worked for the British civil service and then moved to Canada in 1911. He worked as an accountant and printing salesman before being elected as the reeve of St. James, Manitoba in 1938. In 1907, he married Rachel Watterson.

== Career ==
Best was elected to the Manitoba legislature in the provincial election of 1941. Prior to this election, the Conservative Party of Manitoba entered a coalition government led by the Liberal Progressive Party and also including the Cooperative Commonwealth Federation and Social Credit. A number of Conservatives opposed joining the coalition, and ran for the legislature against their party's position.

Best was one of three anti-coalition Conservatives elected to the legislature in 1941. He defeated CCF incumbent James Aiken in Assiniboia by 274 votes, and served as an opposition member for the parliament that followed.

In 1943, the Conservative Party changed its name to the Progressive Conservative Party. Best ran in the 1945 provincial election as an official Progressive Conservative candidate, but lost to CCF candidate Ernest Draffin by 170 votes.

He died at home in Winnipeg at the age of 68.
