= St. James (provincial electoral district) =

Provincial electoral district in Manitoba, Canada

Coordinates: 49.899°N 97.209°W

Manitoba electoral district
- Location in Winnipeg

Provincial electoral district
- Legislature: Legislative Assembly of Manitoba
MLA
Adrien Sala
New Democratic
- District created: 1957
- First contested: 1958
- Last contested: 2023

Demographics
- Census subdivision(s): Winnipeg

St. James is a provincial electoral district of Manitoba, Canada.

== Historical riding ==
The original St. James riding was established at the province's creation in 1870, and lasted until the election of 1879. It was located in what was then a separate community on Winnipeg's periphery.

=== Historical members of the Legislative Assembly ===
Name	Party	Took office	Left office
Edwin Bourke	Canadian Party/Opposition	1870	1874
	Independent	1874	1878
David Walker	Government/Conservative	1878	1879

== Modern riding ==
The modern St. James riding was created by redistribution in 1957 out of part of Assiniboia, and has formally existed since the provincial election of 1958. The riding is located in the western section of Winnipeg.

St. James is bordered on the east by Wellington, Minto and Wolseley, to the south by Tuxedo, to the north by Wellington and Lakeside, and to the west by Assiniboia and Kirkfield Park.

The riding's population in 1996 was 20,417. In 1999, the average family income was $47,842, and the unemployment rate was 6.20%. Almost 19% of St. James's population is over 65 years of age, and almost 38% of dwelling units are rented.

The service sector accounts for 15% of St. James's industry, following by government services (14%) and manufacturing (13%).

St. James was a marginal Progressive Conservative/NDP riding for most of its history to 1988. It was won in that year by Liberal Paul Edwards, who was elected leader of his party in 1993. The NDP recaptured the seat in 1995.

== Recent boundary changes ==
The St. James riding underwent a dramatic redistribution in 1999. Previously, the space the riding occupied roughly the same space as the riding of Minto, which was newly created that year and, as of 2019, exists as Notre Dame. In fact, the original plan of the Manitoba Electoral Boundaries Commission in 1999 was to rename St. James as Minto, and create a new riding called King Edward to its immediate west (primarily from the old riding of Sturgeon Creek). Instead, the boundaries legislation passed by the Manitoba legislature in 1999 determined that the new riding would be called St. James.

Although the current riding has some territory in common with its predecessor of the same name, it is probably more accurately regarded as the successor riding to Sturgeon Creek. The NDP captured this seat from the Tories in 1999, and retained it in 2003.

== Members of the Legislative Assembly ==
Name	Party	Took office	Left office
Douglas Stanes	PC	1958	1969
Alvin Mackling	NDP	1969	1973
George Minaker	PC	1973	1981
Alvin Mackling	NDP	1981	1988
Paul Edwards	Lib	1988	1995
MaryAnn Mihychuk	NDP	1995	1999
Bonnie Korzeniowski	NDP	1999	2011
Deanne Crothers	NDP	2011	2016
Scott Johnston	PC	2016	2019
Adrien Sala	NDP	2019	

== Electoral results ==
=== 1870 ===
1870 Manitoba general election
Party	Candidate	Votes	%
Opposition	Edwin Bourke	35	62.50%
Government	Frederick Edward Molyneux St. John	21	37.50%
Total valid votes		56	–
Rejected		N/A	–
Eligible voters / Turnout		N/A	–
Source(s) Source: Manitoba. Chief Electoral Officer (1999). Statement of Votes for the 37th Provincial General Election, September 21, 1999 (PDF) (Report). Winnipeg: Elections Manitoba.

=== 1874 ===
1874 Manitoba general election
Party	Candidate	Votes	%	±%
Government	Edwin Bourke	44	49.44%	11.94%
Undeclared	Frederick Edward Molyneux St. John	42	47.19%	–
Undeclared	Robert Tait	3	3.37%	–
Total valid votes		89	–	–
Rejected		N/A	–	
Eligible voters / Turnout		119	74.79%	–
Source(s) Source: Manitoba. Chief Electoral Officer (1999). Statement of Votes for the 37th Provincial General Election, September 21, 2000 (PDF) (Report). Winnipeg: Elections Manitoba.

=== 1878 ===
1878 Manitoba general election
Party	Candidate	Votes	%	±%
Undeclared	David Marr Walker	71	76.34%	25.78%
Undeclared	W. J. Corrigan	22	23.66%	-26.91%
Total valid votes		93	–	–
Rejected		N/A	–	
Eligible voters / Turnout		167	55.69%	-19.10%
Source(s) Source: Manitoba. Chief Electoral Officer (1999). Statement of Votes for the 37th Provincial General Election, September 21, 2004 (PDF) (Report). Winnipeg: Elections Manitoba.

=== 1958 ===
1958 Manitoba general election
Party	Candidate	Votes	%	±%
Progressive Conservative	Douglas Stanes	2,646	38.06%	–
Liberal–Progressive	Reginald Wightman	2,170	31.21%	–
Co-operative Commonwealth	Al Mackling	2,136	30.72%	–
Total valid votes		6,952	–	–
Rejected		38	–	
Eligible voters / Turnout		11,148	62.36%	–
Source(s) Source: Manitoba. Chief Electoral Officer (1999). Statement of Votes for the 37th Provincial General Election, September 21, 2066 (PDF) (Report). Winnipeg: Elections Manitoba.

=== 1959 ===
1959 Manitoba general election
Party	Candidate	Votes	%	±%
Progressive Conservative	Douglas Stanes	3,616	47.99%	9.93%
Co-operative Commonwealth	Al Mackling	2,378	31.56%	0.83%
Liberal–Progressive	David Graham	1,541	20.45%	-10.76%
Total valid votes		7,535	–	–
Rejected		66	–	
Eligible voters / Turnout		11,093	67.93%	5.56%
Source(s) Source: Manitoba. Chief Electoral Officer (1999). Statement of Votes for the 37th Provincial General Election, September 21, 2067 (PDF) (Report). Winnipeg: Elections Manitoba.

=== 1962 ===
1962 Manitoba general election
Party	Candidate	Votes	%	±%
Progressive Conservative	Douglas Stanes	2,707	44.03%	-3.96%
Liberal	Dave Johnston	2,202	35.82%	–
New Democratic	William J. Hardy	1,239	20.15%	–
Total valid votes		6,148	–	–
Rejected		45	–	
Eligible voters / Turnout		10,614	57.92%	-10.00%
Source(s) Source: Manitoba. Chief Electoral Officer (1999). Statement of Votes for the 37th Provincial General Election, September 21, 2069 (PDF) (Report). Winnipeg: Elections Manitoba.

=== 1966 ===
1966 Manitoba general election
Party	Candidate	Votes	%	±%
Progressive Conservative	Douglas Stanes	3,034	44.78%	0.75%
Liberal	Lloyd Axworthy	2,244	33.12%	-2.69%
New Democratic	Jim Rose	1,497	22.10%	1.94%
Total valid votes		6,775	–	–
Rejected		52	–	
Eligible voters / Turnout		10,330	65.59%	7.66%
Source(s) Source: Manitoba. Chief Electoral Officer (1999). Statement of Votes for the 37th Provincial General Election, September 21, 2071 (PDF) (Report). Winnipeg: Elections Manitoba.

=== 1969 ===
1969 Manitoba general election
Party	Candidate	Votes	%	±%
New Democratic	Al Mackling	3,642	47.16%	25.07%
Progressive Conservative	Douglas Stanes	2,676	34.65%	-10.13%
Liberal	Peter Moss	1,404	18.18%	-14.94%
Total valid votes		7,722	–	–
Rejected		40	–	
Eligible voters / Turnout		11,176	69.09%	3.51%
Source(s) Source: Manitoba. Chief Electoral Officer (1999). Statement of Votes for the 37th Provincial General Election, September 21, 2072 (PDF) (Report). Winnipeg: Elections Manitoba.

=== 1973 ===
1973 Manitoba general election
Party	Candidate	Votes	%	±%
Progressive Conservative	George Minaker	4,483	45.00%	10.35%
New Democratic	Al Mackling	4,109	41.25%	-5.92%
Liberal	Michael Scholl	1,340	13.45%	-4.73%
Independent	George Zucawich	30	0.30%	–
Total valid votes		9,962	–	–
Rejected		49	–	
Eligible voters / Turnout		11,983	83.13%	14.04%
Source(s) Source: Manitoba. Chief Electoral Officer (1999). Statement of Votes for the 37th Provincial General Election, September 21, 2075 (PDF) (Report). Winnipeg: Elections Manitoba.

=== 1977 ===
1977 Manitoba general election
Party	Candidate	Votes	%	±%
Progressive Conservative	George Minaker	5,199	59.07%	14.07%
New Democratic	Curtis Nordman	2,853	32.42%	-8.83%
Liberal	John Wilson	749	8.51%	-4.94%
Total valid votes		8,801	–	–
Rejected		20	–	
Eligible voters / Turnout		11,327	77.70%	-5.44%
Source(s) Source: Manitoba. Chief Electoral Officer (1999). Statement of Votes for the 37th Provincial General Election, September 21, 2079 (PDF) (Report). Winnipeg: Elections Manitoba.

=== 1981 ===
1981 Manitoba general election
Party	Candidate	Votes	%	±%
New Democratic	Al Mackling	5,376	52.95%	20.53%
Progressive Conservative	George Minaker	4,597	45.28%	-13.80%
Progressive	Harvey Norbas	180	1.77%	–
Total valid votes		10,153	–	–
Rejected		41	–	
Eligible voters / Turnout		13,159	77.16%	-0.54%
Source(s) Source: Manitoba. Chief Electoral Officer (1999). Statement of Votes for the 37th Provincial General Election, September 21, 2081 (PDF) (Report). Winnipeg: Elections Manitoba.

=== 1986 ===
1986 Manitoba general election
Party	Candidate	Votes	%	±%
New Democratic	Al Mackling	4,120	44.22%	-8.73%
Progressive Conservative	Eldon Ross	3,965	42.55%	-2.73%
Liberal	Tom Thompson	922	9.89%	–
Confederation of Regions	Fred Debrecen	175	1.88%	–
Progressive	Charles Lamont	89	0.96%	-0.82%
Western Canada Concept	Merle R. Hartlin	47	0.50%	–
Total valid votes		9,318	–	–
Rejected		27	–	
Eligible voters / Turnout		12,892	72.28%	-4.88%
Source(s) Source: Manitoba. Chief Electoral Officer (1999). Statement of Votes for the 37th Provincial General Election, September 21, 2084 (PDF) (Report). Winnipeg: Elections Manitoba.

=== 1988 ===
1988 Manitoba general election
Party	Candidate	Votes	%	±%
Liberal	Paul Edwards	3,939	40.14%	30.25%
Progressive Conservative	Jae Eadie	3,360	34.24%	-8.31%
New Democratic	Allan MacDonald	2,171	22.13%	-22.09%
Confederation of Regions	Fred Debrecen	137	1.40%	-0.48%
Progressive	Charles Lamont	74	0.75%	-0.20%
Libertarian	Dennis Rice	69	0.70%	–
Western Independence	Merle Hartlin	62	0.63%	–
Total valid votes		9,812	–	–
Rejected		29	–	
Eligible voters / Turnout		12,530	78.31%	6.03%
Source(s) Source: Manitoba. Chief Electoral Officer (1999). Statement of Votes for the 37th Provincial General Election, September 21, 2085 (PDF) (Report). Winnipeg: Elections Manitoba.

=== 1990 ===
1990 Manitoba general election
Party	Candidate	Votes	%	±%
Liberal	Paul Edwards	3,014	35.09%	-5.05%
Progressive Conservative	Joanne Thibault	2,719	31.66%	-2.59%
New Democratic	Len Sawatsky	2,586	30.11%	7.98%
Progressive	Charles Lamont	148	1.72%	0.97%
Confederation of Regions	Fred Debrecen	122	1.42%	0.02%
Total valid votes		8,589	–	–
Rejected		22	–	
Eligible voters / Turnout		11,737	73.18%	-5.13%
Source(s) Source: Manitoba. Chief Electoral Officer (1999). Statement of Votes for the 37th Provincial General Election, September 21, 2086 (PDF) (Report). Winnipeg: Elections Manitoba.

=== 1995 ===
1995 Manitoba general election
Party	Candidate	Votes	%	±%
New Democratic	MaryAnn Mihychuk	3,019	35.63%	5.52%
Liberal	Paul Edwards	2,853	33.67%	-1.42%
Progressive Conservative	Clifford Allbutt	2,601	30.70%	-0.96%
Total valid votes		8,473	–	–
Rejected		48	–	
Eligible voters / Turnout		11,895	71.23%	-1.95%
Source(s) Source: Manitoba. Chief Electoral Officer (1999). Statement of Votes for the 37th Provincial General Election, September 21, 2089 (PDF) (Report). Winnipeg: Elections Manitoba.

=== 1999 ===
1999 Manitoba general election
Party	Candidate	Votes	%	±%	Expenditures
New Democratic	Bonnie Korzeniowski	4,483	44.76	+14.06	$27,649.00
Progressive Conservative	Gerry McAlpine	3,845	38.39	+2.76	$28,652.89
Liberal	Wayne Helgason	1,625	16.23	-17.44	$29,766.43
Total valid votes		9,953	100.00		
Rejected and declined ballots		62			
Turnout		10,015	72.01		
Electors on the lists		13,098			

=== 2003 ===
2003 Manitoba general election
Party	Candidate	Votes	%	±%	Expenditures
New Democratic	Bonnie Korzeniowski	3,982	53.68%	8.64%	$21,389.61
Progressive Conservative	Cliff Allbutt	2,473	33.34%	-5.29%	$15,753.00
Liberal	Alana McKenzie	963	12.98%	-3.34%	$33,210.99
Total valid votes		7,418	–	–	
Rejected		28	–		
Eligible voters / Turnout		13,441	55.19%	-16.40%	
Source(s) Source: Manitoba. Chief Electoral Officer (2003). Statement of Votes for the 38th Provincial General Election, June 3, 2003 (PDF) (Report). Winnipeg: Elections Manitoba. "Election Returns: 38th General Election". Elections Manitoba. 2011.

=== 2007 ===
2007 Manitoba general election
Party	Candidate	Votes	%	±%	Expenditures
New Democratic	Bonnie Korzeniowski	4,231	55.65	+1.97	$16,378.94
Progressive Conservative	Kristine McGhee	2,344	30.83	-2.51	$27,110.14
Liberal	Fred Morris	656	8.63	-4.35	$1,535.39
Green	Mike Johannson	339	4.47	–	$0.00
Total valid votes		7,572	99.59		
Rejected and declined ballots		31			
Turnout		7,603	59.20		
Electors on the lists		12,842			

=== 2011 ===
2011 Manitoba general election
Party	Candidate	Votes	%	±%	Expenditures
New Democratic	Deanne Crothers	4,432	49.61	−6.04	$25,563.25
Progressive Conservative	Scott Gillingham	3,414	38.21	+7.38	$31,468.19
Liberal	Gerard Allard	685	7.67	−0.96	$5,903.97
Green	Trevor Vandale	377	4.22	–	$205.40
Total valid votes		8,908			
Rejected and declined ballots		25			
Turnout		8,933	62.02	+2.82	
Electors on the lists		14,403			

=== 2016 ===
2016 Manitoba general election
Party	Candidate	Votes	%	±%	Expenditures
Progressive Conservative	Scott Johnston	3,532	42.09	+3.76	$32,538.01
New Democratic	Deanne Crothers	2,723	32.45	-17.31	$38,621.27
Liberal	Michelle Finley	1,150	13.70	+6.01	$12,111.25
Green	Jeff Buhse	850	10.13	+5.90	$676.87
Manitoba	Bradley Gross	137	1.63	–	$0.00
Total valid votes		8,392	98.97		
Total rejected ballots		87	1.03	+0.75	
Turnout		8,479	61.94	-0.08	
Eligible voters		13,689			
Progressive Conservative gain from New Democratic		Swing		+10.53	
Source: Elections Manitoba

=== 2019 ===
2016 provincial election redistributed results
Party	%
Progressive Conservative	38.5
New Democratic	34.6
Liberal	13.8
Green	10.0
Others	3.2

2019 Manitoba general election
Party	Candidate	Votes	%	±%	Expenditures
New Democratic	Adrien Sala	4,002	47.25	+12.3	$20,052.47
Progressive Conservative	Michelle Richards	2,781	32.84	-6.1	$45,848.85
Liberal	Bernd Hohne	880	10.39	-2.5	$3,102.61
Green	Jeff Buhse	806	9.52	-0.6	$939.40
Total valid votes		8,469	–	–	
Rejected		41	–		
Eligible voters / turnout		15,288	55.40%	-5.91%	
New Democratic gain from Progressive Conservative		Swing		+9.2	
Source(s) Source: Manitoba. Chief Electoral Officer (2019). Statement of Votes for the 42nd Provincial General Election, September 10, 2019 (PDF) (Report). Winnipeg: Elections Manitoba.

=== 2023 ===
2023 Manitoba general election
Party	Candidate	Votes	%	±%	Expenditures
New Democratic	Adrien Sala	5,448	64.82	+17.56	$25,571.43
Progressive Conservative	Tim Diack	2,326	27.67	-5.16	$17,274.06
Liberal	Randell Cacayuran	631	7.51	-2.88	$0.00
Total valid votes/expense limit		8,405	99.55	–	$60,907.00
Total rejected, unmarked and declined ballots		38	0.45	–	
Turnout		8,443	54.68	-0.99	
Eligible voters		15,442			
New Democratic hold		Swing		+11.36	
Source(s) Source: Elections Manitoba

== Previous boundaries ==
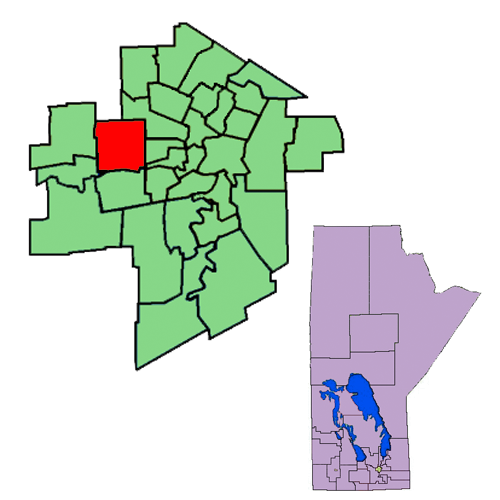
The 1999–2011 boundaries for St. James highlighted in red.

== See also ==
- List of Manitoba provincial electoral districts
- Canadian provincial electoral districts
