= Al Mackling =

Canadian politician (born 1927)

Member of the Legislative Assembly of Manitoba for St. James
- In office November 17, 1981 – April 26, 1988
- Preceded by: George Minaker
- Succeeded by: Paul Edwards
- In office June 25, 1969 – June 28, 1973
- Preceded by: Douglas Stanes
- Succeeded by: George Minaker

Personal details
- Born: December 31, 1927 (age 98) St. James, Manitoba, Canada
- Party: New Democratic Party
- Spouse: Patricia Mackling
- Education: United College
- Occupation: Politician

Alvin "Al" Mackling (born December 31, 1927) is a longtime Canadian Democratic Socialist and a retired lawyer. He was an alderman in the former city of St. James from 1961 to 1969 and was a member of the Legislative Assembly of Manitoba from 1969 to 1973 and from 1981 to 1988. He was a cabinet minister in the New Democratic Party governments of Edward Schreyer and Howard Pawley.

== Biography ==
=== Early life ===
The son of John Mackling, he was born in 1927 and educated in St. James. In 1944 he left high school and was employed with Saskatchewan Pool Elevators for five years. In the early 1940s he was smitten by the social gospel of J. S. Woodsworth and Stanley Knowles. He became an active member of the Co-operative Commonwealth Young People's Movement, becoming its President. In 1949 he went back to school graduating from United College (now the University of Winnipeg) in 1953. He worked for the Canadian Pacific Railway as a yardman for a year, then entered the Manitoba Law School in 1954, graduating in 1958. During his university years he was actively involved in University Mock Parliament as a member of the Co-operative Commonwealth Federation (CCF).

His first campaign as a candidate for political office was as a CCF candidate in the 1953 provincial election. He ran in the constituency of Assiniboia and was only narrowly defeated by the incumbent MLA, Reg Wightman.

He ran unsuccessfully in several subsequent Provincial elections and once as a Federal CCF candidate in 1957.

In the 1950s Mackling and Howard Pawley were regarded as rebels against the CCF establishment in Manitoba. Both opposed the party's decision to dissolve itself into the New Democratic Party. They opposed the new party structure that gave labour unions a separate voting status within the new party.

=== Political career ===
Mackling was finally elected to the Manitoba Legislative Assembly in the 1969 election. He was named Attorney General of Manitoba on July 16, 1969, and held the position for the Schreyer government's first term in office. He also served as Minister of Consumer and Corporate Affairs from December 18, 1969, to August 1970.

As Attorney General, Mackling sought to develop better police-public cooperation introducing a system of cautions for highway traffic first offences and established a Manitoba Police Commission. He established the first Human Rights Commission, the first Ombudsman's Office, the first Law Reform Commission, the first publicly funded Legal Aid system, and the first Criminal Injuries Compensation Program. Under his guidance, numerous old regulatory systems were revised, including the Expropriation Act and the Landlord and Tenant Act. In revising the Landlord and Tenant Act, the old "right of restraint"—whereby landlords could seize a tenant's furniture—was abolished and replaced by security deposits and a Rentalsman's Office was created to adjudicate tenancy disputes.

There was one issue in Mackling's tenure as Attorney General that was quite controversial. He was regarded as unnecessarily dogmatic by some members of the NDP Caucus and by some civil libertarians for shutting down a theatre which was screening the film Last Tango in Paris without consulting other government ministers. His position was that as Attorney General he could not and would not allow possible political repercussions to influence law enforcement. The Criminal Code defined a combination of violence with a sexual act as obscene and since a violent sexual act was depicted in the movie, it was obscene.

He was defeated in the 1973 provincial election. His St. James constituents were angry that he had supported legislation passed by his government that eliminated the City of St. James and merged it with the City of Winnipeg. St. James had been a very prosperous and successful city and his constituents vented their displeasure on him.

After his defeat in 1973 he returned to legal practice but was persuaded in 1974 to take on chairmanship of the Manitoba Transport Board and the Manitoba Highways Board. During his highly successful tenure as Chairman of the Transport Board he became Chairman of a Canadian Council of Motor Transport Administrators (CCMTA) committee where he worked to harmonize motor transport regulations.

In 1981 his friend and former colleague, Howard Pawley, persuaded him to run in the upcoming election. He won and defeated George Minaker, a Progressive Conservative government minister who had defeated him in 1973.

In 1982 he was appointed Minister of Natural Resources. During his tenure he successfully led the establishment of provincial park planning including the designation of part of the Whiteshell Provincial Park as a wilderness area, the establishment of Atikaki as a wilderness park, the establishment of the first forestry practices guidelines, the restoration of freshwater fish migration through fish ladders and the removal of unnecessary dams and culverts.

In 1985 following the death of then Labour Minister Mary Beth Dolin, Mackling was appointed Minister of Labour with responsibility for the Manitoba Telephone System Act, the Civil Service Act, the Civil Service Superannuation Act, the Civil Service Supplementary Severance Benefit Act, and the Public Servants' Insurance Act. He was reelected in the 1986 election against a challenge from a popular Progressive Conservative, Eldon Ross.

On April 17, 1986, he continued as Minister of Labour and as Minister Responsible for the Manitoba Telephone System and also took on the Ministry of Consumer and Corporate Affairs.

The NDP government was unexpectedly defeated in the Legislature in early 1988 as a result of the defection of Jim Walding, a disgruntled caucus member. Mackling decided not to contest the 1988 election and has not returned to provincial political life since that time.

Mackling was the NDP candidate in the federal riding of Provencher during the 2011 federal election. He came second behind Conservative candidate Vic Toews, capturing about 18% of the popular vote.

=== Personal ===
He and his wife Patricia Taeko Ono were married in 1956. Patricia's mother, Lucille Ono, was a devoted supporter of the CCF and NDP. In her honour the Manitoba New Democratic Party presents an annual award to a member of the Party in recognition of his or her dedicated support.
