= Joseph Prefontaine =

Canadian politician

Joseph H. Prefontaine (1859 – December 26, 1937) was a farmer and political figure in Manitoba. He represented Assiniboia from 1903 to 1907 in the Legislative Assembly of Manitoba as a Liberal.

He came to Manitoba, settling near St. Eustache. He was married to Georgina Senecal. Prefontaine was reeve for the Rural Municipality of St. Francois Xavier from 1901 to 1903. He was defeated when he ran for reelection to the Manitoba assembly in 1907. Prefontaine later served on the council for the Rural Municipality of Cartier.

In 1912, he moved to the area near what is now Lisieux, Saskatchewan. The first hamlet established there was named "Joeville" in 1917 after Prefontaine, one of the first settlers in the area.

Prefontaine died in hospital in Gravelbourg at the age of 78 after a long illness.

His cousin Albert Prefontaine also served in the provincial assembly.
