= Adrien Sala =

Canadian politician

The Honourable Adrien Sala MLA

Manitoba Minister of Finance
- Incumbent
- Assumed office October 18, 2023
- Premier: Wab Kinew
- Preceded by: Cliff Cullen

Member of the Legislative Assembly of Manitoba for St. James
- Incumbent
- Assumed office September 10, 2019
- Preceded by: Scott Johnston

Personal details
- Born: January 18, 1980 (age 46) Thompson, Manitoba, Canada
- Party: New Democratic
- Education: University of Manitoba (BCom, MSc)

Adrien Sala (born January 18, 1980) is a Canadian politician who has been Minister of Finance for Manitoba since October 18, 2023. A member of the Manitoba New Democratic Party (NDP), Sala has represented St. James in the Legislative Assembly of Manitoba since 2019.

== Life and career ==
Adrien Sala was born in Thompson, Manitoba. He graduated from College Jeanne-Sauve in south Winnipeg and went on to study business at the I.H. Asper School of Business at the University of Manitoba, where he completed a Bachelor of Commerce degree in 2003. After graduating, he began his career working with youth, serving non-profit organizations in Winnipeg's West Broadway community, and would later go on to leadership roles with community programs serving underhoused and gang-involved youth in the West Broadway neighbourhood. During his time managing a community jobs program supporting underhoused youth, he returned to the University of Manitoba, where he completed a Master's of Science (MSc) degree focused on examining the ways homeless and underhoused youth were using information communication technologies to access the resources and supports they needed.

Sala later began working as a provincial civil servant with the Department of Housing and Community Development, where he worked in support of the delivery of social and affordable housing programming. In 2016, he took on a role within the financial services sector, eventually becoming the director of strategy and operations for Assiniboine Credit Union, one of the largest community-owned financial institutions in Manitoba. During this time, he studied project management at the University of Winnipeg. He became accredited as a Project Management Professional (PMP). Prior to running for office, Adrien also served as a board member with the John Howard Society of Manitoba, as well as with the Centre for Aboriginal Human Resource Development.

Sala is also a songwriter who released two solo albums, High Water Everywhere (2006) and Diamond in the Mind (2009) on the Dollartone Records label. He often performed at Winnipeg's well known Times Changed High and Lonesome Club. Sala later recorded two albums with Winnipeg folk group Jackpine, Brand New Good Old Days (2009) and Cabbage (2010).

He was appointed finance minister by premier Wab Kinew in 2023. The government's 2026 budget reported a $498 million deficit and included provisions such as the elimination of the provincial sales tax on groceries and the continuation of a price freeze on one-litre milk cartons.

== Electoral record ==
2023 Manitoba general election: St. James
Party	Candidate	Votes	%	±%	Expenditures
New Democratic	Adrien Sala	5,448	64.82	+17.56	$25,571.43
Progressive Conservative	Tim Diack	2,326	27.67	-5.16	$17,274.06
Liberal	Randell Cacayuran	631	7.51	-2.88	$0.00
Total valid votes/expense limit		8,405	99.55	–	$60,907.00
Total rejected, unmarked and declined ballots		38	0.45	–	
Turnout		8,443	54.68	-0.99	
Eligible voters		15,442			
New Democratic hold		Swing		+11.36	
Source(s) Source: Elections Manitoba

2019 Manitoba general election: St. James
Party	Candidate	Votes	%	±%	Expenditures
New Democratic	Adrien Sala	4,002	47.25	+12.3	$20,052.47
Progressive Conservative	Michelle Richards	2,781	32.84	-6.1	$45,848.85
Liberal	Bernd Hohne	880	10.39	-2.5	$3,102.61
Green	Jeff Buhse	806	9.52	-0.6	$939.40
Total valid votes		8,469	–	–	
Rejected		41	–		
Eligible voters / turnout		15,288	55.40%	-5.91%	
New Democratic gain from Progressive Conservative		Swing		+9.2	
Source(s) Source: Manitoba. Chief Electoral Officer (2019). Statement of Votes for the 42nd Provincial General Election, September 10, 2019 (PDF) (Report). Winnipeg: Elections Manitoba.
