= St. James-Assiniboia =

- Suburb
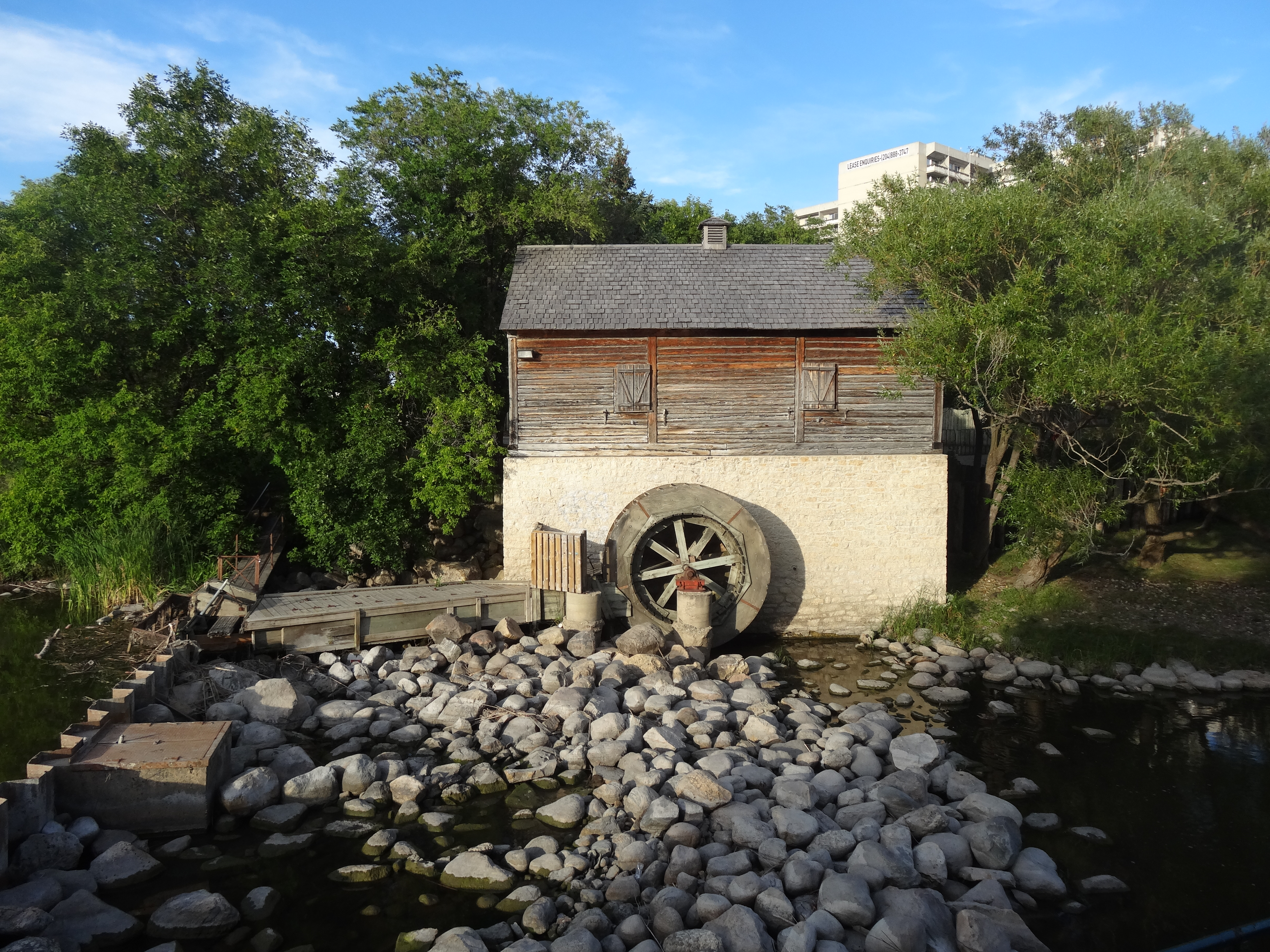
- Grant's Old Mill on Sturgeon Creek.
- Interactive map of St. James-Assiniboia
- Coordinates: 49°53′09″N 97°14′34″W
- Country: Canada
- Province: Manitoba
- City: Winnipeg
- Established as municipality: 1886
- Named for: Parish of St. James and the Assiniboine River

Government
  - MP: Doug Eyolfson (Charleswood—St. James—Assiniboia—Headingley)
  - MLAs: Adrien Sala (St. James); Nellie Kennedy (Assiniboia)
  - Councillors: Shawn Dobson (St. James); Evan Duncan (Charleswood – Tuxedo – Westwood)

Area
  - Metro: 5,306.79 km^{2} (2,048.96 sq mi)

Population (2011)
  - Suburb: 61,764
  - Metro: 778,489

St. James-Assiniboia is a major community area in Winnipeg, Manitoba, Canada. As it encapsulates most of the city ward of St. James, which includes the major St. James Street, the area itself is often simply referred to "St. James."

Located in the far western part of the city, it is bounded on the north by the Rural Municipality of Rosser and the Canadian National Railway's Oak Point line, on the south by the Assiniboine River, on the west by the Rural Municipality of Headingley, and on the east by the Canadian Pacific Railway's La Riviere line.

The area today is composed of the several municipalities that existed prior to the amalgamation of Winnipeg in 1971/1972. It began in 1886 as the Rural Municipality of Assiniboia, parts of which broke off to form the RM of St. James in 1921 and the Village of Brooklands in 1922. In 1956, the RM of St. James was incorporated as the City of St. James, absorbing Brooklands 11 years later. In 1969, St. James and Assiniboia merged into the City of St. James-Assiniboia, remaining as such until the 1972 amalgamation.

== Geography and governance ==
"St. James-Assiniboia" refers to the community area defined by the 2016 Canadian census, and can be divided into the neighbourhood clusters of St. James-Assiniboia East and St. James-Assiniboia West.

"St. James," on the other hand, is the electoral ward used by the Winnipeg City Council for local governing purposes. The 2018–2022 councillor for the St. James Ward is Scott Gillingham.

Despite significant overlap, the geography of St. James differs slightly from that of St. James-Assiniboia; the latter extends more west/southwestward and reaches the Assiniboine River, but it does not extend as far east as the St. James ward does. More specifically:

- contrast to St. James, the St. James-Assiniboia area includes the neighbourhoods of Assiniboia Downs, Glendale, Kirkfield, and Westwood, which are part of the Charleswood – Tuxedo – Westwood electoral ward, currently represented by Kevin Klein.
- contrast to St. James-Assiniboia, the St. James ward includes the neighbourhoods of Polo Park and West Wolseley, which are part of the Downtown community area (or Downtown West neighbourhood cluster).

=== St. James-Assiniboia area ===
Located in the western section of Winnipeg, it is bounded on the north by the Rural Municipality of Rosser and the Canadian National Railway's Oak Point line, on the south by the Assiniboine River, on the west by the Rural Municipality of Headingley, and on the east by the Canadian Pacific Railway's La Riviere line.

St. James-Assiniboia is composed of the following neighbourhoods: Airport, Assiniboia Downs, Birchwood, Booth, Bruce Park, Buchanan, Crestview, Deer Lodge, Glendale, Jameswood, Kirkfield, Heritage Park, Kensington, King Edward, Murray Industrial Park, Omand's Creek Industrial, Saskatchewan North, Silver Heights, St. James Industrial, Sturgeon Creek, Westwood, and Woodhaven.

=== St. James ward ===
St. James is the electoral ward used by the Winnipeg City Council for local governing purposes.

The ward includes the major St. James Street, as well the following neighbourhoods: Airport, Birchwood, Booth, Bruce Park, Buchanan, Crestview Deer Lodge, Heritage Park, Jameswood, Kensington, King Edward, Murray Industrial Park, Polo Park, Saskatchewan North, Silver Heights, St. James Industrial, Sturgeon Creek, West Wolseley, and Woodhaven. Of note, although for census purposes the Polo Park neighbourhood is considered part of the Downtown area rather than St. James-Assiniboia, it is considered part of the city ward of St. James.

Located along Portage Avenue, the greater St. James area was one of the original districts of Winnipeg, with the Royal Canadian Air Force 17 Wing base located in its central hub.

The ward boundary is legally described as the following:

Commence at Sturgeon Road and Portage Avenue; Westward on Portage Ave to the Perimeter Highway; Northward on Perimeter Hwy to city limit (Perimeter Hwy and Saskatchewan Ave); Northward, following along the city limit to Brookside Boulevard; Northward on Brookside to north limit of Lot Z21 Plan 34260; Southward on North Limit of Lot Z21 Plan 34260 to Notre Dame Avenue; Eastward on Notre Dame Ave to CPR Lariviere; Southward on CPR Lariviere to the Assiniboine River; Westward on the Assiniboine River to west limit of Lot 30 Plan 20337; Northward on the west limit of Lot 30 Plan 20337 to the north limit of Lot 30 Plan 20337; Eastward on the northwest limit of Lot 30 Plan 20337 to Harris Boulevard; Northward on Harris Blvd to south limit of Lot 1 Block 1 Plan 599; Westward on south limit of Lot 1 Block 1 Plan 5996 and its easterly extension to the west limit of Lot 6; Block 1 Plan 5996; North on the west limit of Lot 6 Block 1 Plan 5996 and its northerly extension to the point of commencement.

== History ==
Historically, the area was a farming community along the north bank of the Assiniboine River populated by an Anglo-Métis, or mixed Scottish/English and Indigenous population, compared to the French-speaking Métis people who settled further upriver at St. François Xavier, Manitoba and along the east banks of the Assiniboine River. Before the province of Manitoba was created in 1870, Assiniboia—named after the river that runs by it, itself named for the Assiniboine First Nation—was governed by the Council of Assiniboia (1835–1870).

In 1853, the Church of England was given a grant of land from the Hudson's Bay Company from which they formed the Parish of St. James. Following the creation of Manitoba, the area of the Parish of St. James was administered by the provincial government; municipal incorporation soon followed. When Treaty 1 was signed in 1871 with the Chippewa (Anishinabe) and Cree Indigenous Peoples, settlement into the region increased and municipal development likewise accelerated.

Within a decade, in 1880, the Province of Manitoba divided its entire area into municipalities, creating the Rural Municipality of Assiniboia and two other municipalities that surrounded the City of Winnipeg. The first council for the RM of Assiniboia met that year, with William Tait as warden. This new municipality encompassed the former parishes of St. James, Headingley, St. Charles, and part of St. Boniface.

The development of these communities as residential suburbs of Winnipeg began in the early 20th century and was greatly enhanced by the extension of streetcar service to Deer Lodge in 1903, the opening of Assiniboine Park in 1904 and its location along Portage Avenue, and proximity to downtown Winnipeg. In 1921, the RM of Assiniboia was partitioned, wherein it maintained its rural parts while its more urban area was incorporated as the Rural Municipality of St. James. The first council for the RM of St. James met that year, with J. W. Godkin as reeve. The following year, the RM of Assiniboia was further divided with the creation of the Village of Brooklands.

The area grew rapidly from 1945 to 1970 with the construction of the Silver Heights and Birchwood subdivisions in the 1940s and 1950s, and Westwood, Crestview, and St. Charles in the 1960s. In 1956, the RM of St. James became the City of St. James. The first council for the new city met on that year on April 17, with T. D. Findlay as mayor.

The late 1960s saw the three communities of Assiniboia, Brooklands, and St. James finally join together again: in 1967, Brooklands was merged into St. James, followed in 1968 by the RM of Assiniboia merging with St. James to form the City of St. James-Assiniboia. The first council for the new City of St. James-Assiniboia met on 7 January 1969, with Alfred William Hanks as mayor.

Map showing the former boundaries of the City of St. James-Assiniboia.

In 1972, the City of St. James-Assiniboia was dissolved and formally amalgamated with the City of Winnipeg and 11 other municipalities to create a unicity.

As the community was developed, by the early 1970s, as far as the Perimeter Highway (Winnipeg's unofficial urban limit), St. James has seen very little development since that time. From 1971 to 2001, the population declined from 66,150 to 58,590 (as per Statistics Canada). The population further declined to 57,855 as of the 2006 census. However, by the 2011 census, it had increased to 61,764.

The City of Winnipeg Archives holds the St. James-Assiniboia Fonds, which includes by-laws and minutes.

=== Former reeves and mayors ===
Prior to the amalgamation of Winnipeg in 1971/1972, the St. James-Assiniboia area was its own municipality (City of St. James-Assiniboia), preceded by other smaller municipalities, all of which had their own reeves (for rural municipalities) or mayors (for cities).

Rural Municipality of Assiniboia
Term	Reeve/mayor
1886–88	James Green (c. 1847–1892)
1888–89	John William Tait
1890	John Taylor (1834–1925)
1891	unknown
1892–1900	Alexander Murray (1839–1913)
1901–03	Charles George Caron (c. 1851–1912)
1904	William Bourke (1863–1943)
1905	Alexander Murray
1906	G. G. Caron
1907–09	Samuel Jacob Thompson (1845–1909)
1909–11	George Thomas Chapman (1861–1940)
1912	Joseph J. McMillan
1913	William Mactavish Bannatyne (1864–1931)
1914	D. Shelmerdine
1915–16	D. C. McColl
1917	Charles Holden
1918–20	Charles Leonard Richardson (1884–1939)
1921–22	James H. Black
1923–24	John Lawson McBride (1879–1959)
1925–32	John Bunting
1933–39	John Salmon Lamont (1885–1964)
1940–41	John B. Johnson
1942–43	Eric D. Bullock
1944–45	John B. Johnson
1946–47	B. Findlay
1948–59	Joseph Henry Sansome (1907–1983)
1960–61	W. H. “Harry” Morgan (c. 1899–1961)
1962–67	John Harold Belows (1914–2003)
1968	W. J. Turner
1969	Merged with St. James into St. James-Assiniboia

St. James
Term	Reeve/mayor
RM of St. James (1921) City of St. James (1956)
1921	Joseph William Godkin
1922–23	John George Smith (1873–1947)
1924	Alexander “Alex” Christie (1878–1947)
1925–29	Joseph Henry Cotter (1872–1937)
1930–32	Alexander Christie
1933–37	Ronald Henry Hooper (1885–1969)
1938–45	David Alexander Best (1880–1949)
1946–53	Reginald Frederick Wightman (1899–1981)
1954–61	Thomas Burns Findlay (1902–1972)
1960–69	Alfred William "Bill" Hanks (1894–1985)
City of St. James-Assiniboia
1970–71	Alfred William "Bill" Hanks (1894–1985)

== Demographics ==
Federal census population history of St. James-Assiniboia
Year	Pop.	±%
1956	26,502	—
1961	33,977	+28.2%
1966	35,685	+5.0%
1971	71,431	+100.2%
Source: Statistics Canada

St. James-Assiniboia is primarily residential and is mainly a middle-class area but there are poorer pockets in the eastern part of St. James, and wealthier areas near the St. Charles Country Club, and along the Assiniboine River. Historically, the area was a farming community along the north bank of the Assiniboine River populated by an Anglo-Métis, or mixed Scottish/English and aboriginal population, compared to the French-speaking Métis people who settled further upriver at St. François Xavier, Manitoba, and along the east banks of the Assiniboine River.

Population history following amalgamation
Year	Pop.	±%
1971	66,150	—
1976	69,970	+5.8%
1981	66,720	−4.6%
1986	65,600	−1.7%
1991	62,370	−4.9%
1996	60,735	−2.6%
2001	58,590	−3.5%
2006	57,855	−1.3%
2011	61,764	+6.8%

== Notable people ==
- Bob Brown, Wrestler
- Brent Fitz, Musician
- Bif Naked, Singer
- Maurice Smith, sports editor of the Winnipeg Free Press
- Harry Taylor, Professional hockey player

== Sports, recreation, and leisure ==
There is some industrial development in the Murray Industrial Park in the north central part of the neighbourhood and near the Winnipeg James Armstrong Richardson International Airport, which is located in St. James. There is substantial commercial development along Portage Avenue, the area's main thoroughfare, and near the western edge of the community near the Perimeter Highway, where the Unicity Shopping Mall once stood.

=== Junior hockey teams ===
Team	Founded	League	Arena	Championships*
Winnipeg Saints	1956	MJHL	St. James Civic Centre (2011−2012)	0
St. James Canucks	1978	MMJHL	St. James Civic Centre (1978−)	1
St. James Canadians (defunct)	1956	MJHL	St. James Civic Centre (1967−2004)	3

* refers to championships won while playing in St. James

=== St. James Civic Centre ===
The St. James Civic Centre is a public recreation complex that serves the western part of Winnipeg. The complex, which was built in 1967, features an indoor ice hockey arena, swimming pool, and auditorium, and is owned and operated by the City of Winnipeg. It is home to the St. James Canucks of the Manitoba Major Junior Hockey League and previously home to the St. James Canadians and Winnipeg Saints of the Manitoba Junior Hockey League.

== See also ==
- St. James-Assiniboia School Division
- St. James Street (Winnipeg)
