= Assiniboia (provincial electoral district) =

Provincial electoral district in Manitoba, Canada

Coordinates: 49.914°N 97.295°W

Manitoba electoral district

Provincial electoral district
- Legislature: Legislative Assembly of Manitoba
MLA
Nellie Kennedy
New Democratic
- First contested: 1888
- Last contested: 2023

Assiniboia is a provincial electoral district of Manitoba, Canada. It was first created for the 1879 provincial election, was eliminated in 1888, and was re-established in 1903. It is located in the westernmost tip of the city of Winnipeg.

Assiniboia is bordered on the east by St. James and Lakeside, to the south by Kirkfield Park, to the north by Lakeside, and to the west by Morris.

The riding's population in 1996 was 20,441. In 1999, the average family income was $53,881, and the unemployment rate was 6.50%. Retail trade accounts for 15% of the riding's industry.

Until 1920, Assiniboia was a marginal riding between the Manitoba Liberal Party and Conservative Party. Between 1920 and 1949, it was a hotly contested riding between the Conservatives and candidates of the Independent Labour Party and Manitoba Co-operative Commonwealth Federation (CCF).

The riding was dominated by the Liberals from 1949 until 1977, and then by the Progressive Conservatives from 1977 to 1999. The New Democratic Party of Manitoba's (NDP) victory in 1999 was completely unexpected, and occurred by a margin of only three votes.

The NDP took the seat in the 2023 Manitoba general election.

== Members of the Legislative Assembly ==
| Assembly | Years | Member | Party |
|---|---|---|---|
| 4th | 1879-1883 | Alexander Murray | Liberal-Conservative |
| 5th | 1883–1886 | Alexander Murray | Liberal-Conservative |
| 6th | 1886–1888 | Alexander Murray | Liberal-Conservative |
| 6th | 1888 | Duncan MacArthur | Liberal |
Riding abolished from 1888 to 1903
| 11th | 1903–1907 | Joseph Prefontaine | Liberal |
| 12th | 1907–1910 | Aimé Bénard | Conservative |
| 13th | 1910–1914 | Aimé Bénard | Conservative |
| 14th | 1914–1915 | John Thomas Haig | Conservative |
| 14th | 1915–1920 | John W. Wilton | Liberal |
| 16th | 1920 | William Bayley | Dominion Labour |
| 16th | 1920–1922 | William Bayley | Independent Labour |
| 17th | 1922–1927 | William Bayley | Independent Labour |
| 18th | 1927–1932 | Joseph Cotter | Conservative |
| 19th | 1932–1936 | Ralph Webb | Conservative |
| 20th | 1936–1941 | James Aiken | Independent Labour/Co-operative Commonwealth Federation |
| 21st | 1941–1945 | David Best | Conservative/Progressive Conservative |
| 22nd | 1945–1949 | Ernest Draffin | Co-operative Commonwealth Federation |
| 23rd | 1949–1953 | Reginald Wightman | Liberal-Progressive |
| 24th | 1953–1958 | Reginald Wightman | Liberal-Progressive |
| 25th | 1958–1959 | Donovan Swailes | Co-operative Commonwealth Federation |
| 26th | 1959–1962 | George Johnson | Progressive Conservative |
| 27th | 1962–1966 | Stephen Patrick | Liberal |
| 28th | 1966–1969 | Stephen Patrick | Liberal |
| 29th | 1969–1973 | Stephen Patrick | Liberal |
| 30th | 1973–1977 | Stephen Patrick | Liberal |
| 31st | 1977–1981 | Norma Price | Progressive Conservative |
| 32nd | 1981–1986 | Ric Nordman | Progressive Conservative |
| 33rd | 1986–1988 | Ric Nordman | Progressive Conservative |
| 34th | 1988–1990 | Ed Mandrake | Liberal |
| 35th | 1990–1995 | Linda McIntosh | Progressive Conservative |
| 36th | 1995–1999 | Linda McIntosh | Progressive Conservative |
| 37th | 1999–2003 | Jim Rondeau | New Democratic |
| 38th | 2003–2007 | Jim Rondeau | New Democratic |
| 39th | 2007–2011 | Jim Rondeau | New Democratic |
| 40th | 2011–2016 | Jim Rondeau | New Democratic |
| 41st | 2016–2017 | Steven Fletcher | Progressive Conservative |
| 41st | 2017–2018 | Steven Fletcher | Independent |
| 41st | 2018–2019 | Steven Fletcher | Manitoba |
| 41st | 2019–2019 | Steven Fletcher | Manitoba First (Note: The Manitoba Party was renamed Manitoba First on August 6, 2019.) |
| 42nd | 2019–2023 | Scott Johnston | Progressive Conservative |
| 43rd | 2023–present | Nellie Kennedy | New Democratic |

== Election results ==
=== 2023 ===
2023 Manitoba general election
| Party | Candidate | Votes | % | ±% | Expenditures |
|---|---|---|---|---|---|
| New Democratic | Nellie Kennedy | 4,722 | 50.02 | +14.55 | $22,718.51 |
| Progressive Conservative | Scott Johnston | 3,806 | 40.31 | -3.94 | $47,635.37 |
| Liberal | Charles Ward | 913 | 9.67 | -3.76 | $14,259.80 |
| Total valid votes/expense limit | | 9,441 | 99.55 | – | $66,377.00 |
| Total rejected and declined ballots | | 43 | 0.45 | – | |
| Turnout | | 9,484 | 55.70 | +1.00 | |
| Eligible voters | | 17,028 | | | |
| New Democratic gain from Progressive Conservative | | Swing | | +9.25 | |
Source(s) Source: Elections Manitoba

=== 2019 ===
2019 Manitoba general election
| Party | Candidate | Votes | % | ±% | Expenditures |
|---|---|---|---|---|---|
| Progressive Conservative | Scott Johnston | 4,108 | 44.25 | -0.8 | $28,181.41 |
| New Democratic | Joe McKellep | 3,292 | 35.46 | +6.9 | $16,473.46 |
| Liberal | Jeff Anderson | 1,247 | 13.43 | -5.4 | $3,838.59 |
| Green | John Delaat | 636 | 6.85 | -0.5 | $0.00 |
| Total valid votes | | 9,283 | 99.37 | – | |
| Rejected | | 59 | 0.63 | | |
| Turnout | | 9,342 | 54.70 | | |
| Eligible voters | | 17,080 | | | |
| Progressive Conservative hold | | Swing | | -3.9 | |
Source(s) Source: Manitoba. Chief Electoral Officer (2019). Statement of Votes for the 42nd Provincial General Election, September 10, 2019 (PDF) (Report). Winnipeg: Elections Manitoba. "Candidate Election Returns". Elections Manitoba. Elections Manitoba.

=== 2016 ===
2016 provincial election redistributed results
| Party | % |
|---|---|
| Progressive Conservative | 45.1 |
| New Democratic | 28.6 |
| Liberal | 18.8 |
| Green | 7.4 |

2016 Manitoba general election
| Party | Candidate | Votes | % | ±% | Expenditures |
|---|---|---|---|---|---|
| Progressive Conservative | Steven Fletcher | 3,450 | 43.91 | 6.68 | $36,925.05 |
| New Democratic | Joe McKellep | 2,196 | 27.95 | -30.27 | $40,672.27 |
| Liberal | Ian McCausland | 1,631 | 20.76 | 18.54 | $9,610.69 |
| Green | Ileana Ohlsson | 580 | 7.38 | 5.05 | $0.00 |
| Total valid votes | | 7,857 | – | – | |
| Rejected | | 108 | – | | |
| Eligible voters / turnout | | 13,371 | 59.57 | -2.43 | |
Source(s) Source: Manitoba. Chief Electoral Officer (2016). Statement of Votes for the 41st Provincial General Election, April 19, 2016 (PDF) (Report). Winnipeg: Elections Manitoba. "Election Returns: 41st General Election". Elections Manitoba. 2016.

=== 2011 ===
2011 Manitoba general election
| Party | Candidate | Votes | % | ±% | Expenditures |
|---|---|---|---|---|---|
| New Democratic | Jim Rondeau | 5,095 | 58.22 | -3.99 | $36,949.80 |
| Progressive Conservative | Susan Auch | 3,258 | 37.23 | 4.95 | $46,399.77 |
| Green | Anlina Sheng | 204 | 2.33 | – | $1.00 |
| Liberal | Moe Bokhari | 194 | 2.22 | -3.30 | $1,812.80 |
| Total valid votes | | 8,751 | 99.61 | – | |
| Rejected/Declined Ballots | | 34 | 0.39 | | |
| Eligible voters / turnout | | 14,170 | 62.00 | 0.15 | |
Source(s) Source: Manitoba. Chief Electoral Officer (2011). Statement of Votes for the 40th Provincial General Election, October 4, 2011 (PDF) (Report). Winnipeg: Elections Manitoba. "Election Returns: 40th General Election". Elections Manitoba. 2011.

=== 2007 ===
2007 Manitoba general election
| Party | Candidate | Votes | % | ±% | Expenditures |
|---|---|---|---|---|---|
| New Democratic | Jim Rondeau | 5,177 | 62.21 | -0.84 | $33,430.38 |
| Progressive Conservative | Kelly de Groot | 2,686 | 32.28 | 4.63 | $32,070.95 |
| Liberal | Bernie Bellan | 459 | 5.52 | -2.53 | $340.32 |
| Total valid votes | | 8,322 | – | – | |
| Rejected | | 51 | – | | |
| Eligible voters / turnout | | 13,538 | 61.85 | 1.98 | |
Source(s) Source: Manitoba. Chief Electoral Officer (2007). Statement of Votes for the 39th Provincial General Election, May 22, 2007 (PDF) (Report). Winnipeg: Elections Manitoba.

=== 2003 ===
2003 Manitoba general election
| Party | Candidate | Votes | % | ±% | Expenditures |
|---|---|---|---|---|---|
| New Democratic | Jim Rondeau | 5,147 | 63.05 | 18.82 | $24,846.66 |
| Progressive Conservative | Dennis Wishanski | 2,257 | 27.65 | -16.56 | $23,921.25 |
| Liberal | Monique Graboski | 657 | 8.05 | -3.51 | $5,664.36 |
| Green | Jesse Tottle | 102 | 1.25 | – | $14.14 |
| Total valid votes | | 8,163 | – | – | |
| Rejected | | 22 | – | | |
| Eligible voters / turnout | | 13,671 | 59.87 | -12.49 | |
Source(s) Source: Manitoba. Chief Electoral Officer (2003). Statement of Votes for the 38th Provincial General Election, June 3, 2003 (PDF) (Report). Winnipeg: Elections Manitoba.

=== 1999 ===
1999 Manitoba general election
| Party | Candidate | Votes | % | ±% | Expenditures |
|---|---|---|---|---|---|
| New Democratic | Jim Rondeau | 4,347 | 44.24 | 24.01 | $12,989.00 |
| Progressive Conservative | Linda McIntosh | 4,344 | 44.20 | -8.75 | $26,190.58 |
| Liberal | J. Deborah Shiloff | 1,136 | 11.56 | -15.26 | $5,744.56 |
| Total valid votes | | 9,827 | – | – | |
| Rejected | | 53 | – | | |
| Eligible voters / turnout | | 13,653 | 72.37 | 1.60 | |
Source(s) Source: Manitoba. Chief Electoral Officer (1999). Statement of Votes for the 37th Provincial General Election, September 21, 1999 (PDF) (Report). Winnipeg: Elections Manitoba.

=== 1995 ===
1995 Manitoba general election
| Party | Candidate | Votes | % | ±% |
|---|---|---|---|---|
| Progressive Conservative | Linda McIntosh | 4,315 | 52.96 | 3.11 |
| Liberal | Allan Green | 2,185 | 26.82 | -6.75 |
| New Democratic | Jo-Anne Swayze | 1,648 | 20.23 | 3.65 |
| Total valid votes | | 8,148 | – | – |
| Rejected | | 22 | – | |
| Eligible voters / Turnout | | 11,545 | 70.77 | 0.94 |
Source(s) Source: Manitoba. Chief Electoral Officer (1999). Statement of Votes for the 37th Provincial General Election, September 21, 1999 (PDF) (Report). Winnipeg: Elections Manitoba.

=== 1990 ===
1990 Manitoba general election
| Party | Candidate | Votes | % | ±% |
|---|---|---|---|---|
| Progressive Conservative | Linda McIntosh | 4,054 | 49.85 | 7.68 |
| Liberal | Ed Mandrake | 2,730 | 33.57 | -10.72 |
| New Democratic | Joan Johannson | 1,348 | 16.58 | 4.92 |
| Total valid votes | | 8,132 | – | – |
| Rejected | | 18 | – | |
| Eligible voters / turnout | | 11,672 | 69.83 | -4.63 |
Source(s) Source: Manitoba. Chief Electoral Officer (1999). Statement of Votes for the 37th Provincial General Election, September 21, 1999 (PDF) (Report). Winnipeg: Elections Manitoba.

=== 1988 ===
1988 Manitoba general election
| Party | Candidate | Votes | % | ±% |
|---|---|---|---|---|
| Liberal | Ed Mandrake | 3,918 | 44.29 | 25.62 |
| Progressive Conservative | Ric Nordman | 3,731 | 42.18 | -9.44 |
| New Democratic | Robert Johannson | 1,031 | 11.65 | -18.06 |
| Western Independence | Linda Cress | 166 | 1.88 | – |
| Total valid votes | | 8,846 | – | – |
| Rejected | | 13 | – | |
| Eligible voters / Turnout | | 11,898 | 74.46 | 10.41 |
Source(s) Source: Manitoba. Chief Electoral Officer (1999). Statement of Votes for the 37th Provincial General Election, September 21, 1999 (PDF) (Report). Winnipeg: Elections Manitoba.

=== 1986 ===
1986 Manitoba general election
| Party | Candidate | Votes | % | ±% |
|---|---|---|---|---|
| Progressive Conservative | Ric Nordman | 3,813 | 51.62 | 1.69 |
| New Democratic | Max Melnyk | 2,195 | 29.71 | -5.46 |
| Liberal | Stan Blady | 1,379 | 18.67 | 8.48 |
| Total valid votes | | 7,387 | – | – |
| Rejected | | 26 | – | |
| Eligible voters / Turnout | | 11,575 | 64.04 | -7.29 |
Source(s) Source: Manitoba. Chief Electoral Officer (1999). Statement of Votes for the 37th Provincial General Election, September 21, 1999 (PDF) (Report). Winnipeg: Elections Manitoba.

=== 1981 ===
1981 Manitoba general election
| Party | Candidate | Votes | % | ±% |
|---|---|---|---|---|
| Progressive Conservative | Ric Nordman | 4,006 | 49.93 | -5.29 |
| New Democratic | Max Melnyk | 2,822 | 35.17 | 20.38 |
| Liberal | Peter Moss | 817 | 10.18 | -19.81 |
| Progressive | Fran Huck | 378 | 4.71 | – |
| Total valid votes | | 8,023 | – | – |
| Rejected | | 28 | – | |
| Eligible voters / Turnout | | 11,286 | 71.34 | -11.98 |
Source(s) Source: Manitoba. Chief Electoral Officer (1999). Statement of Votes for the 37th Provincial General Election, September 21, 1999 (PDF) (Report). Winnipeg: Elections Manitoba.

=== 1977 ===
1977 Manitoba general election
| Party | Candidate | Votes | % | ±% |
|---|---|---|---|---|
| Progressive Conservative | Norma Price | 7,863 | 55.22 | 20.59 |
| Liberal | Stephen Patrick | 4,271 | 29.99 | -11.03 |
| New Democratic | Max Melnyk | 2,106 | 14.79 | -9.55 |
| Total valid votes | | 14,240 | – | – |
| Rejected | | 11 | – | |
| Eligible voters / Turnout | | 17,105 | 83.31 | -0.95 |
Source(s) Source: Manitoba. Chief Electoral Officer (1999). Statement of Votes for the 37th Provincial General Election, September 21, 1999 (PDF) (Report). Winnipeg: Elections Manitoba.

=== 1973 ===
1973 Manitoba general election
| Party | Candidate | Votes | % | ±% |
|---|---|---|---|---|
| Liberal | Stephen Patrick | 5,105 | 41.03 | 2.73 |
| Progressive Conservative | Norma Price | 4,309 | 34.63 | -3.24 |
| New Democratic | Larry Iwan | 3,029 | 24.34 | 0.51 |
| Total valid votes | | 12,443 | – | – |
| Rejected | | 26 | – | |
| Eligible voters / Turnout | | 14,797 | 84.27 | 18.46 |
Source(s) Source: Manitoba. Chief Electoral Officer (1999). Statement of Votes for the 37th Provincial General Election, September 21, 1999 (PDF) (Report). Winnipeg: Elections Manitoba.

=== 1969 ===
1969 Manitoba general election
| Party | Candidate | Votes | % | ±% |
|---|---|---|---|---|
| Liberal | Stephen Patrick | 2,355 | 38.29 | -1.74 |
| Progressive Conservative | Bill Docking | 2,329 | 37.87 | 0.69 |
| New Democratic | Curtis Nordman | 1,466 | 23.84 | 1.04 |
| Total valid votes | | 6,150 | – | – |
| Rejected | | 21 | – | |
| Eligible voters / Turnout | | 9,378 | 65.80 | 6.27 |
Source(s) Source: Manitoba. Chief Electoral Officer (1999). Statement of Votes for the 37th Provincial General Election, September 21, 1999 (PDF) (Report). Winnipeg: Elections Manitoba.

=== 1966 ===
1966 Manitoba general election
| Party | Candidate | Votes | % | ±% |
|---|---|---|---|---|
| Liberal | Stephen Patrick | 5,168 | 40.03 | 0.63 |
| Progressive Conservative | Stewart Millet | 4,800 | 37.18 | 0.69 |
| New Democratic | Charles Norman | 2,943 | 22.79 | -1.32 |
| Total valid votes | | 12,911 | – | – |
| Rejected | | 42 | – | |
| Eligible voters / Turnout | | 21,757 | 59.53 | 7.98 |
Source(s) Source: Manitoba. Chief Electoral Officer (1999). Statement of Votes for the 37th Provincial General Election, September 21, 1999 (PDF) (Report). Winnipeg: Elections Manitoba.

=== 1962 ===
1962 Manitoba general election
| Party | Candidate | Votes | % | ±% |
|---|---|---|---|---|
| Liberal | Stephen Patrick | 3,232 | 39.40 | 21.50 |
| Progressive Conservative | George William Johnson | 2,993 | 36.49 | -4.23 |
| New Democratic | A. H. Mackling | 1,978 | 24.11 | -13.81 |
| Total valid votes | | 8,203 | – | – |
| Rejected | | 43 | – | |
| Eligible voters / Turnout | | 15,996 | 51.55 | -8.52 |
Source(s) Source: Manitoba. Chief Electoral Officer (1999). Statement of Votes for the 37th Provincial General Election, September 21, 1999 (PDF) (Report). Winnipeg: Elections Manitoba.

=== 1959 ===
1959 Manitoba general election
| Party | Candidate | Votes | % | ±% |
|---|---|---|---|---|
| Progressive Conservative | George William Johnson | 3,157 | 40.71 | 1.79 |
| Co-operative Commonwealth | Donovan Swailes | 2,940 | 37.92 | -3.25 |
| Liberal–Progressive | Jack Brownrigg | 1,388 | 17.90 | -2.01 |
| Independent | George Raymond Alexander Brown | 269 | 3.47 | – |
| Total valid votes | | 7,754 | – | – |
| Rejected | | 105 | – | |
| Eligible voters / Turnout | | 13,083 | 60.07 | 9.57 |
Source(s) Source: Manitoba. Chief Electoral Officer (1999). Statement of Votes for the 37th Provincial General Election, September 21, 1999 (PDF) (Report). Winnipeg: Elections Manitoba.

=== 1958 ===
1958 Manitoba general election
| Party | Candidate | Votes | % | ±% |
|---|---|---|---|---|
| Co-operative Commonwealth | Donovan Swailes | 2,409 | 41.17 | 4.06 |
| Progressive Conservative | George William Johnson | 2,278 | 38.93 | 23.05 |
| Liberal–Progressive | David McKee Graham | 1,165 | 19.91 | -20.57 |
| Total valid votes | | 5,852 | – | – |
| Rejected | | 67 | – | |
| Eligible voters / Turnout | | 11,720 | 50.50 | -18.39 |
Source(s) Source: Manitoba. Chief Electoral Officer (1999). Statement of Votes for the 37th Provincial General Election, September 21, 1999 (PDF) (Report). Winnipeg: Elections Manitoba.

=== 1953 ===
1953 Manitoba general election
| Party | Candidate | Votes | % | ±% |
|---|---|---|---|---|
| Liberal–Progressive | Reginald Wightman | 4,196 | 40.48 | -19.62 |
| Co-operative Commonwealth | Alvin Henry Mackling | 3,846 | 37.11 | -2.79 |
| Progressive Conservative | George Edmund Fournier | 1,646 | 15.88 | – |
| Social Credit | Florence May Bloomfield | 677 | 6.53 | – |
| Total valid votes | | 10,365 | – | – |
| Rejected | | 56 | – | |
| Eligible voters / Turnout | | 15,126 | 68.89 | 20.22 |
Source(s) Source: Manitoba. Chief Electoral Officer (1999). Statement of Votes for the 37th Provincial General Election, September 21, 1999 (PDF) (Report). Winnipeg: Elections Manitoba.

=== 1949 ===
1949 Manitoba general election
| Party | Candidate | Votes | % | ±% |
|---|---|---|---|---|
| Liberal–Progressive | Reginald Wightman | 3,805 | 60.10 | – |
| Co-operative Commonwealth | Ernest Draffin | 2,526 | 39.90 | -8.32 |
| Total valid votes | | 6,331 | – | – |
| Rejected | | 58 | – | |
| Eligible voters / Turnout | | 13,125 | 48.68 | -6.25 |
Source(s) Source: Manitoba. Chief Electoral Officer (1999). Statement of Votes for the 37th Provincial General Election, September 21, 1999 (PDF) (Report). Winnipeg: Elections Manitoba.

=== 1945 ===
1945 Manitoba general election
| Party | Candidate | Votes | % | ±% |
|---|---|---|---|---|
| Co-operative Commonwealth | Ernest Draffin | 2,948 | 48.22 | 1.39 |
| Progressive Conservative | David Best | 2,778 | 45.44 | -7.73 |
| Labor–Progressive | William Cecil Ross | 388 | 6.35 | – |
| Total valid votes | | 6,114 | – | – |
| Rejected | | 77 | – | |
| Eligible voters / Turnout | | 11,272 | 54.92 | 10.21 |
Source(s) Source: Manitoba. Chief Electoral Officer (1999). Statement of Votes for the 37th Provincial General Election, September 21, 1999 (PDF) (Report). Winnipeg: Elections Manitoba.

=== 1941 ===
1941 Manitoba general election
| Party | Candidate | Votes | % | ±% |
|---|---|---|---|---|
| Conservative | David Best | 2,296 | 53.17 | 18.60 |
| Co-operative Commonwealth | James Aiken | 2,022 | 46.83 | – |
| Total valid votes | | 4,318 | – | – |
| Rejected | | 50 | – | |
| Eligible voters / Turnout | | 9,768 | 44.72 | -25.32 |
Source(s) Source: Manitoba. Chief Electoral Officer (1999). Statement of Votes for the 37th Provincial General Election, September 21, 1999 (PDF) (Report). Winnipeg: Elections Manitoba.

=== 1936 ===
1936 Manitoba general election
| Party | Candidate | Votes | % | ±% |
|---|---|---|---|---|
| Independent Labour | James Aiken | 2,897 | 43.05 | – |
| Conservative | Dr. H. P. McPhail | 2,327 | 34.58 | -11.02 |
| Liberal–Progressive | J. L. Morton | 946 | 14.06 | -2.28 |
| Social Credit | W. Sanders | 560 | 8.32 | – |
| Total valid votes | | 6,730 | – | – |
| Rejected | | 126 | – | |
| Eligible voters / Turnout | | 9,789 | 70.04 | 5.03 |
Source(s) Source: Manitoba. Chief Electoral Officer (1999). Statement of Votes for the 37th Provincial General Election, September 21, 1999 (PDF) (Report). Winnipeg: Elections Manitoba.

=== 1932 ===
1932 Manitoba general election
| Party | Candidate | Votes | % | ±% |
|---|---|---|---|---|
| Conservative | Ralph Webb | 2,813 | 45.59 | 8.53 |
| Labour | John McLean | 2,349 | 38.07 | 9.09 |
| Liberal–Progressive | John George Smith | 1,008 | 16.34 | – |
| Total valid votes | | 6,170 | – | – |
| Rejected | | N/A | – | |
| Eligible voters / Turnout | | 9,491 | 65.01 | -35.35 |
Source(s) Source: Manitoba. Chief Electoral Officer (1999). Statement of Votes for the 37th Provincial General Election, September 21, 1999 (PDF) (Report). Winnipeg: Elections Manitoba.

=== 1927 ===
1927 Manitoba general election
| Party | Candidate | Votes | % | ±% |
|---|---|---|---|---|
| Conservative | Joseph Henry Cotter | 1,963 | 37.07 | – |
| Labour | Robert B. Russell | 1,535 | 28.98 | -15.13 |
| Independent Progressive | Charles Leonard Richardson | 668 | 12.61 | – |
| Liberal | Andrew Watson Myles | 659 | 12.44 | – |
| Progressive | Alex S. Peldron | 471 | 8.89 | – |
| Total valid votes | | 5,296 | – | – |
| Rejected | | N/A | – | |
| Eligible voters / Turnout | | 5,277 | 100.36 | 24.01 |
Source(s) Source: Manitoba. Chief Electoral Officer (1999). Statement of Votes for the 37th Provincial General Election, September 21, 1999 (PDF) (Report). Winnipeg: Elections Manitoba.

=== 1922 ===
1922 Manitoba general election
| Party | Candidate | Votes | % | ±% |
|---|---|---|---|---|
| Labour | William Bayley | 1,844 | 44.11 | -7.30 |
| United Farmers | Charles Leonard Richardson | 999 | 23.90 | – |
| Independent | William Bourke | 843 | 20.17 | – |
| Independent | John Haddow | 494 | 11.82 | – |
| Total valid votes | | 4,180 | – | – |
| Rejected | | N/A | – | |
| Eligible voters / Turnout | | 5,475 | 76.35 | -8.44 |
Source(s) Source: Manitoba. Chief Electoral Officer (1999). Statement of Votes for the 37th Provincial General Election, September 21, 1999 (PDF) (Report). Winnipeg: Elections Manitoba.

=== 1920 ===
1920 Manitoba general election
| Party | Candidate | Votes | % | ±% |
|---|---|---|---|---|
| Labour | William Bayley | 2,054 | 51.41 | 16.13 |
| Independent | John W. Wilton | 1,941 | 48.59 | – |
| Total valid votes | | 3,995 | – | – |
| Rejected | | N/A | – | |
| Eligible voters / Turnout | | 4,712 | 84.78 | -0.14 |
Source(s) Source: Manitoba. Chief Electoral Officer (1999). Statement of Votes for the 37th Provincial General Election, September 21, 1999 (PDF) (Report). Winnipeg: Elections Manitoba.

=== 1915 ===
1915 Manitoba general election
| Party | Candidate | Votes | % | ±% |
|---|---|---|---|---|
| Liberal | John W. Wilton | 828 | 37.79 | 2.12 |
| Labour | William Bayley | 773 | 35.28 | 16.76 |
| Conservative | John Thomas Haig | 590 | 26.93 | -18.88 |
| Total valid votes | | 2,191 | – | – |
| Rejected | | N/A | – | |
| Eligible voters / Turnout | | 2,580 | 84.92 | -2.50 |
Source(s) Source: Manitoba. Chief Electoral Officer (1999). Statement of Votes for the 37th Provincial General Election, September 21, 1999 (PDF) (Report). Winnipeg: Elections Manitoba.

=== 1914 ===
1914 Manitoba general election
| Party | Candidate | Votes | % | ±% |
|---|---|---|---|---|
| Conservative | John Thomas Haig | 1,239 | 45.80 | -24.62 |
| Liberal | John W. Wilton | 965 | 35.67 | 30.64 |
| Labour | William J. Bartlett | 501 | 18.52 | – |
| Total valid votes | | 2,705 | – | – |
| Rejected | | N/A | – | |
| Eligible voters / Turnout | | 3,094 | 87.43 | 11.37 |
Source(s) Source: Manitoba. Chief Electoral Officer (1999). Statement of Votes for the 37th Provincial General Election, September 21, 1999 (PDF) (Report). Winnipeg: Elections Manitoba.

=== 1910 ===
1910 Manitoba general election
| Party | Candidate | Votes | % | ±% |
|---|---|---|---|---|
| Conservative | Aimé Bénard | 924 | 70.43 | 6.55 |
| Independent | Robert Andrew Bonnar | 322 | 24.54 | – |
| Liberal | John Colvin | 66 | 5.03 | -31.09 |
| Total valid votes | | 1,312 | – | – |
| Rejected | | N/A | – | |
| Eligible voters / Turnout | | 1,725 | 76.06 | -4.71 |
Source(s) Source: Manitoba. Chief Electoral Officer (1999). Statement of Votes for the 37th Provincial General Election, September 21, 1999 (PDF) (Report). Winnipeg: Elections Manitoba.

=== 1907 ===
1907 Manitoba general election
| Party | Candidate | Votes | % | ±% |
|---|---|---|---|---|
| Conservative | Aimé Bénard | 550 | 63.88 | 14.92 |
| Liberal | Joseph Prefontaine | 311 | 36.12 | -14.92 |
| Total valid votes | | 861 | – | – |
| Rejected | | N/A | – | |
| Eligible voters / Turnout | | 1,066 | 80.77 | -5.44 |
Source(s) Source: Manitoba. Chief Electoral Officer (1999). Statement of Votes for the 37th Provincial General Election, September 21, 1999 (PDF) (Report). Winnipeg: Elections Manitoba.

=== 1903 ===
1903 Manitoba general election
| Party | Candidate | Votes | % | ±% |
|---|---|---|---|---|
| Liberal | Joseph Prefontaine | 415 | 51.05 | – |
| Conservative | Charles George Caron | 398 | 48.95 | – |
| Total valid votes | | 813 | – | – |
| Rejected | | N/A | – | |
| Eligible voters / Turnout | | 943 | 86.21 | – |
Source(s) Source: Manitoba. Chief Electoral Officer (1999). Statement of Votes for the 37th Provincial General Election, September 21, 1999 (PDF) (Report). Winnipeg: Elections Manitoba.

=== 1888 by-election ===
Manitoba provincial by-election, January 10, 1888
| Party | Candidate | Votes | % | ±% |
|---|---|---|---|---|
| Unknown | Duncan MacArthur | 159 | 65.43 | – |
| Government | Frank Ness | 84 | 34.57 | – |
| Total valid votes | | 243 | – | – |
| Rejected | | N/A | – | |
| Eligible voters / Turnout | | N/A | – | – |
Source(s) Source: Manitoba. Chief Electoral Officer (1999). Statement of Votes for the 37th Provincial General Election, September 21, 1999 (PDF) (Report). Winnipeg: Elections Manitoba.

=== 1886 ===
1886 Manitoba general election
| Party | Candidate | Votes | % | ±% |
|---|---|---|---|---|
| Conservative | Alexander Murray | 149 | 62.61 | -9.36 |
| Liberal | James McKenzie Ross | 89 | 37.39 | 9.36 |
| Total valid votes | | 238 | – | – |
| Rejected | | N/A | – | |
| Eligible voters / Turnout | | 392 | 60.71 | – |
Source(s) Source: Manitoba. Chief Electoral Officer (1999). Statement of Votes for the 37th Provincial General Election, September 21, 1999 (PDF) (Report). Winnipeg: Elections Manitoba.

=== 1883 ===
1883 Manitoba general election
| Party | Candidate | Votes | % | ±% |
|---|---|---|---|---|
| Conservative | Alexander Murray | 95 | 71.97 | – |
| Liberal | James Cunningham | 37 | 28.03 | – |
| Total valid votes | | 132 | – | – |
| Rejected | | N/A | – | |
| Eligible voters / Turnout | | N/A | – | – |
Source(s) Source: Manitoba. Chief Electoral Officer (1999). Statement of Votes for the 37th Provincial General Election, September 21, 1999 (PDF) (Report). Winnipeg: Elections Manitoba.

=== 1879 ===
1879 Manitoba general election
| Party | Candidate | Votes | % |
|---|---|---|---|
| Undeclared | Alexander Murray | 187 | 63.82 |
| Undeclared | John Taylor | 106 | 36.18 |
| Total valid votes | | 293 | – |
| Rejected | | N/A | – |
| Eligible voters / Turnout | | N/A | – |
Source(s) Source: Manitoba. Chief Electoral Officer (1999). Statement of Votes for the 37th Provincial General Election, September 21, 1999 (PDF) (Report). Winnipeg: Elections Manitoba.

== Previous boundaries ==
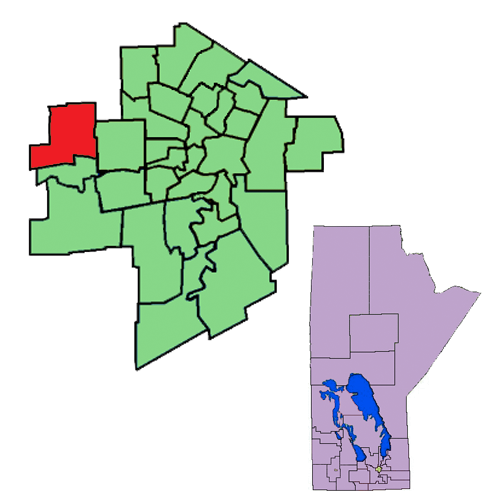
The 1999–2011 boundaries of Assiniboia highlighted in red.

== See also ==
- List of Manitoba provincial electoral districts
- Canadian provincial electoral districts
