= Sondra =

Sondra is a feminine Greek given name meaning protector of man. By 2013, the name had reportedly become quite uncommon in the United States; it had reached a peak of usage in 1939.

Notable people and characters with the name include:

== People ==
- Sondra Bianca (born 1930), American-born concert pianist and pedagogue
- Sondra Braid (1964–2004), Canadian lawyer and teacher; candidate in the Progressive Conservative Party of Manitoba candidates in the 1990 Manitoba provincial election
- Sondra Crosby, American medical doctor and professor of medicine
- Sondra Currie (born 1952), American actress
- Sondra E. Berchin (1952–2004), American entertainment- and corporate lawyer
- Sondra Erickson (born 1942), American politician
- Sondra Freckelton (1936–2019), American sculptor and watercolorist
- Sondra Gair (1924–1994), American veteran broadcast journalist
- Sondra Gilman (1926–2021), American curator, art patron, and theatre producer
- Sondra Gotlieb (born 1936), Canadian journalist and novelist
- Sondra Hale, American professor emeritus of anthropology and gender studies
- Sondra Isaminger (1956–2008), American singer and community leader
- Sondra James (1939–2021), American sound coordinator and actress
- Sondra Lee (born 1930), American former actress and dancer
- Sondra Lipton, American former fashion model, and current dancer and painter
- Sondra Locke (1944–2018), American actress and director
- Sondra London (born 1947), American true crime author
- Sondra Marshak (born 1942), American science fiction writer
- Sondra Perl, American professor emerita of English
- Sondra Perry (born 1986), American interdisciplinary artist
- Sondra Peterson (born 1935), American model
- Sondra Prill (born c. 1970), American cover singer
- Sondra Radvanovsky (born 1969), American-Canadian operatic soprano
- Sondra Rodgers (1903–1997), American film- and television actress
- Sondra Schlesinger (born 1934), American virologist and professor emeritus
- Sondra Sherman (born 1958), American painter and jewelry maker
- Sondra Theodore (born 1956), American model and actress
- Sondra van Ert (born 1964), American snowboarder

== Fictional characters ==
- Sondra Bizet, in the 1937 US adventure drama fantasy film Lost Horizon, played by Jane Wyatt
- Sondra Finchley, in the 1925 US novel An American Tragedy
- Sondra Fuller, the fourth Clayface, in the US comic books DC Comics
- Sondra McCallister, in the Home Alone film series, played by Daiana Campeanu
- Sondra Pike, in the Australian TV soap opera Neighbours, played by Cathy Godbold
- Sondra Pransky, in the 2006 romantic crime comedy film Scoop, played by Scarlett Johansson
- Sondra Tibideaux, in the US TV sitcom The Cosby Show, played by Sabrina Le Beauf

== See also ==
- Sondra (album), a 1981 album by The Sports
- Sandra (given name)
