= Manitoba Liberal Party candidates in the 1990 Manitoba provincial election =

The Manitoba Liberal Party won seven out of 57 seats in the 1990 provincial election, making the party the third-largest in the legislature. Some of the party's candidates have their own biography pages; information about others may be found here.

This page also provides information on Liberal Party candidates in by-elections between 1990 and 1995.

== Candidates ==
Riding	Candidate name	Notes	Residence	Occupation	Votes	%	Rank
Arthur–Virden	Glen McKinnon				2,085	25.88	2nd
Assiniboia	Ed Mandrake				2,730	33.57	2nd
Brandon East	Brenda Avionitis				919	10.33	3rd
Brandon West	Abby Hampton				1,428	16.73	3rd
Broadway	Avis Gray				2,400	36.84	2nd
Burrows	William Chornopyski				2,056	26.56	2nd
Charleswood	Ken Brown				2,912	30.93	2nd
Concordia	Gunther Grosskamper	Grosskamper was a resident of Winnipeg. He challenged incumbent New Democratic Party leader Gary Doer. He died on March 28, 2019, at the age of 70. He operated GENGRO Business Consulting Services.	Winnipeg	Consulting Business operator	1,059	13.43	3rd
Crescentwood	Jim Carr	Carr previously served as the MLA for Fort Rouge, which was abolished prior to this election.			4,588	45.65	1st
Dauphin	Peter Rampton				1,608	16.35	3rd
Elmwood	Ed Price	Price stood as the Liberal candidate for Elmwood in the 1988 and 1990 elections. There was an independent candidate named Edward G. Price in Winnipeg—Birds Hill in the 1984 federal election. He was a business owner, and ran several advertisements in the Winnipeg Free Press, indicating his support for capital punishment, and his opposition to abortion, political patronage and deficit spending. He received 549 votes (1.05%), finishing sixth against New Democratic Party incumbent Bill Blaikie. It is not clear if this was the same person. The Liberal candidate in Rupertsland in the 1986 provincial election was also named Ed Price. He received 577 votes, finishing third against New Democratic Party incumbent Elijah Harper. It is not clear if this was the same person.			1,623	18.47	3rd
Emerson	Real Tetrault				1,739	23.75	2nd
Flin Flon	Pascall Bighetty				733	12.19	3rd
Fort Garry	Laurie Evans				3,992	36.81	2nd
Gimli	Darlene Skaritko				1,978	20.26	3rd
Gladstone	Cordell Barker				1,812	24.50	2nd
Inkster	Kevin Lamoureux				3,602	45.87	1st
Interlake	Duncan Edward Geisler				1,781	24.55	3rd
Kildonan	Claudia Sarbit				2,771	25.33	3rd
Kirkfield Park	Jasper McKee				3,430	33.29	2nd
Lac du Bonnet	Frank Thibedeau				1,309	13.62	3rd
Lakeside	Delmer Nott				1,936	25.87	2nd
La Verendrye	Claire Noel				2,718	32.41	2nd
Minnedosa	Terry Drebit				2,203	27.19	2nd
Morris	Bill Roth				2,036	24.20	2nd
Niakwa	Linda Asper				4,031	40.35	2nd
Osborne	Reg Alcock				3,941	40.21	1st
Pembina	Marilyn Skubovis				833	11.93	2nd
Point Douglas	Errol Lewis	Lewis (died October 28, 1998) was a Black Canadian activist in Manitoba, Canada. He served as President of the Manitoba Association of Rights and Liberties during the 1980s, and later worked with the Canadian Grain Commission as the assistant commissioner for Manitoba. He finished second against George Hickes of the NDP in the 1990 election, losing by over 1,000 votes.		Racial Justice Activist, Social rights Advocacy organization President	1,550	30.53	2nd
Portage la Prairie	Darlene Hamm				2,329	29.33	2nd
Radisson	Allan Patterson				1,925	22.20	3rd
Riel	Ed Benjamin				2,874	33.05	2nd
River East	Edna Mattson				1,960	20.76	3rd
River Heights	Sharon Carstairs	Carstairs served as leader of the Manitoba Liberal Party from 1984 and was the leader of the Official Opposition after the Liberals won the second most seats in the 1988 Manitoba general election.			5,467	47.97	1st
Roblin–Russell	Neil Stewart				1,757	20.93	3rd
Rossmere	Terry Duguid				2,416	26.27	3rd
Rupertsland	George Kernaghan				307	6.25	3rd
St. Boniface	Neil Gaudry				4,928	55.40	1st
St. James	Paul Edwards				3,014	35.09	1st
St. Johns	Mark Minenko				2,414	29.00	2nd
St. Norbert	John Angus				4,385	44.30	2nd
St. Vital	Bob Rose				3,243	35.02	2nd
Ste. Rose	Ivan Traill				1,882	26.63	2nd
Seine River	Herold Driedger				4,418	40.30	2nd
Selkirk	Gwen Charles				3,009	29.47	3rd
Springfield	Bob Strong				1,958	18.69	3rd
Steinbach	Cornelius Goertzen				1,171	15.99	2nd
Sturgeon Creek	Iva Yeo				3,907	38.86	2nd
Swan River	June Connolly-Payton				963	11.36	3rd
The Maples	Gulzar Singh Cheema	Cheema previously served as MLA for Kildonan from 1988 until 1990, and ran in the newly created district of The Maples.			3,273	39.83	1st
The Pas	David Merasty				1,005	13.15	3rd
Thompson	Don McIvor				698	10.25	3rd
Transcona	Richard Kozak				2,554	28.97	2nd
Turtle Mountain	Doug Collins				2,091	26.10	2nd
Tuxedo	Campbell Wright	Wright challenged Progressive Conservative leader Gary Filmon, the incumbent Premier of Manitoba.			3,281	27.19	2nd
Wellington	Ernie Gilroy				2,324	30.69	2nd
Wolseley	Harold Taylor				2,520	33.69	2nd

== By-elections ==
Riding	By-election Date	Candidate name	Notes	Residence	Occupation	Votes	%	Rank
Crescentwood	September 15, 1992	Avis Gray			Home Economist, Politician	2,702	33.94	1st
Portage la Prairie	September 15, 1992	Helen Christoffersen	Christoffersen had been a teacher for 26 years before contesting the by-election. She declined to give her age Vancouver Sun, 1 September 1992). She received 1,995 votes (31.88%), finishing second against Progressive Conservative candidate Brian Pallister. Christoffersen has been involved in environmental issues in the years since 1990. In a 2000 Maclean's survey, she defended the private use of lawn chemicals by homeowners while criticizing the indiscriminate use of such chemicals by cities and large corporations. In 2002, she participated in a report by the Manitoba Clean Environment Commission. In 1996, it was reported that Christoffersen was working as a teacher for a Hutterite community near Portage la Prairie (Winnipeg Free Press, 24 May 1996). She is still a resident of Portage la Prairie as of 2005.	Portage la Prairie	Teacher, Environmental activist	1,979	31.82	2nd
Osborne	September 21, 1993	Norma McCormick				2,966	43.10	1st
Rossmere	September 21, 1993	Sherry Wiebe				1,587	22.95	3rd
Rupertsland	September 21, 1993	George Munroe	Munroe was born and raised in Camperville, Manitoba, the child of a White Canadian father and a Saulteux mother. He has three years of experience in the Canadian Navy. Munroe is a veteran aboriginal activist in the province, who helped form the Manitoba Indian Brotherhood in 1967 and was executive director of the Indian-Métis Friendship Centre in the early 1970s. Munroe was elected to the Winnipeg City Council in 1971, winning as a New Democrat in the Ross House ward. When asked about his status as a community leader on election night, he was quoted as saying, "I believe I'll adhere to the old Indian concept where you have leaders for certain functions. I would not call myself a spokesman, but on certain issues, depending on the circumstances, I will speak for the native people. He first campaigned for the Manitoba legislature in the 1973 provincial election, as an independent candidate. Munroe served as vice-president of the Native Council of Canada in the 1970s, and unsuccessfully campaigned for its presidency in 1979. He was identified as serving as Chief of Garden Hill in a 1982 article (Globe and Mail, 7 January 1982), and was chief executive officer of the Sagkeeng First Nation in 1993 (Winnipeg Free Press, 16 August 1993). Munroe was 49 years old at the time of the by-election (WFP, 11 September 1993). He was director of the child and family services agency Ma Mawi Wi Chi Itata Centre in 1995, and supported efforts toward legal restitution for the victims of Canada's residential school system (WFP, 17 August 1995). He was also co-chairman of the Winnipeg Aboriginal Coalition, and promoted the creation of an aboriginal "trade zone" in the city to promote economic stimulation (WFP, 13 November 1995). In late 1996, he promoted a First Nations Bank of Canada (WFP, 12 December 1996). He was elected to a two-year term on the Aboriginal Council of Winnipeg in July 1996, and was later chosen as the council's vice-president (WFP, 28 July and 22 November 1996). He appears to have been re-elected in 1998, as he was still listed as council vice-president late in the year (WFP, 27 October 1998). Munroe was listed in 1999 as CEO of Neeginan Development Corp., which promotes aboriginal and historic tourism in Winnipeg (National Post, 24 May 1999). In 2001, he was a consultant with the Social Planning Council of Winnipeg (WFP, 27 June 2001). He served on the Winnipeg Project Advisory Council in 2003-04. He served as co-chair of the First Peoples National Party of Canada in 2005.		Veteran, Indigenous activist, Nonprofit Organization executive, Chief, Politician,	1,023	30.68	2nd
St. Johns	September 21, 1993	Naty Yankech				878	18.23	2nd
The Maples	September 21, 1993	Gary Kowalski			Police officer, School Trustee	3,619	50.84	1st
