= Prill (surname) =

Prill is a German surname. Notable people with the surname include:

- Alice Prill (born 1930), German actress
- David Prill (born 1959), American author
- Sondra Prill (born 1970), American cover singer

== See also ==
- Prell (surname)
