= First Peoples Party =

Former Canadian political party

The First Peoples Party (FPP) was a short-lived political-party in Manitoba, Canada.

== History ==
The FPP was created following a 1993 resolution by the Assembly of Manitoba Chiefs, endorsing a political party to focus on aboriginal issues. The party was officially founded in November 1994, and fielded three candidates in the 1995 provincial election. The FPP was not registered with Elections Manitoba, and its candidates appeared on the ballot as independents.

The FPP argued that all aboriginal peoples in Canada possess an inherent right to self-government, and claimed the established political parties were not giving sufficient attention to aboriginal concerns.

The party also highlighted issues of sustainable development and the environment. Jerry Fontaine was recognized as the party's leader, although it is not clear if he held an official title within the party. A former Liberal Party candidate, Fontaine emphasized that the FPP was open to all Manitobans and not only those of aboriginal background.

Some members of Manitoba's aboriginal community opposed the FPP's creation. George Hickes, a New Democratic Party (NDP) legislator of Inuit background, argued that the principle of an aboriginal party is inappropriate for Canada's constituency-based electoral system. Elected politicians, he argued, are required to represent diverse communities. Referring to his own ethnically diverse Point Douglas constituency, Hickes said, "You have Ukrainians, Filipinos, Chinese. What happens to them... if you're running to represent only one group of people?"

The FPP was largely unsuccessful as a political party. Fontaine ran a credible campaign in the vast northern constituency of Rupertsland, but nonetheless finished in fourth place with 541 votes. Una Truscott received 262 votes in the Winnipeg constituency of Broadway, while Lyle Morrisseau received 105 votes in neighbouring Point Douglas. The NDP won all three constituencies.

In the middle of the campaign, two candidates from a separate party called Independent Native Voice also joined the FPP: Nelson Contois and his daughter Carey Contois. Three years later, allegations arose that the Contois candidacies were sponsored by Progressive Conservative Party organizers to encourage vote-splitting with the NDP. The FPP was not implicated in this scandal.

The First Peoples Party dissolved after the 1995 election. Fontaine subsequently rejoined the Liberals, and ran for the leadership of that party in 1998. He was defeated by Jon Gerrard.

In 2000, a separate First Peoples Party was founded in British Columbia under the leadership of Don Moss. This was later renamed as the All Nations Party of British Columbia. A federal First Peoples National Party of Canada was established in 2005, based in part on the FPP.

== Election results ==
Election	# of candidates nominated	# of seats won	# of total votes	% of popular vote	% in seats contested
1995	3	0	908		5.72

If the Contois candidacies are included, the figures become:

Election	# of candidates nominated	# of seats won	# of total votes	% of popular vote	% in seats contested
1995	5	0	1,137		3.32

== FPP candidates ==
=== Una Truscott (Broadway) ===
Truscott was the first candidate nominated for the FPP. She was a 28-year-old university student at the time of the election, and her campaign focused on sustainable development and the environment. She received 262 votes (4.01%), finishing fourth in a field of four candidates. The winner was Conrad Santos of the New Democratic Party.

Truscott later worked as the Aboriginal Public Administration Program Intern for the Office of the Children's Advocate of Manitoba, and became the Aboriginal Cultural and Spiritual Liaison at the St. Amant Centre.

=== Lyle Morrisseau (Point Douglas) ===
Morrisseau is a member of the Sagkeeng First Nation, and also holds the name Kah Kimi Watha Pimi Whata (Day Walker). He served on the student council of the Saskatchewan Indian Federated College in the early 1990s. In January 1994, he was a spokesman for the 1992 Committee Supporting 500 Years of Indigenous Resistance at an anti-North American Free Trade Agreement (NAFTA) rally in Winnipeg. Morrisseau endorsed the actions of indigenous rebels in the Mexican state of Chiapas, and drew parallels between the conditions of aboriginal people in Mexico, Canada and the United States.

He received 105 votes (2.14%) in the 1995 election, finishing fourth against New Democratic Party candidate George Hickes. Soon after the election, Morrisseau participated in a protest by the Nuxalk nation in British Columbia against local logging activities as a representative of the First Nations Environmental Network.

Morrisseau remained active with environmental issues after 1995. In 1997, he spoke out against the burial of nuclear waste on aboriginal land.

In 2000, Morrisseau and Royal Canadian Mounted Police (RCMP) officer Ron MacRae used CPR to revive a trucker whom witnessed initially believed was dead at the scene of an accident. The newspaper report of this incident listed Morrisseau as living in Fort Alexander, Manitoba.

=== Jerry Fontaine (Rupertsland) ===
Fontaine received 541 votes (12.22%), finishing fourth against NDP candidate Eric Robinson.

== Footnotes ==
All electoral information is taken from Elections Manitoba.

== See also ==
- List of political parties in Canada
