= Progressive Conservative Party of Manitoba candidates in the 1990 Manitoba provincial election =

The Progressive Conservative Party of Manitoba won a majority government in the 1990 provincial election. Many of the party's candidates have their own biography pages; information about others may be found here.

== Burrows: Chris Aune ==
Aune received 1,478 votes (19.10%), finishing third against New Democratic Party candidate Doug Martindale.

== Concordia: Victor Rubiletz ==
Rubiletz was an autobody repair technician for thirty years before suffering a workplace injury. He subsequently took high school upgrading courses, and entered a career in journalism. He has also been a spokesman for Royal Canadian Legions in Manitoba. He has campaigned for the Progressive Conservative Party on two occasions.

Electoral record
Election	Division	Party	Votes	%	Place	Winner
1988 provincial	Concordia	Progressive Conservative	2,634	26.83	3/5	Gary Doer, New Democratic Party
1990 provincial	Concordia	Progressive Conservative	1,937	24.56	2/5	Gary Doer, New Democratic Party

== Osborne: Sondra Braid ==
Braid (March 8, 1964—November 15, 2004) was a lawyer and teacher. She was born in Winnipeg, and held a Bachelor of Arts degree from the University of Manitoba and a Bachelor of Laws from the University of Western Ontario. She was called to the Manitoba bar in 1988, and worked for the firm of Newman, MacLean and Associates and later Wilder, Wilder and Langtry. She received 2,859 votes (29.17%) in 1990, finishing third against Liberal incumbent Reg Alcock.

She moved to Brainerd, Minnesota after her marriage, and worked as a county court administrator. She then moved to Texas in 1996, and received a teaching certificate from Southwest Texas State University in 1999. She moved to South Korea in 2004 to teach English as a Second Language, but died of pneumonia related complications later in the year. Her obituary was printed by the Winnipeg Free Press on November 25, 2004, and is available online here.

== Point Douglas: Calvin Pompana ==
Pompana is an aboriginal activist in Manitoba, Canada. He is an elder in the Dakota tribe from the Sioux Valley River first nation, and has been involved in several aboriginal outreach efforts in Manitoba. During the 1980s, he served as president of the Urban Indian Association (Winnipeg Free Press, 29 August 1990).

As of 2005, Pompana assists aboriginal youth in Winnipeg with job-training, in conjunction with the Urban Indian Association of Winnipeg and AMC Research and Policy Development. A former student in Canada's residential school system, he has provided assistance to other former students who were victimized in the system. Pompana is also an artist, and has worked in cultural activities such as storytelling, singing and dancing in native communities.

He campaigned in the north-end Winnipeg riding of Point Douglas, which has a large aboriginal population, and finished third with 575 votes. The winner, George Hickes of the NDP, was also aboriginal.

== Radisson: Mike Thompson ==
Thompson was listed as a schoolteacher. He previously ran for the House of Commons of Canada in the 1988 federal election, at age 35.

Electoral record
Election	Division	Party	Votes	%	Place	Winner
1988 federal	Winnipeg—Transcona	Progressive Conservative	10,815	25.62	3/6	Bill Blaikie, New Democratic Party
1990 provincial	Radisson	Progressive Conservative	2,692		3/3	Marianne Cerilli, New Democratic Party

== Transcona: Ray Hargreaves ==
Hargreaves had previously campaigned as an independent candidate in the 1988 provincial election, and had sought election to the Winnipeg City Council.

Electoral record
Election	Division	Party	Votes	%	Place	Winner
1988 provincial	Transcona	Independent	121		4/4	Richard Kozak, Liberal
1989 municipal	Winnipeg City Council, Transcona Ward	n/a	60		6/6	Rick Boychuk
1990 provincial	Transcona	Progressive Conservative	1,732	19.64	3/4	Daryl Reid, New Democratic Party

Note: The 1989 municipal results are based on incomplete totals taken from the Winnipeg Free Press newspaper, with 57 out of 59 polls reporting. The final results were not significantly different.

== Wellington: Clyde Perry ==
Clyde Perry is a former principal at Winnipeg's Tec Voc High School. He started the WIT Basketball Tournament in 1975, to provide competition for local and out-of-town teams. He received 1,534 votes (20.26%) in 1990, finishing third against New Democratic Party candidate Becky Barrett.
