= Julia Richman Education Complex =

Public school in New York City

Coordinates: 40.76538°N 73.9598°W

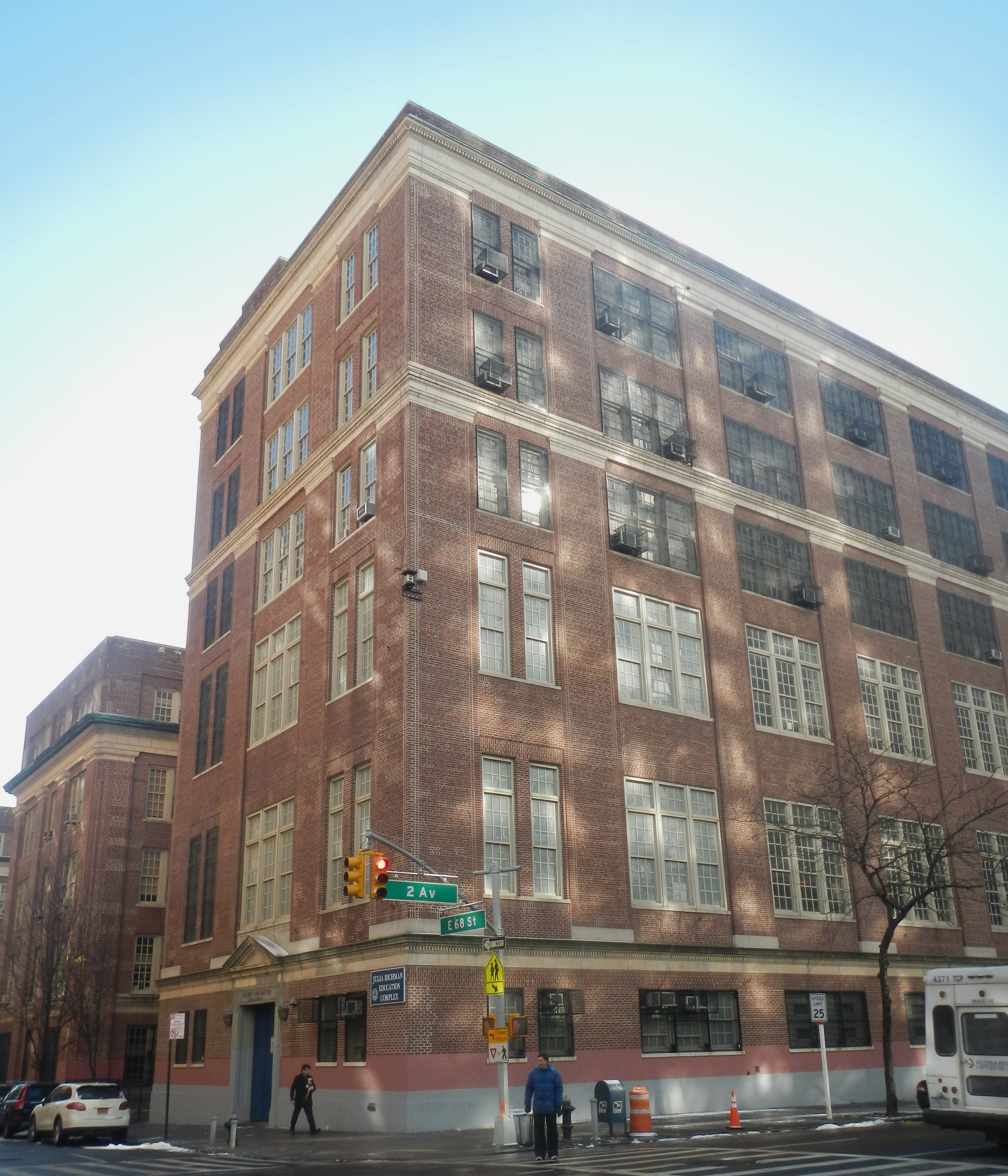
The complex at 68th Street and Second Avenue

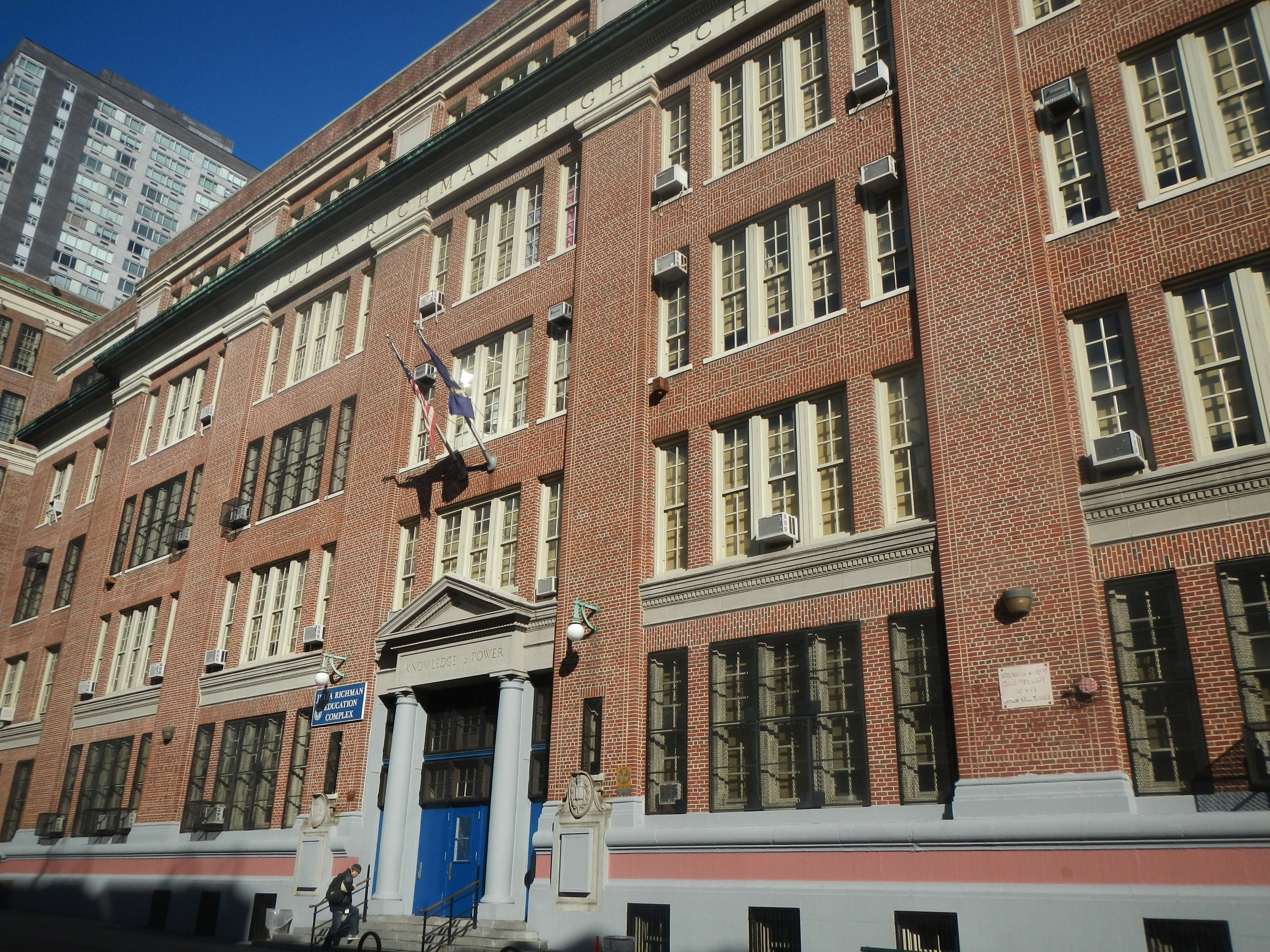
67th Street facade

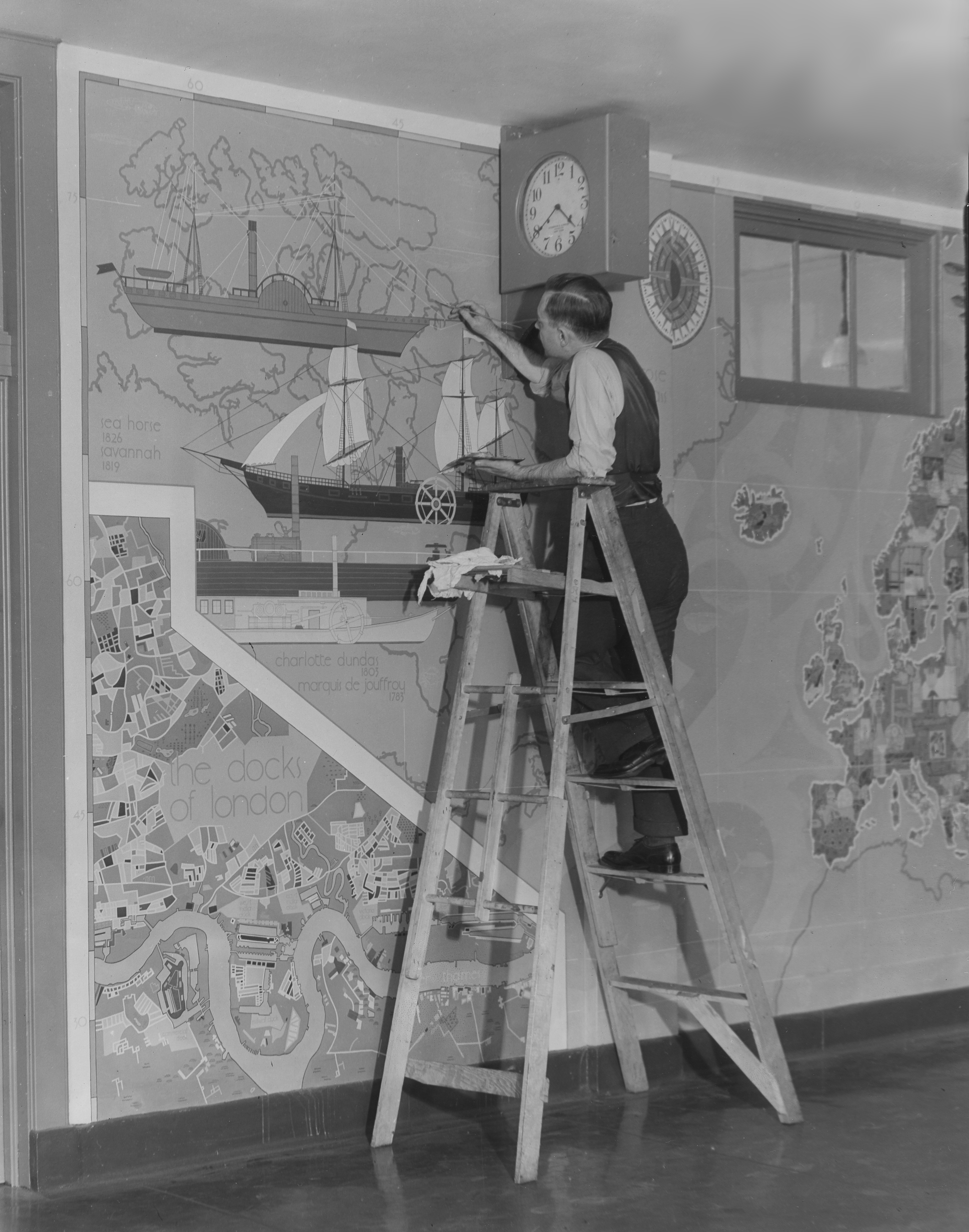
Artist Benjamin Knotts painting a mural at the school as part of the Federal Art Project in 1936. From the collection of the Archives of American Art

The Julia Richman Education Complex (JREC) is an educational multiplex located on the Upper East Side of Manhattan, New York City. Named after the district superintendent of schools, Julia Richman, it houses six autonomous small schools for approximately 1,800 Pre-K through 12th grade students in the former building of Julia Richman High School, a comprehensive high school that operated until 1995. The schools are operated by the New York City Department of Education.

== History ==
=== All-girls high school, 1913-1967 ===
Julia Richman High School was founded in 1913 as an all-girls commercial high school at 60 West 13th Street in Greenwich Village. It was named after Julia Richman, the first woman district superintendent of schools in New York City. The school expanded, eventually operating in seven buildings across New York City. Construction started on the present building in 1922 and the new building was dedicated two years later. In the 1930s, the school had rigorous classes and a dress code.

=== Co-educational high school, 1967-1995 ===
JRHS changed to co-educational in 1967.

By 1990 the NYC Board of Education identified JRHS as having the worst statistics of student achievement in Manhattan. The local police precinct referred to the crime-infested school as “Julia Rikers,” known for its violence and vandalism. Metal detectors were installed and metal cages were used to isolate students with disciplinary problems. Only thirty-seven percent of its enrollees graduated.

=== Small schools, 1995-present ===
The school closed to entering freshmen in 1993 who were given the opportunity to attend one of six new small schools located outside the school building. With money provided in part by the entities such as the Bill and Melinda Gates Foundation, the building was redesigned from a single school into a multi-age, multi-service learning community with six autonomous, public, Small Schools. The new schools that formed the new Julia Richman Education Complex were "hothoused" in temporary buildings elsewhere. The $30 million renovation in 1993–95 restored the exterior of the building, provided separate spaces for each of the small schools, yet maintained many of the traditional features of the building. It opened its doors to four new schools in 1995. In 1996 the last class of the former JRHS, which had stayed in the building throughout the restructuring, graduated.

==== Performance ====
Prior to its closing, Julia Richman High School had developed a reputation for academic failure with a graduation rate of 35%. Within a decade the new smaller schools claimed a low staff turnover and an average high school graduation rate in excess of 85%, more than 5% greater than the city-wide graduation rate. The school has been visited by educators and school designers from around the world to see what the then education director of the Gates Foundation has called the JREC "the best example in the United States of a multiplex of a group of very effective schools that share a common facility. And it’s a group of schools that are showing really outstanding results.”

=== Proposed relocation in 2006 ===
In 2006, the nearby Hunter College of the City University of New York proposed to take over the complex and relocate the schools to a new facility on the college's Brookdale campus approximately 40 blocks south in the Kips Bay neighborhood. Public opposition was widespread and included Governor David Paterson, city council member Jessica Lappin, and State Senator Liz Krueger. Lappin and Kreuger said that "a preference by one CUNY school for expansion convenient to its existing campus is simply not a sufficient rationale" to "uproot six outstanding public schools." Hunter College sought to build a science tower on the site of the Julia Richman campus. In 2008, Manhattan Community Board 8, which represents the Upper East Side, voted for a resolution opposing the plan.

== The schools ==
The six schools are autonomous, each with its own budget, teachers, schedules, curriculum, and separate spaces within the facility. Each maintains its own identity.

=== Urban Academy High School M565 ===
Urban Academy is an inquiry-based, college oriented high school with a rigorous academic focus. The school serves approximately 169 students (as of 2012) in grades 9–12. Many students also take college courses at Hunter College or at Eugene Lang College at New School University where they receive course credit. Urban Academy is a member of the Coalition of Essential Schools and requires students to successfully complete six core proficiencies to graduate (Creative Arts, Criticism, Literature, Math, Science, and Social Studies). The school uses non-traditional approaches to education: teachers and students call one another by their first names, food and drink are brought into class, and teachers have opposed government-mandated testing claiming it is "a distraction from more creative pursuits".

=== Vanguard High School M449 ===
Vanguard is a college preparatory school grades 9-12 for students from all boroughs of New York City. The school serves approximately 450 students and is divided into Upper (11-12)and Lower Schools (9-10). Curricula are planned using the Habits of Mind.

The school's curriculum encourages empathy and respect for others through investigation of different viewpoints and making connections with their own lives. As a member of the New York State Performance Standards Consortium, in order to graduate Vanguard students demonstrate mastery in Literature, History, Math and Science by presenting original analysis, research, and mathematical models to faculty committees and must take one NY State Regents exam in English.

=== Talent Unlimited High School M519 ===
Talent Unlimited is a small school for the performing arts. The school serves approximately 484 students (as of 2012) in grades 9–12. It offers highly specialized courses in vocal and instrumental music, musical theatre, drama, and dance.

=== P226M Junior High Annex ===
P226M is school for children with autism. The school is a cluster school with in seven facilities, including the JREC, and (as of 2012) serves a total of approximately 300 middle school and high school inclusion students in grades 9–12.

=== The Ella Baker School M255 ===
Ella Baker School is a pre-K through 8th grade school serving approximately 317 students (as of 2012). It is named after the African-American civil rights and human rights activist Ella Josephine Baker. This school was founded 1996 by former teachers and administrators from Central Park East Elementary School.

=== Manhattan International High School M459 ===
Manhattan International is a high school for recent immigrants with a focus on students whose first language is not English. It serves approximately 309 students (as of 2009) in grades 9–12. The school is a member of the New York Performance Standards Consortium, which opposes high-stakes "one size does not fit all" tests.

== The complex ==
In addition to the six separate schools, the JREC includes facilities offering services to them all:

- LYFE, a toddler center serving children of teen parents
- the Mount Sinai Student Health Clinic
- the Inquiry Center for Teaching and Learning
- the Maxine Greene Center for the Arts

The schools also share an art gallery, auditorium, cafeteria, ceramics studio, culinary arts room, dance studio, gymnasiums, library, swimming pool, and a mini-theater. The complex is governed by the Building Council composed of directors and principals from each school and program within the building. The council, chaired by the Building Manager who is a principal from one of the six schools, meets regularly and determines policy for the entire complex within six fundamental goals: multiage communities, autonomous schools, dedicated school space, shared services, and common spaces and governance.

== Notable alumni ==
Notable alumni of Julia Richman High School have included:

- Fay Ajzenberg-Selove, German-American physicist
- Lauren Bacall, film and stage actress and model
- Cathy Berberian, soprano and composer
- Big L, rapper
- Carmen Contreras-Bozak, first Hispanic to serve in the U.S. Women's Army Corps
- Geraldine Brooks, actress
- Franklin Edwards, NBA player, 1982-83 NBA World Champion
- Jade Trini Goring, contemporary gospel music singer
- Patricia Highsmith, novelist and short story writer
- Judy Holliday, actress
- Sondra Lipton, model and painter
- Lisa Lisa (born Lisa Velez), musician
- Gene Anthony Ray, actor, dancer, and choreographer
- Philip Anthony Rodriguez, actor
- Sue Simmons, TV journalist and broadcaster
- Hessy Levinsons Taft, chemistry teacher; as a Jewish child, her photo was featured in Nazi Germany as the "Perfect Aryan Baby"
- Cynthia Toohey, Alaska state legislator
- Samuel E Vázquez, visual artist
- Fredi Washington, actress, civil rights activist, and writer
