= George Hickes (Manitoba politician) =

Canadian politician (born 1946)

28th Speaker of the Legislative Assembly of Manitoba
- In office November 18, 1999 – October 20, 2011
- Preceded by: Louise Dacquay
- Succeeded by: Daryl Reid

Member of the Legislative Assembly of Manitoba for Point Douglas
- In office September 11, 1990 – October 4, 2011
- Preceded by: None
- Succeeded by: Kevin Chief

Personal details
- Born: 26 June 1946 (age 80) Ports Point, Northwest Territories, Canada
- Party: NDP

George Hickes (born 26 June 1946) is a politician in Manitoba, Canada. He has served in the Legislative Assembly of Manitoba from 1990 until 2011, and was the Speaker of the Assembly from November 1999 to October 2011. He is a member of the New Democratic Party.

Hickes is the father of Nunavut politician George Hickes Jr., and the uncle of Nunavut politician Hunter Tootoo and hockey player Jordin Tootoo.

== Early life and career ==
Hickes was born to an Inuit family near Ports Point in the Northwest Territories (now Nunavut), and was raised in Churchill, Manitoba. His early years alternated between traditional Inuit life and modern Canadian society. He caught beluga whales in his youth (a long-standing tradition in Inuit culture), and earned the nickname "coldwater cowboy" for working without the aid of nets. The descendants of whales caught by Hickes can still be seen in several aquariums throughout the world.

Hickes worked as a heavy equipment operator at the Tar Sands Project in Fort McMurray, Alberta in the early 1970s, and held a variety of jobs in Churchill during the same period. He joined Manitoba's New Careers program in 1976, and later acknowledged that this decision saved him from a life of poverty. After graduating in 1978, Hickes became a trainer and coordinator for New Careers in Winnipeg until 1984. He later worked as executive director of the Limestone Training and Employment Agency near Gillam, Manitoba, and assisted in designing an education program for the Yukon.

== Provincial politics ==
=== Opposition member ===
Hickes planned to challenge Elijah Harper for the NDP nomination in Rupertsland before the 1990 provincial election, but withdrew when Harper attained national prominence for blocking the Meech Lake Accord. He was instead elected for the north-end Winnipeg constituency of Point Douglas, which has a large aboriginal community. He has been returned in every election since then, and received almost 75% support in the 2003 election.

The NDP formed the Official Opposition in the Manitoba legislature from 1990 to 1999, and Hickes served as his party's whip in this period. He played a prominent role in having November 8 designated as a day to recognize Manitoba's aboriginal veterans, and successfully called for legislation requiring that cooking liqueurs sold in the province have no more than 25% alcohol content. The latter measure followed a series of deaths in Winnipeg involving Chinese cooking wine with a higher alcohol content. Hickes supported Lorne Nystrom's bid to lead the federal New Democratic Party in 1995.

He spoke against plans to create an aboriginal political party in 1994, arguing that such a party could not effectively represent multicultural communities. Referring to his own Point Douglas riding, he said, "You have Ukrainians, Filipinos, Chinese. What happens to them . . . if you're running to represent only one group of people?"

Manitoba's electoral boundaries were redistributed in 1999. Hickes was challenged for the Point Douglas NDP nomination by fellow legislator Conrad Santos, whose Broadway constituency had been eliminated. He won the challenge, and Santos subsequently ran and was elected in the new division of Wellington.

=== Speaker ===
The NDP won a majority government in the 1999 election, and Hickes defeated Santos, Denis Rocan and Marcel Laurendeau in a free vote of the assembly to become its new speaker. He was the first speaker to be chosen in this manner, previous speakers having been appointed by the premier. He was re-elected speaker in 2003. Hickes was re-elected to the Manitoba legislature in the 2007 provincial election. Shortly after, he was re-elected as speaker without opposition. Opposition party leaders Hugh McFadyen and Jon Gerrard both indicated that they regarded Hickes as fair and even-handed.

On February 10, 2011, Hickes announced that he would not seek re-election in the next provincial election.

== Electoral record ==
2007 Manitoba general election: Point Douglas
Party	Candidate	Votes	%	±%	Expenditures
New Democratic	George Hickes	2,665	66.36	−8.50	$12,892.59
Liberal	Mary Lou Bourgeois	591	14.72	+0.48	$11,443.44
Progressive Conservative	Alexa Rosentreter	481	11.98	+3.21	$1,180.30
Green	Kristen Andrews	213	5.30	–	$84.55
Communist	Darrell Rankin	66	1.64	−0.49	$373.89
Total valid votes		4,016	100.00		
Rejected and declined ballots		29	0.72	-0.69	
Turnout		4,045	40.14	−0.10	
Electors on the lists		10,077			
New Democratic hold		Swing		-4.49	

2003 Manitoba general election: Point Douglas
Party	Candidate	Votes	%	±%	Expenditures
New Democratic	George Hickes	2,877	74.86	+21.52	$10,189.54
Liberal	Mary Lou Bourgeois	547	14.23	−7.12	$7,991.06
Progressive Conservative	Wyatt McIntyre	337	8.77	−10.79	$10.68
Communist	Darrell Rankin	82	2.13		$376.06
Total valid votes		3,843	100.00		
Rejected and declined ballots		55	1.41	+0.48	
Turnout		3,898	40.24	−18.84	
Electors on the lists		9,687			
New Democratic hold		Swing		+14.32	

1999 Manitoba general election: Point Douglas
Party	Candidate	Votes	%	±%	Expenditures
New Democratic	George Hickes	3,338	53.34	-9.69	$21,952.00
Liberal	Ajay Chopra	1,336	21.35	-1.71	$21,013.00
Progressive Conservative	Mary Richard	1,224	19.56	+7.79	$20,221.11
Independent	Peter Juba	360	5.75		$2,113.33
Total valid votes		6,258	100.00		
Rejected and declined ballots		59	0.93	-0.17	
Turnout		6,317	59.08	0.85	
Electors on the lists		10,693			
New Democratic hold		Swing		+3.99	

1995 Manitoba general election: Point Douglas
Party	Candidate	Votes	%	±%	Expenditures
New Democratic	George Hickes	3,095	63.03	+8.32	$15,378.00
Liberal	Linda Cantiveros	1,132	23.05	-7.47	$15,916.74
Progressive Conservative	Claire Riddle	578	11.77	+0.45	$13,389.05
First Peoples Party	Lyle Morrisseau	105	2.14		no report filed
Total valid votes		4,910	100.00		
Rejected and discarded ballots		55	1.11	-0.27	
Turnout		4,965	58.23	-2.70	
Electors on lists		8,527			
New Democratic hold		Swing		+7.90	

1990 Manitoba general election: Point Douglas
Party	Candidate	Votes	%	±%
New Democratic	George Hickes	2,778	54.72	
Liberal	Errol Lewis	1,550	30.53	
Progressive Conservative	Calvin Pompana	575	11.33	
Independent	William Hawryluk	108	2.13	
Independent	Roy Price	66	1.30	
Total valid votes		5,077	100.00	
Rejected ballots		71	1.38	
Turnout		5,148	60.92	
Electors on lists		8,450		

All electoral information is taken from Elections Manitoba. Expenditure entries refer to individual candidate expenses.

== Footnotes ==
Political offices
Preceded by Louise Dacquay	Speaker of the Legislative Assembly of Manitoba; November 18, 1999 – October 20, 2011	Succeeded by Daryl Reid
Legislative Assembly of Manitoba
Preceded by Riding created	Member of the Legislative Assembly for Point Douglas; September 11, 1990 – October 3, 2011	Succeeded by Kevin Chief
