= Prell (surname) =

Prell is a surname. Notable people with the surname include:

- Allan Prell (1937–2016), American talk radio host
- Bally Prell (1922–1982), German performer, humorous singer, and folk singer
- Donald Prell (1924–2020), American World War II veteran, venture capitalist and futurist
- Heinrich Prell (1888–1962), German zoologist
- Hermann Prell (1854–1922), German history painter, sculptor and professor
- Karen Prell (born 1959), American puppeteer and animator
- Milton Prell (1905–1974), American hotel owner and developer

== See also ==
- Prill (surname)
