= Jerry Fontaine =

Canadian politician

Jerry Fontaine is an Anishinaabe politician in Manitoba, Canada. He was chief of the Sagkeeng First Nation from 1989 to 1998, led the First Peoples Party in the 1995 provincial election, and was an unsuccessful candidate to lead the Manitoba Liberal Party in 1998. He was the director of Indigenous Initiatives at Algoma University from 2004-2008.

Fontaine is the nephew of Assembly of First Nations leader Phil Fontaine.

== Early career ==
Fontaine received a Bachelor of Arts degree from the University of Manitoba in 1976. He first campaigned for the Legislative Assembly of Manitoba in the 1986 provincial election, contesting Lac du Bonnet as a Liberal. The Liberal Party was a weak electoral force in Manitoba during this period, and Fontaine received 959 votes (11.33%). The winner was Clarence Baker of the New Democratic Party.

== Sagkeeng chief and FPP leader ==
Fontaine became chief of the Sagkeeng First Nation three years later, and led the community until 1998. During his tenure as Chief, Sagkeeng developed the First Nation's constitutional declaration. This declaration facilitated the Manitoba Hydro Accord, a process that enabled the community to mitigate erosion damages caused by Hydro development and enforce its jurisdiction over its traditional territory. The constitutional process mandated the First Nation's Law-Making Assembly to pass two important pieces of legislation in relation to the Hydro Accord: the Process Law and Conservation Law. He was a supporter of local gambling rights, and launched a private prosecution against the Pine Falls pulp mill in 1995 for violations of the Water Rights Act. By his own admission, he destroyed his Liberal Party membership in 1994 when the Canadian government of Jean Chrétien relaxed anti-pollution standards in the area near his community. Fontaine became a prominent spokesman for Manitoba's First Peoples Party (FPP) later in the year and was generally recognized as the nascent party's leader, although it is not clear if he held an official position.

The FPP was created following a 1993 resolution of the Assembly of Manitoba chiefs that advocated a political party focused on aboriginal issues. The party argued that all native peoples in Canada have an inherent right to self-government and that the country's traditional political parties were not addressing aboriginal concerns. Fontaine emphasized that the FPP was open to all Manitobans, not simply those of aboriginal background.

The party ran three candidates in the 1995 provincial election, all of whom were defeated. Fontaine ran a credible campaign in the vast northern constituency of Rupertsland, but received only 541 votes (12.22%) for a fourth-place finish against New Democrat Eric Robinson, who is also aboriginal. The FPP ceased to exist after the election.

In 1998, an investigation by the Canadian Broadcasting Corporation raised allegations that a separate aboriginal-issues party called Independent Native Voice (INV) had been set up by Progressive Conservative organizers to take votes from the New Democratic Party in marginal constituencies. A commission led by Judge Alfred Monnin ruled that these organizers had induced at least one candidate, Darryl Sutherland, to run. The FPP was not implicated in this scandal. In the year the scandal broke, Fontaine informed the media that Sutherland had approached him late in the 1995 campaign to acknowledge that Conservative organizers provided him with funds. He encouraged Sutherland to take his story to the press, although Sutherland rejected this advice at the time. Fontaine has asserted that "the Tories took advantage of Aboriginal individuals who weren't all that involved in political issues or political life", and argued that the incident was symptomatic of the way aboriginal voters are sometimes treated by mainstream parties.

== Liberal leadership campaign ==
Fontaine rejoined the Manitoba Liberal Party after the FPP's dissolution, and became a candidate for the party's leadership in 1998 following the resignation of Ginny Hasselfield. He was 42 years old at the time. His candidacy was organized by Ernie Gilroy, and won support from figures such as Terry Duguid and Graham Dixon. Fontaine emphasized that he was not a protest candidate, and his campaign did not focus exclusively on aboriginal issues. Initially regarded as the frontrunner, he lost to former Member of Parliament Jon Gerrard by 1336 votes to 832 in a mail-in ballot open to all party members. He was not a candidate in the 1999 provincial election.

== Wing Construction ==
During the 1998 leadership contest, Fontaine was served with a $100,000 lawsuit from Wing Construction Limited, which had previously received a contract for school construction in Sagkeeng. Wing Construction argued that the Sagkeeng council had not turned over promised funds, and asserted that the company was left to sustain a loss of three million dollars. The federal government later determined that the Wing contract had not been formally approved by the Department of Indian Affairs, and the company was forced into bankruptcy protection in 2000. Fontaine characterized the personal lawsuit as "frivolous", and was later described as saying that the company had overstated the value of its work. Others have disputed this, and Alan Isfeld of the Waywayseecappo First Nation argued that the collapse of Wing Construction created a potentially destructive precedent for aboriginal/non-aboriginal partnerships in Canada.

Separate from the Wing Construction controversy, some members of the Sagkeeng first nation accused Fontaine of inadequate on-reserve housing in 1998. He resigned as chief following a series of protests, saying that he needed to devote all of his attention to the leadership contest. He later defended his financial record against what he described as a "continued siege by government and media alike".

== Since 1998 ==
From 1998-2003, Fontaine served as Senior Advisor to the Pine Falls Paper Company. During this period, he facilitated negotiations between the Pine Falls Paper Company (PFPC) and participating Anishinaabe Nations in the development of a partnership agreement between the PFPC and the Anishinabe Nations.

During the period 2003-2005, Fontaine became active in the development of the Treaty 1 Protection Office that included the following Treaty 1 First Nations (Brokenhead, Long Plain, Peguis, Roseau River, Sagkeeng, Sandy Bay and Swan Lake). Treaty 1 was signed on August 3, 1871.

In 2005, Fontaine served as an adviser to AFN leader Phil Fontaine and promoted education within Canada's aboriginal communities. He has argued that Aboriginal communities should have control over First Nations post-secondary institutions.

He was chosen as interim president of the First Peoples National Party of Canada, a federal party similar to the FPP, in 2005. He continues to serve as FPNP president as of 2006. Fontaine was an administrator at Algoma University, where he worked as Director of Indigenous Initiatives.

While in the capacity of Director of Indigenous Initiatives, Fontaine also served as Sessional Lecturer. (Algoma University, Laurentian University and Shingwauk Kinoomaage Gamig)

Fontaine received a Master of Business Administration (MBA) from (European University, Paris, France) (2000), Master of Arts (MA) from the (University of Manitoba) (2009) and Ph.D. in Indigenous Studies (Trent University, Peterborough, Ontario).

He published Our Hearts Are as One Fire through UBC Press in 2020, which focused on the leadership of Pontiac (1763), Tecumseh (1812) and Shingwauk (1812 & 1850) and the Three Fires Confederacy. A second book, Di-bayn-di-zi-win (To Own Ourselves): Embodying Objibway-Anishinabe Ways" co-authored with Don McCaskill was published by Dundurn Press in 2022 and focused on Indigenous self-determination and Indigenization of the academy.

== Electoral record ==
1995 Manitoba general election: Rupertsland
Party	Candidate	Votes	%	±%	Expenditures
New Democratic	Eric Robinson	2,249	50.80	1.37	$22,077.00
Liberal	Harry Wood	1,018	23.00	-7.69	$25,182.52
Progressive Conservative	Eric Kennedy	619	13.98	-5.90	$8,427.91
First Peoples Party	Jerry Fontaine	541	12.22	–	$14,852.48
Total valid votes		4,427	–	–	
Rejected		22	–		
Eligible voters / turnout		9,924	44.83	–	
Source(s) Source: Manitoba. Chief Electoral Officer (1999). Statement of Votes for the 37th Provincial General Election, September 21, 1999 (PDF) (Report). Winnipeg: Elections Manitoba.

1986 Manitoba general election: Lac du Bonnet
Party	Candidate	Votes	%	±%
New Democratic	Clarence Baker	3,903	46.12	-16.38
Progressive Conservative	Darren Praznik	3,601	42.55	5.05
Liberal	Jerry Fontaine	959	11.33	–
Total valid votes		8,463	–	–
Rejected		17	–	
Eligible voters / Turnout		11,469	73.94	3.61
New Democratic hold		Swing		
Source(s) Source: Manitoba. Chief Electoral Officer (1999). Statement of Votes for the 37th Provincial General Election, September 21, 1999 (PDF) (Report). Winnipeg: Elections Manitoba.

All electoral information is taken from Elections Manitoba. Expenditure entries refer to individual candidate expenses. Fontaine was elected Chief of the Sagkeeng First Nation in 1989, 1991, 1993, 1995 and 1997.

== Footnotes ==
All electoral information is taken from Elections Manitoba. Expenditures refer to individual candidate expenses.

Preceded by Ken Courchene	Chief of the Sagkeeng First Nation; 1989-1998	Succeeded by Ron Fontaine
