= Ken Courchene =

Ken Courchene is a former Chief of the Fort Alexander Indian Band in the Canadian province of Manitoba. He has been sued by the federal government for his alleged role in the Virginia Fontaine Memorial Treatment Centre controversy.

== Political career ==
Courchene was Chief of the Fort Alexander Indian Band during the 1980s. The community's name was later changed to the Sagkeeng First Nation.

In 1984, Courchene and the Sagkeeng Band Council refused an order from the Canada Labour Relations Board to reinstate four teachers who were fired for engaging in union activities. Justice Paul Rouleau of the Federal Court of Canada found Courchene and the other councillors in contempt of court for their decision, remarking that he had seldom seen such brazen contempt for authority. The band council was fined $15,000, and Courchene was fined $5,000. Newspaper accounts do not indicate if the sentence was appealed.

Courchene served as acting chairman of the First Nations Confederacy in 1987. He welcomed a report from the Coopers & Lybrand Consulting Group, which found that federal Indian Affairs officials deliberately ignored regulations for expenditure controls in Manitoba.

The Department of Indian Affairs took over Fort Alexander's programs and finances later in the same year, arguing that the band was at least $1.2 million in debt. Courchene had previously rejected a plan to devolve oversight powers to a committee with federal and band representatives.

In 1989, Courchene argued that the Royal Canadian Mounted Police spent too much time patrolling his territory. A local RCMP official denied that his department was profiling Fort Alexander residents, and said that officers generally entered the reserve in response to calls for assistance. Courchene was succeeded as chief by Jerry Fontaine later in the same year.

== Virginia Fontaine Memorial Treatment Centre Controversy ==
After standing down as chief, Courchene became chief operating officer of the Virginia Fontaine Memorial Treatment Centre in Sagkeeng. The centre was the subject of a federal audit in 1995, which uncovered nearly $1.2 million in "unsupported per diem billings," $1.3 million in "questionable expenditures" and $200,000 in "travel expenses not supported with original receipts." Courchene said that the audit was "born in a series of lies" by Indian Affairs officials trying to assert control over the band's finances.

In October 2000, the Canadian media reported allegations that centre directors, staff members and their spouses had taken a week-long Caribbean cruise with money from their professional development budget. The federal government donated $7.2 million per year to the centre at the time, and there were concerns that federal funds had been used for the vacation. Courchene said that employees raised the money privately, and that it was not part of the general operating budget. He later said that the money was raised through charity bingos. Notwithstanding his comments, the federal government ordered a forensic audit into the centre's budget in the same month as the controversy broke. Other allegations of improper spending were reported in the following weeks, and some executives at Manitoba's other aboriginal treatment centres expressed surprise at the amount of federal money received by Virginia Fontaine.

Courchene argued that the treatment centre was not required to cede its financial records to federal auditors, saying that the institution was an independent contractor in partnership with the government. He later agreed to provide the government with documents covering the period after July 1, 2000. The federal government accepted this condition in mid-November.

One month later, Health Canada announced that it was withdrawing financial support from the centre. A representative said that the federal agency had "lost confidence in the foundation's ability to manage the funds they've been receiving", adding that staff were not cooperating with the audit. The federal government subsequently sued Virginia Fontaine Addictions Foundation Inc. and its directors for the recovery of public funds, and attempted to bring the centre into receivership.

In February 2001, Courchene acknowledged that he had made several incorrect statements in a prior affidavit detailing the centre's financial activities. Among other things, he retracted his claim that the centre had never held board meetings before negotiating a $35 million deal with the federal government. He also said that he did not know the source of $491,000 deposited in the centre's account in September, and blamed a bad memory and shoddy bookkeeping for the discrepancies.

Associate Justice Jeffrey Oliphant of the Court of Queen's Bench of Manitoba issued a scathing indictment of financial practices at the centre on February 8, 2001, and gave the federal government permission to conduct an "unrestricted audit". The centre closed later in the month. It was later revealed that SJC Consulting, operated by Courchene's cousin Steve Courchene, received $1.9 million from the centre between April 1, 1992 and September 30, 1995. Steve Courchene was an executive member of the Virginia Fontaine Memorial Centre at the time of the payments.

The Fontaine Centre's executive members initially filed a joint statement of defence in response to the federal government's civil suit. This unity collapsed in 2005, when Courchene, Lana Daniels and Keith Fontaine submitted that centre director Perry Fontaine and two federal officials had conspired for the deliberate misuse of public monies. Courchene, Daniels and Keith Fontaine sued Perry Fontaine and the federal government, and were in turn sued by Perry Fontaine. In November 2005, the federal government further alleged that Ken Courchene, Steve Courchene, Keith Fontaine and Perry Fontaine were part of a conspiracy to defraud the federal government of $332,000 relating to the lease on a gym they claimed to own.

None of the charges against Courchene have been proven in court.

== Magistrate ==
In July 2002, Ken Courchene was appointed by the province of Manitoba as magistrate for the Sagkeeng and Pine Falls area. Joy Smith, the opposition Justice Critic, unsuccessfully called for the appointment to be rescinded. His duties included authorizing police searches, issuing summons and taking oaths, and he often worked from the RCMP detachment in Powerview.

Courchene's position was placed under judicial scrutiny in early 2004, after a forensic audit drew attention to "unusual" payments he received from the Virginia Fontaine Addictions Foundation over a 29-month period. Provincial justice officials argued that the payments raised "a perception of poor judgment and conduct unbecoming of a judicial officer". The presiding judge ruled in favour of Courchene, determining that the accusations amounted to "perception, innuendo or untested allegations" rather than concrete evidence.
