= Cynthia Toohey =

American politician (1934–2021)

Member of the Alaska House of Representatives from the 13th district
- In office 1993–1997
- Succeeded by: Ethan Berkowitz

Personal details
- Born: April 16, 1934 New York City, New York, U.S.
- Died: January 29, 2021 (aged 86) Anchorage, Alaska, U.S.
- Party: Republican
- Education: University of Alaska Anchorage (A.S.)

Cynthia Toohey (born April 16, 1934 – January 29, 2021) was an American nurse, businesswoman, and Republican politician.

Born in New York City, Toohey graduated from Julia Richman High School in 1953. In 1958, Toohey moved to Alaska and eventually settled in Anchorage. She received her associate degree in nursing from University of Alaska Anchorage and became a registered nurse. Toohey also owned the Crow Creek Mine. She served as chair of the Girdwood, Anchorage Board of Supervisors within the Anchorage Municipality. From 1993 to 1997, Toohey served in the Alaska House of Representatives.
