= Bernadette Smith =

Canadian politician

The Honourable Bernadette Smith OM MLA

Minister of Housing, Addictions, and Homelessness
- Incumbent
- Assumed office October 18, 2023
- Premier: Wab Kinew
- Preceded by: Portfolio established

Member of the Legislative Assembly of Manitoba for Point Douglas
- Incumbent
- Assumed office June 13, 2017
- Preceded by: Kevin Chief

Personal details
- Born: 1973 or 1974 (age 52–53) Winnipeg, Manitoba, Canada
- Party: New Democratic
- Education: Red River College; University of Winnipeg (BA, BEd)

Bernadette Smith OM MLA (born 1973 or 1974) is a Canadian First Nations politician who was elected to the Legislative Assembly of Manitoba in a by-election on June 13, 2017. She represents the electoral district of Point Douglas as a member of the Manitoba New Democratic Party. In November 2023, Smith was named to the BBC's 100 Women list.

== Personal life and education ==
Smith was born and raised in Winnipeg. She left school in Grade 11, completing her high school education at age 22. She subsequently obtained a Child and Youth Care Certificate from Red River College. Smith also obtained Bachelor of Arts and Bachelor of Education degrees from the University of Winnipeg.

Smith is Anishinaabe and Métis. Her sister, Claudette Priscilla June Osborne-Tyo, has been missing from Winnipeg since 2008. She has three children: Aron, Matthew and Makena.

She was awarded the Order of Manitoba in 2016.

== Career ==
She was a teacher at Maples Collegiate and the Assistant Director of WayFinders Program at the Seven Oaks School Division. She is the co-founder of the Manitoba Coalition of Families of Missing and Murdered Women in Manitoba (CFMMWM) and the Drag the Red Initiative.

== Politics ==
Smith was the only candidate to submit her name in order to qualify as the New Democratic Party's candidate for Point Douglas in the 2017 by-election. During the campaign, the opposing Progressive Conservative Party filed a complaint with Elections Manitoba alleging that Smith had improperly campaigned at polling stations. Smith won the seat with 44% of the vote.

She was re-elected in the 2019 provincial election and the 2023 Manitoba general election.

Smith has advocated for some form of government investment in order to preserve the Neechi Commons grocery store and arts centre.

== Electoral history ==
2023 Manitoba general election: Point Douglas
Party	Candidate	Votes	%	±%	Expenditures
New Democratic	Bernadette Smith	3,367	73.31	+11.18	$22,793.24
Progressive Conservative	Najiha Ali	742	16.16	+0.49	$0.00
Liberal	Jerald Funk	484	10.54	-1.16	$311.30
Total valid votes/expense limit		4,593	99.46	–	$55,071.00
Total rejected and declined ballots		25	0.54	–	
Turnout		4,618	32.76	-3.24	
Eligible voters		14,097			
New Democratic hold		Swing		+5.35	
Source(s) Source: Elections Manitoba

2019 Manitoba general election: Point Douglas
Party	Candidate	Votes	%	±%	Expenditures
New Democratic	Bernadette Smith	3,002	62.13	+17.78	$19,767.20
Progressive Conservative	Michelle Redmond	757	15.67	-0.58	$521.28
Liberal	Richard Sanderson	565	11.69	-17.39	$0.00
Green	Jenn Kess	398	8.24	+3.99	$0.00
Manitoba Forward	Michael Wenuik	66	1.37		$0.00
Communist	Fagie Fainman	44	0.91	+0.07	$310.80
Total valid votes		4,832	100.0		
Total rejected ballots					
Turnout					
Eligible voters					

Manitoba provincial by-election, 13 June 2017: Point Douglas Resignation of Kevin Chief
Party	Candidate	Votes	%	±%	Expenditures
New Democratic	Bernadette Smith	1,568	44.35	-13.46	$35,313.48
Liberal	John Cacayuran	1,006	29.08	+9.62	$19,478.56
Progressive Conservative	Jodi Moskal	562	16.25	-0.27	$35,068.27
Manitoba	Gary Marshall	181	5.23		$5,528.56
Green	Sabrina Koehn Binesi	147	4.25	-0.78	$2,230.86
Communist	Frank Komarniski	27	0.84	-0.34	$9.44
Total valid votes/Expense limit		3,491	100.00	-	$37,179.00
Total rejected and declines votes		23	0.72	-0.45	
Turnout		3,514	32.38	-10.16	
Electors on the lists		11,207			
New Democratic hold		Swing		-11.54	
Source: Elections Manitoba
