= Kevin Chief =

Canadian politician (born 1974)

Manitoba Minister of Jobs and the Economy
- In office November 4, 2014 – May 3, 2016
- Premier: Greg Selinger
- Preceded by: Theresa Oswald
- Succeeded by: Cliff Cullen As Minister of Growth, Enterprise and Trade

Manitoba Minister of Children and Youth Opportunities
- In office January 13, 2012 – November 4, 2014
- Premier: Greg Selinger
- Preceded by: new portfolio
- Succeeded by: Melanie Wight

Member of the Legislative Assembly of Manitoba for Point Douglas
- In office October 4, 2011 – January 9, 2017
- Preceded by: George Hickes
- Succeeded by: Bernadette Smith

Personal details
- Born: 1974 (age 51–52) Winnipeg, Manitoba, Canada
- Party: New Democrat
- Education: University of Winnipeg
- Website: kevinchief.ca

Kevin Chief (born 1974) is a Canadian politician, who was elected to the Legislative Assembly of Manitoba in the 2011 election. He represented the electoral district of Point Douglas from 2011 to 2017 as a member of the New Democratic Party caucus.

In 2010, Chief was named a recipient of the Future Leaders of Manitoba award in the community service category. Other notable recipients include indigenous activist Michael Redhead Champagne, Canadian filmmaker and director Adam Smoluk, community leader Hannah Pratt, surgeon and university associate professor Jordan Hochman, president of Manitoba SwimAbility Cameron Krisko, and young philanthropist Ben Sabic.

== Political career ==
Chief ran for a seat to the House of Commons of Canada in a by-election held on November 29, 2010. The election was hotly contested between Chief, who ran under the federal NDP banner, and former Manitoba MLA Kevin Lamoureux, who ran under the federal Liberal banner. On election night, Chief finished a close second behind Lamoureux in the field of seven candidates.

After his defeat, Chief opted not to run for a second time federally, instead going for a provincial Manitoba NDP nomination. He ran in the electoral district of Point Douglas in the 2011 Manitoba general election and won, defeating four other candidates to hold the seat for his party and win his first term in the Legislative Assembly of Manitoba. On January 13, 2011, he was made minister responsible for the newly created Department of Children and Youth Opportunities.

On November 3, 2014, Chief was appointed as Minister of Jobs and the Economy after the resignation of then-Minister Theresa Oswald, along with four other ministers, resigned from cabinet over concerns about Premier Greg Selinger's leadership.

Chief retained his seat in the 2016 general election and was touted as a leading candidate to succeed Selinger as NDP leader. However, he announced in September 2016 that he would not run for the leadership of the party.

He announced in December 2016 that he would resign his seat in the legislature for family reasons. His resignation became official on January 9, 2017.

== Electoral record ==
By-election on November 29, 2010 resignation of Judy Wasylycia-Leis on April 30, 2010
| Party | Candidate | Votes | % | ±% |
|---|---|---|---|---|
| Liberal | Kevin Lamoureux | 7,303 | 46.3 | +37.08 |
| New Democratic | Kevin Chief | 6,508 | 41.2 | −21.41 |
| Conservative | Julie Javier | 1,645 | 10.4 | −11.95 |
| Green | John Harvie | 114 | 0.7 | −4.05 |
| Pirate | Jeff Coleman | 94 | 0.6 | N/A |
| Communist | Frank Komarniski | 71 | 0.4 | −0.27 |
| Christian Heritage | Eric Truijen | 45 | 0.3 | N/A |
| Total valid votes | | 15,780 | | |
| Total rejected ballots | | – | | |
| Turnout | | – | 30.8 | |
| Liberal gain from New Democrats | | | | |

2011 Manitoba general election: Point Douglas
| Party | Candidate | Votes | % | ±% | Expenditures |
|---|---|---|---|---|---|
| New Democratic | Kevin Chief | 3,806 | 73.28 | +6.92 | $18,567.73 |
| Progressive Conservative | John Vernaus | 917 | 17.65 | +5.68 | $19,915.21 |
| Liberal | Mary Lou Bourgeois | 257 | 4.95 | −9.77 | $5,383.65 |
| Green | Teresa Pun | 176 | 3.39 | −1.92 | $17.48 |
| Communist | Darrell Rankin | 38 | 0.73 | −0.91 | $312.12 |
| Total valid votes | | 5,194 | | | |
| Rejected and declined votes | | 28 | 0.54 | -0.18 | |
| Turnout | | 5,222 | 44.04 | +3.90 | |
| Electors on the lists | | 11,858 | | | |
| New Democratic hold | | Swing | | +0.62 | |

2016 Manitoba general election: Point Douglas
| Party | Candidate | Votes | % | ±% |
|---|---|---|---|---|
| New Democratic | Kevin Chief | 2,839 | 57.80 | -15.08 |
| Liberal | Althea Guiboche | 956 | 19.46 | +14.54 |
| Progressive Conservative | Marsha Street | 811 | 16.51 | -1.05 |
| Green | Alberteen Spence | 247 | 5.02 | +1.65 |
| Communist | Frank Komarniski | 58 | 1.18 | +0.45 |
| Total valid votes | | 4,911 | 100.0 | |
| Eligible voters | | – | | |
Source: Elections Manitoba
