= Slaw Rebchuk =

Slaw Rebchuk (February 10, 1907 – January 15, 1996) was a longtime municipal politician in Winnipeg, Manitoba, Canada, popularly known as the "Mayor of the North End".

Rebchuk was born to a Ukrainian immigrant family in north-end Winnipeg, and graduated from St. John's High School. He worked in the dry goods business, and was a softball catcher for thirty years. He was also active with the Ukrainian Catholic Brotherhood and the Knights of Columbus. The Vatican awarded him one of its highest honours, the Knighthood of the Order of St. Gregory the Great, in 1981.

Rebchuk became active with the Young Liberal Association in 1925, and contested his first election in 1938. Running for a school trustee position, he lost to Andrew Biletski of the Communist Party.

Rebchuk was first elected to the Winnipeg City Council in 1949 for Winnipeg's third ward, as candidate of the right-leaning Civic Election Committee (CEC). Civic elections in this period were conducted by preferential balloting; although the third ward was located in Winnipeg's predominantly working-class and left-leaning north end, the CEC was usually able to win one of its three seats. Rebchuk described himself as a "rightist".

Notwithstanding that he was a smoker, Rebchuk co-sponsored a successful motion in 1964 to ban smoking in the council chamber. The following year, he brought forward a motion to withdraw the City of Winnipeg from the regional Metropolitan Corporation. This was defeated by a vote of 9-7. The CEC changed its name to the Greater Winnipeg Election Committee in the mid-1960s. Rebchuk broke from this group to sit as an independent councillor, and was chosen as Winnipeg's acting mayor and finance committee chairman in 1969 as part of an arrangement with left-leaning councillors. He left council in 1977 following twenty-eight years of continuous service, after losing his redistributed ward to New Democrat Bill Chornopyski (the city had previously switched to single-member ward representation).

The City of Winnipeg named a bridge in Rebchuk's honour in 1984. A newspaper report from that year indicates that Rebchuk, then 77, was still serving on a hospital board and two city boards, and was actively operating an insurance business.

Rebchuk was initially aligned with the Liberal-Progressive Party at the provincial level, and ran unsuccessfully under its banner in the 1958 election. He crossed to the Progressive Conservative Party in 1969, and unsuccessfully contested Point Douglas under its banner in the 1969 election.

Former Cooperative Commonwealth Federation leader Lloyd Stinson once described Rebchuk as "the most experienced man around City Hall and certainly the hardest worker [...] warm-hearted, rambunctious, garrulous and illogical much of the time", while fellow councillor Bernie Wolfe once said "he has a heart like a hotel and is generous to a fault".

Rebchuk was also known for his colourful verbal gaffes, some of which were reprinted by Reader's Digest. Lloyd Stinson attributes the phrase "A verbal agreement isn't worth the paper it's written on" to Rebchuk, although others have attributed it to Sam Goldwyn.

Slaw Rebchuk left behind three children: Brian, Noelle and Chris Rebchuk. All of them have died except for Chris Rebchuk, who has two children: Jacqueline and Alexander Rebchuk. Noelle is survived by her husband, Gordon De Wolfe, and their son, Brian De Wolfe.
