= 1990 Manitoba general election =

← 1988	September 11, 1990	1995 →

57 seats of the Legislative Assembly of Manitoba 29 seats were needed for a majority
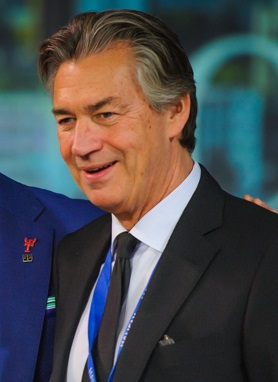
	First party	Second party	Third party
	PC		LIB
Leader	Gary Filmon	Gary Doer	Sharon Carstairs
Party	Progressive Conservative	New Democratic	Liberal
Leader since	December 10, 1983	March 30, 1988	March 4, 1984
Leader's seat	Tuxedo	Concordia	River Heights
Last election	25	12	20
Seats won	30	20	7
Seat change	▲5	▲8	▼13
Popular vote	206,810	141,328	138,146
Percentage	41.99%	28.80%	28.15%
Swing	▲3.62%	▲5.18%	▼7.37%
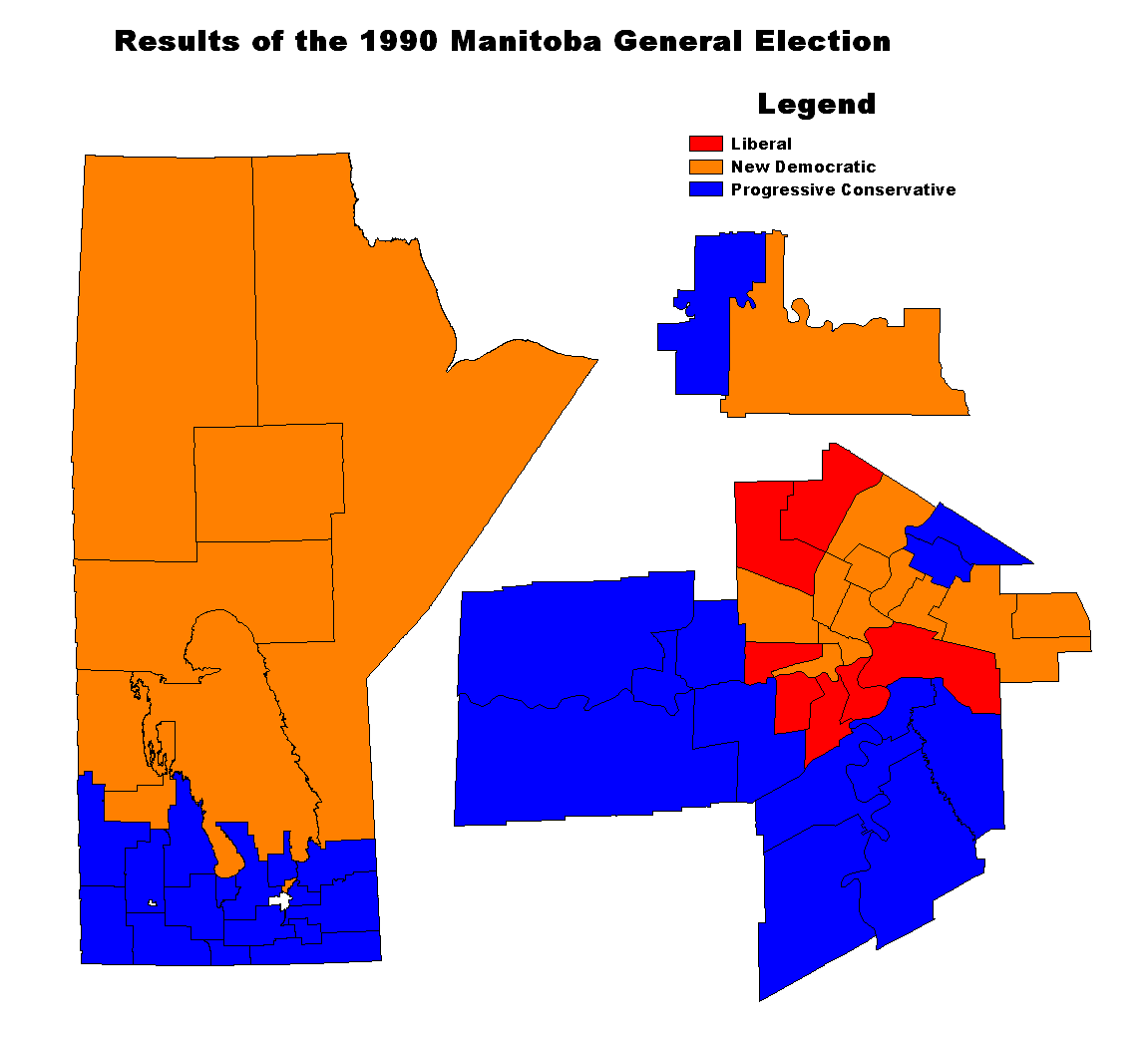
- Map of Election Results
Premier before election
Gary Filmon
Progressive Conservative
Premier after election
Gary Filmon
Progressive Conservative

The 1990 Manitoba general election was held on September 11, 1990 to elect Members of the Legislative Assembly (MLAs) of the Province of Manitoba, Canada. It was won by the Progressive Conservative (PC) Party, which took 30 out of 57 seats. The New Democratic Party finished second with 20, while the Liberal Party fell from 21 to 7.

== Background ==
The 1990 election took place against the backdrop of the failed Meech Lake constitutional accord, which sought to clarify Quebec's position within Canada. The accord, which was signed in 1988, required passage by the federal government and the ten provincial governments before June 23, 1990 to become law. Although Manitoba Premier Howard Pawley had approved the accord in 1987, his government did not bring it before the legislature before their surprise defeat in 1988.

Pawley's replacement, PC leader Gary Filmon, was less inclined to support the deal, and requested that certain aspects be re-negotiated before his government would grant approval. After some reluctance, Prime Minister Brian Mulroney allowed re-negotiations with all provincial Premiers, and convinced Filmon to introduce the accord to the Manitoba legislature shortly before the scheduled deadline. Liberal leader Sharon Carstairs and NDP leader Gary Doer were also willing to support the revised deal.

Some members of Doer's caucus still opposed the accord, however. When it was put before the legislature, NDP MLA Elijah Harper refused to grant unanimous leave for emergency debate, on the grounds that the deal did not recognize the position of aboriginals in Canada's constitutional framework. Harper, the first indigenous member of the Manitoba legislature, was strongly supported by aboriginal leaders such as Phil Fontaine and Ovide Mercredi, and continued his protest in the legislature during the following weeks. With assistance from former parliamentary clerk Gord Mackintosh, Harper was able to delay the legislative process until the accord simply could not be passed on time. Harper became a national celebrity, and polls showed that most English-speaking Canadians supported his stand.

Ironically, Gary Filmon's Tories may have benefitted from Harper's actions. Filmon was a long-time opponent of the accord, and was a fairly tepid supporter even after the renegotiated compromise was reached. Subsequently, Filmon used the accord's failure to highlight differences between himself and Mulroney, who was becoming increasingly unpopular as Prime Minister.

== Reorganization of electoral divisions ==
An Act was passed in 1989, providing for the following changes to representation in the Legislative Assembly:

Abolished ridings	New ridings
Abolished ridings
Churchill	divided among Flin Flon, Rupertsland and Thompson
Ellice	merged with Wolseley
New ridings
	Seine River (Note: from parts of Niakwa and Riel)
	Wellington (Note: from part of Burrows)
Merger of ridings
Arthur; Virden	Arthur-Virden
Reorganization of ridings
Kildonan; Seven Oaks	Kildonan; The Maples
Emerson; Rhineland	Emerson; Steinbach (Note: plus part of La Verendrye)
Division of ridings
Fort Rouge	Broadway; Crescentwood; part to Osborne
Renaming of ridings
Logan	Point Douglas (Note: also taking in parts of Burrows and St. Johns)

== Issues ==
Filmon's Progressive Conservatives made the fewest promises of any major party. Their platform called for an end to abuse of the elderly in retirement homes, environmental initiatives, and low-cost economic development. They proposed to cut the size of the Winnipeg City Council, and vowed not to raise taxes.

The Liberals focused on economic issues, promising a major investment in job training, research and development, and business support. They also proposed to cut the Winnipeg Council, create government grants for tourism and adult education, and restore Tory cuts to health and other programs.

The NDP platform focused on workers' concerns, the environment, preventive health programs and housing. They supported an increase in the minimum wage, affirmative action programs, and laws which would make it expensive to shut down plants in Manitoba. They also promised not to raise taxes, and opposed the sale of Manfor Ltd., a Crown corporation owned by the Province of Manitoba.

== The campaign ==
A poll published in the Winnipeg Free Press indicated that the NDP were the most trusted party on economic issues, followed by the Tories. The NDP were still damaged from their poor showing in the 1988 election, however, and began the campaign in third place. The struggle for government initially appeared to be between the Liberals and Progressive Conservatives.

The Liberals ran a weak campaign, however, and were overtaken by the NDP after a strong performance from Gary Doer in the leaders' debate. Doer further increased the NDP's standing in the last weeks of the campaign by highlighting the connections between Filmon and the Mulroney government on a number of issues. The NDP's return to official opposition status was regarded as a major development after their near-collapse in 1988.

== Opinion polls ==
Evolution of voting intentions at provincial level
Polling firm	Last day of survey	Source	PC	MLP	NDP	Other	ME	Sample
Election 1990	September 11, 1990		41.99	28.15	28.80	1.06		
Viewpoints	March 1990		36.8	36.8	26.5	—	—	—
Election 1988	April 26, 1988		38.37	35.52	23.62	2.49		

== Results ==
The Tories continued their dominance in Manitoba's rural south, winning every seat in the region. They also won 13 of 31 seats in Winnipeg and a few ridings to the city's immediate north, enough to provide the party with a majority of two.

The NDP won 11 seats in Winnipeg, and swept the province's north. They also won four seats in the mid-northern region, and retained Brandon East, their lone southern riding outside of Winnipeg.

All seven seats retained by the Liberals were in Winnipeg, mostly in the centre and northwest of the city. With few exceptions, many of the centre-left voters who had voted Liberal in 1988 switched back to the NDP.

Party	Party Leader	# of candidates	Seats			Popular Vote		
Party	Party Leader	# of candidates	Before^{1}	Elected	% Change	#	%	Change
Progressive Conservative	Gary Filmon	57	24	30	+25.0%	206,810	41.99%	+3.62
New Democratic	Gary Doer	57	12	20	+66.7%	141,328	28.80%	+5.18
Liberal	Sharon Carstairs	57	21	7	-66.7%	138,146	28.15%	-7.37
Confederation of Regions	Irene Armishaw (president)	5	-	-	-	1,564	0.32%	-1.00
Western Independence	Fred Cameron	6	-	-	-	1,355	0.28%	-0.17
Progressive	Sidney Green	5	-	-	-	1,163	0.24%	+0.06
Libertarian	Clancy Smith	5	-	-	-	637	0.13%	+0.04
Communist	Frank Goldspink (organizer)	1	-	-	-	25	0.00%	-0.05
Independent		5	-	-	-	450	0.09%	-0.30
Total		198	57	57	-	490,690	100%	

^{1} "Before" refers to standings in the Legislature at dissolution, and not to the results of the previous election. These numbers therefore reflect changes in party standings as a result of by-elections and members crossing the floor.

=== Vote and seat summaries ===
Ternary plots – shift of electoral support (1988–1990)
1988

1990
Electoral districts identified by colours of winning parties

Popular vote
PC	41.99%
New Democratic	28.80%
Liberal	28.15%
Others	1.06%

Seats summary
PC	52.63%
New Democratic	35.09%
Liberal	12.28%

=== Synopsis of results ===
1990 Manitoba general election – synopsis of riding results
Electoral division	Winning party							Votes (Note: All parties with more than 1% of the vote are shown individually. Independent candidates and other minor parties are aggregated separately.)					
Electoral division	1988	1st place	Votes	Share	Margin #	Margin %	2nd place	PC	NDP	Lib	Ind	Oth	Total
Arthur-Virden	New	PC	4,773	59.26%	2,688	33.37%	Lib	4,773	1,197	2,085	–	–	8,055
Assiniboia	Lib	PC	4,054	49.85%	1,324	16.28%	Lib	4,054	1,348	2,730	–	–	8,132
Brandon East	NDP	NDP	4,760	53.51%	1,544	17.36%	PC	3,216	4,760	919	–	–	8,895
Brandon West	PC	PC	4,736	55.47%	2,362	27.66%	NDP	4,736	2,374	1,428	–	–	8,538
Broadway	New	NDP	2,508	38.72%	108	1.67%	Lib	1,570	2,508	2,400	–	–	6,478
Burrows	Lib	NDP	4,206	54.34%	2,150	27.78%	Lib	1,478	4,206	2,056	–	–	7,740
Charleswood	PC	PC	5,419	57.56%	2,507	26.63%	Lib	5,419	1,084	2,912	–	–	9,415
Concordia	NDP	NDP	4,588	58.17%	2,651	33.61%	PC	1,937	4,588	1,059	–	303	7,887
Crescentwood	New	Lib	4,588	45.65%	1,310	13.03%	PC	3,278	2,184	4,588	–	–	10,050
Dauphin	NDP	NDP	4,802	48.83%	1,378	14.01%	PC	3,424	4,802	1,608	–	–	9,834
Elmwood	NDP	NDP	4,127	46.98%	1,092	12.43%	PC	3,035	4,127	1,623	–	–	8,785
Emerson	PC	PC	4,529	61.85%	2,790	38.10%	Lib	4,529	1,055	1,739	–	–	7,323
Flin Flon	NDP	NDP	4,153	69.08%	3,027	50.35%	PC	1,126	4,153	733	–	–	6,012
Fort Garry	Lib	PC	5,105	47.07%	1,113	10.26%	Lib	5,105	1,500	3,992	–	249	10,846
Gimli	PC	PC	5,118	52.43%	2,452	25.12%	NDP	5,118	2,666	1,978	–	–	9,762
Gladstone	PC	PC	4,371	59.21%	2,559	34.67%	Lib	4,371	788	1,812	–	411	7,382
Inkster	Lib	Lib	3,602	45.87%	965	12.29%	NDP	1,416	2,637	3,602	–	198	7,853
Interlake	NDP	NDP	2,941	40.54%	408	5.62%	PC	2,533	2,941	1,781	–	–	7,255
Kildonan	Lib	NDP	3,904	35.69%	210	1.92%	PC	3,694	3,904	2,771	–	570	10,939
Kirkfield Park	PC	PC	5,813	56.42%	2,383	23.13%	Lib	5,813	1,035	3,430	–	25	10,303
La Vérendrye	PC	PC	3,731	44.49%	1,013	12.08%	Lib	3,731	1,938	2,718	–	–	8,387
Lac du Bonnet	PC	PC	5,162	53.70%	2,020	21.01%	NDP	5,162	3,142	1,309	–	–	9,613
Lakeside	PC	PC	3,719	49.69%	1,783	23.82%	Lib	3,719	1,248	1,936	–	581	7,484
Minnedosa	PC	PC	4,294	53.00%	2,091	25.81%	Lib	4,294	1,605	2,203	–	–	8,102
Morris	PC	PC	5,353	63.64%	3,317	39.43%	Lib	5,353	721	2,036	–	302	8,412
Niakwa	Lib	PC	4,950	46.50%	649	6.10%	Lib	4,950	1,394	4,301	–	–	10,645
Osborne	Lib	Lib	3,941	40.21%	1,080	11.02%	NDP	2,859	2,861	3,941	–	139	9,800
Pembina	PC	PC	5,497	78.73%	4,664	66.80%	Lib	5,497	652	833	–	–	6,982
Point Douglas	NDP	NDP	2,778	54.72%	1,228	24.19%	Lib	575	2,778	1,550	174	–	5,077
Portage la Prairie	PC	PC	4,276	53.85%	1,947	24.52%	Lib	4,276	1,092	2,329	–	243	7,940
Radisson	Lib	NDP	4,055	46.76%	1,363	15.72%	PC	2,692	4,055	1,925	–	–	8,672
Riel	PC	PC	3,756	43.32%	882	10.17%	Lib	3,756	2,041	2,874	–	–	8,671
River East	PC	PC	4,963	52.73%	2,474	26.29%	NDP	4,963	2,489	1,960	–	–	9,412
River Heights	Lib	Lib	5,467	47.97%	866	7.60%	PC	4,601	1,190	5,467	–	138	11,396
Roblin-Russell	PC	PC	4,382	52.31%	2,144	25.59%	NDP	4,382	2,238	1,757	–	–	8,377
Rossmere	PC	PC	3,893	42.33%	1,168	12.70%	NDP	3,893	2,725	2,416	–	163	9,197
Rupertsland	NDP	NDP	3,798	77.37%	2,994	60.99%	PC	804	3,798	307	–	–	4,909
Seine River	New	PC	4,465	40.72%	47	0.43%	Lib	4,465	1,792	4,418	–	289	10,964
Selkirk	Lib	NDP	3,735	36.58%	268	2.62%	PC	3,467	3,735	3,009	–	–	10,211
Springfield	PC	PC	5,146	49.11%	1,772	16.91%	NDP	5,146	3,374	1,958	–	–	10,478
St. Boniface	Lib	Lib	4,928	55.40%	2,882	32.40%	NDP	1,921	2,046	4,928	–	–	8,895
St. James	Lib	Lib	3,014	35.09%	295	3.43%	PC	2,719	2,586	3,014	–	270	8,589
St. Johns	NDP	NDP	4,392	52.86%	1,978	23.81%	Lib	1,502	4,392	2,414	–	–	8,308
St. Norbert	Lib	PC	4,502	45.48%	117	1.18%	Lib	4,502	1,011	4,385	–	–	9,898
St. Vital	Lib	PC	3,361	36.30%	118	1.27%	Lib	3,361	2,368	3,243	–	288	9,260
Ste. Rose	PC	PC	3,646	51.58%	1,764	24.96%	Lib	3,646	1,540	1,882	–	–	7,068
Steinbach	New	PC	5,540	75.64%	4,369	59.65%	Lib	5,540	483	1,171	–	130	7,324
Sturgeon Creek	Lib	PC	4,676	46.51%	769	7.65%	Lib	4,676	1,471	3,907	–	–	10,054
Swan River	PC	NDP	3,872	45.69%	233	2.75%	PC	3,639	3,872	963	–	–	8,474
The Maples	New	Lib	3,273	39.83%	589	7.17%	PC	2,684	2,260	3,273	–	–	8,217
The Pas	NDP	NDP	3,390	44.36%	143	1.87%	PC	3,247	3,390	1,005	–	–	7,642
Thompson	NDP	NDP	4,099	59.93%	2,056	30.06%	PC	2,043	4,099	698	–	–	6,840
Transcona	Lib	NDP	4,363	49.48%	1,809	20.52%	Lib	1,732	4,363	2,554	–	168	8,817
Turtle Mountain	PC	PC	4,702	58.68%	2,611	32.58%	Lib	4,702	1,047	2,091	173	–	8,013
Tuxedo	PC	PC	7,861	65.14%	4,580	37.95%	Lib	7,861	926	3,281	–	–	12,068
Wellington	New	NDP	3,484	46.01%	1,160	15.32%	Lib	1,534	3,484	2,324	103	128	7,573
Wolseley	Lib	NDP	3,265	43.90%	745	10.02%	Lib	1,503	3,265	2,520	–	149	7,437

= open seat
= winning candidate was in previous Legislature
= incumbent had switched allegiance
= previously incumbent in another riding
= not incumbent; was previously elected to the Legislature
= other incumbents renominated
= previously an MP in the House of Commons of Canada
= multiple candidates

=== Turnout, winning shares and swings ===
Summary of riding results by turnout, vote share for winning candidate, and swing (vs 1988)
Riding and winning party			Turnout		Vote share (Note: Share won by winning candidate, with difference noted from share achieved by the same party in 1986.)		Swing (Note: Positive indicates improvement to standing of party winning in 1986; negative points to 1986's second-place party being swung to.)	
Riding and winning party			%	Change (pp)	%	Change (pp)	To	Change (pp)
Arthur-Virden	PC		65.01		59.26			
Assiniboia	PC	Gain	69.83	-4.63	49.85	7.68	PC	-9.20
Brandon East	NDP	Hold	67.52	-7.85	53.51	13.78	NDP	4.99
Brandon West	PC	Hold	69.69	-2.85	55.47	9.54	PC	12.90
Broadway	NDP		61.59		38.72			
Burrows	NDP	Gain	66.86	0.82	54.34	13.55	NDP	-14.63
Charleswood	PC	Hold	74.65	-5.41	57.56	9.43	PC	10.36
Concordia	NDP	Hold	68.38	-8.05	58.17	20.46	NDP	18.53
Crescentwood	Lib		71.76		45.65			
Dauphin	NDP	Hold	76.67	-7.06	48.83	8.57	NDP	4.24
Elmwood	NDP	Hold	71.63	3.65	46.98	8.77	NDP	13.15
Emerson	PC	Hold	61.58	-10.77	61.85	8.45	PC	6.24
Flin Flon	NDP	Hold	62.52	0.10	69.08	14.26	NDP	12.30
Fort Garry	PC	Gain	72.96	-5.26	47.07	7.27	PC	-8.52
Gimli	PC	Hold	72.00	-6.94	52.43	8.25	PC	6.17
Gladstone	PC	Hold	60.42	-3.94	59.21	6.70	PC	5.96
Inkster	Lib	Hold	64.28	-5.17	45.87	4.44	Lib	4.44
Interlake	NDP	Hold	62.89	-4.70	40.54	0.55	NDP	1.20
Kildonan	NDP	Gain	75.14	-1.34	35.69	7.02	PC	-6.07
Kirkfield Park	PC	Hold	77.41	-2.4	56.42	9.17	PC	10.42
La Vérendrye	PC	Hold	66.68	6.90	44.49	-10.00	Lib	-2.86
Lac du Bonnet	PC	Hold	73.06	-4.41	53.70	12.21	PC	5.77
Lakeside	PC	Hold	63.31	-7.14	49.69	0.73	PC	2.90
Minnedosa	PC	Hold	64.43	-7.68	53.00	9.64	PC	5.97
Morris	PC	Hold	65.77	-3.46	63.64	2.70	PC	1.44
Niakwa	PC	Gain	77.50	-2.14	46.50	6.51	PC	-6.80
Osborne	Lib	Hold	71.64	-7.21	40.21	-4.68	NDP	-2.68
Pembina	PC	Hold	58.33	-12.65	78.73	12.29	PC	12.11
Point Douglas	NDP	Hold	60.92	-0.43	54.72	6.77	NDP	3.16
Portage la Prairie	PC	Hold	65.82	-5.89	53.85	4.57	PC	4.86
Radisson	NDP	Gain	67.88	-9.61	46.76	18.66	NDP	-20.43
Riel	PC	Hold	71.01	-6.87	43.32	1.61	PC	3.51
River East	PC	Hold	73.93	-3.24	52.73	1.00	PC	3.10
River Heights	Lib	Hold	81.46	-5.61	47.97	-11.72	PC	-10.84
Roblin-Russell	PC	Hold	64.97	-13.93	52.31	4.99	PC	6.76
Rossmere	PC	Hold	74.46	-9.17	42.33	4.24	PC	3.81
Rupertsland	NDP	Hold	46.60	3.45	77.37	25.62	NDP	21.26
Seine River	PC		72.89		40.72			
Selkirk	NDP	Gain	74.44	-6.01	36.58	2.93	NDP	-4.41
Springfield	PC	Hold	73.40	-4.34	49.11	5.62	PC	7.70
St. Boniface	Lib	Hold	70.07	-9.70	55.40	-5.76	NDP	-3.41
St. James	Lib	Hold	73.37	-5.17	35.09	-5.05	PC	-1.23
St. Johns	NDP	Hold	69.18	2.66	52.86	9.12	NDP	7.57
St. Norbert	PC	Gain	73.53	-3.42	45.48	2.43	PC	-2.02
St. Vital	PC	Gain	73.00	-6.08	36.30	1.86	PC	-4.53
Ste. Rose	PC	Hold	61.61	-9.40	51.58	5.43	PC	5.71
Steinbach	PC		57.71		75.64			
Sturgeon Creek	PC	Gain	74.22	-2.51	46.51	5.53	PC	-7.06
Swan River	NDP	Gain	73.29	-10.63	45.69	3.74	NDP	-5.45
The Maples	Lib		67.00		39.83			
The Pas	NDP	Hold	65.77	-7.30	44.36	-7.33	PC	-12.20
Thompson	NDP	Hold	63.05	-10.11	59.93	11.83	NDP	6.97
Transcona	NDP	Gain	70.22	-7.49	49.48	15.83	NDP	-14.00
Turtle Mountain	PC	Hold	66.70	-8.00	58.68	17.00	PC	12.41
Tuxedo	PC	Hold	75.50	-4.27	65.14	17.86	PC	18.52
Wellington	NDP		68.25		46.01			
Wolseley	NDP	Gain	70.22	-4.23	43.90	7.11	NDP	-8.00

=== Changes in party shares ===
Share change analysis by party and riding (1990 vs 1988)
Riding	Liberal		NDP		PC	
Riding	%	Change (pp)	%	Change (pp)	%	Change (pp)
Arthur-Virden	25.88	New	14.86	New	59.26	New
Assiniboia	33.57	-10.72	16.58	4.92	49.85	7.68
Brandon East	10.33	-15.24	53.51	13.78	36.16	3.81
Brandon West	16.73	-16.26	27.81	6.72	55.47	9.54
Broadway	37.05	New	38.72	New	24.24	New
Burrows	26.56	-15.71	54.34	13.55	19.10	4.98
Charleswood	30.93	-11.28	11.51	3.00	57.56	9.43
Concordia	13.43	-16.60	58.17	20.46	24.56	-2.27
Crescentwood	45.65	New	21.73	New	32.62	New
Dauphin	16.35	-8.67	48.83	8.57	34.82	0.10
Elmwood	18.47	-17.53	46.98	8.77	34.55	10.19
Emerson	23.75	-4.03	14.41	-0.54	61.85	8.45
Flin Flon	12.19	-3.93	69.08	14.26	18.73	-10.33
Fort Garry	36.81	-9.77	13.83	1.88	47.07	7.27
Gimli	20.26	-1.72	27.31	-4.09	52.43	8.25
Gladstone	24.55	-5.23	10.67	3.57	59.21	6.70
Inkster	45.87	4.44	33.58	-4.44	18.03	-1.92
Interlake	24.55	1.30	40.54	0.55	34.91	-1.85
Kildonan	25.33	-10.35	35.69	7.02	33.77	1.78
Kirkfield Park	33.29	-11.67	10.05	2.26	56.42	9.17
La Vérendrye	32.41	-4.29	23.11	14.29	44.49	-10.00
Lac du Bonnet	13.62	-12.89	32.68	0.68	53.70	12.21
Lakeside	25.87	-5.08	16.68	6.04	49.69	0.73
Minnedosa	27.19	-2.31	19.81	2.37	53.00	9.64
Morris	24.20	-0.18	8.57	2.59	63.64	2.70
Niakwa	40.40	-7.08	13.10	1.88	46.50	6.51
Osborne	40.21	-4.68	29.19	0.67	29.17	4.09
Pembina	11.93	-11.94	9.34	5.14	78.73	12.29
Point Douglas	30.53	0.45	54.72	6.77	11.33	-8.34
Portage la Prairie	29.33	-5.14	13.75	4.90	53.85	4.57
Radisson	22.20	-22.19	46.76	18.66	31.04	3.52
Riel	33.14	-5.41	23.54	5.70	43.32	1.61
River East	20.82	-5.20	26.44	5.80	52.73	1.00
River Heights	47.97	-11.72	10.44	1.10	40.37	9.96
Roblin-Russell	20.97	-8.54	26.72	3.55	52.31	4.99
Rossmere	26.27	-1.22	29.63	-3.39	42.33	4.24
Rupertsland	6.25	-8.71	77.37	25.62	16.38	-16.91
Seine River	40.30	New	16.34	New	40.72	New
Selkirk	29.47	-5.88	36.58	2.93	33.95	4.92
Springfield	18.69	-9.78	32.20	4.16	49.11	5.62
St. Boniface	55.40	-5.76	23.00	1.05	21.60	4.71
St. James	35.09	-5.05	30.11	7.98	31.66	-2.59
St. Johns	29.06	-6.03	52.86	9.12	18.08	0.79
St. Norbert	44.30	-1.61	10.21	-0.82	45.48	2.43
St. Vital	35.02	-7.19	25.57	3.83	36.30	1.86
Ste. Rose	26.63	-5.99	21.79	3.64	51.58	5.43
Steinbach	15.99	New	6.59	New	75.64	New
Sturgeon Creek	38.86	-8.59	14.63	4.88	46.51	5.53
Swan River	11.36	3.41	45.69	3.74	42.94	-7.15
The Maples	39.83	New	27.50	New	32.66	New
The Pas	13.15	-9.73	44.36	-7.33	42.49	17.07
Thompson	10.20	-9.73	59.93	11.83	29.87	-2.10
Transcona	28.97	-12.16	49.48	15.83	19.64	-4.30
Turtle Mountain	26.10	-7.82	13.07	7.27	58.68	17.00
Tuxedo	27.19	-19.18	7.67	2.42	65.14	17.86
Wellington	30.69	New	46.01	New	20.26	New
Wolseley	33.88	-8.89	43.90	7.11	20.21	1.54

== Post-election changes ==
Electoral district	Candidates				Incumbent
Electoral district	PC	NDP	Liberal	Other	Incumbent
Crescentwood; September 15, 1992	Jenny Hillard; 1,995	Tim Sale; 2,256	Avis Gray; 2,697	Sidney Green (P); 900; Ken Carver (R); 97; Dennis Rice (Lbt); 19	Jim Carr
Portage la Prairie; September 15, 1992	Brian Pallister; 3,226	Ralph Jackson; 648	Helen Christoffersen; 1,995	Fred Debrecen (R); 388	Edward Connery
Rupertsland; September 21, 1993	Eric Kennedy; 614	Eric Robinson; 1,697	George Munroe; 1,023		Elijah Harper
Rossmere; September 21, 1993	Ed Martens; 2,159	Harry Schellenberg; 2,990	Sherry Wiebe; 1,590	Cynthia Cooke (Ind); 186	Harold Neufeld
The Maples; September 21, 1993	David Langtry; 1,362	Norma Walker; 2,138	Gary Kowalski; 3,619		Gulzar Singh Cheema
Osborne; September 21, 1993	Roger Young; 1,496	Irene Haigh; 2,420	Norma McCormick; 2,966		Reg Alcock
St. Johns; September 21, 1993	June Robertson; 465	Gord Mackintosh; 3,232	Naty Yankech; 878	Neil Schipper (P); 241	Judy Wasylycia-Leis

Two further vacancies, in Flin Flon (resignation of Jerry Storie, July 20, 1994) and River Heights (Sharon Carstairs appointed to the Senate of Canada, September 15, 1994), were not filled in by-elections before the 1995 election.

== See also ==
- List of Manitoba political parties
- Progressive Conservative Party of Manitoba candidates in the 1990 Manitoba provincial election
