= Mary Richard =

Aboriginal activist and politician (1940–2010)

Mary Richard, OM MSM (June 7, 1940 – September 9, 2010) was an Aboriginal activist and politician in Winnipeg, Manitoba, Canada.

== Life ==
Richard was born to a Métis family in Camperville, Manitoba. She has long been active in promoting language retention, housing, training, cultural awareness and business enterprise among and for Manitoba's aboriginal population. She became the director of the Manitoba Association of Native Languages in the 1980s, and held this position for almost a decade. In 1997, she was appointed by Winnipeg Mayor Susan Thompson to co-chair the North Main Task Force, examining social problems in north Winnipeg's aboriginal community.

She was the first Chief Executive Officer (CEO) of Thunderbird House in north Winnipeg, which opened its doors in 2000. Although this was intended as a tourist destination, it soon became primarily a social outreach centre for the many low-income persons living in the area. Under Richard's leadership, Thunderbird House became active in programs to assist aboriginal youth escape solvent abuse, gang life and the sex trade.

Richard was also a president of the Aboriginal Council of Winnipeg, and a former executive director of the Indian and Métis Friendship Centre of Winnipeg. She also owned the Teepee Restaurant in Winnipeg. In 2000, she was admitted to the Order of Manitoba.

She campaigned for the Progressive Conservative Party of Manitoba in the 1999 provincial election, in the constituency of Point Douglas. Richard's campaign was part of an effort by Gary Filmon's government to increase its profile in the aboriginal community. She received 1224 votes (19.56%), an improvement over previous Conservative candidacies in the area. The winner was George Hickes of the New Democratic Party.

The following year, Richard crossed to the Liberal Party of Canada and ran as that party's candidate in Winnipeg North Centre for the 2000 federal election. In explaining this move, Richard told a Winnipeg Free Press reporter that she had long supported the Progressive Conservatives at the provincial level and the Liberals at the federal level. She received 6,755 votes, finishing second against New Democrat Judy Wasylycia-Leis.

She died on September 9, 2010, while undergoing treatment after a kidney transplant.
