= David Prill =

American author (born 1959)

David Prill (born 1959) is an American author.

== Biography ==
He grew up in Bloomington, Minnesota and graduated in journalism from the University of Minnesota.

David Prill wrote columns for the campus newspaper Minnesota Daily. Alls his novels were published by St. Martin's Press. His first novel The Unnatural was published from St. Martin's Press in 1995. It is a comedy about the embalming business and was winner of the Minnesota Book Awards in the category Fantasy & Science Fiction in 1996. His second novel Serial Killer Days is about a small town in Minnesota celebrating an annual serial killer day. The novel was long listed for a James Tiptree Jr. Award. David Prill's short story The Last Horror Show was nominated for an International Horror Guild Award in 2004.

== Bibliography ==
=== Novels ===
- The Unnatural (1995)
- Serial Killer Days (1996)
- Second Coming Attractions (1998)

=== Short story collections ===
- Dating Secrets of the Dead (2003)
