= Point Douglas =

Provincial electoral district in Manitoba, Canada

Coordinates: 49.906°N 97.128°W

Manitoba electoral district
- Location in Winnipeg

Provincial electoral district
- Legislature: Legislative Assembly of Manitoba
MLA
Bernadette Smith
New Democratic
- District created: 1968
- First contested: 1969
- Last contested: 2023

Demographics
- Population (2016): 23,320
- Electors (2019): 14,186
- Area (km²): 7
- Pop. density (per km²): 3,331.4
- Census division: Division No. 11
- Census subdivision: Winnipeg

Point Douglas is a provincial electoral district in Winnipeg, Manitoba, Canada. It is named for a part of the city that is surrounded by a bend in the Red River. The riding covers the neighbourhoods of William Whyte, Dufferin Industrial, North Point Douglas, Lord Selkirk Park and South Point Douglas plus parts of St. John's Park, St. John's, Inkster-Faraday, Burrows Central, Robertson, Dufferin, Logan C.P.R., Civic Centre, and the Exchange District. It was also Winnipeg's only government supported red light district.

== History ==
The division was created by redistribution for the 1969 provincial election, eliminated in 1978 into Burrows, Logan and St. Johns. It was re-established in 1989 from parts of Burrows, Logan, St. Johns, and a small part of Seven Oaks. It is located in north-central Winnipeg, and includes the Point Douglas neighbourhood.

Point Douglas is bordered to the east by St. Boniface and Elmwood, to the south by Logan, to the north by St. Johns, and to the west by Burrows, Wellington and Minto. Different parts of the division are included in the federal ridings of Winnipeg Centre and Winnipeg North.

Point Douglas is named after Thomas Douglas, the 5th Earl of Selkirk, who established the Red River Colony in 1812. His namesake, twentieth-century politician Tommy Douglas, also lived in the Point Douglas neighbourhood in the early 1910s.

The Manitoba New Democratic Party has won every election in the constituency.

== Demographics ==
Population	19,941 (1996)
Average family income	$24,715 (1999)
Unemployment	25% (1999)
Industries	Manufacturing (25%), Other services (22%) (1999)
Other	Point Douglas has the lowest average family income of any electoral division in the province. Three-quarters of the riding's residences are rented, and 37% of families are single-parent households. The division is ethnically diverse, with significant aboriginal (33%), Filipino (10%) and Ukrainian populations (6%).

Source: 2003 CBC Profile

== Members of the Legislative Assembly ==
Assembly	Years	Member	Party
Riding created from Burrows, St. Johns, Elmwood, Logan and Winnipeg Centre
29th	1969–1973	Donald Malinowski	New Democratic
30th	1973–1977	Donald Malinowski	New Democratic
31st	1977–1981	Donald Malinowski	New Democratic
Riding abolished from 1981-1990
35th	1990–1995	George Hickes	New Democratic
36th	1995–1999	George Hickes	New Democratic
37th	1999–2003	George Hickes	New Democratic
38th	2003–2007	George Hickes	New Democratic
39th	2007–2011	George Hickes	New Democratic
40th	2011–2016	Kevin Chief	New Democratic
41st	2016–2017	Kevin Chief	New Democratic
41st	2017–present	Bernadette Smith	New Democratic
42nd	2019–2023	Bernadette Smith	New Democratic
43rd	2023–present	Bernadette Smith	New Democratic

== Electoral history ==
=== 1990 to present ===
2023 Manitoba general election
Party	Candidate	Votes	%	±%	Expenditures
New Democratic	Bernadette Smith	3,367	73.31	+11.18	$22,793.24
Progressive Conservative	Najiha Ali	742	16.16	+0.49	$0.00
Liberal	Jerald Funk	484	10.54	-1.16	$311.30
Total valid votes/expense limit		4,593	99.46	–	$55,071.00
Total rejected and declined ballots		25	0.54	–	
Turnout		4,618	32.76	-3.24	
Eligible voters		14,097			
New Democratic hold		Swing		+5.35	
Source(s) Source: Elections Manitoba

2019 Manitoba general election
Party	Candidate	Votes	%	±%	Expenditures
New Democratic	Bernadette Smith	3,002	62.13	+17.78	$19,767.20
Progressive Conservative	Michelle Redmond	757	15.67	-0.58	$521.28
Liberal	Richard Sanderson	565	11.69	-17.39	$0.00
Green	Jenn Kess	398	8.24	+3.99	$0.00
Manitoba Forward	Michael Wenuik	66	1.37		$0.00
Communist	Fagie Fainman	44	0.91	+0.07	$310.80
Total valid votes		4,832	100.0		
Total rejected ballots					
Turnout					
Eligible voters					

Manitoba provincial by-election, 13 June 2017 Resignation of Kevin Chief
Party	Candidate	Votes	%	±%	Expenditures
New Democratic	Bernadette Smith	1,568	44.35	-13.46	$35,313.48
Liberal	John Cacayuran	1,006	29.08	+9.62	$19,478.56
Progressive Conservative	Jodi Moskal	562	16.25	-0.27	$35,068.27
Manitoba	Gary Marshall	181	5.23		$5,528.56
Green	Sabrina Koehn Binesi	147	4.25	-0.78	$2,230.86
Communist	Frank Komarniski	27	0.84	-0.34	$9.44
Total valid votes/Expense limit		3,491	100.00	-	$37,179.00
Total rejected and declines votes		23	0.72	-0.45	
Turnout		3,514	32.38	-10.16	
Electors on the lists		11,207			
New Democratic hold		Swing		-11.54	
Source: Elections Manitoba

Results by polling division, 2016

2016 Manitoba general election
Party	Candidate	Votes	%	±%	Expenditures
New Democratic	Kevin Chief	2,839	57.81	-15.47	$24,493.23
Liberal	Althea Guiboche	956	19.47	+14.52	$10,557.41
Progressive Conservative	Marsha Street	811	16.51	-1.14	$9,380.15
Green	Alberteen Spence	247	5.03	+1.64	$0.00
Communist	Frank Komarniski	58	1.18	+0.45	$
Total valid votes/expense limit		4,911	100.00	-	$36,863.00
Total rejected and declines votes		58	1.17	+0.63	
Turnout		4,969	42.53	-1.51	
Registered electors		11,683			
New Democratic hold		Swing		-14.99	
Source: Elections Manitoba

2011 Manitoba general election
Party	Candidate	Votes	%	±%	Expenditures
New Democratic	Kevin Chief	3,806	73.28	+6.92	$18,567.73
Progressive Conservative	John Vernaus	917	17.65	+5.68	$19,915.21
Liberal	Mary Lou Bourgeois	257	4.95	−9.77	$5,383.65
Green	Teresa Pun	176	3.39	−1.92	$17.48
Communist	Darrell Rankin	38	0.73	−0.91	$312.12
Total valid votes		5,194			
Rejected and declined votes		28	0.54	-0.18	
Turnout		5,222	44.04	+3.90	
Electors on the lists		11,858			
New Democratic hold		Swing		+0.62	

^ Change is not based on redistributed results

2007 Manitoba general election
Party	Candidate	Votes	%	±%	Expenditures
New Democratic	George Hickes	2,665	66.36	−8.50	$12,892.59
Liberal	Mary Lou Bourgeois	591	14.72	+0.48	$11,443.44
Progressive Conservative	Alexa Rosentreter	481	11.98	+3.21	$1,180.30
Green	Kristen Andrews	213	5.30	–	$84.55
Communist	Darrell Rankin	66	1.64	−0.49	$373.89
Total valid votes		4,016	100.00		
Rejected and declined ballots		29	0.72	-0.69	
Turnout		4,045	40.14	−0.10	
Electors on the lists		10,077			
New Democratic hold		Swing		-4.49	

2003 Manitoba general election
Party	Candidate	Votes	%	±%	Expenditures
New Democratic	George Hickes	2,877	74.86	+21.52	$10,189.54
Liberal	Mary Lou Bourgeois	547	14.23	−7.12	$7,991.06
Progressive Conservative	Wyatt McIntyre	337	8.77	−10.79	$10.68
Communist	Darrell Rankin	82	2.13		$376.06
Total valid votes		3,843	100.00		
Rejected and declined ballots		55	1.41	+0.48	
Turnout		3,898	40.24	−18.84	
Electors on the lists		9,687			
New Democratic hold		Swing		+14.32	

1999 Manitoba general election
Party	Candidate	Votes	%	±%	Expenditures
New Democratic	George Hickes	3,338	53.34	-9.69	$21,952.00
Liberal	Ajay Chopra	1,336	21.35	-1.71	$21,013.00
Progressive Conservative	Mary Richard	1,224	19.56	+7.79	$20,221.11
Independent	Peter Juba	360	5.75		$2,113.33
Total valid votes		6,258	100.00		
Rejected and declined ballots		59	0.93	-0.17	
Turnout		6,317	59.08	0.85	
Electors on the lists		10,693			
New Democratic hold		Swing		+3.99	

^ Change is not based on redistributed results

1995 Manitoba general election
Party	Candidate	Votes	%	±%	Expenditures
New Democratic	George Hickes	3,095	63.03	+8.32	$15,378.00
Liberal	Linda Cantiveros	1,132	23.05	-7.47	$15,916.74
Progressive Conservative	Claire Riddle	578	11.77	+0.45	$13,389.05
First Peoples Party	Lyle Morrisseau	105	2.14		no report filed
Total valid votes		4,910	100.00		
Rejected and discarded ballots		55	1.11	-0.27	
Turnout		4,965	58.23	-2.70	
Electors on lists		8,527			
New Democratic hold		Swing		+7.90	

1990 Manitoba general election
Party	Candidate	Votes	%	±%
New Democratic	George Hickes	2,778	54.72	
Liberal	Errol Lewis	1,550	30.53	
Progressive Conservative	Calvin Pompana	575	11.33	
Independent	William Hawryluk	108	2.13	
Independent	Roy Price	66	1.30	
Total valid votes		5,077	100.00	
Rejected ballots		71	1.38	
Turnout		5,148	60.92	
Electors on lists		8,450		

=== 1969 to 1981 ===
1977 Manitoba general election
Party	Candidate	Votes	%	±%
New Democratic	Donald Malinowski	3,116	63.32	
Progressive Conservative	Margaret Didenko	915	18.59	
Liberal	Don Marks	769	15.63	
Communist	Harold Dyck	62	1.26	
Social Credit	Peter Stevens	59	1.20	
Total valid votes		4,921	100.00	
Rejected votes		85		
Turnout		5,006	61.10	
Electors on the lists		8,193		

1973 Manitoba general election
Party	Candidate	Votes	%	±%
New Democratic	Donald Malinowski	3,676	65.55	
Independent	Joseph Borowski	1,127	20.10	
Liberal	Lawrence Belanger	569	10.15	
Independent	George Munroe	236	4.21	
Total valid votes		5,608	100.00	
Rejected and discarded votes		100		
Turnout		5,708	65.56	
Electors on the lists		8,706		

1969 Manitoba general election
Party	Candidate	Votes	%	±%
New Democratic	Donald Malinowski	2,253	52.52	
Progressive Conservative	Slaw Rebchuk	1,088	25.36	
Liberal	Roger Garrity	528	12.31	
Communist	Bill Kardash	421	9.81	
Total valid votes		4,290	100.00	
Rejected and discarded votes		62		
Turnout		4,352	46.37	
Electors on the lists		9,385		

All electoral information is taken from Elections Manitoba. Expenditures refer to individual candidate expenses.

== Previous boundaries ==
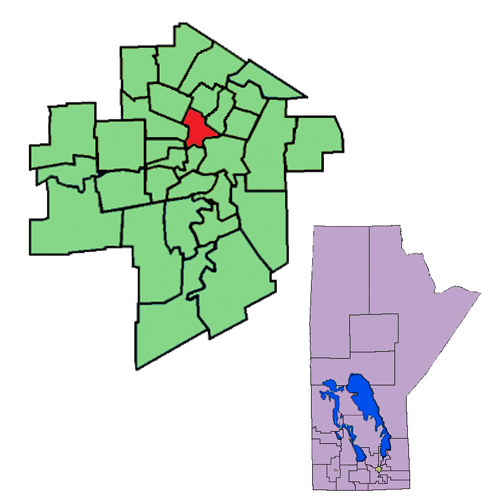
The 1999–2011 boundaries for Point Douglas highlighted in red.

== See also ==
- List of Manitoba provincial electoral districts
- Canadian provincial electoral districts
