= Sagkeeng First Nation =

Sagkeeng Reserve
- Reserve
- Fort Alexander Indian Reserve
- Location within Manitoba
- Coordinates: 50°36′32″N 96°17′44″W
- Country: Canada
- Province: Manitoba
- Census division: Division No. 1

Government
  - Type: Band government (band #262)
  - Chief: E.J. Fontaine

Area
  - Total: 8,771 ha (21,670 acres)

Population (2021)
  - Total: 8,208
  - On reserve: 3,644
  - Off reserve: 4,564
- Website: sagkeeng.ca

The Sagkeeng First Nation (also known as Sagkeeng Anicinabe) is a Treaty-1 First Nation in the Eastman Region of Manitoba, Canada, that is composed of the Anishinaabe people Indigenous to the area at or near the Fort Alexander Indian Reserve #3 (or Fort Alexander) located along the Winnipeg River and Traverse Bay. Today, Sagkeeng holds territory in the southern part of Lake Winnipeg, 120 kilometres (75 mi) north of the city of Winnipeg, and on the mainland.

As of June 2021, the Sagkeeng reserve has a total registered population of 8,208 band members, with over 3,600 members living on the reserve and over 4,500 living off of the reserve. As the reserve is located on both North and South shores at the outlet, or 'mouth', of the Winnipeg River, the name Sagkeeng is derived from the Ojibwe term Zaagiing, meaning 'Mouth of the river'. It is adjacent to the northern border of the Rural Municipality of Alexander, which also borders the town of Pine Falls.

Sagkeeng’s traditional territory includes land within Treaty 1 and lands north and east of the Winnipeg River. The territory of Sagkeeng originally was to have commenced one mile upstream from the Fort Alexander trading post formerly occupied by the Hudson's Bay Company. Files of the federal Crown–Indigenous Relations and Northern Affairs department indicate that the Chief and Council requested the boundaries to be moved to its present location.

== History ==
=== Sagkeeng Anicinabe people ===
The gathering and trading area of what became Fort Alexander were, along with its peoples, a component of the copper culture, as evident by copper points and artifacts that were found in what became the Fort Alexander area. The source of the copper was the Lake Superior copper mines that are thousands of years old.

Some of the Sagkeeng Ojibway people are direct descendants of the Anishinaabe tribes that migrated from a very ancient settlement in the present-day Sault Ste. Marie, Ontario area. Some of the forefathers of Sagkeeng were a component of the ancient copper culture; they brought the copper points and artifacts that have been found around the Fort Alexander fishing, hunting, trading, and meeting grounds.

According to the current Sagkeeng government, Sagkeeng Anishinaabe have lived "at or near the mouth of the Winnipeg river (which became Fort Alexander Reserve #3" and Traverse Bay, since time immemorial." This means that some Sagkeeng forefathers were always from this area and they mixed, married, and traded daughters with Anishinaabe and other native tribes. The Anishinaabe peoples began trading with the first French immigrants just a few hundred years ago in this Fort Alexander area now known as Sagkeeng territory.

=== Fort Alexander ===
In 1734, La Vérendrye built a fur trading post, Fort Maurepas, on the north side of the Winnipeg River, north of present-day Selkirk, Manitoba; which was abandoned at the end of the colonial period. Later Toussaint Lesieur, a North West Company (NWC) clerk, built a post on the south side of the mouth of Lake Winnipeg; it was called Fort Bas de la Rivière and functioned as the capital of the NWC Lake Winnipeg district. It became an important provisioning post for both the Native and immigrant canoe brigades. Bags of pemmican, brought from NWC posts on the upper Assiniboine River, were stored here among other goods.

The Hudson's Bay Company operated here between 1795 and 1801. In 1807, Alexander MacKay rebuilt the post on a nearby site. Beginning in 1808, the new post was known as Fort Alexander (50°36′32″N 96°17′44″W). Since big game of the area had been over exploited by immigrants in the late 1700s, fish, grains, and garden vegetables were the staple foods of the area. By 1812, the Bas de la Rivière gardens were selling vegetables to the incoming Red River immigrants. After the Northwest and Hudson's Bay Companies merged in 1821, Fort Alexander continued to be operated as a trading post for the natives and immigrants in the region.

In 1871, Kakakepenaise (Gekeki-Binesi, 'Hawk-bird', a.k.a. William Mann I) signed Treaty 1 on behalf of the ancestors of the Sagkeeng people. The Fort Alexander Indian Reserve of approximately 87.71 km^{2} (21,674 acres) was surveyed in 1874.

== Treaty ==
Treaty 1 was signed on behalf of the ancestors of the Sagkeeng people in 1871.

While considered a Treaty 1 nation, Sagkeeng is also a member of 3 and Treaty 5, as all three treaty boundaries merge at Sagkeeng. (This also means that it is a member of the Grand Council of Treaty 3, or GCT3.) More specifically, converging at the Sagkeeng Territory are the territory treaty boundaries of the Northern Territory of Turtle Island, the Southern Plains territory, and the Eastern Turtle Island, together encompassing a geographical area of 140,000 km^{2} (55,000 sq mi).

Sagkeeng holds its annual Treaty Days in the last week of July of every year. The five to six days of events are open to everyone and include a community parade, various children's events, a three-day pow wow, and, lastly, fireworks.

The French Oblates of Mary Immaculate ran the Fort Alexander Indian Residential School for Indigenous children. As was typical of the Canadian residential school system at the time, the institution practised cultural genocide by forcing the students to speak English and prohibiting them from practicing their own culture in their own land, thereby creating an ongoing legacy of trauma among the Sagkeeng and other Anishinabe peoples. In 2005, the Government of Canada formally acknowledged and apologized for the abuses of the residential schools. In 2007, it authorized payment of a $1.9-billion compensation package to surviving children who had been forced to attend the schools.

The Sagkeeng and other Indigenous peoples have criticized the government's Child and Family Services (CFS) for breaking up families, rather than working to hold them together by providing support to parents and children.

== Contemporary life ==
The Sagkeeng Anicinabe Government’s current leadership, elected in April 2019, is composed of five elected members as of 2021: Chief Derrick Henderson; and Councillors Lin Dorie, John Courchene, Dylan Courchene, Erin Courchene, Henry Swampy and Tania Twoheart.

The nation has a dance group Sagkeeng's Finest, who, in 2012, won the first and only season of Canada's Got Talent against a total of 244 other acts. The group included Vincent O’Laney (17), and brothers Dallas (16) and Brandon Courchene (18). The trio started with traditional jigging, a First Nations tradition, then fused more modern dance styles, such as tap dancing, into their act. Along with the grand prize of $100,000, they also won a $105,000 Nissan GT-R sports car, an opportunity to perform during Citytv's New Year's Eve special, and the possibility of performing at a venue in Las Vegas.

=== Virginia Fontaine Addictions Foundation scandal ===
On October 18, 2000, the Canadian Press reported that Perry Fontaine, the director of the Virginia Fontaine Addictions Foundation, a Native addictions treatment centre located on Sagkeeng First Nation—and 74 other foundation staff (including CEO Ken Courchene) attended a cruise to the Caribbean that was termed a "staff retreat," which required the then-addictions center be closed.

The cost of this trip was reported later to be over $135,000. Health Canada eventually investigated the financial books of the Centre and found massive fraud and kickback schemes overseen by former Health Canada assistant deputy minister Paul Cochrane and Patrick Nottingham, the ex-regional director of Health Canada’s First Nations and Inuit health programs in Manitoba. Cochrane and Nottingham pleaded guilty in the fall of 2005. Cochrane was formally accused by the RCMPwith one count of breach of trust and seven counts of fraud against the government after more than two years of financial mismanagement at the centre. Nottingham received a conditional sentence of two years less a day and ordered to pay $1.14 million in restitution.

According to the RCMP, Perry Fontaine along with his wife and daughter offered bribes to Cochrane, who accepted a $50,000 payment on 11 December 1996; four season tickets for NHL hockey games in Ottawa in 1998, 1999, and 2000; a blue 1997 Jeep Cherokee sport-utility vehicle in April 1998; a red 1997 Jeep Grand Cherokee in July 1999; a green 2000 Nissan Xterra sport-utility vehicle for his son Lucas Cochrane in May 2000; free trips for Cochrane and his family between July 1999 and October 2000; and two income tax receipts for fake donations of $5,000 each for the years 1997 and 1998. Cochrane's sons were also given cushy, well-paying jobs at the Centre at his insistence.

Fontaine was eventually charged with fraud over $5,000 and sentenced to three years in federal prison.

Sagkeeng First Nation now hosts a family treatment centre, the Sagkeeng Mino Pimatiziwin Family Treatment Centre. The program has been successfully running for a few years. They work with entire families to learn how to work through problems and keep families together.

== Notable citizens ==
- Jerry Fontaine, politician, Chief 1989–1998
- Phil Fontaine, politician, Chief 1973–1977
- Jaimie Isaac, artist and curator
- Sagkeeng's Finest winners of Canada's Got Talent season 1

== See also ==
- Murder of Serena McKay
