= Sondra Prill =

- Born: c.1970
- Genres: Pop
- Occupation: Singer
- Instrument: Vocals
- Years active: 1987–1992

Sondra Prill (born c.1970) is a former cover singer from Tampa, Florida who starred in her own public-access television show, My Show, from 1987 until 1992. Her off-key performances of popular 1980s hits earned her a moderate degree of internet celebrity in the late 2000s when Prill's work was uploaded to the Internet.

== Career ==
In the late 1980s, Prill started her first show on Jones Intercable channel 12 in Tampa. The show, simply titled My Show, featured Prill singing pop music covers in homemade music videos and performing comedy. She would also perform the sign-off of channel 12 by singing "The Star-Spangled Banner" in front of a superimposed American flag, hugging herself and pretending to move in slow motion.

On October 16, 1992 she performed at the Tampa Bay Performing Arts Center starring in her own event called Sultry Sondra: A Musical Fantasy. At a price of $50 a ticket (double the rate established stars Al Green and Patti LaBelle had charged at the same venue), 41 paying attendees came to see her; the official head count put the number of people in attendance closer to 70, with the vice president of marketing for the center concluding, "She might have comped some folks." A reviewer considered that Prill set a new record for "the most abysmal entertainment event to ever take place in the Tampa area", and described her "unique way of handling a melody - a cross between the dulcet sound of setting one's hair on fire and sticking one's hand into a garbage disposal." At the finale of the show, Prill had honey poured all over her, in what seemed to be a literal interpretation of the lyrics to what she believed would be her breakthrough song, "Oh, You Sexpot Honey." Prill wanted to do the finale nude, but the performing arts center required her to wear a body stocking. Brinson M. Harris, a remote producer for the event, said, "A backup singer walked out from backstage to say good night and to apologize to the audience."

Prill's honey-pouring event was videotaped for public-access television, but Prill and her mother are believed to have destroyed the tapes before they made it to air. Three episodes of My Show survive. An attempt to locate Prill in 2007 was unsuccessful.
