= Broadway (electoral district) =

Defunct provincial electoral district in Manitoba, Canada

Broadway is a former provincial electoral district of Manitoba, Canada. It was created in 1989 and eliminated in 1999, with its territory redistributed into the ridings of Wellington, Point Douglas, and Fort Rouge.

Many of Broadway's residents were low-income. Throughout its existence, the riding was represented by Conrad Santos of the New Democratic Party.

After it ceased to exist in 1999, Santos challenged George Hickes for the Point Douglas NDP nomination, but lost, so Santos subsequently ran and was elected in the new division of Wellington.

== Members of the Legislative Assembly ==
| Name | Party | Took office | Left office |
|---|---|---|---|
| Conrad Santos | NDP | 1990 | 1999 |

== See also ==
- List of Manitoba provincial electoral districts
- Canadian provincial electoral districts
