= Sondra Lipton =

American model and painter

Sondra Lipton (1932?-2026) was a former fashion model from New York City, who found a second career as a painter.

== Dancer ==
She attended Julia Richman High School and the School of American Ballet founded by George Balanchine. While a pupil of ballet she danced in several Broadway shows. In May 1948 Lipton was in the dance company of the Experimental Theatre which presented Ballet Ballads as one of a series of events performed at the Maxine Elliott Theatre.

== Fashion Model ==
At 19 she was 5'9" and felt herself too tall to be a dancer. Lipton applied at Christian Dior in New York City, and was quickly noticed by the French couturier. He suggested that she never alter her unusual appearance. She has red hair, amber eyes, an aquiline nose and large teeth. In January 1949 she modelled designs by Fira Benenson at the Pierre Hotel for a New York Heart Association Benefit. In November 1960 she was one of thirteen successful models selected to represent Mannequin, a new modelling agency in New York City. Lipton worked on fashion runways for twenty years. In 1964 she modelled a new religious habit designed by Sybil Connolly at a Sisters of Mercy convention. From Dublin, Ireland, Connolly was one of the most prominent names in international high fashion. She worked on the project for two and a half years.

To relax during her modelling career Lipton began to study sculpture at New York University. Sculptor Joe Eula once loaned her his studio but she began to find sculpting too difficult and lonely.

== Artist ==
In 1969 her husband was Jack Sahlman, a sales representative for California and European dress houses. Lipton was the mother of a 12-year-old son and resided in an East Side (Manhattan) apartment. She began painting in 1963. A typical day for her was spent in her huge double bed, with her oil paints spread out around her. Her still lifes of flowers and fruits were purchased by Mrs. Winthrop Rockefeller, Mrs. Gardner Cowles, Sir David Webster, and movie producer Ross Hunter. President Lyndon Johnson and Lady Bird Johnson received one of Lipton's oils for Christmas in 1968. At an 8th floor gallery of Lord & Taylor twenty of her paintings were displayed at prices ranging from $190 to $300, in 1969.

In 1976 she teamed with former fashion model, Claire Geiman, to design a line of table linens called Dining-In. There were five basic groups among their easy-care cotton collection. One was named Scarboro. Its floral motif featured combinations of lime and blue, terracotta and peach, or chocolate and beige, all with designs in white. Introduced and sold by Lord & Taylor, prices varied from .60 for cocktail napkins to $44 for an 88-inch round cloth.
