= 30th Manitoba Legislature =

The members of the 30th Manitoba Legislature were elected in the Manitoba general election held in June 1973. The legislature sat from January 31, 1974, to September 6, 1977.

The New Democratic Party led by Edward Schreyer formed the government.

Sidney Spivak of the Progressive Conservative Party was Leader of the Opposition. Donald Craik became acting opposition leader in 1976 after Spivak was replaced by Sterling Lyon as party leader; Lyon was elected to the assembly in a by-election held later that year.

In 1976, the Workplace Safety and Health Act was passed; it established standards intended to help keep workers safe and healthy.

Peter Fox served as speaker for the assembly.

There were four sessions of the 30th Legislature:

| Session | Start | End |
|---|---|---|
| 1st | January 31, 1974 | June 14, 1974 |
| 2nd | March 4, 1975 | June 19, 1975 |
| 3rd | February 12, 1976 | June 11, 1976 |
| 4th | February 17, 1977 | June 18, 1977 |

William John McKeag was Lieutenant Governor of Manitoba until March 15, 1976, when Francis Lawrence Jobin became lieutenant governor.

== Members of the Assembly ==
The following members were elected to the assembly in 1973:

| Member | Electoral district | Party | First elected / previously elected | No.# of term(s) | Notes |
|---|---|---|---|---|---|
| J. Douglas Watt | Arthur | Progressive Conservative | 1959 | 5th term | |
| Stephen Patrick | Assiniboia | Liberal | 1962 | 4th term | |
| Harry Graham | Birtle-Russell | Progressive Conservative | 1969 | 3rd term | |
| Leonard Evans | Brandon East | NDP | 1969 | 2nd term | |
| Edward McGill | Brandon West | Progressive Conservative | 1969 | 2nd term | |
| Ben Hanuschak | Burrows | NDP | 1966 | 3rd term | |
| Arthur Moug | Charleswood | Progressive Conservative | 1969 | 2nd term | |
| Les Osland | Churchill | NDP | 1973 | 1st term | |
| Harvey Patterson | Crescentwood (Note: The returning officer cast his vote in favour of Patterson, causing him to win by one vote.) | NDP | 1973 | 1st term | Election overturned February 20, 1975 |
| Warren Steen (1975) | Crescentwood | Progressive Conservative | 1975 | 1st term | From June 25, 1975 |
| Peter Burtniak | Dauphin | NDP | 1969 | 2nd term | |
| Russell Doern | Elmwood | NDP | 1966 | 3rd term | |
| Steve Derewianchuk | Emerson | NDP | 1973 | 1st term | |
| Thomas Barrow | Flin Flon | NDP | 1969 | 2nd term | |
| Bud Sherman | Fort Garry | Progressive Conservative | 1969 | 2nd term | |
| Lloyd Axworthy | Fort Rouge | Liberal | 1973 | 1st term | |
| John Gottfried | Gimli | NDP | 1969 | 2nd term | |
| James Ferguson | Gladstone | Progressive Conservative | 1969 | 2nd term | |
| Sidney Green | Inkster | NDP | 1966 | 3rd term | |
| Peter Fox | Kildonan | NDP | 1966 | 3rd term | |
| Samuel Uskiw | Lac du Bonnet | NDP | 1966 | 3rd term | |
| Harry Enns | Lakeside | Progressive Conservative | 1966 | 3rd term | |
| Robert Banman | La Verendrye | Progressive Conservative | 1973 | 1st term | |
| William Jenkins | Logan | NDP | 1969 | 2nd term | |
| Dave Blake | Minnedosa | Progressive Conservative | 1971 | 2nd term | |
| Warner Jorgenson | Morris | Progressive Conservative | 1969 | 3rd term | |
| Ian Turnbull | Osborne | NDP | 1969 | 2nd term | |
| George Henderson | Pembina | Progressive Conservative | 1969 | 2nd term | |
| Donald Malinowski | Point Douglas | NDP | 1969 | 2nd term | |
| Gordon Johnston | Portage la Prairie | Liberal | 1962 | 4th term | |
| Harry Shafransky | Radisson | NDP | 1969 | 2nd term | |
| Arnold Brown | Rhineland | Progressive Conservative | 1973 | 1st term | |
| Donald Craik | Riel | Progressive Conservative | 1966 | 3rd term | |
| Sidney Spivak | River Heights | Progressive Conservative | 1966 | 3rd term | |
| Wally McKenzie | Roblin | Progressive Conservative | 1966 | 3rd term | |
| Henry Einarson | Rock Lake | Progressive Conservative | 1966 | 3rd term | |
| Edward Schreyer | Rossmere | NDP | 1958, (Note: Brokenhead) 1969 | 5th term* | |
| Harvey Bostrom | Rupertsland | NDP | 1973 | 1st term | |
| Paul Marion | St. Boniface | Liberal | 1973 | 1st term | Election overturned December 20, 1974 |
| Laurent Desjardins (1974) | St. Boniface | NDP | 1959, (Note: First elected as a Liberal Progressive) 1974 | 5th term* | From December 20, 1974 |
| Bill Uruski | St. George | NDP | 1969 | 2nd term | |
| George Minaker | St. James | Progressive Conservative | 1973 | 1st term | |
| Saul Cherniack | St. Johns | NDP | 1962 | 4th term | |
| Wally Johannson | St. Matthews | NDP | 1969 | 2nd term | |
| Jim Walding | St. Vital | NDP | 1971 | 2nd term | |
| Pete Adam | Ste. Rose | NDP | 1971 | 2nd term | |
| Howard Pawley | Selkirk | NDP | 1969 | 2nd term | |
| Saul Miller | Seven Oaks | NDP | 1966 | 3rd term | |
| Malcolm Earl McKellar | Souris-Lansdowne | Progressive Conservative | 1958 | 6th term | Died in office April 18, 1976 |
| Sterling Lyon (1976) | Souris-Lansdowne | Progressive Conservative | 1958, (Note: Fort Garry) 1976 | 5th term* | From November 7, 1976 |
| Rene Toupin | Springfield | NDP | 1969 | 2nd term | |
| Frank Johnston | Sturgeon Creek | Progressive Conservative | 1969 | 2nd term | |
| James Bilton | Swan River | Progressive Conservative | 1962 | 4th term | |
| Ron McBryde | The Pas | NDP | 1969 | 2nd term | |
| Ken Dillen | Thompson | NDP | 1973 | 1st term | |
| Russ Paulley | Transcona | NDP | 1953 | 7th term | |
| Morris McGregor | Virden | Progressive Conservative | 1962 | 4th term | |
| Philip Petursson | Wellington | NDP | 1966 | 3rd term | |
| Bud Boyce | Winnipeg Centre | NDP | 1969 | 3rd term | |
| Izzy Asper | Wolseley | Liberal | 1972 | 2nd term | Until March 1, 1975 |
| Robert Wilson (1975) | Wolseley | Progressive Conservative | 1975 | 1st term | From June 25, 1975 |

== By-elections ==
By-elections were held to replace members for various reasons:

| Electoral district | Member elected | Affiliation | Election date | Reason |
|---|---|---|---|---|
| St. Boniface | Laurent Desjardins | NDP | December 20, 1974 | Election overturned by the Controverted Elections Act |
| Crescentwood | Warren Steen | Progressive Conservative | June 25, 1975 | Election overturned by the Controverted Elections Act |
| Wolseley | Robert Wilson | Progressive Conservative | June 25, 1975 | I Asper resigned March 1, 1975 |
| Souris-Lansdowne | Sterling Lyon | Progressive Conservative | November 7, 1976 | M E McKellar died April 18, 1976 |
