= 31st Manitoba Legislature =

The members of the 31st Manitoba Legislature were elected in the Manitoba general election held in October 1977. The legislature sat from November 24, 1977, to October 13, 1981.

The Progressive Conservative Party led by Sterling Lyon formed the government.

Edward Schreyer of the New Democratic Party was Leader of the Opposition. Howard Pawley became opposition leader in 1979 after Schreyer was named Governor General.

Harry Graham served as speaker for the assembly.

There were five sessions of the 31st Legislature:

Session	Start	End
1st	November 24, 1977	December 12, 1977
2nd	March 16, 1978	July 20, 1978
3rd	February 15, 1979	June 15, 1979
4th	February 21, 1980	July 10, 1980
5th	December 11, 1980	May 20, 1981

Francis Lawrence Jobin was Lieutenant Governor of Manitoba.

== Members of the Assembly ==
The following members were elected to the assembly in 1977:

Member	Electoral district	Party	First elected / previously elected	No.# of term(s)	Notes
James Downey	Arthur	Progressive Conservative	1977	1st term	
Norma Price	Assiniboia	Progressive Conservative	1977	1st term	
Harry Graham	Birtle-Russell	Progressive Conservative	1969	4th term	
Leonard Evans	Brandon East	NDP	1969	3rd term	
Edward McGill	Brandon West	Progressive Conservative	1969	3rd term	
Ben Hanuschak	Burrows	NDP	1966	4th term	Until March 3, 1981
Ben Hanuschak	Burrows	Progressive	1966	4th term	From March 3, 1981
Sterling Lyon	Charleswood	Progressive Conservative	1958, (Note: Fort Garry) 1976	6th term*	
Jay Cowan	Churchill	NDP	1977	1st term	
Warren Steen	Crescentwood	Progressive Conservative	1975	2nd term	
James Galbraith	Dauphin	Progressive Conservative	1977	1st term	
Russell Doern	Elmwood	NDP	1966	4th term	
Albert Driedger	Emerson	Progressive Conservative	1977	1st term	
Thomas Barrow	Flin Flon	NDP	1969	3rd term	
Bud Sherman	Fort Garry	Progressive Conservative	1969	3rd term	
Lloyd Axworthy	Fort Rouge	Liberal	1973	2nd term	Until April 6, 1979
June Westbury (1979)	Fort Rouge	Liberal	1979	1st term	From October 16, 1979
Keith Cosens	Gimli	Progressive Conservative	1977	1st term	
James Ferguson	Gladstone	Progressive Conservative	1969	3rd term	
Sidney Green	Inkster	NDP	1966	4th term	Until December 4, 1979
Sidney Green	Inkster	Independent	1966	4th term	From December 4, 1979 to March 3, 1981
Sidney Green	Inkster	Progressive	1966	4th term	From March 3, 1981
Peter Fox	Kildonan	NDP	1966	4th term	
Samuel Uskiw	Lac du Bonnet	NDP	1966	4th term	
Harry Enns	Lakeside	Progressive Conservative	1966	4th term	
Robert Banman	La Verendrye	Progressive Conservative	1973	2nd term	
William Jenkins	Logan	NDP	1969	3rd term	
Dave Blake	Minnedosa	Progressive Conservative	1971	3rd term	
Warner Jorgenson	Morris	Progressive Conservative	1969	4th term	
Gerald Mercier	Osborne	Progressive Conservative	1977	1st term	
Donald Orchard	Pembina	Progressive Conservative	1977	1st term	
Donald Malinowski	Point Douglas	NDP	1969	3rd term	
Lloyd Hyde	Portage la Prairie	Progressive Conservative	1977	1st term	
Abe Kovnats	Radisson	Progressive Conservative	1977	1st term	
Arnold Brown	Rhineland	Progressive Conservative	1973	2nd term	
Donald Craik	Riel	Progressive Conservative	1966	4th term	
Sidney Spivak	River Heights	Progressive Conservative	1966	4th term	Until April 12, 1979
Gary Filmon (1979)	River Heights	Progressive Conservative	1979	1st term	From October 16, 1979
Wally McKenzie	Roblin	Progressive Conservative	1966	4th term	
Henry Einarson	Rock Lake	Progressive Conservative	1966	4th term	
Edward Schreyer	Rossmere	NDP	1958, (Note: Brokenhead) 1969	6th term*	Until December 7, 1978
Victor Schroeder (1979)	Rossmere	NDP	1979	1st term	From October 16, 1979
Harvey Bostrom	Rupertsland	NDP	1973	2nd term	
Laurent Desjardins	St. Boniface	NDP	1959, (Note: First elected as a Liberal Progressive) 1974	6th term*	
Bill Uruski	St. George	NDP	1969	3rd term	
George Minaker	St. James	Progressive Conservative	1973	2nd term	
Saul Cherniack	St. Johns	NDP	1962	5th term	
Len Domino	St. Matthews	Progressive Conservative	1977	1st term	
Jim Walding	St. Vital	NDP	1971	3rd term	
Pete Adam	Ste. Rose	NDP	1971	3rd term	
Howard Pawley	Selkirk	NDP	1969	3rd term	
Saul Miller	Seven Oaks	NDP	1966	4th term	
Brian Ransom	Souris-Lansdowne	Progressive Conservative	1977	1st term	
Bob Anderson	Springfield	Progressive Conservative	1977	1st term	
Frank Johnston	Sturgeon Creek	Progressive Conservative	1969	3rd term	
Douglas Gourlay	Swan River	Progressive Conservative	1977	1st term	
Ron McBryde	The Pas	NDP	1969	3rd term	
Ken MacMaster	Thompson	Progressive Conservative	1977	1st term	
Wilson Parasiuk	Transcona	NDP	1977	1st term	
Morris McGregor	Virden	Progressive Conservative	1962	5th term	
Brian Corrin	Wellington	NDP	1977	1st term	
Bud Boyce	Winnipeg Centre	NDP	1969	3rd term	Until March 3, 1981
Bud Boyce	Winnipeg Centre	Progressive	1969	3rd term	From March 3, 1981
Robert Wilson	Wolseley	Progressive Conservative	1975	2nd term	Until November 20, 1980
Robert Wilson	Wolseley	Independent	1975	2nd term	From November 20, 1980

== By-elections ==
By-elections were held to replace members for various reasons:

Electoral district	Member elected	Affiliation	Election date	Reason
Fort Rouge	June Westbury	Liberal	October 16, 1979	L Axworthy resigned April 6, 1979, to run for federal seat
River Heights	Gary Filmon	Progressive Conservative	October 16, 1979	S Spivak resigned April 12, 1979 to run for federal seat
Rossmere	Victor Schroeder	NDP	October 16, 1979	E Schreyer resigned December 7, 1978, to become Governor General
