= 29th Manitoba Legislature =

Legislature of Manitoba, 1969–1973

The members of the 29th Manitoba Legislature were elected in the Manitoba general election held in June 1969. The legislature sat from August 14, 1969, to May 25, 1973.

The New Democratic Party led by Edward Schreyer formed the government.

Walter Weir of the Progressive Conservative Party was Leader of the Opposition. Sidney Spivak became opposition leader after Weir retired as leader in 1971.

Ben Hanuschak served as speaker for the assembly until August 1970. Peter Fox succeeded Hanuschak as speaker in 1971.

There were five sessions of the 29th Legislature:

| Session | Start | End |
|---|---|---|
| 1st | August 14, 1969 | October 10, 1969 |
| 2nd | March 12, 1970 | August 13, 1970 |
| 3rd | April 7, 1971 | July 27, 1971 |
| 4th | March 9, 1972 | July 20, 1972 |
| 5th | February 22, 1973 | May 25, 1973 |

Richard Spink Bowles was Lieutenant Governor of Manitoba until September 2, 1970, when William John McKeag became lieutenant governor.

== Members of the Assembly ==
The following members were elected to the assembly in 1969:

| Member | Electoral district | Party | First elected / previously elected | No.# of term(s) | Notes |
|---|---|---|---|---|---|
| J. Douglas Watt | Arthur | Progressive Conservative | 1959 | 4th term | |
| Stephen Patrick | Assiniboia | Liberal | 1962 | 3rd term | |
| Harry Graham | Birtle-Russell | Progressive Conservative | 1969 | 2nd term | |
| Leonard Evans | Brandon East | NDP | 1969 | 1st term | |
| Edward McGill | Brandon West | Progressive Conservative | 1969 | 1st term | |
| Ben Hanuschak | Burrows | NDP | 1966 | 2nd term | |
| Arthur Moug | Charleswood | Progressive Conservative | 1969 | 1st term | |
| Gordon Beard | Churchill | Independent | 1962, (Note: First elected as a Progressive Conservative) 1969 | 3rd term* | |
| Cy Gonick | Crescentwood | NDP | 1969 | 1st term | |
| Peter Burtniak | Dauphin | NDP | 1969 | 1st term | |
| Russell Doern | Elmwood | NDP | 1966 | 2nd term | |
| Gabriel Girard | Emerson | Progressive Conservative | 1969 | 1st term | |
| Thomas Barrow | Flin Flon | NDP | 1969 | 1st term | |
| Bud Sherman | Fort Garry | Progressive Conservative | 1969 | 1st term | |
| Inez Trueman | Fort Rouge | Progressive Conservative | 1969 | 1st term | |
| John Gottfried | Gimli | NDP | 1969 | 1st term | |
| James Ferguson | Gladstone | Progressive Conservative | 1969 | 1st term | |
| Sidney Green | Inkster | NDP | 1966 | 2nd term | |
| Peter Fox | Kildonan | NDP | 1966 | 2nd term | |
| Samuel Uskiw | Lac du Bonnet | NDP | 1966 | 2nd term | |
| Harry Enns | Lakeside | Progressive Conservative | 1966 | 2nd term | |
| Leonard Barkman | La Verendrye | Liberal | 1962 | 3rd term | |
| William Jenkins | Logan | NDP | 1969 | 1st term | |
| Walter Weir | Minnedosa | Progressive Conservative | 1959 | 4th term | Until September 1971 |
| Dave Blake (1971) | Minnedosa | Progressive Conservative | 1971 | 1st term | From November 16, 1971 |
| Warner Jorgenson | Morris | Progressive Conservative | 1969 | 2nd term | |
| Ian Turnbull | Osborne | NDP | 1969 | 1st term | |
| George Henderson | Pembina | Progressive Conservative | 1969 | 1st term | |
| Donald Malinowski | Point Douglas | NDP | 1969 | 1st term | |
| Gordon Johnston | Portage la Prairie | Liberal | 1962 | 3rd term | |
| Harry Shafransky | Radisson | NDP | 1969 | 1st term | |
| Jacob Froese | Rhineland | Social Credit | 1959 | 4th term | |
| Donald Craik | Riel | Progressive Conservative | 1966 | 2nd term | |
| Sidney Spivak | River Heights | Progressive Conservative | 1966 | 2nd term | |
| Wally McKenzie | Roblin | Progressive Conservative | 1966 | 2nd term | |
| Henry Einarson | Rock Lake | Progressive Conservative | 1966 | 2nd term | |
| Edward Schreyer | Rossmere | NDP | 1958, (Note: Brokenhead) 1969 | 4th term* | |
| Jean Allard | Rupertsland | NDP | 1969 | 1st term | Until April 7, 1972 |
| Jean Allard | Rupertsland | Independent | 1969 | 1st term | From April 7, 1972 |
| Laurent Desjardins | St. Boniface | Liberal | 1959 | 4th term | Until July 8, 1969 |
| Laurent Desjardins | St. Boniface | Independent | 1959 | 4th term | From July 8, 1969 to December 1, 1971 |
| Laurent Desjardins | St. Boniface | NDP | 1959 | 4th term | From December 1, 1971 |
| Bill Uruski | St. George | NDP | 1969 | 1st term | |
| Al Mackling | St. James | NDP | 1969 | 1st term | |
| Saul Cherniack | St. Johns | NDP | 1962 | 3rd term | |
| Wally Johannson | St. Matthews | NDP | 1969 | 1st term | |
| Jack Hardy | St. Vital | Progressive Conservative | 1969 | 1st term | Until February 16, 1971 |
| Jim Walding (1971) | St. Vital | NDP | 1971 | 1st term | From April 5, 1971 |
| Gildas Molgat | Ste. Rose | Liberal | 1953 | 6th term | Until October 7, 1970 |
| Aime Adam (1971) | Ste. Rose | NDP | 1971 | 1st term | From April 5, 1971 |
| Howard Pawley | Selkirk | NDP | 1969 | 1st term | |
| Saul Miller | Seven Oaks | NDP | 1966 | 2nd term | |
| Malcolm Earl McKellar | Souris-Killarney | Progressive Conservative | 1958 | 5th term | |
| Rene Toupin | Springfield | NDP | 1969 | 1st term | |
| Frank Johnston | Sturgeon Creek | Progressive Conservative | 1969 | 1st term | |
| James Bilton | Swan River | Progressive Conservative | 1962 | 3rd term | |
| Ron McBryde | The Pas | NDP | 1969 | 1st term | |
| Joseph Borowski | Thompson | NDP | 1969 | 2nd term | Until June 25, 1972 |
| Joseph Borowski | Thompson | Independent | 1969 | 2nd term | From June 25, 1972 |
| Russ Paulley | Transcona | NDP | 1953 | 6th term | |
| Morris McGregor | Virden | Progressive Conservative | 1962 | 3rd term | |
| Philip Petursson | Wellington | NDP | 1966 | 2nd term | |
| Bud Boyce | Winnipeg Centre | NDP | 1969 | 1st term | |
| Leonard Claydon | Wolseley | Progressive Conservative | 1969 | 2nd term | Died in office December 8, 1971 |
| Israel Asper (1972) | Wolseley | Liberal | 1972 | 1st term | From June 16, 1972 |

== By-elections ==
By-elections were held to replace members for various reasons:

| Electoral district | Member elected | Affiliation | Election date | Reason |
|---|---|---|---|---|
| St. Vital | Jim Walding | NDP | April 5, 1971 | J Hardy retired February 16, 1971 |
| Ste. Rose | Aime Adam | NDP | April 5, 1971 | G Molgat resigned October 7, 1970 |
| Minnedosa | Dave Blake | Progressive Conservative | November 16, 1971 | W Weir resigned September 1971 |
| Wolseley | Israel Asper | Liberal | June 16, 1972 | L Claydon died December 8, 1971 |
