= 1973 Manitoba general election =

- June 28, 1973

57 seats of the Legislative Assembly of Manitoba 29 seats were needed for a majority
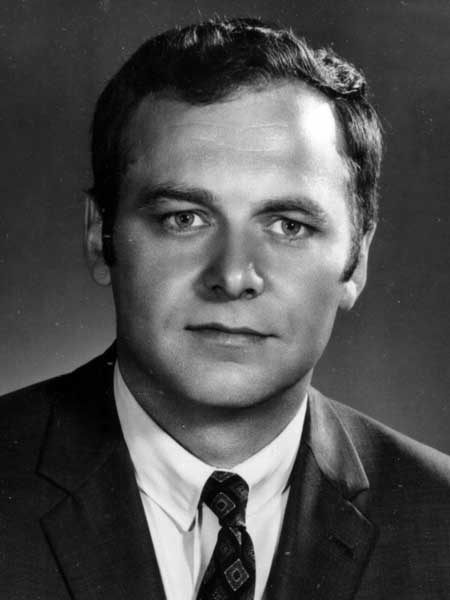
	First party	Second party	Third party
		PC	LIB
Leader	Edward Schreyer	Sidney Spivak	Izzy Asper
Party	New Democratic	Progressive Conservative	Liberal
Leader since	June 7, 1969	February 27, 1971	October 31, 1970
Leader's seat	Rossmere	River Heights	Wolseley
Last election	28	22	5
Seats won	31	21	5
Seat change	▲3	▼1	0
Popular vote	197,585	171,553	88,907
Percentage	42.31%	36.73%	19.04%
Swing	▲4.04pp	▲1.17pp	▼4.95pp
- Map of Election Results
Premier before election
Edward Schreyer
New Democratic
Premier after election
Edward Schreyer
New Democratic

The 1973 Manitoba general election was held on June 28, 1973 to elect Members of the Legislative Assembly of the Province of Manitoba, Canada. It was won by the social-democratic New Democratic Party, which took 31 of 57 seats to win government in its own right for the first time. The Progressive Conservative Party finished second with 21, while the Manitoba Liberal Party took the remaining five. The Manitoba Social Credit Party lost its only seat.

A right-of-centre municipal organization known as the Independent Citizens' Election Committee tried to convince the Progressive Conservative and Liberal parties to avoid competing against each other in certain Winnipeg-area ridings, such that a single "anti-socialist" alternative to the NDP could be offered. This campaign was generally unsuccessful.

== Results ==
Party	Party Leader	# of candidates	Seats			Popular Vote		
Party	Party Leader	# of candidates	1969	Elected	% Change	#	%	Change
New Democratic	Edward Schreyer	57	28	31	+10.7%	197,585	42.31%	+4.04
Progressive Conservative	Sidney Spivak	52	22	21	-4.5%	171,553	36.73%	+1.17
Liberal	Israel Asper	50	5	5	-	88,907	19.04%	-4.95
Social Credit	Jacob Froese	3	1	-	-100%	1,709	0.37%	-0.99
Communist	William Cecil Ross	3	-	-	-	252	0.05%	-0.17
Marxist–Leninist		3	-	-	-	69	0.01%	+0.01
Independent		18	1	-	-100%	6,969	1.49%	+0.89
Total		186	57	57		467,044	100%	

Note:

* Party did not nominate candidates in previous election.

Popular vote
New Democratic	42.31%
PC	36.73%
Liberal	19.04%
Others	1.92%

Seats summary
New Democratic	54.39%
PC	36.84%
Liberal	8.77%

== Riding results ==
Party key:

- PC: Progressive Conservative Party of Manitoba
- L: Manitoba Liberal Party
- NDP: New Democratic Party of Manitoba
- SC: Manitoba Social Credit Party
- Comm: Communist Party of Canada - Manitoba
- (M-L): Communist Party of Canada – Marxist-Leninist
- Ind: Independent

Arthur:

- (incumbent) Douglas Watt (PC) 3487
- Lorne Watt (NDP) 1981
- M.F. Mac Corbett (L) 1181

Assiniboia:

- (incumbent) Stephen Patrick (L) 5105
- Norma Price (PC) 4309
- Larry Iwan (NDP) 3029

Birtle-Russell:

- (incumbent) Harry Graham (PC) 3203
- Michael Sotas (NDP) 2967
- John Braendle (L) 685

Brandon East:

- (incumbent) Leonard Evans (NDP) 4123
- Ken Burgess (PC) 2912
- Terry Penton (L) 855
- John Gross (SC) 78

Brandon West:

- (incumbent) Edward McGill (PC) 5070
- Henry Carroll (NDP) 4028
- Guy Savoie (L) 806

Burrows:

- (incumbent) Ben Hanuschak (NDP) 5277
- Doug Krochak (PC) 1044
- Bob Major (L) 741
- Mary Kardash (Comm) 108
- Glen Brown (M-L) 33

Charleswood:

- (incumbent) Arthur Moug (PC) 6180
- Roy Neil Benson (NDP) 3554
- Jim Spencer (L) 3456

Churchill:

- Les Osland (NDP) 2041
- Andy Champagne (PC) 1367
- Walter Perepeluk (L) 1256
- Andrew Kirkness (Ind) 880

Crescentwood:

- Harvey Patterson (NDP) 3730
- Lawrie Pollard (PC) 3729
- June Menzies (L) 1734

Dauphin:

- (incumbent) Peter Burtniak (NDP) 4261
- Art Rampton (PC) 3262
- Hugh Dunlop (L) 1091

Elmwood:

- (incumbent) Russell Doern (NDP) 4987
- Edward Tymchuk (PC) 2361
- Ray Brunka (L) 1363

Emerson:

- Steve Derewianchuk (NDP) 2374
- Garnet Kyle (PC) 1937
- Mark Smerchanski (L) 1768
- Walter Hoover (Ind) 83

Flin Flon:

- (incumbent) Thomas Barrow (NDP) 3112
- George Njegovan (PC) 1803
- Roy Veness (L) 893

Fort Garry:

- (incumbent) L.R. Bud Sherman (PC) 4783
- Henry Janzen (L) 4331
- C.G. Gifford (NDP) 4006

Fort Rouge:

- Lloyd Axworthy (L) 4181
- Samia Friesen (NDP) 3614
- (incumbent) Inez Trueman (PC) 3531
- Lane McDonald (Ind) 131

Gimli:

- (incumbent) John Gottfried (NDP) 3546
- Ted Revel (PC) 3490
- Charles Arnason (Ind) 164

Gladstone:

- (incumbent) James Ferguson (PC) 3605
- Gordon Stewart (NDP) 2394
- Gordon McPhail (L) 1698
- Kenneth Morrison (Ind) 106

Inkster:

- (incumbent) Sidney Green (NDP) 5442
- John Sulymko (L) 1686
- Joe McMullen (PC) 1622
- Don Currie (Comm) 78
- Aili Waldman (M-L) 12

Kildonan:

- (incumbent) Peter Fox (NDP) 5718
- Don Lynn Heidman (PC) 2660
- Ann McTavish (L) 2097

Lac Du Bonnet:

- (incumbent) Samuel Uskiw (NDP) 5461
- Jo Anne Hillier (L) 2244

Lakeside:

- (incumbent) Harry Enns (PC) 2969
- George Schreyer (NDP) 1793
- Alan Beachell (L) 1778

La Verendrye:

- Robert Banman (PC) 2912
- (incumbent) Leonard Barkman (L) 2387
- Roger Smith (NDP) 1514

Logan:

- (incumbent) William Jenkins (NDP) 2671
- Rita Servin (PC) 1582
- Andrew Mazur (L) 644
- William Hawryluk (Ind) 671
- Gordon Anderson (Ind) 48

Minnedosa:

- (incumbent) Dave Blake (PC) 3777
- Lawrence Bell (NDP) 2708
- Ed Turner (L) 739

Morris:

- (incumbent) Warner Jorgenson (PC) 3650
- Lawrence Lewco (NDP) 1602
- Norm Dashevsky (L) 825

Osborne:

- (incumbent) Ian Turnbull (NDP) 3945
- June Westbury (L) 2347
- Ted Speers (PC) 2344

Pembina:

- (incumbent) George Henderson (PC) 4408
- Robert McKenzie (L) 1553
- Paul Klassen (NDP) 1013

1973 Manitoba general election: Point Douglas
Party	Candidate	Votes	%	±%
New Democratic	Donald Malinowski	3,676	65.55	
Independent	Joseph Borowski	1,127	20.10	
Liberal	Lawrence Belanger	569	10.15	
Independent	George Munroe	236	4.21	
Total valid votes		5,608	100.00	
Rejected and discarded votes		100		
Turnout		5,708	65.56	
Electors on the lists		8,706		

Portage la Prairie:

- (incumbent) Gordon Johnston (L) 2628
- George Fairfield (PC) 2592
- Albert Barrett (NDP) 1933

Radisson:

- (incumbent) Harry Shafransky (NDP) 4267
- Abe Kovnats (PC) 3635
- D'Arcy Pagan (L) 1740

Rhineland:

- Arnold Brown (PC) 2903
- (incumbent) Jacob Froese (SC) 1587
- Jake Heinrichs (NDP) 1002
- Harry Friesen (L) 578
- John Epp (Ind) 52

Riel:

- (incumbent) Donald Craik (PC) 7944
- Wilson Parasiuk (NDP) 6181
- Art Gill (L) 1782

River Heights:

- (incumbent) Sidney Spivak (PC) 5167
- Charles Huband (L) 2906
- Muriel Smith (NDP) 1413

Roblin:

- (incumbent) Wally McKenzie (PC) 3388
- John Oldham (NDP) 2779

Rock Lake:

- (incumbent) Henry Einarson (PC) 3470
- Paul Cenerini (NDP) 1825
- Arnold Collins (L) 1361

Rossmere:

- (incumbent) Edward Schreyer (NDP) 6827
- Alfred Penner (PC) 6239

Rupertsland:

- Harvey Bostrom (NDP) 2093
- John Ateah (L) 1329
- Raymond Guiboche (PC) 504
- Dave Courchene Jr. (Ind) 415
- Lorne Lester (Ind) 166

St. Boniface:

- J. Paul Marion (L) 4301
- (incumbent) Laurent Desjardins (NDP) 4300

St. George:

- (incumbent) Bill Uruski (NDP) 3552
- Elman Guttormson (L) 2465

St. James:

- George Minaker (PC) 4483
- (incumbent) Alvin Mackling (NDP) 4109
- Michael Scholl (L) 1340
- Gerald Zucawich (Ind) 30

St. Johns:

- (incumbent) Saul Cherniack (NDP) 4519
- Murray Krovats (PC) 1686
- Ben Karasinski (L) 1061
- William Cecil Ross (Comm) 66
- Joe Smith (Ind) 45
- Diane Waldman (M-L) 24

St. Matthews:

- (incumbent) Wally Johannson (NDP) 3875
- Einar Arnason (PC) 2492
- Norm Kirton (L) 1365

17.80
1973 Manitoba general election: St. Vital
Party	Candidate	Votes	%	±%
New Democratic	Jim Walding	3,870	39.25	+3.56
Liberal	Dan Kennedy	3,765	38.18	+9.87
Progressive Conservative	John Gee	2,225	22.57	−13.44
Total valid votes		9,860	100.00	
Rejected votes		51		
Turnout		9,911	85.84	
Electors on the lists		11,546		
New Democratic hold		Swing		-3.15

Ste. Rose:

- (incumbent) A.R. Pete Adam (NDP) 2627
- Dwight Hopfner (L) 1748
- Alf O'Loughlin (PC) 1516

Selkirk:

- (incumbent) Howard Pawley (NDP) 4745
- John Linney (PC) 3429

Seven Oaks:

- (incumbent) Saul Miller (NDP) 6579
- Carl Zawatsky (PC) 4921
- Henry Froese (L) 1386

Souris-Killarney:

- (incumbent) Earl McKellar (PC) 4669
- John Bucklaschuk (NDP) 1557
- Gordon Martin (L) 890

Springfield:

- (incumbent) Rene Toupin (NDP) 3611
- John Vaags (PC) 3245
- Len Mendes (L) 694
- Harry Meronek (Ind) 333

Sturgeon Creek:

- (incumbent) Frank Johnston (PC) 6467
- Laverne Lewycky (NDP) 2924
- Marjorie Gillies (L) 1647
- Dale Hibbard (Ind) 54

Swan River:

- (incumbent) James Bilton (PC) 3370
- Omar Lamb (NDP) 2669
- Vic Mearon (L) 687

The Pas:

- (incumbent) Ron McBryde (NDP) 3673
- George Takashima (Ind) 1873

1973 Manitoba general election: Thompson
Party	Candidate	Votes	%
New Democratic	Ken Dillen	2,742	37.54
Progressive Conservative	Anna Denby	2,480	33.95
Liberal	Blain Johnston	2,083	28.51
Total valid votes		7,305	100.00
Rejected votes		33	
Turnout		7,338	71.30
Electors on the lists		10,292	

Transcona:

- (incumbent) Russell Paulley (NDP) 6275
- Phil Rizzuto (PC) 4151

Virden:

- (incumbent) Morris McGregor (PC) 2981
- Barry Forman (NDP) 1741
- Duncan McDonald (L) 911

Wellington:

- (incumbent) Philip Petursson (NDP) 4190
- Brandson Thornson (PC) 2272
- Neil Baker (Ind) 1165

Winnipeg Centre:

- (incumbent) Bud Boyce (NDP) 3010
- Bob Wilson (PC) 1520
- Ken Arenson (L) 1092
- Ed Storozuk (SC) 44

Wolseley:

- (incumbent) Israel Asper (L) 3135
- Murdoch MacKay (NDP) 3131
- Robert Steen (PC) 1807

=== Post-election changes ===
St. Boniface (election declared void), December 20, 1974:

- Laurent Desjardins (NDP) 3711
- J. Paul Marion (L) 3092
- Paul Fredette (PC) 378

Wolseley (res. Israel Asper, March 1, 1975), June 25, 1975:

- Robert Wilson (PC) 2072
- D'Arcy McCaffery (L) 1870
- Murdoch MacKay (NDP) 1815
- J.M.A. Smith (Ind) 55

Crescentwood (election declared void, February 20, 1975), June 25, 1975:

- Warren Steen (PC) 2780
- Charles Huband (L) 2611
- Harvey Patterson (NDP) 1987

Souris-Killarney (dec. Earl McKellar, April 18, 1976), November 7, 1976:

- Sterling Lyon (PC) 4478
- Jean Strath (L) 1272
- Howard Nixon (NDP) 1073

== See also ==
- List of Manitoba political parties

Preceded by 1969 Manitoba election	List of Manitoba elections	Succeeded by 1977 Manitoba election
