= Manitoba Liberal Party candidates in the 1977 Manitoba provincial election =

The Manitoba Liberal Party field many candidates in the 1977 federal election. One of its candidates was elected: Lloyd Axworthy, later a federal cabinet minister. The party's leader, Charles Huband, was defeated in his constituency.

Some candidates have their own biography pages; information about others may be found on this page.

== Norman Stapon (Kildonan) ==
Norman Stapon was a member of Winnipeg City Council from 1971 to 1977. He was first elected for Springfield Heights in 1971 as a candidate of the Independent Citizens' Election Committee, and was re-elected in 1974. He did not seek re-election in 1977. Stapon attempted to return to city council in 1989, but was defeated.

Electoral record
Election	Division	Party	Votes	%	Place	Winner
1971 municipal election	Council, Springfield Heights	Independent Citizens' Election Committee	2,731		1/3	himself
1974 municipal election	Council, Springfield Heights	Independent Citizens' Election Committee	1,848		1/2	himself
1977 provincial election	Kildonan	Liberal	929		3/3	Peter Fox, New Democratic Party
1974 municipal election	Council, Springfield Heights	n/a	890	21.56	2/3	Shirley Timm-Rudolph

== Don Marks (Point Douglas) ==
Don Marks received 769 votes (15.63%), finishing third against New Democrat Don Malinowski. He later became a noted writer, director and producer.
