= 1977 Manitoba general election =

- October 11, 1977

57 seats of the Legislative Assembly of Manitoba 29 seats were needed for a majority
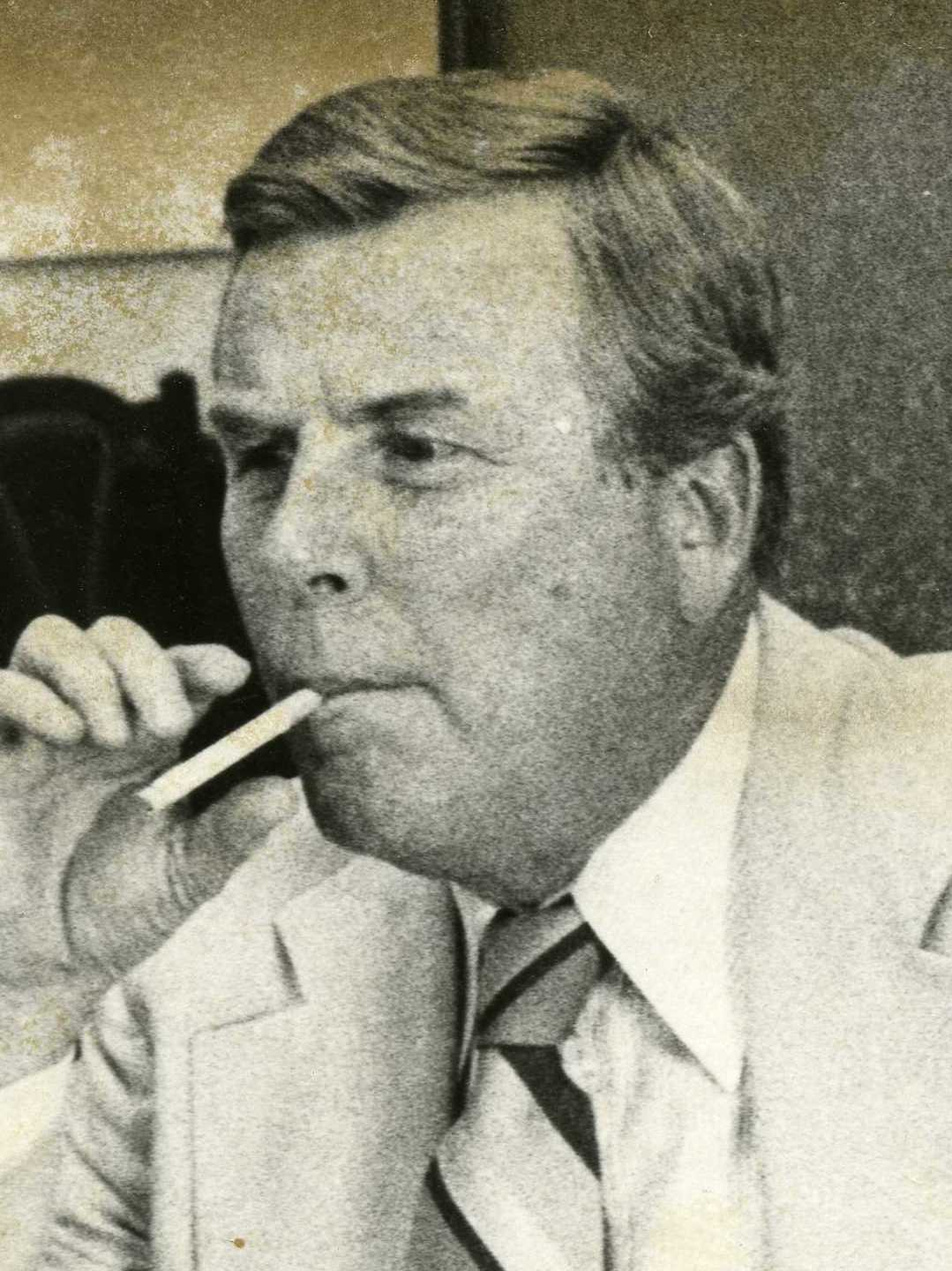

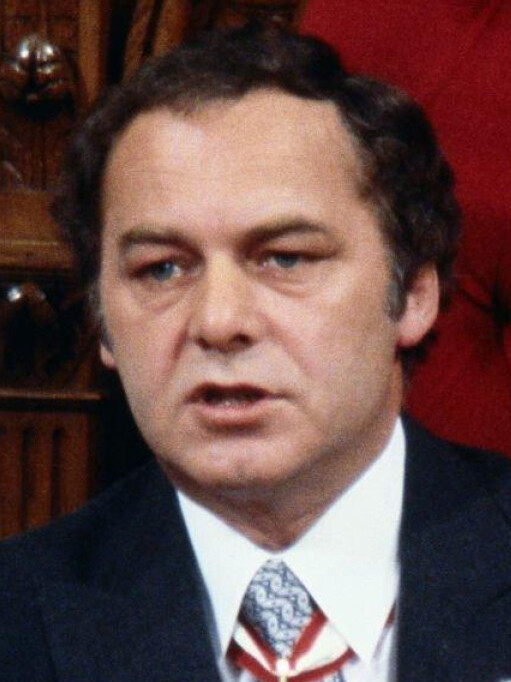
	First party	Second party	Third party
			LIB
Leader	Sterling Lyon	Edward Schreyer	Charles Huband
Party	Progressive Conservative	New Democratic	Liberal
Leader since	December 6, 1975	June 7, 1969	February 22, 1975
Leader's seat	Charleswood	Rossmere	Ran in Crescentwood (lost)
Last election	21	31	5
Seats won	33	23	1
Seat change	▲12	▼8	▼4
Popular vote	237,496	188,124	59,865
Percentage	48.75%	38.62%	12.29%
Swing	▲12.02pp	▼3.69pp	▼6.75pp
- Map of Election Results
Premier before election
Edward Schreyer
New Democratic
Premier after election
Sterling Lyon
Progressive Conservative

The 1977 Manitoba general election was held on October 11, 1977, to elect Members of the Legislative Assembly of the Province of Manitoba, Canada. It was won by the Progressive Conservative Party, which took 33 seats out of 57. The governing New Democratic Party fell to 23 seats, while the Liberal Party won only one seat.

== Results ==
Party	Party Leader	# of candidates	Seats			Popular Vote		
Party	Party Leader	# of candidates	1973	Elected	% Change	#	%	Change
Progressive Conservative	Sterling Lyon	57	21	33	+57.1%	237,496	48.75%	+12.02
New Democratic	Edward Schreyer	57	31	23	-25.8%	188,124	38.62%	-3.69
Liberal	Charles Huband	53	5	1	-80.0%	59,865	12.29%	-6.75
Social Credit	Jacob Froese	5	-	-	-	1,323	0.27%	-0.10
Communist	William Cecil Ross	4	-	-	-	299	0.06%	+0.01
Revolutionary Workers		1	*	–	*	47	0.01%	*
Independent		-	1	-	-100%	-	-	-1.49
Total		177	57	57	-	487,154	100%	

Note:

* Party did not nominate candidates in previous election.

Popular vote
PC	48.75%
New Democratic	38.62%
Liberal	12.29%
Others	0.34%

Seats summary
PC	57.89%
New Democratic	40.35%
Liberal	1.75%

== Riding results ==
Party key:

- PC: Progressive Conservative Party of Manitoba
- L: Manitoba Liberal Party
- NDP: New Democratic Party of Manitoba
- SC: Manitoba Social Credit Party
- Comm: Communist Party of Canada - Manitoba
- RWL: Revolutionary Workers League
- WDP: Western Democracy Party (see by-elections)
- M-L: Marxist–Leninist Party of Canada - Manitoba (see by-elections)
- Ind: Independent

Arthur:

- James Downey (PC) 2280
- Earl Sterling (NDP) 1172
- Murray Lee (L) 901

Assiniboia:

- Norma Price (PC) 7863
- (incumbent)Stephen Patrick (L) 4271
- Max Melnyk (NDP) 2106

Birtle-Russell:

- (incumbent)Harry Graham (PC) 3058
- Peter Merry (NDP) 2608
- Doug MacIsaac (L) 1169

Brandon East:

- (incumbent)Leonard Evans (NDP) 4217
- James Thornborough (PC) 3195
- James Manishen (L) 558

Brandon West:

- (incumbent)Edward McGill (PC) 5680
- Henry Carroll (NDP) 4601
- Phil Cels (L) 807
- John Gross (SC) 107

Burrows:

- (incumbent)Ben Hanuschak (NDP) 4103
- Ken Alyluia (PC) 1688
- Anne Percheson (L) 490

Charleswood:

- (incumbent)Sterling Lyon (PC) 10559
- Maureen Hemphill (NDP) 4216
- Beverly Riley (L) 1493

Churchill:

- Jay Cowan (NDP) 2280
- Mark Ingebrigtson (PC) 1992
- Andrew Kirkness (L) 1140

Crescentwood:

- (incumbent)Warren Steen (PC) 3253
- Muriel Smith (NDP) 3181
- Charles Huband (L) 2702

Dauphin:

- James Galbraith (PC) 4590
- (incumbent)Peter Burtniak (NDP) 4330

Elmwood:

- (incumbent)Russell Doern (NDP) 4136
- Ken Gunn-Walberg (PC) 3282
- Ken Vincent (L) 675

Emerson:

- Albert Driedger (PC) 3125
- (incumbent)Steve Derewianchuk (NDP) 2153
- Gabriel Catellier (L) 1439

Flin Flon:

- (incumbent)Thomas Barrow (NDP) 2917
- Nyall Hyndman (PC) 2522
- Walter Shmon (L) 309

Fort Garry:

- (incumbent)Bud Sherman (PC) 10052
- Ruth Pear (NDP) 4157
- Beth Candlish (L) 2423

Fort Rouge:

- (incumbent)Lloyd Axworthy (L) 4153
- Julian Hugh McDonald (PC) 3486
- Ermano Barone (NDP) 2863

Gimli:

- Keith Cosens (PC) 4515
- George Schreyer (NDP) 3795

Gladstone:

- (incumbent)James Ferguson (PC) 4635
- William Werbiski (NDP) 2151
- Sid Lachter (L) 662

Inkster:

- (incumbent)Sidney Green (NDP) 5175
- Barrie Jones (PC) 2711
- Barry Krawchuk (L) 934

Kildonan:

- (incumbent)Peter Fox (NDP) 5658
- James Hanson (PC) 4651
- Norman Stapon (L) 929

Lac Du Bonnet:

- (incumbent)Sam Uskiw (NDP) 5037
- John Vaags (PC) 3795
- Robert Dyne (L) 515

Lakeside:

- (incumbent)Harry Enns (PC) 3987
- Phillip Schwarz (NDP) 1494
- Douglas Clifford (L) 1034

La Verendrye:

- (incumbent)Robert Banman (PC) 4914
- Alphonse Fournier (NDP) 1601
- Robert Rempel (L) 924

Logan:

- (incumbent)William Jenkins (NDP) 2956
- Rita Serbin (PC) 1449
- Piercy Haynes (L) 578

Minnedosa:

- (incumbent)Dave Blake (PC) 3912
- John Martens (NDP) 2311
- Albert Moad (L) 474
- C.V. Hutton (SC) 272

Morris:

- (incumbent)Warner Jorgenson (PC) 4484
- Alphonse Lenz (NDP) 1152
- Donald Macgillivray (L) 516

Osborne:

- Gerald Mercier (PC) 3803
- (incumbent)Ian Turnbull (NDP) 3707
- Gilbert Paul (L) 655
- Larry Johnston (RWL) 47

Pembina:

- Donald Orchard (PC) 5214
- Vic Epp (L) 1141
- Marianne Martin (NDP) 1117

1977 Manitoba general election: Point Douglas
Party	Candidate	Votes	%	±%
New Democratic	Donald Malinowski	3,116	63.32	
Progressive Conservative	Margaret Didenko	915	18.59	
Liberal	Don Marks	769	15.63	
Communist	Harold Dyck	62	1.26	
Social Credit	Peter Stevens	59	1.20	
Total valid votes		4,921	100.00	
Rejected votes		85		
Turnout		5,006	61.10	
Electors on the lists		8,193		

Portage la Prairie:

- Lloyd Hyde (PC) 3552
- Peter Swidnicki (NDP) 2067
- Hugh Moran (L) 1893

Radisson:

- Abe Kovnats (PC) 4535
- (incumbent)Harry Shafransky (NDP) 3757
- Evelyne Reese (L) 1394

Rhineland:

- (incumbent)Arnold Brown (PC) 3610
- Jacob Heinrichs (NDP) 1001
- Ray Hamm (L) 943
- Jacob Froese (SC) 813

Riel:

- (incumbent)Donald Craik (PC) 10412
- Doreen Dodick (NDP) 6427
- Charles Greene (L) 2539

River Heights:

- (incumbent)Sidney Spivak (PC) 6175
- David Walker (L) 1662
- Jill Oliver (NDP) 1091

Roblin:

- (incumbent)Wally McKenzie (PC) 3291
- Kenneth Mikolayenko (NDP) 2351
- Joe Andronyk (L) 410

Rock Lake:

- (incumbent)Henry Einarson (PC) 4243
- Ronald Devos (L) 1167
- Eric Irwin (NDP) 1029

Rossmere:

- (incumbent)Edward Schreyer (NDP) 9246
- Henry Krahn (PC) 8516
- Brian Norris (L) 680

Rupertsland:

- (incumbent)Harvey Bostrom (NDP) 2141
- George Weiss (PC) 1625
- Norman Gunn (L) 741

St. Boniface:

- (incumbent)Laurent Desjardins (NDP) 4266
- Peter Poitras (PC) 1833
- George Ricard (L) 1699

St. George:

- (incumbent)Bill Uruski (NDP) 3103
- Albert Rohl (PC) 2568
- Duncan Geisler (L) 369

St. James:

- (incumbent)George Minaker (PC) 5199
- Curtis Nordman (NDP) 2853
- John Wilson (L) 749

St. Johns:

- (incumbent)Saul Cherniack (NDP) 3845
- John Borger (PC) 1892
- Myroslaw Tracz (L) 733
- Don Plowman (Comm) 81

St. Matthews:

- Len Domino (PC) 3119
- (incumbent)Wally Johannson (NDP) 2995
- Roy Yerex (L) 459
- Richard Stonyk (SC) 72

1977 Manitoba general election: St. Vital
Party	Candidate	Votes	%	±%
New Democratic	Jim Walding	3,924	41.62	+2.37
Progressive Conservative	Gil Shaw	3,390	35.95	+13.38
Liberal	Eddie Coutu	2,115	22.43	−15.75
Total valid votes		9,429	100.00	
Rejected votes		18		
Turnout		9,447	84.70	−1.14
Electors on the lists		11,154		
New Democratic hold		Swing		-5.50

Ste. Rose:

- (incumbent)A.R. Pete Adam (NDP) 2611
- Arthur Erickson (PC) 1830
- John Fleming (L) 1219

Selkirk:

- (incumbent)Howard Pawley (NDP) 5519
- Tom Denton (PC) 4452
- Edward Motkaluk (L) 573

Seven Oaks:

- (incumbent)Saul Miller (NDP) 7597
- Carl Zawatsky (PC) 6777
- Sue Juravsky (L) 798
- Charles Watson (Comm) 70

Souris-Killarney:

- Brian Ransom (PC) 4519
- Howard Nixon (NDP) 1500
- Jean Strath (L) 1207

Springfield:

- Bob Anderson (PC) 5843
- (incumbent)Rene Toupin (NDP) 3995
- Rita Roeland (L) 700

Sturgeon Creek:

- (incumbent)Frank Johnston (PC) 7407
- Don Simpson (NDP) 2655
- Peter Moss (L) 1736

Swan River:

- Douglas Gourlay (PC) 3909
- Leonard Harapiuk (NDP) 3179

The Pas:

- (incumbent)Ron McBryde (NDP) 3471
- Percy Pielak (PC) 1965
- Edwin Jebb (L) 714

Thompson:

- Ken MacMaster (PC) 3947
- (incumbent)Ken Dillen (NDP) 3031
- Oliver Monkman (L) 283

Transcona:

- Wilson Parasiuk (NDP) 6474
- Tony Leonard (PC) 4749
- Douglas Dennison (L) 767

Virden:

- (incumbent)Morris McGregor (PC) 3669
- Edward Arndt (NDP) 1635

Wellington:

- Brian Corrin (NDP) 3591
- Geoff Dixon (PC) 2376
- Mario Santos (L) 591

Winnipeg Centre:

- (incumbent)Bud Boyce (NDP) 2217
- Philip Lee (PC) 1587
- Ken Wong (L) 727

1977 Manitoba general election: Wolseley
Party	Candidate	Votes	%	±%
Progressive Conservative	Robert Wilson	2,763	41.01	+18.63
New Democratic	Murdoch MacKay	2,689	39.90	+1.12
Liberal	Norma McCormick	1,286	19.09	-19.74
Turnout		6,873	74.98	
Progressive Conservative gain from Liberal		Swing		+19.18
Source: Elections Manitoba

=== Post-election changes ===
Rossmere (Edward Schreyer appointed Governor-General of Canada, December 7, 1978), October 16, 1979:

- Victor Schroeder (NDP) 6191
- Harold Piercy (PC) 5961
- E.J. Sandy Clancy (L) 523
- Linda J. Penner (WDP) 39
- Manuel Gitterman (M-L) 21

River Heights (res. Sidney Spivak, April 12, 1979), October 16, 1979:

- Gary Filmon (PC) 3473
- Jay Prober (L) 2477
- Don Jewison (NDP) 697
- William Hawryluk (WDP) 19

Fort Rouge (res. Lloyd Axworthy, April 6, 1979), October 16, 1979:

- June Westbury (L) 2659
- Vic Savino (NDP) 2291
- Julian Hugh McDonald (PC) 1830

Sidney Green (NDP) changed his party affiliation to Independent NDP on December 4, 1979.

Robert Wilson was expelled from the Progressive Conservative caucus on November 20, 1980, and from the Progressive Conservative party on November 28, 1980. On June 17, 1981, he was expelled from the legislature, having been sentenced to seven years in prison.

Ben Hanuschak (NDP) became an Independent MLA on February 26, 1981. On February 27, 1981, Bud Boyce left the NDP caucus.

On March 3, 1981, Green, Hanuschak and Boyce announced their membership in the new Progressive Party of Manitoba.

== See also ==
- List of Manitoba political parties

Preceded by 1973 Manitoba election	List of Manitoba elections	Succeeded by 1981 Manitoba election
