= Muriel Smith (politician) =

Canadian politician

Member of the Manitoba Legislative Assembly for Osborne
- In office 1981–1988
- Preceded by: Gerry Mercier
- Succeeded by: Reg Alcock

Personal details
- Born: Muriel Ann Lipsey; May 9, 1930 (age 96) Britannia Beach, British Columbia, Canada
- Party: New Democratic Party of Manitoba
- Spouse: Gordon Murray Rhodes Smith (m. 1952)
- Education: University of Manitoba, Oxford Institute of Education
- Profession: teacher, counsellor

Muriel Ann Smith, OC (née Lipsey; May 9, 1930) is a Manitoba politician. She ran for the leadership of the New Democratic Party of Manitoba in 1979, and subsequently served in the cabinet of NDP Premier Howard Pawley.

Smith is the daughter of George Cherry Lipsey and Mary MacDonald, at Britannia Beach, British Columbia, and was educated at the University of Manitoba and the Oxford Institute of Education, in Oxford, England. In 1952, she married Gordon Murray Rhodes Smith, son of former Manitoba Liberal politician Charles Rhodes Smith.

She worked as a counsellor, served on the Human Rights Commission of Manitoba from 1974 to 1978 and the Manitoba Action Centre on the Status of Women from 1975 to 1976. She was also President of the Manitoba NDP from 1975 to 1977.

She first ran for the provincial legislature in the 1973 provincial election, in the upscale Winnipeg riding of River Heights. She placed third, with Progressive Conservative leader Sidney Spivak winning the riding and future Liberal leader Charles Huband finishing second. Smith ran in Crescentwood in the 1977 election, losing to Progressive Conservative Warren Steen by 72 votes.

Smith was a representative of the NDP's left wing in the 1979 leadership race. Her supporters included supporters of "the Waffle" (a left-leaning group within the NDP) and many leading members of Manitoba's feminist community. Smith's campaign suffered a serious setback when she failed to receive the NDP nomination for a by-election in the riding of Fort Rouge. Notwithstanding, she finished a credible second place at the convention, losing to Howard Pawley.

She was elected to the Manitoba legislature for the first time in the 1981 election, representing the riding of Osborne. She joined cabinet on November 30, 1981, serving as Deputy Premier and Minister of Economic Development and Tourism. Muriel Smith was the first woman in Canada to serve as a deputy premier. On August 20, 1982, she was also entrusted with administration of the Development Corporation Act and A.E. McKenzie Company, Limited.

On November 4, 1983, Smith moved to the ministry of Community Services. On January 30, 1985, she was also appointed Minister responsible for the Status of Women, holding this position until April 17, 1986. She was again moved on September 21, 1987, serving as Minister of Labour and Housing while again receiving cabinet responsibilities for the Status of Women (replacing Judy Wasylycia-Leis, who had held the portfolio in the interim). Smith remained in cabinet until the Pawley government was defeated in 1988.

She was easily re-elected in the 1986 election, but lost to future federal cabinet minister Reg Alcock in 1988. She has not returned to active political life since this time. Smith later became Vice President of the United Nations Association in Canada, and has taught part-time in affirmative action social work. She was a member of the Advisory Council of the Order of Manitoba. In 2003, she supported Bill Blaikie's campaign to become leader of the federal New Democratic Party.

== Awards and honours ==
Smith became an Officer of the Order of Canada in 2007 That same year she also was a recipient of the Governor General's Award in Commemoration of the Person's Case.
