= Doreen Dodick =

Canadian politician (born 1932)

Member of the Manitoba Legislative Assembly for Riel
- In office 1969–1981
- Preceded by: Donald Craik
- Succeeded by: Gerry Ducharme

Personal details
- Born: Doreen Lois Oehlerking; February 17, 1932 (age 94) Moose Jaw, Saskatchewan, Canada
- Party: New Democratic Party of Manitoba
- Spouse: John Dodick (m. 1952; died 2007)

Doreen Lois Dodick (born February 17, 1932) is a former politician in Manitoba, Canada. She was a New Democratic Party member of the Legislative Assembly of Manitoba from 1981 to 1986.

She was born in 1932 in Moose Jaw, Saskatchewan, the daughter of Edward John Oehlerking and Ima Cathine Annable, was educated in Saskatchewan, and subsequently moved to Manitoba. In 1952, she married John Dodick. She worked as an organizer for the NDP before entering political life herself.

She was a candidate in the south Winnipeg riding of Riel in the provincial election of 1977, but lost to Tory incumbent Donald Craik by almost 4,000 votes. Four years later, in the provincial election of 1981, she defeated Craik by 242 votes in a rematch, as the NDP won a majority government under Howard Pawley. She was not appointed to cabinet.

In the 1986 election, Dodick lost to Tory challenger Gerry Ducharme by over 700 votes. She has not sought a return to provincial politics since this time. In the provincial election of 1999, she supported Linda Asper's campaign in the Riel riding.

In 2002, Dodick supported Bill Blaikie's bid to lead the federal New Democratic Party.
