= 1969 Manitoba general election =

- June 25, 1969

57 seats of the Legislative Assembly of Manitoba 29 seats were needed for a majority
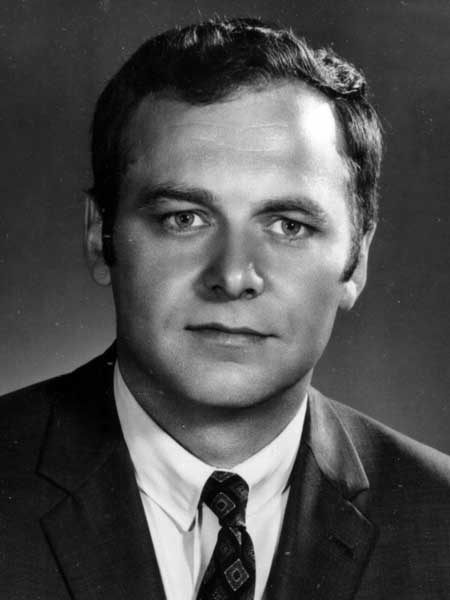

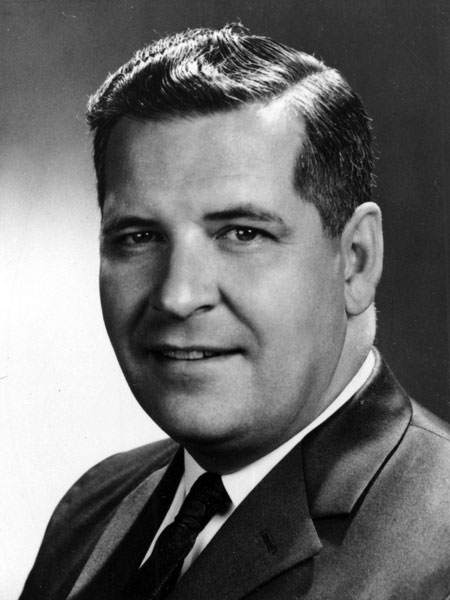
	First party	Second party
Leader	Edward Schreyer	Walter Weir
Party	New Democratic	Progressive Conservative
Leader since	June 7, 1969	November 25, 1967
Leader's seat	Rossmere	Minnedosa
Last election	11	31
Seats won	28	22
Seat change	▲17	▼9
Popular vote	128,080	119,021
Percentage	38.27%	35.56%
Swing	▲15.13pp	▼4.40pp
	Third party	Fourth party
	LIB	SC
Leader	Robert Bend	Jacob Froese
Party	Liberal	Social Credit
Leader since	May 10, 1969
Leader's seat	Ran in Lakeside (lost)	Rhineland
Last election	14	1
Seats won	5	1
Seat change	▼9	0
Popular vote	80,288	4,535
Percentage	23.99%	1.36%
Swing	▼9.14pp	▼2.18pp
- Map of Election Results
Premier before election
Walter Weir
Progressive Conservative
Premier after election
Edward Schreyer
New Democratic

The 1969 Manitoba general election was held on June 25, 1969 to elect Members of the Legislative Assembly (MLAs) of the Canadian province of Manitoba. It was a watershed moment in the province's political history. The social-democratic New Democratic Party emerged for the first time as the largest party in the legislature, winning 28 out of 57 seats. The governing Progressive Conservative Party, whose fortunes had slowly declined after former Premier Dufferin Roblin had left the role in an ultimately unsuccessful attempt to enter federal politics two years earlier, fell to 22, and the once-dominant Liberal Party fell to an historical low of five. The Social Credit Party won one seat, and there was also one Independent elected.

Although the NDP had risen from third place to only one seat short of a majority, it was not clear what form the government would take in the days immediately following the election. There were negotiations among the Liberals and Progressive Conservatives to form a minority coalition government, supported by the Social Credit and Independent members; under this scenario, former Liberal leader Gildas Molgat would have become Premier. These plans came to nothing when Liberal MLA Laurent Desjardins announced that he would sit as a "Liberal Democrat" supporting the NDP, allowing the NDP to form government by one seat. Edward Schreyer became the province's first social democratic Premier shortly thereafter.

The Manitoba NDP had a total election budget of $45,000. Although very small by modern standards, this was the most the party had ever spent up to this time.

The Liberals had managed to remain as the Official Opposition for a decade after losing power in 1959. However, this would be the start of almost 20 years in the political wilderness; the party would not come close to governing again until winning opposition status in 1988.

== Results ==
Party	Party Leader	# of candidates	Seats			Popular Vote		
Party	Party Leader	# of candidates	1966	Elected	% Change	#	%	Change
New Democratic	Edward Schreyer	57	11	28	+154.5%	128,080	38.27%	+15.13
Progressive Conservative	Walter Weir	57	31	22	-29.0%	119,021	35.56%	-4.40
Liberal	Robert Bend	57	14	5	-64.3%	80,288	23.99%	-9.14
Social Credit	Jacob Froese (?)	6	1	1	-	4,535	1.36%	-2.18
Communist	William Cecil Ross	2	-	-	-	744	0.22%	+0.02
Independent		5	-	1		2,020	0.60%	+0.57
Total		184	57	57	-	334,688	100%	

Popular vote
New Democratic	38.27%
PC	35.56%
Liberal	23.99%
Social Credit	1.36%
Others	0.82%

Seats summary
New Democratic	49.12%
PC	38.60%
Liberal	8.77%
Social Credit	1.75%
Independent	1.75%

Preceded by 1966 Manitoba election	List of Manitoba elections	Succeeded by 1973 Manitoba election

== See also ==
- List of Manitoba political parties

== Riding results ==
Party key:

- PC: Progressive Conservative Party of Manitoba
- L: Manitoba Liberal Party
- NDP: New Democratic Party of Manitoba
- SC: Manitoba Social Credit Party
- Comm: Communist Party of Canada - Manitoba
- Ind: Independent

Arthur:

- (incumbent)J. Douglas Watt (PC) 3133
- John McRae (L) 1375
- Raymond Jones (NDP) 980

Assiniboia:

- (incumbent)Stephen Patrick (L) 2355
- Bill Docking (PC) 2329
- Curtis Nordman (NDP) 1466

1969 Manitoba general election: Birtle-Russell
Party	Candidate	Votes	%	±%
Progressive Conservative	Harry Graham	2,374	39.59	
New Democratic	Donald Kostesky	2,263	37.74	
Liberal	John Braendle	1,360	22.68	
Total valid votes		5,997	100.00	
Rejected and discarded votes		12		
Turnout		6,009	72.47	
Electors on the lists		8,292		

Brandon East:

- Leonard Evans (NDP) 3035
- Emily Lyons (PC) 1962
- Don Martin (L) 1194

Brandon West:

- Edward McGill (PC) 2814
- James M. Skinner (NDP) 2310
- Terry Penton (L) 1796

Burrows:

- (incumbent)Ben Hanuschak (NDP) 3418
- Wasyl Michael Swystun (PC) 1317
- Olga E. Lewicki (L) 751
- Andrew Bileski (Comm) 323

Charleswood:

- Arthur Moug (PC) 3401
- Duncan Edmonds (L) 2361
- John C. Hilgenga (NDP) 1325

Churchill:

- Gordon Beard (Ind) 1151
- Walter Perepeluk (L) 971
- Andre Champagne (PC) 913
- Wilf Hudson (NDP) 822

Crescentwood:

- Cy Gonick (NDP) 2689
- (incumbent)Gurney Evans (PC) 2416
- Francis Creighton Muldoon (L) 1422

Dauphin:

- Peter Burtniak (NDP) 2933
- (incumbent)Stewart McLean (PC) 2892
- Robert E. Sheldon (L) 620

Elmwood:

- (incumbent)Russell Doern (NDP) 3803
- Alan George Gardiner (PC) 1526
- John Kozoriz (L) 1053

Emerson:

- Gabriel Girard (PC) 2467
- (incumbent)John Tanchak (L) 2014
- Stephen Zaretski (NDP) 695
- Jacob Wall (SC) 237

Flin Flon:

- Thomas Barrow (NDP) 2045
- (incumbent)Charles H. Witney (PC) 1675
- Francis Jobin (L) 1276

Fort Garry:

- Bud Sherman (PC) 3570
- G. Grant Cosby (NDP) 2063
- Richard Alan Wankling (L) 1936

Fort Rouge:

- Inez Trueman (PC) 2750
- Una Decter (NDP) 2446
- Jane Sayler Heffelfinger (L) 1941

Gimli:

- John Gottfried (NDP) 2159
- Eric Stefanson (PC) 1936
- Walter Griffin (L) 1663

Gladstone:

- James Ferguson (PC) 3000
- (incumbent)Nelson Shoemaker (L) 2583
- Mary McIntosh (NDP) 1064

Inkster:

- (incumbent)Sidney Green (NDP) 4001
- Robert Armstrong (PC) 989
- Gurzon Harvey (L) 661

Kildonan:

- (incumbent)Peter Fox (NDP) 4589
- Don Mills (PC) 1876
- John Gugulyn (L) 851

Lac Du Bonnet:

- (incumbent)Samuel Uskiw (NDP) 4060
- (incumbent)Fred Klym (PC) 1267
- Al Tymko (L) 806

Lakeside:

- (incumbent)Harry Enns (PC) 2532
- Robert Bend (L) 2190

1969 Manitoba general election: La Verendrye
Party	Candidate	Votes	%	±%
Liberal	Leonard Barkman	1,933	52.17	-15.58
Progressive Conservative	John Blatz	1,051	28.37	-3.88
New Democratic	Elmer Reimer	721	19.46	–
Total valid votes		3,705	–	–
Rejected		29	–	
Eligible voters / turnout		7,369	50.67	4.17
Source(s) Source: Manitoba. Chief Electoral Officer (1999). Statement of Votes for the 37th Provincial General Election, September 21, 1999 (PDF) (Report). Winnipeg: Elections Manitoba.

Logan:

- William Jenkins (NDP) 3029
- Samuel Minuk (PC) 871
- Howard Ferguson (L) 679

Minnedosa:

- (incumbent)Walter Weir (PC) 3525
- Emile Roy Shellborn (NDP) 1713
- Donald McNabb (L) 1028

1969 Manitoba general election: Morris
Party	Candidate	Votes	%	±%
Progressive Conservative	Warner Jorgenson	2,472	53.76	-12.01
Liberal	Joseph Legault	1,183	25.73	-0.05
New Democratic	William T. Loftus	712	15.48	7.03
Social Credit	Henry Funk	231	5.02	–
Total valid votes		4,598	–	–
Rejected		15	–	
Eligible voters / Turnout		7,537	61.20	–
Source(s) Source: Manitoba. Chief Electoral Officer (1999). Statement of Votes for the 37th Provincial General Election, September 21, 1999 (PDF) (Report). Winnipeg: Elections Manitoba.

Osborne:

- Ian Turnbull (NDP) 3188
- (incumbent)Obie Baizley (PC) 2565
- Win Loewen (L) 965

Pembina:

- George Henderson (PC) 2823
- Kenneth John Draper (L) 1815
- David Harms (SC) 521
- Edith Alsop (NDP) 336

1969 Manitoba general election: Point Douglas
Party	Candidate	Votes	%	±%
New Democratic	Donald Malinowski	2,253	52.52	
Progressive Conservative	Slaw Rebchuk	1,088	25.36	
Liberal	Roger Garrity	528	12.31	
Communist	Bill Kardash	421	9.81	
Total valid votes		4,290	100.00	
Rejected and discarded votes		62		
Turnout		4,352	46.37	
Electors on the lists		9,385		

Portage la Prairie:

- (incumbent)Gordon Johnston (L) 2451
- Harvey Carmichael (PC) 2440
- Sidney Coulthard (NDP) 1049

Radisson:

- Harry Shafransky (NDP) 3707
- Edward Joseph Albert Kotowich (L) 2284
- Moreen Henderson (PC) 1054

Rhineland:

- (incumbent)Jacob Froese (SC) 1981
- Henry Hildebrand (PC) 1853
- Willo Sterritt Forrester (L) 782
- Jacob W. Heinrichs (NDP) 181

Riel:

- (incumbent)Donald Craik (PC) 3125
- James Edward Buchanan (NDP) 3096
- Raymond Spence (L) 1423

River Heights:

- (incumbent)Sidney Spivak (PC) 4623
- Mark Danzker (L) 1573
- Jack Silverberg (NDP) 1051

Roblin:

- (incumbent)J. Wally McKenzie (PC) 2579
- (incumbent)Mike Kawchuk (NDP) 2448
- J.R. Mitchell (L) 516

Rock Lake:

- (incumbent)Henry Einarson (PC) 3064
- Remi Engelbert DePape (L) 1818
- Timothy Leonard (NDP) 763

Rossmere:

- Edward Schreyer (NDP) 4089
- David Wilfred Pekary (PC) 1746
- Vern Breckman (L) 631
- Stanley Copp (Ind) 238

Rupertsland:

- Jean Allard (NDP) 1366
- S. P. Berthelette (L) 1142
- Paul Burelle (PC) 1026

St. Boniface:

- (incumbent)Laurent Desjardins (L) 4210
- Kamil Michael Gajdosik (NDP) 2656
- Maurice J. Arpin (PC) 1110

St. George:

- Bill Uruski (NDP) 2284
- (incumbent)Elman Guttormson (L) 1886
- Joseph Schwartz (PC) 1169

St. James:

- Al Mackling (NDP) 3642
- (incumbent)Douglas Stanes (PC) 2676
- Peter Moss (L) 1404

St. Johns:

- (incumbent)Saul Cherniack (NDP) 3642
- Joe Rozmus (PC) 1014
- George Strewchuk (L) 736

St. Matthews:

- Wally Johannson (NDP) 2974
- (incumbent)Robert Steen (PC) 2217
- Rudy Peters (L) 1119

1969 Manitoba general election: St. Vital
Party	Candidate	Votes	%	±%
Progressive Conservative	Jack Hardy	2,587	36.01	
New Democratic	Jim Walding	2,564	35.69	
Liberal	Joe Stangl	2,034	28.31	
Total valid votes		7,185	100.00	
Rejected votes		39		
Turnout		7,224	68.04	
Electors on the lists		10,617		
Progressive Conservative hold		Swing		

Ste. Rose:

- (incumbent)Gildas Molgat (L) 2247
- Heinz Marohn (PC) 1198
- Leon Hoefer (NDP) 754
- Norma Oswald (SC) 313

Selkirk:

- Howard Pawley (NDP) 3374
- Robert Stefan Oliver (PC) 2054
- George S. Sigurdson (L) 835
- Thomas Norquay (Ind) 57

Seven Oaks:

- (incumbent)Saul Miller (NDP) 4203
- Daniel Abraham Yanofsky (PC) 1505
- Evelyne Rosborough (L) 813

Souris-Killarney:

- (incumbent)Malcolm Earl McKellar (PC) 3053
- (incumbent)Edward Dow (L) 1982
- Wayne Williams (NDP) 892

Springfield:

- Rene Toupin (NDP) 2724
- George Mulder (PC) 1551
- Hector Bahuaud (L) 807

Sturgeon Creek:

- Frank Johnston (PC) 2781
- Robert Megill Chipman (L) 2251
- Stanley J. Carter (NDP) 1251
- William John Turner (Ind) 336
- James Farrell (Ind) 238

Swan River:

- (incumbent)James Bilton (PC) 1920
- Alex Filuk (NDP) 1757
- Jerry Webb (SC) 1252
- Gordon Beaumont (L) 766

The Pas:

- Ron McBryde (NDP) 1556
- (incumbent)John Carroll (PC) 1361
- Calvert D. Gibson (L) 963

Thompson:

- (incumbent)Joseph Borowski (NDP) 2436
- Thomas Farrell (PC) 1500
- Maurice Desjardins (L) 843

Transcona:

- (incumbent)Russ Paulley (NDP) 4614
- Thelma Jean Opseth Call (L) 1488
- Kenn Gunn-Walberg (PC) 1052

Virden:

- (incumbent)Morris McGregor (PC) 2161
- (incumbent)Earl Dawson (L) 1571
- Ralph Rowan (NDP) 1531

Wellington:

- (incumbent)Philip Petursson (NDP) 3260
- William McGarva (PC) 1522
- Thomas Bernes(L) 1035

Winnipeg Centre:

- Bud Boyce (NDP) 2398
- (incumbent)James Cowan (PC) 1451
- Joseph Wapemoose (L) 822

Wolseley:

- (incumbent)Leonard Claydon (PC) 2360
- Hans J. Wittich (NDP) 1743
- Paul N. Duval (L) 1391

=== Post-election changes ===
Jack Hardy (St. Vital, PC) resigned his seat. A by-election was called for April 5, 1971.

Manitoba provincial by-election, April 5, 1971: St. Vital Resignation of Jack Hardy
Party	Candidate	Votes	%	±%
New Democratic	Jim Walding	3,378	35.94	+0.25
Liberal	Dan Kennedy	3,083	32.80	+4.49
Progressive Conservative	Kenneth Pratt	2,925	31.12	−4.89
Independent	Sam Bordman	13	0.14	
Total valid votes		9,399	99.89	
Rejected and declined ballots		10	0.11	
Turnout		9,409	83.05	+15.01
Electors on the lists		11,329		
New Democratic gain from Progressive Conservative		Swing		+2.57

Ste. Rose (res. Gildas Molgat, October 7, 1970), April 5, 1971:

- Aime Adam (NDP) 2785
- Fred Werbiski (L) 2118
- John Borcher (PC) 1792

Minnedosa (res. Walter Weir, September 1971), November 16, 1971:

- Dave Blake (PC) 3532
- Emil Shellborn (NDP) 2348
- Hugh Stephenson (L) 1129

Laurent Desjardins formally joined the NDP in 1971.

Wolseley (dec. Leonard Claydon, 1971), June 16, 1972:

- Israel Asper (L) 3530
- Ernie J. Enns (PC) 2271
- Vic Schroeder (NDP) 2174
- William Hawryluk (Ind) 45

Jean Allard left the NDP to sit as an independent on April 7, 1972. Joseph Borowski left the NDP caucus on June 25, 1972.

Churchill (dec. Gordon Beard, November 12, 1972)
