= RWL =

RWL may refer to:

- Revolutionary Workers League (Oehlerite)
- Revolutionary Workers League (in Manitoba)
- Revolutionary Workers League/Ligue Ouvrière Révolutionnaire
- Revolutionary Workers League (U.S.)
