= Len Domino =

Canadian politician

Member of the Manitoba Legislative Assembly for St. Matthews
- In office 1977–1981
- Preceded by: Wally Johannson

Personal details
- Born: January 17, 1950 (age 76) Redvers, Saskatchewan, Canada
- Party: Progressive Conservative Party of Manitoba
- Education: University of Manitoba
- Profession: Teacher

Leonard Anthony Domino (born January 17, 1950) is a politician in Manitoba, Canada. He was a Progressive Conservative member of the Legislative Assembly of Manitoba from 1977 to 1981.

Domino was educated at the University of Winnipeg and the University of Manitoba, and worked as a high school teacher. He was the President of the national Progressive Conservative Youth Federation from 1971 to 1973, and was a member of the Canadian Civil Liberties Union.

Domino was elected to the Manitoba legislature in the provincial election of 1977, defeating incumbent New Democrat Wally Johannson by 124 votes in the riding of St. Matthews. The Progressive Conservatives won the election, and Domino sat as a backbench supporter of Sterling Lyon's government for the next four years.

In the 1981 election, he ran in the redistributed riding of Wolseley and lost to New Democrat Myrna Phillips. He has not sought a return to political office since this time.

Domino now operates the firm of Leonard Domino & Associates, a Toronto-based firm that specializes in government relations for corporate and not-for-profit clients.
