= 1974 Winnipeg municipal election =

The 1974 Winnipeg municipal election was held on October 23, 1974 to elect a mayor, councillors and school trustees in the city of Winnipeg.

Stephen Juba was re-elected in the mayoral contest.

Fifty councillors elected in 50 separate single-member districts.

== Results ==
1974 Winnipeg municipal election: Councillor, Memorial Ward
Party	Candidate	Votes	%
Independent Citizens' Election Committee	(x)Robert Wilson	1,431	68.80
NDP	Jim Maloway	649	31.20
Total valid votes		2,080	100.00

Results are taken from the Winnipeg Free Press newspaper, 24 October 1974.
