= Robert Steen =

Canadian politician

Member of the Legislative Assembly of Manitoba for St. Matthews
- In office 1966–1969
- Preceded by: William G. Martin
- Succeeded by: Wally Johannson

38th Mayor of Winnipeg
- In office 1977–1979
- Preceded by: Stephen Juba
- Succeeded by: Bill Norrie

Winnipeg City Councillor
- In office 1971–1977
- Preceded by: unknown
- Succeeded by: Cyril Keeper
- Constituency: unknown

Personal details
- Born: August 12, 1933 Winnipeg, Manitoba, Canada
- Died: May 10, 1979 (aged 45) Winnipeg, Manitoba, Canada
- Party: Progressive Conservative
- Relations: Warren Steen (brother)
- Education: University of Manitoba

Robert Ashley Steen, QC (August 12, 1933 – May 10, 1979) was a Canadian politician from the province of Manitoba. He was a Progressive Conservative member of the Legislative Assembly of Manitoba from 1966 to 1969, and later served as the 38th Mayor of Winnipeg from 1977 to 1979.

Born in Winnipeg in 1933, Steen was educated at the University of Manitoba and the Manitoba Law School, was called to the Manitoba bar in 1959 and worked as a barrister and solicitor. In March 1979, he was appointed Queen's Counsel for his exceptional merit and contribution to the legal profession.

His brother Warren also served on Winnipeg city council and in the provincial assembly.

Steen was an adviser to the federal Minister of Veterans Affairs in 1961, and to the provincial Minister of Education in 1965.

He was elected to the Manitoba legislature in the 1966 provincial election, winning a relatively easy victory in the Winnipeg riding of St. Matthews. For the next three years, he served as a backbench supporter of the governments of Dufferin Roblin and Walter Weir.

The Progressive Conservatives were defeated by the New Democratic Party in the 1969 provincial election, and Steen lost his seat to NDP candidate Wally Johannson by almost 800 votes. He tried to return to the legislature in the 1973 provincial election, but finished third against Liberal leader Izzy Asper in the riding of Wolseley.

He had much greater success in municipal politics. Steen was elected to the Winnipeg City Council in the elections of 1971 and 1974. Originally aligned with the right-wing Independent Citizens' Election Committee, Steen later broke away from this group and emerged as an independent centrist.

In 1977, Winnipeg mayor Stephen Juba announced his retirement after twenty years in office. He made this announcement in the most dramatic manner possible, waiting until almost the last moment before declaring that he would not file nomination papers (many believe he did this to prevent Bernie Wolfe from organizing a campaign to succeed him).

Steen, who had entered the race as a long-shot candidate, suddenly found himself supported by Juba's north-end support base. Although not a left-wing candidate, he was seen by many on the left as more palatable than Bill Norrie, the candidate of the ICEC. The results were extremely close, with Steen defeating Norrie by 69,818 votes to 67,999.

Steen had developed a reputation as a master deal maker during his time in council but died of liver cancer on May 10, 1979 soon after taking office. Bill Norrie easily won the by-election that followed.

He served as chairman of the board for the Misericordia Hospital in Winnipeg, the hospital where he was born and later died.

In 1980, the National Film Board of Canada issued a documentary film entitled "The New Mayor", covering Steen's rise to power.

The Robert A. Steen Day Hospital [a part of Riverview Health Centre] and the Robert A. Steen Community Centre are named in his honour. Additionally, the annual winner of the Manitoba Marathon is awarded the Mayor Robert Steen Memorial Trophy. Finally, The Mayor Robert Steen Memorial Trophy is awarded annually to the top pins over average bowler at the Manitoba Master Bantam Junior 5 Pin Bowling Tournament.

Preceded by Stephen Juba	Mayor of Winnipeg, MB; 1977-1979	Succeeded by Bill Norrie
