= Murdoch MacKay =

Canadian politician (1930–2023)

Murdoch MacKay (1 March 1930 – 18 July 2023) was a Canadian lawyer and politician in Manitoba, Canada. He was president of the New Democratic Party of Manitoba during the 1970s, and later joined the breakaway Progressive Party.

His son-in-law, Paul Edwards, was leader of the Manitoba Liberal Party from 1993 to 1996.

== Early life and career ==
MacKay was born in Winnipeg, Manitoba on 1 March 1930. He received a Bachelor of Arts degree from the University of Winnipeg in 1950, and a Bachelor of Law degree from the Manitoba Law School in 1955. He led an inquiry into labour negotiations into the glass industry, and subsequently served as chair of the Manitoba Labour Board for seven years. He was also a member of the Manitoba Development Corporation board. Once a member of the Liberal Party, he later joined the New Democratic Party and served as its provincial president from 1972 to 1974.

== Political career ==
MacKay was the New Democratic Party's candidate for the division of Wolseley in the 1973 provincial election. On election night, official results showed that he had received the same number of votes as Liberal Party leader Izzy Asper. Jim Maloway, the returning officer, cast a tiebreaking vote for MacKay and declared him as the elected member; a subsequent recount, however, determined that Asper actually won by four votes. Herb Schulz's memoirs indicate that MacKay would have been appointed as Justice Minister in Edward Schreyer's government, had he been elected.

Asper resigned his seat in 1975, and MacKay contested a by-election to replace him. He finished third against Progressive Conservative candidate Robert Wilson in a close three-way contest. He contested Wolseley for a third time in the 1977 provincial election, and lost to Wilson by only 74 votes.

MacKay was a founding member of the Progressive Party, which was created by former NDP cabinet minister Sidney Green in 1981. He again sought election in Wolseley in the 1981 provincial election, and was resoundingly defeated.

== After politics ==
MacKay was also part-owner of Superior Cheese Canada Ltd. in the 1980s. He initially supported a union shop for the plant, but later announced that he had "second thoughts" and argued for an open shop structure. In 1996, he argued that Manitoba should abandon the Rand formula of mandatory dues collection and allow workers to opt out of union membership. Peter Olfert, president of the Manitoba Government Employees' Association, described this suggestion as regressive. In 2003, MacKay argued that Manitoba's labour laws were anti-business, and preventing economic growth.

MacKay was a founding board member of the Frontier Centre for Public Policy. The Centre's 2001 annual report lists him a lawyer with the Winnipeg firm, Duboff, Edwards, Haight and Schachter, specializing in corporate and labour law, as well as a director of Jory Capital Inc. and the Mount Caramel Clinic, and a Secretary of the Frontier Centre.

MacKay debated former political rival Al Mackling in a series of letters to the editor in 2006, on the subject of collective bargaining.

MacKay died in Winnipeg on 18 July 2023, at the age of 93.
