= Cy Gonick =

Canadian politician

Member of the Legislative Assembly of Manitoba for Crescentwood
- In office June 25, 1969 – June 28, 1973
- Succeeded by: Harvey Patterson

Personal details
- Born: April 8, 1936 (age 90) Winnipeg, Manitoba, Canada
- Party: New Democratic Party of Manitoba
- Education: University of California, Los Angeles; Columbia University University of California, Berkeley

Cyrl W. "Cy" Gonick (born April 8, 1936) is a former politician in Manitoba, Canada. He was a member of the Legislative Assembly of Manitoba from 1969 to 1973, sitting as a member of the New Democratic Party.

Gonick was born in Winnipeg to Louis Gonick and Minnie Chernick. Gonick attended Kelvin High School in Winnipeg. He attended the University of California, Los Angeles, Columbia University, and Berkeley in the mid-1950s and early 1960s. Gonick took a faculty position at the University of Saskatchewan in Saskatoon. He was a founding editor of Canadian Dimension, a socialist journal subsequently based in Winnipeg.

Gonick was elected to the legislature in the provincial election of 1969, defeating incumbent Progressive Conservative Gurney Evans by 273 votes in the Winnipeg riding of Crescentwood. He was a backbencher in Premier Edward Schreyer's government for the next four years.

Gonick was the only Manitoba NDP MLA who was an avowed member of "The Waffle", the NDP's radical wing, during this period. He frequently criticized his government from the left, particularly on issues such as medical billing practices and the foreign ownership of natural resources. He once introduced a private member's bill which would have required all medical doctors to make their incomes public.

He did not run for re-election in the 1973 Manitoba general election and did not seek a return to provincial politics after this time. He returned to teaching at the University of Manitoba where he was the program coordinator for the Labour and Workplace Studies Program, retiring in 2001.

His son Noam Gonick is a noted Canadian film director.

== Major publications ==
- Out of Work: Why There's So Much Unemployment, and Why It's Getting Worse (1978)
- Inflation or Depression: The Continuing Crisis of the Canadian Economy (1975)
- The Great Economic Debate: Failed Economics and a Future for Canada (1987)
- A Very Red Life: The Story of Bill Walsh (2001)
- Canada Since 1960: A People's History (2016)
