= Don Marks =

Canadian writer (1953–2016)

Donald Dean Marks (June 19, 1953 – January 30, 2016) was a Canadian writer, director and producer in Winnipeg, Manitoba.

== Background ==
Marks was once a street youth before being adopted by a First Nations family. From 1974 to 1976, he was co-ordinator of the War Resister Information Program in Winnipeg, providing assistance for Americans who moved to Canada to avoid service in the Vietnam War. Marks gained notoriety during a North American wide media tour to publicize WRIP's activities and by leading a class action lawsuit against President Gerald Ford. Don worked with such notables as Hunter S. Thompson, Jane Fonda, Richard Dreyfuss, Bella Abzug and others to organize an amnesty for war resistors, He was a candidate for the Manitoba Liberal Party in the 1977 provincial election, and received 769 votes (15.63%) for a third-place finish in Point Douglas. He was a weekend news and sports anchor at CKND-TV during the mid-1980s. He died in Winnipeg at the age of 62 on January 30, 2016, from liver disease.

== Aboriginal focus ==
Marks is not aboriginal by background, but was raised by an indigenous family. Elijah Harper once said of Marks, "I don't view him as a white person. As a matter of fact, I view him as a brother, like you do when you get to know a person and become comfortable talking with him." In 1982, he collaborated with Bill Brittain in preparing an original stage musical called InDEO, which examines aspects of native life before and after European conquest and featured rock, classical, blues, folk, opera and native traditional music. Live performances featured the singer Shingoose in a lead role. Marks and Shingoose subsequently collaborated in the partnership Native Multimedia Productions Inc., and worked together in several television ventures. They created the First Nations-themed show Full Circle (later First Nations Magazine) in 1986. Three years later, they worked as co-executive producers of the CTV variety show Indian Time, featuring Buffy Sainte Marie, Charlie Hill, Max Gail and Tom Jackson which received an American Indian Film Festival Spirit Award and a 1989 Gemini nomination for Best Canadian Variety Program. Marks later directed Indian Time 2: Fly With Eagles for Global TV in 1991, which earned Marks another Gemini nomination for Best Director (Toronto Star, 9 August 1992), and wrote and directed First Nations for CKND in 1993, both in collaboration with Shingoose. The latter work examined aspects of aboriginal life in Winnipeg.

In the summer of 1994, Marks organized the Sagkeeng First Nations Gathering in collaboration with native and non-native groups. Later in the year, he produced the special "Boys in the Hood" to focus on aboriginal talent in Winnipeg. He issued Friends - With a Difference, a hard-hitting work about general trends of racism in Canada, in 1985. Marks also managed aboriginal singer Aaron Peters in this period.

Marks once said that he started creating aboriginal-themed television shows to counter the negative perceptions of aboriginals in the mainstream media during his youth. He said, "All you ever saw about Indians back then was either a political confrontation, Main Street's socio-economic problems or the buckskin-and-beads powwow stuff. Nobody was doing stories about contemporary aboriginal people who were contributing to society. I was out there, seeing so many positive things, and I just wanted to say, 'Hey, wait a minute. Don't judge everybody by Main Street'." Don was chosen for the Manitoba Human Rights Achievement Award by the Manitoba Human Rights Commission in 1993.

Don also wrote, produced and directed numerous episodes of the "Man Alive" (CBC) television documentary series, including the Gemini Award-winning "The Red Road" episode, along with CanPro, Dreamspeakers, MMPIA and many other national and international awards.

In the late 1990s, Marks produced a video to combat the problem of solvent abuse in aboriginal communities. He produced a five-part documentary series called Everywhere Spirit with Shingoose in 2000. He produced a work in 2001 entitled They Call Me Chief about aboriginal talent in the National Hockey League, which was awarded Best Documentary Film at the Fargo Film Festival. He produced Indian Time 3 in 2003.

He wrote a tribute piece for media mogul Izzy Asper in 2003, thanking him for his support in the First Nations Magazine and Indian Time series.

He became a freelance writer with the Winnipeg Free Press in 2005, and began working on a documentary about Fetal Alcohol Syndrome Disorder. In November of the same year, he organized an exhibition hockey game between aboriginal ex-NHL players and alumni of the Winnipeg Jets to raise funds for the White Buffalo Spiritual Society

Marks wrote a column and news features for Grassroots News - Manitoba's largest Aboriginal newspaper, and became Editor of this publication in January 2008. Marks is developing the television variety program, Indian Time 4, and has founded TRUTH Video Productions, which produces documentaries about social and economic justice in First Nations communities.

Don Marks launched his second book, "They Call Me Chief" in October 2008 (published by J. Gordon Shillingford Publishing, The University of Toronto Press and represented by the Literary Press Group). "They Call Me Chief" is a Canadian best seller (over 5,000 copies)

Marks wrote a regular column in the Winnipeg Free Press, Sou-wester and Grassroots News. In 2012–13, he wrote and directed "Behind in the Count"; a documentary about the 1965 Canadian champion little league baseball team from CPAC in Winnipeg's north end. In November 2014, Mark stopped writing for the Free Press and began writing columns for the CBC Manitoba website. He also wrote and directed a documentary on First Nations economic development with an emphasis on the rise and fall of the Tribal Councils Investment Group for the CBC.
