= Harvey Patterson =

Canadian politician

Member of the Legislative Assembly of Manitoba for Crescentwood
- In office June 28, 1973 – February 20, 1975
- Preceded by: Cy Gonick
- Succeeded by: Warren Steen

Personal details
- Born: September 12, 1924 Roland, Manitoba
- Died: April 8, 2014 (aged 89) Winnipeg, Manitoba
- Education: University of Manitoba

Harvey Norman Murray Patterson (September 12, 1924 – April 8, 2014) was a Canadian politician in Manitoba, Canada. He served as a New Democratic member of the Legislative Assembly of Manitoba from 1973 to 1975. His term in office is usually remembered for the controversial nature of his election.

== Early life and career ==
The son of Norman Clifford Patterson and Isabel Baker, he was born in Roland, Manitoba and educated at University of Manitoba, and served overseas with the Queen's Own Cameron Highlanders of Canada in World War II. Patterson married Margaret Black in 1946. Before entering politics, he worked as a tractor trailer driver. In 1961, he was a delegate to the founding convention of the New Democratic Party in Ottawa, Ontario.

He was actively involved in Winnipeg's labour movement, serving as President of the Winnipeg Labour Council in the early 1970s (at a time when the WLC was losing members to the Manitoba Federation of Labour). He was also the chairman for the province's 1970 Panel on Labour Relations and its 1971 Panel on Human Rights and Consumer Affairs.

== Political career ==
In the provincial election of 1973, Patterson ran for the NDP in the Winnipeg riding of Crescentwood against Progressive Conservative Lawrie Pollard and Liberal June Menzies. Patterson won on election night, but a judicial recount invalidated 150 ballots and handed the victory to Pollard. The recount was appealed and a revised count was a tie. The returning officer broke the tie in Patterson's favour.

After an investigation into the ballot-counting process, Patterson's election was declared void on February 20, 1975. He ran again in the succeeding by-election, but finished third against Progressive Conservative Warren Steen and Liberal leader Charles Huband. He did not seek a return to public office after this time.

== Post electoral career ==
In 1978, Patterson became Executive Secretary of the Winnipeg Labour Council. He retired in the mid-1980s.
