= Warren Steen =

Canadian politician

Robert Steen

Member of the Manitoba Legislative Assembly for Crescentwood
- In office 1975–1981
- Preceded by: Harvey Patterson
- Succeeded by: Riding abolished

Member of the Manitoba Legislative Assembly for River Heights
- In office 1981–1986
- Preceded by: Sidney Spivak
- Succeeded by: Sharon Carstairs

Winnipeg City Councillor
- In office 1971–1975

Personal details
- Born: July 22, 1940 Winnipeg, Manitoba, Canada
- Died: August 19, 2009 (aged 69) Winnipeg, Manitoba, Canada
- Party: Progressive Conservative
- Spouse: Margaret Jean "Peggy" Hunter
- Relations: Manley Steen (father); Robert Steen (brother)
- Children: 1
- Education: University of Manitoba

Warren Steen (July 22, 1940 – August 19, 2009) was a Canadian politician from the province of Manitoba. He served as a member of the Legislative Assembly of Manitoba from 1975 to 1986, as a Progressive Conservative.

== Biography ==
The son of Manley Steen, Steen was born in Winnipeg in 1940 was educated at the University of Winnipeg. Steen was executive assistant for Manitoba Minister of Agriculture George Hutton from 1962 to 1963. He served as an alderman in the old city of Winnipeg from 1970 to 1971, and as a Councillor in the amalgamated city from 1971 to 1975.

He was first elected to the Manitoba legislature in a 1975 by-election in the central Winnipeg riding of Crescentwood, defeating Liberal leader Charles Huband by 169 votes (the former MLA, New Democrat Harvey Patterson, finished third). Two years later, in the general election of 1977, he retained the seat against New Democrat Muriel Smith by 72 votes, with Huband dropping to third place. The Progressive Conservatives won this election, although Premier Sterling Lyon did not invite Steen to join his cabinet.

The NDP defeated the PC government in the 1981 election, although ironically Steen was re-elected in the riding of River Heights by an increased majority. He retained his seat until the 1986 provincial election, when Liberal leader Sharon Carstairs defeated him (this was the only seat won by the Liberal Party in this election). After his defeat in 1986, Steen did not seek to return to provincial politics, spending the rest of his working life in the insurance industry as a life underwriter.

He died on August 19, 2009 at St. Boniface Hospital in Winnipeg, at the age of 69.

His brother Robert was also a Manitoba MLA and served as mayor of Winnipeg. He also had a second brother, Daryl. He married Margaret Jean "Peggy" Hunter in 1966; they had a daughter named Laura.
