= Revolutionary Workers League (in Manitoba) =

The Revolutionary Workers League was a Canadian Trotskyist group, formed in 1977 by a merger of four other organizations.

The RWL had a number of members active in the New Democratic Party (NDP), while also maintaining a separate public organization and newspaper (therefore they did not consider themselves to be entrists). The party generally endorsed NDP candidates in elections, but ran their own on some occasions, generally in ridings which the NDP did not contest, or had very little chance of winning.

Larry Johnston was the sole candidate of the Manitoba branch of the Revolutionary Workers League in the 1977 provincial election, campaigning in the Winnipeg riding of Osborne. He received 47 votes.

This appears to have been the only time that the Manitoba RWL endorsed one of its own candidates in a provincial election. It is not clear how long Johnston remained in the RWL after this.

During the 1980s, the RWL became divided between Trotskyist supporters of permanent revolution and followers of the American Socialist Workers Party, which after 1982 supported Fidel Castro's Cuba as the vanguard of world revolution. It is unclear if the Manitoba RWL still existed by the time of this division.

== See also ==
Canadian political parties
