= Charles Huband =

Canadian politician and judge (1932–2023)

Charles R. Huband OM (February 23, 1932–June 14, 2023) was a Manitoba politician, who subsequently became a judge. He was the leader of the Manitoba Liberal Party between 1975 and 1978.

Huband attended the University of Manitoba in the 1950s, earning his Bachelor of Laws degree from the University of Manitoba in 1955.

Huband was a member of the Metropolitan Council of Winnipeg from 1964 until 1968 (in which year he served as its Vice Chair). He supported the amalgamation of the city with its suburban neighbourhoods, which was accomplished in the early 1970s by New Democratic Party Premier Edward Schreyer.

Huband first attempted to run for the provincial legislature in 1966, but lost the Liberal nomination in Wolseley to Julius Koteles. He later alleged that Koteles signed up several "instant members" to win the nomination.

Huband ran in the upscale riding of River Heights in the 1973 provincial election, and lost to Progressive Conservative leader Sidney Spivak.

Huband was elected leader of the Manitoba Liberal Party on February 22, 1975, defeating his lone opponent Lloyd Henderson by 381 votes to 87. The party had only four seats in the 57-member legislature at the time, and was in need of renewal. Huband represented a more centrist direction in the party, which had long been considered very right-wing for its time. Under the rural populism of Robert Bend and the libertarianism of Israel Asper, the party's electoral fortunes had progressively declined. In a province that had become increasingly polarized between the Tories and NDP, the Liberals were finding it increasingly difficult to present themselves as an alternative.

Huband declared himself a candidate when the central Winnipeg seat of Crescentwood became vacant in early 1975, after the one-vote victory of NDP MLA Harvey Patterson in the 1973 election was overturned. Huband was narrowly defeated by Tory incumbent Warren Steen. He again lost to Steen in the general election of 1977, as the Manitoba Liberals fell to only one seat (that of Lloyd Axworthy).

Huband resigned as party leader in 1978, and later became a Manitoba Court of Appeal judge. In the mid-1990s, he ruled that the Canadian Wheat Board could not be sued by producers. This decision was given in response to a challenge initiated by the right-wing group Farmers For Justice.

In 1996, Huband's years of service to the legal profession were recognized by the Manitoba Bar Association, which presented him with its Distinguished Service Award.

In 2007, Huband retired from the Manitoba Court of Appeal and resumed private practice, joining the firm of Taylor McCaffrey LLP.

Huband was an active member of the United Church of Canada and in June 2014 he was elected to the governing council of the Manitoba Historical Society.

Huband tried to return to politics when he won the Liberal nomination in the riding of Portage la Prairie during the 2019 provincial election, and finished a distant third.
