= New Democratic Party of Manitoba leadership elections =

The New Democratic Party of Manitoba has held seven leadership conventions to select a party leader since its founding in 1961. In each instance, the leader was chosen by secret-ballot voting among delegates. The results of these votes are listed below. The leaders of the party's predecessors, the Co-operative Commonwealth Federation (Manitoba Section) and the Independent Labour Party (Manitoba) had all been elected unopposed.

== 1961 leadership convention ==
(Held in Winnipeg, Manitoba, on November 4, 1961)

Candidate	Result
Russell Paulley	winner
Cliff Matthews	.
Hans Fries	.

Paulley's victory was reported in the Winnipeg Free Press on November 6, 1961. The numerical totals were not released, but it is generally accepted that Paulley won by a significant majority. In 1968, he was challenged for the party leadership by fellow legislator Sidney Green.

== 1968 leadership challenge ==
(Held in Winnipeg, Manitoba on November 3, 1968)

Candidate	Votes	%
Russell Paulley	213	55.91
Sidney Green	168	44.09
Total Valid Votes	381	100.00

(Results taken from The Globe and Mail, 4 November 1968.)

Paulley resigned as party leader in 1969.

== 1969 leadership convention ==
(Held in Winnipeg, Manitoba on June 7, 1969)

Candidate	Votes	%
Edward Schreyer	506	74.08
Sidney Green	177	25.92
Total Valid Votes	683	100.00

(Results taken from The Globe and Mail, 9 June 1969.)

Schreyer resigned as party leader in January 1979, after being appointed Governor General of Canada on the advice of Prime Minister Pierre Trudeau. In the same month, Howard Pawley was chosen as interim leader of the NDP's legislative caucus, defeating Sidney Green and Saul Cherniack in a closed-session vote.

== 1979 leadership convention ==
(Held in Winnipeg, Manitoba on November 4, 1979)

Candidate	Votes	%
Howard Pawley	467	63.36
Muriel Smith	217	29.44
Russell Doern	53	7.19
Total Valid Votes	737	100.00

A fourth candidate, Nick Ternette, withdrew from the contest on November 2, 1979, and backed Muriel Smith.

(Results taken from The Globe and Mail, 5 November 1979).

Pawley resigned as leader in 1988, after his government lost a vote of confidence in the legislature. He continued to serve as premier in a caretaker government, and the NDP held a snap leadership convention in the opening weeks of the 1988 provincial election.

== 1988 leadership convention ==
(Held in Winnipeg, Manitoba on March 30, 1988)

First ballot:

Candidate	Votes	%
Gary Doer	631	37.94
Len Harapiak	543	32.65
Andy Anstett	317	19.06
Maureen Hemphill	167	10.04
Conrad Santos	5	0.30
Total Valid Votes	1,663	100.00

Hemphill and Santos both fell below the 15% quota required to stay on the ballot and were eliminated. Hemphill supported Anstett on the second ballot.

Second ballot:

Candidate	Votes	%
Gary Doer	744	44.93
Len Harapiak	622	37.56
Andy Anstett	290	17.51
Total Valid Votes	1,656	100.00

Anstett was eliminated. Both Anstett and Hemphill supported Harapiak on the third ballot.

Third ballot:

Candidate	Votes	%
Gary Doer	835	50.64
Len Harapiak	814	49.36
Total Valid Votes	1,649	100.00

(Results taken from The Globe and Mail and Winnipeg Free Press, 31 March 1988.)

Gary Doer led the Manitoba NDP until 2009 and served as premier of Manitoba from 1999 until 2009.

== 2009 leadership convention ==
(Held in Winnipeg, Manitoba on October 17, 2009)

Candidate	Votes	%
Greg Selinger	1,317	65.75
Steve Ashton	685	34.20
Total Valid Votes	2,002	100.00

Greg Selinger became leader and was sworn in as Premier on October 19, 2009.

== 2015 leadership convention ==
(Held in Winnipeg, Manitoba on March 8, 2015)

The leadership election was called by Selinger as a test of his leadership following a caucus revolt. First ballot

Candidate	Votes	%
Greg Selinger	612	36.02
Theresa Oswald	575	33.84
Steve Ashton	502	29.54
Total Valid Votes	1,699	100.00

Ashton eliminated. Releases his delegates, did not publicly endorse another candidate

Second ballot

Candidate	Votes	%
Greg Selinger	759	50.93
Theresa Oswald	726	48.72
Total Valid Votes	1,490	100.00

== 2017 leadership convention ==
(Held in Winnipeg, Manitoba on September 16, 2017)

Candidate	Votes	%
Wab Kinew	728	74.3
Steve Ashton	253	25.7
Total Valid Votes	981	100.00

== See also ==
- Progressive Conservative Party of Manitoba leadership elections
- Manitoba Liberal Party leadership elections
