= James Ferguson (Canadian politician) =

Canadian politician

James Robert Ferguson (born August 19, 1925 in Gladstone, Manitoba – February 26, 2013) was a farmer and politician in Manitoba, Canada. He was a Progressive Conservative member of the Legislative Assembly of Manitoba from 1969 to 1981 for the riding of Gladstone.

The son of Thomas Ferguson and Violet Power, Ferguson received his formal education in the Manitoba school system, and did not attend university. He was active in freemasonry. In 1946, he married June Collins. He operated a farm in the Helston district.

He was elected to the Manitoba legislature for the riding of Gladstone in the 1969 election, defeating incumbent Liberal Nelson Shoemaker by 417 votes. He was re-elected by a greater margin in the 1973 election, and again in the 1977 election as the Tories formed government under Sterling Lyon. Ferguson was not appointed to Lyon's cabinet. He retired from politics in 1981, citing a family illness. Ferguson later returned to farming.

He died at Third Crossing Manor in Gladstone at the age of 87.
