= Wally Johannson =

Canadian politician (1936–2025)

Member of the Manitoba Legislative Assembly for St. Matthews
- In office 1969–1977
- Preceded by: Robert Steen
- Succeeded by: Len Domino

Personal details
- Born: April 10, 1936 Arborg, Manitoba, Canada
- Died: September 2, 2025 (aged 89) Gimli, Manitoba, Canada
- Party: New Democratic Party of Manitoba
- Education: University of Manitoba
- Profession: Teacher

Thorkell Wallace Johannson (April 10, 1936 – September 2, 2025) was a Canadian politician. He was a New Democratic member of the Legislative Assembly of Manitoba from 1969 to 1977.

== Life and career ==
Born in Arborg, Manitoba on April 10, 1936, the son of Thorkell Johannson and Gudrun Sigvaldason, Johannson was educated at the University of Manitoba and worked as a high-school history teacher before entering political life. He was a member of the Manitoba Historical Society and the Icelandic Canadian Club, among other voluntary organizations. He was the victim of a home invasion in early 1969 and was wounded in a shotgun blast. In 1970, Johannson married Cheryl Taychuk.

Johannson was first elected to the Manitoba legislature in the 1969 provincial election, defeating incumbent Progressive Conservative MLA and future Winnipeg mayor Robert Steen in the riding of St. Matthews. He was re-elected with an increased majority in the election of 1973.

He did not serve in the cabinet of Edward Schreyer. In the 1977 election, he lost his seat to Tory candidate Len Domino by 124 votes. He returned to educational work after his defeat.

Johannson was initially an ally of Schreyer but became more closely associated with leadership contender Sidney Green as the decade progressed. He attended an early meeting of Green's Progressive Party in 1981, though his loyalty to the NDP ultimately stopped him from joining.

Johannson died at a care home in Gimli, Manitoba, on September 2, 2025, at the age of 89.
