= Donald Craik =

Canadian politician

Deputy Premier of Manitoba
- In office 1977–1981
- Premier: Sterling Lyon

Minister of Energy and Mines and Minister responsible for Manitoba Forestry Resources Ltd.
- In office 1979–1981
- Premier: Sterling Lyon

Minister of Finance and Minister responsible for Manitoba Hydro
- In office 1977–1981
- Premier: Sterling Lyon
- Preceded by: Saul Miller
- Succeeded by: Brian Ransom

Minister of Youth and Education
- In office 1968–1969
- Premier: Walter Weir
- Preceded by: George Johnson
- Succeeded by: Saul Miller

Minister of Mines and Natural Resources
- In office 1967–1968
- Premier: Walter Weir

Member of the Legislative Assembly of Manitoba for Riel St. Vital (1966-1969)
- In office 1966–1981
- Preceded by: Fred Groves (St. Vital)
- Succeeded by: Doreen Dodick (Riel)

Personal details
- Born: August 26, 1931 Baldur, Manitoba, Canada
- Died: September 2, 1985 (aged 54) Clearwater Bay, Ontario, Canada
- Party: Progressive Conservative Party of Manitoba
- Education: University of Manitoba, University of Minnesota
- Profession: engineer

Donald William Craik (August 26, 1931 – September 2, 1985) was a politician in Manitoba, Canada. He was a Progressive Conservative member of the Legislative Assembly of Manitoba from 1966 to 1981, and served as a cabinet minister in the governments of Walter Weir and Sterling Lyon.

== Personal life ==
Born in Baldur, Manitoba, to Ira Donald Craik (1890-1981) and Cordelia Bella Mae Young (1896-1981), Donald William Craik was raised at Greenway, in the Rural Municipality of Argyle.

Craik's grandfather, William Craik (1849-1929), was a storekeeper who built Craik’s General Store in 1909 in Greenway. Ira Craik operated the store from 1925 to 1975. In 2012, the building was identified as a significant heritage asset by the Baldur-Argyle Heritage Group.

Donald Craik earned his Bachelor of Science degree in engineering at the University of Manitoba, and his Master of Mechanical Engineering at the University of Minnesota. After his graduation, he worked as a mechanical engineer and associate professor of Mechanical Engineering at UManitoba.

He was the chairman of the St. Vital School Board from 1962 to 1964, and director of the Manitoba Research Council from 1964 to 1966. Craik also worked as a consulting engineer in Winnipeg from 1966 until his death.

He married Shirley Hill and they had three children: Judy (1958), Polly (1961), and Donna (1964). Shirley later remarried to Henry Duckworth.

During the early 1970s, Craik opened an answering service business called Fine Line Telephone Answering and Secretarial Services.

He was a member of the board of trustees of Crescent Fort Rouge United Church.

He died at his cottage at Clearwater Bay, Ontario, in 1985, at the relatively young age of 54. He had previously suffered a heart attack in the 1970s.

== Political career ==
Craik was elected to the Manitoba legislature in the provincial election of 1966, scoring a relatively easy victory in the Winnipeg riding of St. Vital. Despite his youth and relative inexperience, Premier Walter Weir appointed him to cabinet on November 7, 1967, as Minister of Mines and Natural Resources. On September 24, 1968, he was named Minister of Youth and Education with responsibility for the Public Libraries Act and the Legislative Library Act.

As education minister, Craik passed legislation allowing aboriginal Canadians to vote (and be elected to) local school boards. He credited a private member's bill from New Democratic Party MLA Sidney Green as the inspiration for this legislation.

His first tenure in cabinet proved short-lived, as the Tories lost the 1969 election to the NDP. Craik himself defeated New Democratic challenger James Buchanan by only 29 votes in the redistributed riding of Riel. In the 1973 election, he defeated future cabinet minister Wilson Parasiuk by a slightly greater margin.

The Tories returned to power under Sterling Lyon in the 1977 election, and Craik was re-elected over NDP candidate Doreen Dodick by almost 4,000 votes. On October 24, 1977, he was appointed Minister of Finance, Chairman of the Manitoba Energy Council, and minister responsible for Manitoba Hydro. He held these positions until January 16, 1981, and also served as Chairman of the Treasury Board from October 20, 1978, to November 23, 1979, and Minister of Energy and Mines with responsibility for Manitoba Forestry Resources Limited.

On January 16, 1981, Craik was appointed Deputy Premier of Manitoba, with responsibility for the Manitoba Energy Council and the Manitoba Development Corporation.

The Tories lost power to the NDP in the 1981 election, and Craik personally lost to Doreen Dodick by 242 votes in a rematch from 1977.

== Honours and legacy ==
In 1977, Craik received the Queen Elizabeth II Silver Jubilee Medal.

There is currently a Donald W. Craik Engineering Library at the University of Manitoba, which also once offered a Don Craik Memorial Scholarship.
