= William Jenkins (Canadian politician) =

Canadian politician

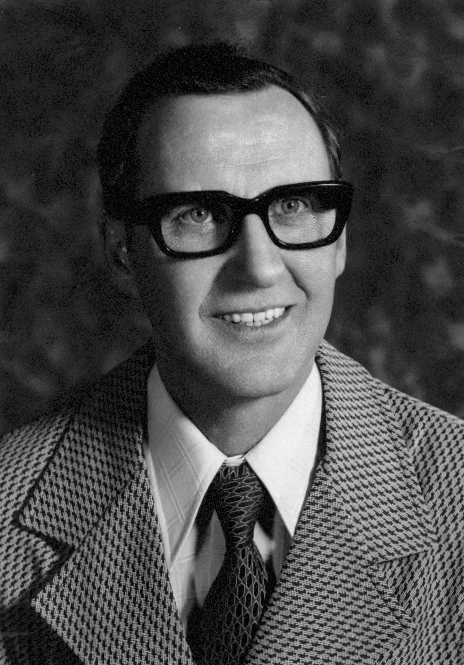
William Jenkins - 1969

William Walter Jenkins (November 10, 1921, in Inwood, Manitoba – March 7, 1995) was a politician in Manitoba, Canada. He served as a New Democratic member of the Legislative Assembly of Manitoba from 1969 to 1981.

Jenkins was raised in the Souris region. He served with the Royal Winnipeg Rifles and saw combat with the Canadian Scottish Regiment in World War II, and was wounded in action after the D-Day invasion in the city of Caen, France. He married Elizabeth Ineson of Lancaster, Lancashire England and they subsequently had three children, Linda, Ross and Terry after returning home to Canada where he was educated at the University of Manitoba, and later worked as a journeyman carpenter and car repair estimator for the C.P.R.

He was a member of the Winnipeg School Board No.1 from 1962 to 1970, and was also involved in Jubilee Lodge #6 of the Carmen's Union and the Weston Shops ex-Servicemen's Association; the Royal Canadian Legion and the Red River Co-operative movement. He was active in the Cooperative Commonwealth Federation and the New Democratic Party, and often spoke of J.S. Woodsworth and Tommy Douglas as his ideological mentors.

He was elected to the Manitoba legislature in the provincial election of 1969, scoring an easy victory in the Winnipeg riding of Logan. He was re-elected in the 1973 election and the 1977 election. He did not serve in the cabinet of Edward Schreyer, but was Deputy Speaker on two occasions and served as party Whip in opposition. In the legislature, he often defended the social rights of workers and the unemployed.

In 1981, he was appointed to the Manitoba Rent Review Board and retired from politics. He and his family enjoyed their cottage at Loni Beach in Gimli after this time.

Jenkins died March 7, 1995, following a struggle of several months with colorectal cancer.
