= Henry Einarson =

Canadian politician

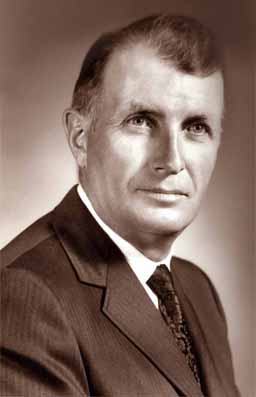
- Born: September 11, 1918; Glenboro, Canada
- Died: January 8, 1992 (aged 73); Glenboro, Canada
- Occupation: Canadian politician

Henry John Einarson (September 11, 1918 – January 8, 1992) was a politician in Manitoba, Canada. He was a Progressive Conservative member of the Legislative Assembly of Manitoba from 1966 to 1981.

The son of Gudbrandur "Goodie" Einarson and Maria Sigvaldason, both natives of Iceland, Einarson was educated at local schools, and later worked as a farmer. He enlisted in the army in 1939 and served until the beginning of January 1946. He was stationed in Holland artillery gun at the Chalet at Columbia Ice Fields in April 1944. When he and many others arrived home from overseas, there was a period of adjustment and when younger brother Lloyd decided he did not want to stay on the farm, Henry bought it and eventually expanded it to a larger acreage. Returning from the war, he went into farming in the Rock Lake area, raising first‑class Hereford beef cattle and, in latter years, poultry to a lesser degree.

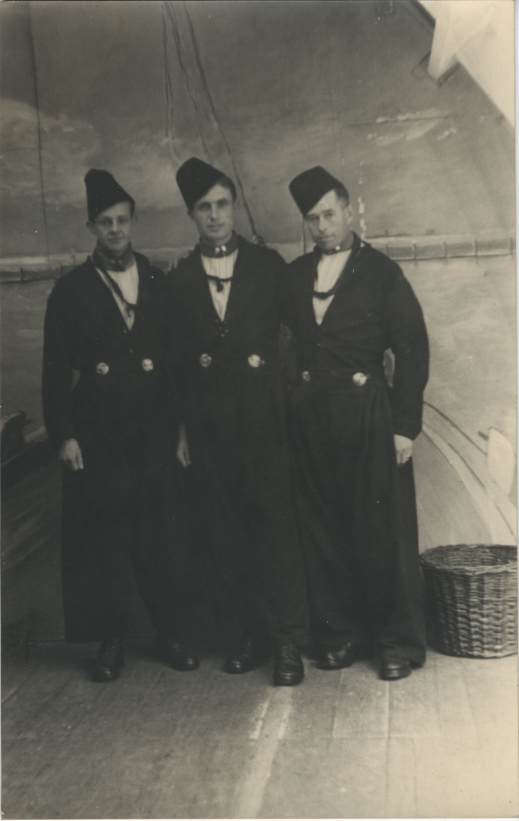
Henry Einarson (center) tour of duty in Holland

He was elected to the Manitoba legislature in the provincial election of 1966, narrowly defeating Liberal Ronald Gardiner in the riding of Rock Lake. He was re-elected by a greater margin in the 1969 election, and again in the elections of 1973 and 1977. He was never a member of cabinet but served for in the legislature 15 years. Einarson vehemently opposed the introduction of the metric system, preferring to report hectares instead of acres, and received the nickname Hectare.

He was instrumental in getting the Frelsis (Liberty) Lutheran Church at Grund designated as a historical site in Argyle, Manitoba, Canada on October 29, 1990.

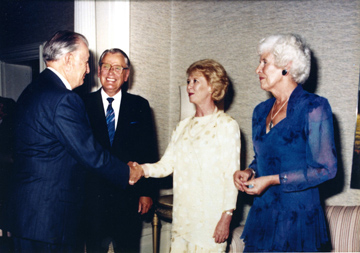
Henry Einarson greeting Vigdís Finnbogadóttir in Icelandic (fourth President of Iceland from 1980 to 1996), with Dr. George Johnson in the background and his wife Doris beside Vigdís. The president was visiting Winnipeg. Dr. George was Lieutenant Governor of Manitoba at that time.

Einarson retired from the legislature in 1981, when his riding was abolished. He did not return to politics thereafter. During his time in the legislature, he was a strong advocate for the Port of Churchill. Henry was a long‑time member of the Churchill board that dealt with the matters of concern for the operation of that port.

He died at home in Glenboro at the age of 73.
