= Crescentwood =

Defunct provincial electoral district in Manitoba, Canada

Crescentwood is a former provincial electoral district of Manitoba, Canada. It was created in 1969, abolished in 1979, re-established in 1989, and abolished again in 1999.

The Crescentwood riding was located in Winnipeg's south-central region. After its abolition, most of the riding's territory was redistributed to Lord Roberts and Fort Garry.

== Members of the Legislative Assembly ==
Name	Party	Took office	Left office
Cy Gonick	NDP	1969	1973
Harvey Patterson	NDP	1973	1975
Warren Steen	PC	1975	1981
Jim Carr	Lib	1990	1992
Avis Gray	Lib	1992	1995
Tim Sale	NDP	1995	1999

== Election results ==
=== 1969 ===
1969 Manitoba general election
Party	Candidate	Votes	%
New Democratic	Cy Gonick	2,689	41.20
Progressive Conservative	Gurney Evans	2,416	37.02
Liberal	Francis C. Muldoon	1,422	21.79
Total valid votes		6,527	–
Rejected		22	–
Eligible voters / Turnout		9,892	66.21
Source(s) Source: Manitoba. Chief Electoral Officer (1999). Statement of Votes for the 37th Provincial General Election, September 21, 1999 (PDF) (Report). Winnipeg: Elections Manitoba.

=== 1973 ===
1973 Manitoba general election
Party	Candidate	Votes	%	±%
New Democratic	Harvey Patterson	3,729	40.57	-0.63
Progressive Conservative	Lawrence Oliver "Lawrie" Pollard	3,729	40.57	3.55
Liberal	June Menzies	1,734	18.86	-2.92
Total valid votes		9,192	–	–
Rejected		245	–	
Eligible voters / Turnout		11,528	81.86	15.66
Source(s) Source: Manitoba. Chief Electoral Officer (1999). Statement of Votes for the 37th Provincial General Election, September 21, 1999 (PDF) (Report). Winnipeg: Elections Manitoba.

=== 1975 by-election ===
Manitoba provincial by-election, June 25, 1975 Election of Harvey Patterson voided
Party	Candidate	Votes	%	±%
Progressive Conservative	Warren Steen	2,780	37.68	-2.89
Liberal	Charles Huband	2,611	35.39	16.52
New Democratic	Harvey Patterson	1,987	26.93	-13.64
Total valid votes		7,378	–	–
Rejected		N/A	–	
Eligible voters / Turnout		N/A	–	–
Source(s) Source: Manitoba. Chief Electoral Officer (1999). Statement of Votes for the 37th Provincial General Election, September 21, 1999 (PDF) (Report). Winnipeg: Elections Manitoba.

=== 1977 ===
1977 Manitoba general election
Party	Candidate	Votes	%	±%
Progressive Conservative	Warren Steen	3,253	35.61	-2.07
New Democratic	Muriel Smith	3,181	34.82	7.89
Liberal	Charles Huband	2,702	29.58	-5.81
Total valid votes		9,136	–	–
Rejected		133	–	
Eligible voters / Turnout		11,588	79.99	–
Source(s) Source: Manitoba. Chief Electoral Officer (1999). Statement of Votes for the 37th Provincial General Election, September 21, 1999 (PDF) (Report). Winnipeg: Elections Manitoba.

=== 1990 ===
1990 Manitoba general election
Party	Candidate	Votes	%	±%
Liberal	Jim Carr	4,588	45.65	16.08
Progressive Conservative	Tom DeNardi	3,278	32.62	-2.99
New Democratic	Neil Cohen	2,184	21.73	-13.09
Total valid votes		10,050	–	–
Rejected		35	–	
Eligible voters / turnout		14,054	71.76	-8.23
Source(s) Source: Manitoba. Chief Electoral Officer (1999). Statement of Votes for the 37th Provincial General Election, September 21, 1999 (PDF) (Report). Winnipeg: Elections Manitoba.

=== 1992 by-election ===
Manitoba provincial by-election, September 15, 1992 Resignation of Jim Carr
Party	Candidate	Votes	%	±%
Liberal	Avis Gray	2,702	33.94	-11.71
New Democratic	Tim Sale	2,252	28.29	6.56
Progressive Conservative	Jenny Hilliard	1,990	25.00	-7.62
Progressive	Sidney Green	900	11.31	–
Reform	Ken Carver	97	1.22	–
Libertarian	Dennis Rice	19	0.24	–
Total valid votes		7,960	–	–
Rejected		N/A	–	
Eligible voters / Turnout		N/A	–	–
Liberal hold		Swing		-11.95
Source(s) Source: Manitoba. Chief Electoral Officer (1999). Statement of Votes for the 37th Provincial General Election, September 21, 1999 (PDF) (Report). Winnipeg: Elections Manitoba.

=== 1995 ===
1995 Manitoba general election
Party	Candidate	Votes	%	±%
New Democratic	Tim Sale	3,733	36.04	7.75
Progressive Conservative	Debbie Vivian	3,455	33.36	8.36
Liberal	Avis Gray	3,170	30.60	-3.34
Total valid votes		10,358	–	–
Rejected		36	–	
Eligible voters / Turnout		14,203	73.18	–
Source(s) Source: Manitoba. Chief Electoral Officer (1999). Statement of Votes for the 37th Provincial General Election, September 21, 1999 (PDF) (Report). Winnipeg: Elections Manitoba.

== See also ==
- List of Manitoba provincial electoral districts
- Canadian provincial electoral districts
