= Rock Lake (electoral district) =

Defunct provincial electoral district in Manitoba, Canada

Rock Lake was a provincial electoral district of Manitoba, Canada.

The constituency was created by redistribution in 1956, and existed from the 1958 provincial election until the 1981 election. Most of the area was merged into the constituency of Pembina.

It was located in the southern part of the province. It was bordered to the north by Souris-Lansdowne, to the east by Pembina, to the west by Turtle Mountain, and to the south by the American state of North Dakota.

== Members of the Legislative Assembly ==
Name	Party	Took office	Left office
Abram Harrison	PC	1958	1966
Henry Einarson	PC	1966	1981

== Electoral results ==
Source: Elections Manitoba

1958:

- (x)Abram Harrison(PC) 2,465
- Walter E. Clark (LP) 2,227

1959:

- (x)Abram Harrison (PC) 2,545
- Walter E. Clark (LP) 1,843
- Cyril Hamwee (CCF) 632

1962:

- Abram Harrison (PC) 2,444
- Harry Parsonage (L) 2,015
- J.A. Potter (NDP) 257

1966:

- Henry Einarson (PC) 1,835
- Ronald Gardiner (L) 1,691
- Jacob Harms (SC) 505
- Ernest Sloane (NDP) 333

1969:

- (x)Henry Einarson (PC) 3,064
- Remi Engelbert DePape (L) 1,818
- Timothy Leonard (NDP) 763

1973:

- (x)Henry Einarson (PC) 3,470
- Paul Cenerini (NDP) 1,825
- Arnold Collins (L) 1,361

1977:

- (x)Henry Einarson (PC) 4,243
- Ronald Devos (L) 1,167
- Eric Irwin (NDP) 1,029

== See also ==
- List of Manitoba provincial electoral districts
- Canadian provincial electoral districts
