= Progressive Conservative Party of Manitoba leadership elections =

The Progressive Conservative Party of Manitoba (previously known as the Conservative Party of Manitoba) has had several contested races to determine its leadership. These have all occurred by voting at delegated conventions. The results are listed below.

== 1919 Conservative leadership convention ==
(Held on November 6, 1919)

- R.G. Willis winner
- Fawcett Taylor

(Note: The vote totals were not read into the record.)

== 1922 Conservative leadership convention ==
(Held on April 5, 1922)

- Fawcett Taylor winner
- John Thomas Haig

(Note: The results were not announced. R.G. Willis was nominated as a candidate, but declined.)

== 1936 Conservative leadership convention ==
(Held on June 9, 1936)

- Errick Willis acclaimed

== 1950 Progressive Conservative leadership challenge ==
(Held in October, 1950)

- Errick Willis 188
- George Hastings 45

== 1954 Progressive Conservative leadership challenge ==
(Held on June 17, 1954)

First ballot:

- Errick Willis 118
- Dufferin Roblin 114
- J. Arthur Ross 55

Second ballot (Ross eliminated):

- Dufferin Roblin 160
- Errick Willis 123

== 1967 Progressive Conservative leadership convention ==
(Held on November 25, 1967)

First ballot:

- Walter Weir 167
- Sterling Lyon 141
- Stewart McLean 87
- George Johnson 71

Second ballot (Johnson eliminated):

- Walter Weir 220
- Sterling Lyon 170
- Stewart McLean 73

Third ballot (McLean eliminated):

- Walter Weir 280
- Sterling Lyon 183

== 1971 Progressive Conservative leadership convention ==
(Held on February 27, 1971)

- Sidney Spivak 261
- Harry Enns 215

== 1975 Progressive Conservative leadership convention ==
(Held on December 6, 1975)

- Sterling Lyon 264
- Sidney Spivak 207

== 1983 Progressive Conservative leadership convention ==
(Held on December 10, 1983)

First ballot:

- Gary Filmon 261
- Brian Ransom 217
- Clayton Manness 71

Second ballot (Manness eliminated):

- Gary Filmon 297
- Brian Ransom 251

== 2000 Progressive Conservative leadership convention ==
(Held on November 4, 2000)

- Stuart Murray acclaimed

(Note: Darren Praznik had previously withdrawn.)

== 2006 Progressive Conservative leadership convention ==
(Held on April 29, 2006 by a one member, one vote system)

- Hugh McFadyen 6,091
- Ron Schuler 1,953
- Ken Waddell 1,099

== 2012 Progressive Conservative leadership convention ==
(Held on July 30, 2012)

- Brian Pallister acclaimed

== 2021 Progressive Conservative leadership convention ==
(Held on October 30, 2021)

- Heather Stefanson 8,405
- Shelly Glover 8,042

== 2025 Progressive Conservative leadership convention ==
(Held on April 26, 2025 by a constituency-based weighted one member, one vote system)

- Obby Khan 2,198.8
- Wally Daudrich 2,163.2
