= Robert Wilson (Manitoba politician) =

Canadian politician

Robert George "Bob" Wilson (born November 2, 1934) is a former politician in Manitoba. He represented Wolseley in the Legislative Assembly of Manitoba from 1975 to 1981 as a Progressive Conservative and then independent member.

He was first elected to the assembly in a by-election held on June 25, 1975, after former Liberal leader Izzy Asper resigned his seat. Wilson was re-elected in the 1977 general election, defeating New Democrat Murdoch MacKay by 74 votes. In September 1979, he was charged with conspiracy to import and traffic in marijuana as the result of drug seizures in May and July of that year. Wilson was expelled from the Progressive Conservative caucus on November 20, 1980, and subsequently sat as an independent member. He was convicted on November 7, 1980, and sentenced to seven years in prison. His appeal to the Supreme Court of Canada was denied on June 15, 1981, and his seat in the assembly was declared vacant on June 17.

In March 2011, Ian Jackson MacDonald, who had escaped police custody in June 1980, was returned to Canada by U.S. authorities. At that time, Wilson expressed hope that information from MacDonald would exonerate him of the earlier charges. In 2014, MacDonald died; his testimony had failed to clear Wilson's name.
