= Sidney Spivak =

Canadian politician

Sidney Spivak QC

Member of the Legislative Assembly of Manitoba for River Heights
- In office June 23, 1966 – April 12, 1979
- Preceded by: Maitland Steinkopf
- Succeeded by: Gary Filmon

Personal details
- Born: Sidney Joel Spivak; May 23, 1928 Winnipeg, Manitoba, Canada
- Died: July 8, 2002 (aged 74) Winnipeg, Manitoba, Canada
- Party: Progressive Conservative Party of Manitoba
- Spouse: Mira Spivak (m. 1955)
- Children: 3
- Education: University of Manitoba (LLB); Harvard University (LLM)

Sidney Joel Spivak, QC (May 23, 1928 – July 8, 2002) was a Manitoba politician. He was a Cabinet minister in the governments of Dufferin Roblin, Walter Weir and Sterling Lyon, and was himself leader of the Progressive Conservative Party of Manitoba (PCs) from 1971 to 1975.

== Early life ==
Sidney Joel Spivak was born to Jewish parents, Malick and Rose Spivak, in Winnipeg, and was educated at the University of Manitoba and Harvard University. He worked as a barrister and became vice-president of Golden Age Beverages Limited and Mathers Investments Limited as well. In 1955, Spivak married Mira Steele; they had three children together. He was named Queen's Counsel in 1966.

== Political career ==
Spivak was first elected to the Legislative Assembly of Manitoba in the 1966 provincial election, in the riding of River Heights, which was then in far southwest Winnipeg. A Progressive Conservative, Spivak was appointed Minister of Industry and Commerce in Dufferin Roblin's government. He continued to hold this position after Walter Weir became premier in 1967.

Weir's Progressive Conservatives were defeated in the 1969 election, although Spivak was easily re-elected in his own riding. Two years later, he defeated Harry Enns by 46 votes to become the party's leader.

Ideologically, Spivak was a Red Tory (on the left of the party). He represented an urban and progressive wing within the party, and did not have the complete confidence of his caucus, which was dominated by more right-wing figures. In the 1973 election, Spivak presented himself as being to the right of Premier Edward Schreyer's New Democrats, but to the left of the Liberals under Israel Asper. He specifically rejected Asper's laissez-faire economic policies, and promised to govern as a centrist.

The Progressive Conservatives won 21 seats in the 1973 election, up one from their position at the dissolution of the assembly. Schreyer's New Democrats, however, were re-elected with a majority, and many PC members blamed Spivak for the party's loss. (Some have suggested that the Tory defeat was due in part to antisemitism. This interpretation has never been verified, however, and has been rejected by some prominent Jewish figures in Manitoba.)

In 1975, former minister Sterling Lyon, who had not held office since 1969 at that point, challenged Spivak for the Progressive Conservative leadership. This challenge was extremely divisive, pitting Spivak's left-leaning ideology against Lyon's conservatism and dividing the PC membership accordingly. There have also been suggestions that some of Lyon's supporters conducted an antisemitic "whispering campaign" against Spivak, suggesting that the party would be unable to form government under a Jewish leader. Lyon, however, had several prominent Jews on his leadership campaign team.

When the delegates gathered on December 6, Lyon defeated Spivak by 57 votes. Shortly after the vote, Spivak claimed that the party would have difficulty being elected on a right-wing platform. Lyon led the PCs to victory at the 1977 election, however, and Spivak was appointed as a Minister without Portfolio in the Lyon cabinet (also becoming co-chair of a Task Force on Government Organization and Economy). On October 20, 1978, he became the Minister of Government Services.

Spivak resigned from the Manitoba legislature in 1979. He ran for the Progressive Conservative Party of Canada in the federal riding of Winnipeg—Fort Garry in that year's federal election. He lost to Liberal Lloyd Axworthy, later a high-ranking federal cabinet minister, by 485 out of 45,757 votes.

== Post-politics ==
After his defeat in the 1979 federal election, Spivak did not seek further elected office and returned to business full-time. In the late 1980s and early 1990s, he served as chair of the Canada-Israel Committee; this organization opposed the Oslo Peace Accord of 1993, although Spivak himself was subsequently a promoter of peace in the Middle East. He also served on the Churchill Regional Health Authority Board in the late 1990s. Spivak wanted to be appointed Lieutenant Governor of Manitoba in 1993 (he would have succeeded George Johnson, his former ministerial colleague in the Roblin and Weir governments), but Prime Minister Brian Mulroney, through Governor General Ray Hnatyshyn, appointed Yvon Dumont instead.

He served on the board of governors of the University of Manitoba and on the board of directors for the Saint Boniface Hospital.

Sidney Spivak died of a heart attack in Winnipeg in 2002. His widow Mira Spivak was a member of the Senate of Canada from Manitoba from 1986 until she took mandatory retirement on her seventy-fifth birthday in 2009.
