= Sterling Lyon =

Premier of Manitoba from 1977 to 1981

The Honourable Sterling Rufus Lyon PC OC OM QC

17th Premier of Manitoba
- In office October 24, 1977 – November 30, 1981
- Monarch: Elizabeth II
- Lieutenant Governor: Francis L. Jobin; Pearl McGonigal
- Preceded by: Edward Schreyer
- Succeeded by: Howard Pawley

Member of the Legislative Assembly of Manitoba for Charleswood
- In office October 11, 1977 – March 18, 1986
- Preceded by: Arthur Moug
- Succeeded by: Jim Ernst

Member of the Legislative Assembly of Manitoba for Souris-Killarney
- In office November 7, 1976 – October 11, 1977
- Preceded by: Earl McKellar
- Succeeded by: Brian Ransom

Member of the Legislative Assembly of Manitoba for Fort Garry
- In office June 16, 1958 – June 25, 1969
- Preceded by: L. Raymond Fennell
- Succeeded by: Bud Sherman

Personal details
- Born: January 30, 1927 Windsor, Ontario, Canada
- Died: December 16, 2010 (aged 83) Winnipeg, Manitoba, Canada
- Party: Progressive Conservative
- Spouse: Barbara Jean Mayers (m. 1953)
- Children: 5
- Education: University of Manitoba (LL.B.)
- Occupation: lawyer
- Profession: politician
- Cabinet: Attorney-General (1958–1963); Minister of Municipal Affairs (1960–1961); Minister of Public Utilities (1961–1963); Minister of Mines and Natural Resources (1963–1966); Minister of Public Utilities (1964); Attorney General (1966–1969); Minister of Tourism and Recreation Commission, Northern Affairs (1966–1968); Leader of the Opposition (1981–1983)

Sterling Rufus Lyon PC OC OM QC (January 30, 1927 – December 16, 2010) was a Canadian lawyer, cabinet minister, and the 17th premier of Manitoba from 1977 to 1981. His government introduced several fiscally-conservative measures, and was sometimes seen as a local version of the government of Margaret Thatcher in the United Kingdom. He also successfully fought for the inclusion of the notwithstanding clause in the Canadian Charter of Rights and Freedoms.

== Early life ==
Born in Windsor, Ontario, the son of David Rufus Lyon and Ella Mae Cuthbert, he moved with his family to Manitoba at a young age and grew up in Portage la Prairie. Lyon graduated from Portage Collegiate Institute in 1944, where he served as vice-president of the school's student council.

== Education and legal career ==
Sterling Lyon graduated from United College (now the University of Winnipeg) in 1948, and received an LL.B from the Manitoba Law School in 1953. For four years after completing his legal education, he worked as a Crown attorney. In 1953, he married Barbara Jean Mayers.

== Political career ==
Lyon was first elected to the Legislative Assembly of Manitoba in 1958, in the south-central Winnipeg riding of Fort Garry, running as a Progressive Conservative. Lyon defeated incumbent Liberal-Progressive MLA L. Raymond Fennell, and was subsequently named as Attorney General in Dufferin Roblin's minority government.

Roblin's Tories won a majority in 1959, and Lyon was easily re-elected in his own riding. He continued to serve as Attorney General, and also served as Minister of Municipal Affairs (September 30, 1960 – October 25, 1961) and Minister of Public Utilities (October 31, 1961 – June 12, 1963).

On December 9, 1963, Lyon was shifted from the Attorney General's position to the Ministry of Mines and Natural Resources. He held this position until June 22, 1966, and briefly served as Public Utilities minister again in mid-1964. Lyon became Attorney General again after the 1966 election, and also served as Minister of Tourism and Recreation from 1968 to 1969. He was re-elected easily in 1962 or 1966. He served a total of nine years as Attorney General.

When Roblin moved to federal politics in 1967, Lyon was one of four candidates who sought to replace him. He was defeated by Walter Weir on the third ballot, and did not seek re-election in 1969. Although Weir and Lyon were both politically to the right of Roblin, they represented different constituencies in the party: Weir was a rural populist, Lyon a supporter of urban business development.

In February 1969, Lyon expressed skepticism about the wisdom of codifying common law rights in a written constitution.

Lyon ran for the House of Commons of Canada in 1974 for the federal Progressive Conservatives, narrowly losing the riding of Winnipeg South to Liberal incumbent James A. Richardson.

The following year, Lyon returned to provincial politics to challenge Sidney Spivak for the Progressive Conservative Party's leadership. Spivak, a former cabinet colleague of Lyon's who had been elected party leader in 1971, was a Red Tory opposed by many of the more conservative figures within his caucus. The right wing of the party consolidated around Lyon's challenge, and he defeated Spivak by fifty-seven votes at a very divisive leadership convention in December 1975. Lyon returned to the legislature for the rural riding of Souris-Killarney in a 1976 by-election.

=== Premier of Manitoba ===
In 1977, Lyon transferred to the west Winnipeg seat of Charleswood. He led the Progressive Conservative Party to an upset victory over Edward Schreyer's New Democrats), picking up 12 seats for a total of 33. Lyon's government cut spending in several departments and reduced investment in several social programs sponsored by the NDP. In other respects, the Lyon government's commitment to "small government" was ambivalent—it was, for instance, highly supportive of large-scale energy-development projects. Roblin has argued that the Lyon government's right-wing reputation was undeserved, but few others have as yet agreed with this assessment.

Lyon was also an initial opponent of Prime Minister Pierre Trudeau's constitutional plans, and subsequently became a leading supporter of the notwithstanding clause provision. He also fought, unsuccessfully, to have property rights entrenched in the Constitution of Canada.

Lyon's PCs lost government to the NDP, now led by Howard Pawley, in 1981, after only one term in office. The Tories lost 11 seats, almost as much as they had won four years earlier.

=== Post-premiership ===
Lyon acted as Leader of the Opposition for two years and fought Pawley's proposals to entrench the rights of Franco-Manitobans in the Constitution. In 1983, Lyon stepped down as Tory leader and was replaced by Gary Filmon. Lyon retired from politics when he did not run for re-election in the 1986 provincial election.

== Post-political career ==
He was appointed to the Manitoba Court of Appeal in 1986. He served there until retiring in 2002. Sterling Lyon died on December 16, 2010, following a brief illness, at the age of 83.

== Distinctions and awards ==
He was sworn into the Privy Council on April 17, 1982, by Governor General Edward Schreyer on the advice of Pierre Trudeau.

In 2004, Lyon was chosen as the University of Winnipeg's annual recipient of the "Distinguished Alumnus Award". In 2009, he was made an Officer of the Order of Canada "for his contributions as a judge and long-time politician in Manitoba, where, as premier, he led the expansion of community-based health and social services, and modernized governmental financial procedures".

The Sterling Lyon Parkway in Winnipeg was completed and opened to traffic in November 2005. The route was added during the construction of the Kenaston Underpass. The Sterling Lyon Parkway, a new east–west road, has replaced a section of Wilkes Avenue near the underpass.

== Legacy ==
Though his premiership was short, it's been argued that those years left an enduring legacy. An unsigned editorial in the Winnipeg Free Press argued:

The other major pillar of Mr. Lyon's legacy – the inclusion of the notwithstanding clause in the Charter of Rights and Freedoms as a defence of the supremacy of elected parliaments over unelected courts – was controversial when he first supported it and remains so today. He feared that provincial and federal parliaments would themselves cede their power to the courts to avoid controversial issues, a fear that has proved well founded.

Sterling Lyon Parkway in Winnipeg was named in his honour.
