= 32nd Manitoba Legislature =

The members of the 32nd Manitoba Legislature were elected in the Manitoba general election held in November 1981. The legislature sat from February 25, 1982, to February 11, 1986.

The New Democratic Party led by Howard Pawley formed the government.

Sterling Lyon of the Progressive Conservative Party was Leader of the Opposition. Gary Filmon became opposition leader in 1983 after Lyon resigned as party leader.

Jim Walding served as speaker for the assembly.

There were four sessions of the 32nd Legislature:

Session	Start	End
1st	February 25, 1982	June 30, 1982
2nd	December 2, 1982	February 27, 1984
3rd	April 12, 1984	March 6, 1985
4th	March 7, 1985	July 11, 1985

Pearl McGonigal was Lieutenant Governor of Manitoba.

== Members of the Assembly ==
The following members were elected to the assembly in 1981:

Member	Electoral district	Party	First elected / previously elected	No.# of term(s)	Notes
James Downey	Arthur	Progressive Conservative	1977	2nd term	
Ric Nordman	Assiniboia	Progressive Conservative	1981	1st term	
Leonard Evans	Brandon East	NDP	1969	4th term	
Henry Nelson Carroll	Brandon West	NDP	1981	1st term	Until August 19, 1982
Henry Nelson Carroll	Brandon West	Independent	1981	1st term	From August 19, 1982
Conrad Santos	Burrows	NDP	1981	1st term	
Sterling Lyon	Charleswood	Progressive Conservative	1958, (Note: Fort Garry) 1976	7th term*	
Jay Cowan	Churchill	NDP	1977	2nd term	
Peter Fox	Concordia	NDP	1966	5th term	
John Plohman	Dauphin	NDP	1981	1st term	
Brian Corrin	Ellice	NDP	1977	2nd term	
Russell Doern	Elmwood	NDP	1966	5th term	Until March 7, 1984
Russell Doern	Elmwood	Independent	1966	5th term	From March 7, 1984
Albert Driedger	Emerson	Progressive Conservative	1977	2nd term	
Jerry Storie	Flin Flon	NDP	1981	1st term	
Bud Sherman	Fort Garry	Progressive Conservative	1969	4th term	Until August 5, 1984
Charles Birt (1984)	Fort Garry	Progressive Conservative	1984	1st term	From October 7, 1984
Roland Penner	Fort Rouge	NDP	1981	1st term	
John Bucklaschuk	Gimli	NDP	1981	1st term	
Charlotte Oleson	Gladstone	Progressive Conservative	1981	1st term	
Don Scott	Inkster	NDP	1981	1st term	
Bill Uruski	Interlake	NDP	1969	4th term	
Mary Beth Dolin	Kildonan	NDP	1981	1st term	Died in office April 9, 1985
Martin Dolin (1985)	Kildonan	NDP	1985	1st term	From October 1, 1985
Gerrie Hammond	Kirkfield Park	Progressive Conservative	1981	1st term	
Samuel Uskiw	Lac du Bonnet	NDP	1966	5th term	
Harry Enns	Lakeside	Progressive Conservative	1966	5th term	
Robert Banman	La Verendrye	Progressive Conservative	1973	3rd term	
Maureen Hemphill	Logan	NDP	1981	1st term	
Dave Blake	Minnedosa	Progressive Conservative	1971	4th term	
Clayton Manness	Morris	Progressive Conservative	1981	1st term	
Abe Kovnats	Niakwa	Progressive Conservative	1977	2nd term	
Muriel Smith	Osborne	NDP	1981	1st term	
Donald Orchard	Pembina	Progressive Conservative	1977	2nd term	
Lloyd Hyde	Portage la Prairie	Progressive Conservative	1977	2nd term	
Gerard Lecuyer	Radisson	NDP	1981	1st term	
Arnold Brown	Rhineland	Progressive Conservative	1973	3rd term	
Doreen Dodick	Riel	NDP	1981	1st term	
Phil Eyler	River East	NDP	1981	1st term	
Warren Steen	River Heights	Progressive Conservative	1975	3rd term	
Wally McKenzie	Roblin-Russell	Progressive Conservative	1966	5th term	
Vic Schroeder	Rossmere	NDP	1979	2nd term	
Elijah Harper	Rupertsland	NDP	1981	1st term	
Laurent Desjardins	St. Boniface	NDP	1959, (Note: First elected as a Liberal Progressive) 1974	7th term*	
Al Mackling	St. James	NDP	1969, 1981	2nd term*	
Donald Malinowski	St. Johns	NDP	1969	4th term	
Gerry Mercier	St. Norbert	Progressive Conservative	1977	2nd term	
Jim Walding	St. Vital	NDP	1971	4th term	
Pete Adam	Ste. Rose	NDP	1971	4th term	
Howard Pawley	Selkirk	NDP	1969	4th term	
Eugene Kostyra	Seven Oaks	NDP	1981	1st term	
Andy Anstett	Springfield	NDP	1981	1st term	
Frank Johnston	Sturgeon Creek	Progressive Conservative	1969	4th term	
Douglas Gourlay	Swan River	Progressive Conservative	1977	2nd term	
Harry Harapiak	The Pas	NDP	1981	1st term	
Steve Ashton	Thompson	NDP	1981	1st term	
Wilson Parasiuk	Transcona	NDP	1977	2nd term	
Brian Ransom	Turtle Mountain	Progressive Conservative	1977	2nd term	
Gary Filmon	Tuxedo	Progressive Conservative	1979	2nd term	
Harry Graham	Virden	Progressive Conservative	1969	5th term	
Myrna Phillips	Wolseley	NDP	1981	1st term	

== By-elections ==
By-elections were held to replace members for various reasons:

Electoral district	Member elected	Affiliation	Election date	Reason
Fort Garry	Charles Birt	Progressive Conservative	October 2, 1984	L Sherman resigned August 5, 1984, to run in federal election
Kildonan	Martin Dolin	NDP	October 1, 1985	M B Dolin died April 9, 1985
