= 33rd Manitoba Legislature =

The members of the 33rd Manitoba Legislature were elected in the Manitoba general election held in March 1986. The legislature sat from May 8, 1986, to March 9, 1988.

The New Democratic Party led by Howard Pawley formed the government.

Gary Filmon of the Progressive Conservative Party was Leader of the Opposition.

Myrna Phillips served as speaker for the assembly.

The government was defeated on March 8, 1988, when one of its members, Jim Walding, voted with the opposition against the budget.

Although the Pawley government had supported the Meech Lake Accord, a resolution on the Accord had not been put before the legislature before the government was defeated.

There were three sessions of the 33rd Legislature:

Session	Start	End
1st	May 8, 1986	February 25, 1987
2nd	February 26, 1987	February 10, 1988
3rd	February 11, 1988	March 8, 1988

Pearl McGonigal was Lieutenant Governor of Manitoba until December 11, 1986, when George Johnson became lieutenant governor.

== Members of the Assembly ==
The following members were elected to the assembly in 1986:

Member	Electoral district	Party	First elected / previously elected	No.# of term(s)	Notes
James Downey	Arthur	Progressive Conservative	1977	3rd term	
Ric Nordman	Assiniboia	Progressive Conservative	1981	2nd term	
Leonard Evans	Brandon East	NDP	1969	5th term	
James C. McCrae	Brandon West	Progressive Conservative	1986	1st term	
Conrad Santos	Burrows	NDP	1981	2nd term	
Jim Ernst	Charleswood	Progressive Conservative	1986	1st term	
Jay Cowan	Churchill	NDP	1977	3rd term	
Gary Doer	Concordia	NDP	1986	1st term	
John Plohman	Dauphin	NDP	1981	2nd term	
Harvey Smith	Ellice	NDP	1986	1st term	
Jim Maloway	Elmwood	NDP	1986	1st term	
Albert Driedger	Emerson	Progressive Conservative	1977	3rd term	
Jerry Storie	Flin Flon	NDP	1981	2nd term	
Charlie Birt	Fort Garry	Progressive Conservative	1984	2nd term	
Roland Penner	Fort Rouge	NDP	1981	2nd term	
John Bucklaschuk	Gimli	NDP	1981	2nd term	
Charlotte Oleson	Gladstone	Progressive Conservative	1981	2nd term	
Don Scott	Inkster	NDP	1981	2nd term	
Bill Uruski	Interlake	NDP	1969	5th term	
Marty Dolin	Kildonan	NDP	1985	2nd term	
Gerrie Hammond	Kirkfield Park	Progressive Conservative	1981	2nd term	
Clarence Baker	Lac du Bonnet	NDP	1986	1st term	
Harry Enns	Lakeside	Progressive Conservative	1966	6th term	
Helmut Pankratz	La Verendrye	Progressive Conservative	1986	1st term	
Maureen Hemphill	Logan	NDP	1981	2nd term	
Dave Blake	Minnedosa	Progressive Conservative	1971	5th term	
Clayton Manness	Morris	Progressive Conservative	1981	2nd term	
Abe Kovnats	Niakwa	Progressive Conservative	1977	3rd term	
Muriel Smith	Osborne	NDP	1981	2nd term	
Donald Orchard	Pembina	Progressive Conservative	1977	3rd term	
Ed Connery	Portage la Prairie	Progressive Conservative	1986	1st term	
Gerard Lecuyer	Radisson	NDP	1981	2nd term	
Arnold Brown	Rhineland	Progressive Conservative	1973	4th term	
Gerry Ducharme	Riel	Progressive Conservative	1986	1st term	
Bonnie Mitchelson	River East	Progressive Conservative	1986	1st term	
Sharon Carstairs	River Heights	Liberal	1986	1st term	
Len Derkach	Roblin-Russell	Progressive Conservative	1986	1st term	
Vic Schroeder	Rossmere	NDP	1979	3rd term	
Elijah Harper	Rupertsland	NDP	1981	2nd term	
Laurent Desjardins	St. Boniface	NDP	1959, (Note: First elected as a Liberal Progressive) 1974	8th term*	
Al Mackling	St. James	NDP	1969, 1981	3rd term*	
Judy Wasylycia-Leis	St. Johns	NDP	1986	1st term	
Gerry Mercier	St. Norbert	Progressive Conservative	1977	3rd term	
Jim Walding	St. Vital	NDP	1971	5th term	
Glen Cummings	Ste. Rose	Progressive Conservative	1986	1st term	
Howard Pawley	Selkirk	NDP	1969	5th term	
Eugene Kostyra	Seven Oaks	NDP	1981	2nd term	
Gilles Roch	Springfield	Progressive Conservative	1986	1st term	
Frank Johnston	Sturgeon Creek	Progressive Conservative	1969	5th term	
Leonard Harapiak	Swan River	NDP	1986	1st term	
Harry Harapiak	The Pas	NDP	1981	2nd term	
Steve Ashton	Thompson	NDP	1981	2nd term	
Wilson Parasiuk	Transcona	NDP	1977	3rd term	
Denis Rocan	Turtle Mountain	Progressive Conservative	1986	1st term	
Gary Filmon	Tuxedo	Progressive Conservative	1979	3rd term	
Glen Findlay	Virden	Progressive Conservative	1986	1st term	
Myrna Phillips	Wolseley	NDP	1981	2nd term	

== By-elections ==
None
