= 2nd Manitoba Legislature =

- Mar. 31, 1875 – Nov. 11, 1878

Parliament leaders
- Premier: Robert Atkinson Davis; Dec. 3, 1874 – Oct. 16, 1878

Party caucuses
- Government: Non-partisan

Legislative Assembly
- Speaker of the Assembly: Joseph Dubuc; Mar. 31, 1875 – Dec. 1, 1878
- Members: 26 MLA seats

Legislative Council
- Speaker of the Council: John Harrison O'Donnell; Mar. 31, 1875 – May. 14, 1875
- Colin Inkster; Jan. 18, 1876 – Feb. 4, 1876
- Counsellors: 7 counsellor seats

Sovereign
- Monarch: Queen Victoria; Jun. 20, 1837 – Jan. 22, 1901
- Lieutenant governor: Alexander Morris; Dec. 2, 1872 – Oct. 7, 1877
- Joseph-Édouard Cauchon; Oct. 8, 1877 – Sep. 28, 1882

Sessions
- 1st session 31 Mar 1875 – 14 May 1875
- 2nd session 18 Jan 1876 – 4 Feb 1876
- 3rd session 30 Jan 1877 – 28 Feb 1877
- 4th session 10 Jan 1878 – 2 Feb 1878
← 1st	→ 3rd

The members of the 2nd Manitoba Legislature were elected in the Manitoba general election held in December 1874. The legislature sat from March 31, 1875, to November 11, 1878.

Premier Robert Atkinson Davis with the support of Joseph Royal was able to form a minority government. Davis offered a cabinet seat to John Norquay, which won him the support of moderate English-speaking members.

The Legislative Council of Manitoba was abolished. In 1874, representatives of the provincial government requested additional funding from the federal government in Ottawa. The federal cabinet agreed on the condition that the legislative council be abolished. The council itself rejected two bills calling for its abolition. Finally, in 1876, a sufficient number of members of the council were persuaded by the lieutenant-governor to support the bill.

Joseph Dubuc served as speaker for the assembly.

There were four sessions of the 2nd Legislature:

Session	Start	End
1st	March 31, 1875	May 14, 1875
2nd	January 18, 1876	February 4, 1876
3rd	January 30, 1877	February 28, 1877
4th	January 10, 1878	February 2, 1878

Alexander Morris was Lieutenant Governor of Manitoba until October 8, 1877, when Joseph-Édouard Cauchon became lieutenant governor.

== Members of the Assembly ==
The following members were elected to the assembly in 1874:

Member	Electoral district	Affiliation	First elected / previously elected	No.# of term(s)	Notes
Felix Chenier	Baie St. Paul	Independent	1874	1st term	
John Taylor	Headingly	Independent	1870, 1874	2nd term*	
James Cowan	High Bluff	Opposition	1874	1st term	
John Sutherland	Kildonan	Opposition	1870	2nd term	
Angus McKay	Lake Manitoba	Independent	1870	2nd term	
James McKay (1877)	Lake Manitoba	Independent	1877	1st term	
Francis Evans Cornish	Poplar Point	Opposition	1874	1st term	
Kenneth McKenzie	Portage la Prairie	Opposition	1874	1st term	
William Fisher Luxton	Rockwood	Opposition	1874	1st term	
John Gunn	St. Andrews North	Independent	1874	1st term	
John Norquay	St. Andrews South	Government	1870	2nd term	
Marc-Amable Girard	St. Boniface	Government	1870	2nd term	
Alexander Murray	St. Charles	Independent	1874	1st term	
Thomas Howard	St. Clements	Independent	1870	2nd term	
Maxime Lépine	St. Francois Xavier East	Government	1874	1st term	
Joseph Royal	St. Francois Xavier West	Government	1870	2nd term	
Edwin Bourke	St. James	Government	1870	2nd term	
Joseph Dubuc	St. Norbert	Government	1870	2nd term	
Curtis Bird	St. Pauls	Independent	1870	2nd term	
Alexander Black (1876)	St. Pauls	Government	1876	1st term	
Joseph Lemay	St. Vital	Government	1870	2nd term	
Alphonse-Fortunat Martin	Ste. Agathe	Opposition	1874	1st term	
Charles Nolin	Ste. Anne	Government	1874	1st term	
William Dick	Springfield	Independent	1874	1st term	
Corydon Partlow Brown	Westbourne	Independent	1874	1st term	
Robert Atkinson Davis	Winnipeg	Government	1874	2nd term	

== By-elections ==
By-elections were held to replace members for various reasons:

Electoral district	Member elected	Affiliation	Election date	Reason
Kildonan	John Sutherland	Opposition	April 1875	New Writ issued due to a tie.
St. Pauls	Alexander Black	Government	November 25, 1876	CJ Bird died on June 13, 1876
Lake Manitoba	James McKay	Opposition	January 17, 1877	A McKay resigned in December 1876
