= Chenier (disambiguation) =

A chenier is a former beach that, through the activities of nature, have become isolated from the sea by strips of marshes. Chenier may also mean:

- André Chénier (1762–1794), French poet
- C. J. Chenier (born 1957), American musician
- Clifton Chenier (1925–1987), American musician
- Felix Chenier (1843–1910), Canadian lawyer and political figure
- George Chenier (1907–1970), Canadian snooker player
- Jean-Olivier Chénier (1806–1837), Lower Canada soldier
- Joseph Chénier (1764-1811), French writer and brother of André
- Phil Chenier (born 1950), American basketball player
- Pierre Chenier, Canadian politician
- Ray Chénier (born 1935), Canadian politician
- René Chénier, Canadian film producer

== See also ==
- Cheniers, a commune in the Marne department in north-eastern France
- Chéniers, a commune in the Creuse department in central France
- Andrea Chénier, an opera by Umberto Giordano
- Chenier Cell, a terrorist cell of the Front de libération du Québec
