= 3rd Manitoba Legislature =

The members of the 3rd Manitoba Legislature were elected in the Manitoba general election held in December 1878. The legislature sat from February 1, 1879, to November 26, 1879.

Premier John Norquay with the support of Joseph Royal was able to form a majority government. However, Royal demanded that the government must have the support of a majority among both French-speaking and English-speaking representatives in the assembly. Royal, in partnership with Thomas Scott, attempted to take control of the government. Norquay countered by aligning himself with the English-speaking members of the assembly excluding Scott. A new election was held later in the year.

John Wright Sifton served as speaker for the assembly.

There was one session of the 3rd Legislature:

Session	Start	End
1st	February 1, 1879	June 25, 1879

Joseph-Édouard Cauchon was Lieutenant Governor of Manitoba.

== Members of the Assembly ==
The following members were elected to the assembly in 1878:

Member	Electoral district	Affiliation	First elected / previously elected	No.# of term(s)
Andrew Bourke	Baie St. Paul	Government	1878	1st term
Kenneth McKenzie	Burnside	Government	1874	2nd term
John Taylor	Headingly	Government	1870, 1874	3rd term*
John Drummond	High Bluff	Opposition	1878	1st term
Alexander Sutherland	Kildonan	Opposition	1878	1st term
John Stevenson	Pembina	Opposition	1878	1st term
James Cowan	Portage la Prairie	Independent	1874	2nd term
Thomas Lusted	Rockwood	Opposition	1878	1st term
John Gunn	St. Andrews North	Government	1878	1st term
John Norquay	St. Andrews South	Government	1870	3rd term
Alphonse Larivière	St. Boniface	Government	1878	1st term
Alexander Murray	St. Charles	Government	1874	2nd term
John Wright Sifton	St. Clements	Government	1878	1st term
Louis Schmidt	St. Francois Xavier East	Government	1870, 1878	2nd term*
Joseph Royal	St. Francois Xavier West	Government	1870	3rd term
David Marr Walker	St. James	Government	1878	1st term
Pierre Delorme	St. Norbert	Government	1870, 1878	2nd term*
Samuel Clarke Biggs	St. Pauls	Independent	1878	1st term
Maxime Goulet	St. Vital	Government	1878	1st term
Joseph Taillefer	Ste. Agathe	Government	1878	1st term
Charles Nolin	Ste. Anne	Government	1874	2nd term
Arthur Wellington Ross	Springfield	Opposition	1878	1st term
Corydon Partlow Brown	Westbourne	Government	1874	2nd term
Thomas Scott	Winnipeg	Opposition	1878	1st term

== By-elections ==
No by-elections were held to replace members.
