= Progressive Party of Manitoba (1981–1995) candidates in the 1988 Manitoba provincial election =

The Progressive Party fielded six candidates in the 1988 provincial election, none of whom were elected.

Candidate	Electoral district	Votes received	Percentage	Ranking
Charles Henry	Concordia	61	0.62	Sixth against New Democratic Party leader Gary Doer
Gordon Pratt	Fort Rouge	75	0.73	Fourth behind Liberal Jim Carr
Sidney Green	Kildonan	445	2.83	Fourth behind Liberal Gulzar Cheema
Charles Lamont	St. James	74	0.76	Fifth behind Liberal Paul Edwards
Cyril Fogel	St. Johns	171	2.46	Fourth against New Democrat Judy Wasylycia-Leis
Derek Shettler	Wolseley	149	1.76	Fourth behind Liberal Harold Taylor

== See also ==
- 1988 Manitoba general election
