= Keith Alexander (Manitoba politician) =

Canadian politician

Member of the Legislative Assembly of Manitoba for Roblin
- In office June 16, 1958 – June 23, 1966
- Preceded by: Ray Mitchell
- Succeeded by: Wally McKenzie

Personal details
- Born: January 12, 1921; Russell, Manitoba
- Died: December 18, 1972 (aged 56); Kenville, Manitoba
- Education: University of Manitoba

Arnold Keith Alexander (June 12, 1921 – December 18, 1972) was a politician in Manitoba, Canada. He was a Progressive Conservative member of the Legislative Assembly of Manitoba from 1958 to 1966.

Born in Russell, Manitoba, Alexander was educated at the University of Manitoba. He served as a pilot in the Canadian Armed Forces from 1941 to 1954. After retiring from the armed forces, he farmed in the Tummel area of Manitoba until 1969. The following year, Alexander became a United Church minister.

Alexander was first elected to the Manitoba legislature in the 1958 election, defeating incumbent Liberal-Progressive Ray Mitchell by 198 votes in the constituency of Roblin. He was re-elected by a greater margin in the elections of 1959 and 1962, and did not run in 1966. He served as a backbench supporter of Dufferin Roblin's government thorough his time in office.

He died in Kenville, Manitoba at the age of 51.
