= Greenlay =

Greenlay is a surname. Notable people with the surname include:

- Charles Greenlay (1899–1984), Canadian politician
- Mike Greenlay (born 1968), Canadian ice hockey player
