= Hugh Armstrong (politician) =

Canadian politician (1858–1926)

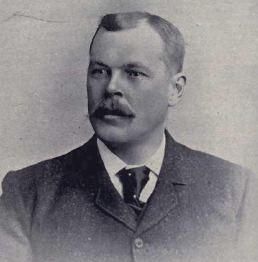

Member of the Legislative Assembly of Manitoba for Portage la Prairie
- In office 1892–1896
- In office 1902–1914
- Preceded by: William Garland

Personal details
- Born: August 5, 1858
- Died: March 4, 1926 (aged 67)

Hugh Armstrong (August 5, 1858 – March 4, 1926) was a politician in Manitoba, Canada. He served in the Legislative Assembly of Manitoba from 1892 to 1896 and from 1902 to 1915, and was a senior cabinet minister in the government of Rodmond Roblin. Armstrong was a member of the Conservative Party.

== Early life ==
Armstrong was born in New York City, New York, in 1858, and moved to Ontario with his parents one year later. He moved to Manitoba in 1883, and settled in Portage la Prairie in 1896. He worked as a fish exporter, and was a prominent figure in Manitoba's early fish industry.

== Political career ==
He was first elected to the Manitoba legislature in the provincial election of 1892, winning without opposition in the Woodlands constituency. The Manitoba Liberal Party won a majority government in this election, and Armstrong sat with the small opposition group.

He resigned from the legislature in 1896 to run for the House of Commons of Canada as a candidate of the federal Conservative Party. He lost the riding of Selkirk to Liberal Party candidate John Alexander MacDonell by a single vote.

The Manitoba Conservative Party formed government in 1900, initially under Hugh John Macdonald and subsequently under Rodmond Roblin. Armstrong returned to the legislature in 1902, and the sitting member for Portage la Prairie died. He was again returned without opposition, and sat as a government backbencher.

Armstrong was re-elected in the 1903 election, defeating Liberal candidate Edward Brown by thirty-three votes. Brown became leader of the provincial Liberal Party in 1907, and again challenged Armstrong in that year's general election. Armstrong was again victorious, defeating Brown by 223 votes.

Armstrong entered Roblin's cabinet on November 19, 1908, in the senior portfolio of Provincial Treasurer. He served in this capacity for the remainder of his career in politics. In the 1910 election, he defeated Liberal challenger Ewan McPherson by 201 votes.

MacPherson challenged Armstrong again in the 1914 provincial election, and this time defeated him by ten votes. The Conservatives again won a majority government, and Armstrong returned to the legislature after winning a deferred election in the northern constituency of Grand Rapids.

In 1915, the Roblin ministry was forced to resign from office after a report commissioned by the Lieutenant Governor found the government guilty of corruption in the tendering of contracts for new legislative buildings. Armstrong resigned from office on May 12, 1915, and did not seek re-election in the 1915 campaign.
