= Michael Kawchuk =

Canadian politician (1931–2021)

Mayor of Gilbert Plains
- In office 1969–1973

Member of the Legislative Assembly of Manitoba for Ethelbert–Plains
- In office 1966–1969

Personal details
- Born: April 23, 1931 Keld, Manitoba
- Died: January 24, 2021 (aged 89) Brandon, Manitoba
- Party: New Democratic
- Education: Brandon Agricultural College; University of Manitoba

Michael Kawchuk (April 23, 1931 – January 24, 2021) was a Canadian politician in Manitoba. He was a member of the Legislative Assembly of Manitoba from 1966 to 1969, sitting as a member of the New Democratic Party.

The first son of Nicholas Kawchuk and Annie Baran, Kawchuk was educated at the Brandon Agricultural College and the University of Manitoba. He worked as a farmer, and became a director on the Pool Elevator Board and the Manitoba Farmer's Union. He also served as Secretary–Treasurer of his local school district. In 1957, he married Nettie Frykas; they had four children together.

Kawchuk was elected to the Manitoba legislature in the provincial election of 1966, defeating Liberal William Paziuk by 64 votes in the rural riding of Ethelbert Plains. He supported Edward Schreyer's bid to become party leader in 1968–69.

Kawchuk lost to fellow incumbent Progressive Conservative Wally McKenzie by 171 votes in the 1969 election, in the redistributed riding of Roblin, which McKenzie had represented. After losing his provincial seat, Kawchuk was elected as mayor of Gilbert Plains, Manitoba, serving one term from 1969 to 1973.

Kawchuk died in Brandon, Manitoba on January 24, 2021, at the age of 89.
