= Portage la Prairie (provincial electoral district) =

Provincial electoral district in Manitoba, Canada

Coordinates: 50.071°N 98.316°W

Manitoba electoral district

Provincial electoral district
- Legislature: Legislative Assembly of Manitoba
MLA
Jeff Bereza
Progressive Conservative
- District created: 1870
- First contested: 1870
- Last contested: 2023

Demographics
- Population (2016): 21,755
- Electors (2019): 14,279
- Area (km²): 2,119
- Pop. density (per km²): 10.3

Portage la Prairie (French: Portage-la-Prairie) is a provincial electoral district of Manitoba, Canada. It has existed since the province's creation in 1870.

Portage la Prairie is located in southern Manitoba. It is bordered to the north by Lake Manitoba, to the south by Carman, to the west by Turtle Mountain, and to the east by Lakeside and Morris.

Portage la Prairie itself is in the central part of the riding. Other communities in the riding include Oakville, Newton, St. Marks, and Dakota Plains Wahpeton First Nation.

The riding's population in 1996 was 18,785. In 1999, the average family income was $45,302, and the unemployment rate was 7%. The health and service sector accounts for 18% of the riding's industry, followed by agriculture at 13%.

Thirteen per cent of Portage la Prairie's residents are aboriginal, while a further 6% are German.

Portage la Prairie has been held since by the Progressive Conservative Party for most of its history, although the New Democratic Party has increased its standing in the riding in recent years.

== Members of the Legislative Assembly ==
| Assembly | Years | Member | Party |
|---|---|---|---|
Riding created
| 1st | 1870–1874 | Frederick Bird | Opposition |
| 2nd | 1874–1878 | Kenneth McKenzie | Opposition |
| 2nd | 1875–1878 | Kenneth McKenzie | Government |
| 3rd | 1878–1879 | James Cowan | Government |
| 4th | 1880–1882 | James Cowan | Government |
| 5th | 1882–1886 | Joseph Martin | Liberal |
| 6th | 1886–1888 | Joseph Martin | Liberal |
| 7th | 1888–1892 | Joseph Martin | Liberal |
| 8th | 1892–1895 | Robert Watson | Liberal |
| 9th | 1895–1899 | Robert Watson | Liberal |
| 10th | 1899–1903 | William Garland | Conservative |
| 11th | 1903–1907 | Hugh Armstrong | Conservative |
| 12th | 1907–1910 | Hugh Armstrong | Conservative |
| 13th | 1910–1914 | Hugh Armstrong | Conservative |
| 14th | 1914–1915 | Ewan McPherson | Liberal |
| 15th | 1915–1920 | Ewan McPherson | Liberal |
| 16th | 1920–1922 | Fawcett Taylor | Conservative Party |
| 17th | 1922–1927 | Fawcett Taylor | Conservative Party |
| 18th | 1927–1932 | Fawcett Taylor | Conservative Party |
| 19th | 1932–1936 | Toby Sexsmith | Conservative Party |
| 20th | 1936–1941 | Toby Sexsmith | Conservative Party |
| 21st | 1941–1943 | Toby Sexsmith | Conservative Party |
| 21st | 1943–1945 | Charles Greenlay | Conservative |
| 22nd | 1945–1949 | Charles Greenlay | Progressive Conservative |
| 23rd | 1949–1953 | Charles Greenlay | Liberal–Progressive |
| 24th | 1953–1958 | Charles Greenlay | Liberal–Progressive |
| 25th | 1958–1959 | Charles Greenlay | Liberal–Progressive |
| 26th | 1959–1962 | John Christianson | Progressive Conservative |
| 27th | 1962–1966 | Gordon Johnston | Liberal |
| 28th | 1966–1969 | Gordon Johnston | Liberal |
| 29th | 1969–1972 | Gordon Johnston | Liberal |
| 30th | 1973–1977 | Gordon Johnston | Liberal |
| 31st | 1977–1981 | Lloyd Hyde | Progressive Conservative |
| 32nd | 1981–1985 | Lloyd Hyde | Progressive Conservative |
| 33rd | 1985–1988 | Ed Connery | Progressive Conservative |
| 34th | 1988–1990 | Ed Connery | Progressive Conservative |
| 35th | 1990–1992 | Ed Connery | Progressive Conservative |
| 35th | 1992–1995 | Brian Pallister | Progressive Conservative |
| 36th | 1995–1997 | Brian Pallister | Progressive Conservative |
| 36th | 1997–1999 | David Faurschou | Progressive Conservative |
| 37th | 1999–2003 | David Faurschou | Progressive Conservative |
| 38th | 2003–2007 | David Faurschou | Progressive Conservative |
| 39th | 2007–2011 | David Faurschou | Progressive Conservative |
| 40th | 2011–2016 | Ian Wishart | Progressive Conservative |
| 41st | 2016–2019 | Ian Wishart | Progressive Conservative |
| 42nd | 2019–2023 | Ian Wishart | Progressive Conservative |
| 43rd | 2023–present | Jeff Bereza | Progressive Conservative |

== Election results ==
=== 2023 ===
2023 Manitoba general election
| Party | Candidate | Votes | % | ±% | Expenditures |
|---|---|---|---|---|---|
| Progressive Conservative | Jeff Bereza | 3,816 | 59.61 | -6.07 | $13,665.32 |
| New Democratic | Acacia Weselake | 1,918 | 29.96 | +7.96 | $168.00 |
| Green | Arishya Aggarwal | 367 | 5.73 | – | $1,117.39 |
| Liberal | Ralph Dooley | 301 | 4.70 | -7.63 | $0.00 |
| Total valid votes/expense limit | | 6,402 | 99.13 | – | $54,279.00 |
| Total rejected and declined ballots | | 56 | 0.87 | – | |
| Turnout | | 6,458 | 46.77 | -1.87 | |
| Eligible voters | | 13,809 | | | |
| Progressive Conservative hold | | Swing | | -7.01 | |
Source(s) Source: Elections Manitoba

=== 2019 ===
2019 Manitoba general election
| Party | Candidate | Votes | % | ±% | Expenditures |
|---|---|---|---|---|---|
| Progressive Conservative | Ian Wishart | 4,502 | 65.67 | -4.87 | $12,039.73 |
| New Democratic | Andrew Podolecki | 1,508 | 22.00 | +11.39 | $681.34 |
| Liberal | Charles Huband | 845 | 12.33 | -6.52 | $4,239.60 |
| Total | | 6,855 | 98.70 | – | |
| Rejected | | 90 | 1.30 | -0.47 | |
| Turnout | | 6,945 | 48.64 | -2.69 | |
| Eligible voters | | 14,279 | | | |
| Progressive Conservative hold | | Swing | | -8.13 | |
Source(s) Source: Manitoba. Chief Electoral Officer (2019). Statement of Votes for the 42nd Provincial General Election, September 10, 2019 (PDF) (Report). Winnipeg: Elections Manitoba.

=== 2016 ===
2016 Manitoba general election
| Party | Candidate | Votes | % | ±% |
|---|---|---|---|---|
| Progressive Conservative | Ian Wishart | 4,635 | 70.55% | 18.31% |
| Liberal | Stephen J. Prince | 1,238 | 18.84% | 10.40% |
| New Democratic | Alex MacDonald | 697 | 10.61% | -28.71% |
| Total | | 6,570 | – | – |
| Rejected | | 44 | 0.66 | |
| Eligible voters / turnout | | 13,029 | 50.43% | -0.32% |
Source(s) Source: Manitoba. Chief Electoral Officer (2016). Statement of Votes for the 41st Provincial General Election, April 19, 2016 (PDF) (Report). Winnipeg: Elections Manitoba.

=== 2011 ===
2011 Manitoba general election
| Party | Candidate | Votes | % | ±% | Expenditures |
|---|---|---|---|---|---|
| Progressive Conservative | Ian Wishart | 3,566 | 52.24 | 3.93% | $17,302.23 |
| New Democratic | James Kostuchuk | 2,689 | 39.39 | -3.08% | $6,997.42 |
| Liberal | Michelle Cudmore-Armstrong | 571 | 8.37 | -0.85% | $5,176.36 |
| Total | | 6,861 | – | – | |
| Rejected | | 30 | – | | |
| Eligible voters / turnout | | 13,521 | 50.74% | -6.25% | |
Source: Elections Manitoba

=== 2007 ===
2007 Manitoba general election
| Party | Candidate | Votes | % | ±% | Expenditures |
|---|---|---|---|---|---|
| Progressive Conservative | David Faurschou | 3,344 | 48.16 | -1.51% | $27,243.58 |
| New Democratic | James Kostuchuk | 2,935 | 42.23 | -0.33% | $25,460.29 |
| Liberal | Marvin Krawec | 643 | 9.25 | 1.84% | $21,600.10 |
| Total valid votes | | 6,922 | 99.60 | | |
| Rejected and declined ballots | | 28 | | | |
| Turnout | | 6,950 | 57.10 | | |
| Electors on the lists | | 12,172 | | | |
Source(s) Source: Manitoba. Chief Electoral Officer (2019). Statement of Votes for the 42nd Provincial General Election, September 10, 2019 (PDF) (Report). Winnipeg: Elections Manitoba.

=== 2003 ===
2003 Manitoba general election
| Party | Candidate | Votes | % | ±% |
|---|---|---|---|---|
| Progressive Conservative | David Faurschou | 3,524 | 49.82% | 3.30% |
| New Democratic | Bob Kriski | 3,023 | 42.73% | 5.68% |
| Liberal | Mike Lefebvre | 527 | 7.45% | -7.49% |
| Total | | 7,074 | – | – |
| Rejected | | 23 | – | |
| Eligible voters / turnout | | 12,441 | 56.86% | -2.59% |
Source(s) Source: Manitoba. Chief Electoral Officer (2003). Statement of Votes for the 38th Provincial General Election, June 3, 2003 (PDF) (Report). Winnipeg: Elections Manitoba.

=== 1999 ===
1999 Manitoba general election
| Party | Candidate | Votes | % | ±% | Expenditures |
|---|---|---|---|---|---|
| Progressive Conservative | David Faurschou | 3,476 | 46.52% | 9.22% | $24,894.04 |
| New Democratic | Connie Gretsinger | 2,769 | 37.06% | 16.42% | $5,468.00 |
| Liberal | Dave Cook | 1,116 | 14.94% | -10.58% | $21,481.96 |
| Libertarian | Gary Bergen | 111 | 1.49% | – | $347.69 |
| Total valid votes | | 7,472 | 100.00 | | |
| Rejected and declined ballots | | 39 | | | |
| Turnout | | 7,511 | 59.76 | | |
| Electors on the lists | | 12,569 | | | |
Source(s) Source: Manitoba. Chief Electoral Officer (1999). Statement of Votes for the 37th Provincial General Election, September 21, 1999 (PDF) (Report). Winnipeg: Elections Manitoba.

=== 1997 by-election ===
Manitoba provincial by-election, September 30, 1997 Resignation of Brian Pallister
| Party | Candidate | Votes | % | ±% |
|---|---|---|---|---|
| Progressive Conservative | David Faurschou | 2,422 | 37.30% | -14.06% |
| Liberal | Dave Quinn | 1,657 | 25.52% | -1.82% |
| New Democratic | Connie Gretsinger | 1,340 | 20.64% | 1.02% |
| Independent | Warren Goodwin | 1,025 | 15.79% | – |
| Independent | Ralph L. Jackson | 49 | 0.75% | -0.93% |
| Total | | 6,493 | – | – |
| Rejected | | N/A | – | |
| Eligible voters / turnout | | N/A | – | |
Source(s) Source: Manitoba. Chief Electoral Officer (1999). Statement of Votes for the 37th Provincial General Election, September 21, 1999 (PDF) (Report). Winnipeg: Elections Manitoba. pp. 211–277.

=== 1995 ===
1995 Manitoba general election
| Party | Candidate | Votes | % | ±% |
|---|---|---|---|---|
| Progressive Conservative | Brian Pallister | 3,977 | 51.36% | -0.33% |
| Liberal | Bob Turner | 2,117 | 27.34% | -4.48% |
| New Democratic | Connie Gretsinger | 1,519 | 19.62% | 9.07% |
| Independent | Ralph Jackson | 130 | 1.68% | – |
| Total | | 7,743 | – | – |
| Rejected | | 21 | – | |
| Eligible voters / turnout | | 11,792 | 65.66% | |
Source(s) Source: Manitoba. Chief Electoral Officer (1999). Statement of Votes for the 37th Provincial General Election, September 21, 1999 (PDF) (Report). Winnipeg: Elections Manitoba. pp. 211–277.

=== 1992 by-election ===
Manitoba provincial by-election, September 15, 1992 Resignation of Edward Connery
| Party | Candidate | Votes | % | ±% |
|---|---|---|---|---|
| Progressive Conservative | Brian Pallister | 3,215 | 51.70% | -2.16% |
| Liberal | Helen Christoffersen | 1,979 | 31.82% | 2.49% |
| New Democratic | Ralph Jackson | 656 | 10.55% | -3.20% |
| Reform | Fred Debrecen | 369 | 5.93% | – |
| Total | | 6,219 | – | – |
| Rejected | | N/A | – | |
| Eligible voters / turnout | | N/A | – | |
Source(s) Source: Manitoba. Chief Electoral Officer (1999). Statement of Votes for the 37th Provincial General Election, September 21, 1999 (PDF) (Report). Winnipeg: Elections Manitoba. pp. 211–277.

=== 1990 ===
1990 Manitoba general election
| Party | Candidate | Votes | % | ±% |
|---|---|---|---|---|
| Progressive Conservative | Edward Connery | 4,276 | 53.85% | 4.57% |
| Liberal | Darlene Hamm | 2,329 | 29.33% | -5.14% |
| New Democratic | Arden Campbell | 1,092 | 13.75% | 4.90% |
| Confederation of Regions | Roy Lyall | 243 | 3.06% | -4.33% |
| Total | | 7,940 | – | – |
| Rejected | | 20 | – | |
| Eligible voters / turnout | | 12,094 | 65.65% | |
Source(s) Source: Manitoba. Chief Electoral Officer (1999). Statement of Votes for the 37th Provincial General Election, September 21, 1999 (PDF) (Report). Winnipeg: Elections Manitoba. pp. 211–277.

=== 1988 ===
1988 Manitoba general election
| Party | Candidate | Votes | % | ±% |
|---|---|---|---|---|
| Progressive Conservative | Edward Connery | 4,020 | 49.28% | -2.07% |
| Liberal | Darlene Hamm | 2,812 | 34.47% | 21.01% |
| New Democratic | Bill Zettler | 722 | 8.85% | -11.41% |
| Confederation of Regions | Irene Armishaw | 603 | 7.39% | -7.54% |
| Total | | 8,157 | – | – |
| Rejected | | 20 | – | |
| Eligible voters / turnout | | 11,404 | 71.53% | |
Source(s) Source: Manitoba. Chief Electoral Officer (1999). Statement of Votes for the 37th Provincial General Election, September 21, 1999 (PDF) (Report). Winnipeg: Elections Manitoba. pp. 211–277.

=== 1986 ===
1986 Manitoba general election
| Party | Candidate | Votes | % | ±% |
|---|---|---|---|---|
| Progressive Conservative | Edward Connery | 3,693 | 51.35% | 3.93% |
| New Democratic | Bill Zettler | 1,457 | 20.26% | -11.35% |
| Confederation of Regions | Georgina Cuthbert | 1,074 | 14.93% | – |
| Liberal | Hugh O'Neil Kennedy | 968 | 13.46% | -7.51% |
| Total | | 7,192 | – | – |
| Rejected | | 21 | – | |
| Eligible voters / turnout | | 11,092 | 64.84% | |
Source(s) Source: Manitoba. Chief Electoral Officer (1999). Statement of Votes for the 37th Provincial General Election, September 21, 1999 (PDF) (Report). Winnipeg: Elections Manitoba. pp. 211–277.

=== 1981 ===
1981 Manitoba general election
| Party | Candidate | Votes | % | ±% |
|---|---|---|---|---|
| Progressive Conservative | Lloyd Hyde | 3,620 | 47.42% | 0.14% |
| New Democratic | Audrey Tufford | 2,413 | 31.61% | 4.09% |
| Liberal | Hugh Moran | 1,601 | 20.97% | -4.23% |
| Total | | 7,634 | – | – |
| Rejected | | 40 | – | |
| Eligible voters / turnout | | 10,684 | 71.45% | |
Source(s) Source: Manitoba. Chief Electoral Officer (1999). Statement of Votes for the 37th Provincial General Election, September 21, 1999 (PDF) (Report). Winnipeg: Elections Manitoba. pp. 211–277.

=== 1977 ===
1977 Manitoba general election
| Party | Candidate | Votes | % | ±% |
|---|---|---|---|---|
| Progressive Conservative | Lloyd Hyde | 3,552 | 47.28% | 11.05% |
| New Democratic | Peter Swidnicki | 2,067 | 27.52% | 0.49% |
| Liberal | Hugh Moran | 1,893 | 25.20% | -11.54% |
| Total | | 7,512 | – | – |
| Rejected | | 25 | – | |
| Eligible voters / turnout | | 9,665 | 77.72% | |
Source(s) Source: Manitoba. Chief Electoral Officer (1999). Statement of Votes for the 37th Provincial General Election, September 21, 1999 (PDF) (Report). Winnipeg: Elections Manitoba. pp. 211–277.

=== 1973 ===
1973 Manitoba general election
| Party | Candidate | Votes | % | ±% |
|---|---|---|---|---|
| Liberal | Gordon Johnston | 2,628 | 36.74% | -4.52% |
| Progressive Conservative | George Fairfield | 2,592 | 36.24% | -4.84% |
| New Democratic | Albert Barrett | 1,933 | 27.02% | 9.36% |
| Total | | 7,153 | – | – |
| Rejected | | 46 | – | |
| Eligible voters / turnout | | 9,043 | 79.10% | |
Source(s) Source: Manitoba. Chief Electoral Officer (1999). Statement of Votes for the 37th Provincial General Election, September 21, 1999 (PDF) (Report). Winnipeg: Elections Manitoba. pp. 211–277.

=== 1969 ===
1969 Manitoba general election
| Party | Candidate | Votes | % | ±% |
|---|---|---|---|---|
| Liberal | Gordon Johnston | 2,451 | 41.26% | -12.94% |
| Progressive Conservative | Harvey Carmichael | 2,440 | 41.08% | 1.49% |
| New Democratic | Sidney Coulthard | 1,049 | 17.66% | 11.46% |
| Total | | 5,940 | – | – |
| Rejected | | 19 | – | |
| Eligible voters / turnout | | 8,145 | 72.93% | |
Source(s) Source: Manitoba. Chief Electoral Officer (1999). Statement of Votes for the 37th Provincial General Election, September 21, 1999 (PDF) (Report). Winnipeg: Elections Manitoba. pp. 211–277.

=== 1966 ===
1966 Manitoba general election
| Party | Candidate | Votes | % | ±% |
|---|---|---|---|---|
| Liberal | Gordon Johnston | 2,726 | 54.21% | 3.47% |
| Progressive Conservative | John Christianson | 1,991 | 39.59% | -5.05% |
| New Democratic | Sybil A. Barnett | 312 | 6.20% | 1.58% |
| Total | | 5,029 | – | – |
| Rejected | | 30 | – | |
| Eligible voters / turnout | | 6,708 | 74.97% | |
Source(s) Source: Manitoba. Chief Electoral Officer (1999). Statement of Votes for the 37th Provincial General Election, September 21, 1999 (PDF) (Report). Winnipeg: Elections Manitoba. pp. 211–277.

=== 1962 ===
1962 Manitoba general election
| Party | Candidate | Votes | % | ±% |
|---|---|---|---|---|
| Liberal | Gordon Johnston | 2,414 | 50.74% | 10.52% |
| Progressive Conservative | John Christianson | 2,124 | 44.64% | -5.99% |
| New Democratic | Francis Harry Mason | 220 | 4.62% | -4.54% |
| Total | | 4,758 | – | – |
| Rejected | | 71 | – | |
| Eligible voters / turnout | | 6,537 | 72.79% | |
Source(s) Source: Manitoba. Chief Electoral Officer (1999). Statement of Votes for the 37th Provincial General Election, September 21, 1999 (PDF) (Report). Winnipeg: Elections Manitoba. pp. 211–277.

=== 1959 ===
1959 Manitoba general election
| Party | Candidate | Votes | % | ±% |
|---|---|---|---|---|
| Progressive Conservative | John Christianson | 2,300 | 50.63% | 12.87% |
| Liberal–Progressive | Charles Greenlay | 1,827 | 40.22% | -8.66% |
| Co-operative Commonwealth | Fred Allan Tufford | 416 | 9.16% | -4.21% |
| Total | | 4,543 | – | – |
| Rejected | | 21 | – | |
| Eligible voters / turnout | | 6,319 | 71.89% | |
Source(s) Source: Manitoba. Chief Electoral Officer (1999). Statement of Votes for the 37th Provincial General Election, September 21, 1999 (PDF) (Report). Winnipeg: Elections Manitoba. pp. 211–277.

=== 1958 ===
1958 Manitoba general election
| Party | Candidate | Votes | % | ±% |
|---|---|---|---|---|
| Liberal–Progressive | Charles Greenlay | 1,978 | 48.88% | 5.85% |
| Progressive Conservative | Robert Ernest Burke | 1,528 | 37.76% | 0.10% |
| Co-operative Commonwealth | Albert R. Barrett | 541 | 13.37% | – |
| Total | | 4,047 | – | – |
| Rejected | | 27 | – | |
| Eligible voters / turnout | | 6,337 | 63.86% | |
Source(s) Source: Manitoba. Chief Electoral Officer (1999). Statement of Votes for the 37th Provincial General Election, September 21, 1999 (PDF) (Report). Winnipeg: Elections Manitoba. pp. 211–277.

=== 1953 ===
1953 Manitoba general election
| Party | Candidate | Votes | % | ±% |
|---|---|---|---|---|
| Liberal–Progressive | Charles Greenlay | 1,747 | 43.03% | – |
| Progressive Conservative | William Charles "Bill" Warren | 1,529 | 37.66% | – |
| Social Credit | Bernard H. Rempel | 784 | 19.31% | – |
| Total | | 4,060 | – | – |
| Rejected | | 121 | – | |
| Eligible voters / turnout | | 5,255 | 77.26% | |
Source(s) Source: Manitoba. Chief Electoral Officer (1999). Statement of Votes for the 37th Provincial General Election, September 21, 1999 (PDF) (Report). Winnipeg: Elections Manitoba. pp. 211–277.

=== 1949 ===
1949 Manitoba general election
| Party | Candidate | Votes | % | ±% |
|---|---|---|---|---|
| Progressive Conservative | Charles Greenlay | Acclaimed | – | – |
| Total | | | – | – |
| Rejected | | N/A | – | |
| Eligible voters / turnout | | 4,458 | | |
Source(s) Source: Manitoba. Chief Electoral Officer (1999). Statement of Votes for the 37th Provincial General Election, September 21, 1999 (PDF) (Report). Winnipeg: Elections Manitoba. pp. 211–277.

=== 1945 ===
1945 Manitoba general election
| Party | Candidate | Votes | % | ±% |
|---|---|---|---|---|
| Progressive Conservative | Charles Greenlay | 1,878 | 68.82% | 6.32% |
| Co-operative Commonwealth | Margaret Mann | 746 | 27.34% | 5.31% |
| Labor–Progressive | Earl Moffat | 105 | 3.85% | -11.62% |
| Total | | 2,729 | – | – |
| Rejected | | 26 | – | |
| Eligible voters / turnout | | 4,069 | 67.07% | |
Source(s) Source: Manitoba. Chief Electoral Officer (1999). Statement of Votes for the 37th Provincial General Election, September 21, 1999 (PDF) (Report). Winnipeg: Elections Manitoba. pp. 211–277.

=== 1943 by-election ===
Manitoba provincial by-election, 1943
| Party | Candidate | Votes | % | ±% |
|---|---|---|---|---|
| Conservative | Charles Greenlay | 1,762 | 62.50% | – |
| Co-operative Commonwealth | Horace Ashley Ireland | 621 | 22.03% | – |
| Labor–Progressive | F. Bernard Muller | 436 | 15.47% | – |
| Total | | 2,819 | – | – |
| Rejected | | N/A | – | |
| Eligible voters / turnout | | N/A | – | |
Source(s) Source: Manitoba. Chief Electoral Officer (1999). Statement of Votes for the 37th Provincial General Election, September 21, 1999 (PDF) (Report). Winnipeg: Elections Manitoba. pp. 211–277.

=== 1941 ===
1941 Manitoba general election
| Party | Candidate | Votes | % | ±% |
|---|---|---|---|---|
| Conservative | Toby Sexsmith | Acclaimed | – | – |
| Total | | | – | – |
| Rejected | | N/A | – | |
| Eligible voters / turnout | | 3,728 | | |
Source(s) Source: Manitoba. Chief Electoral Officer (1999). Statement of Votes for the 37th Provincial General Election, September 21, 1999 (PDF) (Report). Winnipeg: Elections Manitoba. pp. 211–277.

=== 1936 ===
1936 Manitoba general election
| Party | Candidate | Votes | % | ±% |
|---|---|---|---|---|
| Conservative | Toby Sexsmith | 1,727 | 57.45% | 13.70% |
| Liberal–Progressive | Edward Albert Gilroy | 1,279 | 42.55% | – |
| Total | | 3,006 | – | – |
| Rejected | | 51 | – | |
| Eligible voters / turnout | | 3,787 | 79.38% | |
Source(s) Source: Manitoba. Chief Electoral Officer (1999). Statement of Votes for the 37th Provincial General Election, September 21, 1999 (PDF) (Report). Winnipeg: Elections Manitoba. pp. 211–277.

=== 1933 by-election ===
Manitoba provincial by-election, 1933
| Party | Candidate | Votes | % | ±% |
|---|---|---|---|---|
| Conservative | Toby Sexsmith | 1,261 | 43.75% | -21.98% |
| Independent | Edward Albert Gilroy | 1,024 | 35.53% | – |
| Labour | Horace Ashley Ireland | 597 | 20.71% | – |
| Total | | 2,882 | – | – |
| Rejected | | N/A | – | |
| Eligible voters / turnout | | N/A | – | |
Source(s) Source: Manitoba. Chief Electoral Officer (1999). Statement of Votes for the 37th Provincial General Election, September 21, 1999 (PDF) (Report). Winnipeg: Elections Manitoba. pp. 211–277.

=== 1932 ===
1932 Manitoba general election
| Party | Candidate | Votes | % | ±% |
|---|---|---|---|---|
| Conservative | Fawcett Taylor | 2,016 | 65.73% | -0.79% |
| Liberal–Progressive | Ewan McPherson | 1,051 | 34.27% | 0.79% |
| Total | | 3,067 | – | – |
| Rejected | | N/A | – | |
| Eligible voters / turnout | | 3,453 | 88.82% | |
Source(s) Source: Manitoba. Chief Electoral Officer (1999). Statement of Votes for the 37th Provincial General Election, September 21, 1999 (PDF) (Report). Winnipeg: Elections Manitoba. pp. 211–277.

=== 1927 ===
1927 Manitoba general election
| Party | Candidate | Votes | % | ±% |
|---|---|---|---|---|
| Conservative | Fawcett Taylor | 1,580 | 66.53% | 14.17% |
| Liberal | Sydney McKay | 795 | 33.47% | -14.17% |
| Total | | 2,375 | – | – |
| Rejected | | N/A | – | |
| Eligible voters / turnout | | 2,698 | 88.03% | |
Source(s) Source: Manitoba. Chief Electoral Officer (1999). Statement of Votes for the 37th Provincial General Election, September 21, 1999 (PDF) (Report). Winnipeg: Elections Manitoba. pp. 211–277.

=== 1922 ===
1922 Manitoba general election
| Party | Candidate | Votes | % | ±% |
|---|---|---|---|---|
| Conservative | Fawcett Taylor | 1,436 | 52.35% | -3.82% |
| Liberal | Charles Duncan McPherson | 1,307 | 47.65% | 3.82% |
| Total | | 2,743 | – | – |
| Rejected | | N/A | – | |
| Eligible voters / turnout | | 3,134 | 87.52% | |
Source(s) Source: Manitoba. Chief Electoral Officer (1999). Statement of Votes for the 37th Provincial General Election, September 21, 1999 (PDF) (Report). Winnipeg: Elections Manitoba. pp. 211–277.

=== 1920 ===
1920 Manitoba general election
| Party | Candidate | Votes | % | ±% |
|---|---|---|---|---|
| Conservative | Fawcett Taylor | 1,306 | 56.17% | 13.06% |
| Liberal | Ewan McPherson | 1,019 | 43.83% | -13.06% |
| Total | | 2,325 | – | – |
| Rejected | | N/A | – | |
| Eligible voters / turnout | | 2,605 | 89.25% | |
Source(s) Source: Manitoba. Chief Electoral Officer (1999). Statement of Votes for the 37th Provincial General Election, September 21, 1999 (PDF) (Report). Winnipeg: Elections Manitoba. pp. 211–277.

=== 1915 ===
1915 Manitoba general election
| Party | Candidate | Votes | % | ±% |
|---|---|---|---|---|
| Liberal | Ewan McPherson | 1,065 | 56.89% | 6.72% |
| Conservative | Fawcett Taylor | 807 | 43.11% | -6.72% |
| Total | | 1,872 | – | – |
| Rejected | | N/A | – | |
| Eligible voters / turnout | | 2,130 | 87.89% | |
Source(s) Source: Manitoba. Chief Electoral Officer (1999). Statement of Votes for the 37th Provincial General Election, September 21, 1999 (PDF) (Report). Winnipeg: Elections Manitoba. pp. 211–277.

=== 1914 ===
1914 Manitoba general election
| Party | Candidate | Votes | % | ±% |
|---|---|---|---|---|
| Liberal | Ewan McPherson | 1,027 | 50.17% | 6.36% |
| Conservative | Hugh Armstrong | 1,020 | 49.83% | -6.36% |
| Total | | 2,047 | – | – |
| Rejected | | N/A | – | |
| Eligible voters / turnout | | 2,222 | 92.12% | |
Source(s) Source: Manitoba. Chief Electoral Officer (1999). Statement of Votes for the 37th Provincial General Election, September 21, 1999 (PDF) (Report). Winnipeg: Elections Manitoba. pp. 211–277.

=== 1910 ===
1910 Manitoba general election
| Party | Candidate | Votes | % | ±% |
|---|---|---|---|---|
| Conservative | Hugh Armstrong | 912 | 56.19% | – |
| Liberal | Ewan McPherson | 711 | 43.81% | – |
| Total | | 1,623 | – | – |
| Rejected | | N/A | – | |
| Eligible voters / turnout | | 1,992 | 81.48% | |
Source(s) Source: Manitoba. Chief Electoral Officer (1999). Statement of Votes for the 37th Provincial General Election, September 21, 1999 (PDF) (Report). Winnipeg: Elections Manitoba. pp. 211–277.

=== 1908 by-election ===
Manitoba provincial by-election, 1908
| Party | Candidate | Votes | % | ±% |
|---|---|---|---|---|
| Conservative | Hugh Armstrong | Acclaimed | – | – |
| Total | | | – | – |
| Rejected | | N/A | – | |
| Eligible voters / turnout | | N/A | – | |
Source(s) Source: Manitoba. Chief Electoral Officer (1999). Statement of Votes for the 37th Provincial General Election, September 21, 1999 (PDF) (Report). Winnipeg: Elections Manitoba. pp. 211–277.

=== 1907 ===
1907 Manitoba general election
| Party | Candidate | Votes | % | ±% |
|---|---|---|---|---|
| Conservative | Hugh Armstrong | 868 | 57.37% | 6.30% |
| Liberal | Edward Brown | 645 | 42.63% | -6.30% |
| Total | | 1,513 | – | – |
| Rejected | | N/A | – | |
| Eligible voters / turnout | | 1,818 | 83.22% | |
Source(s) Source: Manitoba. Chief Electoral Officer (1999). Statement of Votes for the 37th Provincial General Election, September 21, 1999 (PDF) (Report). Winnipeg: Elections Manitoba. pp. 211–277.

=== 1903 ===
1903 Manitoba general election
| Party | Candidate | Votes | % | ±% |
|---|---|---|---|---|
| Conservative | Hugh Armstrong | 742 | 51.07% | – |
| Liberal | Edward Brown | 711 | 48.93% | – |
| Total | | 1,453 | – | – |
| Rejected | | N/A | – | |
| Eligible voters / turnout | | 1,549 | 93.80% | |
Source(s) Source: Manitoba. Chief Electoral Officer (1999). Statement of Votes for the 37th Provincial General Election, September 21, 1999 (PDF) (Report). Winnipeg: Elections Manitoba. pp. 211–277.

=== 1902 by-election ===
Manitoba provincial by-election, February 6, 1902 Death of William Garland
| Party | Candidate | Votes | % | ±% |
|---|---|---|---|---|
| Conservative | Hugh Armstrong | Acclaimed | – | – |
| Total | | | – | – |
| Rejected | | N/A | – | |
| Eligible voters / turnout | | N/A | – | |
Source(s) Source: Manitoba. Chief Electoral Officer (1999). Statement of Votes for the 37th Provincial General Election, September 21, 1999 (PDF) (Report). Winnipeg: Elections Manitoba. pp. 211–277.

=== 1899 ===
1899 Manitoba general election
| Party | Candidate | Votes | % | ±% |
|---|---|---|---|---|
| Conservative | William Garland | 640 | 57.30% | 7.95% |
| Liberal | Robert Watson | 477 | 42.70% | -7.95% |
| Total | | 1,117 | – | – |
| Rejected | | N/A | – | |
| Eligible voters / turnout | | 1,315 | 84.94% | |
Source(s) Source: Manitoba. Chief Electoral Officer (1999). Statement of Votes for the 37th Provincial General Election, September 21, 1999 (PDF) (Report). Winnipeg: Elections Manitoba. pp. 211–277.

=== 1896 ===
1896 Manitoba general election
| Party | Candidate | Votes | % | ±% |
|---|---|---|---|---|
| Liberal | Robert Watson | 425 | 50.66% | -4.58% |
| Conservative | William James Cooper | 414 | 49.34% | 4.58% |
| Total | | 839 | – | – |
| Rejected | | N/A | – | |
| Eligible voters / turnout | | 1,027 | 81.69% | |
Source(s) Source: Manitoba. Chief Electoral Officer (1999). Statement of Votes for the 37th Provincial General Election, September 21, 1999 (PDF) (Report). Winnipeg: Elections Manitoba. pp. 211–277.

=== 1892 ===
1892 Manitoba general election
| Party | Candidate | Votes | % | ±% |
|---|---|---|---|---|
| Liberal | Robert Watson | 543 | 55.24% | – |
| Conservative | William James Cooper | 440 | 44.76% | – |
| Total | | 983 | – | – |
| Rejected | | N/A | – | |
| Eligible voters / turnout | | 1,128 | 87.15% | – |
Source(s) Source: Manitoba. Chief Electoral Officer (1999). Statement of Votes for the 37th Provincial General Election, September 21, 1999 (PDF) (Report). Winnipeg: Elections Manitoba.

=== 1891 by-election ===
Manitoba provincial by-election, 1891
| Party | Candidate | Votes | % | ±% |
|---|---|---|---|---|
| Liberal | Joseph Martin | 286 | 55.97% | – |
| Unknown | William Garland | 225 | 44.03% | – |
| Total | | 511 | – | – |
| Rejected | | N/A | – | |
| Eligible voters / turnout | | N/A | – | – |
Source(s) Source: Manitoba. Chief Electoral Officer (1999). Statement of Votes for the 37th Provincial General Election, September 21, 1999 (PDF) (Report). Winnipeg: Elections Manitoba.

=== 1888 ===
1888 Manitoba general election
| Party | Candidate | Votes | % | ±% |
|---|---|---|---|---|
| Liberal | Joseph Martin | Acclaimed | – | – |
| Total | | | – | – |
| Rejected | | N/A | – | |
| Eligible voters / turnout | | N/A | – | – |
Source(s) Source: Manitoba. Chief Electoral Officer (1999). Statement of Votes for the 37th Provincial General Election, September 21, 1999 (PDF) (Report). Winnipeg: Elections Manitoba.

=== 1888 by-election ===
Manitoba provincial by-election, 1888
| Party | Candidate | Votes | % | ±% |
|---|---|---|---|---|
| Liberal | Joseph Martin | 298 | 63.81% | – |
| Conservative | William Patterson Smith | 169 | 36.19% | – |
| Total | | 467 | – | – |
| Rejected | | N/A | – | |
| Eligible voters / turnout | | N/A | – | – |
Source(s) Source: Manitoba. Chief Electoral Officer (1999). Statement of Votes for the 37th Provincial General Election, September 21, 1999 (PDF) (Report). Winnipeg: Elections Manitoba.

=== 1886 ===
1886 Manitoba general election
| Party | Candidate | Votes | % | ±% |
|---|---|---|---|---|
| Liberal | Joseph Martin | 358 | 51.07% | -1.56% |
| Conservative | William Patterson Smith | 343 | 48.93% | 1.56% |
| Total | | 701 | – | – |
| Rejected | | N/A | – | |
| Eligible voters / turnout | | 1,845 | 37.99% | – |
Source(s) Source: Manitoba. Chief Electoral Officer (1999). Statement of Votes for the 37th Provincial General Election, September 21, 1999 (PDF) (Report). Winnipeg: Elections Manitoba.

=== 1883 by-election ===
Manitoba provincial by-election, 1883
| Party | Candidate | Votes | % | ±% |
|---|---|---|---|---|
| Liberal | Joseph Martin | 290 | 52.63% | 1.58% |
| Conservative | William Ross Black | 261 | 47.37% | -1.58% |
| Total | | 551 | – | – |
| Rejected | | N/A | – | |
| Eligible voters / turnout | | N/A | – | – |
Source(s) Source: Manitoba. Chief Electoral Officer (1999). Statement of Votes for the 37th Provincial General Election, September 21, 1999 (PDF) (Report). Winnipeg: Elections Manitoba.

=== 1883 ===
1883 Manitoba general election
| Party | Candidate | Votes | % | ±% |
|---|---|---|---|---|
| Liberal | Joseph Martin | 315 | 50.72% | – |
| Conservative | William Ross Black | 304 | 48.95% | – |
| Liberal | Edward Hay | 2 | 0.32% | – |
| Total | | 621 | – | – |
| Rejected | | N/A | – | |
| Eligible voters / turnout | | N/A | – | – |
Source(s) Source: Manitoba. Chief Electoral Officer (1999). Statement of Votes for the 37th Provincial General Election, September 21, 1999 (PDF) (Report). Winnipeg: Elections Manitoba.

=== 1879 ===
1879 Manitoba general election
| Party | Candidate | Votes | % | ±% |
|---|---|---|---|---|
| Independent Liberal | James Cowan | Acclaimed | – | – |
| Total | | | – | – |
| Rejected | | N/A | – | |
| Eligible voters / turnout | | N/A | – | – |
Source(s) Source: Manitoba. Chief Electoral Officer (1999). Statement of Votes for the 37th Provincial General Election, September 21, 1999 (PDF) (Report). Winnipeg: Elections Manitoba.

=== 1878 ===
1878 Manitoba general election
| Party | Candidate | Votes | % | ±% |
|---|---|---|---|---|
| Government | James Cowan | Acclaimed | – | – |
| Total | | | – | – |
| Rejected | | N/A | – | |
| Eligible voters / turnout | | 218 | 0.00% | |
Source(s) Source: Manitoba. Chief Electoral Officer (1999). Statement of Votes for the 37th Provincial General Election, September 21, 1999 (PDF) (Report). Winnipeg: Elections Manitoba.

=== 1874 ===
1874 Manitoba general election
| Party | Candidate | Votes | % | ±% |
|---|---|---|---|---|
| Opposition | Kenneth McKenzie | 87 | 51.79% | 3.10% |
| Undeclared | William John James | 81 | 48.21% | 44.27% |
| Total | | 168 | – | – |
| Rejected | | N/A | – | |
| Eligible voters / turnout | | 262 | 64.12% | – |
Source(s) Source: Manitoba. Chief Electoral Officer (1999). Statement of Votes for the 37th Provincial General Election, September 21, 1999 (PDF) (Report). Winnipeg: Elections Manitoba.

=== 1870 ===
1870 Manitoba general election
| Party | Candidate | Votes | % |
|---|---|---|---|
| Opposition | Frederick Bird | 37 | 48.68% |
| Government | John James Weller | 36 | 47.37% |
| Undeclared | William Garrioch | 3 | 3.95% |
| Total | | 76 | – |
| Rejected | | N/A | – |
| Eligible voters / turnout | | N/A | – |
Source(s) Source: Manitoba. Chief Electoral Officer (1999). Statement of Votes for the 37th Provincial General Election, September 21, 1999 (PDF) (Report). Winnipeg: Elections Manitoba.

== Previous boundaries ==
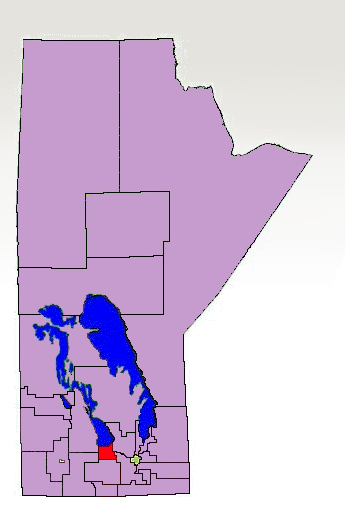
The 1998–2011 boundaries for Portage la Prairie highlighted in red

== See also ==
- List of Manitoba provincial electoral districts
- Canadian provincial electoral districts
