= Toby Sexsmith =

Canadian politician and ice hockey administrator (1885–1943)

Member of the Legislative Assembly of Manitoba for Portage la Prairie
- In office November 27, 1933 – August 23, 1943
- Preceded by: Fawcett Taylor
- Succeeded by: Charles Greenlay

Personal details
- Born: William Raymond Sexsmith; August 23, 1885 Napanee, Ontario, Canada
- Died: August 23, 1943 (aged 58) Portage la Prairie, Manitoba, Canada
- Party: Progressive Conservative
- Occupation: Lawyer
- Known for: Canadian Amateur Hockey Association and Manitoba Amateur Hockey Association president
- Awards: King's Counsel (1938)

William Raymond "Toby" Sexsmith KC (August 23, 1885 – August 23, 1943) was a Canadian politician and ice hockey administrator. He was elected three times as a Progressive Conservative Party member of the Legislative Assembly of Manitoba representing the Portage la Prairie riding from 1933 to 1943. He served as president of the Manitoba Amateur Hockey Association from 1921 to 1923, and sat on the association's executive committee for 25 years. He served as president of the Canadian Amateur Hockey Association (CAHA) from 1922 to 1924, and set a precedent that future CAHA presidents would also be given two-year terms.

The Allan Cup was formally recognized as the senior ice hockey championship of Canada while Sexsmith was CAHA president, and eligibility rules were expanded to allow more teams to compete for the title. Profits from the Allan Cup playoffs were invested into amateur and minor ice hockey and the Canada men's national ice hockey team. He began the efforts to establish a standard set of national ice hockey rules and amateur competitions between the United States and Canada. He sought to grow youth interest in the game and encourage sportsmanship, and spoke out against growing professionalism in the sport. He was the first president of the Portage Rink Company. He led efforts to build an arena and establish a team in Portage la Prairie in 1919, and oversaw construction of a second arena when the original was destroyed by fire in 1936.

Sexsmith was a lawyer before entering politics and was a partner with Arthur Meighen, the future Prime Minister of Canada. Sexsmith wanted improvements to infrastructure for drainage districts. He defended small businesses against the efforts of the Canadian Performing Rights Society, sought to reintroduce the 12-man jury system and the daytime speed limit in Manitoba, and supported using a compromise between representation by population and district representation. He was named a King's Counsel on January 1, 1938, in recognition of his legal career. He died in office on his 58th birthday, and was credited by the Winnipeg Free Press as a person who tackled contentious issues, and gave sound advice and constructive criticism.

== Early life and legal career ==
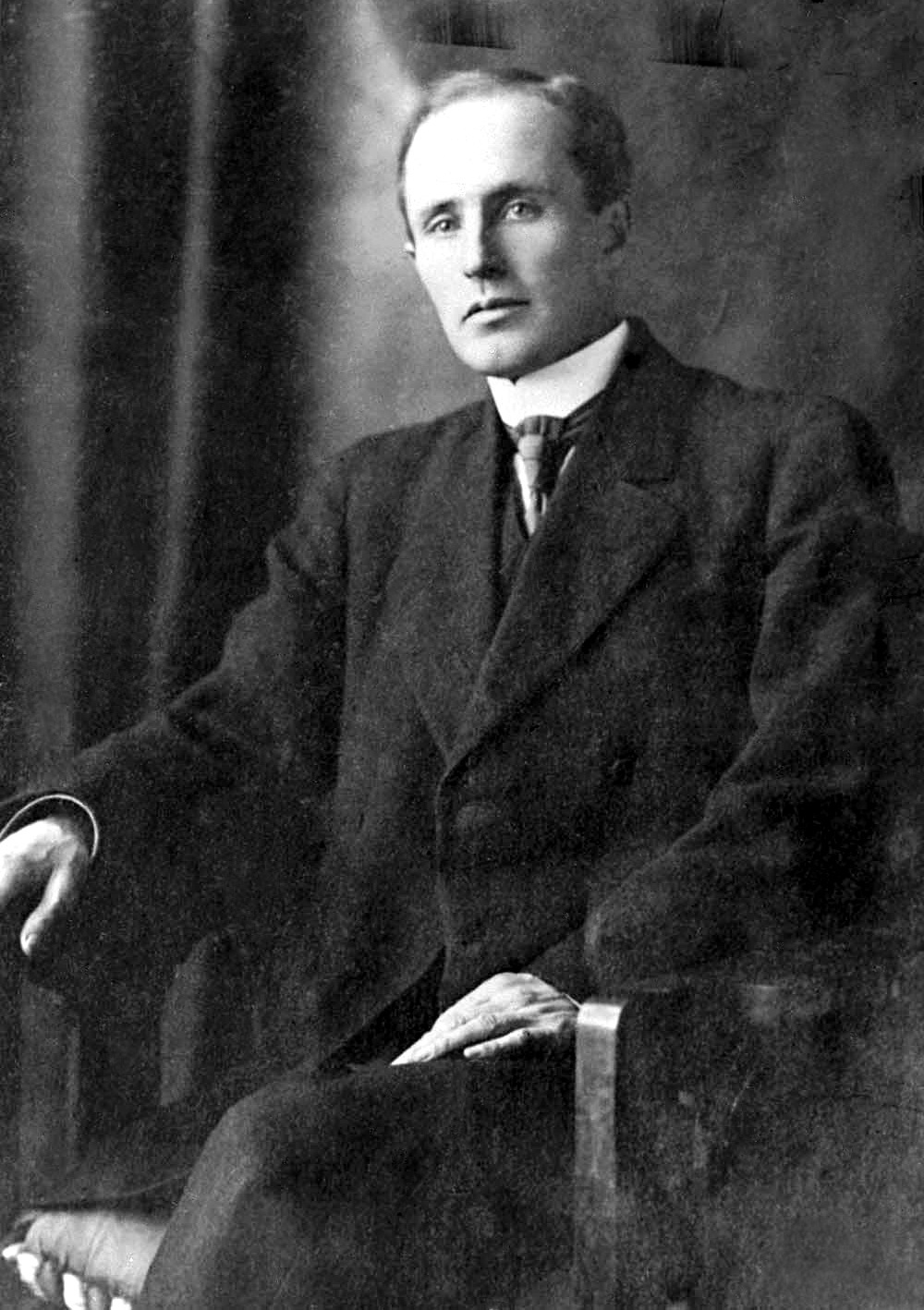
Arthur Meighen c. 1914 – c. 1919

Sexsmith was born on August 23, 1885, in Napanee, Ontario, to parents Tobias Sexsmith and Jane Metcalfe, and moved westward with his parents at a young age. He completed his secondary school education in Portage la Prairie while reporting for the Portage Review and the Portage Daily Graphic.

Sexsmith was known by the nickname "Toby" for most of his life. The name began during his time as an ice hockey player, and was reported by the Winnipeg Tribune to be linked to his father's name being Tobias. Sexsmith played as a winger on the 1906 Portage la Prairie men's ice hockey team, and was a teammate to Harry Scott. Sexsmith scored eleven goals in six games played for the Portage la Prairie Cities in the Manitoba Professional Hockey League. He had a career as an ice hockey referee after his playing days. He refereed senior ice hockey in Manitoba in 1912, and was still active as an official in 1924.

Sexsmith served as an articled clerk with the firm Cooper & Meighen in 1911, then solely articled for Arthur Meighen in 1913. Sexsmith was called to the bar on June 30, 1915, then became a full partner with Meighen. After Meighen became the Prime Minister of Canada in 1920, Sexsmith partnered with J. C. Miller in the firm Sexsmith & Miller until 1922, then practiced law independently for the remainder of his career.

== Hockey administrator ==
=== Early involvement ===
Sexsmith was primarily responsible for the fundraising efforts to build the Portage Rink in 1919. He applied to the Manitoba Amateur Hockey Association (MAHA) for a senior ice hockey team based in Portage la Prairie for the 1919–20 season but was recommended for the lower level intermediate league instead, despite raising C$20,000 to construct a new arena. The Portage Rink was initially built with a tarpaulin covering that was replaced by a permanent roof in 1921. The additional $8,000 upgrade brought the completed construction cost to $28,000.

Sexsmith later became involved with provincial and national sporting organizations. He was elected second vice-president of the Manitoba branch of the Amateur Athletic Union of Canada (AAU of C) in May 1920, and spoke out against growing professionalism in sport in Manitoba. He suggested that athletes competing for cash prizes be banned from ice hockey and other athletics. He also served as vice-president of the MAHA in 1920. In response to the AAU of C becoming more strict with player registrations, he felt the rule change by the MAHA to require player cards from the association where the player transferred from would be adequate, and no further action was required. He later served as MAHA president from 1921 to 1923.

=== CAHA president ===
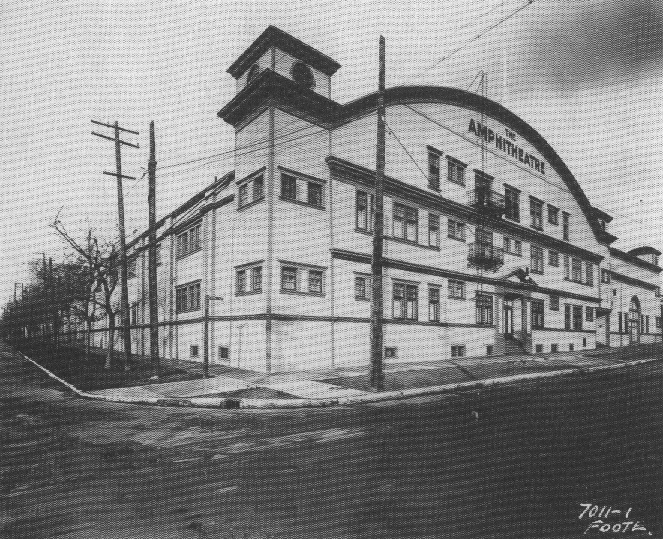
Winnipeg Amphitheatre

Sexsmith was elected president of the Canadian Amateur Hockey Association (CAHA) on March 20, 1922, at the general meeting in Toronto, and succeeded W. R. Granger as president. Sexsmith appointed MAHA secretary-treasurer Fred Marples to fill the same position at the national level. The CAHA requested changes to the expand the eligibility for the Allan Cup, the national championship of Canadian senior hockey. The Cup's trustees were asked to allow any intermediate-level team to partake in the national playoffs if they were able to defeat a senior-level team.

In September 1922, Sexsmith and the MAHA executive reserved the right to decide on which Winnipeg teams would participate in the Manitoba Senior Hockey League, after Winnipeg Amphitheatre ownership was unable to get an agreement on a league schedule.

Sexsmith was re-elected president of the CAHA on March 23, 1923. He was nominated for a second term by Ontario Hockey Association president W. A. Fry, who felt that a two-year term was needed for a president to be effective once he was familiar with the role, as opposed to changeover annually. The Winnipeg Tribune expected that future CAHA presidents would also be given two-year terms.

The CAHA and Allan Cup trustees reached an agreement in 1923, where profits from the Allan Cup playoffs would be held in trust and spent as requested by the CAHA. The Allan Cup was formally recognized as the senior ice hockey championship of Canada with an annual series of national playoffs. Teams participating in the semifinals and finals would have legitimate expenses reimbursed, with CAHA executives overseeing administration of schedules and finances. The agreement stipulated that a league must have at least three teams to be eligible for Allan Cup playoffs, and competition for the Cup remained subject to approval of the trustees.

The CAHA appointed a committee to establish a standard set of national ice hockey rules. A second committee was named to discuss the increasing migration of players between Canada and the United States, in response to the AAU of C desire to be the sole authority for determining amateur status in Canada. In co-operation with the United States Amateur Hockey Association, the Willis Trophy was inaugurated for amateur competitions between the two countries. Sexsmith ruled that clubs from the Thunder Bay Amateur Hockey Association would not play in the MAHA due to constant arguments over placement in divisions.

Sexsmith arranged for the 1924 Allan Cup finals to be played in Toronto instead of Ottawa, since the 1924 Stanley Cup Finals were moved from Montreal to Ottawa due to warm weather. The CAHA profited $5,865 from the 1924 Allan Cup playoffs, and contributed $2,000 towards the Canada men's national ice hockey team for their travels to ice hockey at the 1924 Winter Olympics.

=== CAHA past-president ===
The Allan Cup was the championship trophy for amateur senior ice hockey in Canada.

Sexsmith was succeeded as CAHA president by Silver Quilty at the general meeting in Toronto on March 29, 1924. Sexsmith negotiated an international exhibition series on behalf of the CAHA, between the 1926 Allan Cup champions from Port Arthur, Ontario, and the Central Hockey League champions from Duluth, Minnesota. He later sat on a special committee which oversaw the control of the Allan Cup transfer from its trustees to the CAHA.

Sexsmith remained involved with hockey at the provincial level in Manitoba, and was named an MAHA delegate to the AAU of C's Manitoba branch. He negotiated on behalf of the MAHA when the Winnipeg Hockey Club returned to Manitoba from the jurisdiction of the Thunder Bay Amateur Hockey Association, after questions of the team's eligibility for the Allan Cup due to playing in an out-of-province league.

Sexsmith toured central Manitoba on behalf of the MAHA to grow interest in minor ice hockey in 1925. He worked with the local Elks of Canada lodge in Portage la Prairie in 1926, to oversee youth hockey in the city and to encourage boys to play and learn sportsmanship.

=== Portage Rink Company ===
Sexsmith became the first president of the Portage Rink Company in 1919, and had been reelected every year since then. He continued to manage the Portage la Prairie intermediate level team within the MAHA, and later facilitated discussions to host a three-team intermediate level league based at the rink.

The Portage Rink was destroyed by fire early in the morning on September 13, 1936. Due to windy conditions that night, the fire spread quickly and the building could not be saved. Insurance covered only $7000 in damages, and Sexsmith arranged a meeting of shareholders to plan a new building. Portage la Prairie tax payers approved a by-law to begin construction of a new rink with a financial guarantee of $15,000 from the city. Work on the new arena began in late November 1936. The first game was played at the completed rink on January 13, 1937. The new Portage Rink was built using concrete, had seating for 1,900 spectators and standing room for another 700, included a public address system, and cost approximately $21,000 to build.

Sexsmith requested tax exemptions for the company from the city, to allow it to repay its bondholders. He declared the company a profitable business by 1941, and was a year-round community operation for ice sports in the winter and dances in the summer. He opened a skating bureau to accommodate the growing number of skating inquiries, and saw proceeds from skating increase as ice hockey decreased during World War II.

=== Later involvement ===
Sexsmith stated that ice hockey at the Olympic Games had become a farce by 1936, and should be eliminated. He felt that the money allocated to send a national team to Europe would be better spent on minor ice hockey in Canada. He was further opposed to the changes to the definition of amateur which the CAHA approved in 1936, which included allowing payments to players while away from work. He noted that the position of the MAHA as a whole was against the CAHA reforms that severed ties to the AAU of C.

Sexsmith attended the silver jubilee for the MAHA in October 1938, with five of six past-presidents in attendance. He also attended the silver jubilee for the CAHA in April 1939, with 11 of 13 past-presidents in attendance.

In October 1941, Sexsmith was elected to the Portage and District Hockey Club executive. By 1943, Sexsmith had sat on the MAHA executive committee for 25 years. Since being president, he had served on the registration committee, and acted as convenor for the intermediate level playoffs and the junior ice hockey B-level division.

== Political career ==
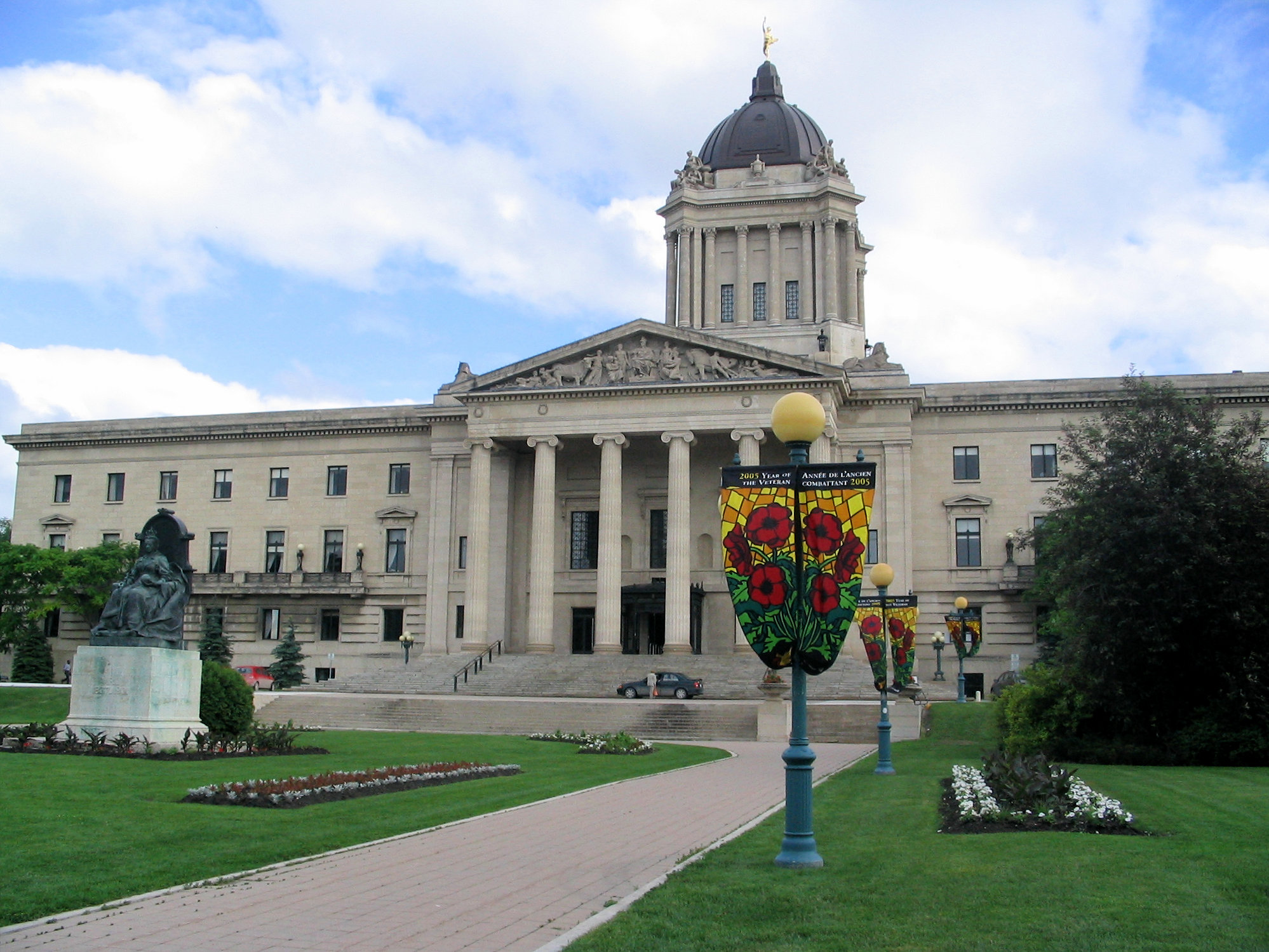
Manitoba Legislative Building

Sexsmith served as secretary-treasurer of the Portage la Prairie Progressive Conservative Party of Manitoba association for 25 years until 1933. On April 27, 1933, he was named as the Conservative candidate for the Portage la Prairie electoral district to replace Fawcett Taylor who resigned when he became a judge on the Court of Queen's Bench of Manitoba.

Sexsmith submitted a request at the first meeting of the provincial government since prorogation, to call a by-election to fill the vacancy in Portage la Prairie. In the subsequent campaign, the Winnipeg Free Press reported that political issues were absent in the by-election, which seemed to a popularity contest between Sexsmith, and another local hockey figure in E. A. Gilroy who ran as an independent candidate. A third candidate, H. A. Ireland of the Co-operative Commonwealth Federation was reported to be a long shot. Sexsmith won the 1933 by-election by 238 votes over Gilroy.

=== 19th Manitoba Legislature ===
Sexsmith served in the 19th Manitoba Legislature to represent the Portage la Prairie in opposition to the governing Liberal-Progressive coalition led by John Bracken. Sexsmith made his first speech in the legislature in March 1934, and declared himself a "true Blue Tory" and "a man of decided liberal and progressive views".

Sexsmith was critical of legislation which changed the current drainage districts and readjusted the corresponding debentures. He felt that by appointing a commission, the government was avoiding an issue it could deal with directly. He noted that outdated systems could not adequately protect agriculture from floods, and new highway construction left some areas more vulnerable than others, and estimated the problem to cost $6-million. He sought to expedite negotiations with the Government of Canada for relief payments, and protect Manitoba from interest on infrastructure projects which included improvements to drainage.

=== 20th Manitoba Legislature ===
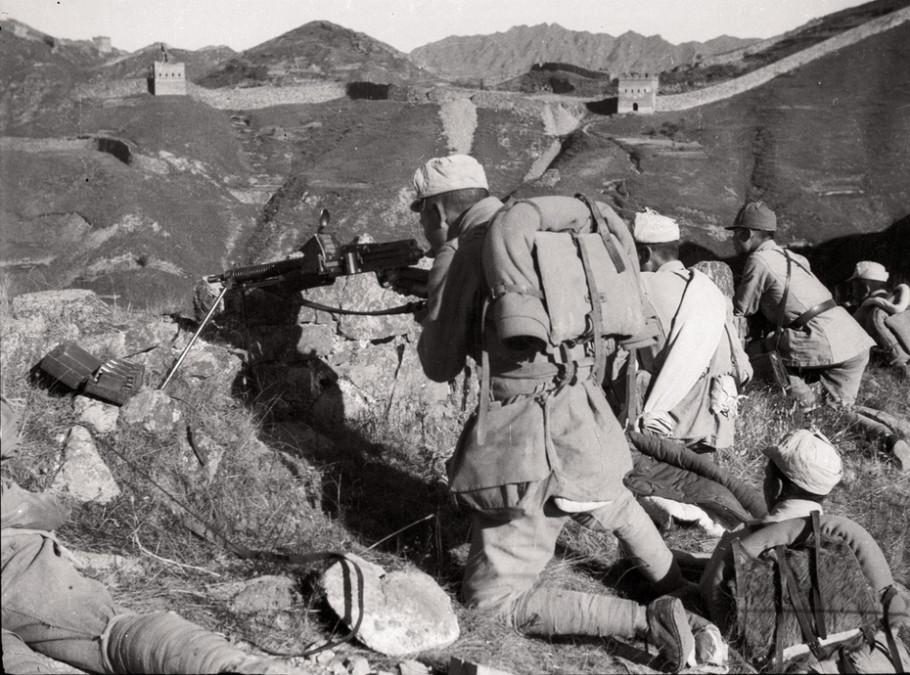
Battle at the Great Wall of China, during the 1937 invasion by Japan

Sexsmith and Gilroy ran against each other again in Portage la Prairie during the 1936 Manitoba general election. The Winnipeg Free Press described the election as a "Battle of Hockey Moguls". Gilroy was nominated this time as a Liberal-Progressive candidate, and had served as president of the CAHA from 1934 to 1936. Sexsmith was re-elected to represent Portage la Prairie in the 20th Manitoba Legislature, receiving 1,727 votes compared to 1,279 for Gilroy.

When the Manitoba legislature approved a motion to find ways to replace the existing income tax laws in 1937, Sexsmith stated the public had decided the existing tax laws be repealed and the motion misrepresented the position of the Conservative Party. Sexsmith supported a resolution calling for the Government of Canada to condemn the 1937 Japanese invasion of China, but did not support a boycott of Japanese goods. He felt the Manitoba legislature had no jurisdiction to regulate movement of goods which would be a national foreign policy.

During the 1938 sitting, Sexsmith responded to complaints against the Canadian Performing Rights Society by introducing a motion to limit the efforts of the society. He felt that collection of fees was detrimental to small businesses in which music was played, and it was an injustice to the public. He also sought to revise existing provincial legislation which "coddled people too much" who owed debts.

During the 1939 sitting, Sexsmith wanted to reintroduce the twelve-man jury system in Manitoba, which he felt was the better system. He noted that the older provinces in Canada had retained the larger jury, compared to the six-man jury being used in Western Canada. He also motioned to reintroduce the 50 miles per hour (80 km/h) daytime speed limit in Manitoba, and stated that two-thirds of accidents on Manitoba highways were caused by excessive speed. Sexsmith also remarked that, "No one in this province, with the possible exception of the premier when he flies by plane, need go faster than 50 miles an hour".

Sexsmith became chairman of the supporters of the Liberal-Progressive coalition government in October 1940. In December 1940, he argued that the coalition government pushed bills too fast through the house for the good of the public. He felt that bills should be scrutinized by one of the standing committees and give members time to adequately read the bill, instead of referring the bill to the whole house as the committee. He also felt the government was too slow in following-up on a bill to prevent members of illegal organizations from seeking elected office, which he felt would be a danger after World War II.

=== 21st Manitoba Legislature ===
Memorial Cup trophy

Sexsmith was acclaimed in the 1941 Manitoba general election to represent Portage la Prairie in the 21st Manitoba Legislature. When Premier Bracken asked legislature members if they would agree to a nighttime session of parliament on March 27, Sexsmith was opposed to longer hours while the Portage Terriers were in the 1942 Memorial Cup playoffs and felt compelled to support his hometown team. The session was adjourned as many other members had tickets to that night's game. The Terriers went on to win Portage la Prairie its first Memorial Cup and national championship.

In March 1942, Sexsmith introduced a bill to allow Portage la Prairie to impose a 2% tax on liquor sales to its permit holders. He explained that similar to legislation existed in Winnipeg to raise funds, and that Portage la Prairie had not paid interest on its debts in three years and were struggling since relief payments from the province had been reduced. The bill passed a second reading by a 28–18 vote. The law amendments committee rejected the bill by a 12–3 vote two days later. Sexsmith then took the matter to the citizens of Portage la Prairie to decide on whether to support a plebiscite for the tax.

When the Manitoba legislature discussed redistribution of ridings according to representation by population in March 1943, Sexsmith and fellow rural members supported using a compromise between population and district representation. He felt that giving more voting power to Winnipeg was a worse inequality than the current district representation.

=== Death in office ===
Sexsmith died early in the morning on August 23, 1943, at Portage General Hospital, on his 58th birthday. He was admitted to the hospital a week prior for surgery but his condition worsened unexpectedly. His funeral was held on August 26, 1943, at St. Mary's Anglican Church, and he was interred at Hillside Cemetery in Portage la Prairie.

While a member of the legislative assembly, Sexsmith was the only member known by his nickname. He was succeeded by Charles Greenlay, who won the 1943 by-election to represent Portage la Prairie.

== Personal life ==
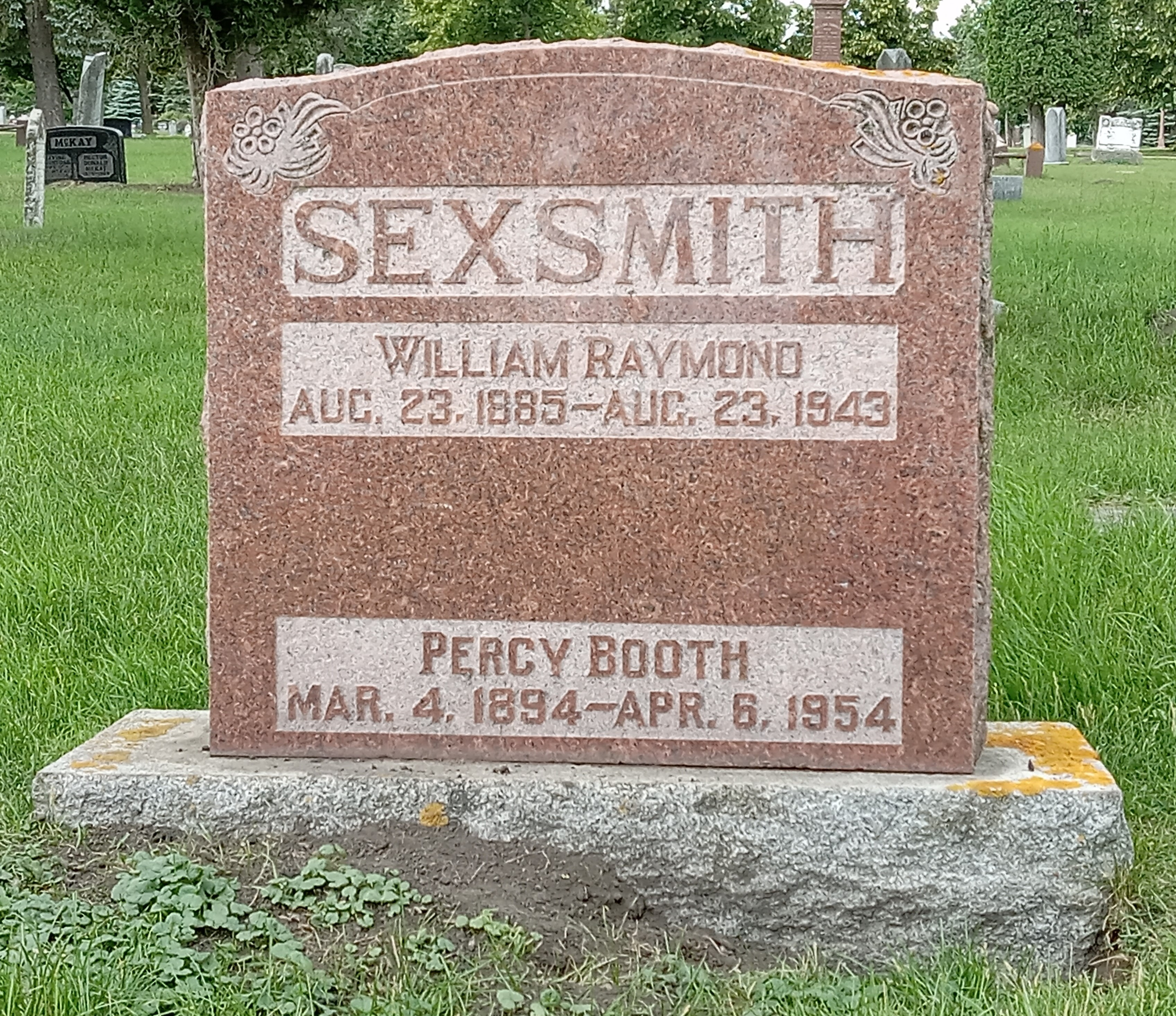
Sexsmith's grave at Hillside Cemetery

Sexsmith was an avid recreational hunter, and reportedly a good shot. He was a partial owner of a shooting lodge in Delta Beach, Manitoba, until the building was consumed by fire on November 1, 1920. He married Mildred Howell on November 19, 1927, and never had children. He was a member of the Knights of Pythias, the Elks of Canada, and the Anglican Church of Canada. He also served on the first council of the branch of St. John Ambulance Canada established in Portage la Prairie in December 1942.

== Honours and legacy ==
Sexsmith was the guest of honour at a banquet for him by the citizens of Portage la Prairie in 1923, in recognition of his sporting accomplishments and service as president of the CAHA. He received a medal for his services to the CAHA in April 1933, and was named a King's Counsel on January 1, 1938, in recognition of his legal career. He was also named as an honorary president of the MAHA, and the Portage Midget and Juvenile Hockey League.

In his obituary, the Winnipeg Free Press credited Sexsmith as a person who tackled contentious issues, and gave sound advice and constructive criticism. Stuart Garson, the Premier of Manitoba paid tribute to Sexsmith by praising his contribution to the community and encouragement of young people in sports, and said "Sexsmith was an exceptionally able member" of the legislature who was impartial and excelled at debate. Sexsmith was recognized with a moment of silence at the 1943 general meeting of the MAHA, and was posthumously made the namesake of the Toby Sexsmith Memorial Trophy awarded to the champion team of the B-level midget age group in Manitoba.
