= Roblin (electoral district, 1914–1981) =

Defunct provincial electoral district in Manitoba, Canada

Manitoba electoral district

Defunct provincial electoral district
- Legislature: Legislative Assembly of Manitoba
- District created: 1914
- District abolished: 1981
- First contested: July 10, 1914
- Last contested: 1977

Roblin is a former provincial electoral division in southwestern Manitoba, Canada, that existed from 1914 to 1981.

The riding was created by redistribution in 1914 from parts of Russell and Swan River, eliminated by redistribution in 1979, and formally ceased to exist with the 1981 provincial election.

Roblin was located in the province's mid-northwestern region. After its dissolution, most of its territory was incorporated into the new division of Roblin-Russell, with parts also going to Swan River and Dauphin. In 1999, the region was further redistributed as Dauphin—Roblin.

== Provincial representatives ==
Name	Party	Took office	Left office
Frederic Newton	Conservative	1914	1917
William Westwood	Independent-Liberal	1917	1920
Henry Richardson	Farmer	1920	1922
Frederic Newton	Conservative	1922	1932
William Westwood	Liberal–Progressive	1932	1936
Sydney Rogers	Social Credit	1936	1940
Sydney Rogers	Social Credit (Coalition)	1940	1945
Ronald Robertson	Independent (Coalition)	1945	1950
Ronald Robertson	Liberal–Progressive	1950	1958
Keith Alexander	Progressive Conservative	1958	1966
Wally McKenzie	Progressive Conservative	1966	1981 (riding abolished)
Riding abolished
