= Speaker of the Legislative Assembly of Manitoba =

Canadian provincial legislative officer

The Speaker of the Legislative Assembly of Manitoba is the presiding officer of the provincial legislature.

== List of speakers of the Legislative Assembly of Manitoba ==
No.	Portrait	Name Electoral district (Birth–Death)	Term of office		Party	Legislature
No.	Portrait	Name Electoral district (Birth–Death)	Term start	Term end	Party	Legislature
1		Joseph Royal; MLA for St. Francois Xavier West (1837–1902)	March 15, 1871	March 14, 1872	Government	1st
2		Curtis James Bird; MLA for St. Pauls (1838–1876)	February 5, 1873	December 22, 1874	Government	1st
3		Joseph Dubuc; MLA for St. Norbert (1840–1914)	March 31, 1875	December; 1878	Government	2nd
4		John Wright Sifton; MLA for St. Clements (1833–1912)	February 1, 1879	December; 1879	Government	3rd
5		Gilbert McMicken; MLA for Cartier (1813–1891)	January 21, 1880	December; 1882	Liberal-Conservative	4th
6		Alexander Murray; MLA for Assiniboia (1839–1913)	April 17, 1883	December; 1886	Conservative	5th
7		David Glass; MLA for St. Clements (1830–1906)	April 14, 1887	June; 1888	Independent	6th
8		William Winram; MLA for Manitou (1830–1906)	August 28, 1888	February 12, 1891	Liberal	7th
9		Samuel Jacob Jackson; MLA for Rockwood (1848–1942)	February 25, 1891	January 15, 1895	Liberal	7th
9		Samuel Jacob Jackson; MLA for Rockwood (1848–1942)	February 25, 1891	January 15, 1895	Liberal	8th
10		Finlay McNaughton Young; MLA for Killarney (1852–1916)	February 14, 1895	December; 1899	Liberal	8th
10		Finlay McNaughton Young; MLA for Killarney (1852–1916)	February 14, 1895	December; 1899	Liberal	9th
11		William Hespeler; MLA for Rosenfeld (1830–1921)	March 29, 1900	December; 1903	Independent Conservative	10th
12		James Johnson; MLA for Turtle Mountain (1855–1929)	January 7, 1904	January 6, 1916	Independent Conservative	11th
12		James Johnson; MLA for Turtle Mountain (1855–1929)	January 7, 1904	January 6, 1916	Conservative	12th
12		James Johnson; MLA for Turtle Mountain (1855–1929)	January 7, 1904	January 6, 1916	Conservative	13th
12		James Johnson; MLA for Turtle Mountain (1855–1929)	January 7, 1904	January 6, 1916	Conservative	14th
13		James Bryson Baird; MLA for Mountain (1859–1939)	January 6, 1916	January 24, 1922	Liberal	15th
13		James Bryson Baird; MLA for Mountain (1859–1939)	January 6, 1916	January 24, 1922	Liberal	16th
14		Philippe Adjutor Talbot; MLA for La Verendrye (1879–1967)	January 18, 1923	June 12, 1936	United Farmers	17th
14		Philippe Adjutor Talbot; MLA for La Verendrye (1879–1967)	January 18, 1923	June 12, 1936	Progressive	18th
14		Philippe Adjutor Talbot; MLA for La Verendrye (1879–1967)	January 18, 1923	June 12, 1936	Liberal-Progressive	19th
15		Robert Hawkins; MLA for Dauphin (1879–1962)	February 18, 1937	September 29, 1949	Liberal-Progressive	20th
15		Robert Hawkins; MLA for Dauphin (1879–1962)	February 18, 1937	September 29, 1949	Liberal-Progressive	21st
15		Robert Hawkins; MLA for Dauphin (1879–1962)	February 18, 1937	September 29, 1949	Liberal-Progressive	22nd
16		Wallace C. Miller; MLA for Rhineland (1896–1959)	February 14, 1950	August 15, 1950	Progressive Conservative	23rd
17		Nicholas Bachynsky; MLA for Fisher (1887–1969)	November 7, 1950	October 23, 1958	Liberal-Progressive	23rd
17		Nicholas Bachynsky; MLA for Fisher (1887–1969)	November 7, 1950	October 23, 1958	Liberal-Progressive	24th
18		Abram Harrison; MLA for Rock Lake (1898–1979)	October 23, 1958	February 27, 1963	Progressive Conservative	25th
18		Abram Harrison; MLA for Rock Lake (1898–1979)	October 23, 1958	February 27, 1963	Progressive Conservative	26th
19		Thelma Forbes; MLA for Cypress (1910–2012)	February 28, 1963	December 5, 1966	Progressive Conservative	27th
20		James Bilton; MLA for Swan River (1908–1988)	December 5, 1966	August 14, 1969	Progressive Conservative	28th
21		Ben Hanuschak; MLA for Burrows (born 1930)	August 14, 1969	August 20, 1970	New Democratic	29th
22		Peter Fox; MLA for Kildonan (1921–1989)	August 7, 1971	November 24, 1977	New Democratic	29th
22		Peter Fox; MLA for Kildonan (1921–1989)	August 7, 1971	November 24, 1977	New Democratic	30th
23		Harry Graham; MLA for Birtle-Russell (1921–2006)	November 24, 1977	October 13, 1981	Progressive Conservative	31st
24		Jim Walding; MLA for St. Vital (1937–2007)	February 25, 1982	February 11, 1986	New Democratic	32nd
25		Myrna Phillips; MLA for Wolseley (born 1942)	May 8, 1986	March 9, 1988	New Democratic	33rd
26		Denis Rocan; MLA for Turtle Mountain (until 1990); MLA for Gladstone (from 1990) (born 1949)	July 21, 1988	May 22, 1995	Progressive Conservative	34th
26		Denis Rocan; MLA for Turtle Mountain (until 1990); MLA for Gladstone (from 1990) (born 1949)	July 21, 1988	May 22, 1995	Progressive Conservative	35th
27		Louise Dacquay; MLA for Seine River (born 1940)	May 23, 1995	August 17, 1999	Progressive Conservative	36th
28		George Hickes; MLA for Point Douglas (born 1946)	November 18, 1999	October 20, 2011	New Democratic	37th
28		George Hickes; MLA for Point Douglas (born 1946)	November 18, 1999	October 20, 2011	New Democratic	38th
28		George Hickes; MLA for Point Douglas (born 1946)	November 18, 1999	October 20, 2011	New Democratic	39th
29		Daryl Reid; MLA for Transcona (born 1950)	October 20, 2011	March 16, 2016	New Democratic	40th
30		Myrna Driedger; MLA for Charleswood (until 2019); MLA for Roblin (from 2019) (born 1952)	May 18, 2016	November 9, 2023	Progressive Conservative	41st
30		Myrna Driedger; MLA for Charleswood (until 2019); MLA for Roblin (from 2019) (born 1952)	May 18, 2016	November 9, 2023	Progressive Conservative	42nd
31		Tom Lindsey; MLA for Flin Flon	November 9, 2023	Incumbent	New Democratic	43rd
