= Len Derkach =

Canadian politician

Minister of Education
- In office May 9, 1988 – April 21, 1989
- Preceded by: Roland Penner
- Succeeded by: Portfolio renamed

Member of the Legislative Assembly of Manitoba for Russell
- In office September 21, 1999 – October 4, 2011
- Preceded by: Riding established
- Succeeded by: Riding abolished

Member of the Legislative Assembly of Manitoba for Roblin-Russell
- In office March 18, 1986 – September 21, 1999
- Preceded by: Wally McKenzie
- Succeeded by: Riding abolished

Pelly Trail School Board Chair
- In office 1982–1985

Pelly Trail School Board Trustee
- In office 1979–1985

Personal details
- Born: Leonard Derkach; January 21, 1945 (age 81) Rossburn, Manitoba, Canada
- Party: Progressive Conservative
- Spouse: Margaret Ann Helten (m. 1974)
- Education: Brandon University
- Occupation: Teacher, farmer, school trustee, politician

Leonard "Len" Derkach (born January 21, 1945) is a former politician in Manitoba, Canada. He was a cabinet minister in the government of Gary Filmon, and was a member of the Manitoba legislature from 1986 to 2011.

The son of Nicholas Derkach and Minnie Kalyniak, both of Ukrainian descent, he was born in Rossburn, Manitoba, and was educated at Brandon University. He worked as a teacher and farmer before entering provincial politics. He was also a school board trustee on the Pelly Trail School Board from 1979 to 1985, serving as chair from 1982 to 1985.

In 1974, he married Margaret Ann Helten.

In 1986, Derkach was elected to the provincial legislature as a Progressive Conservative in Roblin-Russell, a rural riding in the province's southwest. Derkach defeated his New Democratic opponent, Fred Embryk, by 3,241 votes to 3,203. The NDP won the election, and Derkach became an opposition MLA.

The Progressive Conservatives won the provincial election of 1988, and Derkach was re-elected in Roblin-Russell by an increased margin (with the Liberals overtaking the NDP for second place). When Gary Filmon was sworn in as Premier on May 9, 1988, Derkach was named Minister of Education (which was renamed Minister of Education and Training on April 21, 1989). In this capacity, he increased funding for the province's private schools.

Derkach was easily re-elected in the provincial election of 1990. After a cabinet shuffle on January 14, 1992, he was named Minister of Rural Development. He was again re-elected in the provincial election of 1995, once more defeating Fred Embryk.

The Progressive Conservatives were defeated by the New Democrats in the provincial election of 1999. Derkach was re-elected in the renamed riding of Russell by a reduced margin, defeating New Democrat Vince Lelond by 595 votes. He resigned from cabinet with the rest of the Filmon ministry after the election.

Derkach served as opposition critic on matters relating to education and Manitoba's growing casino economy, and was re-elected by an increased margin in the general election of 2003, despite the poor province-wide showing of the Progressive Conservative Party.

In addition to serving as a cabinet minister, Derkach also served as Director of the Canada Ukraine Legislative Education Project while in government. He was re-elected in the 2007 election.

In 2011, Derkach announced he would not seek an eighth term in the legislature.

In 2014 Derkach ran for Mayor of the Rural Municipality of Russell-Binscarth and served one term before being defeated in the 2018 Manitoba municipal elections.

In 2026 Derkach declared his candidacy once again for Mayor of Russell–Binscarth.
