= Lloyd Hyde =

Canadian politician

Member of the Legislative Assembly of Manitoba for Portage La Prairie
- In office October 11, 1977 – August 25, 1985
- Preceded by: Peter Burtniak
- Succeeded by: Ed Connery

Personal details
- Born: April 20, 1920; Burnside, Manitoba
- Died: August 25, 1985 (aged 65)

Lloyd George Hyde (April 24, 1920 in Burnside, Manitoba – August 25, 1985) was a politician in Manitoba, Canada. He served as a Progressive Conservative member of the Legislative Assembly of Manitoba from 1977 until his death in 1985.

== Early life ==
The son of Joseph Hyde and Frances Troop, he was educated in Burnside and Portage la Prairie and worked as a farmer after attending high school. He also served with an artillery unit in the Canadian Forces from 1941 to 1945. Hyde subsequently became a Director of the Portage Industrial Exhibition and an Associate Member of the Portage la Prairie District Planning Scheme, as well as a freemason. He also was an active member of the local Barber Quartet Society. In 1946, Hyde married Isabel Margaret Spriggs.

== Political career ==
He was first elected to the Manitoba legislature in the 1977 election, defeating his New Democratic opponent by about 1,500 votes in the riding of Portage la Prairie. The Tories won a majority government in this election, although Hyde was not appointed to the cabinet of Premier Sterling Lyon.

The Tories were defeated in the provincial election of 1981, although Hyde easily retained his own riding. He continued serving as an MLA until his death in 1985.
