= David Faurschou =

Canadian politician

Member of the Legislative Assembly of Manitoba for Portage la Prairie
- In office September 30, 1997 – October 4, 2011
- Preceded by: Brian Pallister
- Succeeded by: Ian Wishart

Personal details
- Born: David Faurschou; January 28, 1956 (age 70)
- Party: Progressive Conservative

David Faurschou (born January 28, 1956) is a politician in Manitoba, Canada. From 1997 to 2011, he was a member of the Manitoba legislature.

== Biography ==
Faurschou was born in Portage la Prairie, Manitoba, the eldest son of Ralph and Ella Faurschou. He has a diploma in Agriculture from the University of Manitoba, and a Professional Agronomist degree from the Manitoba Institute of Agrologists. He served as a summer student with the Royal Canadian Mounted Police in The Pas and Arborg and in 1980, after graduation, returned to Portage and the family business. Faurschou served as vice president and general manager of Faurschou Farms Limited, and served on the Central Plains Farm Business Association. He was named Manitoba's Outstanding Young Farmer in 1995, and Canada's Outstanding Young Farmer in 1995.

Faurschou served was a trustee in the Portage la Prairie School Division, and served as a chairman of the Manitoba Association of School Trustees. He also served as director of the Portage Women's Shelter. Faurschou was elected to the Manitoba legislature for Portage la Prairie as a Progressive Conservative in a 1997 by-election, replacing Brian Pallister (who had resigned to run federally). In 1998, Faurschou was appointed legislature assistant to the Minister of Rural Development.

Faurschou was re-elected in 1999, and more narrowly re-elected in the 2003 election, defeating Bob Kriski by 3,524 votes to 3,023. He was returned again in the 2007 election. He did not run in 2011 election.
