= Jean Friesen =

Canadian politician

Jean Friesen (born July 30, 1939 or 1943) is a politician in Manitoba, Canada. She served in the Legislative Assembly of Manitoba for thirteen years, and was a member of New Democratic Premier Gary Doer's cabinet from 1999 to 2003.

Friesen was born in Oldham, Lancashire, in England, and moved to Canada at a young age, when her father, Reg Edwards, took up a teaching position at McGill University. She received a bachelor's degree from McGill University and a PhD from the University of British Columbia during the 1960s. Friesen was employed by the National Museum of Canada from 1967 to 1973, and has been a faculty member in the University of Manitoba's Department of History since that time. In 1991, she co-edited a work entitled Aboriginal Resource Use in Canada: Historical and Legal Aspects.

Friesen was first elected to the Manitoba legislature in the 1990 provincial election, defeating incumbent Liberal Harold Taylor by over one thousand votes in the central-Winnipeg riding of Wolseley. The election was won by the Progressive Conservatives, and Friesen joined nineteen other New Democrats in the official opposition. In the 1995 provincial election, she was re-elected for Wolseley in a landslide. Also in 1995, she supported Lorne Nystrom for the federal New Democratic Party leadership.

The NDP were victorious in the election of 1999, and Friesen again scored an easy victory in her own riding. She was appointed Deputy Premier of Manitoba and Minister of Intergovernment Affairs on October 5, 1999, also receiving ministerial responsibility for Cooperative Development on September 25, 2002. Also in 2002, she defended the provincial government's controversial decision to spray malathion in the Winnipeg area, as a means of controlling the city's insect population during an outbreak of West Nile fever.

In 2003, she supported Bill Blaikie's campaign to lead the federal New Democratic Party.

Friesen did not run for re-election in 2003, and formally stepped down from cabinet on June 25 of that year. She has subsequently returned to her teaching position at the University of Manitoba, and in 2004 issued a work entitled Magnificent Gifts: The Treaties of Canada with Indians of the Northwest, 1869-76.

== Election results ==
1990 Manitoba general election: Wolseley
Party	Candidate	Votes	%
Liberal	Harold Taylor (incumbent)	2,520	33.9
New Democratic	Jean Friesen	3,265	43.9
Progressive Conservative	Fay Campbell	1,503	20.2
Progressive	Gordon Pratt	149	2.0
Total valid votes		7,437	100.00
Source: Elections Manitoba

1995 Manitoba general election: Wolseley
Party	Candidate	Votes	%
Liberal	Marilyn MacKinnon	1,577	22.0
New Democratic	Jean Friesen (incumbent)	4,048	56.4
Progressive Conservative	David Kovnats	1,555	21.7
Total valid votes		7,180	100.00
Source: Elections Manitoba

1999 Manitoba general election: Wolseley
Party	Candidate	Votes	%
Green	Phyllis Abbé	356	4.7
New Democratic	Jean Friesen (incumbent)	5,282	69.2
Progressive Conservative	Carol Friesen	1,685	22.1
Communist	David Allison	133	1.7
Total valid votes		7,456	100.00
Source: Elections Manitoba
