= Harvey Smith (Canadian politician) =

Canadian politician

Winnipeg City Councillor for Sargent Park
- In office 1980–1986

Member of the Legislative Assembly of Manitoba for Ellice
- In office March 18, 1986 – April 26, 1988
- Preceded by: Brian Corrin
- Succeeded by: Avis Gray

Personal details
- Born: November 6, 1936 Vancouver, British Columbia
- Died: March 12, 2017 (aged 80) Winnipeg, Manitoba
- Education: University of British Columbia; Simon Fraser University
- Occupation: Politician

Harvey Smith (November 6, 1936 – March 12, 2017) was a Canadian politician who served on Winnipeg's city council and in the Manitoba Legislative Assembly.

He was born in Vancouver, British Columbia, grew up in Winnipeg and first became involved in politics at the age of twelve. He joined the British Columbia Social Credit Party when it was still a fringe organization.

Smith obtained a Bachelor of Arts degree in economics and history from the University of British Columbia, a Bachelor of Education from Simon Fraser University and worked as a teacher in Birtle, Manitoba. He sought the Progressive Conservative nomination for a February 1969 provincial by-election in the Birtle-Russell electoral division, but lost to Harry Graham. He later became involved with the New Democratic Party (NDP). He was elected to the Winnipeg City Council in 1980 for the division of Sargent Park, retaining his seat until 1986.

In the provincial election of 1986, Smith was elected in the Winnipeg riding of Ellice, defeating Progressive Conservative Seech Gajadharsingh by over 2,000 votes. He was not appointed to the cabinet of Howard Pawley, and lost to Liberal Avis Gray by 724 votes in the 1988 election.

In 1998, Smith came out of political retirement to run for the Winnipeg City Council again, representing the Daniel McIntyre Ward on city council. In 2002, he was re-elected over Maureen Pendergast by almost 3000 votes. Despite being the incumbent candidate, Smith lost the endorsement of the NDP going into the 2010 civic election in favour of Pat Martin's constituency assistant Keith Bellamy. Smith decided to contest this decision and ran as an independent in the 2010 Winnipeg civic election. On October 27, 2010, Smith won a narrow victory over four other candidates and retained his seat as councillor for the Daniel McIntyre ward.

In 2004, he filled out the NDP nomination forms for a provincial by-election in the riding of Minto, but soon withdrew from the race. In the city council election of October 22, 2014, he lost to Cindy Gilroy.

Smith died on March 12, 2017, at the age of 80 following a brief illness. He was not married and did not have any children.
