= John Christianson =

Canadian politician (1923–2010)

John Aaron Christianson (November 23, 1923 – December 15, 2010) was a politician and educator in Manitoba. He served in the Legislative Assembly of Manitoba as a Progressive Conservative from 1959 to 1962 and was a cabinet minister in the government of Dufferin Roblin.

Christianson was born in Langruth, Manitoba, Canada. He was educated at the University of Manitoba, earning a Bachelor of Science degree in Mechanical Engineering. He worked as an automobile and implement agent, and was the president of Christianson Ltd. and Koko Platz Development Ltd. From 1942 to 1945, he served as a pilot in the Royal Canadian Air Force. Concurrent with his career in provincial politics, he was a city alderman in Portage la Prairie in 1959-60.

He was elected to the Manitoba legislature in the 1959 provincial election, defeating incumbent Liberal-Progressive Charles Greenlay by 473 votes in the Portage la Prairie constituency. He was appointed to Roblin's cabinet on October 25, 1961 as Minister of Welfare.

Christianson's time in office was brief, as he narrowly lost his seat to Liberal candidate Gordon Johnston in the 1962 election. He formally resigned from cabinet on February 27, 1963. He attempted a return to the legislature in the 1966 election, but again lost to Johnston by an increased margin. Some believe Christianson lost his riding because of local opposition to the Portage Diversion flood relief project.

He was president of Mini Skools day care centres and opened 48 schools across North America. Christianson went on to serve as a student counselor at the University of Winnipeg. After his retirement, he became co-founder and vice-chair of Canadian International College, an English language university for Japanese students.

He died in Winnipeg, Manitoba, Canada due to complications from bone cancer.
