= 1924 Allan Cup =

Canadian senior ice hockey championship

The Allan Cup trophy

The 1924 Allan Cup was the Canadian senior ice hockey championship for the 1923–24 season. Canadian Amateur Hockey Association (CAHA) president Toby Sexsmith moved the finals to Toronto instead of Ottawa, since the 1924 Stanley Cup Finals were moved from Montreal to Ottawa due to warm weather. The CAHA profited $5,865 from the 1924 Allan Cup playoffs, and contributed $2,000 towards the Canada men's national ice hockey team for their travels to ice hockey at the 1924 Winter Olympics.

As of 1924, the CAHA excluded senior teams representing a commercial organization from playing, after cup trustee Claude C. Robinson noted that no such clause existed in the constitution.

== Final ==
2 games total goals

- Sault Ste. Marie 6 Selkirk 2
- Selkirk 1 Sault Ste. Marie 0

Sault Ste. Marie Greyhounds beat Selkirk 6 goals to 3.
