= Avis Gray =

Canadian politician

Member of the Legislative Assembly of Manitoba for Crescentwood
- In office September 15, 1992 – April 25, 1995
- Preceded by: Jim Carr
- Succeeded by: Tim Sale

Member of the Legislative Assembly of Manitoba for Ellice
- In office April 26, 1988 – September 11, 1990
- Preceded by: Harvey Smith
- Succeeded by: Riding abolished

Personal details
- Born: September 3, 1954 (age 72) Virden, Manitoba, Canada
- Education: University of Manitoba

Avis Gray (born September 3, 1954) is a politician in Manitoba, Canada. She was a member of the Legislative Assembly of Manitoba from 1988 to 1990, and again from 1992 to 1995.

== Biography ==
Gray was born in Virden, Manitoba, and was educated at the University of Manitoba. She subsequently worked as a home economist, and was a member of the Manitoba Home Economics Association and the Canadian Home Economics Association.

Gray was first elected to the Manitoba legislature in the 1988 provincial election as a Liberal, defeating incumbent New Democrat Harvey Smith by 624 votes in the central Winnipeg riding of Ellice. The election was won by the Progressive Conservatives, and Gray joined 19 other Liberals in the official opposition. She argued for an increase in welfare rates during this period.

The Liberals fell back to seven seats in the 1990 provincial election, and Gray lost to NDP candidate Conrad Santos by 108 votes. Two years later, she returned to the legislature via a by-election in the south Winnipeg riding of Crescentwood, defeating NDP candidate Tim Sale by 441 votes.

Despite an early lead in the polls, the Manitoba Liberal Party ran a poor campaign in the 1995 provincial election and fell from seven to three seats. Gray placed last in a close three-way race in Crescentwood, finishing behind Sale and PC candidate Debbie Vivian. She has not sought a return to the legislature since this time.

Gray worked as the campaign manager for federal Liberal cabinet minister Reg Alcock when he ran for re-election in Winnipeg South in the 2004 federal election, and was subsequently hired as a lobbyist of the Canadian Wheat Board, a department under Alcock's ministry.

== Election results ==
1988 Manitoba general election: Ellice
Party	Candidate	Votes	%	±%
Liberal	Avis Gray	3,081	42.88	+29.45
New Democratic	Harvey Smith	2,457	34.20	-23.47
Progressive Conservative	Alex Arenson	1,538	21.41	-3.62
Western Independence	Susan Caine	109	1.52	n/a
Turnout		7,224	71.78	
Liberal gain from New Democratic		Swing		+26.46
Source: Elections Manitoba

Manitoba provincial by-election, September 15, 1992: Crescentwood Resignation of Jim Carr
Party	Candidate	Votes	%	±%
Liberal	Avis Gray	2,697	33.86	-17.32
New Democratic	Tim Sale	2,256	28.33	+6.59
Progressive Conservative	Jenny Hillard	1,995	25.05	-7.56
Progressive	Sidney Green	900	11.30	n/a
Reform	Ken Carver	97	1.22	n/a
Libertarian	Dennis Rice	19	0.24	n/a
Total valid votes		7,964	100.00	-
Rejected ballots			–	–
Turnout				
Eligible voters				

1995 Manitoba general election: Crescentwood
Party	Candidate	Votes	%	±%
New Democratic	Tim Sale	3,733	36.04	7.75
Progressive Conservative	Debbie Vivian	3,455	33.36	8.36
Liberal	Avis Gray	3,170	30.60	-3.34
Total valid votes		10,358	–	–
Rejected		36	–	
Eligible voters / Turnout		14,203	73.18	–
Source(s) Source: Manitoba. Chief Electoral Officer (1999). Statement of Votes for the 37th Provincial General Election, September 21, 1999 (PDF) (Report). Winnipeg: Elections Manitoba.
