= Ian Wishart (politician) =

Canadian politician

Manitoba Minister of Education and Training
- In office May 3, 2016 – August 1, 2018
- Premier: Brian Pallister
- Preceded by: James Allum
- Succeeded by: Kelvin Goertzen

Member of Legislative Assembly of Manitoba for Portage la Prairie
- In office October 4, 2011 – September 5, 2023
- Preceded by: David Faurschou
- Succeeded by: Jeff Bereza

Personal details
- Born: c. 1954 (age 71–72)
- Party: Progressive Conservative
- Occupation: Farmer

Ian Robert Wishart (born c. 1954) is a Canadian politician and member of the Legislative Assembly of Manitoba, who represented the electoral district of Portage la Prairie as a member of the Progressive Conservative Party of Manitoba until 2023. He was first elected in the 2011 provincial election, and re-elected in 2016 and 2019.

On May 3, 2016 Wishart was appointed to the Executive Council of Manitoba as Minister of Education and Training. He was shuffled out of cabinet on August 1, 2018, and appointed the Legislative Assistant to the Minister of Education and Training, tasked with coordinating a thorough review of the kindergarten to grade 12 education system in Manitoba.

== Electoral record ==
2019 Manitoba general election: Portage la Prairie
Party	Candidate	Votes	%	±%	Expenditures
Progressive Conservative	Ian Wishart	4,502	65.67	-4.87	$12,039.73
New Democratic	Andrew Podolecki	1,508	22.00	+11.39	$681.34
Liberal	Charles Huband	845	12.33	-6.52	$4,239.60
Total		6,855	98.70	–	
Rejected		90	1.30	-0.47	
Turnout		6,945	48.64	-2.69	
Eligible voters		14,279			
Progressive Conservative hold		Swing		-8.13	
Source(s) Source: Manitoba. Chief Electoral Officer (2019). Statement of Votes for the 42nd Provincial General Election, September 10, 2019 (PDF) (Report). Winnipeg: Elections Manitoba.

2016 Manitoba general election: Portage la Prairie
Party	Candidate	Votes	%	±%
Progressive Conservative	Ian Wishart	4,635	70.55%	18.31%
Liberal	Stephen J. Prince	1,238	18.84%	10.40%
New Democratic	Alex MacDonald	697	10.61%	-28.71%
Total		6,570	–	–
Rejected		44	0.66	
Eligible voters / turnout		13,029	50.43%	-0.32%
Source(s) Source: Manitoba. Chief Electoral Officer (2016). Statement of Votes for the 41st Provincial General Election, April 19, 2016 (PDF) (Report). Winnipeg: Elections Manitoba.

2011 Manitoba general election: Portage la Prairie
Party	Candidate	Votes	%	±%	Expenditures
Progressive Conservative	Ian Wishart	3,566	52.24	3.93%	$17,302.23
New Democratic	James Kostuchuk	2,689	39.39	-3.08%	$6,997.42
Liberal	Michelle Cudmore-Armstrong	571	8.37	-0.85%	$5,176.36
Total		6,861	–	–	
Rejected		30	–		
Eligible voters / turnout		13,521	50.74%	-6.25%	
Source: Elections Manitoba
