= Gordon Johnston (politician) =

Canadian politician (1920-2005)

Gordon Ellwood Johnston (October 15, 1920 – November 7, 2005) was a politician in Manitoba, Canada. He was a Liberal member of the Legislative Assembly of Manitoba from 1962 to 1977.

== Before politics ==
Johnston was born in Portage la Prairie, Manitoba and was educated there. He served with the Royal Canadian Air Force from 1941 to 1945 and was a prisoner of war in Germany from 1943 to 1945. After the war, Johnston worked as an underwriter for Manufacturer's Life Insurance Company, then from 1948 to 1952 at the Portage la Prairie Post Office and then operated his own grocery store.

== Political career ==
He was an alderman in Portage la Prairie from 1959 to 1962. He was first elected to the Manitoba legislature in the general election of 1962, defeating incumbent Progressive Conservative John Christianson by 290 votes in Portage la Prairie. In the 1966 election, he was re-elected over Christianson by 735 votes.

From 1966 to 1968, Johnston was executive director of the Liberal Party of Manitoba.

The once-dominant Liberal Party was the official legislative opposition for most of the 1960s, and its support dropped even lower in the election of 1969. The party won only five seats, and Johnston was re-elected over Tory candidate Harvey Carmichael by only eleven votes. After the election, he offered to serve as Speaker of the legislature to allow Edward Schreyer's New Democratic Party to form a minority government.

Liberal Party leader Robert Bend was defeated in the 1969 election, and Johnston was chosen to serve as house leader until a permanent replacement could be chosen. He endorsed John Nesbitt's unsuccessful bid for the party leadership in 1970. He was one of only two opposition members who voted to amalgamate the city of Winnipeg in 1971.

Johnston increased his margin of victory to 36 votes in the election of 1973, over Tory George Fairfield. His party's fortunes continued to decline in this period, and he did not seek re-election in 1977.

== Later life ==
From 1978 to 1984, he was a citizenship court judge for Manitoba and then, from 1984 to 1998, a marriage commissioner for the province. Johnston died in Winnipeg at the age of 85.

== Personal life ==
He was married twice: first to Myra Campbell Brown and later to Maria after the death of his first wife.
