= Charles Greenlay =

Canadian politician (1899-1984)

Charles Edwin Greenlay (June 8, 1899 in High Bluff, Manitoba – May 27, 1984) was a politician in Manitoba, Canada. He served in the Legislative Assembly of Manitoba from 1943 to 1959, and was a cabinet minister in the governments of Stuart Garson and Douglas Campbell.

== Early life ==
Born at High Bluff, on 8 June 1899, son of Gardner Greenlay and Eliza Donnelly, he was educated at High Bluff and the Portage Collegiate Institute. He ran a garage at High Bluff until 1930, when he entered political life. On 8 November 1930, he married Gladys B. Northcott, daughter of George H. Northcott, of Portage la Prairie. Together they had three children: Norma, Gayle, and Andrew. He was also active member of the Methodist Church, and was instrumental in the formation of the United Church in Portage la Prairie, Manitoba.

== Political life ==
Greenlay first entered political life in 1930 as the Secretary-Treasurer of the Rural Municipality of Portage la Prairie. In 1943, persuaded by his childhood friend, Douglas Lloyd Campbell, to pursue provincial politics, he was first elected to the Manitoba legislature in a by-election held on November 18, 1943, replacing Toby Sexsmith. At this time, Manitoba was governed by a coalition of Liberal-Progressives and Conservatives. Running in Portage la Prairie, Greenlay easily won election as a pro-coalition Conservative. Shortly after his election, the Conservatives renamed themselves as Progressive Conservatives.

Greenlay was re-elected as a coalition Progressive Conservative in the general election of 1945, defeating opponents from the Cooperative Commonwealth Federation and Labour Progressive Party. On February 14, 1946, he was appointed to Stuart Garson's cabinet as Provincial Secretary. When Douglas Campbell replaced Garson as Premier of Manitoba on December 14, 1948, he named Greenlay as his Minister of Labour. Greenlay would hold this portfolio until 1958, usually in tandem with other ministerial responsibilities.

Greenlay was re-elected without opposition in the 1949 provincial election. The following year, the Progressive Conservatives left the coalition government to sit on the opposition benches. Greenlay opposed this decision, and left the Progressive Conservatives to sit as a Liberal-Progressive. He was named Provincial Secretary again on February 13, 1950, also retaining the Minister of Labour portfolio.

Greenlay was re-elected as a Liberal-Progressive in the 1953 election, defeating his Progressive Conservative opponent by 324 votes. After a cabinet shuffle on September 4, 1953, he was named Minister of Mines and Natural Resources. During this time, he was instrumental in the leadership to create a recreational area for all Manitobans to enjoy, the Whiteshell Provincial Park. On July 6, 1956, he was promoted to Provincial Treasurer.

The Liberal-Progressives were defeated by the Progressive Conservatives in the 1958 provincial election, although Greenlay was re-elected in Portage la Prairie with an increased majority. In the 1959 election, however, he lost his seat to Progressive Conservative candidate John Christianson by 473 votes. Likeable on a personal level, he was a very conservative administrator. His decision to switch parties in 1950 was met with little controversy.

== Later life ==
Following his defeat to J. A. Christianson in the 1959 general election, he returned to municipal government as Secretary-Treasurer of the Municipality of Charleswood, serving there until retirement in 1968. Upon retiring, Greenlay and his wife, Gladys, relocated back to Portage la Prairie, where he lived until his death in 1984. During his entire life, Greenlay maintained a cottage at Delta Beach, where he enjoyed fishing, hunting, as well as entertaining many friends and family.

He died in Portage la Prairie at the age of 84.
