= John Drummond (Manitoba politician) =

Canadian politician

John Aldham Kyte Drummond (December 3, 1847 – September 10, 1913) was a Scottish-born farmer and political figure in Manitoba. He represented High Bluff from 1879 to 1883 in the Legislative Assembly of Manitoba.

He was born in Edinburgh, the son of Thomas Drummond and Mary Ferguson Kyte, and was educated there and in Kingston, Ontario. In 1872, Drummond married Evadne L. Ironside. He was struck and killed by a railway train while working in Kingston for James Richardson and Sons.
