= William Garland (politician) =

Canadian politician

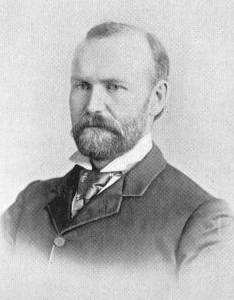

Member of the Legislative Assembly of Manitoba for Portage la Prairie
- In office 1900–1901

Personal details
- Born: December 4, 1856; Carleton Country, Canada West
- Died: November 11, 1901 (aged 44); Phoenix, Arizona, US

William Garland (December 4, 1856 – November 11, 1901) was a Canadian merchant and political figure in Manitoba. He represented Portage la Prairie from 1900 to 1901 in the Legislative Assembly of Manitoba as a Conservative.

He was born in Carleton County, Canada West, the son of John Garland and Mary Ann Wright, both natives of Ireland. Garland was educated there and went on to work for Garland & Mutchmore, a dry goods firm in Ottawa, Ontario. He came to Winnipeg in 1881 to work for R.J. Whitla. In 1882, Garland established his own dry goods business in Portage la Prairie. He served as mayor of Portage la Prairie, also serving as chairman of the Board of Works and as chairman of the Board of Health. Garland also was president of the Board of Trade. He ran unsuccessfully for a seat in the provincial assembly in an 1892 by-election before being elected in 1899.

Garland was married twice: first to Alice M. Howe in 1882 and then to Eliza Brown in 1896 after the death of his first wife.

He died in office in Phoenix, Arizona.
