= Alexander Black (Canadian politician) =

Provincial politician (1832–1913)

Alexander Kamloop Black (1832 – December 14, 1913) was a political figure in Manitoba. He represented St. Pauls from 1876 to 1878 in the Legislative Assembly of Manitoba.

== Biography ==
He was elected to the Manitoba assembly in an 1876 by-election held following the death of Curtis Bird. He served in the Legislative Assembly until 1878 and did not seek re-election at the end of his term. During his time in office, he was identified as a government supporter. Black died in San Francisco.

== Family ==
He was born in Île-à-la-Crosse, the son of Samuel Black and Angelique Cameron.

In 1859, Black married Margaret Miller.
