= Harold Taylor (Canadian politician) =

Canadian politician

Harold Taylor is a politician in Manitoba, Canada. He was a member of the Legislative Assembly of Manitoba from 1988 to 1990, representing the riding of Wolseley for the Manitoba Liberal Party.

In 1983 and 1986, he was elected to the Winnipeg City Council in the Memorial district, as an independent candidate supporting the Liberal Party.

Taylor was elected to the Manitoba legislature in the 1988 provincial election, defeating incumbent New Democrat Myrna Phillips by 506 votes. The Liberals increased their parliamentary strength from one to twenty in this election, and Taylor sat with the official opposition for the next two years. In the 1990 provincial election, he lost to NDP candidate Jean Friesen by 1045 votes.

Taylor subsequently became involved in water conservation, serving as executive director of the Red River Basin Commission. He has also worked on the Pembina River Basin Advisory Board and the Water Strategy Advisory Committee.

== Election results ==
1988 Manitoba general election: Wolseley
Party	Candidate	Votes	%	±%
Liberal	Harold Taylor	3,618	42.78	+
New Democratic	Myrna Phillips	3,112	36.79	-
Progressive Conservative	Kirk Stanley	1,579	18.67	-
Progressive	Derek Shettler	149	1.76	
Total valid votes		8,458	100.00	-
Rejected ballots		33	–	–
Turnout		8,491	74.44	
Eligible voters		11,406		
Source: Elections Manitoba
