= Myrna Phillips =

Canadian politician (born 1942)

Myrna A. Phillips

25th Speaker of the Legislative Assembly of Manitoba
- In office May 8, 1986 – March 9, 1988
- Preceded by: Jim Walding
- Succeeded by: Denis Rocan

Member of the Legislative Assembly of Manitoba for Wolseley
- In office November 17, 1981 – April 26, 1988
- Preceded by: Robert Wilson
- Succeeded by: Harold Taylor

Personal details
- Born: November 1942 (age 83) Roland, Manitoba
- Party: NDP
- Education: University of Manitoba
- Occupation: Teacher

Myrna A. Phillips (born November 1942) is a politician in Manitoba, Canada. She was a member of the Legislative Assembly of Manitoba from 1981 to 1988, and served as speaker of the assembly from 1986 to 1988.

Phillips was born in Roland, Manitoba. Before entering politics, she was active in feminist organizations such as the Equal Rights and Opportunities Commission, and in community programs such as Place for Kids Daycare. She was also a member of the Wolseley Residents's Association in central Winnipeg. Phillips worked for the provincial government from 1974 to 1981, also working for Great West Life and the Manitoba Telephone System.

She was first elected to the Manitoba legislature in the 1981 provincial election, defeating incumbent Progressive Conservative Len Domino by 1,468 votes in the Wolseley constituency. The NDP won a majority government in this election, and Phillips served in the assembly as a backbench supporter of Howard Pawley's administration. She was easily re-elected in the 1986 election.

On May 8, 1986, Pawley appointed Phillips as speaker of the legislature. The previous speaker, Jim Walding, had become unpopular with his own party in 1984, when he allowed the opposition Progressive Conservatives to delay passage of a bill entrenching French language rights in Manitoba. The PCs boycotted house proceedings for several weeks, and Walding refused to call the house to order for a vote. Many questioned the validity of his actions. The Progressive Conservatives supported Walding, and refused to co-nominate Phillips as his successor.

Phillips generally avoided the controversies of her predecessor, although she was once criticized for attending an NDP caucus meeting during her tenure as speaker.

The NDP were unexpectedly defeated in the legislature in early 1988, when Jim Walding voted against his party's budget in an evenly divided house. A new election was held, which the NDP lost. Phillips was personally defeated in Wolseley, losing to Manitoba Liberal Party candidate Harold Taylor by 506 votes.

After leaving politics, Phillips worked with the National Democratic Institute in Palestine. She also returned to work in the provincial civil service, retiring in 2001. She endorsed Kristine Barr for the Wolseley NDP nomination in the 2003 provincial election.

In August 2012, Phillips was named to the Manitoba Law Reform Commission.
