= Felix Chenier =

Canadian politician (1843–1910)

Felix Chenier (January 19, 1843 – November 20, 1910) was a lawyer and political figure in Manitoba. He represented Baie St. Paul from 1875 to 1878 in the Legislative Assembly of Manitoba.

He was born in Saint-Hermas, Canada East, the son of Felix Chenier and Sophie Legault dite Des Laurier, went on to study law and practised as a notary in Lachute. Chenier came to the Red River Colony with the Wolseley Expedition in 1870. In 1871, he was called to the Manitoba bar and was also named registrar of deeds for Marquette County. In the same year, Chenier married Marie Sarah Levina Poitras, also from Quebec. He was named registrar of titles for the Winnipeg Land Titles Office in 1885.
