= Edward Connery =

Canadian politician

Edward James Connery
- Born: July 13, 1933; St. Vital, Manitoba
- Died: June 14, 2019 (aged 85); Winnipeg, Manitoba
- Occupation: Politician

Edward James Connery (July 13, 1933 in St. Vital, Manitoba – June 14, 2019) was a politician in Manitoba, Canada. He was a member of the Legislative Assembly of Manitoba from 1986 to 1992, and a cabinet minister in the Progressive Conservative government of Gary Filmon from 1988 to 1991.

Connery was educated at Glenlawn Collegiate in St. Vital, Manitoba, and later worked as a market gardener. He was chair of the Root Crop Marketing Board from 1972 to 1981, and vice-president of the Manitoba Producers Board from 1982 to 1984, as well as having been a director of the Vegetable Growers Association of Manitoba. He married Beverley Sager.

Connery was first elected to the Manitoba legislature in the 1986 provincial election, in the safe Tory seat of Portage la Prairie. The Tories were defeated by the New Democrats under Howard Pawley in this cycle, and Connery became a member of the official opposition.

Connery was re-elected in the 1988 election against a reasonably strong challenge from Liberal Darlene Hamm (he still won by over 1000 votes). The Tories under Gary Filmon formed a minority government after this election, and Connery was appointed Minister of Labour and Minister of the Environment and Workplace Safety and Health on May 9, 1988. He was also responsible for the Workers Compensation Act (except as regards Worker Advisers), the Civil Service Act, the Civil Service Superannuation Act, and the Public Servants Insurance Act. Following a cabinet shuffle on April 21, 1989, he was named Minister of Cooperative, Consumer and Corporate Affairs.

Connery was re-elected in the 1990 election. He was not re-appointed to cabinet in a shuffle on February 5, 1991, and resigned from the legislature on June 23, 1992. In leaving, he complained openly about Filmon's government being controlled by backroom operators.

In 2003, Connery called for greater efforts to combat crime in the Portage la Prairie region.

He was an industry leader in mechanizing the harvesting of carrots, onions and rutabagas, as well as their bulk storage, utilizing air circulation and humidification. He is a strong supporter of agricultural research to solve industry production, storage and marketing problems. His assistance contributed to solving problems related to: surface browning of carrots, neck rot in onions, surface cracking of rutabagas and quality maintenance in broccoli. On July 19, 2007, Connery was inducted into the Manitoba Agricultural Hall of Fame.
