= James Cowan (Manitoba physician) =

Canadian politician (1831–1910)

James Cowan (August 20, 1831 – September 2, 1910) was an Irish-born physician and political figure in Manitoba. He represented High Bluff from 1874 to 1878 and Portage la Prairie from 1879 to 1881 in the Legislative Assembly of Manitoba.

He was born in County Tyrone, the son of Joseph Cowan, and came to Montreal in 1850. Cowan moved to Ontario the following year and taught school there for six years. At the same time, he studied medicine, receiving a degree from Victoria University in Toronto. Cowan then practised medicine in Harriston, Ontario for 11 years. He married Janet Broadfoot in 1868. In 1871, he moved to Portage la Prairie, practising medicine there for two years. Cowan then built a sawmill at Assiniboine. He retired from the practice of medicine in 1894. Cowan died in Portage la Prairie at the age of 79.

His grandson, also named James Cowan, also served in the Manitoba assembly.
