= Brian Corrin =

Canadian politician

Brian Mark Corrin (born July 4, 1945) was a politician in Manitoba, Canada. He was a member of the Legislative Assembly of Manitoba from 1977 to 1986, sitting as a New Democrat.

Corrin was born in Winnipeg, Manitoba. The son of Max Corrin and Celia Nick, Corrin was educated at the University of Manitoba (B.A. 1967, LL.B, 1970) and subsequently practiced as a lawyer with the City of Winnipeg Solicitor's Office and then in private practise. From 1974 to 1977, he served as a New Democratic member of the Winnipeg City Council. During that period he also chaired the provincial Child Welfare Treatment Panel. In 1974, Corrin married Joy Margaret Kathleen Cooper. He later married Lorraine Monaster.

He was first elected to the Manitoba legislature in the provincial election of 1977, defeating Tory candidate Geoff Dixon by over 1,000 votes in the north-end Winnipeg riding of Wellington. The Tories under Sterling Lyon won a majority government in this election, and Corrin sat with the opposition for the next four years as shadow Justice Minister.

When the NDP caucus met in 1979 to choose an interim leader following the resignation of Edward Schreyer, Corrin refused to cast a ballot and criticized the selection process. These actions may have ruined his chances for advancement within the party.

Corrin was easily re-elected in the redistributed riding of Ellice in the provincial election of 1981, as the NDP won a majority government under Howard Pawley. He did not receive a position in cabinet being appointed to be Legislative Assistant to the Ministers of Urban Affairs and Justice instead. In 1982 he was also appointed Legislative Assistant to the Premier.

In 1983, while still serving in the legislature, Corrin challenged incumbent Bill Norrie for election as mayor of Winnipeg. He was defeated, due primarily to public opposition to the Pawley government's plans to re-entrench French language services in provincial law. He was also named Queens Counsel that year. He did not seek re-election to the legislature in 1986. In 1985 he was appointed chair of the provincial task force studying the impact of government regulations on business and continued in that role until 1987.

In 1988, he was named a provincial judge. In 1996, he was found guilty of misconduct by a panel of six judges and suspended for 30 days. In February 2011, Corrin was charged with assault and uttering threats against a family member. He was cleared of the charge in November 2011.
