= Charlotte Oleson =

Canadian politician

Personal details
- Born: Charlotte Louise Kingdon; May 17, 1932; Minnedosa, Manitoba
- Died: February 19, 2017 (aged 84); Glenboro, Manitoba

Charlotte Louise Oleson (May 17, 1932 – February 19, 2017) was a Canadian politician who was a member of the Legislative Assembly of Manitoba from 1981 to 1990, and a cabinet minister in the Progressive Conservative government of Gary Filmon from 1988 to 1990.

== Career ==
She was born Charlotte Louise Kingdon, the daughter of John Clarence Kingdon and Elsie Wilmot, and was educated at Minnedosa Collegiate, the Manitoba Provincial Normal School and Brandon College. In 1953, she married Stanley Adaljon Oleson. Prior to running for political office, Oleson raised three children and worked as librarian for the town of Glenboro and later for Glenboro Collegiate. She was a councillor in the Village of Glenboro from 1977 to 1980, and the Deputy Mayor of the community from 1980 to 1982. She also served as Vice-Chair of the Cypress Planning District from 1980 to 1982, and is a member of the Glenboro and Area Historical Society.

Oleson was first elected to the Manitoba legislature in the provincial election of 1981, winning victory in the rural riding of Gladstone. She was re-elected in the 1986 election, despite a credible showing from a candidate of the upstart Confederation of Regions Party. The Manitoba New Democratic Party won both of these elections, and Oleson sat in the opposition benches.

She was re-elected again in the provincial election of 1988, as the Progressive Conservatives formed a minority government under the leadership of Gary Filmon. On May 9, 1988, she was named Minister of Community Services and Minister of Employment Services and Economic Security with responsibility for the Status of Women. She resigned from the latter two responsibilities on April 21, 1989, to retire, and did not seek re-election in 1990.

Oleson remained an active member of the Glenboro community, serving as President of the Glenboro Development Corporation, Chair of the Friends of Spruce Wood Park, and the Criddle/Vane Homestead committee until she died on February 19, 2017, at the age of 84 years.
