= Ellice (electoral district) =

Defunct provincial electoral district in Manitoba, Canada

Ellice is a former provincial electoral district of Manitoba, Canada. It was created by redistribution in 1979 and eliminated in 1989.

The riding was located in west-central Winnipeg, in the area of the future Minto and St. James ridings.

== Members of the Legislative Assembly ==
Name	Party	Took office	Left office
Brian Corrin	NDP	1981	1986
Harvey Smith	NDP	1986	1988
Avis Gray	Lib	1988	1990

== Election results ==
1986 Manitoba general election
Party	Candidate	Votes	%	±%
New Democratic	Harvey Smith	3,989	57.67	
Progressive Conservative	Seech Gajadharsingh	1,731	25.03	
Liberal	Ted Alcuitas	929	13.43	
Progressive	Alex Arenson	268	3.87	
Turnout				
New Democratic hold		Swing		
Source: Elections Manitoba

1988 Manitoba general election
Party	Candidate	Votes	%	±%
Liberal	Avis Gray	3,081	42.88	+29.45
New Democratic	Harvey Smith	2,457	34.20	-23.47
Progressive Conservative	Alex Arenson	1,538	21.41	-3.62
Western Independence	Susan Caine	109	1.52	n/a
Turnout		7,224	71.78	
Liberal gain from New Democratic		Swing		+26.46
Source: Elections Manitoba

== See also ==
- List of Manitoba provincial electoral districts
- Canadian provincial electoral districts
