= Wally McKenzie =

Canadian politician

James Wallace McKenzie (June 16, 1914 in Plenty, Saskatchewan – September 11, 1999) was a politician in Manitoba, Canada. He was a Progressive Conservative member of the Legislative Assembly of Manitoba from 1966 to 1986.

McKenzie was the son of homesteaders who had moved to Manitoba from Ontario. In the 1930s, he earned extra money by performing in dance bands. He was educated in Saskatchewan and did not attend university, working as a grain buyer after leaving school. In 1939, McKenzie married Hilda Rose Pritchard. McKenzie served in the Royal Canadian Air Force from 1941 to 1945 and returned to his old job following the conclusion of World War II. When his employer was bought out by Pool elevators, he opened a grocery store in Inglis, Manitoba which he operated for 30 years.

From 1955 to 1963, he was a member of the Inglis town council. He also served as President of the North Central Hockey League in 1965.

He was first elected to the Manitoba legislature in the provincial election of 1966, in the riding of Roblin, defeating New Democrat Joseph Perchaluk by just over 200 votes. He did not serve in the cabinets of Dufferin Roblin or Walter Weir, and sat as a backbench MLA on the government side for the next three years.

In the provincial election of 1969, McKenzie narrowly defeated fellow incumbent Michael Kawchuk of the NDP in the redistributed riding of Roblin; Kawchuk's constituency, Ethelbert Plains, had been abolished. The NDP under Edward Schreyer formed government after this election, and McKenzie moved to the opposition benches. He was re-elected by an increased margin in the 1973 election, with the lack of a Liberal challenger making his re-election bid easier.

The Progressive Conservatives returned to power under Sterling Lyon in the 1977 election. McKenzie, easily re-elected in his own riding, was named Deputy Speaker of the assembly on November 24, 1977. He did not serve in Lyon's cabinet.

Amid the NDP replacing the Tories as the government and Howard Pawley replacing Lyon as Premier of Manitoba, McKenzie was re-elected again for the new riding of Roblin-Russell in 1981. He retired from politics at the 1986 Manitoba general election.

He died in Russell at the age of 85.
