= Roblin-Russell =

Defunct provincial electoral district in Manitoba, Canada

Roblin-Russell is a former provincial electoral division in the Canadian province of Manitoba. It was created by redistribution in 1979 (with considerable territory from the former riding of Roblin), and was abolished in 1999.

Roblin-Russell was located in southwestern Manitoba. It bordered Arthur-Virden to the south, Minnedosa and Dauphin to the east, Swan River to the north, and the province of Saskatchewan to the west. Roblin and Russell were the two largest communities in the riding, which also contained much rural territory.

The riding was initially a Progressive Conservative/NDP marginal, but was generally safe for the Tories in the 1990s. When it was abolished, its territory was divided into the new ridings of Russell and Dauphin-Roblin.

== Members of the Legislative Assembly ==
Name	Party	Took office	Left office
Wally McKenzie	PC	1981	1986
Len Derkach	PC	1986	1999

== See also ==
- List of Manitoba provincial electoral districts
- Canadian provincial electoral districts
