= Saul Miller =

Canadian politician

Member of the Legislative Assembly of Manitoba for Seven Oaks
- In office 1966–1981
- Preceded by: Arthur E. Wright
- Succeeded by: Eugene Kostyra

Personal details
- Born: January 20, 1917 Winnipeg, Manitoba, Canada
- Died: September 1, 1993 (aged 76) Winnipeg, Manitoba, Canada
- Party: New Democratic Party of Manitoba
- Profession: businessman

Saul Alecs Miller (January 20, 1917 – September 1, 1993) was a politician in Manitoba, Canada. He was a New Democratic member of the Legislative Assembly of Manitoba from 1966 to 1981, and held a number of high-profile cabinet portfolios in the government of Edward Schreyer.

Miller born in Winnipeg, Manitoba in 1917 and raised in a Jewish family in north-end Winnipeg. He was educated at the Peretz School, St. John's High School and the University of Manitoba. He spent time in the armed services and worked for some years at a collection agency in eastern Canada. He returned to Winnipeg in the 1940s, and worked at The People's Bookstore, the North End bookstore owned by his family. In the early 1950s, Miller started a small business called Acme Metal Products. He was also involved in B'nai Brith and the Royal Canadian Legion.

Miller served as a trustee on the Seven Oaks School Board from 1953 to 1958, as an alderman on the West Kildonan city council from 1959 to 1964, and as Mayor of West Kildonan from 1964 to 1966. He was first elected to the provincial legislature in the 1966 election, winning an easy victory in the north-end Winnipeg riding of Seven Oaks.

Miller had long been a personal friend of fellow MLA Saul Cherniack, and soon established himself as one of Cherniack's closest political allies. In 1968–69, Cherniack and Miller played a significant role in convincing federal Member of Parliament Edward Schreyer to replace Russell Paulley as leader of the provincial NDP. Both would later become among Schreyer's most trusted confidants.

Miller was easily re-elected in the provincial election of 1969, in which Schreyer became Premier of Manitoba and the NDP formed government for the first time. On July 15, 1969, he was named Minister of Youth and Education.

As the former mayor of a suburban community, Miller was one of the few prominent New Democrats in Manitoba to oppose the party's call for a united City of Winnipeg at their 1968 policy convention. He later acquiesced to the plan and assisted Cherniack in public consultations on the subject throughout 1970.

After a cabinet shuffle on September 9, 1971, Miller was named Minister of Colleges and University Affairs. In the same year, he opposed a controversial government initiative to provide provincial funding to denominational schools. This measure was opposed by many on both the government side and the opposition. When the legislation was defeated in a free vote, Miller and Schreyer made arrangements for specific denominational schools to receive provincial money by working in conjunction with the public system.

Miller was re-elected in the 1973 provincial election, although by a narrower margin than previously; local opposition to amalgamation was undoubtedly a factor. On August 29, 1973, he was named Minister of Urban Affairs. Miller served as Minister of Health and Social Development from January 28 to December 23, 1974, but subsequently returned to Urban Affairs. He also served as Minister responsible for the Manitoba Housing and Renewal Corporation from January 28, 1974 to September 22, 1976.

While retaining the Urban Affairs portfolio, Miller was also promoted to the Ministry of Finance on September 22, 1976. In this capacity, he passed legislation allowing for the province to introduce its own treasury banks. This policy was never enacted, however, due in part to Miller's concerns that it would label the NDP government as radically socialist and deplete its popularity.

Miller helped launch pharmacare and student aid, but often said that his greatest satisfaction was “being in the first NDP cabinet in Manitoba.” In 1977, he received the Queen Elizabeth II Silver Jubilee Medal.

The NDP lost government in the provincial election of 1977, and Miller was personally re-elected over Progressive Conservative candidate Carl Zawatsky by only 820 votes. In 1979, he was one of only three MLAs to support Saul Cherniack's campaign for interim party leader after Schreyer's resignation. He did not play a major role in the legislature after this time, and did not seek re-election in 1981. Following his political career, he served as Chairman of the Manitoba Telephone System from 1981 to 1985.

Miller died of cancer at Winnipeg on 1 September 1993. He is commemorated by Saul Miller Drive in Winnipeg. There are papers at the Archives of Manitoba.
