= 1981 Manitoba general election =

← 1977	November 17, 1981	1986 →

57 seats of the Legislative Assembly of Manitoba 29 seats were needed for a majority
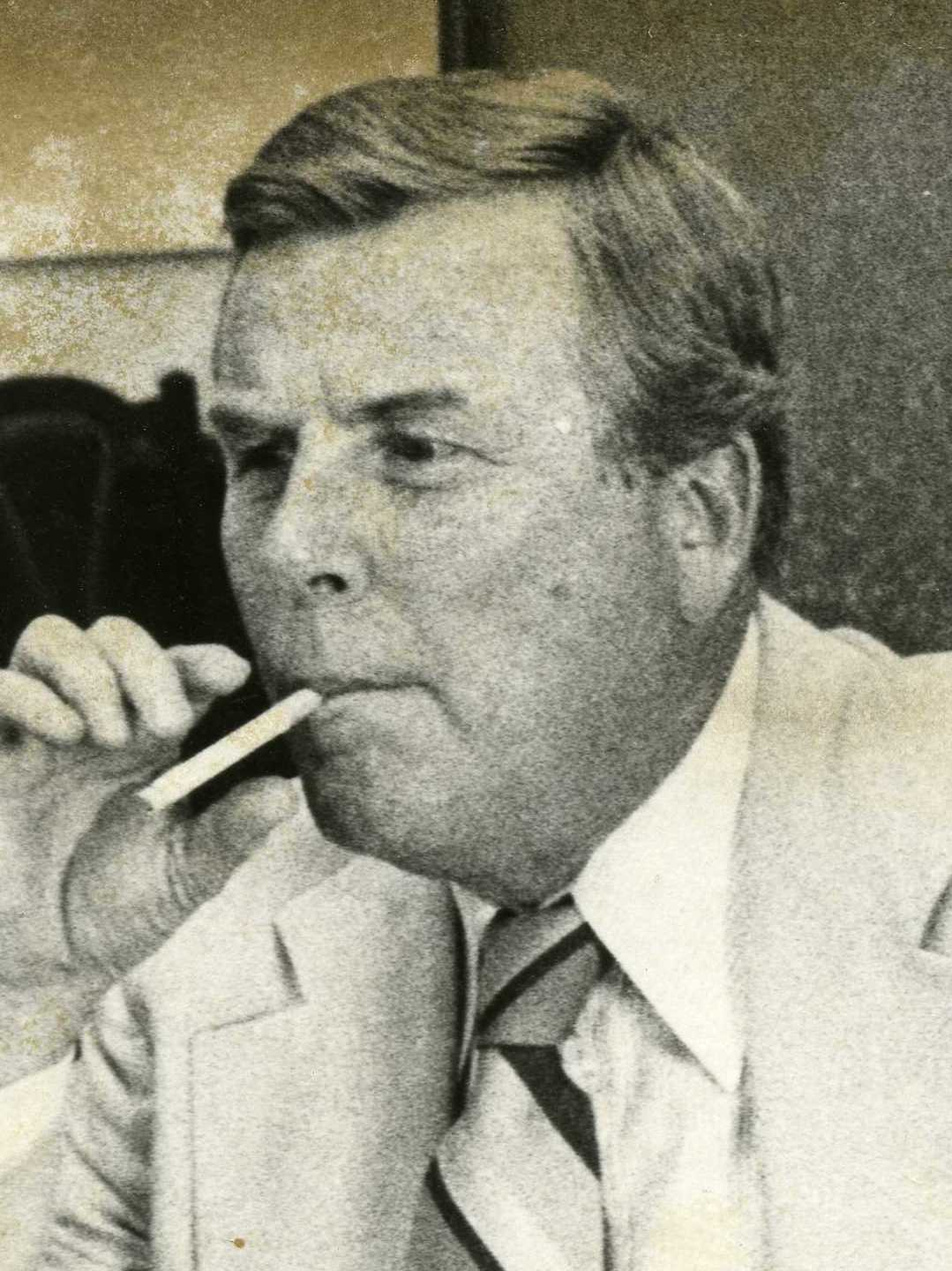
	First party	Second party	Third party
Leader	Howard Pawley	Sterling Lyon	Doug Lauchlan
Party	New Democratic	Progressive Conservative	Liberal
Leader since	November 4, 1979	December 6, 1975	November 30, 1980
Leader's seat	Selkirk	Charleswood	Ran in Wolseley (lost)
Last election	23	33	1
Seats won	34	23	0
Seat change	▲11	▼10	▼1
Popular vote	228,784	211,602	32,373
Percentage	47.38%	43.82%	6.70%
Swing	▲8.76pp	▼4.93pp	▼5.59pp
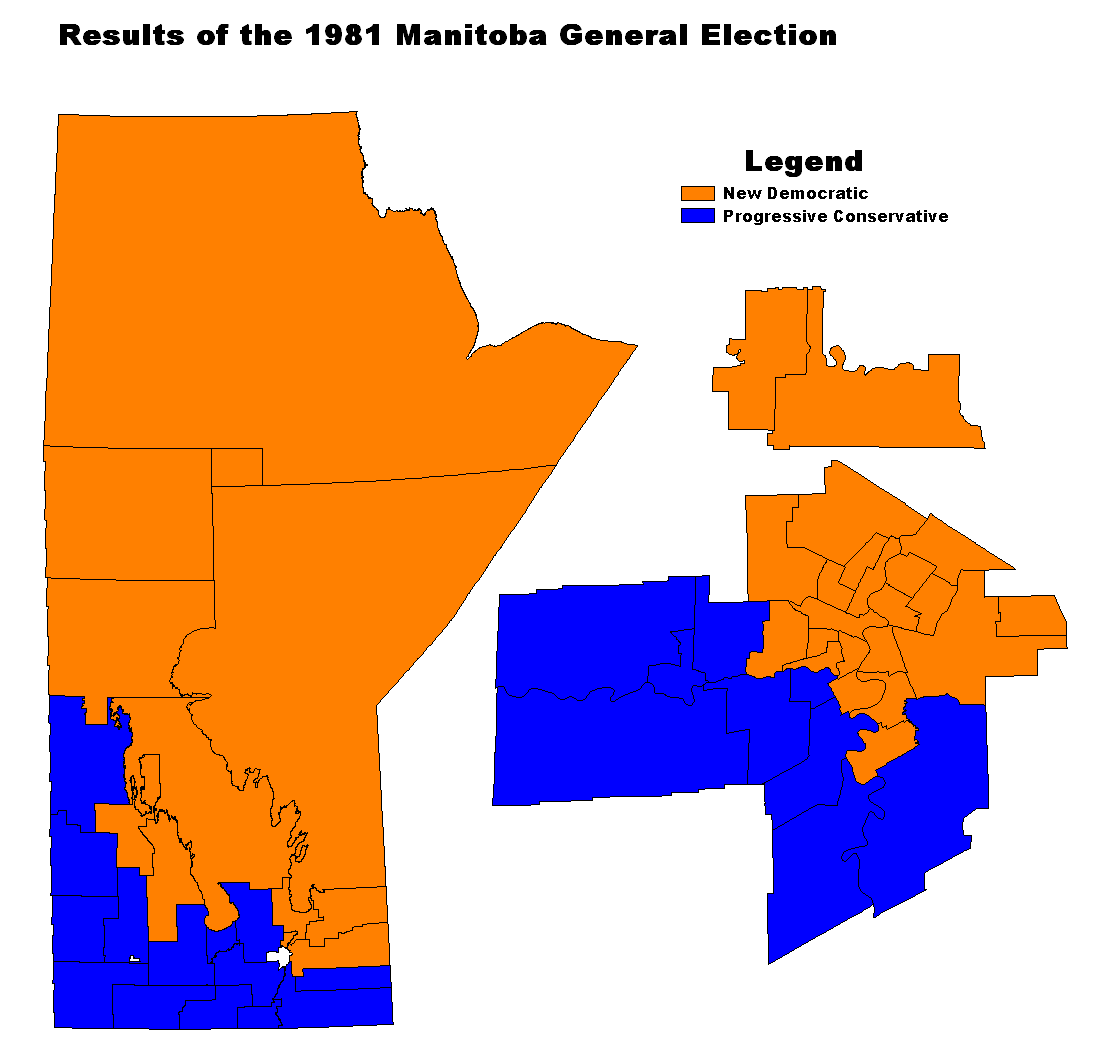
- Map of Election Results
Premier before election
Sterling Lyon
Progressive Conservative
Premier after election
Howard Pawley
New Democratic

The 1981 Manitoba general election was held on November 17, 1981 to elect Members of the Legislative Assembly of the Province of Manitoba, Canada. It was won by the opposition New Democratic Party, which took 34 of 57 seats. The governing Progressive Conservative Party took the remaining 23, while the Manitoba Liberal Party was shut out from the legislature for the only time in its history. The newly formed Progressive Party failed to win any seats.

Sterling Lyon's Progressive Conservative government ran on a promise to continue investing in the province's "mega-projects" (including as a $500 million Alcan aluminum smelter, a $600 million potash mine and a "Western power grid"), and suggested that an NDP government would jeopardize these plans. The NDP campaign, which was largely co-ordinated by Wilson Parasiuk, questioned the Lyon government's fiscal accountability in such matters, noting that it had sold 50% of Trout Lake Copper Mine stock, possibly at a major loss. Jacques Bougie, the Alcan administrator for Manitoba, was also described as holding undue influence over the government.

The NDP campaign generally focused on the economy, and drew attention to the issue of Manitobans emigrating from the province because of job losses. Progressive Party leader Sidney Green described Lyon's initiatives as "bega-projects", a reference to the government's controversial fundraising with foreign corporations.

The election was considered too close to call until the final week, when the NDP campaign gained momentum.

== Results ==
Party	Party Leader	# of candidates	Seats			Popular Vote		
Party	Party Leader	# of candidates	Before^{1}	Elected	% Change	#	%	Change
New Democratic	Howard Pawley	57	20	34	+70.0%	228,784	47.38%	+8.76
Progressive Conservative	Sterling Lyon	57	32	23	-28.1%	211,602	43.82%	-4.93
Liberal	Doug Lauchlan	39	1	-	-100%	32,373	6.70%	-5.59
Progressive	Sidney Green	36	3	-	-100%	8,731	1.81%	+1.81
Communist	Paula Fletcher	2	-	-	-	261	.05%	-0.01
Independent		4	1	-	-100%	1,141	.24%	+0.24
Vacant			1	n.a.				
Total		195	57	57	-	487,154	100%	

^{1} "Before" refers to standings in the Legislature at dissolution, and not to the results of the previous election. These numbers therefore reflect changes in party standings as a result of by-elections and members crossing the floor.

Popular vote
New Democratic	47.38%
PC	43.82%
Liberal	6.70%
Others	2.10%

Seats summary
New Democratic	59.65%
PC	40.35%

== Riding results ==
Party key:

- PC: Progressive Conservative Party of Manitoba
- L: Manitoba Liberal Party
- NDP: New Democratic Party of Manitoba
- P: Progressive Party of Manitoba
- Comm: Communist Party of Canada - Manitoba
- Ind: Independent
- M-L: Marxist-Leninist Party of Canada - Manitoba (see by-elections)
- WCC: Western Canada Concept Party of Manitoba (see by-elections; leader: Fred Cameron)

Note: There was one vacant seat at the time of the election.

(incumbent) denotes incumbent.

Arthur:

- (incumbent)Jim Downey (PC) 5468
- Earl Sterling (NDP) 1772

Assiniboia:

- Ric Nordman (PC) 4006
- Max Melnyk (NDP) 2822
- Peter Moss (L) 817
- Fran Huck (P) 378

Brandon East:

- (incumbent)Len Evans (NDP) 4941
- Gary Nowazek (PC) 2626
- Margaret Workman (L) 512

Brandon West:

- Henry Carroll (NDP) 5069
- John Allen (PC) 4634
- David Campbell (L) 547

Burrows:

- Conrad Santos (NDP) 4890
- Mary Shore (PC) 1384
- (incumbent)Ben Hanuschak (P) 728
- Wayne Anderson (L) 617
- Paula Fletcher (Comm) 144

Charleswood:

- (incumbent)Sterling Lyon (PC) 6334
- Toni Vosters (NDP) 3243
- Ken Brown (L) 969
- Demetre Mastoris (P) 231

Churchill:

- (incumbent)Jay Cowan (NDP) 2247
- Mark Ingebrigtson (PC) 883
- Andrew Kirkness (L) 266
- Doug MacLachlan (P) 85

1981 Manitoba general election: Concordia
Party	Candidate	Votes	%
New Democratic	Peter Fox	5,333	60.91
Progressive Conservative	Scotty McVicar	2,586	29.54
Liberal	Gail Stapon	309	3.53
Progressive	Josephine Young	306	3.50
Independent	Bob Fraser	221	2.52
Total valid votes		8,755	–
Rejected		15	–
Eligible voters / Turnout		12,589	69.54
Source(s) Source: Manitoba. Chief Electoral Officer (1999). Statement of Votes for the 37th Provincial General Election, September 21, 1999 (PDF) (Report). Winnipeg: Elections Manitoba.

Dauphin:

- John Plohman (NDP) 4680
- (incumbent)James Galbraith (PC) 4044
- Bob Hawkins (L) 1049

Ellice:

- (incumbent)Brian Corrin (NDP) 4233
- Gavin Scott (PC) 1712
- Rod Cantiveros (L) 782
- Adam Klym (P) 222
- Bart Monaco (Ind) 56

1981 Manitoba general election: Elmwood
Party	Candidate	Votes	%	±%
New Democratic	Russell Doern	5,140	67.83	16.72
Progressive Conservative	Eveline Holtmann	1,910	25.20	-15.35
Liberal	Eric Wood	347	4.58	-3.76
Progressive	Curtis Bloodworth	181	2.39	–
Total valid votes		7,578	–	–
Rejected		36	–	
Eligible voters / Turnout		11,506	66.17	-6.17
Source(s) Source: Manitoba. Chief Electoral Officer (1999). Statement of Votes for the 37th Provincial General Election, September 21, 1999 (PDF) (Report). Winnipeg: Elections Manitoba.

Emerson:

- (incumbent)Albert Driedger (PC) 4376
- Paul Dupuis (NDP) 4020
- Stephen Zaretski (L) 308
- Jack Thiessen (P) 116

Flin Flon:

- Jerry Storie (NDP) 3557
- Bob McNeil (PC) 2126

Fort Garry:

- (incumbent)Bud Sherman (PC) 6227
- Hans Wittich (NDP) 3705
- Lil Haus (L) 1042
- James Goodridge (P) 203

Fort Rouge:

- Roland Penner (NDP) 4342
- Perry Schulman (PC) 2843
- (incumbent)June Westbury (L) 2415
- (incumbent)Bud Boyce (P) 143

Gimli:

- John Bucklaschuk (NDP) 4825
- (incumbent)Keith Cosens (PC) 3995
- Allan Chambers (L) 276
- Pat Bazan (P) 127

Gladstone:

- Charlotte Oleson (PC) 4447
- Irvin Joel (NDP) 1650
- Abe Suderman (L) 737

Inkster:

- Don Scott (NDP) 6283
- Bill Dueck (PC) 1561
- (incumbent)Sidney Green (P) 783
- Myroslaw Tracz (L) 364

Interlake:

- (incumbent)Bill Uruski (NDP) 4599
- Neil Dueck (PC) 2181
- Bob Lundale (L) 372

Kildonan:

- Mary Beth Dolin (NDP) 6794
- Ken Galanchuk (PC) 4478
- Alex Berkowits (L) 755
- Dan Tokarz (P) 300

Kirkfield Park:

- Gerrie Hammond (PC) 6443
- Lee Monk (NDP) 3551

Lac Du Bonnet:

- (incumbent)Sam Uskiw (NDP) 4682
- Bert Trainer (PC) 2809

Lakeside:

- (incumbent)Harry Enns (PC) 5055
- Larry Moldowan (NDP) 2630
- Bill Ridgeway (L) 592
- Hubert John McCaw (P) 107

La Verendrye:

- (incumbent)Robert Banman (PC) 4418
- Jim Henry (NDP) 1149
- Alphonse Fournier (P) 704

Logan:

- Maureen Hemphill (NDP) 3759
- Stephen Juba (Ind) 700
- Aurele Joseph LeClaire (PC) 659
- Art Potvin (P) 103

Minnedosa:

- (incumbent)David Robert Blake (PC) 4160
- Garry Grant (NDP) 3397

Morris:

- Clayton Manness (PC) 4579
- Peter Francis (NDP) 1821

Niakwa:

- (incumbent)Abe Kovnats (PC) 5432
- Lloyd Schreyer (NDP) 4736
- Doug Biggs (L) 1345

Osborne:

- Muriel Smith (NDP) 5371
- Ben Lindsey (PC) 2726
- Fraser Dunford (L) 1262
- George Buss (P) 165

Pembina:

- (incumbent)Donald Orchard (PC) 6361
- Jeff Taylor (NDP) 862
- Kenneth Popkes (L) 696
- John Brooks (P) 274

Portage la Prairie:

- (incumbent)Lloyd Hyde (PC) 3620
- Audrey Tufford (NDP) 2413
- Hugh Moran (L) 1601

Radisson:

- Gerard Lecuyer (NDP) 6108
- George Provost (PC) 2566
- Joel Morasutti (P) 376

Rhineland:

- (incumbent)Arnold Brown (PC) 4116
- Ralph EisBrenner (NDP) 1181
- Jacob Froese (P) 349

Riel:

- Doreen Dodick (NDP) 4362
- (incumbent)Don Craik (PC) 4120
- John Karasevich (L) 1087
- Dino Kotis (P) 98

River East:

- Phil Eyler (NDP) 5949
- Harold Piercy (PC) 5903
- Shirley Wolechuk (L) 259
- Lindsay Ulrich (P) 177

River Heights:

- (incumbent)Warren Steen (PC) 4905
- David Sanders (NDP) 3217
- Jay Prober (L) 2526
- Janet Lundman (P) 142

Roblin-Russell:

- (incumbent)Wally McKenzie (PC) 4508
- Zen Wonitoway (NDP) 3673

Rossmere:

- (incumbent)Vic Schroeder (NDP) 5776
- Ian Sutherland (PC) 4293
- William De Jong (L) 389
- Merv Unger (P) 142

Rupertsland:

- Elijah Harper (NDP) 3032
- Alan Ross (L) 1004
- Nelson Scribe, Sr. (PC) 272
- Frances Thompson (P) 56

St. Boniface:

- (incumbent)Laurent Desjardins (NDP) 5844
- Guy Savoie (L) 1925
- Wes Rowson (PC) 1346
- Don Forsyth (P) 106

St. James:

- Al Mackling (NDP) 5376
- (incumbent)George Minaker (PC) 4597
- Harvey Nerbas (P) 180

1981 Manitoba general election: St. Johns
Party	Candidate	Votes	%
New Democratic	Donald Malinowski	4,004	56.99
Progressive Conservative	Don Cilinsky	1,785	25.41
Liberal	Henry Kowlowski	674	9.59
Progressive	Bernie Bellan	446	6.35
Communist	William Cecil Ross	117	1.67
Total valid votes		7,026	
Rejected ballots		70	
Turnout		7,096	67.18
Electors on the lists		10,562	

St. Norbert:

- (incumbent)Gerry Mercier (PC) 5728
- Ruth Pear (NDP) 3826
- Grant Temple (L) 857
- Allan Yap (P) 216

1981 Manitoba general election: St. Vital
Party	Candidate	Votes	%	±%
New Democratic	Jim Walding	5,504	52.80	+11.18
Progressive Conservative	John Robertson	4,236	40.64	+4.69
Liberal	Gord Patterson	684	6.56	-15.87
Total valid votes		10,424	100.00	
Rejected votes		34		
Turnout		10,458	80.61	
Electors on the lists		12,974		
New Democratic hold		Swing		+3.24

Ste. Rose:

- (incumbent)A.R. Pete Adam (NDP) 4031
- Ivan Traill (PC) 3823
- Valerie Wilson (P) 194

Selkirk:

- (incumbent)Howard Pawley (NDP) 5626
- Eugene Kinaschuk (PC) 3020
- Max Hofford (P) 131

Seven Oaks:

- Eugene Kostyra (NDP) 6127
- Al Christie (PC) 2179
- Wayne Glowacki (L) 486
- Morely Golden (P) 367

Springfield:

- Andy Anstett (NDP) 5303
- (incumbent)Bob Anderson (PC) 4833
- Peter Anderson (L) 327
- Dennis Sweatman (P) 113

Sturgeon Creek:

- (incumbent)Frank Johnston (PC) 5546
- Robert Adams (NDP) 3253
- John Epp (L) 732

Swan River:

- (incumbent)Doug Gourlay (PC) 3884
- Leonard Harapiak (NDP) 3615
- George Simpson (P) 138

The Pas:

- Harry Harapiak (NDP) 4236
- Percy Pielak (PC) 1303
- Laverne Jaeb (L) 509

Thompson:

- Steve Ashton (NDP) 2890
- (incumbent)Ken MacMaster (PC) 2818
- Cy Hennessey (L) 138

Transcona:

- (incumbent)Wilson Parasiuk (NDP) 6013
- Jo Lopuck (PC) 2269
- Albert Smaczylo (P) 120

1981 Manitoba general election: Turtle Mountain
Party	Candidate	Votes	%	±%
Progressive Conservative	Brian Ransom	4,775	72.36	29.99
New Democratic	Joan Johannson	1,660	25.16	–
Independent	Bill Harrison	164	2.49	–
Total valid votes		6,599	–	–
Rejected		33	–	
Eligible voters / Turnout		10,533	62.96	–
Source(s) Source: Manitoba. Chief Electoral Officer (1999). Statement of Votes for the 37th Provincial General Election, September 21, 1999 (PDF) (Report). Winnipeg: Elections Manitoba.

Tuxedo:

- (incumbent)Gary Filmon (PC) 6731
- Terri Gray (NDP) 2433
- Beverly McCaffrey (L) 1257

Virden:

- (incumbent)Harry Graham (PC) 5059
- Maude Lelong (NDP) 2859

Wolseley:

- Myrna Phillips (NDP) 4370
- (incumbent)Len Domino (PC) 2904
- Doug Lauchlan (L) 1539
- Murdoch MacKay (P) 224

=== Post-election changes ===
Henry Carroll (NDP) became (Ind), August 19, 1982. Russell Doern (NDP) became (Ind), March 7, 1984.

Fort Garry (res. Louis Sherman, August 5, 1984), October 2, 1984:

- Charles Birt (PC) 3561
- Sharon Carstairs (L) 1993
- Shirley Lord (NDP) 1211
- Sidney Green (P) 1035
- Fred Cameron (WCC) 186

Kildonan (dec. Mary Beth Dolin, April 10, 1985), October 1, 1985:

- Martin Dolin (NDP) 4332
- Bev Rayburn (PC) 3248
- Chris Guly (L) 988
- Ben Hanuschak (P) 546

Portage la Prairie (dec. Lloyd Hyde, August 25, 1985)

== See also ==
- List of Manitoba political parties
