= Brandon West =

Provincial electoral district in Manitoba, Canada

Coordinates: 49.844°N 99.978°W

Manitoba electoral district
- Location in Brandon

Provincial electoral district
- Legislature: Legislative Assembly of Manitoba
MLA
Wayne Balcaen
Progressive Conservative
- District created: 1968
- First contested: 1969
- Last contested: 2023

Demographics
- Population (2016): 21,175
- Electors (2019): 14,522
- Area (km²): 13
- Pop. density (per km²): 1,628.8
- Census subdivision: Brandon

Brandon West (French: Brandon-Ouest) is a provincial electoral district of Manitoba, Canada. It encompasses the southwestern part of the city of Brandon.

== History of the riding ==
The original riding of Brandon West existed from 1886 to 1888, after the city and riding of Brandon City was divided into two electoral divisions. It was eliminated in 1888, when the city became a single division again.

The modern riding of Brandon West was created in 1968, when the city of Brandon was again divided into two electoral districts. It was formally brought into being in the provincial election of 1969.

The riding is surrounded by Brandon East to the east and by Spruce Woods in all other directions. The city of Brandon itself is located in the southwestern region of the province.

The riding's population in 1996 was 19,808. In 1999, the average family income was $56,860, and the unemployment rate was 6.30%. The service sector accounts for 16% of industry in the riding, followed by health and social services at 15%.

Brandon West includes the more affluent section of Brandon, and has usually elected Progressive Conservative members. It was sometimes said that Brandon West voters elected Tories and Brandon East voters elected New Democrats to ensure that the city would have a member on the government side regardless of the provincial outcome.

Scott Smith of the New Democratic Party won the seat in 1999, and retained it with over 60% of the vote in 2003. He lost the seat in 2007 to Progressive Conservative candidate Rick Borotsik by just 56 votes.

In the 2018 redistribution, the part of the riding north of the Assiniboine River was moved to Spruce Woods.

== Members of the Legislative Assembly ==
Assembly	Years	Member	Party
Riding created from Brandon City
6th	1886-1888	John Kirchhoffer	Conservative
Riding dissolved into Brandon City
Riding recreated from Brandon and Souris-Lansdowne
28th	1966-1969	Edward McGill	Progressive Conservative
29th	1969-1972	Edward McGill	Progressive Conservative
30th	1973-1977	Edward McGill	Progressive Conservative
31st	1977-1981	Edward McGill	Progressive Conservative
32nd	1981-1982	Henry Carroll	New Democratic
32nd	1982-1985	Henry Carroll	Independent
33rd	1985-1988	James McCrae	Progressive Conservative
34th	1988-1990	James McCrae	Progressive Conservative
35th	1990-1992	James McCrae	Progressive Conservative
36th	1995-1999	James McCrae	Progressive Conservative
37th	1999-2003	Scott Smith	New Democratic
38th	2003-2007	Scott Smith	New Democratic
39th	2007-2011	Rick Borotsik	Progressive Conservative
40th	2011-2016	Reg Helwer	Progressive Conservative
41st	2016–2019	Reg Helwer	Progressive Conservative
42nd	2019–2023	Reg Helwer	Progressive Conservative
43rd	2023–Present	Wayne Balcaen	Progressive Conservative

== Election results ==
=== 2023 ===
2023 Manitoba general election
Party	Candidate	Votes	%	±%	Expenditures
Progressive Conservative	Wayne Balcaen	3,814	48.75	-9.64	$34,464.23
New Democratic	Quentin Robinson	3,725	47.62	+23.82	$6,200.25
Green	Bill Marsh	284	3.63	-6.50	$0.00
Total valid votes/expense limit		7,823	99.38	–	$60,088.00
Total rejected and declined ballots		49	0.62	–	
Turnout		7,872	51.68	+0.41	
Eligible voters		15,232			
Progressive Conservative hold		Swing		-16.73	
Source(s) Source: Elections Manitoba

=== 2019 ===
2019 Manitoba general election
Party	Candidate	Votes	%	±%	Expenditures
Progressive Conservative	Reg Helwer	4,311	58.39	-9.8	$20,202.15
New Democratic	Nick Brown	1,757	23.80	-0.4	$1,132.68
Green	Robert Brown	748	10.13	–	$33.24
Liberal	Sunday Frangi	567	7.68	-0.0	$541.53
Total valid votes		7,383	99.15	–	
Rejected		63	0.65		
Turnout		7,446	51.27		
Eligible voters		14,522			
Progressive Conservative hold		Swing		-4.7	
Source(s) Source: Manitoba. Chief Electoral Officer (2019). Statement of Votes for the 42nd Provincial General Election, September 10, 2019 (PDF) (Report). Winnipeg: Elections Manitoba. "Candidate Election Returns". Elections Manitoba. Elections Manitoba.

=== 2016 ===
2016 provincial election redistributed results
Party	%
Progressive Conservative	68.2
New Democratic	24.2
Liberal	7.7

2016 Manitoba general election
Party	Candidate	Votes	%	±%	Expenditures
Progressive Conservative	Reg Helwer	5,624	69.10	20.42	$33,113.21
New Democratic	Linda Ross	1,884	23.15	-23.79	$13,539.46
Liberal	Billy Moore	631	7.75	3.37	$1,314.33
Total valid votes		8,139	–	–	
Rejected		202	–		
Eligible voters / turnout		14,914	55.93	-3.86	
Source(s) Source: Manitoba. Chief Electoral Officer (2016). Statement of Votes for the 41st Provincial General Election, April 19, 2016 (PDF) (Report). Winnipeg: Elections Manitoba. "Election Returns: 41st General Election". Elections Manitoba. 2016.

=== 2011 ===
2011 Manitoba general election
Party	Candidate	Votes	%	±%	Expenditures
Progressive Conservative	Reg Helwer	4,231	48.68	0.63	$29,570.60
New Democratic	Jim Murray	4,080	46.94	-0.54	$24,888.84
Liberal	George Buri	381	4.38	0.34	$7,641.08
Total valid votes		8,692	–	–	
Rejected		41	–		
Eligible voters / turnout		14,607	59.79	-7.02	
Source(s) Source: Manitoba. Chief Electoral Officer (2011). Statement of Votes for the 40th Provincial General Election, October 4, 2011 (PDF) (Report). Winnipeg: Elections Manitoba. "Election Returns: 40th General Election". Elections Manitoba. 2011.

=== 2007 ===
2007 Manitoba general election
Party	Candidate	Votes	%	±%	Expenditures
Progressive Conservative	Rick Borotsik	4,730	48.04	13.12	$29,059.52
New Democratic	Scott Smith	4,674	47.48	-13.55	$27,506.06
Liberal	M. J. Willard	398	4.04	-0.01	$6,098.53
Communist	Lisa Gallagher	43	0.44	–	
Total valid votes		9,845	–	–	
Rejected		39	–		
Eligible voters / turnout		14,796	66.80	6.37	
Source(s) Source: Manitoba. Chief Electoral Officer (2007). Statement of Votes for the 39th Provincial General Election, May 22, 2007 (PDF) (Report). Winnipeg: Elections Manitoba.

=== 2003 ===
2003 Manitoba general election
Party	Candidate	Votes	%	±%	Expenditures
New Democratic	Scott Smith	5,210	61.02	11.76	$20,721.62
Progressive Conservative	Reg Atkinson	2,982	34.93	-10.79	$15,828.88
Liberal	Candace Sigurdson	346	4.05	-0.04	$2,086.52
Total valid votes		8,538	–	–	
Rejected		28	–		
Eligible voters / turnout		14,174	60.43	-12.70	
Source(s) Source: Manitoba. Chief Electoral Officer (2003). Statement of Votes for the 38th Provincial General Election, June 3, 2003 (PDF) (Report). Winnipeg: Elections Manitoba.

=== 1999 ===
1999 Manitoba general election
Party	Candidate	Votes	%	±%	Expenditures
New Democratic	Scott Smith	4,898	49.26	18.43	$17,671.00
Progressive Conservative	James McCrae	4,546	45.72	-3.68	$29,994.07
Liberal	Lisa Roy	407	4.09	-15.67	$600.00
Communist	Lisa Gallagher	92	0.93	–	$0.00
Total valid votes		9,943	–	–	
Rejected		75	–		
Eligible voters / turnout		13,698	73.13	5.39	
Source(s) Source: Manitoba. Chief Electoral Officer (1999). Statement of Votes for the 37th Provincial General Election, September 21, 1999 (PDF) (Report). Winnipeg: Elections Manitoba.

=== 1995 ===
1995 Manitoba general election
Party	Candidate	Votes	%	±%
Progressive Conservative	James McCrae	4,471	49.40	-6.07
New Democratic	Derry Decter	2,790	30.83	3.02
Liberal	Mark Barber	1,789	19.77	3.04
Total valid votes		9,050	–	–
Rejected		33	–	
Eligible voters / turnout		13,407	67.75	-1.94
Source(s) Source: Manitoba. Chief Electoral Officer (1999). Statement of Votes for the 37th Provincial General Election, September 21, 1999 (PDF) (Report). Winnipeg: Elections Manitoba.

=== 1990 ===
1990 Manitoba general election
Party	Candidate	Votes	%	±%
Progressive Conservative	James McCrae	4,736	55.47	9.54
New Democratic	Shari Decter-Hirst	2,374	27.81	6.72
Liberal	Abby Hampton	1,428	16.73	-16.26
Total valid votes		8,538	–	–
Rejected		27	–	
Eligible voters / Turnout		12,290	69.69	-2.85
Source(s) Source: Manitoba. Chief Electoral Officer (1999). Statement of Votes for the 37th Provincial General Election, September 21, 1999 (PDF) (Report). Winnipeg: Elections Manitoba.

=== 1988 ===
1988 Manitoba general election
Party	Candidate	Votes	%	±%
Progressive Conservative	James McCrae	5,039	45.93	-7.18
Liberal	John Worley	3,618	32.98	25.69
New Democratic	Ishbel Solvason	2,313	21.08	-18.51
Total valid votes		10,970	–	–
Rejected		20	–	
Eligible voters / Turnout		15,151	72.54	1.61
Source(s) Source: Manitoba. Chief Electoral Officer (1999). Statement of Votes for the 37th Provincial General Election, September 21, 1999 (PDF) (Report). Winnipeg: Elections Manitoba.

=== 1986 ===
1986 Manitoba general election
Party	Candidate	Votes	%	±%
Progressive Conservative	James McCrae	5,537	53.11	7.90
New Democratic	Arnold G. Grambo	4,128	39.60	-9.86
Liberal	Kerry Auriat	760	7.29	1.95
Total valid votes		10,425	–	–
Rejected		24	–	
Eligible voters / Turnout		14,733	70.92	-7.84
Source(s) Source: Manitoba. Chief Electoral Officer (1999). Statement of Votes for the 37th Provincial General Election, September 21, 1999 (PDF) (Report). Winnipeg: Elections Manitoba.

=== 1981 ===
1981 Manitoba general election
Party	Candidate	Votes	%	±%
New Democratic	Henry Nelson Carroll	5,069	49.45	8.35
Progressive Conservative	John Allen	4,634	45.21	-5.53
Liberal	David Campbell	547	5.34	-1.87
Total valid votes		10,250	–	–
Rejected		17	–	
Eligible voters / Turnout		13,035	78.76	5.01
Source(s) Source: Manitoba. Chief Electoral Officer (1999). Statement of Votes for the 37th Provincial General Election, September 21, 1999 (PDF) (Report). Winnipeg: Elections Manitoba.

=== 1977 ===
1977 Manitoba general election
Party	Candidate	Votes	%	±%
Progressive Conservative	Edward McGill	5,680	50.74	-0.45
New Democratic	Henry Nelson Carroll	4,601	41.10	+0.43
Liberal	Phil Cels	807	7.21	-0.93
Social Credit	John William Gross	107	0.96	–
Total valid votes		11,195	99.87	–
Rejected		15	0.13	-0.25
Turnout		11,210	73.75	-3.99
Eligible voters		15,200		
Progressive Conservative hold		Swing		-0.44
Source(s) Source: Manitoba. Chief Electoral Officer (1999). Statement of Votes for the 37th Provincial General Election, September 21, 1999 (PDF) (Report). Winnipeg: Elections Manitoba.

=== 1973 ===
1973 Manitoba general election
Party	Candidate	Votes	%	±%
Progressive Conservative	Edward McGill	5,070	51.19	+10.53
New Democratic	Henry Nelson Carroll	4,028	40.67	+7.29
Liberal	Guy Savoie	806	8.14	-17.82
Total valid votes		9,904	99.62	–
Rejected		38	0.38	+0.18
Turnout		9,942	77.74	+11.56
Eligible voters		12,789		
Progressive Conservative hold		Swing		+1.62
Source(s) Source: Manitoba. Chief Electoral Officer (1999). Statement of Votes for the 37th Provincial General Election, September 21, 1999 (PDF) (Report). Winnipeg: Elections Manitoba.

=== 1969 ===
1969 Manitoba general election
Party	Candidate	Votes	%
Progressive Conservative	Edward McGill	2,814	40.66
New Democratic	James M. Skinner	2,310	33.38
Liberal	Terence "Terry" Penton	1,796	25.95
Total valid votes		6,920	99.80
Rejected		14	0.20
Turnout		6,934	66.18
Eligible voters		10,477	
Source(s) Source: Manitoba. Chief Electoral Officer (1999). Statement of Votes for the 37th Provincial General Election, September 21, 1999 (PDF) (Report). Winnipeg: Elections Manitoba.

=== 1886 ===
1886 Manitoba general election
Party	Candidate	Votes	%
Conservative	John Nesbitt Kirchhoffer	441	50.81
Liberal	John Wright Sifton	427	49.19
Total valid votes		868	–
Rejected		N/A	–
Eligible voters / Turnout		1,455	59.66
Source(s) Source: Manitoba. Chief Electoral Officer (1999). Statement of Votes for the 37th Provincial General Election, September 21, 1999 (PDF) (Report). Winnipeg: Elections Manitoba.

== See also ==
- List of Manitoba provincial electoral districts
- Canadian provincial electoral districts
