= Minenko =

Minenko or Mynenko (Ukrainian: Міненко) is a gender-neutral Ukrainian surname. Notable people with the surname include:

- Hanna Knyazyeva-Minenko (born 1989), Israeli triple jumper and long jumper
- Mark Minenko (born 1957), Canadian politician
