= Frances Gertrude McGill =

Canadian forensic pathologist and allergologist (1882–1959)

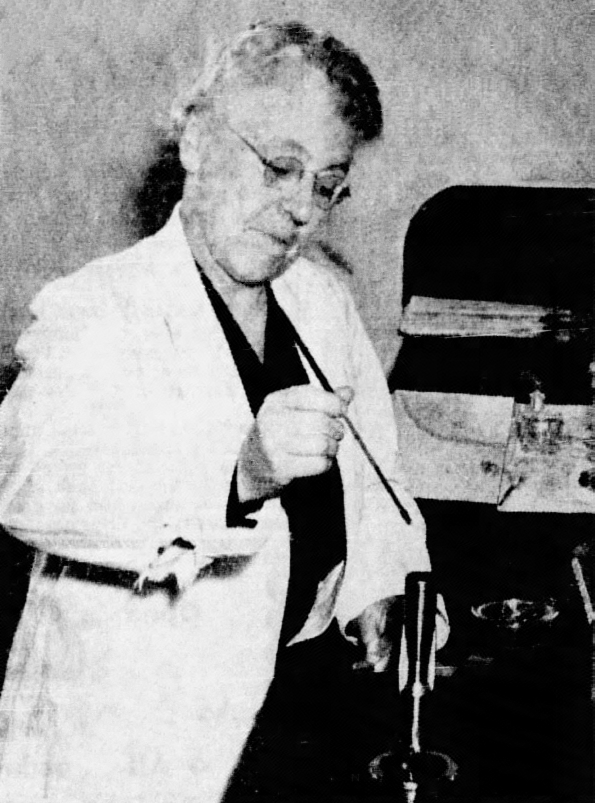
- McGill in her laboratory, 1942
- Born: November 18, 1882; Minnedosa, Manitoba, Canada
- Died: January 21, 1959 (aged 76); Winnipeg, Manitoba, Canada
- Education: University of Manitoba
- Occupations: Forensic pathologist; criminologist; bacteriologist; allergologist; allergist
- Known for: Pioneering the use of forensic pathology in Canadian police work
- Relatives: Harold McGill (brother); Edward McGill (nephew)

Frances Gertrude McGill (November 18, 1882 – January 21, 1959) was a Canadian forensic pathologist, criminologist, bacteriologist, allergologist and allergist. Nicknamed "the Sherlock Holmes of Saskatchewan" for her deductive skills and public fame, McGill influenced the development of forensic pathology in Canadian police work and was internationally noted for her expertise in the subject.

After completing her medical degree at the University of Manitoba in 1915, McGill moved to Saskatchewan, where she was hired first as the provincial bacteriologist and then as the provincial pathologist. She worked extensively with the Royal Canadian Mounted Police (RCMP) and local police forces for more than thirty years, and was instrumental in establishing the first RCMP forensic laboratory. She directed the RCMP laboratory for three years, and trained new RCMP recruits in forensic detection methods. After retiring in 1946, McGill was appointed Honorary Surgeon for the RCMP by the Canadian Minister of Justice, becoming one of the first official female members of the force, and she continued to act as a consultant to the RCMP until her death in 1959.

Alongside her pathological work, McGill operated a private medical practice for the diagnosis and treatment of allergies. She was acknowledged as a specialist in allergy testing, and doctors across Saskatchewan referred patients to her care.

McGill is a member of the Canadian Science and Engineering Hall of Fame. After her death, McGill Lake in northern Saskatchewan was named in her honour.

== Early life and education ==
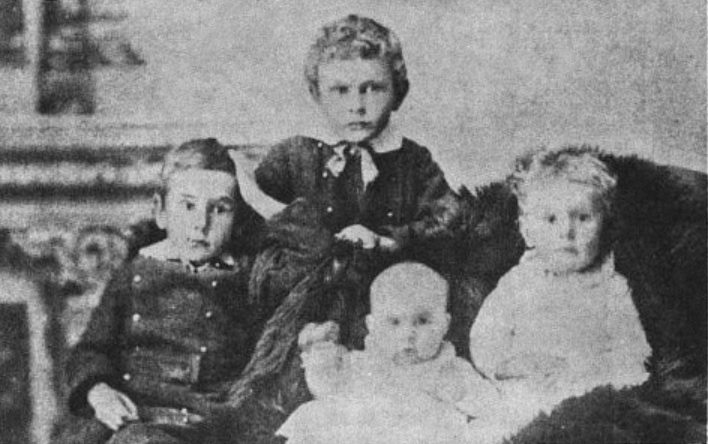
Portrait of the McGill children in 1885. From left to right: Harold, Herbert, Margaret (baby) and Frances.

Frances Gertrude McGill was born on November 18, 1882, (Note: Although some sources give McGill's birth year as 1877, the 1882 date is further supported by McGill's birth record (freely available for viewing online via the Manitoba Vital Statistics Agency). In addition, McGill's older brother Harold was born in 1879, which makes the 1877 birthdate for Frances McGill illogical.) in Minnedosa, Manitoba. Her parents were Edward McGill, whose family had emigrated from Ireland to Canada in 1819, and Henrietta Wigmore, also of Irish descent. Henrietta was a former school teacher, and had once circumnavigated the globe, travelling to New Zealand for a teaching job and later returning to Canada. Edward was active in local politics and agricultural societies, and worked as the postmaster in Minnedosa. Frances McGill had two older brothers, Herbert and Harold, and one younger sister named Margaret. Harold eventually became a doctor, serving as a medical officer during the First World War, while Margaret became a nurse and joined the Canadian Army Medical Corps. In mid-1900, when McGill was seventeen, her parents became ill with typhoid fever after drinking contaminated water at a county fair. Both died in September within ten days of each other. McGill's eldest brother, Herbert, took over the running of the family farm until his younger siblings had completed their basic schooling.

McGill trained as a teacher at the Winnipeg Normal School and taught summer school to fund her further education. She originally considered becoming a lawyer, but decided to study medicine instead. She paid for much of her schooling through scholarships. In 1915, McGill completed her medical degree at the University of Manitoba, receiving the Hutchison Gold Medal for highest academic standing, the Dean's Prize and an award for surgical knowledge. She was one of the first female medical students to graduate from the university. McGill served her internship at the Winnipeg General Hospital. She subsequently attended the provincial laboratory of Manitoba for post-graduate studies and completed training in pathology.

== Career ==
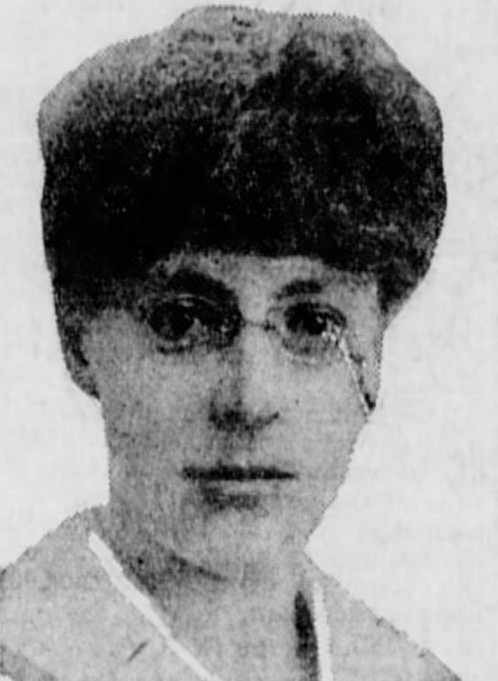
Frances McGill in 1917

=== Bacteriologist ===
Developing a growing expertise in bacteriology, McGill was named provincial bacteriologist for the Saskatchewan Department of Health in 1918. She moved to Regina for the job, where her new office and lab were located in the Saskatchewan Legislative building. By October of that year, she was responsible for handling local outbreaks of the 1918 flu epidemic. McGill and her colleagues quickly produced flu vaccinations for more than 60,000 Saskatchewan residents. McGill also treated returning First World War soldiers for venereal disease.

=== Pathologist ===
In 1920, McGill became provincial pathologist for Saskatchewan, and by 1922 she had become director of the provincial laboratory. McGill now dealt with cases of suspicious death, working extensively with local police forces and the Royal Canadian Mounted Police (RCMP). Her investigations required frequent travel – up to forty-three trips in a single year – and McGill sometimes used a snowmobile, dog sled or float plane to reach crime scenes, once travelling to the Arctic Circle.

Earning the unofficial nickname "the Sherlock Holmes of Saskatchewan", McGill gained a professional reputation as a skilled and meticulous criminologist, and was fondly called "Doc" by members of the police force. Her personal motto was reportedly "Think like a man, act like a lady and work like a dog." She was known for handling the sometimes gruesome nature of her work by maintaining a good sense of humour, and was a formidable, no-nonsense witness in court cases. During her court testimonies, McGill sometimes encountered young Saskatchewan defense lawyer John Diefenbaker – who would later become Prime Minister of Canada – and the strong-willed pair often sparred verbally. In one court hearing, McGill told the lawyer: "You ask me sensible questions, Mr. Diefenbaker, and I will give you sensible answers."

McGill was acknowledged for her "untiring" efforts and "excellent" service in annual reports by RCMP Commissioners James Howden MacBrien and Stuart Taylor Wood. During the Great Depression of the 1930s, McGill made do with dramatically fewer resources and a much smaller staff. In 1933, she kept within a budget of $17,000 for testing work that would normally have cost more than $122,000.

Volunteering hundreds of additional work hours on evenings and weekends, McGill assisted the RCMP in establishing their first official laboratory for forensic detection, which opened in 1937. Despite her experience, she was not offered the position of director for the lab. The laboratory took over a substantial portion of McGill's forensic pathology workload, and over the next several years she concentrated on other projects such as developing a polio serum and becoming a specialist in allergy research. As her expertise in allergy testing gained wider notice, doctors across the province began sending their patients to McGill. She coped with the growing demands on her time by hiring an assistant and opening a private after-hours allergy clinic located at her apartment.

McGill retired from her job as provincial pathologist on November 17, 1942, having conducted more than 64,000 laboratory examinations over the course of her civil service career. She continued working at her allergy clinic two days per week, and spent more time on outdoor activities and trips with friends. Several months afterwards, McGill decided to start a new project providing vaccinations for preschool children, and subsequently set up inoculation clinics at schools across Regina.

=== RCMP forensic lab ===
In 1943, when the director of the RCMP's forensic laboratory died in an airplane accident, McGill was called in to serve as his replacement. She accepted the position on a part-time basis, continuing to operate her allergy clinic during the afternoons.

In her new role as director, McGill conducted investigations across Saskatchewan and provided lectures and training in pathology and toxicology to new police officers and detectives, teaching skills related to identifying blood samples, studying crime scenes, and properly collecting and preserving evidence. In her advice to students, McGill emphasized the importance of critical thinking: "Don't believe all the death certificates you see. There's no reason why a man with heart disease can't have died of strychnine poisoning."

=== Retirement and consultancy ===
By 1946, McGill had formally retired from directing the RCMP forensic laboratory, and in January of that year she was named Honorary Surgeon to the RCMP, appointed by the Canadian Minister of Justice. McGill was the first woman to receive the title, and the first female doctor to be publicly acknowledged as a member of the RCMP. She continued to work for the RCMP on a special consulting basis, and occasionally gave lectures and exams for police officers and investigators. She was a thorough and articulate instructor, and her teaching notes were compiled for use in a student textbook in 1952.

Her forensic work – and her status as one of the few female members of the RCMP – had attracted notice across Canada and overseas. In 1952, she travelled to England and visited Scotland Yard, where she was permitted to inspect their forensic laboratories. In 1956, after an American detective magazine ran a story on her work, McGill received a request for assistance addressed to "Dr. Frances McGill, Canada's Famous Pathologist, Regina, Canada." The letter was from a woman in New York City whose brother had died under suspicious circumstances; no autopsy had been performed, and the woman had struggled to get the answers she wanted. Although McGill could not assist directly in the matter, she responded with advice on how to contact the FBI and arrange to have the body exhumed.

== Cases and methodology ==
McGill's work sometimes allowed her to solve murders that had gone uninvestigated. During one year, she performed post-mortem examinations of thirteen exhumed bodies, and discovered that five of the bodies were murder victims. In one case – not initially suspected as a crime at all – McGill helped prove that a woman had poisoned several relatives.

=== Lintlaw Case ===
In April 1932, farmer Joseph Shewchuk was found dead from a gunshot wound at his home in Lintlaw, Saskatchewan. Police found bloodstains all across the room – presumed evidence of a violent struggle – and also located a rifle hidden in a nearby wheat bin. The local doctor deemed it suspicious and ruled out suicide, and police arrested a neighbour who had been unable to satisfactorily explain several bloodstains on his coat.

When McGill arrived to conduct a second examination, however, she discovered that the local doctor had not completed a full autopsy on the body. She ordered the body exhumed and did a new examination herself. From clues such as the distinctly awkward angle of the wound, she concluded the victim had taken his own life. Although the previous doctor had decided that the victim must have died instantaneously, McGill found evidence in Shewchuck's digestion system that proved he had lived long enough to move around his house and hide the rifle, obscuring cause of death.

Witnesses confirmed that Shewchuk had struggled with depression, and it was found that Shewchuk had borrowed the rifle and cartridges himself shortly before his death. The accused neighbour – whose suspicious bloodstains were actually from an injured farm animal – was released. The Lintlaw Case had a strong impact on McGill's reputation with police, and the RCMP subsequently made it their policy to call her in immediately whenever foul play was suspected.

=== Northern Trapper Case ===
In November 1933, a trapper named Oskar Schwab was reported missing northeast of Nipawin. A police investigation uncovered traces of blood in his shack. Although the blood's origin was initially uncertain – since Schwab had made a living trapping and skinning animals – McGill established that blood stains at the head of Schwab's mattress were indeed human, and police located a bullet lodged in the log wall nearby.

The following February, police arrested Schwab's former trapping partner, Thomas Kisling, who admitted to killing Schwab but subsequently tried to argue that it had been accidental or in self-defence. Investigators uncovered Schwab's remains and found that the trapper's skull had been shattered into dozens of pieces by the gunshot. After completing an autopsy, McGill took the skull fragments back to her laboratory and painstakingly reconstructed it. Her work, revealing the bullet's clear trajectory and black lead markings, showed that Schwab had been shot in the back of the head while sleeping.

When McGill testified in Kisling's trial, she produced the carefully reconstructed skull from her handbag. Biographer Myrna L. Petersen describes how "a gasp went through the crowd" as court watchers realized what the pathologist was holding. Court reporter Ken Liddell later recalled in one of his columns that he had seen McGill bring out similar evidence in other court cases with "all the drama of a magician."

=== South Poplar Case ===
During a period of cold weather, a hitchhiker was found frozen to death in a southern Saskatchewan field near South Poplar, his skull apparently fractured by a blow to the head. A local doctor ruled it murder and sent the victim's remains to McGill's laboratory for further examination. When McGill examined the skull, however, she concluded that the man's bone structure had been weakened by rickets. A truck driver admitted to drinking some alcohol with the hitchhiker, which had increased blood flow to the man's brain – and after his death, the below-freezing temperatures and position of the body had caused those fluids to expand, resulting in the apparent skull fracture. McGill found no evidence of foul play. The cause of death for the hitchhiker was determined to be a simple heart attack.

== Personal life ==
McGill preferred not to discuss her personal life, but many acquaintances believed that she had lost a boyfriend to battle in the First World War. She enjoyed spending time with her siblings and other relatives whenever possible. From 1931 to 1933, her nephew Edward came to live with her in Regina while he built up his savings for university education, and he later cited her guidance and advice as a major influence on his life.

She enjoyed hosting meals and playing games of bridge with her close friends, and she was known as a good storyteller. She was an avid equestrian, often going horseback riding outside the city. McGill's other pastimes included fishing, camping, and shooting, and in 1917 she won a prize in a women's rifle competition. For bedtime reading, she often indulged in crime fiction. During the Second World War, McGill supported the war effort by knitting wool socks for soldiers who were fighting abroad. She was a member of the Saskatchewan Medical Society, the Canadian College of Physicians and Surgeons, the Business and Professional Women's Club, and the Regina Women's Canadian Club.

McGill was a member of the Anglican Church. She was Conservative in her politics, and eventually became a strong supporter of John Diefenbaker's political career as he ran for parliament and then Prime Minister. In 1958, despite serious health issues, McGill discharged herself from hospital and went home to vote for Diefenbaker in the federal election.

She enjoyed travelling abroad and did so extensively, visiting New Zealand, Australia, South Africa, Mexico, the West Indies and multiple European countries.

== Death and legacy ==
McGill died aged 76 on January 21, 1959, in Winnipeg, having been diagnosed with breast cancer and later pleurisy. She was cremated, and her ashes were scattered by family at a favourite plot of land in Cherry Valley, Manitoba. Obituaries described McGill as "one of Canada's best-known criminologists", and an editorial in the Leader-Post reflected that McGill's extensive professional contributions and lasting relationships with friends and colleagues had earned her "a measure of immortality" surpassed by few other Canadians.

In 2024 she was recognized as "a person of national historic significance" under Parks Canada's National Program of Historical Commemoration.

McGill Lake, located north of Lake Athabasca in Saskatchewan, is named in her honour.

She is a member of the Canadian Science and Engineering Hall of Fame.

== See also ==
- Timeline of women in science
