= Clif Evans =

Canadian politician

Member of the Legislative Assembly of Manitoba for Interlake
- In office September 11, 1990 – September 21, 1999
- Preceded by: Bill Uruski
- Succeeded by: Tom Nevakshonoff

Personal details
- Born: May 16, 1946 Winnipeg, Manitoba, Canada
- Died: May 6, 2022 (aged 75) Winnipeg, Manitoba, Canada
- Party: New Democratic

Clifford (Clif) Brian Evans (May 16, 1948 – May 6, 2022) was a Canadian politician. He represented the former Interlake electoral district in the Legislative Assembly of Manitoba from 1990 to 1999.

Before entering political life, Evans worked for ten years in the hotel business and twelve years in the oil and chemical plant industry. He was elected Mayor of Riverton, Manitoba in October 1989, and held the position until his election to the provincial legislature the following year.

Evans was elected as a New Democrat in the provincial election of 1990, defeating Progressive Conservative candidate Ed Trachuk in the mid-northern riding of Interlake by about 400 votes. The election was won by the Progressive Conservatives, and Evans sat in the Official Opposition.

The Progressive Conservatives again nominated Trachuk against Evans for the provincial election of 1995, but of greater long-term significance was the candidacy of Darryl Sutherland, from Independent Native Voice (a group which purported to represent aboriginal interests in the region). A government inquiry would subsequently establish that Sutherland's candidacy had been encouraged, financed and organized by leading figures in the riding's Progressive Conservative network, in the hopes that Sutherland would take enough votes away from the NDP to allow a PC victory (the aboriginal communities of northern Manitoba have generally supported the NDP, at least since the early 1970s).

As it happened, this attempted vote-splitting was unsuccessful and Evans was re-elected by a greater margin than before. Sutherland's 289 votes were not enough to make a difference in the outcome, and most of the riding's aboriginal voters supported Evans (who had, in fact, been publicly endorsed by the chiefs of the eight Interlake First Nations).

Evans had heard rumours about Sutherland's candidacy during the campaign (in fact, some suspicions were raised in the Winnipeg Free Press shortly before election day). He did not raise the issue himself during the campaign, although former NDP cabinet minister Bill Uruski and other figures within the party conducted some investigations on the matter.

In early 1998, Evans and fellow NDP MLA Tim Sale received information that leading PC organizer Taras Sokolyk had played a role in encouraging INV candidates in the previous election. According to Doug Smith's As Many Liars (a literary overview of the scandal), Evans was able to confirm this information through a discussion with Allan Aitken, a PC organizer in the region (who had previously been among Evans's personal friends). Under pressure from the NDP caucus and some elements of the media, Premier Gary Filmon called a public inquiry into the scandal, which found that Sutherland's candidacy had been encouraged by Progressive Conservative interests with the intention of causing vote-splitting.

Ironically, Evans's own career was damaged by the scandal inquiry. The PCs raised concerns about connections between Evans and Sale and the Canadian Broadcasting Corporation, which had publicized the story in early 1998. The government also attempted to show inconsistencies in Evans's statements to the legislature on the subject (as to whether or not he believed there were "two Tory campaigns" in the riding). These allegations were not particularly serious, but the attacks on his credibility seem to have played a role in Evans's decision not to seek re-election in 1999. He has not re-entered public life since this time.

Evans supported Lorne Nystrom's bid to lead the federal New Democratic Party in 1995.
