= Eugene Kostyra =

Canadian politician (1947–2020)

Member of the Legislative Assembly of Manitoba for Seven Oaks
- In office November 17, 1981 – April 26, 1988
- Preceded by: Saul Miller
- Succeeded by: Mark Minenko

Personal details
- Born: Eugene Michael Kostyra; June 19, 1947
- Died: May 3, 2020 (aged 72) Winnipeg, Manitoba
- Party: New Democratic Party

Eugene Michael Kostyra (June 19, 1947 – May 3, 2020) was a Canadian politician in Manitoba. He was a member of the Legislative Assembly of Manitoba from 1981 to 1988 and a cabinet minister in the New Democratic Party government of Howard Pawley.

== Early life ==
Born on June 19, 1947, to Albert Kostyra and Jean Swetz, Eugene Michael Kostyra was educated at Ralph Brown Elementary School and Isaac Newton Junior High School. He dropped out of St. John's High School and worked as a clerk-typist and journeyman electrician. He became involved in Manitoba's trade union movement before entering politics, holding a prominent position in the Canadian Union of Public Employees (CUPE).

== Career ==
=== Politics ===
In the provincial election of 1981, Kostyra was elected for the north-end Winnipeg riding of Seven Oaks. On November 30, 1981, he was named Minister of Consumer and Corporate Affairs, Minister of Culture, Heritage and Recreation and Minister of Urban Affairs, with responsibility for the Manitoba Housing and Renewal Corporation. He lost the last of these positions on February 12, 1982, although not before establishing the first rent controls in the province.

On August 20, 1982, Kostyra was removed from the Consumer and Corporate Affairs portfolio and given responsibility for the Public Print Act and the Office of the Queen's Printer. On November 4, 1983, he was relieved of these latter responsibilities and the Urban Affairs portfolio, and named Minister of Industry, Trade and Technology, with responsibility for Manitoba Data Services and the Manitoba Development Corporation. On January 30, 1985, he was also given responsibility for the Manitoba Lotteries Foundation.

Kostyra was re-elected in the provincial election of 1986. Following a cabinet shuffle on April 17, 1986, he was promoted to the senior position of Finance Minister and Chairman of the Manitoba Treasury Board, with responsibility for the Civil Service Act, the Civil Service Special Supplementary Benefit Act, and the Public Servants Insurance Act. He also retained responsibility for the Manitoba Development Corporation until February 4, 1987. On September 21, 1987, he was named minister responsible for A.E. McKenzie Co. Ltd.

In early 1988, Kostyra introduced his government's annual budget to the legislature, with the expectation that it would be passed by the narrow NDP majority in parliament. Instead, the government was defeated when disgruntled NDP backbencher Jim Walding voted against the budget, despite having promised Kostyra that he would support it. The NDP had lost considerable support in the two years since their 1986 re-election, primarily as a result of the increased automobile insurance rates in the province and significant revenue shortfalls in the province's publicly owned telephone system. The NDP entered the 1988 election with almost no hope of retaining government, and retained only twelve seats; Kostyra himself was defeated in Seven Oaks by Liberal Mark Minenko.

=== Later career ===
Kostyra remained active in the labour movement after his loss, serving as a Regional Director of CUPE Manitoba. He was also an active promoter of credit unions over large banks in this period. In 1999, he was appointed by the NDP government of Gary Doer to head the province's powerful Community and Economic Development Committee of Cabinet.

In 2003, Kostyra supported Bill Blaikie for the leadership of the federal New Democratic Party.

== Death ==
Kostyra died on May 3, 2020, in Winnipeg, Manitoba.
