= John Nesbitt Kirchhoffer =

Canadian politician

The Honourable John Nesbitt Kirchhoffer
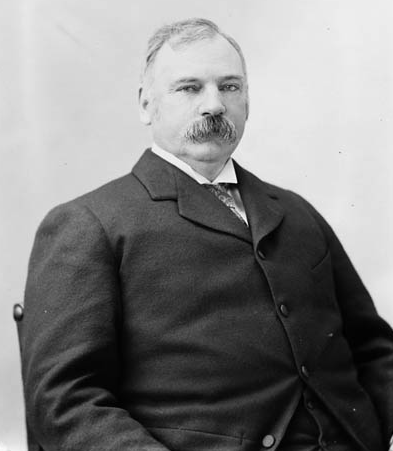

Canadian Senator from Manitoba
- In office 1892–1914
- Appointed by: John Sparrow David Thompson

Member of the Legislative Assembly of Manitoba for Brandon West
- In office 1886–1888

Personal details
- Born: May 5, 1848 Ballyvourney, County Cork, Ireland
- Died: December 22, 1914 (aged 66)
- Party: Conservative

John Nesbitt Kirchhoffer (May 5, 1848 – December 22, 1914) was a Canadian politician.

== Early life and career ==
Born in Ballyvourney, County Cork, Ireland, the son of the Reverend Richard B. Kirchhoffer, Rector of Ballyvourney Parish, he was educated at Marlborough College and came to Canada in 1864. Kirchhoffer served as an ensign in the Fenian raids in 1866 and subsequently was captain of one of the Companies of the Port Hope (46th) Battalion. He was called to the Ontario Bar in October 1871 and practiced law in Port Hope, Ontario, with his uncle, Nesbitt Kirchhoffer.

He moved to Manitoba in 1883, and was called to the Manitoba Bar in 1884. Kirchhoffer founded the town of Souris, Manitoba, and the Plum Creek settlement, and served as Reeve and Mayor of Souris. He was a member of the Legislative Assembly of Manitoba from 1886 to 1888 representing Brandon West. Kirchhoffer also served on the Western Judicial District Board, representing Brandon and Dennis counties. He was called to the Senate on December 16, 1892, on the advice of John Sparrow David Thompson representing the senatorial division of Selkirk, Manitoba. A Conservative, he was chairman of the Senate Divorce Committee in 1895 and 1896, and of the Senate Contingent Committee in 1897. He served 22 years until his death in 1914.

== Cricket career ==
Kirchhoffer was also a keen cricketer, representing Canada in a match against the United States on the Germantown Cricket Club Ground, Nicetown, Philadelphia in 1880, scoring one run and taking two catches in a drawn match. He served as president of the Ontario Cricket Club and of the Canadian Zingari cricket club. In 1881 and 1882, Kirchhoffer captained Canadian International cricket teams which played against the United States.
