= Russell Paulley =

Canadian politician (1909–1984)

11th Manitoba Minister of Labour
- In office July 15, 1969 – October 24, 1977
- Premier: Edward Schreyer
- Preceded by: Charles Witney
- Succeeded by: Norma Price

Manitoba Minister of Government Services
- In office December 18, 1969 – September 3, 1970
- Premier: Edward Schreyer
- Preceded by: Howard Pawley
- Succeeded by: Joseph Borowski

Leader of the New Democratic Party of Manitoba
- In office November 4, 1961 – June 7, 1969
- Preceded by: Himself as leader of the Manitoba CCF
- Succeeded by: Edward Schreyer

Leader of the Manitoba Co-operative Commonwealth Federation
- In office 1960–1961
- Preceded by: Lloyd Stinson
- Succeeded by: Himself as leader of the Manitoba NDP

Member of the Legislative Assembly of Manitoba for Transcona
- In office June 25, 1969 – June 28, 1973
- Preceded by: new constituency
- Succeeded by: Wilson Parasiuk

Member of the Legislative Assembly of Manitoba for Radisson
- In office June 16, 1958 – June 25, 1969
- Preceded by: new constituency
- Succeeded by: Harry Shafransky

Member of the Legislative Assembly of Manitoba for Kildonan—Transcona
- In office June 8, 1953 – June 16, 1958
- Preceded by: George Olive
- Succeeded by: constituency abolished

Personal details
- Born: November 3, 1909 Winnipeg, Manitoba
- Died: May 19, 1984 (aged 74)
- Party: Co-operative Commonwealth Federation (1949-1961); New Democratic Party (1961-1977)
- Occupation: Upholsterer

Andrew Russell Paulley (November 3, 1909 – May 19, 1984) was a Canadian politician. He served as leader of the Manitoba Co-operative Commonwealth Federation from 1959 to 1961, and its successor, the New Democratic Party of Manitoba, from 1961 to 1969.

The son of Frederick Henry Paulley and Elizabeth Mary Partington, originally from Cerne Abbas, Dorset. Paulley was born in Winnipeg, Manitoba and was educated in the city. In 1938, he married Mary Alice Sinclair. He moved to the suburb of Transcona and worked as a foreman upholsterer for the Canadian National Railway. Paulley served as mayor of Transcona from 1946 to 1949 and from 1952 to 1953. He also became a Freemason, and was involved in the province's socialist politics.

Paulley was a CCF candidate for St. Boniface in the federal election of 1949, finishing a distant second to Liberal Fernand Viau. He turned to provincial politics for the 1953 provincial election, and was elected for the riding of Kildonan—Transcona. After redistribution, he was re-elected for Radisson in 1958 and 1959.

CCF leader Lloyd Stinson lost his seat in the 1959 election, and Paulley was selected as interim leader in his place. In 1960, he was confirmed at a party convention as Stinson's permanent replacement. Like all previous CCF and ILP leaders in Manitoba, he was elected without opposition.

The late 1950s was a period of transformation for the Manitoba CCF, as the federal party was in the process of merging with the Canadian Labour Congress to create the New Democratic Party. There was no strong opposition to the change in Manitoba, and the provincial CCF formally dissolved itself in 1961 to be succeeded by the New Democratic Party of Manitoba. On November 4, 1961, Paulley defeated Cliff Matthews and Hans Fries at a delegated convention to become the new party's leader.

The elections of 1962 and 1966 were disappointments for the Manitoba NDP. In the late 1950s, the CCF under Lloyd Stinson had made modest increases from its previous standing, and some party members believed that the NDP was well-positioned to replace the Liberals as the main opposition to Dufferin Roblin's Progressive Conservative government.

This did not occur. Roblin's government was fairly progressive, and won the support of many centre-left voters. Roblin was also a more popular figure than Paulley on a personal level. The Liberals, for their part, still had a support base in the province's rural and francophone communities, and were also able to win a few Winnipeg-area seats. The NDP fell from ten seats to seven in 1962. It recovered to eleven seats in 1966, but was still relegated to third-party status.

Paulley, who was re-elected on both occasions, faced increased opposition from a "modernizing" wing within the party. There was a growing belief among NDP Members of the Legislative Assembly (MLAs) that Paulley, while a good representative of labour interests, could not lead the party to victory at the polls. In 1968, he faced a leadership challenge from MLA Sidney Green, a labour lawyer from the riding of Inkster in north-end Winnipeg.

The contest between Paulley and Green exposed a number of divisions within the Manitoba NDP. Green claimed (probably correctly) that he was not challenging Paulley on ideological grounds, but his campaign was nevertheless depicted by some as "radical left". Paulley, in turn, was depicted as representing an "old labourite" demographic, unable to reach out to a younger voters or communities which had not previously supported the CCF and NDP.

Paulley fended off Green's challenge by unusual means. During the campaign, eight NDP MLAs signed a letter calling for Paulley to be re-elected such that he could stand aside for Edward Schreyer the following year. Paulley responded to this endorsement by claiming that he had long regarded Schreyer as the best choice to be his successor, though he was somewhat ambiguous as to whether he would actually resign if re-elected.

At the 1968 leadership convention, Paulley received 213 votes to Green's 168. Despite making a half-hearted attempt to retain power, he resigned as leader the following year and Ed Schreyer ran to replace him. Schreyer defeated Green by 506 votes to 177 in the leadership race held shortly thereafter.

Under Schreyer's leadership, the NDP won an upset victory in the election of 1969. Paulley was re-elected in Transcona, and was sworn in as Minister of Labour and Railway Commissioner on July 15, 1969. He also became Minister of Government Services on December 18, holding his position until September 3, 1970. He stepped down as Railway Commissioner on February 16, 1973, though continuing to hold the Labour portfolio. He was the Deputy Premier of Manitoba from c1973 to 1977.

Paulley was one of several MLAs in the Winnipeg area to be targeted by a conservative "citizen's group" in the election of 1973. The group in question convinced the Progressive Conservative and Liberal parties to avoid competing against each other in certain ridings, such that a single "anti-socialist" candidate could be offered. Facing Tory Phil Rizzuto as his only opponent, Paulley nevertheless won re-election by 6275 votes to 4151.

Paulley continued to serve as Minister of Labour throughout the second Schreyer government, also taking responsibility for the Civil Service Superannuation Act and Public Servants Insurance Act, and (after September 22, 1976) the Pension Benefits Act. He did not seek re-election in 1977, and did not play a significant role in public life following his retirement.

Paulley died on May 19, 1984.
