= Harold McGill =

Canadian politician

Harold Wigmore McGill
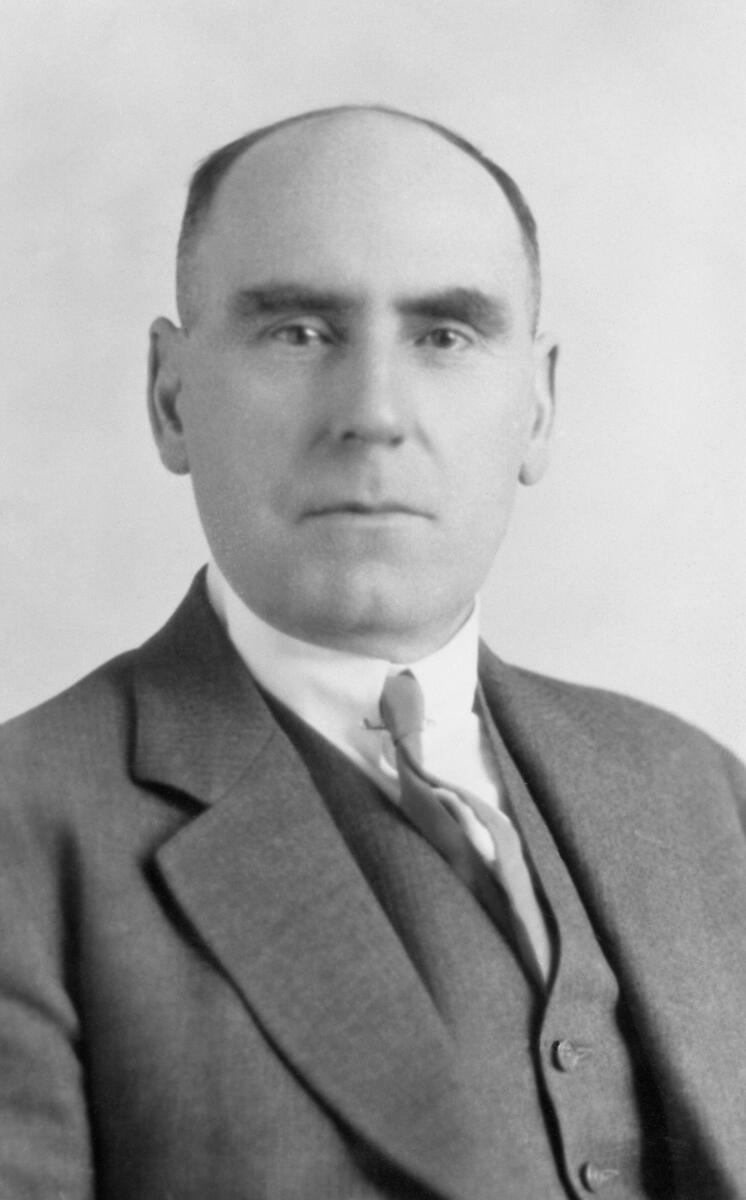

Member of the Legislative Assembly of Alberta for Calgary
- In office June 19, 1930 – October 13, 1932
- Preceded by: Alexander McGillivray; Robert Parkyn
- Succeeded by: Norman Hindsley

Personal details
- Born: December 21, 1879 Norwood, Ontario
- Died: July 3, 1961 (aged 81) Vancouver, British Columbia
- Party: Conservative
- Relatives: Frances Gertrude McGill (sister)
- Education: University of Manitoba

Military service
- Allegiance: Canada
- Branch/service: Canadian Expeditionary Force
- Rank: Major
- Battles/wars: World War I

Dr. Major Harold Wigmore McGill (December 21, 1879 – July 3, 1961) was a Canadian physician and provincial politician from Alberta. He served in the Legislative Assembly of Alberta and the Council of the Northwest Territories. His sister, Frances Gertrude McGill, was the provincial bacteriologist and pathologist in Saskatchewan.

== Early life ==
Harold Wigmore McGill was born December 21, 1879, in Norwood, Ontario. His parents were Edward McGill, whose family had emigrated from Ireland to Canada in 1819, and Henrietta Wigmore, also of Irish descent.[4]:xviii Henrietta was a former school teacher, and had once circumnavigated the globe, travelling to New Zealand for a teaching job and later returning to Canada. Edward was active in local politics and agricultural societies, and worked as the postmaster in Minnedosa. Harold had and older brother, Herbert, and two younger sisters named Frances and Margaret. Margaret became a nurse and joined the Canadian Army Medical Corps. In mid-1900, his parents became ill with typhoid fever after drinking contaminated water at a county fair. Both died in September within ten days of each other. McGill's eldest brother, Herbert, took over the running of the family farm until his younger siblings had completed their basic schooling. McGill graduated from medical school at the University of Manitoba in 1905.

He served as the physician for the Tsuutʼina Nation after he came to Calgary in 1910. In 1917 he married Kansas-born, Ontario-raised Emma Mildred Griffis (1884–1971).

Harold went overseas to fight in World War I, and his wife Emma moved to England to serve as a nurse. McGill was instrumental in describing the effects of shellshock during World War I

== Political career ==
McGill was elected Alderman on Calgary City Council in the 1926 Calgary municipal election, a post he held until 1930.

McGill was elected to the Legislative Assembly of Alberta for the Conservative Party in the 1930 Alberta general election. He ended up elected to the 6th seat in the Calgary electoral district, in the 10th vote count.

McGill served in the Legislature for just over two years before vacating his seat. He was appointed as Deputy Superintendent-General of Indian Affairs in Ottawa. His appointment took effect and he vacated his seat in the Alberta Legislature on October 14, 1932

The post also entitled him to a seat in the Northwest Territories government. He was appointed to the 2nd Council of the Northwest Territories and served as a member until 1947.

Preceded by Alexander McGillivray; Robert Parkyn	MLA Calgary #6, AB; 1930–1933	Succeeded by Norman Hindsley
