= Reg Helwer =

Canadian politician

Minister of Labour, Consumer Protection and Government Services
- In office January 18, 2022 – January 30, 2023
- Premier: Heather Stefanson
- Preceded by: Portfolio Renamed
- Succeeded by: James Teitsma

Minister of Infrastructure
- In office December 30, 2021 – January 18, 2022
- Premier: Heather Stefanson
- Preceded by: Ron Schuler
- Succeeded by: Doyle Piwniuk

Minister of Central Services
- In office October 23, 2021 – January 18, 2022
- Premier: Brian Pallister; Kelvin Goertzen; Heather Stefanson
- Preceded by: Portfolio Established
- Succeeded by: Portfolio Renamed

Minister Responsible for the Civil Service Commission
- In office October 23, 2019 – January 30, 2023
- Premier: Brian Pallister; Kelvin Goertzen; Heather Stefanson
- Preceded by: Scott Fielding
- Succeeded by: James Teitsma

Member of the Legislative Assembly of Manitoba for Brandon West
- In office October 4, 2011 – September 5, 2023
- Preceded by: Rick Borotsik
- Succeeded by: Wayne Balcaen

Personal details
- Born: Selkirk, Manitoba, Canada
- Party: Progressive Conservative

Reg Helwer is a Canadian politician who was elected to the Legislative Assembly of Manitoba in the 2011 provincial election. He represents the electoral district of Brandon West as a member of the Progressive Conservative Party of Manitoba caucus. On October 23, 2019, he was appointed minister of Labour, Consumer Protection and Government Services (Called Central Services from 2016-2022) and also served briefly as minister of Infrastructure.

== Electoral record ==
2019 Manitoba general election: Brandon West
Party	Candidate	Votes	%	±%	Expenditures
Progressive Conservative	Reg Helwer	4,311	58.39	-9.8	$20,202.15
New Democratic	Nick Brown	1,757	23.80	-0.4	$1,132.68
Green	Robert Brown	748	10.13	–	$33.24
Liberal	Sunday Frangi	567	7.68	-0.0	$541.53
Total valid votes		7,383	99.15	–	
Rejected		63	0.65		
Turnout		7,446	51.27		
Eligible voters		14,522			
Progressive Conservative hold		Swing		-4.7	
Source(s) Source: Manitoba. Chief Electoral Officer (2019). Statement of Votes for the 42nd Provincial General Election, September 10, 2019 (PDF) (Report). Winnipeg: Elections Manitoba. "Candidate Election Returns". Elections Manitoba. Elections Manitoba.

2016 Manitoba general election: Brandon West
Party	Candidate	Votes	%	±%	Expenditures
Progressive Conservative	Reg Helwer	5,624	69.10	20.42	$33,113.21
New Democratic	Linda Ross	1,884	23.15	-23.79	$13,539.46
Liberal	Billy Moore	631	7.75	3.37	$1,314.33
Total valid votes		8,139	–	–	
Rejected		202	–		
Eligible voters / turnout		14,914	55.93	-3.86	
Source(s) Source: Manitoba. Chief Electoral Officer (2016). Statement of Votes for the 41st Provincial General Election, April 19, 2016 (PDF) (Report). Winnipeg: Elections Manitoba. "Election Returns: 41st General Election". Elections Manitoba. 2016.

2011 Manitoba general election: Brandon West
Party	Candidate	Votes	%	±%	Expenditures
Progressive Conservative	Reg Helwer	4,231	48.68	0.63	$29,570.60
New Democratic	Jim Murray	4,080	46.94	-0.54	$24,888.84
Liberal	George Buri	381	4.38	0.34	$7,641.08
Total valid votes		8,692	–	–	
Rejected		41	–		
Eligible voters / turnout		14,607	59.79	-7.02	
Source(s) Source: Manitoba. Chief Electoral Officer (2011). Statement of Votes for the 40th Provincial General Election, October 4, 2011 (PDF) (Report). Winnipeg: Elections Manitoba. "Election Returns: 40th General Election". Elections Manitoba. 2011.
