= Minister of Labour and Immigration (Manitoba) =

The Minister of Labour and Immigration of the Canadian province of Manitoba is a member of the Executive Council of Manitoba, which is informally known as the Cabinet. This position was formerly known as the Minister of Labour. The Current Minister of Labour and Immigration is Malaya Marcelino.

From January 13, 2012, to October 18, 2013, the responsibilities of this portfolio were redistributed between the Minister of Family Services and Labour and the Minister of Immigration and Multiculturalism.

== List of ministers of labour and immigration in Manitoba ==
- (*) Official title: Minister of Labour and Manpower.
- (**) Official title: Minister of Labour and Housing.

Name	Party	Took office	Left office
William Clubb	Lib-Prog	May 27, 1932	November 4, 1940
Seymour Farmer	CCF	November 4, 1940	December 19, 1942
Errick Willis	Cons	December 19, 1942	February 5, 1944
James McLenaghen	PC	February 5, 1944	February 11, 1946
C. Rhodes Smith	Lib-Prog	February 11, 1946	December 14, 1948
Charles Greenlay	PC	December 14, 1948	1950
	Lib-Prog	1950	June 30, 1958
John W.M. Thompson	PC	June 30, 1958	December 21, 1959
John Benson Carroll	PC	December 21, 1959	December 27, 1963
Obie Baizley	PC	February 27, 1963	September 24, 1968
Charles Witney	PC	September 24, 1968	July 15, 1969
Russell Paulley	NDP	July 15, 1969	October 24, 1977
Norma Price	PC	October 24, 1977	October 20, 1978
Ken MacMaster(*)	PC	October 20, 1978	November 30, 1981
Victor Schroeder(*)	NDP	November 30, 1981	July 19, 1982
Mary Dolin(*)	NDP	July 19, 1982	January 30, 1985
Alvin Mackling	NDP	January 30, 1985	September 21, 1987
Muriel Smith(**)	NDP	September 21, 1987	May 9, 1988
Edward Connery	PC	May 9, 1988	April 21, 1989
Gerrie Hammond	PC	April 21, 1989	September 11, 1990
Darren Praznik	PC	September 11, 1990	May 9, 1995
Vic Toews	PC	May 9, 1995	January 6, 1997
Harold Gilleshammer	PC	January 6, 1997	February 5, 1999
Mike Radcliffe	PC	February 5, 1999	October 5, 1999
Becky Barrett	NDP	October 5, 1999	June 25, 2003
Steve Ashton	NDP	June 25, 2003	November 4, 2003
Nancy Allan	NDP	November 4, 2003	November 3, 2009
Jennifer Howard	NDP	November 3, 2009	January 13, 2012
Erna Braun	NDP	October 18, 2013	May 3, 2016
Jon Reyes	PC	January 30, 2023	October 18, 2023
Malaya Marcelino	NDP	October 18, 2023	incumbent
