= Ken Dillen =

Canadian politician (1938–2020)

Member of the Legislative Assembly of Manitoba for Thompson
- In office June 28, 1973 – October 11, 1977
- Preceded by: Joseph Borowski
- Succeeded by: Ken MacMaster

Personal details
- Born: April 29, 1938 Serpent River First Nation, Cutler, Ontario, CAnada
- Died: April 20, 2020 (aged 81) Cutler, Ontario, Canada
- Party: New Democratic Party of Manitoba

Kenneth George Dillen (April 29, 1938 – April 20, 2020) was a Canadian politician and political activist. He was a member of the Legislative Assembly of Manitoba from 1973 to 1977, serving as a member of the social democratic New Democratic Party. His political views later shifted to the right, and he ran for re-election to the Manitoba legislature in 2011 as a candidate of the Manitoba Liberal Party.

== Early life and career ==
Dillen was born at the Serpent River Indian Reserve in Cutler, Ontario, and was educated in Ontario schools and at the Canadian Army Apprentice Training School in Camp Borden. He trained as an ironworker and became president of United Steel Workers local 6166 after moving to Manitoba. He was also a member of the Manitoba Métis Federation in the 1970s.

== Legislator ==
He was elected to the Manitoba legislature in the 1973 provincial election, narrowly defeating Progressive Conservative candidate Anna Derby in the northern riding of Thompson. He was the province's first Member of the Legislative Assembly of Indigenous background in several years.

The New Democratic Party won a majority government in this election under Edward Schreyer's leadership. Dillen entered the legislature as a government backbencher, serving as Schreyer's legislative assistant. He lost to Progressive Conservative candidate Ken MacMaster by 916 votes in the 1977 provincial election.

Dillen later moved to Saskatchewan and held several positions, including field staff coordinator for the Key Lake Board of Inquiry, overseeing uranium mining operations. He was also a member of the Interprovincial Association on Native Employment, the Interprovincial Inland Fisherman's Association, and the Canadian Taxpayers Federation.

Despite his background in the labour movement and New Democratic Party, Dillen became a supporter of the "right-to-work" movement and an opponent of closed shop unionization. In late 2004, he referred to the Saskatchewan NDP as communistic for its efforts to unionize part-time workers. He also dismissed the right-wing Saskatchewan Party as "nothing more than disaffected socialists" and cited Milton Friedman's Capitalism and Freedom as representative of his own beliefs. Dillen also opposed gun control, the Canadian Wheat Board and the Kyoto Accord, and spoke against efforts by the Ontario government to ban pit bulls.

In the late 2000s, he was secretary of the Prairie Centre Policy Institute. He returned to Manitoba after spending some years in Saskatchewan, and ran for re-election as a Liberal for the Thompson electoral division in 2011, finishing third to New Democratic MLA Steve Ashton and Tory candidate Anita Campbell. Dillen died in Cutler, Ontario on April 20, 2020, nine days shy of his 82nd birthday.

== Electoral record ==
1977 Manitoba general election: Thompson
Party	Candidate	Votes	%	±%
Progressive Conservative	Ken MacMaster	3,947	54.36	+20.41
New Democratic	Ken Dillen	3,031	41.74	+4.21
Liberal	Oliver James Monkman	283	3.90	-24.62
Total valid votes		7,261	99.56	
Rejected and declined votes		32	0.44	-0.01
Turnout		7,293	67.62	-3.68
Registered voters		10,786		
Progressive Conservative gain from New Democratic		Swing		+8.10
Source: Elections Manitoba

1973 Manitoba general election: Thompson
Party	Candidate	Votes	%
New Democratic	Ken Dillen	2,742	37.54
Progressive Conservative	Anna Denby	2,480	33.95
Liberal	Blain Johnston	2,083	28.51
Total valid votes		7,305	100.00
Rejected votes		33	
Turnout		7,338	71.30
Electors on the lists		10,292	
