= Interlake =

Defunct provincial electoral district in Manitoba, Canada

Coordinates: 51.426°N 97.998°W

Manitoba electoral district
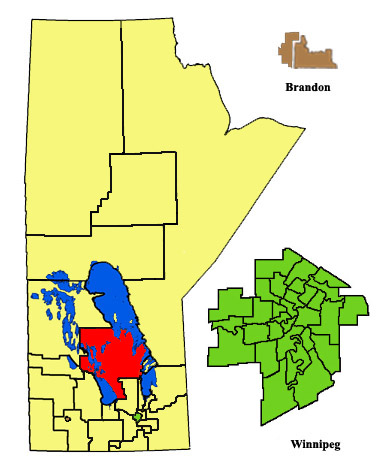

Defunct provincial electoral district
- Legislature: Legislative Assembly of Manitoba
- District created: 1979
- First contested: 1981
- Last contested: 2016

Interlake was a provincial electoral district of Manitoba, Canada. It was created by redistribution in 1979, and has formally existed since the 1981 provincial election. Previously, much of the Interlake region was included in the constituency of St. George. As its name implies, Interlake was located between Lake Winnipeg and Lake Manitoba, in the mid-northern section of the province.

Interlake was bordered to the east by Lake Winnipeg, to the south by Lakeside and Gimli, to the north by Swan River, and to the west by Lake Manitoba. Communities in the riding include Arborg, Riverton, Ashern, and Fraserwood. The Black and Deer Islands are also located in the riding.

Prior to the 2019 Manitoba general election, Interlake was abolished and its area was redistributed to the new riding of Interlake-Gimli.

In 1996, the riding's population was 18,653. In 1999, the average family income was $32,570, and the unemployment rate was 10.60%. Twenty-two per cent of the riding's residents are listed as low-income. Almost 25% of the riding's residents have less than a Grade 9 education.

Agriculture accounts for 22% of Interlake's industry, followed by government services at 13%.

Interlake had been represented continuously by members of the New Democratic Party since its creation. That ended with the 2016 election. In 1995, local members of the Progressive Conservative Party attempted to rig the voting results by promoting a candidate from Independent Native Voice, a minor party. The plan was unsuccessful and caused a major provincial scandal when its details were revealed to the public in 1998–99.

== Members of the Legislative Assembly ==
Name	Party	Took office	Left office
Bill Uruski	NDP	1981	1990
Clif Evans	NDP	1990	1999
Tom Nevakshonoff	NDP	1999	2016
Derek Johnson	Prog. Cons.	2016	2019 (riding abolished)

== Electoral results ==
=== 1981 ===
1981 Manitoba general election
Party	Candidate	Votes	%
New Democratic	Bill Uruski	4,599	64.30
Progressive Conservative	Neil Dueck	2,181	30.49
Liberal	Bob Lundale	372	5.20
Total valid votes		7,152	–
Rejected		34	–
Eligible voters / Turnout		10,585	67.89
Source(s) Source: Manitoba. Chief Electoral Officer (1999). Statement of Votes for the 37th Provincial General Election, September 21, 1999 (PDF) (Report). Winnipeg: Elections Manitoba.

=== 1986 ===
1986 Manitoba general election
Party	Candidate	Votes	%	±%
New Democratic	Bill Uruski	4,634	61.30	-3.00
Progressive Conservative	Joe Schwartz	2,181	28.85	-1.64
Liberal	Bob Lundale	455	6.02	0.82
Confederation of Regions	Dieter Wenzel	289	3.82	–
Total valid votes		7,559	–	–
Rejected		18	–	
Eligible voters / Turnout		11,466	66.08	-1.81
Source(s) Source: Manitoba. Chief Electoral Officer (1999). Statement of Votes for the 37th Provincial General Election, September 21, 1999 (PDF) (Report). Winnipeg: Elections Manitoba.

=== 1988 ===
1988 Manitoba general election
Party	Candidate	Votes	%	±%
New Democratic	Bill Uruski	3,057	39.99	-21.31
Progressive Conservative	Ed Dandeneau	2,810	36.76	7.91
Liberal	Clyde Sigurdson	1,777	23.25	17.23
Total valid votes		7,644	–	–
Rejected		13	–	
Eligible voters / Turnout		11,329	67.59	1.51
Source(s) Source: Manitoba. Chief Electoral Officer (1999). Statement of Votes for the 37th Provincial General Election, September 21, 1999 (PDF) (Report). Winnipeg: Elections Manitoba.

=== 1990 ===
1990 Manitoba general election
Party	Candidate	Votes	%	±%
New Democratic	Clif Evans	2,941	40.54	0.55
Progressive Conservative	Ed Trachuk	2,533	34.91	-1.85
Liberal	Duncan Edward Geisler	1,781	24.55	1.30
Total valid votes		7,255	–	–
Rejected		16	–	
Eligible voters / Turnout		11,562	62.89	-4.70
Source(s) Source: Manitoba. Chief Electoral Officer (1999). Statement of Votes for the 37th Provincial General Election, September 21, 1999 (PDF) (Report). Winnipeg: Elections Manitoba.

=== 1995 ===
1995 Manitoba general election
Party	Candidate	Votes	%	±%
New Democratic	Clif Evans	3,791	51.17	10.64
Progressive Conservative	Ed Trachuk	2,562	34.58	-0.33
Liberal	Duncan Edward Geisler	766	10.34	-14.21
Independent	Darryl Sutherland	289	3.90	–
Total valid votes		7,408	–	–
Rejected		28	–	
Eligible voters / Turnout		11,602	64.09	1.21
Source(s) Source: Manitoba. Chief Electoral Officer (1999). Statement of Votes for the 37th Provincial General Election, September 21, 1999 (PDF) (Report). Winnipeg: Elections Manitoba.

=== 1999 ===
1999 Manitoba general election
Party	Candidate	Votes	%	±%	Expenditures
New Democratic	Tom Nevakshonoff	3,809	48.59	-2.58	$22,797.00
Progressive Conservative	Betty Green	3,260	41.59	7.00	$28,978.73
Liberal	Margaret Swan	770	9.82	-0.52	$7,010.62
Total valid votes		7,839	–	–	
Rejected		66	–		
Eligible voters / turnout		12,550	62.99	-1.10	
Source(s) Source: Manitoba. Chief Electoral Officer (1999). Statement of Votes for the 37th Provincial General Election, September 21, 1999 (PDF) (Report). Winnipeg: Elections Manitoba.

=== 2003 ===
2003 Manitoba general election
Party	Candidate	Votes	%	±%	Expenditures
New Democratic	Tom Nevakshonoff	3,858	63.76	15.17	$19,548.96
Progressive Conservative	Betty Green	1,796	29.68	-11.91	$8,870.79
Liberal	Leslie Jacobson	397	6.56	-3.26	$4,774.14
Total valid votes		6,051	–	–	
Rejected		22	–		
Eligible voters / Turnout		12,170	49.90	-13.09	
Source(s) Source: Manitoba. Chief Electoral Officer (2003). Statement of Votes for the 38th Provincial General Election, June 3, 2003 (PDF) (Report). Winnipeg: Elections Manitoba.

=== 2007 ===
2007 Manitoba general election
Party	Candidate	Votes	%	±%	Expenditures
New Democratic	Tom Nevakshonoff	4,047	59.51	-4.25	$19,408.47
Progressive Conservative	Garry Wasylowski	2,445	35.95	6.27	$24,946.26
Liberal	Franklin Swark	309	4.54	-2.02	$340.30
Total valid votes		6,801	–	–	
Rejected		25	–		
Eligible voters / turnout		12,074	56.53	6.63	
Source(s) Source: Manitoba. Chief Electoral Officer (2007). Statement of Votes for the 39th Provincial General Election, May 22, 2007 (PDF) (Report). Winnipeg: Elections Manitoba.

=== 2011 ===
2011 Manitoba general election
Party	Candidate	Votes	%	±%	Expenditures
New Democratic	Tom Nevakshonoff	3,374	50.46	-9.04	$30,369.21
Progressive Conservative	Steve Lupky	2,903	43.42	7.47	$26,066.30
Independent	John Zasitko	215	3.22	–	$3,199.84
Liberal	Albert Ratt	194	2.90	-1.64	$2,837.87
Total valid votes		6,686	–	–	
Rejected		30	–		
Eligible voters / turnout		12,586	53.36	-3.17	
Source(s) Source: Manitoba. Chief Electoral Officer (2011). Statement of Votes for the 40th Provincial General Election, October 4, 2011 (PDF) (Report). Winnipeg: Elections Manitoba.

=== 2016 ===
2016 Manitoba general election
Party	Candidate	Votes	%	±%	Expenditures
Progressive Conservative	Derek Johnson	3,685	51.32	7.90	$27,224.05
Liberal	Jamal Abas	2,068	28.80	25.90	$8,951.25
New Democratic	Tom Nevakshonoff	1,428	19.89	-30.58	$19,403.09
Total valid votes		7,181	–	–	
Rejected		58	–		
Eligible voters / turnout		11,868	61.00	7.64	
Source(s) Source: Manitoba. Chief Electoral Officer (2016). Statement of Votes for the 41st Provincial General Election, April 19, 2016 (PDF) (Report). Winnipeg: Elections Manitoba. "Election Returns: 41st General Election". Elections Manitoba. 2016.

== Previous boundaries ==
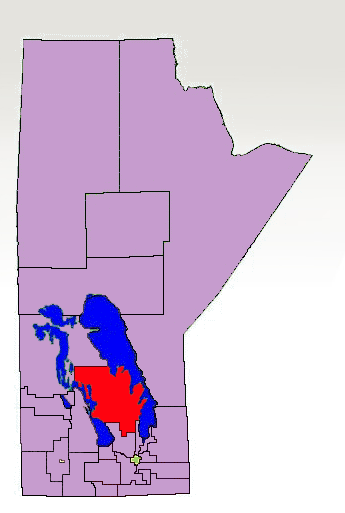
The 1998–2011 boundaries for Interlake highlighted in red.

== See also ==
- List of Manitoba provincial electoral districts
- Canadian provincial electoral districts
