= Bill Uruski =

Canadian politician (born 1942)

Member of the Manitoba Legislative Assembly for St. George
- In office June 25, 1969 – 1991
- Preceded by: Elman Guttormson

Personal details
- Born: July 27, 1942 (age 84) Poplarfield, Manitoba, Canada
- Party: New Democratic Party of Manitoba
- Profession: farmer, constable

Bill Uruski (born July 27, 1942) is a retired politician in Manitoba, Canada. He was a member of the Legislative Assembly of Manitoba from 1969 to 1990, and was a cabinet minister in the New Democratic Party governments of Edward Schreyer and Howard Pawley.

The son of Frank Uruski and Mary Shwaliuk, Uruski was born and educated in Poplarfield. He did not attend a university; however, he was a Royal Canadian Mounted Police constable from 1962 to 1967, and also worked as a farmer before entering public life. In 1964, he married Elaine Stonoga.

Uruski was first elected to the Manitoba legislature in the provincial election of 1969, defeating longtime Liberal MLA Elman Guttormson in the rural, mid-northern riding of St. George. The NDP formed government after this election, and Uruski served as a government backbencher for the next four years.

Uruski defeated Guttormson again in the 1973 provincial election, even though the Progressive Conservative Party declined to run a candidate for fear of vote-splitting with the Liberals. On August 29, 1973, he was named a Minister without Portfolio, responsible for the Manitoba Public Insurance Corporation and the Motor Vehicle Branch. On March 31, 1976, Premier Schreyer also assigned him responsibility for the Civil Service Act. On September 22, 1976, he was promoted to Minister of Municipal Affairs, still retaining responsibility for the CSA.

The NDP were defeated in the general election of 1977, and Uruski was re-elected by a reduced margin. There were some suggestions that he would run to succeed Schreyer as party leader in 1979, although these ultimately came to nothing.

Howard Pawley led the NDP to a majority government in the 1981 election, and Uruski was re-elected in the redistributed riding of Interlake. He returned to cabinet on November 30, 1981, as Minister of Agriculture. Until August 20, 1982, he also held responsibility for the Manitoba Public Insurance Corporation Act. Uruski attempted to develop his party's support base in rural Manitoba while serving as Agriculture Minister, though he had little success to this end. However, he had more success in opening Manitoba hog production to the American marketplace.

On September 21, 1987, Uruski was again made Minister of Municipal Affairs with responsibility for the MPIC. Early in 1988, the NDP were unexpectedly defeated in the legislature when backbench MLA Jim Walding voted with the opposition in an evenly divided house. Uruski was one of only twelve New Democrats re-elected in the election which followed, and formally stepped down from cabinet with the resignation of the Pawley government on May 9, 1988. The PCs, who won the most seats, formed a minority government with tacit NDP support against a Liberal opposition. He did not seek re-election in 1990.

Uruski was known as a promoter of Indigenous issues during his time in government (his riding had a large Indigenous population). In 1995, he was among the first to investigate alleged connections between the supposedly autonomous Independent Native Voice party and the Progressive Conservatives, after reports circulated that Interlake INV candidate Darryl Sutherland was running at the behest of local Tory interests with the intent of splitting the NDP vote. These allegations would become public three years later, and a public inquiry would rule that, in fact, local Tory organizers had persuaded Sutherland to run. In the 1999 provincial election, Uruski served as the NDP campaign manager in Interlake, supervising the successful campaign of party candidate Tom Nevakshonoff.

Uruski later became part of the Manitoba Rural Adaptation Council Incorporated. He also returned to farming and served on the board of the Manitoba Turkey Producers organization. In 2003, he represented the Poultry Welfare Coalition in a presentation to the Senate of Canada. He has criticized the tactics of the Monsanto Company in expanding their corporate base in the Canadian prairies. From 2006 to 2009, Uruski served as chairman of the Manitoba Cattle Enhancement Council.
