= Ken MacMaster =

Canadian politician

Member of the Legislative Assembly of Manitoba for Thompson
- In office 1977–1981
- Preceded by: Ken Dillen
- Succeeded by: Steve Ashton

Personal details
- Born: May 12, 1934 (age 91)
- Party: Progressive Conservative Party of Manitoba

Kenneth MacMaster (born May 12, 1934) is a politician in Manitoba, Canada. He was a Progressive Conservative member of the Legislative Assembly of Manitoba from 1977 to 1981, and served as a cabinet minister in the government of Sterling Lyon.

He was the son of John MacMaster and Jessie Campbell. In 1962, MacMaster married Lucille Rita Desjardins.

MacMaster first ran for public office in the federal election of 1965, as a New Democrat in the northern Manitoba riding of Churchill. He received 3306 votes, finishing third behind Tory Robert Simpson and Liberal Francis Bud Jobin. At the time of the election, he described his occupation as "mine mechanic".

He later left the NDP for the Progressive Conservatives, and was elected for the riding of Thompson in the provincial election of 1977, defeating incumbent New Democrat Ken Dillen by 916 votes. The Tories under Sterling Lyon won this election; as the sole Tory MLA from the province's north, MacMaster was appointed Minister of Northern Affairs on October 24, 1977, with responsibility for Renewable Resources and Transportation. He was relieved of the latter two responsibilities on October 20, 1978, and was named Minister of Labour and Manpower with responsibility for the Civil Service Commission. He was dropped as Northern Affairs minister on November 15, 1979, but kept his other responsibilities until the Lyon government was defeated in the election of 1981.

MacMaster was himself defeated in the 1981 election, losing to New Democrat Steve Ashton by 72 votes. He has not sought a return to political life since this time, but is very involved in community activities and projects in the Lac du Bonnet area. MacMaster is also a private consultant, providing services such as mediation, public speaking, and arbitration.
