= Progressive Conservative Party of Manitoba candidates in the 1988 Manitoba provincial election =

The Progressive Conservative Party of Manitoba fielded a full slate of 57 candidates in the 1988 provincial election, and won 25 seats to form a minority government. Many of the party's candidates have their own biography pages; information about others may be found here.

== Allan Yap (Burrows) ==
Yap was the sales manager for a prominent insurance company, and was involved in the Malaysia Singapore Association of Manitoba. He first campaigned for the Manitoba legislature in the 1981 provincial election at age forty, as a candidate of the Progressive Party.

He is not to be confused with the Vancouver businessman of the same name.

Electoral record
| Election | Division | Party | Votes | % | Place | Winner |
|---|---|---|---|---|---|---|
| 1981 provincial | St. Norbert | Progressive | 216 | | 4/4 | Gerry Mercier, Progressive Conservative |
| 1990 provincial | Burrows | Progressive Conservative | 1,040 | 14.12 | 3/5 | William Chornopyski, Liberal |
