= Minister of Urban Affairs (Manitoba) =

The Minister of Urban Affairs is a former cabinet position in Manitoba, Canada.

The position was created in the early 1970s, incorporating responsibilities that had previously been held by the Minister of Municipal Affairs. It was discontinued by the government of Gary Doer in 1999.

== List of ministers of urban affairs ==
Name	Party	Took office	Left office
Sidney Green (*)	New Democratic Party	September 9, 1971	March 3, 1972
Sidney Green	New Democratic Party	July 21, 1972	February 15, 1973
Ben Hanuschak	New Democratic Party	February 15, 1973	August 29, 1973
Saul Miller	New Democratic Party	August 29, 1973	January 28, 1974
Edward Schreyer	New Democratic Party	January 28, 1974	December 23, 1974
Saul Miller	New Democratic Party	December 23, 1974	October 24, 1977
Gerald Mercier (*)	Progressive Conservative	October 24, 1977	November 30, 1981
Eugene Kostyra	New Democratic Party	November 30, 1981	November 4, 1983
Mary Beth Dolin	New Democratic Party	November 4, 1983	January 30, 1985
Laurent Desjardins	New Democratic Party	January 30, 1985	April 17, 1986
Gary Doer	New Democratic Party	April 17, 1986	May 9, 1988
Gerald Ducharme	Progressive Conservative	May 9, 1988	February 5, 1991
James Ernst	Progressive Conservative	February 5, 1991	September 10, 1993
Linda McIntosh (*)	Progressive Conservative	September 10, 1993	May 9, 1995
Jack Reimer	Progressive Conservative	May 9, 1995	October 5, 1999

- Note: From 1966 to 1968, Thelma Forbes was designated as Minister of Urban Development and Municipal Affairs.
- From 1971 to 1972, Sidney Green served as Minister responsible for Urban Affairs. This was not a full cabinet portfolio, although Green was already a member of cabinet by virtue of being Minister of Mines, Resources and Environmental Management.
- From 1978 to 1979, Gerald Mercier was designated as Minister of Municipal and Urban Affairs.
- Linda McIntosh was designated as Minister of Urban Affairs and Housing.

Sources: ,
