= Mary Beth Dolin =

Canadian politician (1936–1985)

Member of the Legislative Assembly of Manitoba for Kildonan
- In office November 17, 1981 – April 9, 1985
- Preceded by: Peter Fox
- Succeeded by: Marty Dolin

Personal details
- Born: Mary Elisabeth Brugger; January 25, 1936 Fond du Lac, Wisconsin, U.S.
- Died: April 9, 1985 (aged 49) Winnipeg, Manitoba, Canada
- Party: New Democratic Party of Manitoba
- Spouse: Marty Dolin
- Education: Webster College; Saint Louis University Washington University in St. Louis; University of Manitoba
- Profession: educator

Mary Elisabeth Dolin (née Brugger; January 25, 1936 – April 9, 1985) was an American-born Canadian politician in Manitoba, Canada. She was elected to the Legislative Assembly of Manitoba in 1981 as a New Democrat, and was a cabinet minister in the government of Howard Pawley prior to her death. She also had the married names of Higgins from 1957 to 1966 and Andrus from 1966 to 1979.

Born Mary Elisabeth Brugger in Fond du Lac, Wisconsin, she was educated at Webster College, Saint Louis University, Washington University in St. Louis and the University of Manitoba. She came to Canada with her husband and children in 1970. She held a number of degrees, including a Bachelor of Education, and was a teacher and school administrator before entering political life. She served as a member of the Manitoba Teachers' Society, as well as the Manitoba Association of Rights and Liberties.

Dolin was elected to the Manitoba legislature in the 1981 provincial election in the north-end Winnipeg riding of Kildonan, defeating her Progressive Conservative opponent by more than 2,000 votes. On July 19, 1982, she was named Manitoba Minister of Labour and Manpower, with responsibility for the Civil Service Act, the Civil Service Superannuation Act, the Pension Benefits Act and the Public Servants Insurance Act, and well as the minister responsible for the Status of Women. Following a cabinet shuffle on November 4, 1983, she retained the Labour portfolio and the Status of Women responsibility, while also becoming the Minister of Urban Affairs. As Labour Minister, Dolin conducted the final pension review in Manitoba before 2004.

== Death and legacy ==
She left cabinet on January 30, 1985 following her diagnosis of breast cancer. She died shortly thereafter. Her husband, Marty Dolin, was elected in a 1985 by-election held in the Kildonan riding following her death.

The Mary Beth Dolin Meritorious Fire Service Medal was established in her honour in 1988.
