= Minister responsible for the Civil Service (Manitoba) =

Canadian provincial cabinet minister

Minister responsible for the Public Service Commission
- Incumbent; Adrien Sala
- Manitoba Public Service Commission
- Member of: Executive Council of Manitoba
- Constituting instrument: The Civil Service Act; The Public Service Act

The Minister responsible for the Public Service Commission is the Manitoba cabinet minister responsible for the Public Service.

The Manitoba Public Service Commission (PSC; French: Commission de la fonction publique) is the independent and impartial department responsible for leading effective management of human resource and labour relations in the provincial government and for representing the public interest through the administration of Manitoba's Public Service Act and regulations. The PSC administers all recruitment policy and employment regulation related to public servants of the Manitoba government, and is the body responsible for the investigation and discipline of government employee misconduct.

The PSC is headed by the Public Service Commissioner.

The current Minister responsible for the Public Service Commission is Adrien Sala, who is also the Minister of Finance. The Deputy Minister of the Public Service Commission, is also known as the Public Service Commissioner.

== Overview ==
The Civil Service Act is the primary legislative framework for human-resource management in Manitoba's government. Under the Act, "Conditions of Employment Regulation" sets out the terms and conditions of employment for provincial civil servants outside of a bargaining unit. The Manitoba Human Rights Code is the principle legislation prohibiting unreasonable discrimination in Manitoba.

The Civil Service Board is composed of 6 citizen members appointed by the Lieutenant-Governor-in-Council, as well as the presiding Deputy Minister of the Civil Service Commission, who is also known as the Civil Service Commissioner. The Board is responsible for delegating authority to employees of the CSC; for providing advice to the Minister responsible for the Civil Service Commission on issues related to human-resource management, programming, and procedures; for ensuring that all programming and policy stipulated in the Civil Service Act is administered correctly; and for presiding as a quasi-judicial appeals tribunal over cases related to employee selection, reclassification, and conflict of interest.

=== Previous branches ===
Branches and divisions that have reported directly to the Civil Service Commission include:

- Personnel Administration Branch (1969–79)
- Personnel Services Division (1979–85)
- Human Resource Management Division (1985–2006)
- Administrative Services Division (1988–2009)
- Personnel Policy and Audit Division (1978–88)
- Staff Relations Branch (1969–79)
- Labour Relations Division (1979–2000; transferred to the Department of Finance)

== History ==
=== Department of the Civil Service ===
The Department of the Civil Service was established in 1885 through the Manitoba Civil Service Act to administer all recruitment policy- and employment regulation-related to people working for the Manitoba government. The act also established the department as the body responsible for the investigation and discipline of government employee misconduct.

The Department administered authority over all government employees with the exception of deputy ministers, who were appointed by and placed under the control of the Lieutenant-Governor-in-Council. From its creation, the Department was structured as 2 divisions: one responsible for administering government employees stationed in Winnipeg; and the other responsible for government employees working outside of Winnipeg. Each division was responsible for providing direction, administering policy, and implementing regulation related to the designations, duties, promotions, and salaries of government employees falling under its jurisdiction. The department also set regulations concerning the age limits, educational standards, and the required experience necessary for employment with Manitoba's civil service.

The Department of the Civil Service was headed by a Civil Service Board, which was composed of 3 deputy ministers appointed by the Lieutenant-Governor-in-Council. The Board was responsible for examining all applicable candidates for employment in the civil service. It also acted as a disciplinary council, responsible for investigating all complaints of employee misconduct. In 1918, following accusations of political partisanship, the Department was restructured as a commission and became known as the Civil Service Commission.

=== Civil Service Commission ===
The Civil Service Commission was established in 1918 by the Civil Service Commission Act, assuming all functions and responsibilities held by the former Department of the Civil Service.

In 1973, Labour Minister Russell Paulley was given additional responsibilities as Minister responsible for the Civil Service Act, Minister responsible for the Civil Service Superannuation Act, and Minister responsible for the Public Servants Insurance Act. Since then, the Executive Council of Manitoba has included a minister or ministers responsible for the provincial civil service. This position is not a full cabinet portfolio, and has always been held by ministers with other cabinet responsibilities.

In 1976, Paulley was given further responsibilities as Minister responsible for the Pension Benefits Act, while Bill Uruski took over responsibilities for the Civil Service Act. (The Canadian Parliamentary Guide indicates that Paulley retained responsibilities for the Administration of the Civil Service Act even after Uruski's appointment, but this may be an error.) However, the responsibilities would be re-united under a single minister the next year, and Ken MacMaster took office under the title 'Minister responsible for the Civil Service Commission' in 1978.

In 1981, Vic Schroeder took office as 'Minister responsible for the Civil Service Commission' and Minister responsible for the Civil Service Superannuation Board. The original four ministerial titles would resume in 1982. Since then, the CSC has maintained programs related to workplace diversity and inclusion, as well as employee assistance and counselling. In 1983, the position relating to the Pension Benefits Act were dropped and replaced with the designation, Minister responsible for the Civil Service Special Supplementary Severance Benefit Act.

In 1999, the position was simplified as Minister responsible for the Civil Service.

In 2010, all human-resource services administered throughout the Government of Manitoba were restructured and centralized under the direct authority and administration of the Civil Service Commission.

The current Minister responsible for the Civil Service Commission, James Teitsma, is also Manitoba's Minister of Minister of Consumer Protection and Government Services.

== List of ministers responsible for the Manitoba Civil Service ==
Name	Minister responsible for	Party	Took office	Left office
Russell Paulley	…the Civil Service Act; …the Civil Service Superannuation Act; …the Public Servants Insurance Act; …the Pension Benefits Act (1976)	New Democratic Party	August 29, 1973	October 24, 1977
Bill Uruski	…the Civil Service Act*	New Democratic Party	March 31, 1976	October 24, 1977
Norma Price	…the Civil Service Commission	Progressive Conservative	October 24, 1977	October 20, 1978
Ken MacMaster	…the Civil Service Commission	Progressive Conservative	October 20, 1978	November 30, 1981
Victor Schroeder	…the Civil Service Commission; …the Civil Service Superannuation Board	New Democratic Party	November 30, 1981	July 19, 1982
Mary Beth Dolin	…the Civil Service Act; …the Civil Service Superannuation Act; …the Public Servants Insurance Act; …the Pension Benefits Act	New Democratic Party	July 19, 1982	November 4, 1983
Victor Schroeder	…the Civil Service Act; …the Civil Service Superannuation Act; …the Public Servants Insurance Act; …the Civil Service Special Supplementary Severance Benefit Act	New Democratic Party	November 4, 1983	January 30, 1985
Alvin Mackling	…the Civil Service Act; …the Civil Service Superannuation Act; …the Public Servants Insurance Act; …the Civil Service Special Supplementary Severance Benefit Act	New Democratic Party	January 30, 1985	April 17, 1986
Eugene Kostyra	…the Civil Service Act; …the Civil Service Superannuation Act; …the Public Servants Insurance Act; …the Civil Service Special Supplementary Severance Benefit Act	New Democratic Party	April 17, 1986	May 9, 1988
Edward Connery	…the Civil Service Act; …the Civil Service Superannuation Act; …the Public Servants Insurance Act; …the Civil Service Special Supplementary Severance Benefit Act	Progressive Conservative	May 9, 1988	April 21, 1989
Gerrie Hammond	…the Civil Service Act; …the Civil Service Superannuation Act; …the Public Servants Insurance Act; …the Civil Service Special Supplementary Severance Benefit Act	Progressive Conservative	April 21, 1989	September 11, 1990
Darren Praznik	…the Civil Service Act; …the Civil Service Superannuation Act; …the Public Servants Insurance Act; …the Civil Service Special Supplementary Severance Benefit Act	Progressive Conservative	September 11, 1990	May 9, 1995
Vic Toews	…the Civil Service Act; …the Civil Service Superannuation Act; …the Public Servants Insurance Act; …the Civil Service Special Supplementary Severance Benefit Act	Progressive Conservative	May 9, 1995	January 6, 1997
Harold Gilleshammer	…the Civil Service Act; …the Civil Service Superannuation Act; …the Public Servants Insurance Act; …the Civil Service Special Supplementary Severance Benefit Act	Progressive Conservative	January 6, 1997	February 5, 1999
Mike Radcliffe	…the Civil Service	Progressive Conservative	February 5, 1999	October 5, 1999
Becky Barrett	…the Civil Service	New Democratic Party	October 5, 1999	January 17, 2001
Gregory Selinger	…the Civil Service	New Democratic Party	January 17, 2001	September 14, 2009
Cameron Friesen	…the Civil Service	Progressive Conservative	May 3, 2016	August 1, 2018
Scott Fielding	…the Civil Service	Progressive Conservative	August 1, 2018	October 23, 2019
Reg Helwer	…the Civil Service; …the Public Service	Progressive Conservative	October 23, 2019	January 30, 2023
James Teitsma	…the Public Service	Progressive Conservative	January 30, 2023	October 18, 2023
Adrien Sala	…the Public Service	New Democratic Party	October 18, 2023	
* Responsible for the Civil Service Act only. The Canadian Parliamentary Guide indicates that Paulley retained responsibilities for the Administration of the Civil Service Act even after Uruski's appointment, but this may be an error.
