= Henry Nelson Carroll =

Canadian politician (1937–2015)

Member of the Legislative Assembly of Manitoba for Brandon West
- In office November 17, 1981 – March 18, 1986
- Preceded by: Edward McGill
- Succeeded by: James McCrae

Personal details
- Born: Henry Nathan Kazakevich; December 21, 1937 Saint Boniface, Manitoba
- Died: June 19, 2015 (aged 77) Brandon, Manitoba, Canada
- Party: Reform
- Other political affiliations: Independent (after 1982); New Democratic (until 1982); Liberal (before 1969)
- Spouse: Barbara Gail Dunlop (m. 1982)
- Children: 2
- Education: University of Manitoba
- Occupation: Lawyer, politician

Henry Nelson Carroll (December 21, 1937 – June 19, 2015) was a Canadian lawyer and politician. He served as a member of the Legislative Assembly of Manitoba from 1981 to 1986, initially as a New Democrat but subsequently as an independent.

Carroll was educated at the University of Manitoba, and practiced as a lawyer after being called to the bar in 1964. He first ran for the provincial legislature in the election of 1973 as a New Democrat, finishing second to Progressive Conservative Edward McGill in Brandon West. He ran for the seat again in the provincial election of 1977, with the same result.

McGill did not seek re-election in the provincial election of 1981, and Carroll was able to take the seat on his third try, defeating Tory candidate John Allen by about 400 votes. The NDP under Howard Pawley won a majority government in this election, and Carroll entered the legislature as a government backbencher.

Soon after, he announced his decision to leave the NDP (on August 19, 1982) and subsequently opposed the Pawley government's intentions to re-entrench French language services in provincial law. He did not seek re-election in 1986.

In the federal election of 1988, Carroll ran as a candidate of the Reform Party in the riding of Brandon—Souris. He finished in fourth place, well behind victorious Progressive Conservative candidate Lee Clark. He did not attempt to re-enter provincial or federal politics since then.

Carroll was disbarred as a lawyer in Brandon in 2008. He died on June 19, 2015, at the age of 77.
