= Gerrie Hammond =

Canadian politician

Geraldine Rose "Gerrie" Hammond (died November 1, 1992) was a politician in Manitoba, Canada. She was a member of the Legislative Assembly of Manitoba from 1981 to 1990, and a cabinet minister in the Progressive Conservative government of Gary Filmon from 1988 to 1990.

Born Geraldine Rose McLean in Winnipeg, she was the daughter of George Saunders Foreman McLean and Harriet Rose Anderso and was educated in Winnipeg. She married Robert Douglas Hammond. Before entering provincial politics, Hammond served as a trustee on the St. James-Assiniboia School Division from 1977 to 1980. Hammond was an unsuccessful candidate for a seat in the provincial assembly in 1977 and 1980. She was first elected to the Manitoba legislature in the provincial election of 1981, defeating NDP candidate Lee Monk by nearly 3000 votes in the west-Winnipeg riding of Kirkfield Park. In the 1986 election, she was re-elected by an even greater margin. The NDP won both of these elections, and Hammond sat as a member of the official opposition.

In the provincial election of 1988, Hammond faced a strong challenge from Liberal candidate Irene Friesen, retaining her seat by only 255 votes. The Progressive Conservatives were nonetheless able to form a minority government after this election, and on April 21, 1989, Hammond was named as Minister of Labour, with responsibility for the Status of Women, the Civil Service Act, the Civil Service Superannuation Act, the Civil Service Special Supplementary Severance Benefit Act, the Public Servants Insurance Act and the Workers Compensation Act (in matters relating to Worker Advisers). Despite this mid-term cabinet promotion, Hammond did not seek re-election in 1990. She died of cancer in 1992.

There is currently a Gerrie Hammond Memorial Award of Promise offered by the Council of Women of Winnipeg in her honour, and a Gerrie Hammond bursary offered by the University of Manitoba to single women in financial need.

As Minister of Labour, Hammond was accused by the opposition of patronage hiring outside of the province's Civil Service Act. She also supported ending the province's rules for "final offer selection", in which an independent mediator would decide between the claims of labour and management.
