= Seven Oaks (electoral district) =

Defunct provincial electoral district in Manitoba, Canada

Coordinates: 49.935°N 97.115°W

Seven Oaks is a former provincial electoral district of Manitoba, Canada. It was created in 1956, and eliminated in 1989.

The riding was located in north-end Winnipeg, and was a safe seat for the Cooperative Commonwealth Federation and New Democratic Party for most of its history.

== Members of the Legislative Assembly ==
Name	Party	Took office	Left office
Arthur Wright	CCF	1958	1961
	NDP	1961	1966
Saul Miller	NDP	1966	1981
Eugene Kostyra	NDP	1981	1988
Mark Minenko	Lib	1988	1990

== Election results ==
1986 Manitoba general election
Party	Candidate	Votes	%	±%
New Democratic	Eugene Kostyra	5,158	64.71	+8.73
Progressive Conservative	George Finkle	1,841	23.10	-0.69
Liberal	Wayne Glowacki	907	11.38	+6.07
Communist	Harold Dyck	65	0.82	n/a
Turnout		7,988	63.36	-8.74
New Democratic hold		Swing		+4.71
Source: Elections Manitoba

1988 Manitoba general election
Party	Candidate	Votes	%	±%
Liberal	Mark Minenko	3,885	42.81	+31.43
New Democratic	Eugene Kostyra	3,553	39.16	-25.55
Progressive Conservative	George Finkle	1,636	18.03	-5.07
Total valid votes		9,074	100.00	
Rejected ballots		17		
Turnout		9,091	72.37	+9.01
Eligible voters		12,561		
Liberal gain from New Democratic		Swing		+28.49
Source: Elections Manitoba

== See also ==
- List of Manitoba provincial electoral districts
- Canadian provincial electoral districts
