= Tom Nevakshonoff =

Canadian politician (born 1958)

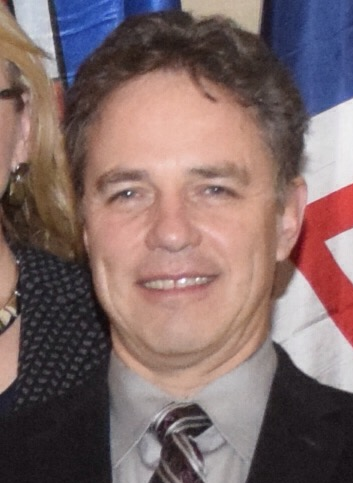

Member of the Legislative Assembly of Manitoba for Interlake
- In office September 21, 1999 – April 19, 2016
- Preceded by: Clif Evans
- Succeeded by: Derek Johnson

Member of Rural Municipality of Fisher Council
- Incumbent
- Assumed office October 24, 2018

Personal details
- Born: December 22, 1958 (age 67) Winnipeg, Manitoba
- Party: New Democratic
- Spouse: Rozanne Imlah (m. 2000)
- Education: Carleton University (BA); Fisher Branch Collegiate Institute

Thomas George Nevakshonoff (born December 22, 1958) is a former politician in Manitoba, Canada. He served as a member of the Manitoba legislature, prior to his defeat in 2016.

Nevakshonoff was born in Winnipeg, Manitoba. He grew up in Poplarfield and Fisher Branch, Manitoba. He graduated from the Fisher Branch Collegiate Institute in 1977. He then spent eighteen years working in Canada's oilfields.

In 1987, Nevakshonoff graduated from Carleton University in Ottawa with a Bachelor of Arts degree in East European Studies. He is from a Doukhobor family that moved to Canada in 1899. Nevakshonoff travelled to Russia in 1991 where he was employed by Canadian companies interested in the Russian oil and gas industries. In 1992, he was commissioned by the Canadian Embassy in Russia to write a petroleum sector study.

He returned to Canada and on his father's retirement replaced his father as co-owner of the family business, Aberdeen Lodge, a family-owned lodge located just south of Flin Flon. He married Rozanne Imlah in 2000.

Nevakshonoff was elected to the Manitoba legislature as a New Democrat in the provincial election of 1999, defeating Progressive Conservative Betty Green by 3,809 votes to 3,260 in the riding of Interlake.

In 2003, he supported Bill Blaikie's campaign to become leader of the federal New Democratic Party.

Nevakshonoff was re-elected in the 2003 election, defeating Betty Green again by a wider margin. He was returned again in the 2007 election. He is the chair of the NDP's Legislative Review Committee of the NDP Caucus and the Standing Committee of Agriculture of the Legislative Assembly. He is also the Legislative Assistant to the Minister of Conservation and the Minister of Infrastructure and Transportation. In 2011, he was named deputy speaker. Nevakshonoff was elected again in 2011.

His great-grandfather Henry Mabb and Frederick Bird, another ancestor, both served in the Manitoba assembly.
