= Norma Price =

Canadian politician

Norma Lorraine Price (August 19, 1920 – February 24, 2008) was a politician in Manitoba, Canada. She was born in Winnipeg, Manitoba, and was a Progressive Conservative member of the Manitoba Legislature from 1977 to 1981, and served as a cabinet minister in the government of Sterling Lyon.

Born Norma Lorraine Killeen, the daughter of Clement A. Killeen and Aurora Martel, she was educated at Immaculate Conception School and St. Mary's Academy. She married Howard Wesley Isidor, son of Mrs. A. Baldwin on February 1, 1940. She divorced Howard on 14 January 1959. Married James Percy Price sometime before 1963. She subsequently married John Heeney in about 1982, and remained married with him for 26 years until her death. She began work at the Viscount Gort Hotel in Winnipeg, later becoming a general manager. She subsequently became sales and public relations manager for the International Inn. During the 1970s, she worked as an underwriter for the Sun Life Assurance Company.

Price first ran for the Manitoba legislature in the provincial election of 1973, losing to Liberal Stephen Patrick by 796 votes in the west-end Winnipeg riding of Assiniboia. Four years later, in the 1977 election, she defeated Patrick by over 3,500 votes as the Tories formed government under Lyon.

On October 24, 1977, Price was appointed Minister of Labour with responsibility for the Civil Service Act, the Civil Service Superannuation Act, the Public Servants Insurance Act and the Pension Benefits Act. On October 20, 1978, she was reassigned as the Minister of Tourism and Cultural Affairs on October 20, 1978, and as Minister of Cultural Affairs and Historical Resources on December 7, 1979.

She did not run for re-election in 1981, and did not sought a return to politics since that time. She married John Edward Heeney a year later.

She was one of the first inductees into the Women Business Owners of Manitoba Hall of Fame.

She died at the Victoria General Hospital in Winnipeg at the age of 87.
