= Mark Minenko =

Canadian politician

Member of the Legislative Assembly of Manitoba for Seven Oaks
- In office April 26, 1988 – September 11, 1990
- Preceded by: Eugene Kostyra
- Succeeded by: Riding dissolved

Personal details
- Born: March 29, 1957 (age 69) New York City, U.S.
- Party: Liberal
- Other political affiliations: Manitoba Liberal
- Education: University of Winnipeg; University of Manitoba

Mark Minenko (born March 29, 1957) is a Canadian politician. He was a member of the Legislative Assembly of Manitoba from 1988 to 1990, representing the Winnipeg riding of Seven Oaks for the Manitoba Liberal Party.

== Early years and education ==
He was born in New York City. Minenko's father was the Very Rev. Tymofiy Minenko, a Ukrainian-born priest in the Ukrainian Orthodox Church; his mother was Anastasia Krywonos. He was raised in Winnipeg, and was educated at the University of Winnipeg and the University of Manitoba. He worked as a lawyer, and also joined the Canadian Forces Medical Services in 1976, eventually reaching the rank of captain. He was awarded the Canada Forces Decoration in 1988.

== Political career ==
In 1981, Minenko worked as an assistant to MLA June Westbury, who was at the time the only Liberal representative in the provincial legislature.

Minenko first ran for provincial office in the election of 1988, scoring an upset victory over outgoing New Democratic Finance Minister Eugene Kostyra in Seven Oaks. Minenko won the election by 332 votes at a time when provincial support for the NDP was at its lowest ebb since the 1960s. He was named as Deputy Speaker on July 21, 1988, but resigned on May 18, 1989.

In the provincial election of 1990, redistribution forced him to run in the riding of St. Johns against another incumbent, New Democrat Judy Wasylycia-Leis. He lost, by almost two thousand votes, amid a general decline in support for the Liberal Party.

Minenko later became active in the Ukrainian Canadian Congress and has sought a formal apology from the federal government for the detainment of Ukrainians in concentration camps during the First World War. He also continued his education at the University of Alberta, working towards a Master of Laws degree.

On March 27, 2025, he was named as the Liberal Party of Canada candidate for Edmonton Riverbend, Alberta.

At the time of the 2025 Canadian federal election, he lived in Edmonton.

== Election results ==
2025 Canadian federal election: Edmonton Riverbend
| Party | Candidate | Votes | % | ±% | Expenditures |
|---|---|---|---|---|---|
| Conservative | Matt Jeneroux | 30,343 | 50.24 | +4.80 | $101,366.68 |
| Liberal | Mark Minenko | 27,075 | 44.83 | +19.90 | $38,315.13 |
| New Democratic | Susan Cake | 2,563 | 4.24 | –20.19 | $5,691.57 |
| People's | Dwayne Dudiak | 410 | 0.68 | –3.34 | $36.00 |
| Total valid votes/expense limit | | 60,391 | 99.29 | – | $131,098.97 |
| Total rejected ballots | | 431 | 0.71 | +0.16 | |
| Turnout | | 60,822 | 70.43 | +4.20 | |
| Eligible voters | | 86,361 | | | |
| Conservative notional hold | | Swing | | –7.54 | |
Source: Elections Canada

1988 Manitoba general election: Seven Oaks
| Party | Candidate | Votes | % | ±% |
|---|---|---|---|---|
| Liberal | Mark Minenko | 3,885 | 42.81 | +31.43 |
| New Democratic | Eugene Kostyra | 3,553 | 39.16 | -25.55 |
| Progressive Conservative | George Finkle | 1,636 | 18.03 | -5.07 |
| Total valid votes | | 9,074 | 100.00 | |
| Rejected ballots | | 17 | | |
| Turnout | | 9,091 | 72.37 | +9.01 |
| Eligible voters | | 12,561 | | |
| Liberal gain from New Democratic | | Swing | | +28.49 |
Source: Elections Manitoba
