= Arthur E. Wright =

Canadian politician

Arthur Edgar Wright (November 8, 1907 – May 19, 1977) was a politician in Manitoba, Canada. He was a member of the Legislative Assembly of Manitoba from 1958 to 1966, originally for the Cooperative Commonwealth Federation and later for its successor party, the New Democratic Party.

The son of Arthur L. Wright and Mary Ruffles, Wright was born and educated in Winnipeg, and worked as a supervisor for the mechanical departure of the Canadian National Railway. In 1931, he married Pearl Rosina Clegg. Wright was chairman of the Public Works department in the city of West Kildonan from 1946 to 1954, and served as its mayor from 1954 to 1958.

He was first elected to the Manitoba legislature in the 1958 provincial election, winning an easy victory in the north-end Winnipeg riding of Seven Oaks. He was returned by an equally significant margin the 1959 election, and fended off a more serious challenge from Progressive Conservative candidate Jack Chapman in the election of 1962. He did not run again in 1966.

Wright died in Winnipeg at the age of 69 of cancer.

There are currently Arthur E. Wright schools in California and Winnipeg. The Winnipeg school was named after Wright but the California school, in Las Virgenes Unified School District, was named after its founder, Arthur Edward Wright.
