= Marty Dolin =

Canadian politician (1939–2018)

Member of the Legislative Assembly of Manitoba for Kildonan
- In office October 1, 1985 – April 26, 1988
- Preceded by: Mary Beth Dolin
- Succeeded by: Gulzar Singh Cheema

Personal details
- Born: June 15, 1939 New York City, U.S.
- Died: February 14, 2018 (aged 78) Winnipeg, Manitoba, Canada
- Party: New Democratic
- Spouse: Mary Beth Dolin (died 1985)
- Education: City College of New York; University of the Americas; Dalhousie University

Martin Mathew Dolin (June 15, 1939 – February 14, 2018) was an American-born Canadian politician in Manitoba, Canada. He was a member of the Legislative Assembly of Manitoba from 1985 to 1988, representing the north-end Winnipeg riding of Kildonan as a member of the New Democratic Party of Manitoba.

== Education ==
Dolin was educated at City College of New York, the University of the Americas in Mexico, and Dalhousie University in Nova Scotia.

== Political career ==
In the 1972 Canadian federal election, he ran for the New Democratic Party in Halifax, finishing third against Progressive Conservative leader Robert Stanfield and Liberal Terry McGrath. At the time, Dolin was employed as an executive director for family services.

He also ran for the New Democratic Party of Nova Scotia in the provincial election of 1974, finishing third against Liberal Premier Gerald Regan in the riding of Halifax Needham.

Dolin moved to Manitoba, where his wife Mary Beth Dolin served as a cabinet minister in the government of Howard Pawley in the early 1980s. Following Mary Beth's death in 1985, Marty successfully ran to succeed her as the MLA for Kildonan, defeating Tory Bev Rayburn by over 1,000 votes. He was re-elected over Rayburn by a greater margin in the 1986 provincial election, though he was not appointed to Pawley's cabinet.

In the 1988 election, Dolin finished third in a close race against Progressive Conservative John Baluta and winning Liberal Gulzar Singh Cheema. He retired from public office and never attempted a political comeback.

=== Outside of politics ===
In 1994, he published a work entitled Education in a Multicultural Society.

After leaving politics, Dolin was a member of the Canadian Council for Refugees, the Interfaith Immigration Council (he himself was Jewish), and the Social Planning Council of Winnipeg. He retired in June 2011 as head of Welcome Place, Manitoba's largest refugee-settlement agency. In 2012, he was presented with the Queen Elizabeth II Diamond Jubilee Medal for his public service for refugees.

== Electoral record ==
Manitoba provincial by-election, October 1, 1985: Kildonan
Party	Candidate	Votes	%	±%
New Democratic	Marty Dolin	4,332	47.53%	-7.58%
Progressive Conservative	Bev Rayburn	3,248	35.64%	-0.69%
Liberal	Chris Guly	988	10.84%	4.72%
Progressive	Ben Hanuschak	546	5.99%	3.56%
Total		9,114	–	–
Eligible voters / Turnout		N/A	–	–
Rejected		N/A	–	–
Source(s) Source:Manitoba. Chief Electoral Officer (1999). Statement of Votes for the 37th Provincial General Election, September 21, 1999 (PDF) (Report). Winnipeg: Elections Manitoba. pp. 211–277.

1972 Canadian federal election: Halifax
Party	Candidate	Votes	%	±%
Progressive Conservative	Robert Stanfield	17,966	56.04	-4.29
Liberal	Terry McGrath	10,039	31.31	-4.31
New Democratic	Marty Dolin	3,936	12.28	+8.23
Independent	Tony Seed	121	0.38	
Total valid votes		32,062	100.00	
Turnout			74.43	
Eligible voters		43,078		
Progressive Conservative hold		Swing		+0.01
