= Edward McGill =

Canadian politician

Edward Robert McGill (September 21, 1912 in Vancouver, British Columbia – December 3, 1996) was a politician in Manitoba, Canada. He was a Progressive Conservative member of the Legislative Assembly of Manitoba from 1969 to 1981, and was a cabinet minister in the government of Sterling Lyon.

McGill was raised in Brandon, Manitoba, and was educated at Queen's University in Kingston, Ontario. He worked for Inco Steel from 1933 to 1939. He served in the Royal Canadian Air Force from 1940 to 1945, and later managed the Brandon Flying Club. McGill married Marguerite Eve Shaw in 1942. He served as a director of the Brandon General Hospital, and was a member of the Brandon Police Commission.

He was first elected to the Manitoba legislature in the provincial election of 1969, defeating New Democrat James Skinner by 504 votes. He was re-elected over New Democrat Henry Carroll by just over 1,000 votes in the 1973 election, and again in the 1977 election.

The Progressive Conservatives formed government in 1977, and on October 24 of that year McGill was appointed Consumer, Corporate and Internal Services and Minister of Cooperative Development, with responsibility for the Manitoba Telephone System and Communications and the Manitoba Lotteries Act. After a reshuffling on October 20, 1978, he retained his portfolios and was given responsibility for the Manitoba Telephone System, Manitoba Forestry Resources Limited and the Manitoba Public Insurance Corporation.

On November 15, 1979, McGill stepped down to the position of Minister without Portfolio. He did not seek re-election in 1981, and has not sought a return to politics since that time.

In the legislature, his mild demeanour earned him the ironic nickname "Mad Dog McGill". Gary Doer described him as "gentlemanly" following his death in 1996. He died in Brandon at the age of 84.

McGill managed the Brandon airport for 25 years and it was renamed McGill Field in 1971 in his honour.
