= List of Manitoba CCF/NDP members =

This articles lists Wikipedia articles about members of the Manitoba Co-operative Commonwealth Federation (CCF), a social democratic political party in Manitoba, Canada, and its successor, the Manitoba New Democratic Party (NDP).

== List by date of election ==
=== Elected before 1936 ===
- John Queen; Winnipeg 1920-1922 (Social Democratic Party) 1922-1927 (Independent Workers), 1927-1932-1936 (Independent Labour), 1936-1941 (CCF) (ran, CCF lost), former Mayor of Winnipeg
- William Ivens; Winnipeg 1920-1922 (Dominion Labour Party), 1922-1927-1932-1936 (Independent Labour), 1936 (ran as CCF, lost)
- Seymour Farmer; Winnipeg 1922-1927-1932-1936 (Independent Labour),1936-1941-1945-1949 (CCF) (retired, Ridings Boundaries Changed)
- Harold Lawrence; St. Boniface 1932-1936 (Independent Labour), 1936-1941 (CCF)
- Marcus Hyman; Winnipeg 1932-1936 (Independent Labour), 1936-1938 (CCF) (died)

=== 1936 general election ===
The CCF won a total of seven seats in the 1936 general election. Four CCF MLAs had previously sat as Independent Labour MLAs, three CCFers were elected for the first time:

- James Aiken - Assiniboia 1936–1941
- Herbert Sulkers - St. Clements 1936-1941 (ran, CCF lost)
- Joseph Wawrykow - Gimli 1936-1941-1945 (retired, CCF lost)

=== 1941 general election ===
The CCF won three seats in the 1941 election.

- Morris Gray - Winnipeg 1941–1945–1949, Winnipeg North 1949–1953–1958, Inkster 1958-1959-1962-1966 (retired, NDP won)

=== 1943 by-elections ===
The CCF won two additional seats in by-elections in 1943:

- Beresford Richards - The Pas 1943by-1945-1949 (*kicked out CCF for Communist leanings, but let back in 1945, kicked out again in 1949, CCF lost)
- Dwight Johnson - Brandon 1943by-1945 (*kicked out of the CCF, CCF lost)

=== 1945 general election ===
The CCF won nine seats in the 1945 election.

- Ernest Draffin - Assiniboia 1945-1949 (ran, CCF lost)
- Michael Sawchuk - Ethelbert 1945-1949 (did not run, CCF lost)
- Edwin Hansford - St. Boniface 1945-1949-1953 (retired, CCF lost)
- Wilbert Doneleyko - St. Clements 1945-1949 (kicked out of the CCF, CCF lost)
- George Olive - Springfield 1945–1949, Kildonan-Transcona 1949-1953 (retired, CCF won)
- Lloyd Stinson - Winnipeg 1945–1949, Winnipeg South(4) 1949–1953–1958, Osborne 1958-1959 (ran, CCF lost)
- Donovan Swailes - Winnipeg 1945–1949–1953, Winnipeg Centre 1953–1958, Assiniboia 1958-1959 (ran, CCF lost)

=== 1949 general election ===
The CCF won seven seats in the 1949 election.

- Gordon Fines - Winnipeg 1949-1953 (ran, CCF lost)
- John Hawryluk - Winnipeg North 1949–1953–1958, Burrows 1958-1959-1962 (ran, NDP lost)

=== 1953 general election ===
The CCF won five seats in the 1953 election.

- A. Russell Paulley - Kildonan-Transcona 1953–1958, Radisson 1958-1959-1966-1969, Transcona 1969–1973–1977

=== 1958 general election ===
The CCF won eleven seats in the 1958 election.

- Edward Schreyer Brokenhead 1958-1959-1962-1965by (ran federally, NDP won), Rossmere 1969-1973-1977-1979by (retired, NDP won)
- Steve Peters - Elmwood 1958-1959-1962-1966 (retired, NDP won)
- Peter Wagner - Fisher 1958-1959-1962 (ran, vote was rigged, NDP lost)
- A.J. Reid - Kildonan 1958-1959-1962 (retired, NDP won)
- David Orlikow - St. Johns 1958-1959-1962 (ran federally, NDP won)
- Arthur E. Wright - Seven Oaks 1958-1962-1966 (retired, NDP won)

=== 1959 general election ===
The CCF won ten seats in the 1959 election.

- Lemuel Harris - Logan 1959-1962-1966-1969 (retired, NDP won)

=== 1962 general election ===
The NDP won seven of the 57 seats available in the 1958 election.

- Saul Cherniack - St. John's 1962-1966-1969-1973-1977-1981 (retired, NDP won)

=== 1966 general election ===
The NDP won eleven of the 57 seats available in the 1966 election.

- Sam Uskiw - Brokenhead 1966–1969, Lac Du Bonnet 1969-1973-1977-1981-1986 (retired, NDP won)
- Ben Hanuschak - Burrows 1966-1969-1973-1977-1981* (quit NDP, sat as Independent)
- Russell Doern - Elmwood 1966-1969-1973-1977-1981-1984* (quit NDP, sat as Independent)
- Michael Kawchuk - Ethelbert Plains 1966-1969 (ran in Roblin, lost)
- Sidney Green - Inkster 1966-1969-1973-1977-1979* (quit NDP, sat as Independent)
- Peter Fox - Kildonan 1966-1969-1973-1977, Concordia 1981-1986 (retired, NDP won)
- Saul Miller - Seven Oaks 1966-1969-1973-1977-1981 (retired, NDP won)
- Philip Petursson - Wellington 1966-1969-1973-1977 (retired, NDP won)

=== 1969 by-election ===
The NDP won one additional seat in a by-election in 1969:

- Joseph Borowski - Churchill 1969by-1969, Thompson 1969-1972 (quit NDP, sat as Independent, NDP won riding in 1972)

=== 1969 general election ===
The NDP won 28 of the 57 seats available in the 1969 election, forming a minority government under Edward Schreyer.

- Leonard Evans - Brandon East 1969-1973-1977-1981-1986-1988-1990-1995-1999 (retired, NDP won)
- Cy Gonick - Crescentwood 1969-1973 (retired, NDP won)
- Peter Burtniak - Dauphin 1969-1973-1977 (ran, NDP lost)
- Thomas Barrow - Flin Flon 1969-1973-1977-1981 (retired, NDP won)
- John Gottfried - Gimli 1969-1973-1977 (retired, NDP lost)
- William Jenkins - Logan 1969-1973-1977-1981 (retired, NDP won)
- Ian Turnbull - Osborne 1969-1973-1977 (ran, NDP lost)
- Donald Malinowski - Point Douglas 1969-1973-1977-1981, St Johns 1981-1986 (retired, NDP won)
- Harry Shafransky - Radisson 1969-1973-1977 (ran, NDP lost)
- Jean Allard - Churchill 1969-1972 (quit NDP, sat as Independent)
- Bill Uruski - St. George 1969-1973-1977-1981, Interlake 1981-1986-1988-1990 (retired, NDP won)
- Al Mackling - St. James 1969-1973 (ran, NDP lost) 1981-1986-1988 (retired, NDP lost)
- Wally Johannson - St. Matthews 1969-1973-1977 (ran, NDP lost)
- Howard Pawley - Selkirk 1969-1973-1977-1981-1986-1988 (retired, NDP lost)
- Rene Toupin - Springfield 1969-1973-1977 (ran, NDP lost)
- Ron McBryde - the Pas 1969-1973-1977-1981 (retired, NDP won)
- Bud Boyce - Winnipeg Centre 1969-1973-1977-1981 (quit NDP to sit as an independent)

=== 1971 by-elections ===
The NDP won two additional seats in by-elections in 1971, and a third when a former Liberal crossed the floor, allowing its minority government to become a majority:

- Jim Walding - St. Vital 1971by-1973-1977-1981-1986-1988 (voted against NDP, causing NDP government to fall)
- Aime R. Pete Adam - Ste. Rose 1971by-1973-1977-1981-1986 (retired, NDP lost)
- Laurent Desjardins - St. Boniface (Liberal MLA from 1959-1962-1966-1969-1971) crossed floor to join NDP 1971–1973* (lost election by 1 vote, Election Declared Void, Won in 1974) 1974-1977-1981-1986-1988 (retired, NDP lost)

Jean René Allard, a former Liberal candidate who joined the NDP in 1969, left the NDP to sit as an Independent on April 7, 1972, and subsequently ran in the 1974 federal election as a Liberal. Joseph Borowski left the NDP caucus on June 25, 1972, reducing the NDP to a minority government. He ran as an Independent in 1972 and was defeated by the NDP.

=== 1973 general election ===
The NDP won 31 of the 57 seats available in the 1973 election and formed a majority government.

- Les Osland - Churchill 1973-1977 (retired, NDP won)
- Harvey Patterson - Crescentwood 1973-1977 (retired, NDP lost)
- Steve Derewianchuk - Emerson 1973-1977 (ran, NDP lost)
- Harvey Bostrom - Rupertsland 1973-1977-1981 (retired, NDP won)
- Ken Dillen - Thompson 1973-1977 (ran, NDP lost)

=== 1977 general election ===
The NDP won 23 of the 57 seats available in the 1977 election, resulting in the NDP losing government. Three new NDP MLAs were elected:

- Jay Cowan - Churchill 1977-1981-1986-1988-1990 (retired, riding eliminated)
- Wilson Parasiuk - Transcona 1977-1981-1986-1988 (ran, NDP lost)
- Brian Corrin - Wellington 1977–1981, Ellice 1981-1986 (retired, NDP won)

=== 1979 by-election ===
The NDP won one additional seat in a by-elections in 1979:

- Victor Schroeder - Rossmere 1979by-1981-1986-1988 (ran, NDP lost)

=== 1981 general election ===
The NDP won 34 of the 57 seats available in the 1981 election, forming a government under Howard Pawley.

- Henry Carroll - Brandon West 1981-1982 (quit NDP, sat as Independent)
- Conrad Santos - Burrows 1981–1986–1988, Broadway 1990–1995–1999, Wellington 1999-2003–2007 (quit NDP in 2007, ran as in Independent and was defeated, NDP won)
- John Plohman - Dauphin 1981-1986-1988-1990-1995 (retired, NDP won)
- Jerry Storie - Flin Flon 1981-1986-1988-1990-1994 (retired, no byelection held)
- Roland Penner - Fort Rogue 1981-1986-1988 (ran, NDP lost)
- John Bucklaschuk - Gimli 1981-1986-1988 (ran, NDP lost)
- Don Scott - Inkster 1981-1986-1988 (ran, NDP lost)
- Mary Beth Dolin - Kildonan 1981-1985by (died, NDP won)
- Maureen Hemphill - Logan 1981-1986-1988-1990 (retired, riding boundaries realigned)
- Muriel Smith - Osborne 1981-1986-1988 (ran, NDP lost)
- Gerard Lecuyer - Radisson 1981-1986-1988 (ran, NDP lost)
- Doreen Dodick - Riel 1981-1986 (ran, NDP lost)
- Phil Eyler - River East 1981-1986 (ran, NDP lost)
- Elijah Harper - Rupertsland 1981-1986-1988-1990-1993by (ran federally for Liberals)
- Eugene Kostyra - Seven Oaks 1981-1986-1988 (ran, NDP lost)
- Andy Anstett - Springfield 1981-1986 (ran, NDP lost)
- Harry Harapiak - the Pas 1981-1986-1988-1990 (retired, NDP won)
- Steve Ashton - Thompson 1981-1986-1988-1990-1995-1999-2003–2007-2011-2016 (defeated 2016)
- Myrna Phillips - Wolseley 1981-1986-1988 (ran, NDP lost)

=== 1985 by-election ===
The NDP won one additional seat in a by-elections in 1985:

- Martin Dolin - Kildonan 1985by-1986-1988 (ran, NDP lost)

=== 1986 general election ===
The NDP government of Howard Pawley was re-elected, winning 30 of the 57 seats available in the 1986 election, a loss of four seats. Despite having a majority, the government was defeated in the legislature in 1988 due to the retirement of Laurent Desjardins and backbench NDP MLA Jim Walding voting against the budget, causing the government to fall in 1988.

- Gary Doer NDP leader (1988–2009), Premier of Manitoba (1999–2009) - Concordia 1986-1988-1990-1995-1999-2003–2007-2009 (retired 2009, NDP hold)
- Harvey Smith - Ellice 1986-1988 (ran, NDP lost)
- Jim Maloway - Elmwood 1986-1988-1990-1995-1999-2003-2008 (res. to run federally, NDP won)
- Clarence Baker - Lac Du Bonnet 1986-1988 (ran, NDP lost)
- Judy Wasylycia-Leis - St. Johns 1986-1988-1990-1993 (resigned 2003 to run federally, NDP won)
- Leonard Harapiak - Swan River 1986-1988 (ran, NDP lost)

=== 1988 general election ===
The NDP government was defeated and fell to third place in the legislature with only twelve of the 57 seats available in the 1988 election, a loss of 18 seats.

=== 1990 general election ===
The NDP won twenty of the 57 seats available in the 1990 election.

- Doug Martindale - Burrows 1990-1995-1999-2003–2007-2011 (retired 2011, NDP hold)
- Clif Evans - Interlake 1990-1995-1999 (retired, NDP hold)
- Dave Chomiak - Kildonan 1990-1995-1999-2003–2007-2011-2016 (ran 2016, NDP lost)
- George Hickes - Point Douglas 1990-1995-1999-2003–2007-2011 (retired 2011, NDP hold)
- Marianne Cerilli - Radisson 1990-1995-1999-2003 (retired, NDP hold)
- Gregory Dewar - Selkirk 1990-1995-1999-2003–2007-2011-2016 (ran 2016, NDP lost)
- Rosann Wowchuk - Swan River 1990-1995-1999-2003–2007-2011 (retired 2011, NDP hold)
- Oscar Lathlin - the Pas 1990-1995-1999-2003-2008 (died, NDP hold in byelection)
- Daryl Reid - Transcona 1990-1995-1999-2003–2007-2011-2016 (retired 2016, NDP lost)
- Becky Barrett - Wellington 1990–1995–1999, Inkster 1999-2003 (retired, NDP lost)
- Jean Friesen - Wolseley 1990-1995-1999-2003 (retired, NDP won)

=== 1993 by-elections ===
The NDP won one additional seat and retained two seats in by-elections in 1993:

- Eric Robinson - Rupertsland 1993by-1995-1999-2003–2007-2011-2016 (ran 2016, NDP lost)
- Gord Mackintosh - St.Johns 1993by-1995-1999-2003–2007-2011-2016 (retired 2016, NDP hold)

=== 1995 general election ===
The NDP won 23 of the 57 seats available in the 1995 election.

- Tim Sale - Crescentwood 1995–1999, Fort Rogue 1999–2007
- Stan Struthers - Dauphin 1995–1999, Dauphin-Roblin 1999-2003–2007 Dauphin 2011-2016 (retired 2016, NDP lost)
- Gerard Jennissen - Flin Flon 1995-1999-2003–2007-2011 (retired 2011, NDP hold)
- Diane McGifford - Osborne 1995–1999, Lord Roberts 1999-2003–2007-2011 (retired 2011, riding dissolved)
- MaryAnn Mihychuk - St. James 1995–1999, Minto 1999-2003-2004by (retired 2004, NDP won byelection)

=== 1999 general election ===
The NDP won 32 of the 57 seats available in the 1999 election, forming a government under Gary Doer.

- Jim Rondeau - Assiniboia 1999-2003–2007-2011-2016 (retired 2016, NDP lost)
- Drew Caldwell - Brandon East 1999-2003–2007-2011-2016 (ran 2016, NDP lost)
- Scott Smith - Brandon West 1999-2003-2007 (ran 2007, NDP lost)
- Tom Nevakshonoff - Interlake 1999-2003–2007-2011-2016 (ran 2016, NDP lost)
- Ron Lemieux - La Verendrye 1999-2003–2007-2011 Dawson Trail 2011-2016 (retired 2016, NDP lost)
- Linda Asper - Riel 1999–2003* (resigned to move to Europe, NDP held)
- Greg Selinger NDP leader and Premier of Manitoba (2009–2016) - St. Boniface 1999-2003–2007-2011-2016-2018 (retired 2018, NDP lost)
- Bonnie Korzeniowski - St. James 1999-2003–2007-2011 (retired 2011, NDP hold)
- Nancy Allan - St. Vital 1999-2003–2007-2011-2016 (retired 2016, NDP lost)
- Cris Aglugub - the Maples 1999-2007 (retired 2017, NDP hold)

=== 2003 general election ===
The NDP government was re-elected, winning 35 of the 57 seats available in the 2003 election, a gain of three seats.

- Kerri Irvin-Ross - Fort Garry 2003–2007-2011 Fort Richmond 2011-2016 (ran 2016, NDP lost)
- Peter Bjornson - Gimli 2003–2007-2011-2015 (retired 2015, NDP lost)
- Bidhu Jha - Radisson 2003–2007-2011-2016 (retired 2016, NDP lost)
- Christine Melnick - Riel 2003–2007-2011-2016 (ran 2016, NDP lost)
- Marilyn Brick - St. Norbert 2003–2007-2011 (retired 2011, NDP hold)
- Theresa Oswald - Seine River 2003–2007-2011-2016 (retired 2016, NDP lost)
- Rob Altemeyer - Wolseley 2003–2007-2011-2016-2019 (retired 2019, NDP hold)

=== 2004 by-election ===
The NDP retained one seat in a by-election in 2004:

- Andrew Swan - Minto 2004–2007-2011-2016-2019 (retired 2019, riding dissolved)

=== 2007 election ===
The NDP won 36 of 57 seats in the 2007 Manitoba general election, a gain of one seat.

- Erin Selby - Southdale 2007-2011-2015 (resigned 2015 to run federally, NDP lost)
- Flor Marcelino - Wellington 2007–2011 Logan 2011-2016-2019 (retired 2019, riding dissolved)
- Jennifer Howard - Fort Rouge 2007–2011-2016 (retired 2016, NDP hold)
- Erna Braun- Rossmere 2007–2011-2016 (ran 2016, NDP lost)
- Mohinder Saran - The Maples 2007–2011-2016-2019 (expelled from NDP in 2017 and sat as Independent, retired 2019, NDP hold)
- Sharon Blady - Kirkfield Park 2007–2011-2016 (ran 2016, NDP lost)

=== 2009 by-elections ===
The NDP retained two seats

- Bill Blaikie - Elmwood 2009–2011 (retired 2011, NDP hold)
- Frank Whitehead - The Pas 2009–2011-2014 (retired 2014, NDP by-election hold)

=== 2010 by-election ===
The NDP retained one seat:

- Matt Wiebe - Concordia 2010by-2011-2016-2019-2023-present

=== 2011 election ===
The NDP government of Greg Selinger, who had succeeded Gary Doer in 2009, won 37 out of 57 seats, gaining 1 seat. Eight new NDP MLAs were elected:

- Clarence Pettersen - Flin Flon 2011-2016 (lost NDP nomination in 2015, ran as an Independent, NDP hold)
- Melanie Wight - Burrows 2011-2016 (ran 2016, NDP lost)
- Kevin Chief - Point Douglas 2011-2016-2017 (resigned 2017, NDP by-election hold)
- Ted Marcelino - Tyndall Park 2011-2016-2019 (ran 2019, NDP lost)
- Jim Maloway - Elmwood 2011-2016-2019-2023–present
- Deanne Crothers - St. James 2011-2016 (ran 2016, NDP lost)
- James Allum - Fort Garry-Riverview 2011-2016-2019 (retired 2019, riding dissolved)
- Dave Gaudreau - St. Norbert 2011-2016 (ran 2016, NDP lost)

=== 2015 by-election ===
The NDP retained one seat.

- Amanda Lathlin - The Pas 2015by-2016-2019 The Pas-Kameesak 2019–2023–2026 (died in office March 21, 2026. NDP hold in byelection)

=== 2016 election ===
The NDP government of Greg Selinger was defeated. The NDP won 14 seats out of 57, a loss of 21 seats. Three new NDP MLAs were elected:

- Tom Lindsey - Flin Flon 2016-2019-2023–present
- Nahanni Fontaine - St. Johns 2016-2019-2023–present
- Wab Kinew, NDP leader (2017–present), Premier of Manitoba (2023–present) - Fort Rouge 2016-2019-2023–present

=== 2017 by-election ===
The NDP retained one seat.

- Bernadette Smith - Point Douglas 2017by-2019-2023–present

=== 2019 election ===
The NDP under Wab Kinew won 18 seats out of 57, a gain of six seats. 11 new NDP MLAs were elected:

- Ian Bushie - Keewatinook 2019-2023–present
- Danielle Adams - Thompson 2019-2021 (died in traffic accident, NDP hold in byelection)
- Diljeet Brar - Burrows 2019-2023–present
- Mintu Sandhu - The Maples 2019-2023–present
- Nello Altomare - Transcona 2019-2023-2025 (died from complications from Chemotherapy, NDP hold in byelection)
- Adrien Sala - St. James 2019-2023–present
- Mark Wasyliw - Fort Garry 2019-2023-2024 (removed from NDP Caucus and continues to sit as an independent MLA)
- Malaya Marcelino - Notre Dame 2019-2023–present
- Uzoma Asagwara - Union Station 2019-2023–present
- Lisa Naylor - Wolseley 2019-2023–present
- Jamie Moses - St. Vital 2019-2023–present

=== 2022 by-election ===
The NDP retained one seat.

- Eric Redhead - Thompson 2022–present

=== 2023 Election ===
The NDP won 34 out of 57 seats in the 2023 Manitoba general election, a gain of 16 seats. forming a majority government under Wab Kinew. 16 new MLA's were elected:

- Jelynn Dela Cruz Radisson 2023–present (youngest woman elected to the Legislature in Manitoba's history at 23)
- Glen Simard Brandon East 2023–present
- Ron Kostyshyn Dauphin 2023–present
- Rachelle Schott Kildonan-River East 2023–present
- Jasdeep Devgan Mcphillips 2023–present
- Tracy Schmidt Rossmere 2023–present
- Robert Loiselle St. Boniface 2023–present
- Nellie Kennedy Assiniboia 2023–present
- Logan Oxenham Kirkfield Park 2023–present
- Mike Moroz River Heights 2023–present
- Jennifer Chen Fort Richmond 2023–present
- Tyler Blashko Lagimodière 2023–present
- Mike Moyes Riel 2023–present
- Billie Cross Seine River 2023–present
- Renée Cable Southdale 2023–present
- David Pankratz Waverley 2023–present

=== 2024 by-election ===
NDP gained one seat

- Carla Compton: Tuxedo 2024 by-election - present

=== 2025 by-election ===
NDP retained one seat

- Shannon Corbett: 2025 Transcona by-election-present

=== 2026 by-election ===
NDP retained one seat

- Jennifer Flett: 2026 by-election-present

== Articles on prominent NDPers/CCFers at the municipal level ==
- William Barlow (mayor) - Former Mayor of Gimli
- Errol Black - Brandon City Councillor
- Rick Boychuk - Former Winnipeg City Councillor
- Ross Eadie - Winnipeg City Councillor
- Magnus Eliason - Former Winnipeg City Councillor, Founding Member of the CCF and the NDP
- Duane Nicol - Selkirk Chief Administrative Officer (CAO) and Former Selkirk City Councillor
- Harvey Smith - Winnipeg City Councillor, Daniel McIntyre Ward
- Lillian Thomas - Deputy Mayor of Winnipeg

== Articles on prominent Manitoba CCF/NDP members and organizers ==
- Magnus Eliason - co-founder CCF, long time Winnipeg City Councillor

== See also ==
- List of articles about CCF/NDP members
- List of articles about British Columbia CCF/NDP members
- List of articles about Alberta CCF/NDP members
- List of articles about Saskatchewan CCF/NDP members
- List of articles about Ontario CCF/NDP members
- List of articles about Nova Scotia CCF/NDP members
- List of articles about Yukon NDP members
