= 42nd Manitoba Legislature =

- Majority parliament
- Aug. 12, 2019 – Sep. 5, 2023

Parliament leaders
- Premier: Brian Pallister; August 12, 2019 - September 1, 2021
- Kelvin Goertzen; September 1, 2021 - November 2, 2021
- Heather Stefanson; November 2, 2021 - September 5, 2023
- Leader of the Opposition: Wab Kinew

Party caucuses
- Government: Progressive Conservative
- Opposition: New Democrat
- Unrecognized: Liberal

Legislative Assembly
- Speaker of the Assembly: Myrna Driedger; August 12, 2019 - September 5, 2023
- Members: 57 MLA seats

Sovereign
- Monarch: Elizabeth II; 6 February 1952 – 8 September 2022
- Charles III; 8 September 2022 – present
- Lieutenant governor: Hon. Janice Filmon until 24 October 2022
- Hon. Anita Neville from 24 October 2022

Sessions
- 1st session September 30, 2019 – October 10, 2019
- 2nd session November 19, 2019 – May 27, 2020
- 3rd session October 7, 2020 – November 4, 2021
- 4th session November 23, 2021 – November 3, 2022
- 5th session November 15, 2022 – June 1, 2023
| ← 41st | → 43rd |

The 42nd Manitoba Legislature was created following a general election in 2019.

The Progressive Conservative Party, led by Brian Pallister, formed a majority government after winning a majority of seats in the Legislative Assembly of Manitoba. Pallister stepped down from the role in 2021, and was replaced on an interim basis by Kelvin Goertzen and on a permanent basis by Heather Stefanson.

== Members of the 42nd Legislative Assembly ==
| Member | Party | Constituency | First elected / previously elected | No.# of term(s) | Notes |
|---|---|---|---|---|---|
| **Eileen Clarke** | Progressive Conservative | Agassiz | 2016 | 2nd term | |
| **Scott Johnston** | Progressive Conservative | Assiniboia | 2016 | 2nd term | |
| Josh Guenter | Progressive Conservative | Borderland | 2019 | 1st term | |
| Len Isleifson | Progressive Conservative | Brandon East | 2016 | 2nd term | |
| Reg Helwer | Progressive Conservative | Brandon West | 2011 | 3rd term | |
| Diljeet Brar | New Democratic | Burrows | 2019 | 1st term | |
| Matt Wiebe | New Democratic | Concordia | 2010 | 4th term | |
| Brad Michaleski | Progressive Conservative | Dauphin | 2016 | 2nd term | |
| Bob Lagassé | Progressive Conservative | Dawson Trail | 2016 | 2nd term | |
| Jim Maloway | New Democratic | Elmwood | 1986, 2011 | 10th term* | |
| Tom Lindsey | New Democratic | Flin Flon | 2016 | 2nd term | |
| Mark Wasyliw | New Democratic | Fort Garry | 2019 | 1st term | |
| **Sarah Guillemard** | Progressive Conservative | Fort Richmond | 2016 | 2nd term | |
| Wab Kinew | New Democratic | Fort Rouge | 2016 | 2nd term | |
| Brian Pallister | Progressive Conservative | Fort Whyte | 1992, (Note: Portage la Prairie) 2012 | 5th term* | Until October 4, 2021 |
| **Obby Khan** (From March 22, 2022) | Progressive Conservative | Fort Whyte | 2022 | 1st term | Elected in a by-election |
| **Derek Johnson** | Progressive Conservative | Interlake-Gimli | 2016 | 2nd term | |
| Ian Bushie | New Democratic | Keewatinook | 2019 | 1st term | |
| Cathy Cox | Progressive Conservative | Kildonan-River East | 2016 | 2nd term | |
| Scott Fielding | Progressive Conservative | Kirkfield Park | 2016 | 2nd term | Until June 20, 2022 |
| **Kevin Klein** (From December 13, 2022) | Progressive Conservative | Kirkfield Park | 2022 | 1st term | Elected in a by-election |
| Dennis Smook | Progressive Conservative | La Verendrye | 2011 | 3rd term | |
| **Wayne Ewasko** | Progressive Conservative | Lac du Bonnet | 2011 | 3rd term | |
| **Andrew Smith** | Progressive Conservative | Lagimodière | 2016 | 2nd term | |
| Ralph Eichler | Progressive Conservative | Lakeside | 2003 | 5th term | |
| Shannon Martin | Progressive Conservative | McPhillips | 2014 | 3rd term | |
| Blaine Pedersen | Progressive Conservative | Midland | 2007 | 4th term | |
| Cameron Friesen | Progressive Conservative | Morden-Winkler | 2011 | 3rd term | Resigned February 3, 2023 to run federally |
| Malaya Marcelino | New Democratic | Notre Dame | 2019 | 1st term | |
| Bernadette Smith | New Democratic | Point Douglas | 2017 | 2nd term | |
| Ian Wishart | Progressive Conservative | Portage la Prairie | 2011 | 3rd term | |
| **James Teitsma** | Progressive Conservative | Radisson | 2016 | 2nd term | |
| **Jeff Wharton** | Progressive Conservative | Red River North | 2016 | 2nd term | |
| **Greg Nesbitt** | Progressive Conservative | Riding Mountain | 2016 | 2nd term | |
| **Rochelle Squires** | Progressive Conservative | Riel | 2016 | 2nd term | |
| Jon Gerrard | Liberal | River Heights | 1999 | 6th term | |
| Myrna Driedger (Note: Speaker of the Assembly.) | Progressive Conservative | Roblin | 1998 | 7th term | |
| Andrew Micklefield | Progressive Conservative | Rossmere | 2016 | 2nd term | |
| **Janice Morley-Lecomte** | Progressive Conservative | Seine River | 2016 | 2nd term | |
| Alan Lagimodiere | Progressive Conservative | Selkirk | 2016 | 2nd term | |
| **Audrey Gordon** | Progressive Conservative | Southdale | 2019 | 1st term | |
| Ron Schuler | Progressive Conservative | Springfield-Ritchot | 1999 | 6th term | |
| **Cliff Cullen** | Progressive Conservative | Spruce Woods | 2004 | 5th term | |
| Dougald Lamont | Liberal | St. Boniface | 2018 | 2nd term | |
| Adrien Sala | New Democratic | St. James | 2019 | 1st term | |
| Nahanni Fontaine | New Democratic | St. Johns | 2016 | 2nd term | |
| Jamie Moses | New Democratic | St. Vital | 2019 | 1st term | |
| **Kelvin Goertzen** | Progressive Conservative | Steinbach | 2003 | 5th term | |
| Rick Wowchuk | Progressive Conservative | Swan River | 2016 | 2nd term | |
| Mintu Sandhu | New Democratic | The Maples | 2019 | 1st term | |
| Amanda Lathlin | New Democratic | The Pas-Kameesak | 2015 | 3rd term | |
| Danielle Adams | New Democratic | Thompson | 2019 | 1st term | Died in office December 9, 2021 |
| Eric Redhead (From June 7, 2022) | New Democratic | Thompson | 2022 | 1st term | Elected in a by-election |
| Nello Altomare | New Democratic | Transcona | 2019 | 1st term | |
| **Doyle Piwniuk** | Progressive Conservative | Turtle Mountain | 2014 | 3rd term | |
| **Heather Stefanson** | Progressive Conservative | Tuxedo | 2000 | 6th term | |
| Cindy Lamoureux | Liberal | Tyndall Park | 2016 | 2nd term | |
| Uzoma Asagwara | New Democratic | Union Station | 2019 | 1st term | |
| **Jon Reyes** | Progressive Conservative | Waverley | 2016 | 2nd term | |
| Lisa Naylor | New Democratic | Wolseley | 2019 | 1st term | |

- Members in **bold** are in the Cabinet of Manitoba

== By-elections prior to 2023 election ==
Manitoba provincial by-election, March 22, 2022: Fort Whyte Resignation of Brian Pallister
| Party | Candidate | Votes | % | ±% | Expenditures |
|---|---|---|---|---|---|
| Progressive Conservative | Obby Khan | 3,050 | 42.51 | –14.68 | |
| Liberal | Willard Reaves | 2,853 | 39.77 | +22.53 | |
| New Democratic | Trudy Schroeder | 1,112 | 15.50 | –2.38 | |
| Independent | Patrick Allard | 101 | 1.41 | — | |
| Green | Nicolas Geddert | 55 | 0.77 | –6.00 | |
| Total valid votes | | 7,174 | | | |
| Total rejected ballots | | 15 | 0.21 | –0.33 | |
| Turnout | | 7,189 | 42.62 | –14.57 | |
| Eligible voters | | 15,907 | — | –0.29 | |
| Progressive Conservative hold | | Swing | | -18.61 | |
Source: Elections Manitoba

Manitoba provincial by-election, June 7, 2022: Thompson Death of Danielle Adams
| Party | Candidate | Votes | % | ±% | Expenditures |
|---|---|---|---|---|---|
| New Democratic | Eric Redhead | 1,465 | 70.74 | +16.19 | |
| Progressive Conservative | Charlotte Larocque | 581 | 28.05 | –7.63 | |
| Total valid votes | | 2,046 | | | |
| Total rejected ballots | | 25 | 1.20 | | |
| Turnout | | 2,071 | 19.34 | | |
| Eligible voters | | 10,706 | — | | |
| New Democratic hold | | Swing | | +12.44 | |

Manitoba provincial by-election, December 13, 2022: Kirkfield Park Resignation of Scott Fielding
| Party | Candidate | Votes | % | ±% | Expenditures |
|---|---|---|---|---|---|
| Progressive Conservative | Kevin Klein | 2,357 | 37.04 | –13.32 | |
| New Democratic | Logan Oxenham | 2,196 | 34.51 | +8.82 | |
| Liberal | Rhonda Nichol | 1,741 | 27.36 | +11.68 | |
| Green | Dennis Bayomi | 70 | 1.10 | –7.19 | |
| Total valid votes | | 6,364 | 99.86 | | |
| Total rejected ballots | | 11 | 0.17 | –0.58 | |
| Turnout | | 6,375 | 36.50 | –24.75 | |
| Eligible voters | | 17,468 | | | |
| Progressive Conservative hold | | Swing | | –11.07 | |
