= Joe Borowski =

Joe Borowski may refer to:

- Joe Borowski (politician) (1933–1996), Canadian politician
- Joe Borowski (baseball) (born 1971), American baseball pitcher
