= E. J. Williams =

Canadian politician (1918–2021)

E. J. (Joe) Williams

Member of the Legislative Assembly of Manitoba
- In office 1958–1959
- Succeeded by: John Ingebrigtson
- Constituency: Churchill

Personal details
- Born: Edward Joseph Williams; January 28, 1918 Brandon, Manitoba, Canada
- Died: August 18, 2021 (aged 103) Nanaimo, British Columbia, Canada
- Party: Progressive Conservative Party of Manitoba

Edward Joseph Williams (January 28, 1918 – August 18, 2021) was a politician in Manitoba, Canada.

== Biography ==
Born in Brandon in 1918, he was raised in Fort William, Ontario. He served in various units of the Canadian army between 1939 and 1945; he started as a private in the 4th Canadian Field Ambulance and later obtained his commission at RMC Sandhurst with the Royal Armoured Corps. He served in the Legislative Assembly of Manitoba as a progressive conservative from 1958 to 1959.

Williams was elected to the Manitoba legislature in the 1958 provincial election in the sprawling northern constituency of Churchill. He defeated liberal progressive candidate K.D. Wray by 297 votes in a poll that was deferred until after the rest of the province had voted. The Progressive Conservatives won a minority government in this election, and Williams became a backbench supporter of Dufferin Roblin's government.

He did not seek re-election in 1959, but later went on to become President of the Churchill Chamber of commerce and obtained brief fame by appearing on the CBC National News suggesting that Churchill would be much better off as part of the federally governed Northwest Territories (NWT). Williams subsequently became Director of Industrial Development for the District of Mackenzie of the NWT and then worked with the Department of Indian and Northern Affairs until his retirement in 1983. He died in August 2021 in Nanaimo British Columbia, at the age of 103.
