= Gordon Beard =

Canadian politician

Gordon W. Beard

Member of the Legislative Assembly of Manitoba for Churchill
- In office June 25, 1969 – November 12, 1972
- Preceded by: Joseph Borowski
- Succeeded by: Les Osland
- In office January 4, 1963 – October 8, 1968
- Preceded by: John Ingebrigtson
- Succeeded by: Joseph Borowski

Personal details
- Born: September 27, 1921 Neepawa, Manitoba, Canada
- Died: November 12, 1972 (aged 51) Thompson, Manitoba, Canada
- Party: Progressive Conservative Party of Manitoba; Independent
- Spouse: Mabel (died 2010)
- Children: 2

Gordon Wilbert Beard (September 27, 1921 – November 12, 1972) was a politician in Manitoba, Canada. He was a Progressive Conservative member of the Manitoba Legislature from 1963 to 1968, and an independent member from 1969 to 1972.

Born in 1921, Beard was educated at Neepawa schools, and worked in a variety of projects in northern Manitoba. He served as President of Norrec Ltd., and Secretary of Arctic Investments Ltd., as well as becoming President of the Northern Restaurants Association through a hotel project that he owned. He served in the Canadian Army from 1942 to 1945, attaining the rank of Sergeant. In 1960, he moved to Thompson.

Beard was first elected to the Manitoba legislature in January 1963, in a deferred race from the 1962 general election. Running in the vast northern constituency of Churchill, he defeated Liberal candidate Francis Bud Jobin by 197 votes. He was re-elected by a greater margin in the 1966 election.

Beard resigned from the Progressive Conservative Party and stepped down as an MLA in 1968, complaining that the PC government was neglecting northern affairs. He later attended the Liberal Party's nomination meeting for the by-election that chose his successor. He ran as an independent in the 1969 election, and narrowly defeated three other candidates to regain the Churchill riding.

For the next three years, Beard was a legitimately independent MLA—siding with or against the NDP government of Edward Schreyer on a case-by-case basis. He died in Thompson of a heart attack on November 12, 1972.

He was married to Mabel and had two children, Holly Christine Beard, who later served on Thompson city council and as an appeal court judge, and William Fredrick Beard.

The Gordon Beard arena in Thompson was named in his honour.

== Electoral record ==
1969 Manitoba general election: Churchill
Party	Candidate	Votes	%	±%
Independent	Gordon Beard	1,151	29.84	–
Liberal	Walter Perepeluk	971	25.18	11.43
Progressive Conservative	Andre Champagne	913	23.67	2.50
New Democratic	Wilf Hudson	822	21.31	-11.36
Total valid votes		3,857	–	–
Rejected		32	–	
Eligible voters / Turnout		6,630	58.66	–
Source(s) Source: Manitoba. Chief Electoral Officer (1999). Statement of Votes for the 37th Provincial General Election, September 21, 1999 (PDF) (Report). Winnipeg: Elections Manitoba.

1966 Manitoba general election: Churchill
Party	Candidate	Votes	%	±%
Progressive Conservative	Gordon Beard	3,159	59.04	6.65
New Democratic	Wilfred L. Hudson	2,192	40.96	–
Total valid votes		5,351	–	–
Rejected		39	–	
Eligible voters / Turnout		8,699	61.96	4.78
Source(s) Source: Manitoba. Chief Electoral Officer (1999). Statement of Votes for the 37th Provincial General Election, September 21, 1999 (PDF) (Report). Winnipeg: Elections Manitoba.

1962 Manitoba general election: Churchill
Party	Candidate	Votes	%	±%
Progressive Conservative	Gordon Beard	2,170	52.39	-2.09
Liberal	Francis Lawrence Jobin	1,973	47.61	–
Total valid votes		4,143	–	–
Rejected		129	–	
Eligible voters / Turnout		7,476	57.18	7.87
Source(s) Source: Manitoba. Chief Electoral Officer (1999). Statement of Votes for the 37th Provincial General Election, September 21, 1999 (PDF) (Report). Winnipeg: Elections Manitoba.
