= Churchill (provincial electoral district) =

Defunct provincial electoral district in Manitoba, Canada

Churchill is a former provincial electoral district of Manitoba, Canada. It was created by redistribution in 1956, and eliminated in 1999.

During its existence, Churchill encompassed the northernmost region of the province, a vast and sparsely populated area with no major urban centres. Most of the riding's residents were Indigenous, many of whom also lived in isolated communities.

Elections in this riding were frequently deferred for logistical reasons prior to 1969.

When the riding was abolished, its territory was divided between the ridings of Rupertsland (now Keewatinook), Flin Flon, and Thompson.

== Members of the Legislative Assembly ==
Name	Party	Took office	Left office
E.J. Williams	PC	1958	1959
John Ingebrigtson	PC	1959	1963
Gordon Beard	PC	1963	1968
Joseph Borowski	NDP	1969	1969
Gordon Beard	Independent	1969	1972
Les Osland	NDP	1973	1977
Jay Cowan	NDP	1977	1990

== Election results ==
=== 1958 ===
1958 Manitoba general election
Party	Candidate	Votes	%
Progressive Conservative	E. J. Williams	1,580	48.87
Liberal–Progressive	K. Don Wray	1,283	39.68
Co-operative Commonwealth	Frank Mercer	370	11.44
Total valid votes		3,233	–
Rejected		4	–
Eligible voters / Turnout		5,670	57.09
Source(s) Source: Manitoba. Chief Electoral Officer (1999). Statement of Votes for the 37th Provincial General Election, September 21, 1999 (PDF) (Report). Winnipeg: Elections Manitoba.

=== 1959 ===
1959 Manitoba general election
Party	Candidate	Votes	%	±%
Progressive Conservative	John E. Ingebrigston	1,587	54.48	5.61
Liberal–Progressive	Kenneth D. Wray	1,326	45.52	5.84
Total valid votes		2,913	–	–
Rejected		40	–	
Eligible voters / Turnout		5,988	49.32	-7.77
Source(s) Source: Manitoba. Chief Electoral Officer (1999). Statement of Votes for the 37th Provincial General Election, September 21, 1999 (PDF) (Report). Winnipeg: Elections Manitoba.

=== 1962 ===
1962 Manitoba general election
Party	Candidate	Votes	%	±%
Progressive Conservative	Gordon Beard	2,170	52.39	-2.09
Liberal	Francis Lawrence Jobin	1,973	47.61	–
Total valid votes		4,143	–	–
Rejected		129	–	
Eligible voters / Turnout		7,476	57.18	7.87
Source(s) Source: Manitoba. Chief Electoral Officer (1999). Statement of Votes for the 37th Provincial General Election, September 21, 1999 (PDF) (Report). Winnipeg: Elections Manitoba.

=== 1966 ===
1966 Manitoba general election
Party	Candidate	Votes	%	±%
Progressive Conservative	Gordon Beard	3,159	59.04	6.65
New Democratic	Wilfred L. Hudson	2,192	40.96	–
Total valid votes		5,351	–	–
Rejected		39	–	
Eligible voters / Turnout		8,699	61.96	4.78
Source(s) Source: Manitoba. Chief Electoral Officer (1999). Statement of Votes for the 37th Provincial General Election, September 21, 1999 (PDF) (Report). Winnipeg: Elections Manitoba.

=== 1969 by-election ===
Manitoba provincial by-election, February 20, 1969 Resignation of Gordon Beard
Party	Candidate	Votes	%	±%	Expenditures
New Democratic	Joseph Borowski	2,637	32.67		$2,350.33
Independent	Blain Johnston	2,616	32.41		$3,733.76
Liberal	Garry Walsh	1,709	21.17	–	$6,242.87
Progressive Conservative	Michael Klewchuk	1,109	13.74		$7,346.47
Total valid votes		8,071	100		
Rejected and discarded votes		17			
Turnout		8,088	62.97		
Electors on the lists		12,845			

=== 1969 ===
1969 Manitoba general election
Party	Candidate	Votes	%	±%
Independent	Gordon Beard	1,151	29.84	–
Liberal	Walter Perepeluk	971	25.18	11.43
Progressive Conservative	Andre Champagne	913	23.67	2.50
New Democratic	Wilf Hudson	822	21.31	-11.36
Total valid votes		3,857	–	–
Rejected		32	–	
Eligible voters / Turnout		6,630	58.66	–
Source(s) Source: Manitoba. Chief Electoral Officer (1999). Statement of Votes for the 37th Provincial General Election, September 21, 1999 (PDF) (Report). Winnipeg: Elections Manitoba.

=== 1973 ===
1973 Manitoba general election
Party	Candidate	Votes	%	±%
New Democratic	Les Osland	2,041	36.81	15.50
Progressive Conservative	Andy Champagne	1,367	24.66	0.99
Liberal	Walter Perepeluk	1,256	22.66	-2.52
Independent	Andrew Kirkness	880	15.87	–
Total valid votes		5,544	–	–
Rejected		48	–	
Eligible voters / Turnout		8,957	62.43	3.77
Source(s) Source: Manitoba. Chief Electoral Officer (1999). Statement of Votes for the 37th Provincial General Election, September 21, 1999 (PDF) (Report). Winnipeg: Elections Manitoba.

=== 1977 ===
1977 Manitoba general election
Party	Candidate	Votes	%	±%
New Democratic	Jay Cowan	2,280	42.13	5.31
Progressive Conservative	Mark Ingebrigtson	1,992	36.81	12.15
Liberal	Andrew Kirkness	1,140	21.06	-1.59
Total valid votes		5,412	–	–
Rejected		24	–	
Eligible voters / Turnout		9,501	57.22	-5.22
Source(s) Source: Manitoba. Chief Electoral Officer (1999). Statement of Votes for the 37th Provincial General Election, September 21, 1999 (PDF) (Report). Winnipeg: Elections Manitoba.

=== 1981 ===
1981 Manitoba general election
Party	Candidate	Votes	%	±%
New Democratic	Jay Cowan	2,247	64.55	22.42
Progressive Conservative	Mark Ingebrigtson	883	25.37	-11.44
Liberal	Andrew Kirkness	266	7.64	-13.42
Progressive	Doug MacLachlan	85	2.44	–
Total valid votes		3,481	–	–
Rejected		28	–	
Eligible voters / Turnout		5,742	61.11	3.90
Source(s) Source: Manitoba. Chief Electoral Officer (1999). Statement of Votes for the 37th Provincial General Election, September 21, 1999 (PDF) (Report). Winnipeg: Elections Manitoba.

=== 1986 ===
1986 Manitoba general election
Party	Candidate	Votes	%	±%
New Democratic	Jay Cowan	2,940	73.50	8.95
Progressive Conservative	Walter Menard	857	21.43	-3.94
Liberal	Mildred Wilke	203	5.08	-2.57
Total valid votes		4,000	–	–
Rejected		11	–	
Eligible voters / Turnout		6,570	61.05	-0.06
Source(s) Source: Manitoba. Chief Electoral Officer (1999). Statement of Votes for the 37th Provincial General Election, September 21, 1999 (PDF) (Report). Winnipeg: Elections Manitoba.

=== 1988 ===
1988 Manitoba general election
Party	Candidate	Votes	%	±%
New Democratic	Jay Cowan	2,396	58.03	-15.47
Progressive Conservative	Wayne Wittmeier	1,019	24.68	3.25
Liberal	George Kernaghan	714	17.29	12.22
Total valid votes		4,129	–	–
Rejected		11	–	
Eligible voters / Turnout		6,653	62.23	1.18
Source(s) Source: Manitoba. Chief Electoral Officer (1999). Statement of Votes for the 37th Provincial General Election, September 21, 1999 (PDF) (Report). Winnipeg: Elections Manitoba.

== See also ==
- List of Manitoba provincial electoral districts
- Canadian provincial electoral districts
