= Minister for Industry and Commerce =

Minister for Industry and Commerce may refer to:

- Minister of Commerce and Industries (Afghanistan)
- State Administration for Industry and Commerce, PR China
- Minister of Commerce and Industry (France)
- Minister for Enterprise, Tourism and Employment, Ireland ("Minister for Industry and Commerce" 1922–1981, 1986–1993)
- Ministry of Commerce and Industry (India)
- Minister of Industry and Commerce (Manitoba)
- Ministry of Industry and Commerce (Turkey)
- Ministry of Industry and Commerce (Zimbabwe)

== See also ==
- Industry minister
- Commerce minister
