= Manitoba Liberal Party candidates in the 1973 Manitoba provincial election =

The Manitoba Liberal Party fielded several candidates in the 1973 provincial election, and elected five candidates to emerge as the third-largest party in the legislature. Many of the party's candidates have their own biography pages; information about others may be found here.

== Candidates ==
=== Point Douglas: Lawrence Belanger ===
Lawrence Belanger received 569 votes (10.15%), finishing third against New Democratic Party incumbent Donald Malinowski.

=== St. Vital: Dan Kennedy ===
Daniel Kennedy received 3,765 votes (38.18%), finishing a close second against New Democratic Party incumbent Jim Walding.

=== Thompson: Blain Johnston ===
Blain Johnston, a doctor from Winnipeg, became the first medical doctor in Thompson, Manitoba in 1957. He led the Thompson Clinic and represented northern Manitoba in the Manitoba Medical Association. Johnston initially opted out of Manitoba's medicare program in 1969 and encouraged other doctors in Thompson to do the same.

Johnston was elected to the Thompson city council in the 1966 municipal election, topping the polls in the city's single multi-member division. He became deputy mayor before resigning his seat in late 1968.

He first ran for the Manitoba legislature in a by-election held for the Churchill electoral division on February 20, 1969. He was forty-one years old at the time of the campaign. Johnston ran as an independent, and some local Liberals charged that his candidacy was organized by the governing Progressive Conservatives to split the opposition vote. Johnston rejected this charge, as did the Progressive Conservatives. Johnston ultimately defeated both the Liberal and Progressive Conservative candidates and finished a very narrow second behind New Democratic Party candidate Joe Borowski. (The original returns showed Borowski with a twenty-three vote lead; a judicial recount narrowed his majority to seventeen.)

Johnston returned to municipal politics, and was elected to the second position on Thompson's city council in the 1970 municipal election. He ran for the provincial legislature as a Liberal in the 1973 provincial election and finished third against New Democrat Ken Dillen in Thompson.

Johnston's son, Tim Johnston, was elected mayor of Thompson in 2006.

Electoral record
Election	Division	Party	Votes	%	Place	Winner
provincial by-election, 20 February 1969	Churchill	Independent	2,616	32.41	2/4	Joseph Borowski, New Democratic Party
1973 provincial	Thompson	Liberal	2,083	28.51	3/3	Ken Dillen, New Democratic Party
