= Charles Witney =

Canadian politician

Member of the Legislative Assembly of Manitoba for Flin Flon
- In office May 14, 1959 – June 25, 1969
- Preceded by: Bud Jobin
- Succeeded by: Thomas Barrow

Personal details
- Born: Charles Hubert Witney; July 12, 1919 Moose Jaw, Saskatchewan
- Died: May 21, 1991 (aged 71) Nepean, Ontario
- Party: Progressive Conservative

Charles Hubert (Buck) Witney (July 12, 1919 – May 21, 1991) was a politician in Manitoba, Canada. He was a Progressive Conservative member of the Legislative Assembly of Manitoba from 1959 to 1969, and served as a cabinet minister in the governments of Dufferin Roblin and Walter Weir.

Witney was born in Moose Jaw, Saskatchewan. The son of Percy Howard Witney and Winnifred Marion Herrington, Witney was educated at Technical High School in Moose Jaw, and did not attend university. During World War II, he served as a radar mechanic in the Royal Canadian Air Force. In 1947, Witney married Vera Ruby Matthews. He moved to Flin Flon in 1949. Prior to his election, he was a star personality at CFAR, at the time the only radio station in Flin Flon.

Known as a populist, he first ran for the Manitoba legislature in the 1958 provincial election, against Liberal-Progressive Francis Bud Jobin in the riding of Flin Flon. He lost, but defeated Jobin in the 1959 provincial election, as the Progressive Conservatives won a majority government under the leadership of Dufferin Roblin. Witney defeated Jobin, who later served as Lieutenant Governor of Manitoba. He was appointed Minister of Mines and Natural Resources on August 7, 1959.

Re-elected in the 1962 provincial election, Witney was appointed Minister of Health on December 9, 1963. He held this position for the remainder of Roblin's time in office, and was retained in the portfolio when Walter Weir succeeded Roblin as Premier in 1967. Many aldermen in Winnipeg found him extremely stubborn on health-related matters. On September 24, 1968, he was transferred to the Ministry of Labour.

He was defeated by New Democratic Party candidate Thomas Barrow in the 1969 provincial election, and did not seek re-election after that time.

In 1969, Witney moved to Toronto, where he served as executive director of the Canadian School Trustees Association. He moved to Ottawa when the association moved its office there in 1975. Witney died at home in Nepean at the age of 71.
