= Kelly Bindle =

Canadian provincial politician

Kelly Bindle MLA

Member of the Legislative Assembly of Manitoba for Thompson
- In office April 19, 2016 – August 12, 2019
- Preceded by: Steve Ashton
- Succeeded by: Danielle Adams

Personal details
- Born: Thompson, Manitoba
- Party: Progressive Conservative

Kelly Bindle is a Canadian provincial politician, who was elected as the Member of the Legislative Assembly of Manitoba for the riding of Thompson in the 2016 election. He is a member of the Progressive Conservative Party of Manitoba. He defeated incumbent New Democratic Party MLA Steve Ashton in the election. Ashton had served continuously since 1981.

After serving for the three-and-a-half-year-long 41st Manitoba Legislature, Bindle lost his seat to NDP challenger Danielle Adams in 2019. He did not serve in the cabinet led by Brian Pallister while the latter was Premier of Manitoba.

== Election results ==
2019 Manitoba general election: Thompson
Party	Candidate	Votes	%	±%	Expenditures
New Democratic	Danielle Adams	2,686	54.55	+16.1	$13,643.39
Progressive Conservative	Kelly Bindle	1,757	35.68	-4.8	$37,215.90
Green	Meagan Jemmett	298	6.05		$0.00
Liberal	Darla Contois	183	3.72	-17.2	$0.00
Total valid votes		4,924	99.58		
Total rejected ballots		21	0.42		
Turnout		4,945	37.27		
Eligible voters		13,267			
New Democratic gain from Progressive Conservative		Swing		+10.5	

2016 Manitoba general election: Thompson
Party	Candidate	Votes	%	±%	Expenditures
Progressive Conservative	Kelly Bindle	1,712	44.16	+15.86	$11,544.03
New Democratic	Steve Ashton	1,527	39.39	-29.14	$17,980.87
Liberal	Inez Vystrcil-Spence	638	16.46	+13.28	$7,318.95
Total valid votes/expense limit		3,877	99.13		$32,545.00
Total rejected ballots		34	0.87	+0.39	
Turnout		3,911	37.36	+0.64	
Eligible voters		10,469			
Progressive Conservative gain from New Democratic		Swing		+22.50	
Source: Elections Manitoba
