= Flin Flon (electoral district) =

Provincial electoral district in Manitoba, Canada

Coordinates: 57.657°N 100.283°W

Manitoba electoral district

Provincial electoral district
- Legislature: Legislative Assembly of Manitoba
MLA
Tom Lindsey
New Democratic
- District created: 1958
- Last contested: 2023

Demographics
- Population (2016): 22,930
- Electors (2019): 14,896
- Area (km²): 158,845
- Pop. density (per km²): 0.14

Flin Flon is a provincial electoral district in the Canadian province of Manitoba. It was created by redistribution in 1957, and has formally existed since the provincial election of 1958.

At about 80,000 square kilometres, Flin Flon occupies roughly 20% of Manitoba's total area, and is the second largest riding in the province after Rupertsland. It was a smaller riding before 1989, when it gained a significant amount of territory from the former riding of Churchill. It is a mostly rural and sparsely populated riding, located in the province's northwestern corner.

Flin Flon is bordered by Saskatchewan to the west, Nunavut to the north, the ridings of Rupertsland and Thompson to the east, and the riding of The Pas to the south. The actual city of Flin Flon is located in the southwestern corner of the riding, and is its only urban centre.

The riding's population in 1996 was 14,470. In 1999, the average family income was $55,113, and the unemployment rate was 9.70%. Manufacturing accounts for 17% of Flin Flon's economy, followed by mining and oil production at 16%.

73.4% of Flin Flon's residents are aboriginal.

Flin Flon has been held by the New Democratic Party of Manitoba (NDP) since 1969. The current MLA is Tom Lindsey, who was elected in the provincial election of 2016. He replaced the incumbent, Clarence Pettersen who was de-selected by the NDP and decided to contest the election as an independent.

== Members of the Legislative Assembly ==
Assembly	Years	Member	Party
Riding created from The Pas
25th	1958-1959	Francis Bud Jobin	Liberal-Progressive
26th	1959-1962	Charles Witney	Progressive Conservative
27th	1962-1966	Charles Witney	Progressive Conservative
28th	1966-1969	Charles Witney	Progressive Conservative
29th	1969-1973	Thomas Barrow	New Democratic
30th	1973-1977	Thomas Barrow	New Democratic
31st	1977-1981	Thomas Barrow	New Democratic
32nd	1982-1985	Jerry Storie	New Democratic
33rd	1985-1988	Jerry Storie	New Democratic
34th	1988-1990	Jerry Storie	New Democratic
35th	1990-1995	Jerry Storie	New Democratic
36th	1995-1999	Gerard Jennissen	New Democratic
37th	1999-2003	Gerard Jennissen	New Democratic
38th	2003-2007	Gerard Jennissen	New Democratic
39th	2007-2011	Gerard Jennissen	New Democratic
40th	2011-2016	Clarence Pettersen	New Democratic
41st	2016–2019	Tom Lindsey	New Democratic
42nd	2019–2023	Tom Lindsey	New Democratic
43rd	2023–present	Tom Lindsey	New Democratic

== Election results ==
=== 2023 ===
2023 Manitoba general election
Party	Candidate	Votes	%	±%	Expenditures
New Democratic	Tom Lindsey	2,951	76.25	+13.06	$26,700.07
Progressive Conservative	Charlotte Larocque	919	23.75	-3.28	$0.00
Total valid votes/expense limit		3,870	99.21	–	$64,119.00
Total rejected and declined ballots		31	0.79	–	
Turnout		3,901	44.17	+10.26	
Eligible voters		8,832			
New Democratic hold		Swing		+8.17	
Source(s) Source: Elections Manitoba

=== 2019 ===
2019 Manitoba general election
Party	Candidate	Votes	%	±%	Expenditures
New Democratic	Tom Lindsey	3,173	63.19	30.35	$23,174.56
Progressive Conservative	Theresa Wride	1,357	27.03	-1.31	$21,639.00
Liberal	James Lindsay	299	5.95	-22.20	$2,047.30
Green	Saara Murnick	192	3.82	–	$0.00
Total valid votes		5,021	99.41	–	
Rejected		30	0.59		
Turnout		5,051	33.91		
Eligible voters		14,896			
Source(s) Source: Manitoba. Chief Electoral Officer (2019). Statement of Votes for the 42nd Provincial General Election, September 10, 2019 (PDF) (Report). Winnipeg: Elections Manitoba.

=== 2016 ===
2016 Manitoba general election
Party	Candidate	Votes	%	±%	Expenditures
New Democratic	Tom Lindsey	1,106	32.85	-24.29	$43,604.96
Progressive Conservative	Angela Enright	954	28.33	4.24	$18,686.00
Liberal	Leslie Joan Beck	948	28.16	12.74	$19,946.62
Independent	Clarence Pettersen	359	10.66	–	$6,320.44
Total valid votes		3,367	–	–	
Rejected		36	–		
Eligible voters / turnout		9,880	34.44	-0.90	
Source(s) Source: Manitoba. Chief Electoral Officer (2016). Statement of Votes for the 41st Provincial General Election, April 19, 2016 (PDF) (Report). Winnipeg: Elections Manitoba."Candidates: 41st General Election". Elections Manitoba. March 29, 2016.

=== 2011 ===
2011 Manitoba general election
Party	Candidate	Votes	%	±%	Expenditures
New Democratic	Clarence Pettersen	1,890	57.13	-20.46	$28,114.64
Progressive Conservative	Darcy Linklater	797	24.09	–	$14,069.96
Liberal	Thomas Heine	510	15.42	-6.98	$10,115.06
Green	Saara Harvie	111	3.36	–	$0.00
Total valid votes		3,308	–	–	
Rejected		17	–		
Eligible voters / turnout		9,409	35.34	-0.91	
Source(s) Source: Manitoba. Chief Electoral Officer (2011). Statement of Votes for the 40th Provincial General Election, October 4, 2011 (PDF) (Report). Winnipeg: Elections Manitoba.

=== 2007 ===
2007 Manitoba general election
Party	Candidate	Votes	%	±%	Expenditures
New Democratic	Gerard Jennissen	2,262	77.60	4.39	$10,879.75
Liberal	Garry Zanzow	653	22.40	5.42	$3,607.58
Total valid votes		2,915	–	–	
Rejected		33	–		
Eligible voters / turnout		8,133	36.25	-2.93	
Source(s) Source: Manitoba. Chief Electoral Officer (2007). Statement of Votes for the 39th Provincial General Election, May 22, 2007 (PDF) (Report). Winnipeg: Elections Manitoba.

=== 2003 ===
2003 Manitoba general election
Party	Candidate	Votes	%	±%	Expenditures
New Democratic	Gerard Jennissen	2,402	73.21	8.30	$11,470.02
Liberal	Garry Zamzow	557	16.98	–	$8,001.78
Progressive Conservative	Lloyd McDonald	322	9.81	-19.53	$210.08
Total valid votes		3,281	–	–	
Rejected		19	–		
Eligible voters / turnout		8,424	39.17	-12.43	
Source(s) Source: Manitoba. Chief Electoral Officer (2003). Statement of Votes for the 38th Provincial General Election, June 3, 2003 (PDF) (Report). Winnipeg: Elections Manitoba.

=== 1999 ===
1999 Manitoba general election
Party	Candidate	Votes	%	±%	Expenditures
New Democratic	Gerard Jennissen	3,026	64.91	12.86	$18,573.00
Progressive Conservative	Tom Therlen	1,368	29.34	-9.08	$22,044.17
Manitoba Party	Philip Ng	268	5.75	–	$1,209.00
Total valid votes		4,662	–	–	
Rejected		23	–		
Eligible voters / turnout		9,078	51.61	-5.48	
Source(s) Source: Manitoba. Chief Electoral Officer (1999). Statement of Votes for the 37th Provincial General Election, September 21, 1999 (PDF) (Report). Winnipeg: Elections Manitoba.

=== 1995 ===
1995 Manitoba general election
Party	Candidate	Votes	%	±%
New Democratic	Gerard Jennissen	2,732	52.05	-17.03
Progressive Conservative	Scott Merrell	2,017	38.43	19.70
Liberal	Florence Allen	500	9.53	-2.67
Total valid votes		5,249	–	–
Rejected		17	–	
Eligible voters / turnout		9,225	57.08	-5.43
Source(s) Source: Manitoba. Chief Electoral Officer (1999). Statement of Votes for the 37th Provincial General Election, September 21, 1999 (PDF) (Report). Winnipeg: Elections Manitoba.

=== 1990 ===
1990 Manitoba general election
Party	Candidate	Votes	%	±%
New Democratic	Jerry Storie	4,153	69.08	14.26
Progressive Conservative	Ron Black	1,126	18.73	-10.33
Liberal	Pascall Bighetty	733	12.19	-3.93
Total valid votes		6,012	–	–
Rejected		31	–	
Eligible voters / turnout		9,666	62.52	0.10
Source(s) Source: Manitoba. Chief Electoral Officer (1999). Statement of Votes for the 37th Provincial General Election, September 21, 1999 (PDF) (Report). Winnipeg: Elections Manitoba.

=== 1988 ===
1988 Manitoba general election
Party	Candidate	Votes	%	±%
New Democratic	Jerry Storie	2,948	54.82	-14.67
Progressive Conservative	Gordon Mitchell	1,563	29.06	6.60
Liberal	J. Brian King	867	16.12	8.07
Total valid votes		5,378	–	–
Rejected		16	–	
Eligible voters / turnout		8,642	62.42	6.03
Source(s) Source: Manitoba. Chief Electoral Officer (1999). Statement of Votes for the 37th Provincial General Election, September 21, 1999 (PDF) (Report). Winnipeg: Elections Manitoba.

=== 1986 ===
1986 Manitoba general election
Party	Candidate	Votes	%	±%
New Democratic	Jerry Storie	3,316	69.49	6.90
Progressive Conservative	Mary Semaniuk	1,072	22.46	-14.95
Liberal	J. Brian King	384	8.05	–
Total valid votes		4,772	–	–
Rejected		12	–	
Eligible voters / turnout		8,485	56.38	-9.32
Source(s) Source: Manitoba. Chief Electoral Officer (1999). Statement of Votes for the 37th Provincial General Election, September 21, 1999 (PDF) (Report). Winnipeg: Elections Manitoba.

=== 1981 ===
1981 Manitoba general election
Party	Candidate	Votes	%	±%
New Democratic	Jerry Storie	3,557	62.59	11.84
Progressive Conservative	Bob McNeil	2,126	37.41	-6.47
Total valid votes		5,683	–	–
Rejected		40	–	
Eligible voters / turnout		8,711	65.70	-9.64
Source(s) Source: Manitoba. Chief Electoral Officer (1999). Statement of Votes for the 37th Provincial General Election, September 21, 1999 (PDF) (Report). Winnipeg: Elections Manitoba.

=== 1977 ===
1977 Manitoba general election
Party	Candidate	Votes	%	±%
New Democratic	Thomas Barrow	2,917	50.75	-2.83
Progressive Conservative	Nyall Hyndman	2,522	43.88	12.83
Liberal	Walter Shmon	309	5.38	-10.00
Total valid votes		5,748	–	–
Rejected		37	–	
Eligible voters / turnout		7,679	75.34	1.10
Source(s) Source: Manitoba. Chief Electoral Officer (1999). Statement of Votes for the 37th Provincial General Election, September 21, 1999 (PDF) (Report). Winnipeg: Elections Manitoba.

=== 1973 ===
1973 Manitoba general election
Party	Candidate	Votes	%	±%
New Democratic	Thomas Barrow	3,112	53.58	12.65
Progressive Conservative	George Njegovan	1,803	31.04	-2.48
Liberal	Roy Veness	893	15.38	-10.17
Total valid votes		5,808	–	–
Rejected		32	–	
Eligible voters / turnout		7,867	74.23	4.38
Source(s) Source: Manitoba. Chief Electoral Officer (1999). Statement of Votes for the 37th Provincial General Election, September 21, 1999 (PDF) (Report). Winnipeg: Elections Manitoba.

=== 1969 ===
1969 Manitoba general election
Party	Candidate	Votes	%	±%
New Democratic	Thomas Barrow	2,045	40.93	13.06
Progressive Conservative	Charles Witney	1,675	33.53	-11.22
Liberal	Francis Lawrence Jobin	1,276	25.54	-1.84
Total valid votes		4,996	–	–
Rejected		19	–	
Eligible voters / turnout		7,179	69.86	-5.00
Source(s) Source: Manitoba. Chief Electoral Officer (1999). Statement of Votes for the 37th Provincial General Election, September 21, 1999 (PDF) (Report). Winnipeg: Elections Manitoba.

=== 1966 ===
1966 Manitoba general election
Party	Candidate	Votes	%	±%
Progressive Conservative	Charles Witney	1,750	44.75	-14.66
New Democratic	Scott Day	1,090	27.87	16.66
Liberal	Mickey Perepeluk	1,071	27.38	-2.01
Total valid votes		3,911	–	–
Rejected		22	–	
Eligible voters / turnout		5,254	74.86	1.90
Source(s) Source: Manitoba. Chief Electoral Officer (1999). Statement of Votes for the 37th Provincial General Election, September 21, 1999 (PDF) (Report). Winnipeg: Elections Manitoba.

=== 1962 ===
1962 Manitoba general election
Party	Candidate	Votes	%	±%
Progressive Conservative	Charles Witney	2,375	59.40	18.83
Liberal	Eli Ross	1,175	29.39	–
New Democratic	Alfred Ledieu	448	11.21	–
Total valid votes		3,998	–	–
Rejected		27	–	
Eligible voters / turnout		5,517	72.96	-5.38
Source(s) Source: Manitoba. Chief Electoral Officer (1999). Statement of Votes for the 37th Provincial General Election, September 21, 1999 (PDF) (Report). Winnipeg: Elections Manitoba.

=== 1959 ===
1959 Manitoba general election
Party	Candidate	Votes	%	±%
Progressive Conservative	Charles Witney	1,810	40.57	2.77
Liberal–Progressive	Francis Lawrence Jobin	1,728	38.74	-8.06
Co-operative Commonwealth	Frederick S. Pope	923	20.69	5.29
Total valid votes		4,461	–	–
Rejected		16	–	
Eligible voters / turnout		5,715	78.34	6.18
Source(s) Source: Manitoba. Chief Electoral Officer (1999). Statement of Votes for the 37th Provincial General Election, September 21, 1999 (PDF) (Report). Winnipeg: Elections Manitoba.

=== 1958 ===
1958 Manitoba general election
Party	Candidate	Votes	%
Liberal–Progressive	Francis Lawrence Jobin	1,935	46.80
Progressive Conservative	Charles Witney	1,563	37.80
Co-operative Commonwealth	Conrad Kerr	637	15.41
Total valid votes		4,135	–
Rejected		25	–
Eligible voters / turnout		5,765	72.16
Source(s) Source: Manitoba. Chief Electoral Officer (1999). Statement of Votes for the 37th Provincial General Election, September 21, 1999 (PDF) (Report). Winnipeg: Elections Manitoba.

== Previous boundaries ==
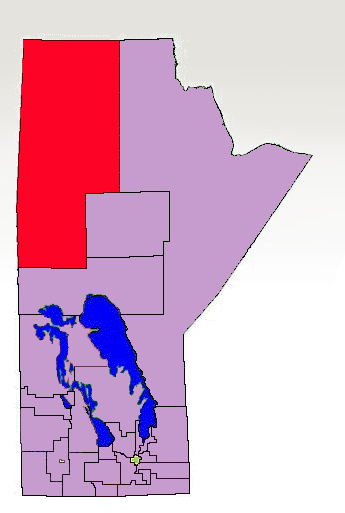
1998–2011 boundaries for Flin Flon highlighted in red

== See also ==
- List of Manitoba provincial electoral districts
- Canadian provincial electoral districts
