= Francis Laurence Jobin =

Canadian politician

The Honourable Francis Laurence Jobin

18th Lieutenant Governor of Manitoba
- In office March 15, 1976 – October 23, 1981
- Monarch: Elizabeth II
- Governors General: Jules Léger; Edward Schreyer
- Premier: Edward Schreyer; Sterling Lyon
- Preceded by: William John McKeag
- Succeeded by: Pearl McGonigal

Manitoba Minister of Industry and Commerce
- In office July 6, 1956 – June 30, 1958
- Premier: Douglas Lloyd Campbell
- Preceded by: Ronald Turner
- Succeeded by: Gurney Evans

Member of the Legislative Assembly of Manitoba for Flin Flon The Pas 1949–1958
- In office June 16, 1958 – May 14, 1959
- Preceded by: new constituency
- Succeeded by: Charles Witney
- In office November 10, 1949 – June 16, 1958
- Preceded by: Beresford Richards
- Succeeded by: John Carroll

Personal details
- Born: August 14, 1914 Winnipeg, Manitoba, Canada
- Died: August 25, 1995 (aged 81) Winnipeg, Manitoba, Canada
- Party: Liberal
- Education: University of Manitoba
- Occupation: Labourer, miner, surveyor

Francis Laurence Jobin (August 14, 1914 – August 25, 1995) was a politician and the 18th Lieutenant Governor of Manitoba, Canada.

Jobin was born in Winnipeg, and was educated at the University of Manitoba. He moved to Flin Flon, in the northern part of the province, in 1935. He worked for Hudson Bay Mining and Smelting as a labourer, miner and surveyor, later working in the company's purchasing department.

Jobin was first elected to the Legislative Assembly of Manitoba in the 1949 provincial election, as a Liberal candidate supporting the government of Premier Douglas Campbell. Running in The Pas, he easily defeated independent incumbent Beresford Richards, who opposed the governing Liberal-Conservative coalition.

Jobin was re-elected in the 1953 election, easily defeating opponents from the Co-operative Commonwealth Federation (CCF) and Social Credit. On July 6, 1956, he was sworn in as Railway Commissioner and Minister of Industry and Commerce in the Campbell government. Provincial CCF leader Lloyd Stinson later referred to Jobin as Campbell's only "labour-oriented" minister.

Campbell's Liberals were defeated by Dufferin Roblin's Progressive Conservatives in the 1958 election, but Jobin was able to retain the redistributed riding of Flin Flon. He was defeated by Progressive Conservative Charles Witney in the following year's election, however, as Roblin's Tories won a majority government.

When Campbell resigned as Manitoba Liberal Party leader in 1961, Jobin was one of four candidates who sought to replace him. He was accused by some of representing "radical" elements within the party, though he denied this, using his friendship with the arch-conservative Campbell as evidence. Jobin was a somewhat marginal candidate, however, and received only 79 votes in the leadership convention, compared to 475 for the winner, Gildas Molgat.

Jobin ran as a Liberal candidate in the sprawling northern riding of Churchill in the federal election of 1962, but finished a distant second against Progressive Conservative candidate Robert Simpson. In early 1963, he lost a deferred provincial election in Churchill to Progressive Conservative Gordon Beard, albeit by a relatively close margin. Jobin again lost to Simpson in the federal election of 1965.

Jobin was elected to the Flin Flon Municipal Council in 1966. He made another bid for the provincial legislature in the 1969 election, this time finishing third against Witney and the successful New Democratic candidate, Thomas Barrow. Jobin received a Centennial Medal from the Manitoba Historical Society in 1970, and continued his work on the municipal council. In October 1974, he was elected mayor of Flin Flon.

On March 15, 1976, Jobin was sworn in as the Lieutenant Governor of Manitoba. He served in this position until October 23, 1981. He died in Winnipeg on August 25, 1995.
