= Progressive Conservative Party of Manitoba candidates in the 1966 Manitoba general election =

The Progressive Conservative Party of Manitoba ran a full slate of fifty-seven candidates in the 1966 provincial election, and elected thirty-six members to form their third consecutive majority government. Many of the party's candidates have their own biography pages; information about others may be found here.

This page also includes information about Progressive Conservative candidates in by-elections between 1966 and 1969.

== by-elections ==
=== Churchill, 20 February 1969: Michael Klewchuk ===
Michael Klewchuk was raised and educated in Yorkton, Saskatchewan, and moved to Flin Flon, Manitoba in 1958. He later moved to Snow Lake in 1965, where he was a merchant and was active with the local Chamber of Commerce. He once took part in a delegation to Ottawa to investigate possibilities for television development in northern Manitoba. Newspaper coverage from the by-election indicates that he ran a low-key campaign in 1969. He received 1,109 votes (13.74%), finishing fourth against New Democratic Party candidate Joseph Borowski.
