= Clarence Pettersen =

Canadian politician

Member of the Legislative Assembly of Manitoba for Flin Flon
- In office October 4, 2011 – April 19, 2016
- Preceded by: Gerard Jennissen
- Succeeded by: Tom Lindsey

Personal details
- Born: July 25, 1952
- Died: March 28, 2018 (aged 65) Flin Flon, Manitoba
- Party: New Democrat
- Spouse: Judy
- Education: Brandon University
- Occupation: Educator

Clarence Pettersen (July 25, 1952 – March 28, 2018) was a Canadian provincial politician, who was elected to the Legislative Assembly of Manitoba in the 2011 election. He represented the electoral district of Flin Flon as a member of the Manitoba New Democratic Party caucus.

Pettersen lost the Flin Flon constituency renomination in December 2015, and announced his candidacy as an independent candidate for the April 19, 2016, provincial election on March 15, 2016. Pettersen was defeated in the 2016 election by NDP candidate Tom Lindsey. Pettersen finished fourth in the riding, coming behind the NDP, Progressive Conservative, and Liberal candidates. After being diagnosed with terminal cancer, Pettersen chose medical assistance in dying (MAID) and died March 28, 2018, at the age of 65.

== Electoral history ==
2016 Manitoba general election: Flin Flon
Party	Candidate	Votes	%	±%	Expenditures
New Democratic	Tom Lindsey	1,106	32.85	-24.29	$43,604.96
Progressive Conservative	Angela Enright	954	28.33	4.24	$18,686.00
Liberal	Leslie Joan Beck	948	28.16	12.74	$19,946.62
Independent	Clarence Pettersen	359	10.66	–	$6,320.44
Total valid votes		3,367	–	–	
Rejected		36	–		
Eligible voters / turnout		9,880	34.44	-0.90	
Source(s) Source: Manitoba. Chief Electoral Officer (2016). Statement of Votes for the 41st Provincial General Election, April 19, 2016 (PDF) (Report). Winnipeg: Elections Manitoba."Candidates: 41st General Election". Elections Manitoba. March 29, 2016.

2011 Manitoba general election: Flin Flon
Party	Candidate	Votes	%	±%	Expenditures
New Democratic	Clarence Pettersen	1,890	57.13	-20.46	$28,114.64
Progressive Conservative	Darcy Linklater	797	24.09	–	$14,069.96
Liberal	Thomas Heine	510	15.42	-6.98	$10,115.06
Green	Saara Harvie	111	3.36	–	$0.00
Total valid votes		3,308	–	–	
Rejected		17	–		
Eligible voters / turnout		9,409	35.34	-0.91	
Source(s) Source: Manitoba. Chief Electoral Officer (2011). Statement of Votes for the 40th Provincial General Election, October 4, 2011 (PDF) (Report). Winnipeg: Elections Manitoba.
