= Jerry Storie =

Canadian politician

Member of the Legislative Assembly of Manitoba for Flin Flon
- In office November 17, 1981 – July 20, 1994
- Preceded by: Thomas Barrow
- Succeeded by: Gerard Jennissen

Personal details
- Born: March 23, 1950 (age 76) Winnipeg, Manitoba, Canada
- Party: New Democratic Party of Manitoba
- Spouse: Betty Louise Embury

Jerry Thomas Storie (born March 23, 1950) is a politician in Manitoba, Canada. He was a member of the Legislative Assembly of Manitoba from 1981 to 1994, and a cabinet minister in the New Democratic Party government of Howard Pawley from 1982 to 1988.

He was born in Winnipeg, Manitoba, the son of Clifford Earl Storie and Iris Eloise Young, and was educated at Brandon University and the University of Manitoba. In 1970, Storie married Betty Louise Embury. (She died in March 2007.) They moved to Flin Flon in 1975 and he worked as a teacher and sociologist for the Flin Flon School Division before entering public life.

Storie was first elected to the Manitoba legislature in the 1981 general election, defeating Progressive Conservative Bob McNeil by over 1400 votes in the northern riding of Flin Flon. He entered the cabinet on August 20, 1982, having been appointed Minister of Housing, with responsibility for the Landlord and Tenant Act, the Residential Rent Corporation Act, the Housing and Renewal Corporation Act and the Infirm Persons' Housing Act.

Following a cabinet shuffle on November 4, 1983, Storie was named Minister of Northern Affairs with responsibility for the Communities Economic Development Fund Act, the Manitoba Natural Resources Act, and Manitoba Forestry Resources Ltd. He was relieved of the Northern Affairs portfolio and the first two responsibilities on January 30, 1985, and named Minister of Business Development and Tourism, with responsibility for Manitoba Data Services (he also retained the Forestry responsibility).

Storie was re-elected by a substantial majority in the 1986 provincial election. On April 17, 1986, he was promoted to Minister of Education, and on September 21, 1987 was again shifted to the Ministry of Energy and Mines, with responsibility for Manitoba Hydro and the Natural Resources Development Act. On November 23, 1987, he was also given responsibility for the Natural Gas Supply Act. Throughout his second term in office, he retained responsibility for Forestry.

The NDP government of Howard Pawley was defeated in 1988, when disgruntled backbencher Jim Walding voted against his government's budget. The party was reduced to only twelve seats (out of fifty-seven) in the election which followed, although Storie was re-elected in his riding without any serious difficulties. He was again re-elected in the 1990 provincial election, in which the NDP recovered to twenty seats. He retired from the legislature on July 20, 1994. He returned to the field of education as Area 4 Superintendent for the Frontier School Division in Cranberry Portage, Manitoba throughout the late 1990s.

In 2001, Storie negotiated on behalf of Manitoba's provincial government in a dispute with the Canadian federal government over hydro resources. He later became Superintendent of the Turtle Mountain school division in Manitoba. Storie was appointed the Dean of Education at Brandon University in 2005.
