= Danielle Adams (politician) =

Canadian politician (1983–2021)

Critic, Childcare; Housing; Disability; and Poverty Matters
- In office September 27, 2019 – December 9, 2021
- Leader: Wab Kinew

Member of the Legislative Assembly of Manitoba for Thompson
- In office September 10, 2019 – December 9, 2021
- Preceded by: Kelly Bindle
- Succeeded by: Eric Redhead

Personal details
- Born: Danielle Lynn Adams; September 24, 1983 Edmonton, Alberta, Canada
- Died: December 9, 2021 (aged 38) near Ponton, Manitoba, Canada
- Party: New Democratic Party of Manitoba
- Spouse: Bill
- Children: 2

Danielle Lynn Adams (September 24, 1983 – December 9, 2021) was a Canadian politician, who was elected to the Legislative Assembly of Manitoba in the 2019 Manitoba general election. She represented the electoral district of Thompson as a member of the New Democratic Party of Manitoba.

Prior to her election to the provincial legislature, she worked as a constituency assistant to Niki Ashton, the federal New Democratic Party Member of Parliament for Churchill—Keewatinook Aski. Adams was the first woman to represent Thompson as an MLA.

On December 9, 2021, Adams died at the age of 38 in a motor vehicle crash while driving south to Winnipeg on Manitoba Highway 6 after her SUV collided with a northbound semi-truck, 50 kilometres south of Ponton, Manitoba.

== Electoral record ==
2019 Manitoba general election: Thompson
Party	Candidate	Votes	%	±%	Expenditures
New Democratic	Danielle Adams	2,686	54.55	+16.1	$13,643.39
Progressive Conservative	Kelly Bindle	1,757	35.68	-4.8	$37,215.90
Green	Meagan Jemmett	298	6.05		$0.00
Liberal	Darla Contois	183	3.72	-17.2	$0.00
Total valid votes		4,924	99.58		
Total rejected ballots		21	0.42		
Turnout		4,945	37.27		
Eligible voters		13,267			
New Democratic gain from Progressive Conservative		Swing		+10.5	
