= Thompson (electoral district) =

Provincial electoral district in Manitoba, Canada

Coordinates: 55.590°N 97.976°W

Manitoba electoral district
- Riding boundary from 2011 until 2019.

Provincial electoral district
- Legislature: Legislative Assembly of Manitoba
MLA
Eric Redhead
New Democratic
- District created: 1968
- First contested: 1969
- Last contested: 2023

Demographics
- Population (2016): 22,380
- Electors (2022): 10,706
- Area (km²): 134,661
- Pop. density (per km²): 0.17
- Census division(s): Division No. 21, Division No. 22, Division No. 23
- Census subdivision(s): Churchill, Division No. 21, Unorganized, Division No. 22, Unorganized, Division No. 23, Unorganized, Fox Lake 2, Gillam, Ilford, Mooseocoot, Mystery Lake, Nelson House 170, Split Lake 171, Thompson, York Landing

Thompson is a provincial electoral district in the Canadian province of Manitoba. It was created by redistribution in 1968 from parts of Churchill and Rupertsland (now Keewatinook), and has formally existed since the provincial election of 1969.

Thompson is in northern Manitoba. It is bordered by Keewatinook to the east and Flin Flon to the west. The city of Thompson, which was incorporated shortly before the riding's creation, is its only major urban centre. Almost half of the riding's residents live in that community.

The riding's population in 1996 was 19,349. In 1999, the average family income was $56,402, and the unemployment rate was 12.60%. The riding's economic character is primarily working-class, with 17% of its economy coming from the mining sector.

Forty-two per cent of the riding's residents are aboriginal, the third highest rate in the province.

Thompson is usually considered safe for the New Democratic Party, which represented the riding almost continually since its creation. The current MLA is New Democrat Eric Redhead, who was elected in the provincial by-election on June 7, 2022. His predecessor Danielle Adams was previously elected in the 2019 Manitoba general election on September 10, 2019, and served until her death on December 9, 2021.

== Members of the Legislative Assembly ==
Assembly	Years	Member	Party
Riding created from Churchill and Rupertsland
29th	1969–1972	Joseph Borowski	New Democratic
29th	1972–1973	Joseph Borowski	Independent
30th	1973–1977	Ken Dillen	New Democratic
31st	1977–1981	Ken MacMaster	Progressive Conservative
32nd	1981–1986	Steve Ashton	New Democratic
33rd	1986–1988	Steve Ashton	New Democratic
34th	1988–1990	Steve Ashton	New Democratic
35th	1990–1995	Steve Ashton	New Democratic
36th	1995–1999	Steve Ashton	New Democratic
37th	1999–2003	Steve Ashton	New Democratic
38th	2003–2007	Steve Ashton	New Democratic
39th	2007–2011	Steve Ashton	New Democratic
40th	2011–2016	Steve Ashton	New Democratic
41st	2016–2019	Kelly Bindle	Progressive Conservative
42nd	2019–2021	Danielle Adams	New Democratic
42nd	2022–2023	Eric Redhead	New Democratic
43rd	2023–present	Eric Redhead	New Democratic

== Electoral results ==
2023 Manitoba general election
Party	Candidate	Votes	%	±%	Expenditures
New Democratic	Eric Redhead	2,887	68.28	+13.73	$15,331.43
Progressive Conservative	Linda Markus	1,214	28.71	-6.97	$14,161.66
Liberal	Roy Jemison	127	3.00	-0.71	$0.00
Total valid votes/expense limit		4,228	99.55	–	$73,108.00
Total rejected and declined ballots		19	0.45	–	
Turnout		4,247	36.10	-1.17	
Eligible voters		11,765			
New Democratic hold		Swing		+10.35	
Source(s) Source: Elections Manitoba

Manitoba provincial by-election, June 7, 2022 Death of Danielle Adams
Party	Candidate	Votes	%	±%
New Democratic	Eric Redhead	1,465	71.60	+17.05
Progressive Conservative	Charlotte Larocque	581	28.40	-7.28
Total valid votes		2,053	98.80	
Total rejected ballots		25	1.20	+0.78
Turnout		2,071	19.75	-17.57
Eligible voters		10,528		
New Democratic hold		Swing		+12.44
Source: Elections Manitoba

2019 Manitoba general election
Party	Candidate	Votes	%	±%	Expenditures
New Democratic	Danielle Adams	2,686	54.55	+16.1	$13,643.39
Progressive Conservative	Kelly Bindle	1,757	35.68	-4.8	$37,215.90
Green	Meagan Jemmett	298	6.05		$0.00
Liberal	Darla Contois	183	3.72	-17.2	$0.00
Total valid votes		4,924	99.58		
Total rejected ballots		21	0.42		
Turnout		4,945	37.27		
Eligible voters		13,267			
New Democratic gain from Progressive Conservative		Swing		+10.5	

2016 provincial election redistributed results
Party	%
Progressive Conservative	40.5
New Democratic	38.4
Liberal	20.9
Independent	0.1

2016 Manitoba general election
Party	Candidate	Votes	%	±%	Expenditures
Progressive Conservative	Kelly Bindle	1,712	44.16	+15.86	$11,544.03
New Democratic	Steve Ashton	1,527	39.39	-29.14	$17,980.87
Liberal	Inez Vystrcil-Spence	638	16.46	+13.28	$7,318.95
Total valid votes/expense limit		3,877	99.13		$32,545.00
Total rejected ballots		34	0.87	+0.39	
Turnout		3,911	37.36	+0.64	
Eligible voters		10,469			
Progressive Conservative gain from New Democratic		Swing		+22.50	
Source: Elections Manitoba

2011 Manitoba general election
Party	Candidate	Votes	%	±%	Expenditures
New Democratic	Steve Ashton	2,586	68.52	−5.38	$11,696.80
Progressive Conservative	Anita Campbell	1,068	28.30	+18.17	$16,809.87
Liberal	Ken Dillen	120	3.18	−12.79	$462.91
Total valid votes		3,774	99.53		
Rejected and declined votes		18	0.47	-0.15	
Turnout		3,792	36.72	−3.10	
Registered voters		10,328			
New Democratic hold		Swing		-11.78	

2007 Manitoba general election
Party	Candidate	Votes	%	±%	Expenditures
New Democratic	Steve Ashton	3,036	73.90	-8.83	$9,356.43
Liberal	Kenny Braun	656	15.97	+12.07	$7,377.03
Progressive Conservative	Cory Phillips	416	10.13	-3.25	$688.99
Total valid votes		4,108	99.37		
Rejected and declined votes		26	0.63	-0.05	
Turnout		4,134	39.82	+2.28	
Registered voters		10,382			
New Democratic hold		Swing		-10.45	

2003 Manitoba general election
Party	Candidate	Votes	%	±%	Expenditures
New Democratic	Steve Ashton	3,291	82.73	+11.74	$9,804.99
Progressive Conservative	Bill Archer	532	13.37	-11.07	$2,448.27
Liberal	Myrle Traverse	155	3.90	-0.67	$627.36
Total valid votes/Expense limit		3,978	99.33		$
Total rejected ballots		27	0.67	+0.10	
Turnout		4,005	37.54	-16.86	
Eligible voters		10,669			
New Democratic hold		Swing		+11.40	
Source: Elections Manitoba

1999 Manitoba general election
Party	Candidate	Votes	%	±%	Expenditures
New Democratic	Steve Ashton	3,793	70.99	+9.29	$7,846.00
Progressive Conservative	Cecil Thorne	1,306	24.44	+1.94	$20,487.52
Liberal	Pascal Bighetty	244	4.57	-11.22	$2,661.92
Total valid votes		5,343	99.42		
Rejected and declined votes		31	0.58	+0.25	
Turnout		5,374	54.40	−0.47	
Registered voters		9,879			
New Democratic hold		Swing		+3.67	

1995 Manitoba general election
Party	Candidate	Votes	%	±%
New Democratic	Steve Ashton	3,619	61.71	+1.78
Progressive Conservative	Chuck Shabe	1,320	22.51	-7.36
Liberal	Tim Johnston	926	15.79	+5.58
Total valid votes		5,865	99.68	
Rejected and declined votes		19	0.32	-0.03
Turnout		5,884	54.87	-8.18
Registered voters		10,724		
New Democratic hold		Swing		+4.57
Source: Elections Manitoba

1990 Manitoba general election
Party	Candidate	Votes	%	±%
New Democratic	Steve Ashton	4,099	59.93	+11.83
Progressive Conservative	Loretta Clarke	2,043	29.87	-2.10
Liberal	Don McIvor	698	10.20	-9.73
Total valid votes		6,840	99.65	
Rejected and declined votes		24	0.35	+0.16
Turnout		6,864	63.05	-10.11
Registered voters		10,887		
New Democratic hold		Swing		+6.97
Source: Elections Manitoba

1988 Manitoba general election
Party	Candidate	Votes	%	±%
New Democratic	Steve Ashton	2,992	48.10	-18.51
Progressive Conservative	Ken Collin	1,989	31.97	+6.07
Liberal	Janice Pronteau	1,240	19.93	+12.45
Total valid votes		6,221	99.81	
Rejected and declined votes		12	0.19	-0.08
Turnout		6,233	73.16	+1.66
Registered voters		8,520		
New Democratic hold		Swing		-12.29
Source: Elections Manitoba

1986 Manitoba general election
Party	Candidate	Votes	%	±%
New Democratic	Steve Ashton	3,852	66.61	+17.17
Progressive Conservative	Ken Biglow	1,498	25.90	-22.30
Liberal	George Printeau	433	7.49	+5.13
Total valid votes		5,783	99.72	
Rejected and declined votes		16	0.28	-0.03
Turnout		5,799	71.50	-9.14
Registered voters		8,111		
New Democratic hold		Swing		+19.74
Source: Elections Manitoba

1981 Manitoba general election
Party	Candidate	Votes	%	±%
New Democratic	Steve Ashton	2,890	49.44	+7.69
Progressive Conservative	Ken MacMaster	2,818	48.20	-6.16
Liberal	Cy Hennessey	138	2.36	-1.54
Total valid votes		5,846	99.69	
Rejected and declined votes		18	0.31	-0.13
Turnout		5,864	80.64	+13.02
Registered voters		7,272		
New Democratic gain from Progressive Conservative		Swing		+6.92
Source: Elections Manitoba

1977 Manitoba general election
Party	Candidate	Votes	%	±%
Progressive Conservative	Ken MacMaster	3,947	54.36	+20.41
New Democratic	Ken Dillen	3,031	41.74	+4.21
Liberal	Oliver James Monkman	283	3.90	-24.62
Total valid votes		7,261	99.56	
Rejected and declined votes		32	0.44	-0.01
Turnout		7,293	67.62	-3.68
Registered voters		10,786		
Progressive Conservative gain from New Democratic		Swing		+8.10
Source: Elections Manitoba

1973 Manitoba general election
Party	Candidate	Votes	%
New Democratic	Ken Dillen	2,742	37.54
Progressive Conservative	Anna Denby	2,480	33.95
Liberal	Blain Johnston	2,083	28.51
Total valid votes		7,305	100.00
Rejected votes		33	
Turnout		7,338	71.30
Electors on the lists		10,292	

== Previous boundaries ==
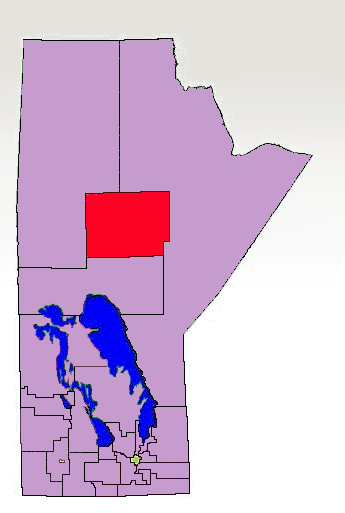
The 1998–2011 boundaries for Thompson highlighted in red.

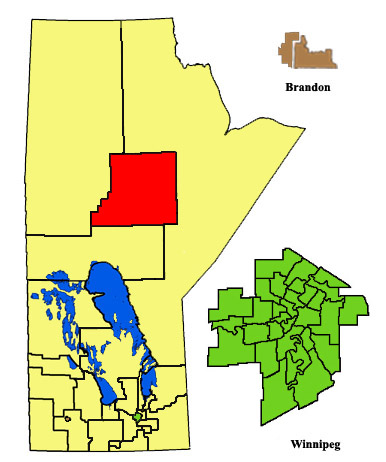
The 2011–2019 boundaries for Thompson highlighted in red.

== See also ==
- List of Manitoba provincial electoral districts
- Canadian provincial electoral districts
