= Gerard Jennissen =

Canadian politician

Member of the Legislative Assembly of Manitoba for Flin Flon
- In office April 25, 1995 – October 4, 2011
- Preceded by: Jerry Storie
- Succeeded by: Clarence Pettersen

Personal details
- Party: Manitoba New Democratic Party

Gerard Jennissen (born February 22, 1942) is an educator and former politician in Manitoba, Canada. He was a member of the Manitoba legislature from 1995 to 2011.

The son of Johannes Jennissen and Elizabeth Houben, he was born in Slek-Echt, in the province of Limburg in the Netherlands. His family emigrated to Selnac, Saskatchewan in 1952, where his father worked as a farmer. Jennissen graduated from the University of Saskatchewan in 1966 with degrees in Arts and Education, and received a Master of Arts degree in Communication in 1969. He taught English at Rose Valley High School in Saskatchewan for three years, and worked for Frontier Collegiate Institute from 1972 to 1994. In 1970, he married Lisa Sonnen. He has also been involved in several peace and justice organizations operating in the third world.

Jennissen became involved in the New Democratic Party in the early 1960s, after hearing Tommy Douglas speak in Saskatchewan. He continued his NDP affiliation after moving to Manitoba.

In the 1995 election, Jennissen was elected to the Manitoba Legislature for the northern Manitoba constituency of Flin Flon, defeating Progressive Conservative Scott Merrell, 2732 votes to 2017. Also in 1995, he supported Lorne Nystrom's bid to lead the federal New Democratic Party.

He was re-elected by a wider margin in the 1999 election, and received over 73% support in the 2003 election. Jennissen was the NDP critic for Highways and Transportation between 1995 and 1999, but was not appointed to cabinet when the NDP formed government in 1999.

In 2000, he was appointed to the Manitoba Hydro Board. In 2003, he supported Bill Blaikie's campaign to lead the federal NDP.

He was re-elected in the 2007 provincial election. Jennissen did not run for reelection in 2011.
