= Minister of Industry and Commerce (Manitoba) =

The Minister of Industry and Commerce is a former cabinet position in the province of Manitoba, Canada.

The department's origins can be traced back to 1932, when John Stewart McDiarmid was appointed as minister of Mines and Natural Resources, and for Industry. The department was renamed as "Industry and Commerce" in 1940.

The position was eliminated in 1978, and its responsibilities dispersed among other departments.

== List of ministers of industry and commerce ==
Name	Party	Took office	Left office
John Stewart McDiarmid(*)	Liberal-Progressive	May 27, 1932	June 30, 1953
Ronald Turner	Liberal-Progressive	June 30, 1953	July 6, 1956
Francis Bud Jobin	Liberal-Progressive	July 6, 1956	June 30, 1958
Gurney Evans	Progressive Conservative	June 30, 1958	July 22, 1966
Sidney Spivak	Progressive Conservative	July 22, 1966	July 15, 1969
Edward Schreyer	New Democratic Party	July 15, 1969	December 18, 1969
Leonard Evans	New Democratic Party	December 18, 1969	October 24, 1977
Robert Banman	Progressive Conservative	October 24, 1977	October 20, 1978
