= Les Osland =

Canadian politician

Member of the Legislative Assembly of Manitoba for Churchill
- In office June 28, 1973 – October 11, 1977
- Preceded by: Gordon Beard
- Succeeded by: Jay Cowan

Personal details
- Born: April 4, 1921 Portage la Prairie, Manitoba, Canada
- Died: March 2, 1993 (aged 71) Spruce Grove, Alberta, Canada
- Party: New Democratic Party of Manitoba

Les Osland (April 4, 1921 – March 2, 1993) was a politician in Manitoba, Canada. He was a New Democratic member of the Legislative Assembly of Manitoba from 1973 to 1977, representing the northern riding of Churchill.

Osland's father refused to serve in World War I, and his family was somewhat unpopular in their small prairie town during the 1920s.

He was elected in the provincial election of 1973, defeating Progressive Conservative candidate Andy Champagne by just under 700 votes. He served as a government backbencher for the next four years, and did not seek re-election in 1977.

Osland later served as mayor of Churchill.

His son, Len Osland, is a folk music singer/songwriter in the Yukon. In 1997, the younger Osland released a CD entitled Salty Fingers which included the song "Pop", a tribute to his father.
