= Jay Cowan =

Canadian politician (1946–2022)

Member of the Legislative Assembly of Manitoba for Churchill
- In office October 11, 1977 – September 11, 1990
- Preceded by: Les Osland

Personal details
- Born: July 31, 1946 Chicago, Illinois, U.S.
- Died: January 23, 2022 (aged 75) Winnipeg, Manitoba, Canada
- Party: New Democratic Party of Manitoba

Jay Marine Cowan (July 31, 1946 – January 23, 2022) was a politician in Manitoba, Canada. He was a member of the Legislative Assembly of Manitoba from 1977 to 1990, and a cabinet minister in the government of Howard Pawley from 1981 to 1988.

Born in Chicago, Cowan left the United States of America during the Vietnam War to avoid that nation's military draft. In Canada, he worked as a miner and organizer for the social democratic New Democratic Party. He was a member of the United Steelworkers of America during this period.

In 1977, Cowan was sent by Manitoba NDP leader Edward Schreyer to the northern riding of Churchill to scout for suitable candidates. Perhaps contrary to Schreyer's expectations, he secured the nomination for himself (despite the fact that he was not yet a Canadian citizen) and was duly returned in the general election that followed, defeating Progressive Conservative Mark Ingebrigtson by about 300 votes.

In 1979, Cowan was one of the most prominent supporters of Howard Pawley in the latter's successful bid to succeed Schreyer as party leader. Cowan was re-elected in the general election of 1981 (this time defeating Ingebrigtson by around 1350 votes); the NDP won the election, and he was appointed Minister of Northern Affairs on November 30, 1981, with responsibility for Environmental Management, the Clean Environment Act, the Workers Compensation Act, the Workplace Safety and Health Act, and the Communities Economic Development Fund Act.

Following a cabinet shuffle on November 4, 1983, Cowan was named Minister of Co-operative Development and Chairman of the Treasury Board. He was again re-elected without difficulty in the general election of 1986.

On April 17, 1986, Cowan was relieved of his position with the Treasury Board and was named government house leader. He continued to serve as Minister of Co-operative Development, and was also the Minister of Native Affairs (without portfolio) responsible for the Natural Gas Supply Act from September 21, 1987 to November 23, 1987.

The NDP were unexpectedly defeated in the legislature in 1988, after disgruntled backbencher Jim Walding voted with the opposition in a narrowly divided house. Cowan was one of only twelve New Democrats (in a 57-member house) to be returned in the 1988 general election. In opposition, he opposed the proposed labour reforms of Progressive Conservative Premier Gary Filmon. He chose not to seek re-election in 1990.

Cowan was director of special projects at the Anokiiwin Training Institute, working with aboriginal groups in Manitoba and northwestern Ontario. As of 2003, he was also the chair of the Manitoba Federation of Labour's health and safety committee. Cowan died on January 23, 2022.
