= Thomas Barrow (politician) =

Canadian politician (1916–1982)

Member of the Legislative Assembly of Manitoba for Flin Flon
- In office June 25, 1969 – November 17, 1981
- Preceded by: Charles Witney
- Succeeded by: Jerry Storie

Personal details
- Born: October 7, 1916 Ryhope, England
- Died: June 14, 1982 (aged 65) Winnipeg, Manitoba, Canada
- Party: New Democratic Party of Manitoba
- Spouse: Hazel Evelyn Nelson (m. 1940)

Thomas Aidan Barrow (October 7, 1916 – June 14, 1982) was a politician in Manitoba, Canada. He was a New Democratic member of the Legislative Assembly of Manitoba from 1969 to 1981.

The son of Thomas Aidan Barrow and Jean Bond, Barrow was born in Ryhope, England and was educated in England and in Springhill, Nova Scotia. He later moved to northern Manitoba and worked as a miner. In 1940, Barrow married Hazel Evelyn Nelson.

He was first elected to the Manitoba legislature in the provincial election of 1969, defeating incumbent Progressive Conservative Charles Witney by 370 votes. He was re-elected by a greater margin in the 1973 election and retained the seat against a strong Tory challenge in the 1977 election. He was not called to join the cabinet of Edward Schreyer.

In 1979, Barrow supported Sidney Green's bid to become interim leader of the provincial NDP. He did not run in the 1981 election, and died shortly thereafter.
