= Eric Redhead =

21st-century Canadian politician

Eric Redhead MLA

Member of the Legislative Assembly of Manitoba for Thompson
- Incumbent
- Assumed office June 7, 2022
- Preceded by: Danielle Adams

Acting Grand Chief of the Assembly of Manitoba Chiefs
- In office March 21, 2022 – April 18, 2022
- Preceded by: Arlen Dumas
- Succeeded by: Cornell McLean

Personal details
- Born: April 10, 1986 (age 40) Thompson, Manitoba, Canada
- Party: New Democratic

Eric Redhead is a Canadian politician, who was elected to the Legislative Assembly of Manitoba in a by-election in 2022. Before entering provincial politics, Redhead served two terms as chief of the Shamattawa First Nation, and briefly served as acting Grand Chief of the Assembly of Manitoba Chiefs. He represents the electoral district of Thompson as a member of the New Democratic Party of Manitoba.

== Electoral history ==
2023 Manitoba general election: Thompson
| Party | Candidate | Votes | % | ±% | Expenditures |
|---|---|---|---|---|---|
| New Democratic | Eric Redhead | 2,887 | 68.28 | +13.73 | $15,331.43 |
| Progressive Conservative | Linda Markus | 1,214 | 28.71 | -6.97 | $14,161.66 |
| Liberal | Roy Jemison | 127 | 3.00 | -0.71 | $0.00 |
| Total valid votes/expense limit | | 4,228 | 99.55 | – | $73,108.00 |
| Total rejected and declined ballots | | 19 | 0.45 | – | |
| Turnout | | 4,247 | 36.10 | -1.17 | |
| Eligible voters | | 11,765 | | | |
| New Democratic hold | | Swing | | +10.35 | |
Source(s) Source: Elections Manitoba

Manitoba provincial by-election, June 7, 2022: Thompson Death of Danielle Adams
| Party | Candidate | Votes | % | ±% |
|---|---|---|---|---|
| New Democratic | Eric Redhead | 1,465 | 71.60 | +17.05 |
| Progressive Conservative | Charlotte Larocque | 581 | 28.40 | -7.28 |
| Total valid votes | | 2,053 | 98.80 | |
| Total rejected ballots | | 25 | 1.20 | +0.78 |
| Turnout | | 2,071 | 19.75 | -17.57 |
| Eligible voters | | 10,528 | | |
| New Democratic hold | | Swing | | +12.44 |
Source: Elections Manitoba
