= Joe Borowski (politician) =

Canadian politician

Member of the Legislative Assembly of Manitoba for Thompson
- In office June 25, 1969 – June 28, 1973
- Preceded by: First member
- Succeeded by: Ken Dillen

Member of the Legislative Assembly of Manitoba for Churchill
- In office February 20, 1969 – June 25, 1969
- Preceded by: Gordon Beard
- Succeeded by: Gordon Beard

Personal details
- Born: December 12, 1932 Wishart, Saskatchewan, Canada
- Died: September 23, 1996 (aged 63) Winnipeg, Manitoba, Canada
- Party: New Democratic Party of Manitoba

Joseph Paul Borowski (December 12, 1932 – September 23, 1996) was a Canadian politician and activist. From 1969 to 1971, he was a cabinet minister in Manitoba Premier Edward Schreyer's New Democratic Party (NDP) government. Subsequently, he gained national fame for his opposition to abortion.

== Early life ==
Borowski was born in Wishart, Saskatchewan, and was educated at Birchcreek School in that province. He subsequently moved to Sudbury, Ontario, and Thompson, Manitoba, to work as a miner and steelworker. Borowski was vice-president of the United Steelworkers of America Local 6166 in 1964–65, and helped to win municipal incorporation for Thompson at around the same time. He retired from manual labour in his 30s, and became the owner of a gift shop.

== Political career ==
Borowski became a public figure in Manitoba during the late 1960s, when he camped outside the Legislative Assembly of Manitoba in extremely cold weather on two separate occasions. His first such action, in 1965, was intended as a protest against the lack of free municipal elections in Thompson. The following year, he stayed outside the legislature for sixty-five days to protest the pay increases awarded to Premier Roblin and his cabinet. His presence was a nuisance to many in government, and cabinet minister Stewart McLean eventually had him ejected from the legislative grounds. He was later arrested on three separate occasions for refusing to collect the provincial sales tax in his store.

Borowski had not been directly involved in politics prior to this experience. He had supported John Diefenbaker's Progressive Conservatives for a time at the federal level, but was not directly involved in partisan politics, and does not appear to have contemplated running for public office. He had become a local celebrity through his protest, however, and was drafted by the Manitoba NDP to campaign in a February 1969 by-election in the northern riding of Churchill. He won the party's nomination over Archie Nabess, and defeated independent candidate Blain Johnston by sixteen votes (confirmed by a recount) in the general election. He returned to the legislature in March 1969, to join the NDP caucus on the opposition benches. Borowski endorsed Sidney Green for the party's leadership in May 1969.

He was easily re-elected in the province's general election of 1969 (held in June), defeating Progressive Conservative Thomas Farrell by almost a thousand votes in Thompson.

When the NDP formed a minority government following the 1969 election, Schreyer surprised many by appointing Borowski as his Minister of Transportation. Borowski represented northern interests in the cabinet, and was also seen as an important populist link between the NDP and working class voters. Russell Doern, who joined cabinet in 1970, later claimed that Borowski's popularity rivalled that of the Premier during this period. On September 3, 1970, Borowski was given the additional position of Minister of Public Works.

There are conflicting views as to Borowski's performance in cabinet. Some claim that he was a committed Public Works Minister, who often conducted personal inspections of road renewal projects and demanded efficient results. Others allege that he treated provincial bureaucrats with contempt, and ran his ministries in a highly centralized manner. Assessments of his job performance, however, were soon overshadowed by controversies unrelated to his ministerial duties.

On February 17, 1971, Borowski made derogatory comments about aboriginal Canadians, veterans and people with disabilities during an address to NDP supporters in Winnipeg. Former party leader Russell Paulley openly criticized his remarks, and Borowski was nearly dropped from cabinet before agreeing to a public apology.

Borowski was known for his social conservatism on subjects such as pornography and abortion, and frequently expressed his views on these subjects in public debate. He was dropped from cabinet on September 8, 1971, after making several intemperate remarks on the subject of abortion, which included mocking a group of protesters who had arrived on the legislative grounds to support abortion services. As a backbencher, he tried to prevent public funds from being spent on hospitals which provided out-of-province abortion referrals.

Borowski finally left the NDP caucus on June 25, 1972, arguing that the Schreyer government's new film censorship board would not adequately prevent pornographic movies from entering the province. He initially sat as an "independent New Democrat", and later left the NDP entirely.

In the provincial election of 1973, Borowski ran as an independent candidate in the north-end Winnipeg riding of Point Douglas, and lost to NDP incumbent Donald Malinowski by more than 2,500 votes. Borowski's campaign was based almost entirely on an anti-abortion platform. He never ran for public office again after this loss. After briefly supporting Pierre Trudeau's Liberal government in the mid-1970s, Borowski abandoned partisan politics entirely. In later years, he criticized all major parties as ineffective on issues such as abortion.

== Activism ==
Shortly before the 1977 provincial election, Borowski placed a large advertisement in the Winnipeg Free Press which purported to describe the views of several MLAs on the subject of abortion. Not all of his information was accurate. MLAs whom Borowski believed were supporters of abortion were listed as "pro-death". Schreyer was described as ambivalent. Borowski was active in this period as the co-ordinator of Campaign Life in Manitoba and remained active with the group for the rest of his life.

In addition to his activities as an anti-abortion spokesman, Borowski also became an insurance salesman and a proponent of health foods in the late 1970s. In 1977, he published a work entitled The Borowski Cookbook. He withheld his income tax for five years in the 1970s, to show his opposition to Canada's federal abortion policies.

In 1981, Borowski went on an eighty-day hunger strike to protest the absence of a provision for the unborn in Canada's Charter of Rights and Freedoms. The public effect of this demonstration was blunted somewhat when it was pointed out that he had outlived contemporary IRA hunger-striker Bobby Sands, who in 1981 had starved to death in Maze Prison after a hunger strike that lasted only 66 days.

Three years earlier, his lawyers had put forward a case arguing that abortion was illegal under Canada's 1960 Bill of Rights, in that it robbed fetuses of their right to life. The case was not brought to trial until 1983, and was not completed for several years after that. The Supreme Court of Canada refused to hear Borowski's case in 1989, on the grounds that it had become irrelevant when Canada's abortion laws were struck down in 1988.

Borowski also published a series of works in the late 1980s that were criticized as homophobic. In 1988, he released a document that called for "all known gays" to be quarantined from the rest of society until the AIDS epidemic had subsided. He also published a work entitled Child Molestation and Homosexuality, the front page of which showed a middle-aged man attempting to lure a child for sexual purposes. Winnipeg AIDS activist and future mayor Glen Murray became a vocal opponent of Borowski during this period.

Borowski died of cancer in 1996. In August 2004, author Lianne Laurence published a biography entitled Borowski: A Canadian Paradox, funded largely by donations from the anti-abortion community in Canada.

== Electoral record ==
1973 Manitoba general election: Point Douglas
Party	Candidate	Votes	%	±%
New Democratic	Donald Malinowski	3,676	65.55	
Independent	Joseph Borowski	1,127	20.10	
Liberal	Lawrence Belanger	569	10.15	
Independent	George Munroe	236	4.21	
Total valid votes		5,608	100.00	
Rejected and discarded votes		100		
Turnout		5,708	65.56	
Electors on the lists		8,706		

Manitoba provincial by-election, February 20, 1969: Churchill Resignation of Gordon Beard
Party	Candidate	Votes	%	±%	Expenditures
New Democratic	Joseph Borowski	2,637	32.67		$2,350.33
Independent	Blain Johnston	2,616	32.41		$3,733.76
Liberal	Garry Walsh	1,709	21.17	–	$6,242.87
Progressive Conservative	Michael Klewchuk	1,109	13.74		$7,346.47
Total valid votes		8,071	100		
Rejected and discarded votes		17			
Turnout		8,088	62.97		
Electors on the lists		12,845			
