= Tom Lindsey =

Canadian politician

The Honourable Tom Lindsey MLA

31st Speaker of the Legislative Assembly of Manitoba
- Incumbent
- Assumed office November 9, 2023
- Preceded by: Myrna Driedger

Member of the Legislative Assembly of Manitoba for Flin Flon
- Incumbent
- Assumed office April 19, 2016
- Preceded by: Clarence Pettersen

Personal details
- Born: Saskatchewan, Canada
- Party: New Democratic

Tom Lindsey is a Canadian politician who is currently serving as the 31st Speaker of the Legislative Assembly of Manitoba. He has represented the riding of Flin Flon in the Legislative Assembly of Manitoba since 2016. He is a member of the Manitoba New Democratic Party.

== Biography ==
Born in Southern Saskatchewan, Lindsey moved to Flin Flon in 1974. Lindsey has been a member of the New Democratic Party since the 1970s. Lindsey worked in the Flin Flon mill, eventually becoming its head operator, and was active in the United Steelworkers Local 7106. A member of the New Democratic Party of Manitoba, Lindsey defeated incumbent NDP MLA Clarence Pettersen for the party's nomination in the 2016 general election; he held the seat for the party while Pettersen ran as an independent candidate.

Lindsey was reelected in the 2019 election with an increased majority. In the Legislative Assembly, Lindsey served as the Official Opposition’s Critic for Labour, Resource Development and Northern Affairs.

Lindsey was acclaimed as Speaker of the Legislative Assembly of Manitoba on November 9, 2023, thirty-seven days after the 2023 Manitoba general election, wherein the NDP won government from the Progressive Conservatives.

In May 2025, Lindsey apologized for saying that a question by Greg Nesbitt suggesting that a mental health contract for workers who had searched a landfill for victims of the 2022 Winnipeg serial killings was for NDP Finance Minister Adrien Sala's personal use was out of order. Nesbitt subsequently apologized for the comments.

== Electoral history ==
2023 Manitoba general election: Flin Flon
Party	Candidate	Votes	%	±%	Expenditures
New Democratic	Tom Lindsey	2,951	76.25	+13.06	$26,700.07
Progressive Conservative	Charlotte Larocque	919	23.75	-3.28	$0.00
Total valid votes/expense limit		3,870	99.21	–	$64,119.00
Total rejected and declined ballots		31	0.79	–	
Turnout		3,901	44.17	+10.26	
Eligible voters		8,832			
New Democratic hold		Swing		+8.17	
Source(s) Source: Elections Manitoba

2019 Manitoba general election: Flin Flon
Party	Candidate	Votes	%	±%	Expenditures
New Democratic	Tom Lindsey	3,173	63.19	30.35	$23,174.56
Progressive Conservative	Theresa Wride	1,357	27.03	-1.31	$21,639.00
Liberal	James Lindsay	299	5.95	-22.20	$2,047.30
Green	Saara Murnick	192	3.82	–	$0.00
Total valid votes		5,021	99.41	–	
Rejected		30	0.59		
Turnout		5,051	33.91		
Eligible voters		14,896			
Source(s) Source: Manitoba. Chief Electoral Officer (2019). Statement of Votes for the 42nd Provincial General Election, September 10, 2019 (PDF) (Report). Winnipeg: Elections Manitoba.

2016 Manitoba general election: Flin Flon
Party	Candidate	Votes	%	±%	Expenditures
New Democratic	Tom Lindsey	1,106	32.85	-24.29	$43,604.96
Progressive Conservative	Angela Enright	954	28.33	4.24	$18,686.00
Liberal	Leslie Joan Beck	948	28.16	12.74	$19,946.62
Independent	Clarence Pettersen	359	10.66	–	$6,320.44
Total valid votes		3,367	–	–	
Rejected		36	–		
Eligible voters / turnout		9,880	34.44	-0.90	
Source(s) Source: Manitoba. Chief Electoral Officer (2016). Statement of Votes for the 41st Provincial General Election, April 19, 2016 (PDF) (Report). Winnipeg: Elections Manitoba."Candidates: 41st General Election". Elections Manitoba. 29 March 2016.
