= John Ingebrigtson =

Canadian politician

John Evinn Ingebrigtson (October 20, 1919 in Elvebakken, Norway – November 27, 1998) was a politician in Manitoba, Canada. He served in the Legislative Assembly of Manitoba as a Progressive Conservative Member of the Legislative Assembly from 1959 to 1962.

Ingebrigtson's family moved from Norway to Manitoba shortly after his birth, and settled in the northern community of The Pas. He later moved to the community of Churchill and worked as a shipper, hunter and trapper. After serving with the Royal Canadian Air Force in the Pacific during World War II, he returned to Ottawa, where he worked for the National Research Board. Ingebrigtson married Lorraine Helen Murtagh in 1942. Later, he returned to Churchill to start a family business.

Ingebrigtson was elected to the Manitoba legislature in the 1959 provincial election, defeating Liberal-Progressive candidate Kenneth Wray by 261 votes in the sprawling northern constituency of Churchill. Due to the logistical difficulties of conducting an election in the region, the vote was held on June 11, 1959, after the rest of the province had already voted.

Ingebrigtson served as a backbench supporter of Dufferin Roblin's government. He supported increased health and education services for the region, and did not seek re-election in 1962. After leaving the house, he worked in the tourism sector. A 1969 article in the Winnipeg Free Press indicated that he was still operating a business in Churchill.

His son, Mark Ingebrigtson, was later a candidate for the Progressive Conservatives.
