= 18th Manitoba Legislature =

The members of the 18th Manitoba Legislature were elected in the Manitoba general election held in June 1927. The legislature sat from December 1, 1927, to May 7, 1932.

The Progressive Party of Manitoba led by John Bracken formed the government.

Fawcett Taylor of the Conservatives was Leader of the Opposition.

The Minimum Wage Act, which previously only applied to female workers, was amended to include male workers under the age of 18. The minimum wage was $0.25 per hour.

Philippe Adjutor Talbot served as speaker for the assembly.

There were five sessions of the 18th Legislature:

Session	Start	End
1st	December 1, 1927	March 16, 1928
2nd	February 11, 1929	May 26, 1929
3rd	January 21, 1930	April 14, 1930
4th	January 27, 1931	April 20, 1931
5th	February 29, 1932	May 7, 1932

Theodore Arthur Burrows was Lieutenant Governor of Manitoba until January 18, 1929, when James Duncan McGregor became lieutenant governor.

== Members of the Assembly ==
The following members were elected to the assembly in 1927:

Member	Electoral district	Party	First elected / previously elected	No.# of term(s)	Notes
Duncan Lloyd McLeod	Arthur	Progressive	1922	2nd term	
Joseph Cotter	Assiniboia	Conservative	1927	1st term	
Adalbert Poole	Beautiful Plains	Progressive	1927	1st term	
John Pratt	Birtle	Progressive	1927	1st term	
John Pratt	Birtle	Independent	1927	1st term	
John Edmison	Brandon City	Independent	1920	3rd term	
Albert Préfontaine	Carillon	Progressive	1903, (Note: First elected as Conservative) 1915, (Note: Re-elected as Conservative) 1922	6th term*	
William H. Spinks	Cypress	Conservative	1920	3rd term	
Robert Ferguson	Dauphin	Conservative	1927	1st term	
Hugh McKenzie	Deloraine	Progressive	1927	1st term	
John Munn	Dufferin	Progressive	1927	1st term	
Robert Curran	Emerson	Progressive	1927	1st term	
Nicholas Hryhorczuk	Ethelbert	Progressive	1920	3rd term	
Stuart Garson	Fairford	Progressive	1927	1st term	
Nicholas Bachynsky	Fisher	Progressive	1922	2nd term	
Arthur Berry	Gilbert Plains	Progressive	1922	2nd term	
Ingimar Ingaldson	Gimli	Progressive	1927	1st term	
William Morton	Gladstone	Progressive	1927	1st term	
James Breakey	Glenwood	Liberal	1914, 1922	4th term*	
Thomas Wolstenholme	Hamiota	Progressive	1922	2nd term	
Arthur Boivin	Iberville	Progressive	1917	4th term	
James McLenaghen	Kildonan and St. Andrews	Conservative	1927	1st term	
John Laughlin	Killarney	Conservative	1927	1st term	
Douglas Lloyd Campbell	Lakeside	Progressive	1922	2nd term	
Tobias Norris	Lansdowne	Liberal	1896, 1907	9th term*	Resigned March 14, 1928.
Donald Gordon McKenzie (1928)	Lansdowne	Progressive	1928	1st term	
Philippe Talbot	La Verendrye	Progressive	1915 (Note: First elected as a Liberal)	4th term	
Joseph Lusignan	Manitou	Conservative	1927	1st term	
Earl Rutledge	Minnedosa	Conservative	1927	1st term	
Hugh McGavin	Morden and Rhineland	Conservative	1927	1st term	
William Clubb	Morris	Progressive	1920	3rd term	
Irving Cleghorn	Mountain	Liberal	1927	1st term	Died in office November 14, 1929
Ivan Schultz (1930)	Mountain	Liberal	1930	1st term	
John Muirhead	Norfolk	Progressive	1922	2nd term	
Fawcett Taylor	Portage la Prairie	Conservative	1920	3rd term	
Frederic Newton	Roblin	Conservative	1911, (Note: Russell) 1922	5th term*	
William McKinnell	Rockwood	Progressive	1920	3rd term	
Herbert Beresford	Rupertsland	Progressive	1927	1st term	
Isaac Griffiths	Russell	Progressive	1922	2nd term	
Joseph Bernier	St. Boniface	Conservative	1900, 1907, 1920	7th term*	
Robert Hoey	St. Clements	Progressive	1927	1st term	
Skuli Sigfusson	St. George	Liberal	1915, 1922	3rd term*	
Maurice Dane MacCarthy	Ste. Rose	Progressive	1927	1st term	
Murdoch Mackay	Springfield	Liberal	1927	1st term	
Andrew McCleary	Swan River	Progressive	1927	1st term	
John Bracken	The Pas	Progressive	1922	2nd term	
Richard Gardiner Willis	Turtle Mountain	Conservative	1922	2nd term	Died in office February 1929
Alexander Welch (1929)	Turtle Mountain	Conservative	1929	1st term	
Robert Mooney	Virden	Progressive	1922	2nd term	
William Major	Winnipeg	Progressive	1927	1st term	
Edward William Montgomery	Winnipeg	Progressive	1927	1st term	
John Thomas Haig	Winnipeg	Conservative	1914, (Note: Assiniboia) 1920	4th term*	
William Sanford Evans	Winnipeg	Conservative	1922	2nd term	
William Tobias	Winnipeg	Conservative	1927	1st term	
Hugh Robson	Winnipeg	Liberal	1927	1st term	
Edith Rogers	Winnipeg	Liberal	1920	3rd term	
John Queen	Winnipeg	Independent Labour	1920	3rd term	
Seymour Farmer	Winnipeg	Independent Labour	1922	2nd term	
William Ivens	Winnipeg	Independent Labour	1920	3rd term	

== By-elections ==
By-elections were held to replace members for various reasons:

Electoral district	Member elected	Affiliation	Election date	Reason
Lansdowne	Donald Gordon McKenzie	Progressive	November 10, 1928	T Norris resigned March 14, 1928.
Morris	William Clubb	Progressive	May 30, 1929	W Clubb appointed Minister of Public Works
Turtle Mountain	Alexander Welch	Conservative	June 22, 1929	R G Willis died February 1929
Mountain	Ivan Schultz	Conservative	January 29, 1930	I Cleghorn died November 14, 1929
