= 19th Manitoba Legislature =

The members of the 19th Manitoba Legislature were elected in the Manitoba general election held in June 1932. The legislature sat from February 14, 1933, to June 12, 1936.

A coalition between the Progressive Party of Manitoba led by John Bracken and the Liberal Party led by Murdoch Mackay formed the government. Bracken served as premier.

Fawcett Taylor of the Conservatives was Leader of the Opposition. After Taylor resigned in 1933, William Sanford Evans became party leader.

The Minimum Wage Act was amended to include male workers over the age of 18. The minimum hourly wage in Manitoba was $0.25 for urban workers and $0.21 for rural workers. Up until 1931, the minimum wage only applied to female workers.

Philippe Adjutor Talbot served as speaker for the assembly.

There were four sessions of the 19th Legislature:

| Session | Start | End |
|---|---|---|
| 1st | February 14, 1933 | May 4, 1933 |
| 2nd | February 8, 1934 | April 7, 1934 |
| 3rd | February 12, 1935 | April 6, 1935 |
| 4th | February 18, 1936 | April 7, 1936 |

James Duncan McGregor was Lieutenant Governor of Manitoba until December 1, 1934, when William Johnston Tupper became lieutenant governor.

== Members of the Assembly ==
The following members were elected to the assembly in 1932:

| Member | Electoral district | Party | First elected / previously elected | No.# of term(s) | Notes |
|---|---|---|---|---|---|
| Duncan Lloyd McLeod | Arthur | Liberal-Progressive | 1922 | 3rd term | Died in office May 10, 1935 |
| John R. Pitt (1935) | Arthur | Liberal-Progressive | 1935 | 1st term | |
| Ralph Webb | Assiniboia | Conservative | 1932 | 1st term | |
| Adalbert Poole | Beautiful Plains | Liberal-Progressive | 1927 | 2nd term | |
| John Pratt | Birtle | Liberal-Progressive | 1927 | 2nd term | |
| George Dinsdale | Brandon City | Conservative | 1932 | 1st term | |
| Albert Préfontaine | Carillon | Liberal-Progressive | 1903, (Note: First elected as Conservative) 1915, (Note: Re-elected as Conservative) 1922 | 7th term* | Died in office February 21, 1935 |
| Edmond Prefontaine (1935) | Carillon | Liberal-Progressive | 1935 | 1st term | |
| James Christie | Cypress | Liberal-Progressive | 1932 | 1st term | |
| Robert Hawkins | Dauphin | Liberal-Progressive | 1932 | 1st term | |
| Hugh McKenzie | Deloraine | Liberal-Progressive | 1927 | 2nd term | |
| John Munn | Dufferin | Liberal-Progressive | 1927 | 2nd term | |
| Robert Curran | Emerson | Liberal-Progressive | 1927 | 2nd term | |
| Nicholas Hryhorczuk | Ethelbert | Liberal-Progressive | 1920 | 4th term | |
| Stuart Garson | Fairford | Liberal-Progressive | 1927 | 2nd term | |
| Nicholas Bachynsky | Fisher | Liberal-Progressive | 1922 | 3rd term | |
| Arthur Berry | Gilbert Plains | Liberal-Progressive | 1922 | 3rd term | |
| Ingimar Ingaldson | Gimli | Liberal-Progressive | 1932 | 1st term | |
| William Morton | Gladstone | Liberal-Progressive | 1927 | 2nd term | |
| James Breakey | Glenwood | Liberal-Progressive | 1914, 1922 | 5th term* | |
| Thomas Wolstenholme | Hamiota | Liberal-Progressive | 1922 | 3rd term | |
| Arthur Boivin | Iberville | Independent Liberal-Progressive | 1917 | 5th term | |
| James McLenaghen | Kildonan and St. Andrews | Conservative | 1927 | 2nd term | |
| Andrew Foster | Killarney | Liberal-Progressive | 1922, (Note: First elected as a Progressive) 1932 | 2nd term* | |
| Douglas Lloyd Campbell | Lakeside | Liberal-Progressive | 1922 | 3rd term | |
| Donald Gordon McKenzie | Lansdowne | Liberal-Progressive | 1928 | 2nd term | |
| Philippe Talbot | La Verendrye | Liberal-Progressive | 1915 (Note: First elected as a Liberal) | 5th term | |
| Frank McIntosh | Manitou | Liberal-Progressive | 1932 | 1st term | |
| Earl Rutledge | Minnedosa | Conservative | 1927 | 2nd term | |
| Cornelius Wiebe | Morden and Rhineland | Liberal-Progressive | 1932 | 1st term | |
| William Clubb | Morris | Liberal-Progressive | 1920 | 4th term | |
| Ivan Schultz | Mountain | Liberal-Progressive | 1930 | 2nd term | |
| John Muirhead | Norfolk | Liberal-Progressive | 1922 | 3rd term | |
| Fawcett Taylor | Portage la Prairie | Conservative | 1920 | 4th term | Resigned April 1933 |
| Toby Sexsmith (1933) | Portage la Prairie | Conservative | 1933 | 1st term | |
| William James Westwood | Roblin | Independent Labour | 1917, 1932 | 2nd term* | |
| William McKinnell | Rockwood | Liberal-Progressive | 1920 | 4th term | |
| Ewan McPherson | Rupertsland | Liberal-Progressive | 1914, (Note: Portage la Prairie) 1932 | 3rd term* | |
| Isaac Griffiths | Russell | Liberal-Progressive | 1922 | 3rd term | |
| Harold Lawrence | St. Boniface | Independent Labour | 1932 | 1st term | |
| Robert Hoey | St. Clements | Liberal-Progressive | 1927 | 2nd term | |
| Skuli Sigfusson | St. George | Liberal-Progressive | 1915, 1922 | 4th term* | |
| Maurice Dane MacCarthy | Ste. Rose | Liberal-Progressive | 1927 | 2nd term | |
| Clifford Barclay | Springfield | Independent Farmer-Labour | 1922, 1932 | 2nd term* | |
| George Renouf | Swan River | Conservative | 1932 | 1st term | |
| John Bracken | The Pas | Liberal-Progressive | 1922 | 3rd term | |
| Alexander Welch | Turtle Mountain | Conservative | 1929 | 2nd term | |
| Robert Mooney | Virden | Liberal-Progressive | 1922 | 3rd term | |
| William Sanford Evans | Winnipeg | Conservative | 1922 | 3rd term | |
| Seymour Farmer | Winnipeg | Independent Labour | 1922 | 3rd term | |
| John Thomas Haig | Winnipeg | Conservative | 1914, (Note: Assiniboia) 1920 | 5th term* | |
| Marcus Hyman | Winnipeg | Independent Labour | 1932 | 1st term | |
| Huntly Ketchen | Winnipeg | Conservative | 1932 | 1st term | |
| William Major | Winnipeg | Liberal-Progressive | 1927 | 2nd term | |
| Ralph Maybank | Winnipeg | Liberal-Progressive | 1932 | 1st term | |
| John Stewart McDiarmid | Winnipeg | Liberal-Progressive | 1932 | 1st term | |
| William Ivens | Winnipeg | Independent Labour | 1920 | 4th term | |
| John Queen | Winnipeg | Independent Labour | 1920 | 4th term | |

== By-elections ==
By-elections were held to replace members for various reasons:

| Electoral district | Member elected | Affiliation | Election date | Reason |
|---|---|---|---|---|
| Portage la Prairie | Toby Sexsmith | Conservative | November 27, 1933 | F Taylor resigned |
| Arthur | John R. Pitt | Liberal-Progressive | June 24, 1935 | D McLeod died May 10, 1935 |
| Russell | Isaac Griffiths | Liberal-Progressive | July 4, 1935 | I Griffiths appointed Minister of Health And Public Welfare |
| Carillon | Edmond Prefontaine | Liberal-Progressive | July 4, 1935 | A Prefontaine died February 21, 1935 |
