= 17th Manitoba Legislature =

The members of the 17th Manitoba Legislature were elected in the Manitoba general election held in July 1922. The legislature sat from January 18, 1923, to June 4, 1927.

The United Farmers of Manitoba formed the government. John Bracken, who had not run in the election, was chosen as party leader. He was subsequently elected to the assembly in a deferred election held in The Pas. The United Farmers would later identify themselves as the Progressive Party.

Tobias Norris of the Liberals was Leader of the Opposition.

In a 1923 referendum, Manitoba voters approved the sale of beer and wine under the control of the government, ending prohibition in the province.

Philippe Adjutor Talbot served as speaker for the assembly.

There were six sessions of the 17th Legislature:

Session	Start	End
1st	January 18, 1923	May 5, 1923
2nd	July 25, 1923	July 27, 1923
3rd	January 10, 1924	April 5, 1924
4th	January 15, 1925	April 9, 1925
5th	January 21, 1926	April 23, 1926
6th	February 3, 1927	April 9, 1927

James Albert Manning Aikins was Lieutenant Governor of Manitoba until October 9, 1926, when Theodore Arthur Burrows became lieutenant governor.

== Members of the Assembly ==
The following members were elected to the assembly in 1922:

Member	Electoral district	Party	First elected / previously elected	No.# of term(s)	Notes
Duncan Lloyd McLeod	Arthur	United Farmers	1922	1st term	
William Bayley	Assiniboia	Independent Labour Party	1920	2nd term	
William Bayley	Assiniboia	Independent	1920	2nd term	
George Little	Beautiful Plains	United Farmers	1920	2nd term	
William J. Short	Birtle	United Farmers	1920	2nd term	
John Edmison	Brandon City	Independent	1920	2nd term	
Albert Préfontaine	Carillon	United Farmers	1903, (Note: First elected as Conservative) 1915, (Note: Re-elected as Conservative) 1922	5th term*	
William H. Spinks	Cypress	Conservative	1920	2nd term	
Archibald Esplen	Dauphin	Liberal	1922	1st term	
Duncan Stuart McLeod	Deloraine	United Farmers	1922	1st term	
William Brown	Dufferin	United Farmers	1922	1st term	
Dmytro Yakimischak	Emerson	Independent	1920 (Note: First elected as a Progressive)	2nd term	
Nicholas Hryhorczuk	Ethelbert (Note: Election held August 26, 1922)	United Farmers	1920	2nd term	
Albert Kirvan	Fairford	Liberal	1920	2nd term	
Nicholas Bachynsky	Fisher	United Farmers	1922	1st term	
Arthur Berry	Gilbert Plains	United Farmers	1922	1st term	
Michael Rojeski	Gimli	Liberal	1922	1st term	
Albert McGregor	Gladstone	United Farmers	1922	1st term	
James Breakey	Glenwood	Liberal	1914, 1922	3rd term*	
Thomas Wolstenholme	Hamiota	United Farmers	1922	1st term	
Arthur Boivin	Iberville	United Farmers	1917	3rd term	
Charles Albert Tanner	Kildonan and St. Andrews	Independent Labour Party	1920	2nd term	
Andrew Foster	Killarney	United Farmers	1922	1st term	
Douglas Lloyd Campbell	Lakeside	United Farmers	1922	1st term	
Tobias Norris	Lansdowne	Liberal	1896, 1907	8th term*	
Philippe Talbot	La Verendrye	United Farmers	1915 (Note: First elected as a Liberal)	3rd term	
George Compton	Manitou	United Farmers	1922	1st term	
Neil Cameron	Minnedosa	United Farmers	1922	1st term	
John Kennedy	Morden and Rhineland	Conservative	1920	2nd term	
William Clubb	Morris	United Farmers	1920	2nd term	
Charles Cannon	Mountain	United Farmers	1922	1st term	
John Muirhead	Norfolk	United Farmers	1922	1st term	
Fawcett Taylor	Portage la Prairie	Conservative	1920	2nd term	
Frederic Newton	Roblin	Conservative	1911, (Note: Russell) 1922	4th term*	
William McKinnell	Rockwood	United Farmers	1920	2nd term	
Francis Black	Rupertsland (Note: Election held September 13, 1922)	United Farmers	1922	1st term	
Isaac Griffiths	Russell	United Farmers	1922	1st term	
Joseph Bernier	St. Boniface	Independent	1900, 1907, 1920	6th term*	
Donald A. Ross	St. Clements	Independent	1907, (Note: Springfield (First elected as a Liberal)) 1922	5th term*	
Skuli Sigfusson	St. George	Liberal	1915, 1922	2nd term*	
Joseph Hamelin	Ste. Rose	Independent	1914	4th term	
Joseph Hamelin	Ste. Rose	Conservative	1914	4th term	
Clifford Barclay	Springfield	United Farmers	1922	1st term	
Robert Emmond	Swan River	United Farmers	1920	2nd term	
John Bracken	The Pas (Note: Election held October 5, 1922)	United Farmers	1922	1st term	
Richard Gardiner Willis	Turtle Mountain	Conservative	1922	1st term	
Robert Mooney	Virden	United Farmers	1922	1st term	
Fred Dixon	Winnipeg	Independent Labour Party	1914	4th term	
Robert Jacob	Winnipeg	Liberal	1918, 1922	2nd term*	
John K. Downes	Winnipeg	Independent	1922	1st term	
William Sanford Evans	Winnipeg	Conservative	1922	1st term	
John Thomas Haig	Winnipeg	Conservative	1914, (Note: Assiniboia) 1920	3rd term*	
John Queen	Winnipeg	Labour	1920	2nd term	
Seymour Farmer	Winnipeg	Independent Labour Party	1922	1st term	
William Ivens	Winnipeg	Independent Labour Party	1920	2nd term	
Edith Rogers	Winnipeg	Liberal	1920	2nd term	
Richard Craig	Winnipeg	United Farmers	1922	1st term	

== By-elections ==
By-elections were held to replace members for various reasons:

Electoral district	Member elected	Affiliation	Election date	Reason
Arthur	Duncan Lloyd McLeod	United Farmers	August 26, 1922	DL McLeod appointed Provincial Secretary
Minnedosa	Neil Cameron	United Farmers	August 26, 1922	N Cameron appointed Minister of Agriculture
Morris	William Clubb	United Farmers	August 26, 1922	W Clubb appointed Minister of Public Works
Mountain	Charles Cannon	United Farmers	December 24, 1923	C Cannon appointed Minister of Education
Carillon	Albert Préfontaine	United Farmers	December 24, 1923	A Préfontaine appointed Provincial Secretary
Lansdowne	Tobias Norris	Liberal	December 9, 1925	T Norris resigned to run for federal seat
