= 1932 Manitoba general election =

- June 16, 1932

55 seats of the Legislative Assembly of Manitoba 27 seats needed for a majority
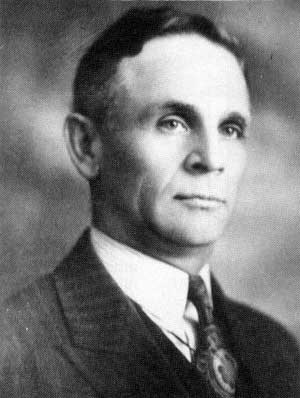
	First party	Second party	Third party
Leader	John Bracken	Fawcett Taylor	John Queen
Party	Liberal–Progressive	Conservative	Independent Labour
Leader since	August 8, 1922	April 5, 1922	1923
Leader's seat	The Pas	Portage la Prairie	Winnipeg
Last election	36	15	3
Seats won	38	10	5
Seat change	▲2	▼5	▲2
Popular vote	101,286	92,660	41,963
Percentage	39.6%	35.4%	16.5%
Swing	▼13.5pp	▲8.2pp	▲6.0pp
Premier before election
John Bracken
Liberal–Progressive
Premier after election
John Bracken
Liberal–Progressive

The 1932 Manitoba general election was held on June 16, 1932, to elect Members of the Legislative Assembly of the province of Manitoba, Canada. A Liberal-Progressive majority government was elected.

This was the second election in Manitoba where two types of preferential voting was used in all electoral divisions. Winnipeg elected ten members through single transferable ballot, while all other constituencies elected one member by instant runoff voting.

The election was called soon after the announcement of an alliance between the governing Progressive Party of John Bracken and the Liberal Party led by Murdoch Mackay. These parties were ideologically similar, and had a common interest in preventing the Conservative Party from coming to power. National Liberal leader William Lyon Mackenzie King supported this alliance, out of concern that a Conservative victory would strengthen the hand of Conservative Prime Minister Richard Bennett.

Bracken tried to bring the Conservatives into his coalition, but was rebuffed by Conservative leader Fawcett Taylor. Taylor's refusal to consider a consensus government was used against him in the campaign.

The election was also contested by the social democratic Independent Labour Party, under the leadership of John Queen. Though it was the second-largest party in the legislature after the 1920 election, Labour had slumped to only three seats in 1927 amid a general period of decline in the Canadian left. While the ILP was poised to improve its showing in the 1932 campaign, it was not a serious contender for government. In the event it elected only five MLAs, four in Winnipeg and one in St. Boniface, evidence of the benefits of preferential balloting to a minority party.

Some members of the provincial Liberal Party opposed the Liberal-Progressive alliance, and contested the election as "continuing Liberals". Their leader was David Campbell, the mayor of St. Boniface.

Leslie Morris and Jacob Penner of the Communist Party campaigned in the city of Winnipeg, and other Communist candidates ran in the outlying areas. As the Communist Party was under legal restrictions at the time, they ran as "United Front Workers" candidates. Former Member of the Legislative Assembly (MLA) George Armstrong ran as a candidate of the Socialist Party, and Jessie MacLennan campaigned as a labour candidate unaffiliated with the ILP.

The result was a resounding victory for the governing alliance, as Liberals, Progressives and their allies won 38 out of 55 seats. The Conservatives fell from fifteen seats to ten. Having lost his third consecutive election, Fawcett Taylor resigned as Conservative leader in 1933. The Independent Labour Party managed a modest recovery after its poor showing in 1927, increasing its caucus to five members. No other parties' candidates were elected, although two former Progressives were elected as independents. The Continuing Liberals fared especially poorly, and disappeared after the election.

Leslie Morris came 309 votes short of winning the tenth seat in Winnipeg. Had he won, he would have been the first Communist elected to a provincial legislature in Canada.

The new Legislature would see 15 new MLAs, ten arising from incumbents being defeated, and the other five from open seats. Of the latter, four incumbents chose not to run, and one incumbent (John H. Edmison of Brandon) had died in March 1932.

== Results ==
Manitoba general election (June 16, 1932)
Party	Leader	First-preference votes		Seats			
Party	Leader	Votes	% FPv	Cand.	1927	Elected	Change
Liberal–Progressive (Note: 1927 figure is combined total of Progressive and Liberal seats)	John Bracken	97,388	38.26	50	33	36	3▲
Conservative	Fawcett Taylor	90,135	35.41	48	15	10	5▼
Independent Labour	John Queen	35,992	14.14	15	3	5	2▲
Continuing Liberal	David Campbell	6,126	2.41	12	–	–	–
United Front Workers		5,635	2.21	4	–	–	–
Independent		3,897	1.53	7	1	–	1▼
Independent-Farmer-Labour		3,594	1.41	2	–	1	1▲
Independent-LP		3,530	1.39	3	–	2	2▲
Independent Ukrainian		2,693	1.06	1	–	–	–
Independent-Progressive		1,954	0.77	1	2	1	1▼
Labour		1,600	0.63	1	–	–	–
Independent-Farmer		997	0.39	1	1	–	1▼
Socialist		848	0.33	1	–	–	–
Independent-Conservative		173	0.07	1	–	–	–
Valid		254,562	100.00	147	55	55	–
Rejected		n/a					
Total votes cast		254,562					
Registered voters/Turnout		350,476	72.6				

=== First-preference votes by riding ===
Riding	LP	Con	ILP	CL	Ind	Ind-Con	Ind-Frm	Ind-FL	Ind-LP	Ind-Pr	Ind-Ukr	Lab	Soc	UFW	Total
Rural single-member ridings
Arthur	1,835	881													2,716
Assiniboia	1,008	2,813	2,349												6,170
Beautiful Plains	2,378	1,729													4,107
Birtle		1,315								1,954					3,269
Brandon City	1,423	2,647	1,574	893											6,537
Carillon	2,590	804													3,394
Cypress	1,795	1,539													3,334
Dauphin	1,668	1,525	578												3,771
Deloraine	2,003	1,523													3,526
Dufferin	2,568	1,966													4,534
Emerson	1,987	1,742						559							4,288
Ethelbert	2,331		1,682												4,013
Fairford	1,011			677											1,688
Fisher	845	352							195					364	1,756
Gilbert Plains	1,601	1,312													2,913
Gimli (Note: two LP candidates fielded, from both the Progressive and Liberal wings)	2,409	858		230										710	4,207
Gladstone	1,902	1,144													3,046
Glenwood	2,020	1,087													3,107
Hamiota	1,847	1,223													3,070
Iberville		807		304					1,488						2,599
Kildonan and St. Andrews	2,308	2,543	1,315												6,166
Killarney	1,571	1,481													3,052
Lakeside	1,969	1,522													3,491
Lansdowne	2,193	1,095		189	302										3,779
La Verendrye	1,587	1,473			374										3,434
Manitou	2,268	1,776													4,044
Minnedosa	2,210	2,336			396										4,942
Morden and Rhineland	2,837	2,390													5,227
Morris	2,526	1,077													3,603
Mountain	3,076	1,182													4,258
Norfolk	1,773	1,537													3,310
Portage la Prairie	1,051	2,016													3,067
Roblin		1,238							1,847						3,085
Rockwood	2,114	1,136					997								4,247
Rupertsland	527				111										638
Russell	2,523	1,237													3,760
St. Boniface	3,283	3,483	3,477	1,116											11,359
St. Clements	3,234	2,046	1,774	412											7,466
St. George	1,604	1,104													2,708
Ste. Rose	1,959	1,203													3,162
Springfield	2,407	1,080	235	232				3,035							6,989
Swan River	1,034	1,698			1,279										4,011
The Pas	1,915		1,072			173									3,160
Turtle Mountain	1,277	1,322													2,599
Virden	2,101	1,619		249											3,969
Winnipeg (multi-member riding)
Winnipeg	14,818	27,274	21,938	1,824	1,435						2,693	1,600	848	4,561	76,991
Provincewide
Total	97,386	90,135	35,994	6,126	3,897	173	997	3,594	3,530	1,954	2,693	1,600	848	5,635	254,562

=== Results by riding ===
Incumbents are marked with *.

For Liberal and Progressive incumbents:

( ) = Progressive MLA in previous Legislature
( ) = Liberal MLA in previous Legislature

( ) Arthur: Duncan Lloyd McLeod*
Assiniboia: Ralph Webb
( ) Beautiful Plains: Adalbert Poole*
( ) Birtle: John Pratt* (Ind-Prog)
Brandon: George Dinsdale
( ) Carillon: Albert Prefontaine*
Cypress: James Christie
Dauphin: Robert Hawkins
( ) Deloraine: Hugh McKenzie*
( ) Dufferin: John Munn*
( ) Emerson: Robert Curran*
( ) Ethelbert: Nicholas Hryhorczuk*
( ) Fairford: Stuart Garson*
( ) Fisher: Nicholas Bachynsky*
( ) Gilbert Plains: Arthur Berry*
Gimli: Einar Jonasson
( ) Gladstone: William Morton*
( ) Glenwood: James Breakey*
( ) Hamiota: Thomas Wolstenholme*
( ) Iberville: Arthur R. Boivin* (Ind-LP)
Kildonan & St. Andrews: James McLenaghen*
Killarney: Andrew Foster
( ) Lakeside: Douglas Campbell*
( ) Lansdowne: Donald McKenzie*
( ) La Verendrye: Philippe Adjutor Talbot*
Manitou: Frank McIntosh
Minnedosa: Earl Rutledge*
Morden & Rhineland: C.W. Wiebe
( ) Morris: William Clubb*
( ) Mountain: Ivan Schultz*
( ) Norfolk: John Muirhead*
Portage la Prairie: Fawcett Taylor*
Roblin: William Westwood (Ind-LP)
( ) Rockwood: William McKinnell*
Rupertsland: Ewan McPherson
( ) Russell: Isaac Griffiths*
St. Boniface: Harold Lawrence
( ) St. Clements: Robert Hoey*
( ) St. George: Skuli Sigfusson*
( ) Ste. Rose: Maurice Dane MacCarthy*
Springfield: Clifford Barclay (Ind-Frm-Lab)
Swan River: George Renouf*
( ) The Pas: John Bracken*
Turtle Mountain: Alexander Welch*
( ) Virden: Robert Mooney*
Winnipeg: John Stewart McDiarmid
( ) Winnipeg: William Major*
Winnipeg: Ralph Maybank
Winnipeg: William Sanford Evans*
Winnipeg: John Thomas Haig*
Winnipeg: Huntly Ketchen
Winnipeg: Seymour Farmer*
Winnipeg: Marcus Hyman
Winnipeg: William Ivens*
Winnipeg: John Queen*

=== Seats changing hands ===
In the single-member ridings, 13 seats changed allegiance:

Conservative to Liberal-Progressive

- Cypress
- Dauphin
- Killarney
- Manitou
- Morden & Rhineland

Conservative to ILP

- St. Boniface

Conservative to Independent-LP

- Roblin

Liberal-Progressive to Conservative

- Swan River

Liberal-Progressive to Independent-Progressive

- Birtle

Liberal-Progressive to Independent-Farmer-Labour

- Springfield

Independent to Conservative

- Brandon

Independent-Farmer to Liberal-Progressive

- Ethelbert

Independent-Progressive to Independent-LP

- Iberville

(Italics indicate that incumbent changed allegiance)

In Winnipeg, the seat distribution was changed as follows:

Winnipeg - distribution of seats (1927 vs 1922)
Party	1927	1932	change
Liberal–Progressive	4	3	1▼
Conservative	3	3	Steady
ILP	3	4	1▲
Total	10	10	

=== Turnover on runoff ===
In the single-member ridings, there was only one case where the first-place candidate on first-preference votes failed to win:

St. Boniface - Summary of results (1932)
Party	Candidate	First-preference votes		Maximum votes		
Party	Candidate	Votes	% FPv	Votes	Round	Initial vs transfer votes mix
Conservative	Joseph Bernier*	3,483	30.66	4,470	3	
Independent Labour	Harold Lawrence	3,477	30.61	4,954	3	
Liberal–Progressive	L.P. Gagnon	3,283	28.90	3,560	2	
Continuing Liberal	David Campbell	1,116	9.83	1,116	1	
Total		11,359	100.00			
Exhausted votes				1,935	17.03%	

In the second count, Lawrence received enough transfers from Campbell to lead by 82 votes. He would receive a significant share from Gagnon's transfers to finish with a lead of 484 votes. Lawrence would become the first-ever ILP MLA for the riding.

=== Multiple-LP candidate contests ===
In two ridings, two LP candidates—respectively nominated by the party's Liberal and Progressive wings—were on the ballot.

Gimli - Summary of results (1932)
Party	Candidate	First-preference votes		Maximum votes		
Party	Candidate	Votes	% FPv	Votes	Round	Initial vs transfer votes mix
Liberal–Progressive (Lib)	Einar Jonasson	1,340	31.81	1,704	4	
Liberal–Progressive (Prog)	Ingimar Ingaldson*	1,069	25.37	1,410	4	
Conservative	Gunnar Thorvaldson	858	20.37	858	3	
United Front Workers	Iwan Kapusta	710	16.85	716	2	
Continuing Liberal	Michael Ewanchuk	236	5.60	236	1	
Total		4,213	100.00			
Exhausted votes				1,099	26.09%	

Rupertsland - Summary of results (1932)
Party	Candidate	First-preference votes		Maximum votes		
Party	Candidate	Votes	% FPv	Votes	Round	Initial vs transfer votes mix
Liberal–Progressive (Lib)	Ewan McPherson	312	48.90	319	2	
Liberal–Progressive (Prog)	Herbert G. Beresford*	215	33.70	229	2	
Independent	Capt. Evans Atkinson	111	17.40	111	1	
Total		638	100.00			
Exhausted votes				90	14.11%	

McPherson had previously failed to unseat Fawcett Taylor in Portage la Prairie on Election Day, so he opted to campaign again in Rupertsland, which had been deferred to July 14. This time he was successful.

=== Winnipeg ===
Winnipeg (ten members):

Valid votes: 76,991 Quota: 7000 votes

Winnipeg MLAs returned by party
Party	MLAs
Liberal–Progressive	3
Conservative	3
ILP	4
Total	10

Winnipeg - Summary of results (1932)
Party	Candidate	First-preference votes		Maximum votes		
Party	Candidate	Votes	% FPv	Votes	Round	Initial vs transfer votes mix
Conservative	William Sanford Evans*	13,507	17.54	13,507	1	
Independent Labour	John Queen*	9,302	12.08	9,302	1	
Liberal–Progressive	William Major*	5,940	7.72	7,044	17	
Independent Labour	Seymour Farmer*	5,053	6.56	7,105	11	
Conservative	John Thomas Haig*	4,432	5.76	7,019	5	
Liberal–Progressive	John Stewart McDiarmid	3,540	4.60	6,060	24	
Conservative	Huntly Ketchen	3,530	4.59	7,486	22	
United Front Workers	Leslie Morris	3,455	4.49	4,959	24	
Independent Labour	Marcus Hyman	3,366	4.37	6,593	24	
Liberal–Progressive	Ralph Maybank	2,945	3.83	5,268	24	
Independent Ukrainian	C. Andrusyshen	2,693	3.50	2,923	20	
Independent Labour	William Ivens*	2,262	2.94	5,470	24	
Conservative	William V. Tobias*	1,991	2.59	2,045	19	
Conservative	R.W.B. Swail	1,951	2.53	3,547	21	
Liberal–Progressive	Edward William Montgomery*	1,614	2.10	2,177	18	
Labour	Jessie MacLennan	1,600	2.08	2,082	16	
Conservative	James Alexander Barry	1,549	2.01	4,780	23	
Independent	F.W. Russell	1,339	1.74	1,570	15	
United Front Workers	Jacob Penner	1,106	1.44	1,106	13	
Independent Labour	V.B. Anderson	1,061	1.38	1,061	14	
Independent Labour	Beatrice Brigden	894	1.16	1,084	10	
Socialist	George Armstrong	848	1.10	880	9	
Continuing Liberal	H.P.A. Hermanson	688	0.89	1,331	13	
Liberal–Progressive	Duncan Cameron	597	0.78	597	7	
Continuing Liberal	John Y. Reid	588	0.76	812	8	
Continuing Liberal	Clarence G. Keith	548	0.71	588	6	
Conservative	D.M. Elcheshen	314	0.41	378	4	
Liberal–Progressive	W.J. Fulton	182	0.24	182	3	
Independent	Thomas Gargan	96	0.12	96	3	
Total		76,991	100.00			
Exhausted votes				11,600	15.07%	

== Sources ==
The first ballot results for Winnipeg and results for all other constituencies are taken from an official Manitoba government publication entitled "Manitoba elections, 1920-1941", cross-referenced with an appendix to the government's report of the 2003 provincial election. The Canadian parliamentary guide lists slightly different results from Kildonan & St. Andrews, Lansdowne, La Verendrye, Morris, Springfield and Turtle Mountain; the other two sources are more comprehensive, however, and may be taken as more reliable.

All ballot results for Winnipeg after the first count are taken from reports in the Winnipeg Free Press newspaper. It is possible that some errors appeared in the original publication.

== Post-election changes ==
Portage la Prairie (res. Fawcett Taylor, 1933), November 27, 1933:

- Toby Sexsmith (C) 1166, 1261
- E.A. Gilroy (Ind [LP]) 851, 1024
- H.A. Ireland (Ind-Lab) 597

Arthur (dec. Duncan McLeod, May 10, 1935), June 24, 1935:

- John R. Pitt (LP) accl.

Russell (Isaac Griffiths to cabinet, May 28, 1935), July 4, 1935:

- Isaac Griffiths (LP) accl.

Carillon (dec. Albert Prefontaine, 1935), July 4, 1935:

- Edmond Prefontaine (LP) 1948
- Louis-P. Gagnon 1793

Gimli (res. Einar Jonasson, 1935)

Winnipeg (res. Ralph Maybank, October 1, 1935)

Winnipeg (res. John Thomas Haig, 1935)
