= 1927 Manitoba general election =

- June 28, 1927

55 seats of the Legislative Assembly of Manitoba 27 seats needed for a majority
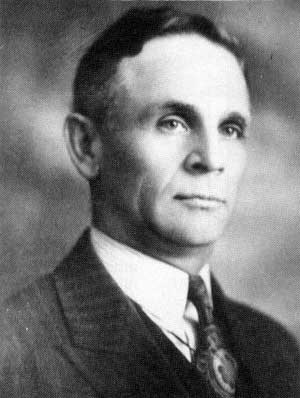

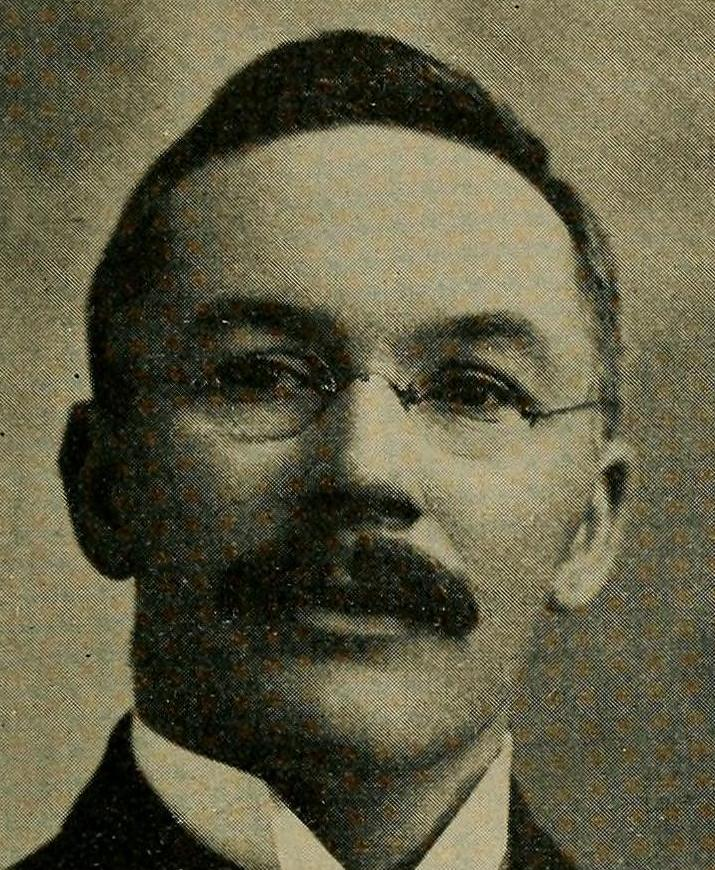
	First party	Second party
Leader	John Bracken	Fawcett Taylor
Party	Progressive	Conservative
Leader since	August 8, 1922	April, 1922
Leader's seat	The Pas	Portage la Prairie
Last election	28	7
Seats won	29	15
Seat change	▲1	▲8
Popular vote	52,805	44,320
Percentage	32.4%	27.2%
Swing	▼0.4pp	▲11.7pp
	Third party	Fourth party
Leader	Hugh Robson	John Queen
Party	Liberal	Independent Labour
Leader since	1927	1923
Leader's seat	Winnipeg	Winnipeg
Last election	8	6
Seats won	7	3
Seat change	▼1	▼3
Popular vote	33,852	17,133
Percentage	20.7%	10.5%
Swing	▼2.5pp	▼0.6pp
Premier before election
John Bracken
Progressive
Premier after election
John Bracken
Progressive

The 1927 Manitoba general election was held on 28 June 1927 to elect Members of the Legislative Assembly of the province of Manitoba, Canada. The result was a second consecutive victory for Manitoba farmers, following its 1922 win.

This was the first election in Manitoba history to elect MLAs through casting of ranked ballots in all districts. Ten MLAs were elected in Winnipeg through Single transferable vote, as they had done since 1920. The other districts now began to elect MLAs through Instant-runoff voting.

The Progressive Party of Manitoba, led by Premier John Bracken, won a second consecutive majority government in 1927. Progressive candidates won twenty-nine seats out of fifty-five to win their second majority government. During the campaign, the Progressives stressed that they were not a party in the traditional sense and promised "A business (not a party) government". Many Progressive candidates simply described themselves as Bracken supporters. The Progressive Party was supported by the powerful United Farmers of Manitoba organization.

The Conservatives won fifteen seats under the leadership of Fawcett Taylor, an improvement from seven in the election of 1922. This election re-established the Conservatives as the leading opposition party in Manitoba, and made the party a credible challenger for government in the next election.

The Manitoba Liberal Party was unable to regain the support it had lost to the Progressive Party in the previous election. The Liberals won seven seats under the new leadership of Hugh Robson, down one from their 1922 total. After the election, many senior Liberals began to work for an electoral alliance with the Progressives. Robson, who opposed this plan, was persuaded to resign as leader in 1930. The alliance was formalized in 1932.

The Independent Labour Party fell to three seats, down from six in the previous election. All three members, including party leader John Queen, were elected in the city of Winnipeg. Candidates of four separate parties - Liberal, Conservative, ILP and Progressive - plus an independent - were elected to fill that city's ten seats. Winnipeg seats were filled using a form of proportional representation, Single transferable voting.

Jacob Penner ran in Winnipeg as a Communist candidate, but was not successful. He lasted 19 rounds of transfers but picked up very few votes so was eliminated.

Independent candidate John Edmison was re-elected in Brandon.

The proportion of the vote received by the Progressive Party (based on first-preference votes) was enough to assure a functioning government, but it was one of lowest in Canadian history.

The Legislature experienced a significant turnover of members, with 23 seats electing new MLAs. Twelve incumbents (one in Winnipeg, and 11 more in other ridings) went down in defeat, six failed to be renominated, and five chose not to stand for reelection.

Under the instant-runoff voting used to elect 45 MLAs, the leader in the first count of the district's votes was the one elected in all but three districts, so the final results in the districts outside Winnipeg were almost the same as under First-past-the-post voting .

Of the 45 single-member ridings, two MLAs were returned by acclamation. Twenty-one were decided solely on first-preference votes, with no vote transfers conducted. The remainder (22) went to runoff counts. There were only three "turn-overs" where the first count leader did not win due to vote transfers - in Minnedosa, Morden & Rhineland and Springfield. The Progressive candidate was leading on the first count in all three districts but after vote transfers, Conservatives won two of them and Liberals won one.

Seventeen seats in the single-member districts went to parties different from the previous election. Eleven rural incumbents running for re-election under their old party label were defeated. Three other incumbents changed their party label and were re-elected. Three open seats flipped to another party.

== Results ==
Manitoba general election (June 29, 1927)
Party	Leader	First-preference votes		Seats			
Party	Leader	Votes	% FPv	Cand.	1922	Elected	Change
Progressive (Note: includes Robert Curran, who campaigned as a Liberal-Progressive)	John Bracken	52,423	32.12	44	28	26	2▼
Conservative	Fawcett Taylor	44,320	27.15	40	7	15	8▲
Liberal	Hugh Robson	33,852	20.74	40	8	7	1▼
Independent Labour (Note: after consolidation in the labour movement)	John Queen	15,987	9.80	10	6	3	3▼
Independent		8,495	5.20	12	4	1	3▼
Independent-Moderationist		3,200	1.96	2	1	–	1▼
Communist		2,015	1.23	1	–	–	–
Independent-Progressive		1,618	0.99	3	–	2	2▲
Independent-Farmer		1,302	0.80	1	1	1	Steady
Valid		163,212	100.00	153	55	55	–
Rejected		n/a					
Total votes cast		163,212					
Registered voters/Turnout (Note: number is for contested ridings only)		233,453	69.9				

Popular vote
Progressive	32.12%
Conservative	27.15%
Liberal	20.74%
Independent Labour	9.80%
Others	10.18%

Seats summary
Progressive	50.91%
Conservative	27.27%
Liberal	12.73%
Independent Labour	5.45%
Others	3.64%

=== Results by riding ===
Bold names indicate members returned by acclamation. Incumbents are marked with *.

Arthur: Duncan Lloyd McLeod*
Assiniboia: Joseph Cotter
Beautiful Plains: Adalbert Poole
Birtle: John Pratt
Brandon: John H. Edmison
Carillon: Albert Prefontaine*
Cypress: William H. Spinks*
Dauphin: Robert Ferguson
Deloraine: Hugh McKenzie
Dufferin: John Munn
Emerson: Robert Curran (Lib-Prog)
Ethelbert: Nicholas Hryhorczuk* (Ind-Frm)
Fairford: Stuart Garson
Fisher: Nicholas Bachynsky*
Gilbert Plains: Arthur Berry*
Gimli: Ingimar Ingaldson
Gladstone: William Morton
Glenwood: James Breakey*
Hamiota: Thomas Wolstenholme*
Iberville: **Arthur R. Boivin*** (Ind-Prog)
Kildonan & St. Andrews: James McLenaghen
Killarney: John Laughlin
Lakeside: Douglas Campbell*
Lansdowne: Tobias Norris*
La Verendrye: Philippe Adjutor Talbot*
Manitou: Joseph Lusignan
Minnedosa: George Compton
Morden & Rhineland: Hugh McGavin
Morris: William Clubb*
Mountain: Irving Cleghorn
Norfolk: John Muirhead*
Portage la Prairie: Fawcett Taylor*
Roblin: Frederic Newton*
Rockwood: William McKinnell*
Rupertsland: Herbert Beresford (Ind-Prog)
Russell: Isaac Griffiths*
St. Boniface: Joseph Bernier
St. Clements: Robert Hoey
St. George: Skuli Sigfusson*
Ste. Rose: Maurice Dane MacCarthy*
Springfield: Murdoch Mackay
Swan River: Andrew McCleary
The Pas: John Bracken*
Turtle Mountain: Richard G. Willis*
Virden: **Robert Mooney***
Winnipeg: William Major
Winnipeg: Edward Montgomery
Winnipeg: William Sanford Evans*
Winnipeg: John Thomas Haig*
Winnipeg: William Tobias
Winnipeg: Hugh Robson
Winnipeg: Edith Rogers*
Winnipeg: Seymour Farmer*
Winnipeg: William Ivens*
Winnipeg: John Queen*

=== Seats changing hands ===
In the single-member ridings, 17 seats changed allegiance:

**Progressive to Conservative**

- Killarney
- Manitou
- Minnedosa

**Progressive to Liberal**

- Mountain
- Springfield

**Progressive to Independent-Farmer**

- Ethelbert

**Progressive to Independent-Progressive**

- Iberville
- Rupertsland

**Liberal to Progressive**

- Fairford
- Gimli

**Liberal to Conservative**

- Dauphin

**ILP to Conservative**

- Assiniboia
- Kildonan & St. Andrews

**Independent to Progressive**

- St. Clements
- Ste. Rose

**Independent to Conservative**

- St. Boniface

**Independent-Farmer to Progressive**

- Emerson

(Italics indicate that incumbent changed allegiance)

In Winnipeg, the seat distribution was changed as follows:

Winnipeg - distribution of seats (1927 vs 1922)
Party	1922	1927	change
Progressive	1	2	1▲
Conservative	2	3	1▲
Liberal	2	2	Steady
ILP	4	3	1▼
Independent-Moderationist	1	–	1▼
**Total**	10	10	

=== Turnovers on runoff ===
In the single-member ridings, there were three cases where the first-place candidate on first-preference votes failed to win:

Minnedosa - Summary of results (1927)
Party	Candidate	First-preference votes		Maximum votes		
Party	Candidate	Votes	% FPv	Votes	Round	Initial vs transfer votes mix
Progressive	Norman W.P. Shuttleworth	1,405	41.89	1,581	2	
Conservative	**George Compton**	1,377	41.06	**1,595**	2	
Liberal	Walter Cooper Richardson	572	17.05	572	1	
**Total**		3,354	100.00			
**Exhausted votes**				178	5.31%	

Morden & Rhineland - Summary of results (1927)
Party	Candidate	First-preference votes		Maximum votes		
Party	Candidate	Votes	% FPv	Votes	Round	Initial vs transfer votes mix
Progressive	John Henry Black	1,075	41.20	1,132	2	
Conservative	**Hugh McGavin**	1,016	38.94	**1,252**	2	
Liberal	Peter Buerckert	518	19.85	518	1	
**Total**		2,609	100.00			
**Exhausted votes**				225	8.62%	

Springfield - Summary of results (1927)
Party	Candidate	First-preference votes		Maximum votes		
Party	Candidate	Votes	% FPv	Votes	Round	Initial vs transfer votes mix
Progressive	Clifford Barclay	1,459	43.70	1,489	2	
Liberal	**Murdoch Mackay**	1,389	41.60	**1,507**	2	
Conservative	Theo Stefanik	491	14.70	491	1	
**Total**		3,339	100.00			
**Exhausted votes**				343	10.27%	

=== First-preference votes by riding ===
= won on first-preference votes, by receiving majority of valid votes in the first count.

The candidate in the winning position in the first count won in the end in every district, except in the Minnedosa, Morden and Springfield districts, where the winner is indicated by his or her first count vote tally being in bold. (Note: that vote count was not the winner's final vote count.)

Riding	Prog	Con	Lib	ILP	Ind	Ind-Frm	Ind-Mod	Ind-Prog	Comm	Total
Rural single-member ridings
Arthur	1,226	902								2,128
Assiniboia	471	1,380	520	1,320				566		4,257
Beautiful Plains	1,360	965	511							2,836
Birtle	1,134	635	742							2,511
Brandon City	489			1,288	3,526					5,303
Carillon	1,604		458							2,062
Cypress	1,091	1,235	311							2,637
Dauphin	920	1,022	647							2,589
Deloraine	1,174	1,014	369							2,557
Dufferin	1,790	1,047	307							3,144
Emerson (Note: multiple Independent candidates)	795	313	652		814					2,574
Ethelbert					917	1,302				2,219
Fairford	437	296	358							1,091
Fisher	754	310	179		12					1,255
Gilbert Plains	1,021	592	315							1,928
Gimli	1,026	198	801		846					2,871
Gladstone	1,311				624					1,935
Glenwood	721	544	1,072							2,337
Hamiota	1,086	520	462							2,068
Iberville	**Acclaimed**									
Kildonan and St. Andrews	1,134	1,387	1,159							3,680
Killarney	934	1,189								2,123
Lakeside	1,442	1,274								2,716
Lansdowne		550	1,947							2,497
La Verendrye	1,074	440	581							2,095
Manitou	1,097	1,330	541							2,968
Minnedosa	1,405	**1,377**	572							3,354
Morden and Rhineland	1,075	**1,016**	518							2,609
Morris	1,663		285							1,948
Mountain	1,494		1,578							3,072
Norfolk	1,341	1,307								2,648
Portage la Prairie		1,580	795							2,375
Roblin	734	1,057	270							2,061
Rockwood	1,486	719	474		66					2,745
Rupertsland		81	145					216		442
Russell	1,227	936	903		254					3,320
St. Boniface	1,188	1,990	1,790	1,469						6,437
St. Clements	2,146			440	1,436					4,022
St. George	524	466	814							1,804
Ste. Rose	1,055	831	358							2,244
Springfield	1,459	491	**1,389**							3,339
Swan River	1,213	797	546							2,556
The Pas	582		454							1,036
Turtle Mountain	946	1,167								2,113
Virden	**Acclaimed**									
Winnipeg (multi-member riding)
Winnipeg	8,794	13,362	11,029	11,470			3,200	836	2,015	50,706
Provincewide
**Total**	52,423	44,320	33,852	15,987	8,495	1,302	3,200	1,618	2,015	163,212

=== Winnipeg ===
Eligible voters 67,124 Valid votes 50,706 Turnout: 76%

10 seats. Quota: 4,610

Elected: 2 Progressive Party, 3 Conservatives, 2 Liberals, 3 ILP (listed in same order as in above table)

Rogers and Ivens passed quota in Round 21. Their surpluses were not transferred as they could not possibly have bridged the gap between the least-popular remaining candidate and the other two remaining contenders. With their election, there were only three remaining candidates and two remaining open seats. Downes was then declared defeated - his votes were not transferred as Tobias and Montgomery were the only ones still standing and there were two seats left to be filled Tobias and Montgomery were elected with partial quota, as the field of candidates had been thinned to the number of remaining open seats.

Winnipeg - Summary of results (1927)
Label	Candidate	First-preference votes		Maximum votes		
Label	Candidate	Votes	% FPv	Votes	Round	Initial vs transfer votes mix
Conservative	**John Thomas Haig***	5,108	10.07	**5,108**	1	
Liberal	**Hugh Robson**	4,862	9.59	**4,862**	1	
Conservative	**William Sanford Evans***	4,551	8.98	**4,800**	3	
Independent Labour Party	**John Queen***	3,985	7.86	**4,631**	9	
Progressive Party	**William Major**	3,713	7.32	**5,142**	14	
Independent Labour Party	**Seymour Farmer***	3,497	6.90	**5,376**	13	
Progressive Party	**Edward Montgomery**	2,236	4.41	**3,960**	22	
Independent-Moderationist	John K. Downes*	2,047	4.04	3,411	21	
Communist Party	Jacob Penner	2,015	3.97	2,229	19	
Conservative	**William Tobias**	1,687	3.33	**4,114**	22	
Progressive Party	Royal Burritt	1,604	3.16	1,791	16	
Liberal	**Edith Rogers***	1,582	3.12	**4,764**	21	
Independent Labour Party	**William Ivens***	1,435	2.83	**4,700**	21	
Liberal	W.J. Lindal	1,362	2.69	1,669	13	
Liberal	Duncan Cameron	1,271	2.51	2,173	18	
Progressive Party	Max Steinkopf	1,241	2.45	1,291	10	
Liberal	Ralph Maybank	1,191	2.35	1,410	11	
Independent-Moderationist	Arthur Moore	1,153	2.27	1,218	9	
Conservative	Theodore A. Hunt	1,075	2.12	2,408	20	
Independent Labour Party	Sam Cartwright	999	1.97	1,049	7	
Independent Labour Party	R. Durward	993	1.96	1,691	14	
Conservative	R.A. Gillespie	941	1.86	1,116	8	
Independent-Progressive Party	F. Sedziak	836	1.65	842	6	
Liberal	J. MacLean	761	1.50	792	5	
Independent Labour Party	W.A. James	561	1.11	562	4	
**Total**		50,706	100.00			
**Exhausted votes**				5,508	10.86%	

Transfers of surplus votes belonging to elected Conservatives Haig and Evans went in large numbers to Tobias, helping him take a seat although he was not in top ten in the first count. Communist candidate Penner's vote tally was not large enough for him to win a seat and he received few vote transfers, but many of his votes were transferred to help elect Ivens, the last ILP member to be elected. The Independent-Moderationist candidate Downes received some vote transfers from supporters of candidates running under other labels, but not enough to maintain a lead over party candidates (Rogers and Ivens) who although initially lower ranking compared to Downes, received many vote transfers from elected or eliminated candidates of the same party. In each party the most popular candidates maintained their position visa vis other candidates of the same party all the way through. The question was how many quota each party had at the start (taking all the party candidates together) and how many they would pick up from cross-party transfers - this set up how many seats each party would take. The seats were filled by the candidates in popularity order set by the voters. Party lists, if they had been used as in Party-list proportional representation, might have dictated that different persons would have filled the seats that were indirectly allocated to each party than were the choice of voters in this election.

== Sources ==
The first ballot results for Winnipeg and results for all other constituencies are taken from an official Manitoba government publication entitled "Manitoba elections, 1920–1941", cross-referenced with the 1928 Canadian Parliamentary Guide, and an appendix to the Manitoba government's report of the 2003 provincial election.

All ballot results for Winnipeg after the first count are taken from reports in the Winnipeg Free Press newspaper. It is possible that some errors appeared in the original publication.

== Post-election changes ==
Birtle (John Pratt leaves the government side, early in the parliament).

Lansdowne (res. Tobias Norris, 1928), 10 November 1928:

- Donald McKenzie (Liberal/Progressive) 1527
- Harvey Hicks (C) 1260

Morris (William Clubb to new cabinet post, 18 May 1929), 30 May 1929:

- William Clubb (P) accl.

Turtle Mountain (dec. Richard G. Willis, February 1929), 22 June 1929:

- Alexander Welch (C) 1327
- W.E. Campbell (P) 995

Winnipeg (res. Hugh Robson, January 1930)

Mountain (dec. Irving Cleghorn, 1930), 20 January 1930:

- Ivan Schultz (L [endorsed by Progressives]) accl.

The Liberals formed an alliance with the governing Progressives in 1932.

Brandon City (dec. John H. Edmison, 22 March 1932)
