= Reuben Waugh =

Canadian politician

Reuben James Waugh (January 30, 1875 – October 14, 1945) was a politician in Manitoba, Canada. He served in the Legislative Assembly of Manitoba from 1920 to 1922 as a member of the Conservative Party. Waugh resided in Carberry, Manitoba during his time in the legislature.

He was born in Wiarton, Ontario, the son of Joseph Waugh, and was educated there and at Trinity Medical College. Before graduating, he taught school at Cape Croker. He practised in Bruce Mines and Lion's Head before moving to Carberry, Manitoba in 1903. He served as a coroner for the province and as chairman of the local school board. Waugh married Katherine Potts.

He was elected to the Manitoba legislature in the 1920 provincial election, defeating incumbent Liberal John Graham by 217 votes in the Norfolk constituency. The Liberals won a minority government in this election, and Waugh sat with his party on the opposition benches. He was defeated in the 1922 election, losing to John Muirhead of the United Farmers of Manitoba by 135 votes.

Waugh attempted to return to the legislature in the 1927 election, but lost to Muirhead by only 34 votes. He challenged Muirhead again in the 1932 election, and this time lost by 236 votes.

He served as mayor of Carberry from 1938 to 1945. Waugh died in Carberry in 1945.

R J Waugh Elementary School was named in his honour.
