= Manitoba Health =

Manitoba Health, Seniors and Long-Term Care
Agency overview
- Preceding agency: Manitoba Health and Seniors Care, Manitoba Health
- Headquarters: 300 Carlton Street, Winnipeg, MB R3B 3M9
- Annual budget: $6,778,233K CAD (2023)
- Minister responsible: Uzoma Asagwara, Minister of Health, Seniors and Long-Term Care
- Deputy Minister responsible: Karen Herd (as of 2013)
- Website: www.gov.mb.ca/health/

Manitoba Health, Seniors and Long–Term Care (formerly Health, and Seniors Care, MHSC; also known as Manitoba Health) is the department of the Government of Manitoba that is responsible for leading the development of policy and publicly administered health system planning in the province of Manitoba; the overall funding, performance requirements, oversight, and accountability within the system; promoting prevention and positive health practices; and administering other non-devolved health services in the province.

The department operates under the Minister of Health, who has been Uzoma Asagwara as of October 2023. The Chief Provincial Public Health Officer, Brent Roussin (current as of 2021), serves under the Minister and Deputy Minister of Health.

The department is the authoritative agency in the province regarding the COVID-19 pandemic in Manitoba.

== Overview ==
Manitoba Health funds a social program that is delivered partially by the department and partially through grant agencies, arm's-length service delivery organizations (SDOs), independent physicians, or other service providers paid via fee-for-service or alternate means. Most direct services are delivered through the Regional Health Authorities (RHAs) and other health care organizations. Manitoba Health, on the other hand, directly delivers only a small portion of the program itself, particularly managing the direct operations of Selkirk Mental Health Centre, Cadham Provincial Laboratory, and 3 northern nursing stations. The department also administers such non-devolved health services as Pharmacare, insured benefits, fee-for-service physician services, etc. The ultimate result is an intricate combination of insured benefits, funded services provided via public institutions—ranging from community-based primary care to third-party teaching hospitals—and publicly regulated but privately provided services, such as for-profit personal care homes.

Manitoba Health also plays a role in policy, planning, funding, and oversight that ensures that SDOs (e.g., RHA, CancerCare Manitoba, Addictions Foundation of Manitoba, and over 100 primarily non-profit organizations) are accountable to provide high-quality services at a reasonable cost.

== Minister of Health ==
Minister of Health, Seniors and Long–Term Care
- Incumbent; Uzoma Asagwara
- Seat: Room 302, Manitoba Legislative Building
- Constituting instrument: The Public Health Act (C.C.S.M. c. P210)
- Precursor: Minister of Health, Minister of Health and Seniors Care
- Deputy: Karen Herd
- Salary: $41,000 (2019/20)

The Minister of Health is the cabinet minister responsible for Manitoba Health, guided by the Public Health Act of Manitoba.

List of Health Ministers in Manitoba
Name	Party	Took office	Left office	Official title
Charles Cannon	UFM/Prog	November 19, 1924	September 9, 1927	Minister of Health
Edward Montgomery	UFM/Prog	November 19, 1924	September 9, 1927	Minister of Health and Public Welfare
Isaac Griffiths	Lib-Prog	May 28, 1935	November 4, 1940	Minister of Health and Public Welfare
James McLenaghen	PC	November 4, 1940	February 5, 1944	Minister of Health
Ivan Schultz	Lib-Prog	February 5, 1944	November 7, 1952	Minister of Health
Francis Bell	Lib-Prog	November 7, 1952	January 25, 1955	Minister of Health and Public Welfare
Robert Bend	Lib-Prog	January 25, 1955	June 30, 1958	Minister of Health and Public Welfare
George Johnson	PC	June 30, 1958	December 9, 1963	Minister of Health and Public Welfare
Charles Witney	PC	December 9, 1963	September 24, 1968	Minister of Health
George Johnson	PC	September 24, 1968	July 15, 1969	Minister of Health
Sidney Green	NDP	July 15, 1969	December 18, 1969	Minister of Health and Social Development
Rene Toupin	NDP	December 18, 1969	January 28, 1974	Minister of Health and Social Development
Saul Miller	NDP	January 28, 1974	December 23, 1974	Minister of Health and Social Development
Laurent Desjardins	NDP	December 23, 1974	October 24, 1977	Minister of Health and Social Development
Louis Sherman	PC	October 24, 1977	November 30, 1981	Minister of Health and Social Development (till Oct 1978) Minister of Health and Community Services (till Nov 15, 1979)
Laurent Desjardins	NDP	November 30, 1981	September 21, 1987	Minister of Health
Wilson Parasiuk	NDP	September 21, 1987	May 9, 1988	Minister of Health
Donald Orchard	PC	May 9, 1988	September 10, 1993	Minister of Health
James McCrae	PC	September 10, 1993	January 6, 1997	Minister of Health
Darren Praznik	PC	January 6, 1997	February 5, 1999	Minister of Health
Eric Stefanson	PC	February 5, 1999	October 5, 1999	Minister of Health
David Chomiak	NDP	October 5, 1999	October 12, 2004	Minister of Health
Tim Sale	NDP	October 12, 2004	September 28, 2006	Minister of Health
Theresa Oswald	NDP	September 28, 2006	October 18, 2013	Minister of Health
Erin Selby	NDP	October 18, 2013	November 3, 2014	Minister of Health
Sharon Blady	NDP	November 3, 2014	May 3, 2016	Minister of Health
Kelvin Goertzen	PC	May 3, 2016	July 31, 2018	Minister of Health, Seniors and Active Living
Cameron Friesen	PC	August 1, 2018	January 5, 2021	Minister of Health, Seniors and Active Living
Heather Stefanson	PC	January 5, 2021	August 18, 2021	Minister of Health and Seniors Care
Audrey Gordon	PC	August 18, 2021	January 18, 2022	Minister of Health and Seniors Care
Audrey Gordon	PC	January 18, 2022	October 18, 2023	Minister of Health
Uzoma Asagwara	NDP	October 18, 2023	incumbent	Minister of Health, Seniors, and Long-term Care

== See also ==
- Winnipeg Regional Health Authority
- Manitoba Health Research Council
- Manitoba Centre for Health Policy
- Public Health Agency of Canada
- Health Council of Canada
- Canadian Institutes of Health Research
