= Andrew Watson Myles =

Canadian politician

Member of the Manitoba Legislative Assembly for Cypress
- In office 1915–1920
- Preceded by: George Steel
- Succeeded by: William Spinks

Personal details
- Born: February 18, 1884; Rathwell, Manitoba, Canada
- Died: May 9, 1970 (aged 86)
- Political party: Liberal

Andrew Watson Myles (February 18, 1884 – May 9, 1970) was a politician in Manitoba, Canada. He served in the Legislative Assembly of Manitoba from 1915 to 1920 as a Liberal, and made an unsuccessful bid for the leadership of the Manitoba Liberal Party in 1927.

Myles was born in Rathwell, Manitoba, and was educated at Manitoba College and Northwestern University in Chicago. He received a D.D.S. degree, and worked as a dentist after 1908. In religion, Myles was a Presbyterian.

On December 13, 1913, Myles ran for the Liberal Party of Canada in a federal by-election in the riding of Macdonald. He lost to Conservative candidate Alex Morrison, 3855 votes to 2939.

Myles became one of several Liberal candidates elected to the provincial legislature in the provincial election of 1915, as premier Tobias Norris led the Liberal Party to a landslide victory of 40 seats out of 47. Myles defeated Conservative incumbent George Steel in Cypress, 851 votes to 789. He did not seek re-election in 1920.

He ran for the leadership of the Manitoba Liberal Party in 1927, but was defeated by Hugh Robson, a respected judge with no prior political experience. He also ran in the provincial election of 1927 in Assiniboia, but finished a distant fourth out of five candidates.
