= Joseph Lusignan =

Canadian politician

Joseph Prospere Lusignan (August 27, 1877 – December 23, 1967) was a politician in Manitoba, Canada. He served in the Legislative Assembly of Manitoba from 1927 to 1932, as a member of the Conservative Party.

Lusignan was born to Elli Lusignan and Milina Allaire, French Canadians living in Marlboro, Massachusetts, in the United States of America. He came to Canada in 1880, was educated at rural schools, and worked as a farmer. He served as a municipal councillor in Manitoba for fifteen years. In 1901, he married Louisa Foster. Lusignan lived in Somerset.

He was elected to the Manitoba legislature in the 1927 provincial election, defeating Progressive incumbent George Compton in the constituency of Manitou. The Conservatives formed the official opposition after this election, and Lusignan served for the next five years on the opposition benches. He was defeated by Liberal-Progressive candidate Frank McIntosh in the 1932 election.
