= Ewan McPherson =

Canadian politician (1878–1954)

Ewan Alexander McPherson (January 27, 1878 – November 18, 1954) was a politician in Manitoba, Canada. He served in the House of Commons of Canada from 1926 to 1930. He was also a member of the Legislative Assembly of Manitoba from 1914 to 1920 and from 1932 to 1936, and served as a cabinet minister in the government of John Bracken.

== Biography ==
McPherson was born in Worth County, Missouri, and arrived in Canada with his family in 1879. He was educated at Portage la Prairie, and worked as a barrister. He was called to the bar in 1904, and became a bench member of the Manitoba Bar Association in 1915. In 1916, he was named King's Counsel. In 1904, McPherson married Winnifred Mabel Finn.

He first ran for the Manitoba legislature in the 1910 provincial election, as a Liberal in the Portage la Prairie constituency. He was defeated, losing to Conservative cabinet minister Hugh Armstrong by 199 votes. McPherson ran again in the 1914 election, and defeated Armstrong by ten votes.

The Conservative administration of Rodmond Roblin was forced to resign amid scandal in 1915. The house was dissolved, and another election called. McPherson was re-elected, defeating Conservative candidate Fawcett Taylor by 258 votes. For the next five years, he served as a backbench supporter of Tobias Norris's administration.

McPherson was defeated in the 1920 election, losing to Fawcett Taylor by 287 votes. Taylor's public profile had increased between 1915 and 1920, and he was chosen as leader of the Manitoba Conservative Party two years later.

McPherson did not contest the 1922 provincial election, but instead turned his attention to federal politics. He was selected by the Liberal Party of Canada to run against Conservative Prime Minister Arthur Meighen in the federal election of 1926. He was successful, upsetting Meighen by 428 votes in the federal riding of Portage la Prairie. The Liberal Party won the election, and McPherson served for four years as a backbench supporter of William Lyon Mackenzie King's government.

The Liberals were defeated in the 1930 provincial election, and McPherson lost his seat to Conservative candidate William Herbert Burns by 142 votes. After this loss, he turned his attention to provincial politics again.

In 1922, the United Farmers of Manitoba unexpectedly won a majority of seats in the Manitoba parliament and formed government as the Progressive Party. With Mackenzie King's support, the Manitoba Liberal Party formed an electoral alliance with the Progressive Party in 1932. Although he did not yet have a seat in the legislature, McPherson was appointed to John Bracken's cabinet on May 27, 1932 as Provincial Treasurer.

In the 1932 provincial election, McPherson made the questionable decision of challenging Conservative leader Fawcett Taylor again in Portage la Prairie. Although Bracken's "Liberal-Progressives" were re-elected with a majority government, McPherson went down to a resounding defeat. He had to wait until July 16, 1932 to run in a deferred election in the sprawling northern constituency of Rupertsland, and even here his election was not certain. He was forced to face another pro-government candidate, incumbent Progressive Herbert Beresford, and won by only 97 votes.

Notwithstanding his difficulties in the election, McPherson continued to serve as Provincial Treasurer for the parliament that followed. He was also named Municipal Commissioner on May 10, 1935. He did not seek re-election in 1936. Some federal Liberals hoped that McPherson would replace Bracken as premier, but this did not come to pass.

After leaving politics, McPherson served as Chief Justice of the Court of King's Bench of Manitoba from 1937 to 1944 and then was named Manitoba Court of Appeal in 1944. He held the latter position until his death of a heart attack while attending his son's wedding anniversary in Kenora, Ontario in 1954.
