= James Bryson Baird =

Canadian politician (1859–1939)

13th Speaker of the Legislative Assembly of Manitoba
- In office January 6, 1916 – January 24, 1922
- Preceded by: James Johnson
- Succeeded by: Philippe Adjutor Talbot

Member of the Legislative Assembly of Manitoba for Mountain
- In office March 7, 1907 – July 18, 1922
- Preceded by: Daniel A. McIntyre
- Succeeded by: Charles Cannon

1st Mayor of the Village of Pilot Mound
- In office 1904–1907
- Preceded by: Village reincorporated
- Succeeded by: Robert Dickson Ferguson

Personal details
- Born: March 6, 1859 Appleton, Canada West
- Died: November 6, 1939 (aged 80) Pilot Mound, Manitoba
- Party: Liberal
- Occupation: Merchant and cattle dealer

James Bryson Baird (March 6, 1859 – November 6, 1939) was a politician in Manitoba, Canada. He served in the Legislative Assembly of Manitoba from 1907 to 1922, and was Speaker of the Assembly from 1916 to 1922. Baird was a member of the Liberal Party.

Baird was born in Appleton, Canada West (now Ontario), and educated at Appleton Public School. He later moved to Manitoba, and worked as a merchant and cattle dealer. He was elected as the first mayor of Pilot Mound, Manitoba, and served three successive terms without opposition. He was also a postmaster and president of the local Board of Trade, and served eight years as chairman of the public school board.

He first ran for the Manitoba legislature in a by-election held on April 27, 1905, to replace former Liberal leader Thomas Greenway in the Mountain constituency. He lost to Conservative Daniel A. McIntyre by 146 votes.

Baird ran again in the 1907 provincial election, and defeated McIntyre by 433 votes. Rodmond Roblin's Conservatives were returned with a majority government in this election, and Baird sat as an opposition member. He was re-elected by fairly comfortable margins in the elections of 1910 and 1914.

In 1915, the Roblin government was forced to resign amid a corruption scandal. Another election was called, which the Liberals won with a landslide majority. Baird was selected as Speaker of the Legislature on January 6, 1916.

The Liberals were reduced to a minority government in the 1920 provincial election, and Baird was re-elected over his Farmer opponent by a reduced majority. He received a second term as Speaker on February 10, 1921.

The Liberal government was defeated in the legislature in early 1922. Baird lost his seat to Charles Cannon of the United Farmers of Manitoba in the 1922 provincial election.

== See also ==
- Politics of Canada
