= Hugh McKenzie =

Hugh McKenzie may refer to:

- Hugh McKenzie (VC) (1885–1917), Canadian recipient of the Victoria Cross,
- Hugh McKenzie (Australian politician) (1853–1942), member of the Victorian Legislative Assembly
- Hugh McKenzie (Manitoba politician) (1870–1957), member of the Legislative Assembly of Manitoba
- Hugh McKenzie (Ontario politician) (1840–1893), Ontario farmer and political figure
