= Francis Campbell Bell =

Canadian politician (1892-1968)

Francis Campbell Bell (May 31, 1892 in Clearwater, Manitoba – May 10, 1968) was a politician in Manitoba, Canada. He served in the Legislative Assembly of Manitoba from 1936 to 1958 as a Liberal-Progressive Member of the Legislative Assembly, and was a cabinet minister in the government of Douglas Campbell.

The son of Thomas Bell and Annie Edith Reynolds, Bell was educated in Clearwater and was hired by the Union Bank after he completed his schooling. He served overseas with the Canadian military for three years. In 1916, he married Eva Wright Rumbal. After his return, Bell became a bank manager at Rosebank. He was transferred to McAuley after a few months. He served as a secretary-treasurer for the Rural Municipality of Archie.

He was first elected to the Manitoba legislature in the 1936 provincial election, defeating Conservative candidate W.C. Wroth by only twenty-seven votes in the rural constituency of Birtle. He defeated Wroth by a greater margin in the 1941 election, and was returned without difficulty in the elections of 1945 and 1953. In the 1949 election, Bell was elected without opposition.

After serving as a backbencher for over twelve years, Bell was appointed to cabinet on December 14, 1948 as Douglas Campbell's Minister of Agriculture. He served in this capacity until November 7, 1952, when he was named Minister of Health and Public Welfare. Further cabinet shuffles saw him named as Minister of Public Works (January 25, 1955) and Minister of Mines and Natural Resources (July 6, 1956). Manitoba Co-operative Commonwealth Federation leader Lloyd Stinson once described him as "competent but unspectacular".

The Liberal-Progressives were defeated in the 1958 election, and Bell lost to Progressive Conservative candidate John Thompson by 1,273 votes in the redistributed constituency of Virden. He formally resigned from cabinet on June 30, 1958.

His brother James R. Bell was a provincial livestock commissioner and later served as deputy minister of agriculture.

Bell died in Winnipeg at the age of 76.
