= David Campbell (Manitoba politician) =

Canadian politician

David Campbell (1870 – 25 August 1932) was a Manitoba politician. When the provincial Liberals merged with John Bracken's Progressives in 1932, Campbell led a group of dissident, anti-merger Liberals into the subsequent election.

The group was known as the "Continuing Liberals", and ran candidates in 13 seats. Some within the new "Liberal-Progressive" alliance claimed that this new Liberal party was receiving financial support from the province's Conservatives, as a means of dividing the Liberal vote.

Shortly before election day, the party claimed they would hold the balance of power in the next parliament. This prediction proved incorrect; they failed to win any seats, and Campbell finished a poor fourth in St. Boniface (despite being the city's mayor at the time). The "Continuing Liberals" ceased to exist after the election, and the "Liberal-Progressives" remained in government until 1958.
