= William Clubb =

Canadian politician (1884–1962)

William Reid (Billy) Clubb (October 7, 1884 – August 11, 1962) was a politician in Manitoba, Canada. He served in the Legislative Assembly of Manitoba from 1922 to 1941, and was a prominent cabinet minister in the government of John Bracken.

== Early life ==
Clubb was born in Morris, Manitoba, the son of George Clubb and Alice Jix, and was educated at Manitoba public schools, the Winnipeg Business College and Manitoba Agricultural College. He worked as a farmer, and served on the Morris municipal council from 1916 to 1920. In 1913, he married Gertrude Barbara Kastner.

== Political career ==
He was first elected to the Manitoba legislature in the provincial election of 1920. Clubb ran as an independent farmer candidate in the constituency of Morris, and defeated rival candidate Alex Ayotte by 165 votes. For the next two years, he sat with a small farmer's caucus led by William Robson.

In 1921, Clubb served with John Bracken on a special committee to review the prices of oil and gas for Manitoba's agricultural community. He was impressed with Bracken's knowledge of the province, and with his presence of mind in the discussions.

He later joined the United Farmers of Manitoba, and defeated Ayotte by a greater margin in the 1922 election. The United Farmers and their allies won an unexpected majority government in the 1922 election, and took office as the Progressive Party of Manitoba. As the UFM did not have a leader, the party caucus met on July 20, 1922 to choose a premier. Clubb recommended Bracken for the position, and his name was allowed to stand. At the end of the meeting, the only others candidates still under consideration were federal Members of Parliament Thomas Crerar and Bob Hoey.

On July 21, 1922, Clubb telephoned Bracken to inform him that he was one of three candidates under consideration for the job. Bracken, who had not previously considered a career in politics, allowed his name to stand after a brief discussion.

The next day, Crerar and Hoey both rejected the UFM offer. Bracken was non-committal, and but made a strong impression on the party caucus. He was persuaded to accept the position, and appointed Clubb as his Minister of Public Works. He was formally sworn into cabinet on August 8, 1922. The custom of the age required him to resign and contest a by-election; he was returned without opposition. Clubb was the only member of Bracken's cabinet with prior legislative experience, and was one of Bracken's most trusted confidantes in the government's early years.

Re-elected by a landslide in the 1927 election, Clubb helped oversee a controversial leasing arrangement with the Winnipeg Electric Company (WEC) in the late 1920s. This arrangement provoked a scandal in 1929, when Clubb acknowledged before a royal commission that he had purchased WEC shares the previous year, when negotiations were still in progress. Bracken initially defended Clubb, but was pressured into accepting his resignation from cabinet on February 22, 1929.

In Clubb's defence, it may be noted that other legislators from various parties had also purchased shares while the negotiations were in progress. In fact, his share purchase was arranged by John Thomas Haig, a prominent Conservative legislator and personal friend. Clubb maintained that he did nothing improper in the transaction. Bracken never regarded Clubb's suspension from cabinet as permanent, and on May 18, 1929, he was returned to cabinet in his previous portfolio.

In late 1929, Clubb and other prominent ministers supported a policy of cooperation with the provincial Liberal Party. This policy of cooperation led to a formal alliance in 1932, and Clubb was re-elected in that year's provincial election as a supporter of the "Liberal-Progressive" government. The parties were effectively merged after the election, and government members became known as Liberal-Progressives.

Just before the election, Clubb had been given additional cabinet responsibility as Manitoba's first Minister of Labour. He continued to hold both the Public Works and Labour portfolios throughout the 1930s.

Clubb faced a difficult re-election in the 1936 campaign, and resigned from cabinet in 1940 with the creation of an all-party coalition government. He did not seek re-election in 1941.

== Later life ==
From 1940 to 1956, he was commissioner of the Manitoba liquor board. Clubb was also an avid curler and flyer.

He died in Morris at the age of 77.
