= Edward William Montgomery =

Canadian politician

Edward William Montgomery (1865 – September 27, 1948) was a politician in Manitoba, Canada. He served in the Legislative Assembly of Manitoba from 1927 to 1932, and served as a cabinet minister in the government of John Bracken.

He was born in Canada East and came to Stonewall, Manitoba with his parents in 1877. Montgomery was educated at Manitoba College, taught school in Brandon and went on to study medicine at Manitoba Medical College. He entered the practice of medicine in Winnipeg in 1892. Montgomery was president of the Canadian Medical Association in 1922. He also served as professor of medicine at the Manitoba Medical College.

He was elected to the Manitoba legislature as a Progressive in the 1927 provincial election, for the constituency of Winnipeg. At the time, Winnipeg elected ten members by a single transferable ballot. Montgomery finished seventh on the first count, and was declared elected for the final position on the twenty-first count.

On September 9, 1927, he was appointed Minister of Health in Bracken's government. His position was restyled as "Minister of Health and Public Welfare" on July 12, 1928.

Montgomery was defeated in the 1932 provincial election. He finished in fifteenth place on the first count in Winnipeg and was later eliminated from contention on the nineteenth count.

After retiring from politics, he served as chair of the provincial Board of Health until his death in Winnipeg in 1948.
