= George Compton (Canadian politician) =

Canadian politician

Member of the Legislative Assembly of Manitoba
- In office 1922–1927
- Preceded by: John Ridley
- Succeeded by: Joseph Lusignan

Personal details
- Born: October 12, 1872 Wiltshire, England
- Died: April 30, 1950 (aged 77)
- Party: United Farmers of Manitoba

George Compton (October 12, 1872 – April 30, 1950) was a politician in Manitoba, Canada. He served in the Legislative Assembly of Manitoba from 1922 to 1927.

Compton was born in Wiltshire, England, and came to Canada with his family in 1873. He was educated at the Mound School, worked as a farmer, and served as a councillor and reeve in Pembina, Manitoba.

Compton first sought election to the Manitoba legislature in the 1920 provincial campaign, running as an "Independent Farmer" candidate in Manitou. He lost to Conservative John Ridley by 259 votes. Two years later, in the 1922 campaign, he ran as a candidate of the United Farmers of Manitoba (UFM) and defeated Ridley by a narrow margin.

The UFM won the 1922 election, and formed government as the Progressive Party of Manitoba. Compton served as a backbench supporter of John Bracken's ministry for the next five years. He was defeated by Conservative Joseph Lusignan in the 1927 election.
