= Mungo Lewis =

Canadian politician

Mungo Turnbull Lewis (November 13, 1894 – January 12, 1969) was a politician in Manitoba, Canada. He served in the Legislative Assembly of Manitoba from 1936 to 1945.

== Early life and career ==
Lewis was born at Rhyl, in North Wales. His family moved to Canada in 1906, and settled in Stonewall, Manitoba. Lewis received his early education in these communities, and was granted a Doctor of Veterinary Medicine degree from St. Joseph's Veterinary College in St. Joseph, Missouri in 1923. He returned to Stonewall to practise as a veterinarian, and later served as Manitoba's provincial veterinarian from 1929 to 1932.

== Legislator ==
Lewis was elected to the Manitoba legislature in the 1936 provincial election as a Conservative, defeating Liberal-Progressive incumbent William C. McKinnell by 383 votes in Rockwood. The Liberal-Progressives formed a minority government after the election, and Lewis served with his party on the opposition benches.

The Conservatives joined the Liberal-Progressives in a coalition government in 1940, and in this manner Lewis became a backbench supporter of John Bracken's administration. He was re-elected in the 1941 provincial election as a pro-coalition independent, and later aligned with the Liberal-Progressives. He was defeated in the 1945 provincial election, losing to Progressive Conservative candidate W.J. Campbell by 298 votes.

== After politics ==
Lewis established a veterinary practice in Winnipeg during his legislative career, and continued to practise in the city after leaving political life. He died on January 12, 1969.

Legislative Assembly of Manitoba
Preceded by William C. McKinnell	Member of the Legislative Assembly for Rockwood; 1936–1945	Succeeded by W.J. Campbell
