= William Robson (Canadian politician) =

Canadian politician

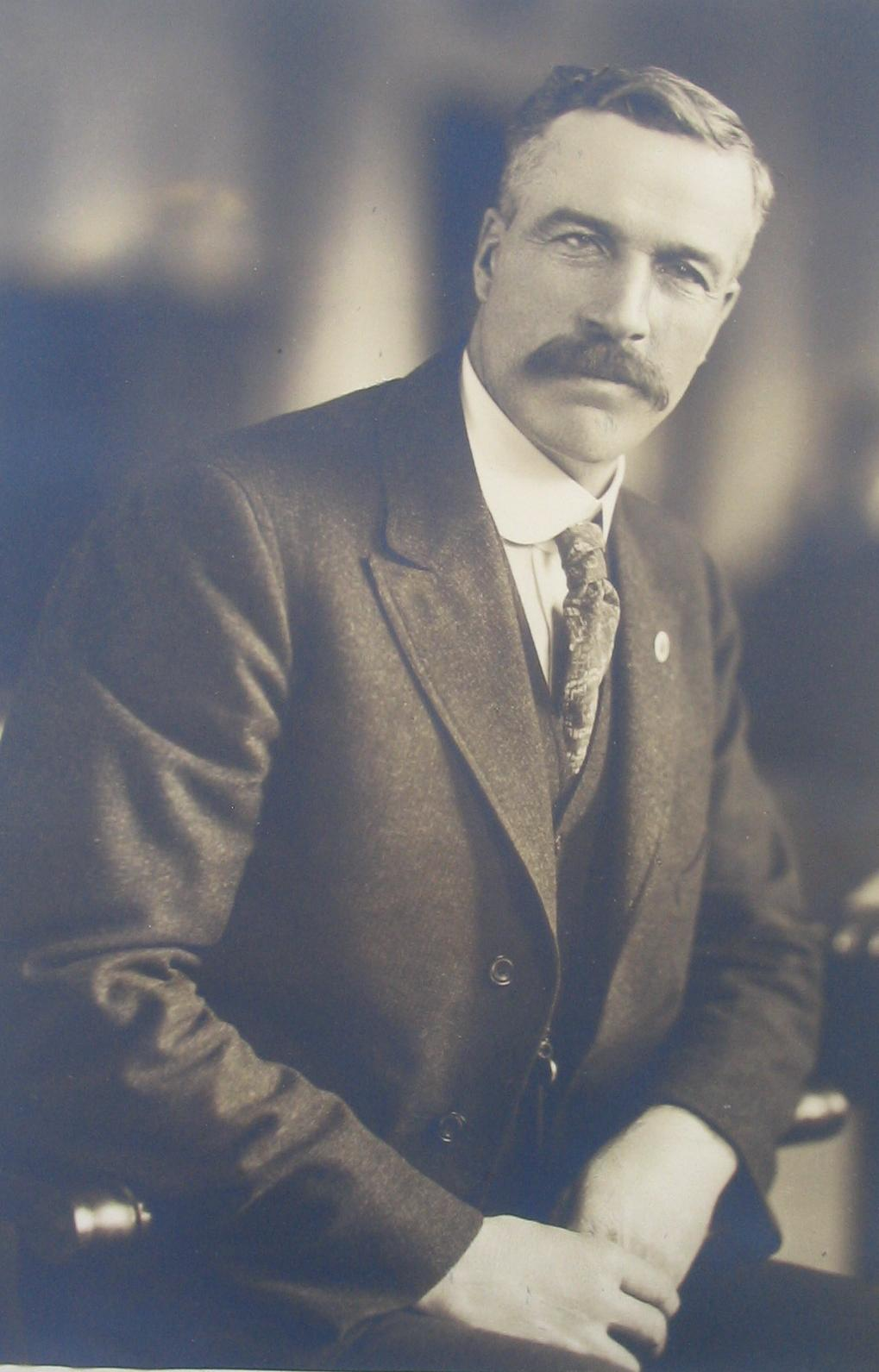
- Robson in 1922

MLA for Glenwood
- In office 1920–1922
- Preceded by: James Breakey
- Succeeded by: James Breakey

Personal details
- Born: October 3, 1864; Scarborough, North Yorkshire, England
- Died: c. 1941 (aged 76); Duluth, Minnesota, U.S.
- Cause of death: Car accident

William Robson (October 3, 1864 – c. July 1941) was a Manitoba politician and the leader of the province's Independent-Farmers party in 1921 and 1922.

== Life ==
Born in Scarborough, Yorkshire, England, Robson arrived in Canada with his parents at the age of two. He worked as a farmer and was a shareholder in the Grain Grower's Guide, a popular farmer's newspaper in Canada. Robson also served as both a councillor and reeve during the 1910s.

In 1920, Robson was one of 12 "farmer's candidates" elected to the Manitoba legislature. He defeated future Liberal leader James Breakey in Glenwood by four votes. Robson was subsequently chosen as the leader of the Independent-Farmers, the name adopted by the victorious candidates for their parliamentary caucus.

The Independent-Farmers were a diverse group and did not continue beyond the dissolution of the legislature in 1922. Afterward, the United Farmers of Manitoba (UFM) represented the province's farming community in a more organized manner.

Robson did not run for re-election in 1922 and did not serve in the government of UFM Premier John Bracken.
