= William H. Spinks =

Canadian politician

William Hooey Spinks (July 23, 1873 – May 25, 1949) was a politician in Manitoba, Canada. He served in the Legislative Assembly of Manitoba from 1920 to 1932, as a member of the Conservative Party.

Spinks was born in Blackstock, Ontario, the son of William Spinks and Sussannah Hooey, and was educated at public schools in the Township of Cartwright. His family came west in 1894 and settled near Treherne, Manitoba. He worked as a farmer, and was the reeve of the Rural Municipality of South Norfolk in Manitoba for thirteen years. Spinks was a member of the Grain Growers' Association, was president of the Agricultural Society for eight years, and was a freemason and Orangeman. In 1902, he married Mary Eleanor Jackson.

He was first elected to the Manitoba legislature in the 1920 provincial election, defeating Liberal incumbent Andrew W. Myles by 180 votes in the rural constituency of Cypress. Spinks was one of only eight conservatives elected to the fifty-five member legislature in this cycle. He was again successful in the 1922 election, defeating John Young of the United Farmers of Manitoba by 47 votes as the Conservatives fell to seven seats across the province.

The Conservative Party recovered to fifteen seats in the 1927 election, as Spinks defeated Progressive candidate Andrew Moore by 144 votes. Five years later, in the 1932 election, he lost to Liberal-Progressive James Christie by 256 votes.

He campaigned for the House of Commons of Canada in the 1935 federal election as a candidate of the Conservative Party of Canada, but lost to Liberal-Progressive candidate William Gilbert Weir. Spinks had retired from active farm work by this time.

In 1937, he moved to Hamilton, Ontario. Spinks died in 1949 while visiting Toronto, Ontario.

His daughter Olive married Lloyd Stinson.
