= John Donald McIntosh =

Canadian politician

John Donald McIntosh (July 19, 1850 – January 15, 1902) was a miller, farmer and political figure in Manitoba. He represented Manitou from 1896 to 1899 in the Legislative Assembly of Manitoba as a Liberal.

== Background ==
McIntosh was born in McIntosh's Mill, Yonge Township, Leeds County, Canada West, the son of John McIntosh and Janet Armstrong. In 1875, McIntosh married Elizabeth Westbrook and then came to Manitoba in 1880. McIntosh died in Manitou, Manitoba in 1902.

Their son Frank also served in the Manitoba assembly.
