= William Morton (Manitoba politician) =

Canadian politician (1884-1958)

William Morton (July 3, 1884, in Gladstone, Manitoba – January 28, 1958) was a politician in Manitoba, Canada. He served in the Legislative Assembly of Manitoba from 1927 to 1958, and was a cabinet minister in the governments of John Bracken, Stuart Garson and Douglas Campbell. His father, Thomas Lewis Morton, was a member of the assembly from 1888 to 1903.

Morton was educated at St. John's College in Winnipeg, and was prominent in athletics, notably football, hockey and curling. He was a councillor in the municipality of Westbourne from 1913 to 1917, and was its reeve from 1917 to 1927.

He was first elected to the Manitoba legislature in the 1927 provincial election as a Progressive, in the rural constituency of Gladstone. He was returned as a Liberal-Progressive in the 1932 election, after the two parties formed an alliance.

Re-elected again in the 1936 election, Morton was promoted to cabinet on November 22, 1939, as Municipal Commissioner in John Bracken's government. On February 14, 1944, he was given additional cabinet responsibilities as Minister under the Manitoba Telephone Act.

When Douglas Campbell became Premier of Manitoba on December 14, 1948, he relieved Morton of the Municipal Affairs portfolio, but kept him as minister under the Manitoba Telephone Act, Minister under the Manitoba Power Commission Act, and Minister of Public Utilities under the Municipal and Public Utility Board Act. His title was later simplified to Minister of Public Works and Minister of Public Utilities. In these portfolios, Morton continued Campbell's work in providing electricity to the rural areas of the province.

In 1952, Morton approved a motion which gave aboriginal Canadians in Manitoba the right to vote in provincial elections.

Morton holds the unique distinction of having been returned without opposition in four consecutive elections: 1941, 1945, 1949 and 1953.

Morton stepped down from his ministerial portfolios on January 28, 1955, and served as a minister without portfolio until his death in Winnipeg in early 1958.

Manitoba Cooperative Commonwealth Federation leader Lloyd Stinson described Morton as the "strong silent" man of Campbell's administration. He was a loyal supporter of Campbell, and often used his extensive ties to municipal politicians for the government's benefit.

In 1907, he married Mary Mathilda Manwaring. Morton's son, William Lewis Morton, was a prominent Canadian historian. There is currently a William Morton Collegiate in Gladstone, Manitoba.
