= Charles Cannon (Manitoba politician) =

Canadian politician (1866–1951)

Charles Reginald Lionel Cannon (November 24, 1866 – June 9, 1951) was a politician in Manitoba, Canada. He served in the Legislative Assembly of Manitoba from 1922 to 1927, and was a cabinet minister in the government of John Bracken.

Cannon was born in Southport, Lancashire, England, the son of Reverend J. D. Cannon and Catherine Dakeyne. His grandfather and uncle were mayors of Bolton, Lancashire, and were pioneers in cotton spinning manufacture during the 1850s and 1860s. Cannon was educated at Liverpool College and Harstporpoins College in Sussex, and passed Oxford and Cambridge first-class extension examinations in 1884. He moved to Canada in 1885. In 1888, he married Adah Wigham.

Cannon worked as a farmer and served as director of the Belmont Creamery Corporation. He was also a police magistrate, and served as reeve of Strathcona for nine and a half years. He was an active community member, and was for many years closely associated with the Liberal Party. In the early 1920s, he endorsed the decision of the United Farmers of Manitoba (UFM) to field candidates in provincial elections.

Cannon ran for the UFM in the 1922 provincial election, and defeated Liberal incumbent James Baird in the constituency of Mountain. The UFM won the election, and formed government as the Progressive Party of Manitoba. Cannon initially served as a government backbencher, and was promoted to cabinet on December 3, 1923 as Minister of Education.

During this period, newly selected cabinet ministers were required to resign their constituency seats to seek re-election as provincial office holders. These elections were usually pro forma affairs in the 1920s, as ministers were not generally opposed by candidates of other parties. Cannon, however, faced a challenge from Conservative candidate George Fraser, whom he defeated without difficulty on December 24, 1923.

On November 12, 1924, Cannon was given the additional position of Minister of Public Welfare. He resigned the Education portfolio on April 21, 1927, and was named Provincial Secretary and Provincial Lands Commissioner.

Cannon was defeated by Liberal candidate Irving Cleghorn in the 1927 provincial election, losing by eighty-four votes. He formally resigned from cabinet on September 9, 1927.

Cannon died in Belmont and was buried there.
