= W. J. Campbell =

Canadian politician

William J. Campbell (May 15, 1885 – September 29, 1949) was a politician in Manitoba, Canada. He served in the Legislative Assembly of Manitoba from 1945 to 1949, as a member of the Progressive Conservative Party.

The son of Duncan Campbell Jr., Campbell was born in Teulon, Manitoba. In 1919, he married Isabel Fraser. Campbell was a member of the council for the Rural Municipality of Rockwood from 1922 to 1937 and served as reeve from 1942 to 1945, when he resigned to run for election provincially. He was elected to the provincial legislature in the 1945 election, defeating Liberal-Progressive incumbent Mungo Lewis by 297 votes in the Rockwood constituency.

The Liberal-Progressives and Progressive Conservatives were partners in a coalition government during this period, and Campbell sat as a government backbencher during his time in the legislature. He died in office in 1949.
