= Adalbert Poole =

Canadian politician

Adalbert James Moses Poole (December 11, 1881 – September 26, 1970) was a politician in Manitoba, Canada. He served in the Legislative Assembly of Manitoba from 1927 to 1936 as a member of the Progressive Party.

Poole was born in Neepawa, Manitoba, the son of Timothy Poole and Francis Ducklow, and was educated at a rural school and business college. He worked as a farmer, and was a director of the Manitoba Wheat Pool for three years. In 1909, he married Alice Watson. Poole also served as the president of the United Farmers of Manitoba from 1925 to 1928, and of the Canadian Council of Agriculture from 1927 to 1928.

He was first elected to the Manitoba legislature in the 1927 provincial election, defeating Conservative candidate E.H. Whelpley in the constituency of Beautiful Plains. In the 1932 election, he returned over Conservative John Poole.

Poole served as a backbench supporter of John Bracken's government throughout his time in the legislature. He was defeated in the 1936 election, losing to John Poole by 183 votes.

Poole's political philosophy shifted to the left after his defeat. He joined the Cooperative Commonwealth Federation, and was a candidate for the party in the 1945 provincial election. He again lost to John Poole, and did not run for provincial office again.

He died in Neepawa at the age of 88.
