= Arthur Berry (politician) =

Canadian politician (1879–1943)

Arthur Ritchie Berry (November 28, 1879 – July 23, 1943) was a politician in Manitoba, Canada. He served in the Legislative Assembly of Manitoba from 1922 to 1936.

Berry was born in Owen Sound, Ontario and came to the Manitou district with his parents as an infant. They later emigrated to North Dakota. In 1895, Berry settled on a Dominion Lands Act homestead in the Umatilla district in the Grandview area. He married Hilda Longmuir in 1910. He worked as a farmer. Berry also served as a member of the Grandview town council.

He was first elected to the Manitoba legislature in the 1922 provincial election, as a candidate of the United Farmers of Manitoba (UFM) in the Gilbert Plains constituency. The UFM unexpectedly won a majority of seats in this election, and formed government as the Progressive Party.

Berry was re-elected by a secure majority in the 1927 election. In 1932, the Progressives formed an alliance with the Manitoba Liberal Party, and government members became known as "Liberal-Progressives". Berry was re-elected under this banner in the 1932 campaign, defeating Conservative candidate H.A. Alley by 289 votes. He lost the nomination to G.D. Shortread in 1936.

Throughout his time in the legislature, Berry served as a backbench supporter of John Bracken's government.

He died in the Winnipeg General Hospital after being ill for two weeks.
