= Herbert Beresford =

Canadian politician

Herbert Grahame Beresford (November 19, 1880 – June 15, 1938) was a land surveyor and politician in Manitoba, Canada. He served in the Legislative Assembly of Manitoba from 1927 to 1932.

Beresford was born in Tillicoultry, Scotland, and was raised in nearby Dollar. Educated at Dollar Academy and the University of St Andrews, he came to Canada in 1903 and worked as a land surveyor, serving as president of the Association of Manitoba Land Surveyors in 1918 and 1919. He was also active in the Scottish Rite of freemasonry.

He was elected to the Manitoba legislature in the 1927 provincial election as an independent Progressive, defeated Liberal Fred C. Hamilton in the sprawling northern constituency of Rupertsland. For the next four years, he served as a supporter of John Bracken's government.

In 1932, the provincial Liberal and Progressive parties formed an electoral alliance to prevent the Conservative Party from winning the next election. In most constituencies, Liberals and Progressives united behind a single candidate. In Rupertsland, however, Beresford was challenged by Liberal cabinet minister Ewan McPherson, who had been defeated in Portage la Prairie. McPherson won the challenge, ending Beresford's career as a legislator.
