= Michael Ewanchuk =

Ukrainian Canadian educator and historian

Michael Ewanchuk (14 March 1908 – 26 August 2004) was a Ukrainian Canadian educator and historian. He held a Doctor of Law degree from the University of Winnipeg and a Doctor of Canon Law from St. John's College of the University of Manitoba. Ewanchuk was born in Gimli, Manitoba. He was raised by his parents, Paraskeva Ewanchuk & Wasyl Ewanchuk, he had 5 other siblings; Nettie Ewanchuk (Bohonos), Mary Ewanchuk (died at age 1), John Ewanchuk, Alexander Ewanchuk, and Peter Ewanchuk (Grain Buyer).

He married his primary teacher Muriel Smith in 1941. They had no children. Muriel encouraged Ewanchuk to visit many places. He wrote 16 books. Muriel died on February 21, 1997, from diabetes. Seven years after the death of his wife, Michael died in Winnipeg, Manitoba.

== Some works ==
- Spruce, Swamp and Stone: A History of the Pioneer Ukrainian Settlements in the Gimli Area by Michael Ewanchuk
  Publisher: Ewanchuk Ewanchuk, Winnipeg. Date Published: 1977 ISBN 978-0-9690768-3-4, ISBN 0-9690768-3-5
- Michael Ewanchuk, William Kurelek: The Suffering Genius Steinbach, Manitoba: Perksen Printers and Ewanchuk Ewanchuk Publishing, 1996
- Ewanchuk, Michael (1977). Vita : A Ukrainian Community. Vol. Books 1-3. Vita, Manitoba: Boundary School Division No. 16.
