= Joseph Henry Cotter =

Canadian politician (1872–1937)

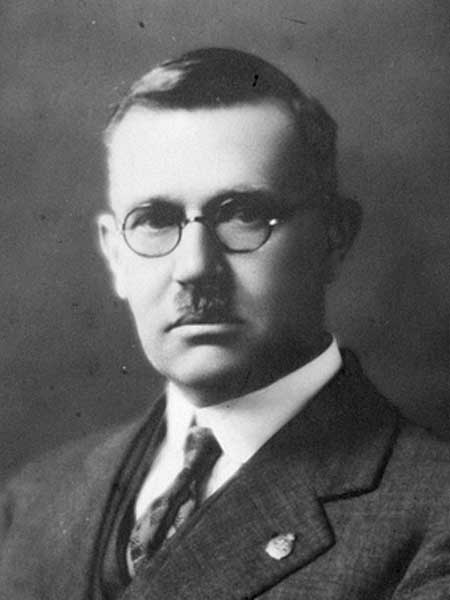

Personal details
- Born: January 1, 1872 Milan, Italy
- Died: September 30, 1937 (aged 65) St. James, Manitoba
- Party: Progressive Conservative Party of Manitoba
- Occupation: Accountant

Military service
- Allegiance: Great Britain
- Rank: Lieutenant
- Unit: 108th Battalion from 1916 to 1919, C.A.P.C

Joseph Henry Cotter (January 1, 1872—September 30, 1937) was a Canadian politician in the Legislative Assembly of Manitoba from 1927 to 1932. He was a member of the Conservative Party.

Cotter was born in Milan, Italy, the son of a Church of England rector in Ireland. He was educated at private schools in the south of Ireland, and came to Canada in 1890. Cotter worked as an accountant, and was for fifteen years the chief accountant of Winnipeg, Manitoba. Active in freemasonry, Cotter was the first master of the St. James Lodge 121.

He served as a school trustee from 1912 to 1915, was a councillor in the municipality of St. James in 1924, and served as its reeve in 1925. From 1925 to 1927, he was the representative of St. James on the Winnipeg Municipality Suburban Board. He served as reeve of St. James a second time in 1928–1929.

From 1916 to 1919, Cotter served overseas in World War I as a lieutenant with the 108th Battalion. He was later transferred to the C.A.P.C.

He was elected to the Manitoba legislature in the 1927 provincial election, defeating Independent Labour Party candidate Richard B. Russell. The Conservatives became the leading opposition party after this election, and Cotter served with his party on the opposition benches. He did not run for re-election in 1932.

He died at St. James, Manitoba on 30 September 1937.
