= Irving Cleghorn =

Canadian politician (1863–1929)

Irving Moffat Cleghorn (August 22, 1863 – November 14, 1929) was a politician in Manitoba, Canada. He served in the Legislative Assembly of Manitoba from 1927 to 1929, as a member of the Manitoba Liberal Party.

Born in Moffat, Scotland, Cleghorn came to Canada with his family at the age of four. They settled in Wingham, Ontario. He studied medicine at the Manitoba Medical College and set up practice in Belmont, Manitoba in 1891, moving to Baldur the following year. Cleghorn also operated a pharmacy in Baldur from 1903 until 1929. He was elected to the Manitoba legislature in the 1927 provincial election, defeating Progressive incumbent Charles Cannon by 84 votes.

The election was won by the Progressive Party. Cleghorn served on the opposition benches for the next two years and died at home in Baldur while still a member of the legislature.
