= William Tobias =

Canadian politician (1892–1941)

William Verner Tobias (March 10, 1892 – October 16, 1941) was a lawyer and political figure in Manitoba. He represented Winnipeg from 1927 to 1932 in the Legislative Assembly of Manitoba as a Conservative member.

He was born in Morden, Manitoba, the son of David Tobias and Venta Zimmerman, and was educated in Winnipeg and at the University of Manitoba. While in university, he gained prominence as a sprinter. Tobias served in the Canadian Expeditionary Force during World War I and was wounded at Passchendaele, receiving the Military Cross. After the war, he studied at the Manitoba Law School and established his own law practice.

Tobias was elected to the provincial legislature in the 1927 provincial election. He was defeated when he ran for reelection in 1932.

Tobias helped establish the General Monash branch of the Canadian Legion, for Jewish veterans, and served as its president until 1940. He died at Deer Lodge military hospital in Winnipeg at the age of 49 after a lengthy illness.
