= John H. Edmison =

Canadian politician

John Henry Edmison (April 5, 1872 – March 22, 1932) was a medical doctor and politician in Manitoba, Canada. He served in the Legislative Assembly of Manitoba from 1922 to 1932.

Edmison was born in Waterdown, Ontario (now Hamilton, Ontario), the son of Reverend Henry Edmison, and was educated in Owen Sound, at Queen's University and at the University of Manitoba. He had a professional medical degree, and worked as a physician. In 1901, he married May A. McMillan.

He was first elected to the Manitoba legislature in the 1922 provincial election, for the constituency of Brandon City. In the previous election, vote-splitting between the Liberal and Conservative parties in Brandon had resulted in the election of Albert E. Smith, a candidate of the Labour Party. In 1922, Edmison ran as an independent endorsed by both the Liberals and Conservatives, and defeated Smith by 1,221 votes.

Edmison remained an independent throughout his time in the legislature. He was re-elected in the 1927 election, defeating candidates of the Labour and Progressive parties. Once again, neither the Liberals nor Conservatives fielded a candidate against him.

He died at home in Brandon shortly before the 1932 election.
