= Frank McIntosh =

Canadian politician

Frank Westbrook McIntosh (August 6, 1879 — July 4, 1951) was a politician in Manitoba, Canada. He served in the Legislative Assembly of Manitoba from 1932 to 1936, as a Liberal-Progressive representative. His father, John McIntosh, had served in the legislature as a Liberal from 1896 to 1899.

The younger McIntosh was born in Lorne Mills, Ontario, and educated in Manitou, Manitoba. His mother was Elizabeth Westbrook. He worked as a farmer, served on the municipal council for three years, and was reeve for the Rural Municipality of Pembina for seven years between 1921 and 1932. In 1930, he was awarded the "Master Farmer" diploma and medal.

He was elected to the Manitoba legislature in the 1932 provincial election, defeating Conservative incumbent Joseph Lusignan by 492 votes in Manitou constituency. The Liberal-Progressives won the election, and McIntosh served as a backbench supporter of John Bracken's government.

He was defeated in the 1936 election, losing to Conservative Hugh Morrison by 351 votes.

McIntosh died in Winnipeg at the age of 71.
