= John Pratt (Canadian politician) =

Canadian politician

John William Pratt, KC (October 22, 1894—November 29, 1973) was a politician in Manitoba, Canada. He served in the Legislative Assembly of Manitoba from 1927 to 1936.

Pratt was born at Hempton, Oxfordshire, England, the son of John W. Pratt and Julia A. Dixon. He was educated at Merchant Taylors' School, London and Hitchin Grammar School, migrating to Canada in 1912. He attended the University of Manitoba, receiving a law degree, and subsequently worked as a barrister-at-law. Pratt enlisted in the R.F.C. in 1918. In 1920, he married Kathleen A. Barnes.

He was the mayor of Birtle, Manitoba in 1926 and 1927, and was a director of the Birtle Agricultural Society. He helped to found the firm of Pratt, Lauman. In 1944, Pratt was named King's Counsel.

Pratt was first elected to the Manitoba legislature in the provincial election of 1927, as a member of the governing Progressive Party. He campaigned in the constituency of Birtle, and defeated candidates from the Liberal and Conservative parties. Shortly after the election, he left the government benches to sit as an independent.

He was re-elected as an Independent Progressive in the 1932 provincial election, defeating Conservative W.C. Wroth by 639 votes. The government did not run a candidate against him. Pratt did not seek re-election in 1936.

He died in Birtle at the age of 79.
