= Hugh McKenzie (Manitoba politician) =

Canadian politician (1870–1957)

Hugh McKenzie (January 20, 1870 – 1957) was a politician in Manitoba, Canada. He was a member of the Legislative Assembly of Manitoba from 1927 to 1936.

The son of John McKenzie and Eliza Hogan, McKenzie was educated at Lovant, and served sixteen years as a municipal councillor and reeve in Deloraine, Manitoba. In 1895, he married Elfreda Potter.

He was first elected to the Manitoba legislature in the 1927 provincial election as a Progressive, defeating Conservative candidate A.G. Hainsworth by 160 votes. The Progressives won the election, and McKenzie served as a backbench supporter of John Bracken's government.

In 1932, the Progressives formed an alliance with the provincial Liberal Party. Government members became known as "Liberal-Progressives", and it was under this banner that McKenzie was re-elected in the 1932 campaign. He did not seek re-election in 1936.
