= Isaac Griffiths =

Canadian politician (1882–1970)

Isaac Bertie Griffiths (March 29, 1882 – July 10, 1970) was a politician in Manitoba, Canada. He served in the Legislative Assembly of Manitoba from 1922 to 1941, and was a cabinet minister in the government of John Bracken.

Griffiths was born in Walsall, Staffordshire, England, the son of William Houghton Griffiths and Alice Griffiths. His father was a manufacturer, working in the production of iron and electrical fixtures. The younger Griffiths was educated at South Wales College, and came to Canada in 1903. In 1906, he married Florence Coles.

He worked as a farmer, and served as director of the United Farmers of Manitoba (UFM) in Marquette in 1918-19. When the UFM entered politics in the 1922 provincial election, Griffiths stood as a candidate and was elected for Russell, defeating Liberal incumbent William W.W. Wilson by 396 votes.

After this election, the UFM formed government as the Progressive Party of Manitoba. Griffiths initially served as a government backbencher, and was returned by 291 votes in the 1927 election.

Prior to the 1932 election, the Progressive and Liberal parties formed an alliance to prevent the Conservatives from winning. Government members became known as "Liberal-Progressives" after this time. Griffiths was re-elected with a much increased majority, and was appointed to cabinet on May 28, 1935 as Minister of Health and Public Welfare.

Narrowly returned over an Independent Labour Party candidate in the 1936 provincial election, Griffiths continued to serve in cabinet until the creation of an all-party coalition government in 1940. He resigned from cabinet on November 4, 1940, and did not seek re-election in 1941.

He died in Winnipeg at the age of 88.
