= William McKinnell =

Canadian politician (1873–1939)

- Born: 29 September 1873; Northampton, England
- Died: 27 October 1939 (aged 66); Winnipeg, Canada
- Education: Bedford Modern School

William Clarke McKinnell (September 29, 1873 – October 27, 1939) was a politician in Manitoba, Canada. He served in the Legislative Assembly of Manitoba from 1920 to 1936.

== Life ==
McKinnell was born in Northampton, England, the eldest son of William McKinnell and Catherine Perkins, in a family of 10 children. He was educated at Bedford Modern School from 1887 until 1889. He registered with the Pharmaceutical Society of Great Britain as an apprentice to his father, a Northampton chemist, but abandoned this pursuit to go to Canada in 1892. By 1894 he was homesteading in Melita, Manitoba but later moved to Teulon, Manitoba where he opened the town's first store, McKinnell and Wood General Store. In 1901, McKinnell married Christina Margaret Wood. He served as chair of the school board in Teulon, Manitoba from 1907 to 1921 and was appointed as chair of the Winnipeg Suburban Municipal Board in 1925.

He was first elected to the Manitoba legislature in the 1920 provincial election. Running as a Farmer candidate, he defeated Liberal incumbent Arthur Lobb by a single vote (978 to 977) in the Rockwood constituency. McKinnell served with the Independent-Farmer caucus in the parliament which followed.

He ran for re-election in the 1922 election as a candidate of the United Farmers of Manitoba (UFM), and was easily returned over candidates of the Liberal and Conservative parties. The UFM unexpectedly won a majority of seats in this election, and formed government as the Progressive Party. McKinnell served as a backbench supporter of John Bracken's government.

McKinnell was easily re-elected in the campaigns of 1927 and 1932. He was defeated in the 1936 election, losing to Conservative Mungo Lewis by 383 votes.

After retiring from politics, he worked as a supervisor of municipalities. McKinnell died at home in Winnipeg at the age of 66.
