= Murdoch Mackay =

Canadian politician (1884–1962)

Murdoch Mackay (April 30, 1884 – December 18, 1962) was a Manitoba politician. He led the Manitoba Liberal Party from 1931 to 1932, and brought the party into an alliance with John Bracken's Progressives.

== Biography ==
Mackay was born on Boularderie Island, Nova Scotia, the son of John Mackay and Anna MacAulay. He subsequently moved to Manitoba, and was elected to the provincial legislature in the general election of 1927. A Liberal, Mackay defeated Progressive incumbent Clifford Barclay by 18 votes in the riding of Springfield.

The provincial Liberals fared poorly in this election, winning only seven seats in a 55-member legislature. Party leader Hugh Robson stepped down in 1930. After a brief period in which James Breakey led the parliamentary caucus, Mackay was chosen over Fred C. Hamilton as party leader in 1931.

MacKay brought the Manitoba Liberals into an alliance with the governing Progressives in 1932. By this time, the Liberals and Progressives of Manitoba were already co-operating at the federal level; national Liberal leader William Lyon Mackenzie King wanted the same alliance at the provincial level to prevent a Conservative victory in the next election. The Liberals joined the government in early 1932, and two members of the party were brought into cabinet. Mackay himself was made a Minister without Portfolio on May 27, 1932.

His term in office was brief. The united "Liberal-Progressives" easily defeated the Conservatives in the election, but Mackay was defeated by Barclay (now running as an "Independent Farmer-Labour" candidate) in Springfield. He resigned from cabinet, and left provincial politics. Mackay attempted a comeback in 1945, but lost to CCF candidate George Olive by over one thousand votes.

As well as being a politician, MacKay was known by many as a prominent local physician in the town of Transcona, with a reputation for kindness and a great sense of humour. He graduated from Manitoba Medical School in 1916 and married Ruby Gowland the following year. They had four daughters who all graduated from the University of Manitoba. Throughout his career, MacKay was well known for his compassion - accepting food from patients that could not afford to pay upfront. He remains a community hero and his commitment to the Transcona area was honoured in his 2005 nomination as "The Greatest Transconian".

MacKay died at St. Boniface Hospital on December 18, 1962, and was buried at Transcona Cemetery.

MacKay had a great love of learning and, as such, Murdoch MacKay Collegiate, a high school in Winnipeg, was named in his honour in 1964.
