= John Muirhead =

Canadian politician

John Muirhead (July 11, 1877 – 1954) was a politician in Manitoba, Canada. He served in the Legislative Assembly of Manitoba from 1922 to 1936.

Muirhead was born in Clinton, Ontario and was educated at public schools. He worked as a farmer, and served as a school trustee and municipal assessor. In 1906, Muirhead married Lucy E. Dunfield.

He was first elected to the Manitoba legislature in the 1922 provincial election as a candidate of the United Farmers of Manitoba (UFM), defeating Conservative incumbent Reuben Waugh by 137 votes in the Norfolk constituency. The UFM unexpectedly won a majority of seats in this election, and formed government as the Progressive Party. Muirhead served as a backbench supporter of John Bracken's government throughout his time in the legislature.

He was returned in the 1927 election, defeating Waugh by thirty-four votes in a rematch from the 1922 contest. He defeated Waugh a third time in the 1932 election, by 236 votes.

He was defeated in the 1936 election, losing to Conservative John Lawrie by eighty-two votes. He sought a return to the legislature in the 1941 election, but lost to Lawrie by forty-four votes.
