= Ivan Schultz =

Canadian politician (1891-1974)

Ivan Schultz (November 22, 1891 in Baldur, Manitoba – March 5, 1974) was a politician in Manitoba, Canada. He served in the Legislative Assembly of Manitoba as a Liberal-Progressive from 1930 to 1955, and was a prominent cabinet minister in the governments of John Bracken, Stuart Garson and Douglas Campbell.

The son of Frank Albert Schultz and Margaret MacPhail, Schultz was educated at Wesley College and the University of Manitoba. He was called to the Manitoba Bar in 1920 and worked as a barrister, beginning his own practice at Baldur in 1921. He was a member of the Canadian Institute of International Affairs, and was appointed a King's Counsel.

Schultz served on the Baldur school board and the Baldur town board from 1922 to 1936. He was first elected to the Manitoba legislature in a by-election on January 29, 1930, in the rural constituency of Mountain. The circumstances of Schultz's election were significant for the emerging alliance of Liberals and Progressives in the Manitoba legislature. Schultz, a Liberal, won by acclamation when the Progressives declined to nominate a candidate. The parties created a formal alliance in the legislature two years later, and eventually became known simply as "Liberal-Progressives".

Schultz easily defeated a Conservative opponent in the 1932 election, and a Social Credit opponent in the 1936 election. He was appointed to cabinet on September 21, 1936 as Minister of Education in John Bracken's government.

Returned by acclamation in the 1941 provincial election, Schultz was transferred to the Ministry of Health on February 5, 1944, by Stuart Garson, who had succeeded Bracken as Premier of Manitoba one year earlier. Schultz easily defeated a candidate of the Cooperative Commonwealth Federation in the 1945 election, and was returned by acclamation again in 1949.

After another cabinet shuffle on November 7, 1952, Schultz was named as Attorney General of Manitoba. He was easily re-elected in the 1953 election, and stepped down from cabinet and the legislature on January 22, 1955 when he was appointed as a judge in the Court of Queen's Bench of Manitoba.

Schultz was one of the most important figures in the legislature during the 1940s and 1950s. Like most others in the Liberal-Progressive Party, he was essentially conservative in his political views and reluctant to legislate progressive changes. He opposed increases in Mothers' Allowances in the 1940s, and opposed penal reform even prior to his appointment as Attorney General.
