= Robert Mooney =

Canadian politician (1873–1953)

Robert Henry Mooney (August 10, 1873 – January 30, 1953) was a politician in Manitoba, Canada. He served in the Legislative Assembly of Manitoba from 1922 to 1953.

== Early life ==
Mooney was born on August 10, 1873, in Wingham, Ontario, the son of Alexander Mooney and Susan Orr. He was educated in Virden, Manitoba. Upon the conclusion of his education, he worked as a farmer. He also worked as an educator for three years, and was a councillor in the Rural Municipality of Pipestone from 1911 to 1922.

== Term in the Legislative Assembly of Manitoba ==
He was first elected to the Manitoba assembly in the 1922 provincial election for the constituency of Virden. Running as a candidate of the United Farmers of Manitoba, he defeated Liberal incumbent George Clingan by 677 votes. The United Farmers of Manitoba won the election, and governed as the "Progressive Party"; Mooney was returned by acclamation under this label in the 1927 election.

The Progressives and Liberals merged prior to the 1932 provincial election. Again running as a candidate of the governing coalition, Mooney defeated Conservative candidate G.H. Heenan by 432 votes in this election. In the 1936 election, he defeated Conservative O.S. Ross by 205 votes.

Mooney was returned by acclamation in the 1941 and 1949 elections, and defeated a candidate of the CCF in 1945. He served as a government backbencher throughout his entire career in the legislature.

== Late life and death ==
Mooney died on January 30, 1953. In its obituary notice, the Winnipeg Free Press described him as "one of the quietest men in the house".
