= Thomas Wolstenholme =

Canadian politician

Thomas Wolstenholme (April 6, 1870—November 16, 1952) was a politician in Manitoba, Canada. He served in the Legislative Assembly of Manitoba from 1922 to 1936.

Wolstenholme was the 3rd child of Henry Wolstenholme (Born 1841) and Mary Leech (Born 1845). He had two older siblings, Henry & Emma. He also had a younger brother Alfred. His father was originally a Lithograph Machine Printer but later started a drapers at his residence 442 Oldham Road, where Thomas and his siblings helped in his business.

Wolstenholme was born and educated in Manchester, England, and came to Canada in 1889. Shortly after he moved to Canada, his father transmitted his business to his sister-in-law and Thomas's maternal aunt, who used to be Henry's assistant before he began a drapers, and her husband. Their family also helped at the drapers, her son being a commercial traveller as some of their other family members working there. He was a director and shareholder of the Moline Cooperative Society, and served as reeve of the Rural Municipality of Saskatchewan in Manitoba from 1918 to 1922.

He first campaigned for the Manitoba legislature in the 1922 provincial election, as a candidate of the United Farmers of Manitoba (UFM) in Hamiota. He was successful, defeating Liberal incumbent John Henry McConnell by 403 votes. The UFM unexpectedly won a majority of seats, and formed government as the Progressive Party. Wolstenholme served in the legislature as a backbench supporter of John Bracken's administration. He was re-elected without difficulty in the elections of 1927 and 1932. He did not seek re-election in 1936.

Before the 1932 election, the governing Progressives formed an electoral alliance with the Manitoba Liberal Party. Government members, including Wolstenholme, were known as "Liberal-Progressives" after this time.

Wolstenholme was struck by a motorist on November 14, 1952, and died of his injuries at the Minnedosa General Hospital two days later. His death was ruled an accident.

Wolstenholme's children include

- Mary Elfred Wolstenholme (Born 1898)
- Margery Edna Wolstenholme (Born 1899)
- Harry Samuel Wolstenholme (Born 1902)
- Thomas Joseph Leech Wolstenholme (Born 1905)
- Norman Alfred Wolstenholme (Born 1907)
- Allan Elgin Garth Wolstenholme (Born 1910)
- Gilbert Moore Wolstenholme (Born 1913)
- Lola Margaret Wolstenholme (Born 1918)
