= Donald Gordon McKenzie =

Canadian politician

Donald Gordon McKenzie (April 9, 1887 – May 14, 1963) was a politician in Manitoba, Canada. He served in the Legislative Assembly of Manitoba from 1928 to 1936 and was a cabinet minister in the government of John Bracken.

McKenzie was born in Brandon, Manitoba, to parents who were recent settlers from Huron County, Ontario. His father, Roderick McKenzie, was a founder and for years a prominent member of the farmers' movement in Western Canada.

The younger McKenzie was educated at Brandon Collegiate and Manitoba Agricultural College, and himself worked as a farmer. He married Katie Belle Cole in 1914. He was a member of United Grain Growers Ltd. of Winnipeg, and secretary-treasurer of the local United Farmers of Manitoba division from 1922 to 1926. From April 1926 to October 1928, he served as part of an advisory board on Tariff and Taxation.

Although he had no prior experience in electoral politics, McKenzie was appointed to John Bracken's government on October 22, 1928 as Minister of Mines and Natural Resources. On November 10, 1928, he was elected to the Manitoba legislature in a by-election in the constituency of Lansdowne, replacing former premier Tobias Norris. McKenzie ran as a "Liberal-Progressive", and was endorsed by both Bracken's Progressives and the local branch of the Manitoba Liberal Party.

McKenzie also served as Provincial Secretary from October 22, 1928 to December 31, 1929, and as acting Minister of Public Works from March 22 to May 18, 1929.

The Liberals and Progressives formed an electoral alliance in 1932, and all government members became known as "Liberal-Progressives". McKenzie was easily re-elected in Lansdowne, and appointed Minister of Agriculture and Power Commissioner after a cabinet shuffle on May 27, 1932.

He left politics in 1936, and was named vice-president and director of United Grain Growers, Ltd. He was named Chief Commissioner of the Board of Grain Commissioners for Canada in 1942, and served in this capacity until his retirement in 1956.

He died at home in Winnipeg in 1963.
