= Birtle (electoral district) =

Defunct provincial electoral district in Manitoba, Canada

Birtle is a former provincial electoral district in Manitoba, Canada.

Birtle was established in 1881, following the western expansion of the province's boundaries. It was located in the central western region of the province, near Roblin and Russell. It was eliminated for the 1886 provincial election, but re-established for the 1888 election.

For most of its history, Birtle was safe for the Liberal and Liberal-Progressive parties. The constituency was abolished with the 1958 election, with much of its territory going to the new constituency of Birtle-Russell.

== Members of the Legislative Assembly ==
Provincial representatives
Name	Party	Took office	Left office	Ref
Stephen Clement	Liberal	1881	1882	
Edward Leacock	Conservative	1882	1886	
Charles Mickle	Liberal	1888	1909	
George Malcolm	Liberal	1909	1922	
William J. Short	Progressive	1922	1927	
John Pratt	Progressive	1927	1928	
John Pratt	Progressive-Independent	1928	1936	
Francis Bell	Liberal–Progressive	1936	1958	

== See also ==
- List of Manitoba provincial electoral districts
- Canadian provincial electoral districts
