= Hugh Robson (politician) =

Canadian politician (1871–1945)

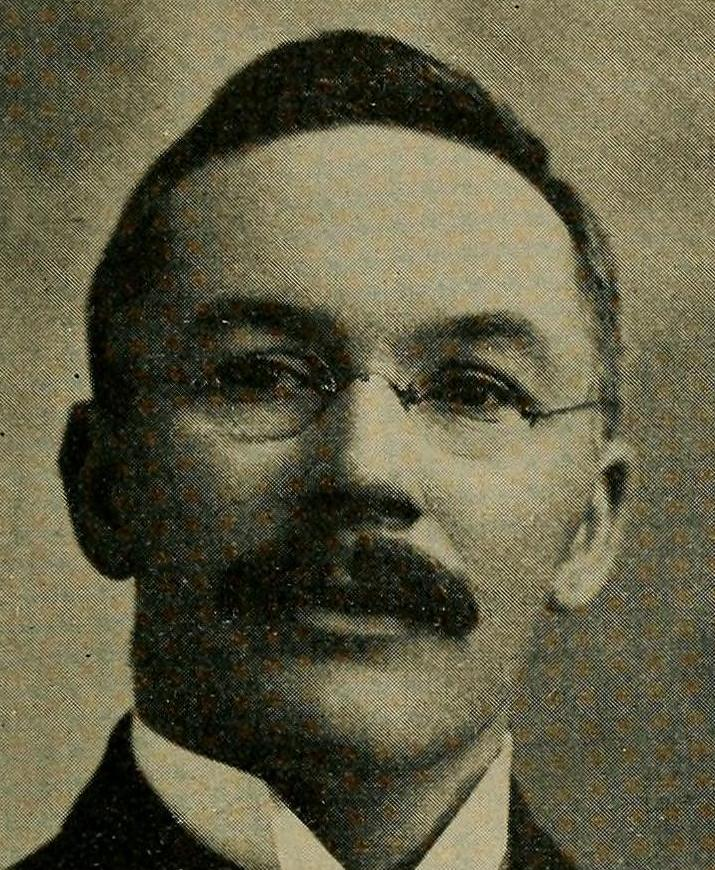

Judge of the Manitoba Court of Appeal
- In office 1930–1944

Member of the Legislative Assembly of Manitoba
- In office 1927–1930

Personal details
- Born: September 9, 1871 Barrow-in-Furness, England
- Died: July 9, 1945 (aged 73) Winnipeg, Manitoba, Canada

Hugh Amos Robson (September 9, 1871 – July 9, 1945) was a politician and judge in Manitoba. He briefly served as leader of the Manitoba Liberal Party in the 1920s.

== Career ==
Hugh Amos Robson was born in Barrow-in-Furness, England, on September 9, 1871. The son of Robert Robson, he came to Canada with his family in 1882, studied law in Regina, was called to the bar for the Northwest Territories in 1892 and practised in the Northwest Territories, moving to Winnipeg in 1899. Robson married Fannie Laidlaw in 1897. He was named to the Court of King's Bench on June 23, 1910, and then served as head of the Manitoba public utilities commission from 1911 to 1914.

The Manitoba Liberals were in government between 1915 and 1922, but lost much of their support to the United Farmers of Manitoba (later called the Progressives) in the early 1920s. Despite Premier Tobias Norris's personal popularity, the Liberals were reduced to only eight seats in the province's 55-member legislature following the election of 1922.

Norris remained party leader until 1927, but stepped down shortly before that year's election. He was replaced by Robson, who seems to have been chosen because of his status as a "respected outsider", and because he was regarded (incorrectly) as favouring cooperation with the Progressives. He had no experience as a provincial politician, but was a leading figure in the province's legal system.

Robson was elected a member of the Legislative Assembly of Manitoba on June 28, 1927, during the 1927 Manitoba general election. He led the Liberal ticket in Winnipeg, and placed second on the city's multi-member ballot (Winnipeg elections were determined by a form of proportional representation at the time). He was only able to elect one other Liberal in the city, however, and his party won only seven seats throughout the province. Robson left the Legislative Assembly in January 1930, becoming a judge of the Manitoba Court of Appeal that month. He served on the court until March 1944, later becoming a chief justice of Manitoba.

Robson died on July 9, 1945, at the Winnipeg General Hospital, aged 73.

Robson Hall at the University of Manitoba is named in his honour.

== Sources ==
- Penner, Roland (2019). "Hugh Amos Robson: Lawyer, Judge, Founder of the Manitoba Law School, Politician, Popular Public Servant". Manitoba Law Journal. 42 (2): 1–45. 2019 CanLIIDocs 4179.
- "Hugh Amos Robson (1871-1945)". Manitoba Historical Society.
