= Mountain (electoral district) =

Defunct provincial electoral district in Manitoba, Canada

Mountain is a former provincial electoral district in Manitoba, Canada. It was created for the 1879 provincial election, and was abolished shortly before the 1958 election.

Mountain was located in southwestern Manitoba, near Portage la Prairie. The constituency was mostly rural, and included communities such as Baldur and Argyles. Premier Dufferin Roblin once referred to the division's name as "curious", given that it marked by "the gentle landscape of the Pembina escarpment".

Several prominent Manitoba politicians represented Mountain, including Charles Cannon, Ivan Schultz and Premier Thomas Greenway. The constituency was shaped like an "L" in the nineteenth century, and was sometimes called "Greenway's armchair". For most of its history, Mountain was considered safe for the Manitoba Liberal Party and its successor, the Liberal-Progressive Party. But an effort was made to put forward an Independent third-party candidate in 1914.

In 1955, Mountain's population was estimated to be about 50% Anglo-Saxon, 33% French Canadian, and 16.5% Flemish.

== Members of the Legislative Assembly ==
Name	Party	Took office	Left office
Thomas Greenway	Independent Conservative	1879	1882
Thomas Greenway	Liberal	1882	1904
Daniel A. McIntyre	Conservative	1905	1907
James Bryson Baird	Liberal	1907	1922
Charles Cannon	Progressive	1922	1927
Irving Cleghorn	Liberal	1927	1930
Ivan Schultz	Liberal	1930	1932
Ivan Schultz	Liberal–Progressive	1932	1955
Walter Clark	Liberal–Progressive	1955	1958

== See also ==
- List of Manitoba provincial electoral districts
- Canadian provincial electoral districts
