= Fawcett Taylor =

Canadian politician (1878–1940)

Fawcett Gowler Taylor, KC (April 29, 1878 – January 1, 1940,) was a Manitoba politician, and was the leader of that province's Conservative Party from 1922 to 1933.

Taylor was born in Meadow Lea, Manitoba, the son of William Taylor and Marietta Jane Plummer, and was educated in Winnipeg. He was called to the Manitoba bar in 1900 and worked as a barrister. He served as mayor of Portage la Prairie from 1912 to 1915. Taylor married Mabel Agnes Dykeman in 1901. He was named King's Counsel in 1913. In the provincial election of 1915, he ran as a Conservative candidate in the Portage la Prairie constituency and was defeated.

Taylor resigned as mayor later in 1915 to enlist for service in the First World War. Already a captain in the 99th Manitoba Rangers, he was quickly promoted to major and served in France with the 1st Canadian Mounted Rifles from 1916 to 1918. On returning, he became president of the Army and Navy Veterans in Canada (Dominion Association).

Taylor sought the leadership of provincial Conservatives in 1919, but was defeated by Richard G. Willis. He was elected for Portage la Prairie in the provincial election of 1920, and was chosen as party leader in a second attempt on April 5, 1922, defeating John Thomas Haig.

The Manitoba Conservatives had governed the province from 1900 to 1915, but were in a weak position when Taylor became the party's leader. The scandals of the Roblin government had led to a catastrophic defeat in 1915, with the Conservatives winning only won five of 47 seats. They increased their total to seven in 1920, but were in danger of becoming marginalized by the rise of the United Farmers of Manitoba and Labour.

Taylor's first campaign as party leader was not particularly successful. The UFM swept the countryside in the 1922 campaign, with Labour and the Liberals dominating Winnipeg. Taylor faced a strong challenge from Liberal cabinet minister Charles Duncan McPherson in Portage la Prairie, winning by only 131 votes out of 2743 cast.

Subsequently, Taylor brought the party back to a more viable position. By now a lieutenant colonel, Taylor brought the Conservatives back to 15 seats and official opposition status in the election of 1927. Leading up to the 1932 election, his party was regarded as having a real chance to form government.

This did not occur, however. The federal Liberals were concerned about a Conservative victory in the province, and convinced their provincial affiliate to form an alliance with the governing Progressives (as the UFM government had renamed itself). The combined resources of these parties weakened the Conservative position. Taylor was also damaged by the unpopularity of Conservative Prime Minister Richard Bennett. Taylor's own plan to redistribute land to the poor was criticized by many as ineffective.

The Conservatives won only 10 seats in the 1932 election. Taylor resigned the party leadership in April 1933, after being appointed a judge in the Manitoba Court of King's Bench. He was succeeded in the Portage la Prairie riding by Toby Sexsmith.

He died at home in Winnipeg and was buried in Portage la Prairie.
