= Hamiota (electoral district) =

Defunct provincial electoral district in Manitoba, Canada

Hamiota is a former provincial electoral district in Manitoba, Canada. It was created by redistribution in 1903, and eliminated with the 1969 provincial election.

The constituency was located in the province's southwestern corner, and included the rural municipality of Hamiota. Both the town and the electoral division were named after Thomas Hamilton, an early explorer.

== Members of the Legislative Assembly ==
Name	Party	Took office	Left office
David Jackson	Liberal	1903	1907
William Ferguson	Conservative	1907	1914
John Henry McConnell	Liberal	1914	1922
Thomas Wolstenholme	Progressive	1922	1936
Norman Turnbull	Social Credit	1936	1940
Norman Turnbull	Social Credit (Coalition)	1940	1949
Charles Shuttleworth	Liberal–Progressive	1949	1958
Barry Strickland	Progressive Conservative	1958	1966
Earl Dawson	Liberal	1966	1969

== See also ==
- List of Manitoba provincial electoral districts
- Canadian provincial electoral districts
