= Virden (electoral district) =

Defunct provincial electoral district in Manitoba, Canada

Virden is a former provincial electoral district in Manitoba, Canada. It was created by redistribution in 1903, and was eliminated in 1989, when its territory was combined with Arthur to create Arthur-Virden.

Virden was located in southwestern Manitoba, along the border with Saskatchewan to its west, and bordered to the south by the Arthur constituency.

== Members of the Legislative Assembly ==
Name	Party	Took office	Left office
James Simpson	Cons	1899	1903
John Agnew	Cons	1903	1908
Harvey Simpson	Cons	1909	1914
George Clingan	Lib	1914	1922
Robert Mooney	Prog	1922	1932
	Lib-Prog	1932	1953
John Thompson	PC	1953	1962
Donald McGregor	PC	1962	1981
Harry Graham	PC	1981	1986
Glen Findlay	PC	1986	1990

== See also ==
- List of Manitoba provincial electoral districts
- Canadian provincial electoral districts
