= Cypress (former Manitoba provincial electoral district) =

Defunct provincial electoral district in Manitoba, Canada

Cypress is a former provincial electoral district in Manitoba, Canada. It was located in the south of the province.

Cypress was created for the 1886 provincial election, and abolished with the 1969 election.

== Members of the Legislative Assembly ==
Name	Party	Took office	Left office
R.S. Thompson	Liberal	1886	1888
Ernest Wood	Liberal-Conservative	1888	1892
Alfred Doig	Liberal	1892	1899
George Steel	Liberal-Conservative	1888	1907
George Steel	Conservative	1907	1915
Andrew Myles	Liberal	1915	1920
William Spinks	Conservative	1920	1932
James Christie	Liberal–Progressive	1932	1953
Francis Ferg	Liberal–Progressive	1953	1958
Marcel Boulic	Progressive Conservative	1958	1959
Thelma Forbes	Progressive Conservative	1959	1969

== Election results ==
1958 Manitoba general election
Party	Candidate	Votes	%	±%
Progressive Conservative	Marcel Boulic	2,347	52.12	
Liberal–Progressive	Samuel Burch	1,835	40.75	
Co-operative Commonwealth	G.H. McIntosh	321	7.13	
Total valid votes		4,503		
Rejected votes		19		
Turnout		4,522	68.13	
Electors on the lists		6,637		

1959 Manitoba general election
Party	Candidate	Votes	%	±%
Progressive Conservative	Marcel Boulic	2,951	62.36	+10.24
Liberal–Progressive	John Leslie Sundell	1,781	37.64	−3.11
Total valid votes		4,732		
Rejected votes		27		
Turnout		4,759	72.77	+4.64
Electors on the lists		6,540		

== See also ==
- List of Manitoba provincial electoral districts
- Canadian provincial electoral districts
