= Morden and Rhineland =

Defunct provincial electoral district in Manitoba, Canada

Morden and Rhineland is a former provincial electoral district of Manitoba, Canada, which was represented in the Legislative Assembly of Manitoba from 1914 to 1949. The district was created by merging the former districts of Morden and Rhineland, and was located in the southernmost portion of the province encompassing communities such as Morden, Winkler and Altona. Due to its location, the political culture of the riding was very strongly dominated by Mennonites.

After 1949, the district was split between the reconstituted district of Rhineland and the new district of Manitou–Morden.

== Members of the Legislative Assembly ==
Name	Party	Took office	Left office
Valentine Winkler	Liberal	1914	1920
John Kennedy	Conservative	1920	1927
Hugh McGavin	Conservative	1927	1932
Cornelius Wiebe	Liberal-Progressive	1932	1936
Wallace Miller	Conservative	1936	1949

== See also ==
- List of Manitoba provincial electoral districts
- Canadian provincial electoral districts
