= Brandon City (electoral district) =

Defunct provincial electoral district in Manitoba, Canada

Brandon City is a former provincial electoral district in Manitoba, Canada.

It was initially created as Brandon in 1881, following the westward expansion of Manitoba's boundaries. It was eliminated through redistribution before the 1886 provincial election, and replaced with Brandon East and Brandon West. The area was further redistributed prior to the 1888 election, and Brandon City was created along with North Brandon and South Brandon.

In 1892, William Alexander Macdonald was elected for Brandon City, defeating incumbent Liberal James Smart by 12 votes.

The constituency was renamed Brandon for the 1958 provincial election. It disappeared from the electoral map with the 1969 provincial election, when the city was once again divided into Brandon East and Brandon West.

== Members of the Legislative Assembly for Brandon ==
Name	Party	Took office	Left office
John W. Sifton	Liberal	1881	1883
Joseph Woodworth	Conservative	1883	1886

== Members of the Legislative Assembly for Brandon City ==
Name	Party	Took office	Left office
James Smart	Liberal	1888	1892
William Alexander Macdonald	Conservative	1892	1893
Charles Adams	Liberal	1893	1899
Stanley McInnis	Conservative	1899	1907
George Coldwell	Conservative	1907	1915
Stephen Clement	Liberal	1915	1920
Albert Edward Smith	Dominion Labour	1920	1922
John Edmison	Independent	1922	1932
George Dinsdale	Conservative	1932	1943
Dwight Johnson	Cooperative Commonwealth Federation	1943	1945
	Independent Cooperative Commonwealth Federation	1945	1945
Leslie McDorman	Liberal–Progressive	1945	1949
Joseph Donaldson	Progressive Conservative	1949	1951
Reginald Lissaman	Progressive Conservative	1952	1958

== Members of the Legislative Assembly for Brandon (re-established) ==
Name	Party	Took office	Left office
Reginald Lissaman	Progressive Conservative	1958	1969

== See also ==
- List of Manitoba provincial electoral districts
- Canadian provincial electoral districts
