= John Thomas Haig =

Canadian politician (1877-1962)

Hon. John Thomas Haig, PC

John Thomas Haig, PC QC (December 15, 1877 – October 23, 1962) was a politician in Manitoba, Canada. He served as parliamentary leader of the Manitoba Conservative Party in 1921–22.

Born in Colborne, Ontario, Haig received his BA from the University of Manitoba, was called to the Manitoba bar in 1904 and worked as a Barrister-at-law. In 1907, he married Josephine M. Dickie. He was elected to the Winnipeg Public School Board in 1908, and continued to hold this position after entering provincial politics, also serving as board chairman. In 1927, Haig was named King's Counsel. He was president of the Manitoba Curling Association from 1912 to 1913 and was the first president of the Dominion Curling Association (now Curling Canada).

Haig was first elected to the Legislative Assembly of Manitoba for Assiniboia in 1914. He was soundly defeated in the Liberal landslide of 1915, but returned to the legislature in 1920 at the head of the Conservative Party list in Winnipeg. (Winnipeg elections were determined by a form of proportional representation at this time.)

Conservative leader R.G. Willis was unable to win a seat in the 1920 election, and Haig was called to lead the eight-member caucus in parliament. He ran for the party's leadership in April 1922, but was defeated by Major Fawcett Taylor.

Haig was re-elected to the legislature in 1922, 1927 and 1932, and remained an important voice for the party.

In August 1935, he was appointed to the Senate of Canada on the recommendation of Prime Minister R.B. Bennett. From 1945 until 1957, Haig was Leader of the Opposition in the Senate for the Progressive Conservative Party. After the 1957 federal election, Haig joined the Cabinet of John Diefenbaker, serving as Minister without portfolio and Leader of the Government in the Senate until May 11, 1958.

He retired from the Senate on January 17, 1962 due to poor health.

Haig died in Winnipeg at the age of 84.

His son James Campbell Haig also served in the Senate.

Government offices
Preceded by Charles Ballantyne	Leader of the Opposition in the Senate of Canada; 1945–1957	Succeeded by William Ross Macdonald
