= Roblin (electoral district) =

Provincial electoral district in Manitoba, Canada

Manitoba electoral district
- Location in Winnipeg

Provincial electoral district
- Legislature: Legislative Assembly of Manitoba
MLA
Kathleen Cook
Progressive Conservative
- District created: 2018
- First contested: 2019
- Last contested: 2023

Demographics
- Population (2021): 25,070

Roblin is a provincial electoral district in Manitoba, Canada. Its current incarnation has existed since the 2019 Manitoba general election in Winnipeg's far west end (not to be confused with the old West End of downtown Winnipeg) and Headingley.

A previous Manitoba provincial riding also named "Roblin" existed from 1914 to 1981 and was located in Western Manitoba.

Following the 2018 redistribution, the current riding of Roblin was created in Winnipeg, replacing Charleswood and containing a part of Morris as well. The riding became effective as of the 2019 Manitoba general election.

The riding includes Headingley and the Winnipeg communities of Westdale, Charleswood, and Lakewood.

== Members of the Legislative Assembly ==
Name	Party	Took office	Left office
Myrna Driedger	Progressive Conservative	2019	2023
Kathleen Cook	Progressive Conservative	2023	

== Election results ==
2023 Manitoba general election
Party	Candidate	Votes	%	±%	Expenditures
Progressive Conservative	Kathleen Cook	6,088	49.72	-5.47	$18,280.04
New Democratic	Madelaine Dwyer	4,968	40.57	+22.57	$2,103.86
Liberal	Detlev Regelsky	1,189	9.71	-6.08	$0.00
Total valid votes/expense limit		12,245	99.39	–	$76,775.00
Total rejected and declined ballots		75	0.61	–	
Turnout		12,320	62.54	+0.71	
Eligible voters		19,699			
Progressive Conservative hold		Swing		-14.02	
Source(s) Source: Elections Manitoba

2019 Manitoba general election
Party	Candidate	Votes	%	±%	Expenditures
Progressive Conservative	Myrna Driedger	6,203	55.19	-7.1	$24,038.60
New Democratic	Sophie Brandt-Murenzi	2,023	18.00	+4.7	$150.00
Liberal	Michael Bazak	1,775	15.79	+2.4	$1,931.39
Green	Kevin Nichols	1,238	11.02	+0.0	$0.00
Total valid votes		11,239	99.56		
Total rejected ballots		50	0.44		
Turnout		11,289	61.83		
Eligible voters		18,257			
Progressive Conservative hold		Swing		-5.9	

2016 provincial election redistributed results
Party	%
Progressive Conservative	62.3
Liberal	13.4
New Democratic	13.3
Green	11.0

== See also ==
- List of Manitoba provincial electoral districts
- Canadian provincial electoral districts
