= List of Manitoba provincial electoral districts =

Provincial electoral divisions (also known as constituencies or ridings) in Manitoba are currently single-member ridings that each elect one member to the Legislative Assembly of Manitoba. The individual who is elected thereby becomes a Member of the Legislative Assembly (MLA).

Electoral boundaries are reviewed every 10 years by the Manitoba Electoral Divisions Boundaries Commission. The current provincial electoral boundaries were established in December 2018 and went into effect for the 42nd general election, held on September 10, 2019.

Manitoba today has 57 electoral divisions.

== Electoral Divisions Boundaries Commission ==
Manitoba's provincial electoral boundaries are reviewed every 10 years by the Manitoba Electoral Divisions Boundaries Commission.

The commission was established on March 31, 1955, with The Electoral Divisions Act, which sets out the composition of the commission. There were three original Commission members: Manitoba's Chief Justice, the President of the University of Manitoba, and the Chief Electoral Officer of Manitoba.

The 2018 Commission was made up of five members:

- Richard J. F. Chartier — Chief Justice of Manitoba
- David Barnard — University of Manitoba President and Vice-Chancellor
- Steven Robinson — Brandon University interim President and Vice-Chancellor
- Harvey Briggs — University College of the North Dean, Faculty of Arts, Business and Science
- Shipra Verma — Chief Electoral Officer of Manitoba

== 2018 divisions ==
=== Northern Manitoba ===
The 2018 provincial electoral districts in Northern Manitoba:

- Flin Flon
- Keewatinook
- The Pas-Kameesak
- Thompson

=== Southeastern Manitoba ===
The 2018 provincial electoral districts in the southeastern Manitoba:

- Borderland
- Dawson Trail
- Interlake-Gimli
- La Verendrye
- Lac du Bonnet
- Lakeside
- Midland
- Morden-Winkler
- Red River North
- Selkirk
- Springfield-Ritchot
- Steinbach

=== Southwestern Manitoba ===
The 2018 provincial electoral districts in the southwestern Manitoba:

- Agassiz
- Brandon East
- Brandon West
- Dauphin
- Portage la Prairie
- Riding Mountain
- Spruce Woods
- Swan River
- Turtle Mountain

=== Winnipeg Metro Region ===
The 2018 provincial electoral districts in Winnipeg and the immediate area:

- Assiniboia
- Burrows
- Concordia
- Elmwood
- Fort Garry
- Fort Richmond
- Fort Rouge
- Fort Whyte
- Kildonan-River East
- Kirkfield Park
- Lagimodière
- Maples, The
- McPhillips — includes RM of West St. Paul
- Notre Dame
- Point Douglas
- Radisson
- Riel
- River Heights
- Roblin — includes RM of Headingley
- Rossmere
- Seine River
- Southdale
- St. Boniface
- St. James
- St. Johns
- St. Vital
- Transcona
- Tuxedo
- Tyndall Park
- Union Station
- Waverley
- Wolseley

== Former districts ==
- Arthur
- Arthur-Virden
- Birtle
- Birtle-Russell
- Brandon City
- Broadway
- Carillon
- Carman
- Cartier
- Charleswood
- Churchill
- Crescentwood
- Cypress
- Deloraine—Glenwood
- Dufferin
- Ellice
- Emerson
- Ethelbert
- Fairford
- Fisher
- Fort Garry-Riverview
- Gilbert Plains
- Gimli
- Gladstone
- Hamiota
- Iberville
- Inkster
- Interlake
- Kildonan
- Kildonan—Transcona
- Killarney
- Lansdowne
- Logan
- Lord Roberts
- Manitou–Morden
- Minnedosa
- Minto
- Morden
- Morden and Rhineland
- Morris
- Mountain
- Niakwa
- Norfolk—Beautiful Plains
- Osborne
- The Pas
- Pembina
- Rhineland
- River East
- Roblin-Russell
- Rock Lake
- Rockwood
- Rosenfeld
- Russell
- Seven Oaks
- Springfield
- St. Andrews
- St. Clements
- St. George
- St. Norbert
- St. Paul
- Ste. Rose
- Sturgeon Creek
- Virden
- Wellington
- Winnipeg
- Winnipeg Centre
- Winnipeg North
- Winnipeg South
- Winnipeg West

== See also ==
- Canadian provincial electoral districts
- List of Manitoba general elections
- List of Manitoba by-elections
- Elections Manitoba
- List of Canadian federal electoral districts in Manitoba
