= Progressive Party of Manitoba =

- Former provincial party
- Leader: John Bracken
- Founded: c. 1920
- Dissolved: 1932
- Merged into: Manitoba Liberal Party
- Ideology: Progressivism; Agrarianism

The Progressive Party of Manitoba, Canada, was a political party in Manitoba between 1920 and 1932, which was the year of its dissolution. It developed from the United Farmers of Manitoba (UFM), an agrarian movement that became politically active following World War I.

== Electoral record ==
Election	Leader	Seats	Seat Change	Place	Popular Vote	%	Role	Notes
1922	none	28 / 55	▲18	▲1st	49,767	32.8%	Majority	Seat change from United Farmers Party
1927	John Bracken	29 / 55	▲1	1st	52,805	32.4%	Majority	

== See also ==
- List of political parties in Canada
- Progressive Party of Canada
