= David Henry McFadden =

Canadian politician (1856–1935)

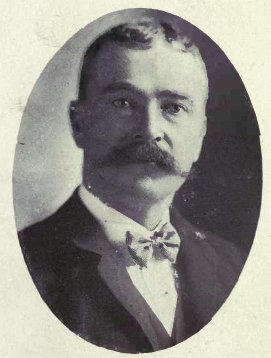

Member of Legislative Assembly of Manitoba for Emerson
- In office 1892–1907
- Preceded by: James Thomson
- Succeeded by: George Walton
- In office 1910–1915
- Preceded by: George Walton
- Succeeded by: John David Baskerville

Personal details
- Born: February 17, 1856 Peterborough, Canada West
- Died: February 21, 1935 (aged 79) Emerson, Manitoba, Canada
- Party: Conservative
- Cabinet: Minister of Public Works (1900); Provincial Secretary (1900-1907); Municipal Commissioner (1900-1907)

David Henry McFadden (February 17, 1856 – February 21, 1935) was a politician in Manitoba, Canada. He served in the Legislative Assembly of Manitoba from 1892 to 1907, and again from 1910 to 1915. McFadden was a Conservative, and served as a cabinet minister in the governments of Hugh John Macdonald and Rodmond Roblin.

McFadden was born in Peterborough, Canada West (now Ontario), and educated in Bruce, Ontario. He received certification from the Ontario Veterinary College and practised as a veterinary surgeon. He also served as manager of the Alexandra Realty Co. in Emerson, Manitoba, and was active in municipal politics. In religion, McFadden was a Methodist.

He was first elected to the Manitoba legislature in the 1892 provincial election, defeating Liberal incumbent James Thomson by fourteen votes in the Emerson constituency. The Liberals won a majority government in this election, and McFadden served as an opposition member. He was one of only six Conservatives returned in the 1896 election, defeating candidates of the Liberals and the Patrons of Industry.

McFadden was returned again for Emerson by an increased majority in the 1899 election. At the provincial level, the Conservatives won a majority government under the leadership of Hugh John Macdonald. The Conservative Party assumed office on January 10, 1900, and McFadden was appointed as Minister of Public Works and Provincial Secretary. When Rodmond Roblin replaced Macdonald as premier on December 20, 1900, he reassigned McFadden as Municipal Commissioner and Provincial Secretary.

He was re-elected over Liberal George Walton in the 1903 election, and might have lost had the opposition vote not been split with a Prohibitionist candidate. In the 1907 election, Walton defeated McFadden by 105 votes. He resigned from cabinet on June 26, 1907.

McFadden returned to the legislature in the 1910 election, defeating Walton by a margin of nine votes in Emerson. He was not re-appointed to cabinet and served as a backbench supporter of Roblin's administration. In the 1914 election, McFadden defeated Walton by thirty-two votes.

In 1915, the Roblin administration was forced to resign from office after a report commissioned by the Lieutenant Governor found the government guilty of corruption in the tendering of contracts for new legislative buildings. A new election was called, in which the Liberal government won a landslide majority. McFadden did not seek re-election.

He attempted to return to the legislature in the 1922 election, but lost to independent candidate Dmytro Yakimischak.
