= 38th Manitoba Legislature =

- Majority parliament

Parliament leaders
- Premier: Gary Doer; May 2, 2003 — April 20, 2007
- Leader of the Opposition: Stuart Murray
- Hugh McFadyen

Party caucuses
- Government: New Democrat
- Opposition: Progressive Conservative
- Unrecognized: Liberal

Legislative Assembly
- Speaker of the Assembly: George Hickes
- Members: 57 MLA seats

Sovereign
- Monarch: Elizabeth II; 6 Feb. 1952 – 8 Sept. 2022
- Lieutenant Governor: Hon. Peter Liba; March 2, 1999 – June 30, 2004
- Hon. John Harvard; June 30, 2004 – August 4, 2009

Sessions
- 1st session June 23, 2003 – October 1, 2003
- 2nd session November 20, 2003 – June 10, 2004
- 3rd session November 22, 2004 – June 16, 2005
- 4th session October 27, 2005 – June 13, 2006
- 5th session November 15, 2006 – April 19, 2007
← 37th	→ 39th

The members of the 38th Manitoba Legislature were elected in the Manitoba general election held in June 2003. The legislature sat from June 23, 2003, to April 20, 2007.

The New Democratic Party led by Gary Doer formed the government.

Stuart Murray of the Progressive Conservative Party was Leader of the Opposition. Hugh McFadyen was elected party leader in 2006 after Murray resigned in November 2005.

George Hickes served as speaker for the assembly.

There were five sessions of the 38th Legislature:

Peter Liba was Lieutenant Governor of Manitoba until June 30, 2004, when John Harvard became lieutenant governor.

== Members of the Assembly ==
The following members were elected to the assembly in 2003:

Member	Electoral district	Party	First elected / previously elected	No.# of term(s)	Notes
Larry Maguire	Arthur-Virden	Progressive Conservative	1999	2nd term	
Jim Rondeau	Assiniboia	NDP	1999	2nd term	
Drew Caldwell	Brandon East	NDP	1999	2nd term	
Scott Smith	Brandon West	NDP	1999	2nd term	
Doug Martindale	Burrows	NDP	1990	4th term	
Denis Rocan	Carman	Progressive Conservative	1986	6th term	
Denis Rocan	Carman	Independent	1986	6th term	
Myrna Driedger	Charleswood	Progressive Conservative	1998	3rd term	
Gary Doer	Concordia	NDP	1986	6th term	
Stan Struthers	Dauphin—Roblin	NDP	1995	3rd term	
Jim Maloway	Elmwood	NDP	1986	6th term	
Jack Penner	Emerson	Progressive Conservative	1988	5th term	
Gerard Jennissen	Flin Flon	NDP	1995	3rd term	
Kerri Irvin-Ross	Fort Garry	NDP	2003	1st term	
Tim Sale	Fort Rouge	NDP	1995	3rd term	
John Loewen	Fort Whyte	Progressive Conservative	1999	2nd term	Until September 26, 2005
Hugh McFadden (2005)	Fort Whyte	Progressive Conservative	2005	1st term	From December 13, 2005
Peter Bjornson	Gimli	NDP	2003	1st term	
Kevin Lamoureux	Inkster	Liberal	1988, 2003	4th term*	
Tom Nevakshonoff	Interlake	NDP	1999	2nd term	
Dave Chomiak	Kildonan	NDP	1990	4th term	
Stuart Murray	Kirkfield Park	Progressive Conservative	2000	2nd term	
Gerald Hawranik	Lac du Bonnet	Progressive Conservative	2002	2nd term	
Ralph Eichler	Lakeside	Progressive Conservative	2003	1st term	
Ron Lemieux	La Verendrye	NDP	1999	2nd term	
Diane McGifford	Lord Roberts	NDP	1995	3rd term	
Leanne Rowat	Minnedosa	Progressive Conservative	2003	1st term	
MaryAnn Mihychuk	Minto	NDP	1995	3rd term	Until May 21, 2004
Andrew Swan (2004)	Minto	NDP	2004	1st term	From June 22, 2004
Mavis Taillieu	Morris	Progressive Conservative	2003	1st term	
Peter Dyck	Pembina	Progressive Conservative	1995	3rd term	
George Hickes	Point Douglas	NDP	1990	4th term	
David Faurschou	Portage la Prairie	Progressive Conservative	1997	3rd term	
Bidhu Jha	Radisson	NDP	2003	1st term	
Christine Melnick	Riel	NDP	2003	1st term	
Bonnie Mitchelson	River East	Progressive Conservative	1986	6th term	
Jon Gerrard	River Heights	Liberal	1999	2nd term	
Harry Schellenberg	Rossmere	NDP	1993, 1999	3rd term*	
Eric Robinson	Rupertsland	NDP	1993	4th term	
Len Derkach	Russell	Progressive Conservative	1986	6th term	
Greg Selinger	St. Boniface	NDP	1999	2nd term	
Bonnie Korzeniowski	St. James	NDP	1999	2nd term	
Gord Mackintosh	St. Johns	NDP	1993	4th term	
Marilyn Brick	St. Norbert	NDP	2003	1st term	
Nancy Allan	St. Vital	NDP	1999	2nd term	
Glen Cummings	Ste. Rose	Progressive Conservative	1986	6th term	
Theresa Oswald	Seine River	NDP	2003	1st term	
Gregory Dewar	Selkirk	NDP	1990	4th term	
Jack Reimer	Southdale	Progressive Conservative	1990	4th term	
Ron Schuler	Springfield	Progressive Conservative	1999	2nd term	
Kelvin Goertzen	Steinbach	Progressive Conservative	2003	1st term	
Rosann Wowchuk	Swan River	NDP	1990	4th term	
Cris Aglugub	The Maples	NDP	1999	2nd term	
Oscar Lathlin	The Pas	NDP	1990	4th term	
Steve Ashton	Thompson	NDP	1981	7th term	
Daryl Reid	Transcona	NDP	1990	4th term	
Merv Tweed	Turtle Mountain	Progressive Conservative	1995	3rd term	Until May 25, 2004
Cliff Cullen (2004)	Turtle Mountain	Progressive Conservative	2004	1st term	From July 2, 2004
Heather Stefanson	Tuxedo	Progressive Conservative	2000	2nd term	
Conrad Santos	Wellington	NDP	1981, (Note: Burrows) 1990	6th term*	
Rob Altemeyer	Wolseley	NDP	2003	1st term	

== By-elections ==
By-elections were held to replace members for various reasons:

Electoral district	Member elected	Affiliation	Election date	Reason
Minto	Andrew Swan	NDP	June 22, 2004	M Mihychuk resigned May 21, 2004 to run for mayor of Winnipeg
Turtle Mountain	Cliff Cullen	Progressive Conservative	July 2, 2004	M Tweed resigned May 25, 2004 to run for federal seat
Fort Whyte	Hugh McFadyen	Progressive Conservative	December 13, 2005	J Loewen resigned September 26, 2005 to run for federal seat
