= Progressive Conservative Party of Manitoba candidates in the 2007 Manitoba provincial election =

Provincial elections in Manitoba, Canada

The Progressive Conservative Party of Manitoba fielded fifty-six candidates in the 2007 Manitoba provincial election, and won 19 seats to remain as the Official Opposition party in the Legislative Assembly of Manitoba.

== Candidates ==
=== Northern Manitoba/Parkland ===
- Dauphin-Roblin: Lloyd McKinney
- Flin Flon: no candidate
- Rupertsland: David Harper
- Swan River: Maxine Plesiuk
- The Pas: George Muswaggon
- Thompson: Cory Phillips

=== Westman ===
- Arthur-Virden: Larry Maguire
- Brandon East: Drew Caldwell
- Brandon West: Rick Borotsik
- Minnedosa: Leanne Rowat
- Russell: Len Derkach

=== Central Manitoba ===
- Carman: Blaine Pedersen
- Gimli: Chris Bourgeois
- Interlake: Garry Wasylowski
- Lakeside: Ralph Eichler
- Morris: Mavis Taillieu
- Pembina: Peter Dyck
- Portage la Prairie: David Faurschou
- Selkirk: Gordie Dehn
- Ste. Rose: Stu Briese
- Turtle Mountain: Cliff Cullen

=== Eastman ===
- Emerson: Cliff Graydon
- Lac du Bonnet: Gerald Hawranik
- La Verendrye: Bob Stefaniuk
- Springfield: Ron Schuler
- Steinbach: Kelvin Goertzen

=== Northwest Winnipeg ===
- Burrows: Rick Negrych
- Inkster: Roger Bennett
- Kildonan: Brent Olynyk
- Point Douglas: Alexa Rosentreter
- St. Johns: Tim Hooper
- The Maples: Lou Fernandez
- Wellington: José Tomas

=== Northeast Winnipeg ===
- Concordia: Ken Waddell
- Elmwood: Allister Carrington
- Radisson: Linda West
- River East: Bonnie Mitchelson
- Rossmere: Cathy Cox
- St. Boniface: Jennifer Tarrant
- Transcona: Bryan McLeod

=== West Winnipeg ===
- Assiniboia: Kelly de Groot
- Charleswood: Myrna Driedger
- Kirkfield Park: Chris Kozier
- St. James: Kristine McGhee
- Tuxedo: Heather Stefanson
  3,982 (47.07%)

=== Central Winnipeg ===
- Fort Rouge: Christine Waddell
- Lord Roberts: Wilf Makus
- Minto: Kenny Daodu
- River Heights: Ashley Burner
- Wolseley: Gustav Nelson

=== South Winnipeg ===
- Fort Garry: Shaun McCaffrey
  2,101 (25.75%)
- Fort Whyte: Hugh McFadyen
- Riel: Trudy Turner
- Seine River: Steven Andjelic
- Southdale: Jack Reimer
- St. Norbert: Tara Brousseau
- St. Vital: Grant Cooper
