= 39th Manitoba Legislature =

Legislature of a Canadian province from 2007 to 2011

- Majority parliament

Parliament leaders
- Premier: Gary Doer; May 22, 2007 — October 19, 2009
- Greg Selinger; October 19, 2009 — September 6, 2011
- Leader of the Opposition: Hugh McFadyen

Party caucuses
- Government: New Democrat
- Opposition: Progressive Conservative
- Unrecognized: Liberal

Legislative Assembly
- Speaker of the Assembly: Daryl Reid
- Members: 57 MLA seats

Sovereign
- Monarch: Elizabeth II; 6 Feb. 1952 – 8 Sept. 2022
- Lieutenant governor: Hon. John Harvard
- Hon. Philip S. Lee

Sessions
- 1st session June 6, 2007 – November 8, 2007
- 2nd session November 20, 2007 – October 9, 2008
- 3rd session November 20, 2008 – October 8, 2009
- 4th session November 30, 2009 – June 17, 2010
- 5th session November 16, 2010 – June 16, 2011
← 38th	→ 40th

The 39th Manitoba Legislature was elected in a general election held May 22, 2007.

The majority NDP government under the leadership of Premier Gary Doer had been sustained for a third term in office.

On August 27, 2009, Doer announced that he would be stepping down as Premier. Greg Selinger was elected in a leadership convention held on October 17, 2009, and was sworn in as premier two days later.

Hugh McFadyen of the Progressive Conservative Party served as Leader of the Opposition.

George Hickes served as speaker for the assembly.

There were five sessions of the 39th Legislature:

The legislature was dissolved on September 6, 2011.

John Harvard was Lieutenant Governor of Manitoba until August 3, 2009, when Philip S. Lee became lieutenant governor.

== Members of the 39th Legislative Assembly ==
Member	Party	Riding	First elected / previously elected	No.# of term(s)	Notes
Larry Maguire	Progressive Conservative	Arthur-Virden	1999	3rd term	
Jim Rondeau	NDP	Assiniboia	1999	3rd term	
Drew Caldwell	NDP	Brandon East	1999	3rd term	
Rick Borotsik	Progressive Conservative	Brandon West	2007	1st term	
Doug Martindale	NDP	Burrows	1990	5th term	
Blaine Pedersen	Progressive Conservative	Carman	2007	1st term	
Myrna Driedger	Progressive Conservative	Charleswood	1998	4th term	
Gary Doer	NDP	Concordia	1986	7th term	Until October 19, 2009
Matt Wiebe (From March 2, 2010)	NDP	Concordia	2010	1st term	Elected in a by-election
Stan Struthers	NDP	Dauphin-Roblin	1995	4th term	
Jim Maloway	NDP	Elmwood	1986	7th term	Until September 8, 2008
Bill Blaikie (From March 24, 2009)	NDP	Elmwood	2009	1st term	Elected in a by-election
Cliff Graydon	Progressive Conservative	Emerson	2007	1st term	
Gerard Jennissen	NDP	Flin Flon	1995	4th term	
Kerri Irvin-Ross	NDP	Fort Garry	2003	2nd term	
Jennifer Howard	NDP	Fort Rouge	2007	1st term	
Hugh McFadyen	Progressive Conservative	Fort Whyte	2005	2nd term	
Peter Bjornson	NDP	Gimli	2003	2nd term	
Kevin Lamoureux	Liberal	Inkster	1988, 2003	5th term*	Until November 1, 2010
Tom Nevakshonoff	NDP	Interlake	1999	3rd term	
David Chomiak	NDP	Kildonan	1990	5th term	
Sharon Blady	NDP	Kirkfield Park	2007	1st term	
Ron Lemieux	NDP	La Verendrye	1999	3rd term	
Gerald Hawranik	Progressive Conservative	Lac Du Bonnet	2002	3rd term	
Ralph Eichler	Progressive Conservative	Lakeside	2003	2nd term	
Diane McGifford	NDP	Lord Roberts	1995	4th term	
Leanne Rowat	Progressive Conservative	Minnedosa	2003	2nd term	
Andrew Swan	NDP	Minto	2004	2nd term	
Mavis Taillieu	Progressive Conservative	Morris	2003	2nd term	
Peter Dyck	Progressive Conservative	Pembina	1995	4th term	
George Hickes †	NDP	Point Douglas	1990	5th term	
David Faurschou	Progressive Conservative	Portage la Prairie	1997	4th term	
Bidhu Jha	NDP	Radisson	2003	2nd term	
Christine Melnick	NDP	Riel	2003	2nd term	
Bonnie Mitchelson	Progressive Conservative	River East	1986	7th term	
Jon Gerrard	Liberal	River Heights	1999	3rd term	
Erna Braun	NDP	Rossmere	2007	1st term	
Eric Robinson	NDP	Rupertsland	1993	5th term	
Len Derkach	Progressive Conservative	Russell	1986	7th term	
Theresa Oswald	NDP	Seine River	2003	2nd term	
Gregory Dewar	NDP	Selkirk	1990	5th term	
Erin Selby	NDP	Southdale	2007	1st term	
Ron Schuler	Progressive Conservative	Springfield	1999	3rd term	
Greg Selinger	NDP	St. Boniface	1999	3rd term	
Bonnie Korzeniowski	NDP	St. James	1999	3rd term	
Gord Mackintosh	NDP	St. Johns	1993	5th term	
Marilyn Brick	NDP	St. Norbert	2003	2nd term	
Nancy Allan	NDP	St. Vital	1999	3rd term	
Stu Briese	Progressive Conservative	Ste. Rose	2007	1st term	
Kelvin Goertzen	Progressive Conservative	Steinbach	2003	2nd term	
Rosann Wowchuk	NDP	Swan River	1990	5th term	
Mohinder Saran	NDP	The Maples	2007	1st term	
Oscar Lathlin	NDP	The Pas	1990	5th term	Died in office November 1, 2008
Frank Whitehead (From March 24, 2009)	NDP	The Pas	2009	1st term	Elected in a by-election
Steve Ashton	NDP	Thompson	1981	8th term	
Daryl Reid	NDP	Transcona	1990	5th term	
Cliff Cullen	Progressive Conservative	Turtle Mountain	2004	2nd term	
Heather Stefanson	Progressive Conservative	Tuxedo	2000	3rd term	
Flor Marcelino	NDP	Wellington	2007	1st term	
Rob Altemeyer	NDP	Wolseley	2003	2nd term	

Source: "Historical Summaries" (PDF). Elections Manitoba.

== Standings changes since the 2007 general election ==
Number of members per party by date	2007	2008		2009		2010		2011
Number of members per party by date	May 22	Sep 8	Nov 1	Mar 24	Oct 19	Mar 2	Nov 1	Mar 25
NDP	36	35	34	36	35	36		
Progressive Conservative	19							18
Liberal	2						1	
Total members	57	56	55	57	56	57	56	55
Vacant	0	1	2	0	1	0	1	2
Government Majority	15	14	13	15	14	15	16	17

Membership changes in the 39th Assembly
Date	Name	District	Party	Reason
March 3, 2008	See List of Members			Election day of the 39th Manitoba general election
September 8, 2008	Jim Maloway	Elmwood	NDP	Resigned to run in federal election.
November 1, 2008	Oscar Lathlin	The Pas	NDP	Died at his cabin.
March 24, 2009	Bill Blaikie	Elmwood	NDP	Elected in a by-election.
March 24, 2009	Frank Whitehead	The Pas	NDP	Elected in a by-election.
October 19, 2009	Gary Doer	Concordia	NDP	Vacated seat to accept post as Canadian Ambassador to the US.
March 2, 2010	Matt Wiebe	Concordia	NDP	Elected in a by-election
November 1, 2010	Kevin Lamoureux	Inkster	Liberal	Vacated seat to run in federal by-election.
March 25, 2011	Gerald Hawranik	Lac du Bonnet	Progressive Conservative	Vacated seat

Sources:

- "MLA Biographies - Living". Legislative Assembly of Manitoba. Archived from the original on 2014-03-30.
- "MLA Biographies - Deceased". Legislative Assembly of Manitoba. Archived from the original on 2014-03-30.
