= 40th Manitoba Legislature =

Legislature of a Canadian province from 2011 to 2015

- Majority parliament
- Sep. 6, 2011 – Nov. 15, 2015

Parliament leaders
- Premier: Greg Selinger
- Leader of the Opposition: Hugh McFadyen; October 4, 2011 — July 30, 2012
- Brian Pallister; July 30, 2012 — March 16, 2016

Party caucuses
- Government: New Democrat
- Opposition: Progressive Conservative
- Unrecognized: Liberal

Legislative Assembly
- Speaker of the Assembly: Daryl Reid
- Members: 57 MLA seats

Sovereign
- Monarch: Elizabeth II; 6 Feb. 1952 – 8 Sept. 2022
- Lieutenant governor: Hon. Philip S. Lee; Hon. Janice Filmon
← 39th	→ 41st

The 40th Manitoba Legislature was created following a general election in 2011.

The New Democratic Party (NDP) led by Greg Selinger formed a majority government.

Following the election, Hugh McFadyen of the Progressive Conservative Party stepped down as Leader of the Opposition. Brian Pallister became Progressive Conservative party leader and Leader of the Opposition in September 2012.

The Lieutenant Governor was Philip S. Lee until 2015, then Janice Filmon.

== Members of the 40th Legislative Assembly ==
Name	Party	Riding	First elected / previously elected	No.# of term(s)	Notes
Stu Briese	Progressive Conservative	Agassiz	2007	2nd term	
Larry Maguire	Progressive Conservative	Arthur-Virden	1999	4th term	Until November 25, 2013
Doyle Piwniuk (From January 28, 2014)	Progressive Conservative	Arthur-Virden	2014	1st term	Elected in a by-election
**Jim Rondeau**	New Democratic	Assiniboia	1999	4th term	
Drew Caldwell	New Democratic	Brandon East	1999	4th term	
Reg Helwer	Progressive Conservative	Brandon West	2011	1st term	
Melanie Wight	New Democratic	Burrows	2011	1st term	
Myrna Driedger	Progressive Conservative	Charleswood	1998	5th term	
Matt Wiebe	New Democratic	Concordia	2010	2nd term	
**Stan Struthers**	New Democratic	Dauphin	1995	5th term	
**Ron Lemieux**	New Democratic	Dawson Trail	2010	2nd term	
Jim Maloway	New Democratic	Elmwood	1986, 2011	8th term*	
Cliff Graydon	Progressive Conservative	Emerson	2007	2nd term	
Clarence Pettersen	New Democratic	Flin Flon	2011	1st term	
James Allum	New Democratic	Fort Garry-Riverview	2011	1st term	
Kerri Irvin-Ross	New Democratic	Fort Richmond	2003	3rd term	
**Jennifer Howard**	New Democratic	Fort Rouge	2007	2nd term	
Hugh McFadyen	Progressive Conservative	Fort Whyte	2005	3rd term	Until July 30, 2012
Brian Pallister (From September 4, 2012)	Progressive Conservative	Fort Whyte	1992, (Note: Portage la Prairie) 2012	3rd term*	Elected in a by-election
**Peter Bjornson**	New Democratic	Gimli	2003	3rd term	
Tom Nevakshonoff	New Democratic	Interlake	1999	4th term	
**Eric Robinson**	New Democratic	Kewatinook	1993	6th term	
**David Chomiak**	New Democratic	Kildonan	1990	6th term	
Sharon Blady	New Democratic	Kirkfield Park	2007	2nd term	
Dennis Smook	Progressive Conservative	La Verendrye	2011	1st term	
Wayne Ewasko	Progressive Conservative	Lac Du Bonnet	2011	1st term	
Ralph Eichler	Progressive Conservative	Lakeside	2003	3rd term	
**Flor Marcelino**	New Democratic	Logan	2007	2nd term	
Blaine Pedersen	Progressive Conservative	Midland	2007	2nd term	
**Andrew Swan**	New Democratic	Minto	2004	3rd term	
Cameron Friesen	Progressive Conservative	Morden-Winkler	2011	1st term	
Mavis Taillieu	Progressive Conservative	Morris	2003	3rd term	Until February 12, 2013
Shannon Martin (From January 28, 2014)	Progressive Conservative	Morris	2014	1st term	Elected in a by-election
Kevin Chief	New Democratic	Point Douglas	2011	1st term	
Ian Wishart	Progressive Conservative	Portage la Prairie	2011	1st term	
Bidhu Jha	New Democratic	Radisson	2003	3rd term	
Leanne Rowat	Progressive Conservative	Riding Mountain	2003	3rd term	
Christine Melnick	New Democratic	Riel	2003	3rd term	
Bonnie Mitchelson	Progressive Conservative	River East	1986	8th term	
Jon Gerrard	Liberal	River Heights	1999	4th term	
Erna Braun	New Democratic	Rossmere	2007	2nd term	
**Theresa Oswald**	New Democratic	Seine River	2003	3rd term	
Gregory Dewar	New Democratic	Selkirk	1990	6th term	
**Erin Selby**	New Democratic	Southdale	2007	2nd term	
Cliff Cullen	Progressive Conservative	Spruce Woods	2004	3rd term	
**Greg Selinger**	New Democratic	St. Boniface	1999	4th term	
Deanne Crothers	New Democratic	St. James	2011	1st term	
**Gord Mackintosh**	New Democratic	St. Johns	1993	6th term	
Dave Gaudreau	New Democratic	St. Norbert	2011	1st term	
Ron Schuler	Progressive Conservative	St. Paul	1999	4th term	
**Nancy Allan**	New Democratic	St. Vital	1999	4th term	
Kelvin Goertzen	Progressive Conservative	Steinbach	2003	3rd term	
Ron Kostyshyn	New Democratic	Swan River	2011	1st term	
Mohinder Saran	New Democratic	The Maples	2007	2nd term	
Frank Whitehead	New Democratic	The Pas	2009	2nd term	Until May 26, 2014
Amanda Lathlin (From April 22, 2015)	New Democratic	The Pas	2015	1st term	Elected in a by-election
**Steve Ashton**	New Democratic	Thompson	1981	9th term	
Daryl Reid	New Democratic	Transcona	1990	6th term	
Heather Stefanson	Progressive Conservative	Tuxedo	2000	4th term	
Ted Marcelino	New Democratic	Tyndall Park	2011	1st term	
Rob Altemeyer	New Democratic	Wolseley	2011	1st term	

- Members in **bold** are in the Cabinet of Manitoba

^{†} Speaker of the Assembly

Source: "MLA Alphabetical Listing". Legislative Assembly of Manitoba.

== Standings changes in the 40th Assembly ==
Number of members per party by date	2011	2012		2013		2014				2015
Number of members per party by date	Oct 6	July 30	Sep 4	Feb 12	Nov 25	Jan 28	Feb 4	May 16	November 13	April 22
NDP	37						36	35	36	37
Progressive Conservative	19	18	19	18	17	19				
Liberal	1									
Independent	0						1		0	
Total members	57	56	57	56	55	57		56		57
Vacant	0	1	0	1	2	0		1		0
Government Majority	17	18	17	18	19	17	16	15	16	17

Membership changes in the 40th Assembly
Date	Name	District	Party	Reason
October 4, 2011	See List of Members			Election day of the 40th Manitoba general election
July 30, 2012	Hugh McFadyen	Fort Whyte	Progressive Conservative	Vacated seat.
September 4, 2012	Brian Pallister	Fort Whyte	Progressive Conservative	Elected in a by-election.
February 12, 2013	Mavis Taillieu	Morris	Progressive Conservative	Vacated seat.
November 25, 2013	Larry Maguire	Arthur-Virden	Progressive Conservative	Vacated seat to run in federal election
January 28, 2014	Shannon Martin	Morris	Progressive Conservative	Elected in a by-election.
January 28, 2014	Doyle Piwniuk	Arthur-Virden	Progressive Conservative	Elected in a by-election.
February 4, 2014	Christine Melnick	Riel	NDP	Removed from caucus.
May 16, 2014	Frank Whitehead	The Pas	NDP	Vacated seat.
November 13, 2014	Christine Melnick	Riel	NDP	Readmitted to NDP caucus.
April 22, 2015	Amanda Lathlin	The Pas	NDP	Elected in a by-election

Source: "MLA Biographies - Living". Legislative Assembly of Manitoba. Archived from the original on 2014-03-30.

== See also ==
- 2007 Manitoba general election
- Legislative Assembly of Manitoba

== Notes ==
Preceded by 39th Assembly	Manitoba Legislative Assemblies; 2011–present	Succeeded by 41st Assembly
