= 37th Manitoba Legislature =

The members of the 37th Manitoba Legislature were elected in the Manitoba general election held in September 1999. The legislature sat from November 18, 1999, to May 2, 2003.

The New Democratic Party led by Gary Doer formed the government.

Gary Filmon of the Progressive Conservative Party was Leader of the Opposition. After Filmon's resignation in 2000, Bonnie Mitchelson served as acting party leader until Stuart Murray was elected leader in November 2000.

George Hickes served as speaker for the assembly.

There were four sessions of the 37th Legislature:

Session	Start	End
1st	November 18, 1999	August 17, 2000
2nd	December 5, 2000	July 5, 2001
3rd	November 13, 2001	August 9, 2002
4th	November 27, 2002	May 2, 2003

Peter Liba was Lieutenant Governor of Manitoba.

== Members of the Assembly ==
The following members were elected to the assembly in 1999:

Member	Electoral district	Party	First elected / previously elected	No.# of term(s)	Notes
Larry Maguire	Arthur-Virden	Progressive Conservative	1999	1st term	
Jim Rondeau	Assiniboia	NDP	1999	1st term	
Drew Caldwell	Brandon East	NDP	1999	1st term	
Scott Smith	Brandon West	NDP	1999	1st term	
Doug Martindale	Burrows	NDP	1990	3rd term	
Denis Rocan	Carman	Progressive Conservative	1986	5th term	
Myrna Driedger	Charleswood	Progressive Conservative	1998	2nd term	
Gary Doer	Concordia	NDP	1986	5th term	
Stan Struthers	Dauphin—Roblin	NDP	1995	2nd term	
Jim Maloway	Elmwood	NDP	1986	5th term	
Jack Penner	Emerson	Progressive Conservative	1988	4th term	
Gerard Jennissen	Flin Flon	NDP	1995	2nd term	
Joy Smith	Fort Garry	Progressive Conservative	1999	1st term	
Tim Sale	Fort Rouge	NDP	1995	2nd term	
John Loewen	Fort Whyte	Progressive Conservative	1999	1st term	
Ed Helwer	Gimli	Progressive Conservative	1988	4th term	
Becky Barrett	Inkster	NDP	1990	3rd term	
Tom Nevakshonoff	Interlake	NDP	1999	1st term	
Dave Chomiak	Kildonan	NDP	1990	3rd term	
Eric Stefanson	Kirkfield Park	Progressive Conservative	1990	3rd term	Until September 7, 2000
Stuart Murray (2000)	Kirkfield Park	Progressive Conservative	2000	1st term	From November 21, 2000
Darren Praznik	Lac du Bonnet	Progressive Conservative	1988	4th term	Until February 8, 2002
Gerald Hawranik (2002)	Lac du Bonnet	Progressive Conservative	2002	1st term	From March 12, 2002
Harry Enns	Lakeside	Progressive Conservative	1966	10th term	
Ron Lemieux	La Verendrye	NDP	1999	1st term	
Diane McGifford	Lord Roberts	NDP	1995	2nd term	
Harold Gilleshammer	Minnedosa	Progressive Conservative	1988	4th term	
MaryAnn Mihychuk	Minto	NDP	1995	2nd term	
Frank Pitura	Morris	Progressive Conservative	1995	2nd term	
Peter Dyck	Pembina	Progressive Conservative	1995	2nd term	
George Hickes	Point Douglas	NDP	1990	3rd term	
David Faurschou	Portage la Prairie	Progressive Conservative	1997	2nd term	
Marianne Cerilli	Radisson	NDP	1990	3rd term	
Linda Asper	Riel	NDP	1999	1st term	
Bonnie Mitchelson	River East	Progressive Conservative	1986	5th term	
Jon Gerrard	River Heights	Liberal	1999	1st term	
Harry Schellenberg	Rossmere	NDP	1993, 1999	2nd term*	
Eric Robinson	Rupertsland	NDP	1993	3rd term	
Len Derkach	Russell	Progressive Conservative	1986	5th term	
Greg Selinger	St. Boniface	NDP	1999	1st term	
Bonnie Korzeniowski	St. James	NDP	1999	1st term	
Gord Mackintosh	St. Johns	NDP	1993	3rd term	
Marcel Laurendeau	St. Norbert	Progressive Conservative	1990	3rd term	
Nancy Allan	St. Vital	NDP	1999	1st term	
Glen Cummings	Ste. Rose	Progressive Conservative	1986	5th term	
Louise Dacquay	Seine River	Progressive Conservative	1990	3rd term	
Gregory Dewar	Selkirk	NDP	1990	3rd term	
Jack Reimer	Southdale	Progressive Conservative	1990	3rd term	
Ron Schuler	Springfield	Progressive Conservative	1999	1st term	
Jim Penner	Steinbach	Progressive Conservative	1999	1st term	
Rosann Wowchuk	Swan River	NDP	1990	3rd term	
Cris Aglugub	The Maples	NDP	1999	1st term	
Oscar Lathlin	The Pas	NDP	1990	3rd term	
Steve Ashton	Thompson	NDP	1981	6th term	
Daryl Reid	Transcona	NDP	1990	3rd term	
Merv Tweed	Turtle Mountain	Progressive Conservative	1995	2nd term	
Gary Filmon	Tuxedo	Progressive Conservative	1979	7th term	Until September 18, 2000
Heather Stefanson (2000)	Tuxedo	Progressive Conservative	2000	1st term	From November 21, 2000
Conrad Santos	Wellington	NDP	1981, (Note: Burrows) 1990	5th term*	
Jean Friesen	Wolseley	NDP	1990	3rd term	

== By-elections ==
By-elections were held to replace members for various reasons:

Electoral district	Member elected	Affiliation	Election date	Reason
Kirkfield Park	Stuart Murray	Progressive Conservative	November 21, 2000	E Stefanson resigned September 7, 2000 to allow S Murray to run for election
Tuxedo	Heather Stefanson	Progressive Conservative	November 21, 2000	G Filmon resigned September 18, 2000
Lac du Bonnet	Gerald Hawranik	Progressive Conservative	March 12, 2002	D Praznik resigned February 8, 2002
