= Herbert Wright (politician) =

Canadian politician

Herbert Henry Wright (October 2, 1880—September 21, 1944) was a politician in Manitoba, Canada. He served in the Legislative Assembly of Manitoba from 1936 to 1941.

Wright was born in Eugenia Falls, Ontario, and was educated in Emerson, Manitoba and at Wesley College in Winnipeg. He worked as a customs broker. Wright also saw action in World War I, serving with the 29th Battalion of the C.E.F. from 1914 to 1919 as a machine-gunner.

He first ran for the Manitoba legislature in the 1927 provincial election as a Liberal candidate in Emerson. He finished second to Progressive candidate Robert Curran, losing by 139 votes.

Wright later aligned himself with a group of Liberals who opposed the party's 1932 alliance (and subsequent merger) with the Progressives. He campaigned in the 1936 provincial election as a Liberal Independent, and defeated Curran by twenty votes. Only one other Liberal Independent was elected, and Wright served on the opposition benches for the next four years.

In 1940, Wright endorsed the all-party coalition government created by Liberal-Progressive Premier John Bracken. He campaigned for re-election in the 1941 election as an official Liberal-Progressive candidate, but lost to pro-coalition independent John Solomon by 701 votes.

Wright died in the Winnipeg General Hospital at the age of 63.
