= Brian MacLeod =

Brian MacLeod may refer to:

- Brian MacLeod (American musician) (born 1962), American recording drummer and songwriter
- Brian MacLeod (Canadian musician) (1952–1992), songwriter and music producer, best known as a member of the bands Chilliwack and The Headpins

== See also ==
- Bryan McLeod, Canadian politician and unsuccessful candidate for municipal, provincial, and federal offices in the 2000s decade
