= George Walton (Manitoba politician) =

Canadian politician (1854–1925)

Member of the Legislative Assembly of Manitoba
- In office 1907–1910

Personal details
- Party: Manitoba Liberal Party

George Walton (June 21, 1854 – February 12, 1925) was a politician in Manitoba, Canada. He served in the Legislative Assembly of Manitoba from 1907 to 1910, as a member of the Manitoba Liberal Party.

Walton was born in West Peterborough County, Canada West, and moved to Manitoba in 1879. He settled in Emerson, and ran businesses for hardware and agricultural implements. He also served as deputy sheriff and county court bailiff for eight years.

Walton married Margaret Ann Robinson.

He campaigned for the House of Commons of Canada in the 1896 federal election as a candidate of the Liberal Party of Canada, and lost to Conservative candidate A.C.C. Larivière by 666 votes in Provencher.

In 1900, he moved to Winnipeg.

Walton first ran for the Manitoba legislature in the 1903 provincial election, and lost to Conservative candidate David H. McFadden by nineteen votes in the provincial Emerson constituency. He tried again in the 1907 election, and this time defeated McFadden by 105 votes. The Conservative Party won the election, and Watson served as an opposition member for the next three years. He lost to McFadden in the 1910 election by nine votes.

He sought a return to the legislature in the 1914 election, and this time lost to McFadden by 46 votes.

Walton died at home in Winnipeg at the age of 70 after an extended illness.
