= Robert Curran (Canadian politician) =

Canadian politician (1883–1958)

Robert Franklin Curran (February 10, 1883 – 1958) was a politician in Manitoba, Canada. He served in the Legislative Assembly of Manitoba from 1927 to 1936.

Curran was born in Emerson, Manitoba, the son of Robert Curran and Lucy Robinson, and was educated at public schools in the region. He worked as a farmer, and served as president of the United Farmers of Manitoba (UFM) local. In 1908, Curran married Annie Copeland. He first ran for the Manitoba legislature as a UFM candidate in the 1922 provincial election, but finished third against independent candidate Dmytro Yakimischak in the Emerson constituency.

The UFM won the 1922 election, and governed as the Progressive Party. Curran campaigned as a government candidate in the 1927 election, identifying himself as a Liberal-Progressive. He was elected in a field of six candidates, with Yakimischak falling to fourth place. Curran served as a backbench supporter of John Bracken's government in the parliament which followed.

In 1932, the Progressive Party forged a formal alliance with the Manitoba Liberal Party, and all government members became known as Liberal-Progressives. Curran ran under this banner again in the 1932 provincial campaign, and defeated his Conservative opponent by 245 votes.

He was defeated in the 1936 election, losing to Independent Liberal Herbert Wright by only twenty votes.
