= Thomas Carney (Canadian politician) =

Canadian politician

Thomas Carney (ca 1830 – 1905) was an American-born inventor and political figure in Manitoba, Canada. He represented Emerson from 1880 to 1883 in the Legislative Assembly of Manitoba as a Conservative.

He was born in Bradford County, Pennsylvania and was educated there. Carney married Mary Ann Kaufelt. In 1873, he came to Manitoba and, with William Newton Fairbanks, founded the town of Emerson. Carney was mayor of Emerson from 1880 to 1883. He was elected to the Manitoba assembly in an 1880 by-election held after William Nash was named registrar. While in Emerson, he developed an idea for a "coin changer" (cash register). In 1884, he left Emerson to join the National Cash Register company. Carney died in Dayton, Ohio.
