= Charles Douglas (Canadian politician) =

Canadian politician

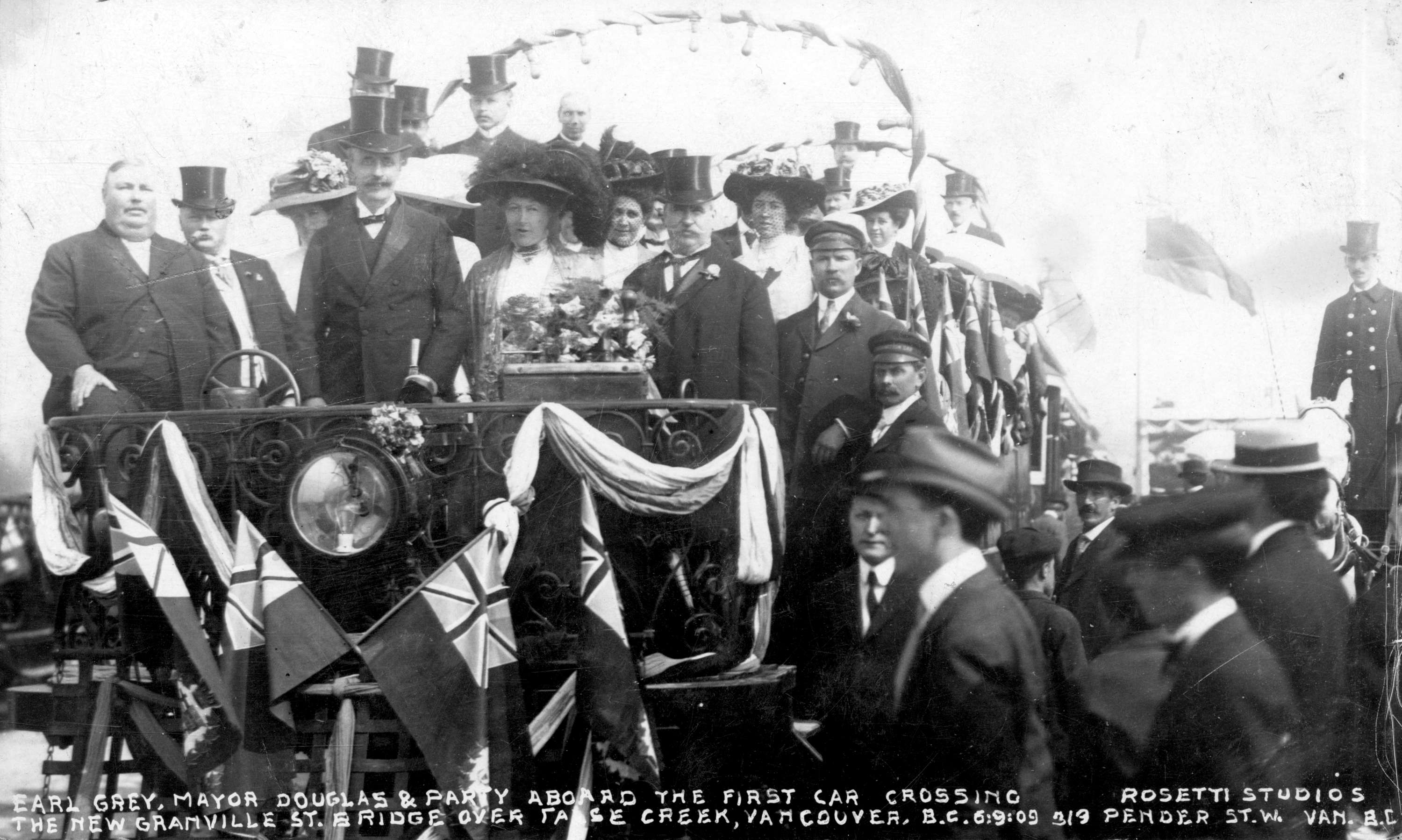
Governor General Earl Grey (centre) and Douglas (on Lady Grey's left) at the opening of the new Granville Street Bridge, Vancouver, 6 September 1909

Charles Stanford Douglas (October 1, 1852 – April 15, 1917) born in Madison, Wisconsin, was a co-journalist and realtor, and the 13th mayor of Vancouver, British Columbia, serving a single term in 1909. He also represented Emerson in the Legislative Assembly of Manitoba as a Conservative from 1883 to 1888.

The son of John A. Douglas, Charles Standford Douglas was educated at Wayland University. In Wisconsin. In 1877, he move to Canada and settled in Fort William, Ontario, where he became the publisher of the Fort William Day Book. The following year, he relocated to Emerson, Manitoba, and founded a new newspaper, The Emerson International. In 1881, he married Annie Johnston. Douglas served as the U.S. vice-consul at Emerson, was a member of the town council, and became mayor of 1888. He was elected to the Manitoba assembly in an 1883 which occurred after Frederick Burnham was unseated for bribery and was reelected in 1886.

In 1909, Douglas married Elizabeth Manley (née Fisher), a widow, after the death of his first wife.

He died in Vancouver at the age of 64.
