= Frederick Ernest Burnham =

Canadian politician

Frederick Ernest Burnham (December 13, 1847 – after 1883) was a lawyer and political figure in Manitoba. He represented Emerson in 1883 in the Legislative Assembly of Manitoba as a Liberal.

He was born in Peterborough, Canada West, the son of Elias Burnham and Ann Whitney. Burnham was called to the Ontario bar in 1868 and practised law in Peterborough. In 1869, he married Ellen Eliza Cluxton. He ran unsuccessfully for a seat in the Manitoba assembly in 1879. By 1881, he was practising law in Emerson, Manitoba. His election in 1883 was overturned due to bribery and Burnham was defeated by Charles Douglas in the by-election that followed later that year.
