= John David Baskerville =

Canadian politician

- Born: April 10, 1857; Ottawa, Canada West
- Died: January 31, 1926 (aged 68); Franklin, Manitoba, Canada
- Occupations: farmer, politician

John David Baskerville (April 10, 1857 – January 31, 1926) was a politician in Manitoba, Canada, serving in the Legislative Assembly of Manitoba from 1915 to 1920.

Baskerville was born in Ottawa, Canada West (now Ontario) the son of Joseph Baskerville, and was educated at Ramseys Corners. In 1888, he married Jennie Oatway. He moved to Manitoba and worked as a farmer, also serving as a municipal councillor and school trustee for 27 years. In religion, Baskerville was a Presbyterian.

He was elected to the Manitoba legislature in the 1915 provincial election, defeating his Conservative opponent by 721 votes in the rural, southeastern constituency of Emerson. The Liberals won a landslide majority government in this election, and Baskerville served as a backbench supporter of Tobias Norris's administration for the next five years.

Baskerville was defeated in the 1920 provincial election, finishing third against Farmer candidate Dmytro Yakimischak.

Around 1920, Baskerville retired from farming and moved to Dominion City.

He died in the Rural Municipality of Franklin at the age of 68.
