= Jim Penner =

Canadian politician and businessman

Jim Penner MLA

Member of the Legislative Assembly of Manitoba for Steinbach
- In office 1999–2003
- Preceded by: Albert Driedger
- Succeeded by: Kelvin Goertzen

Personal details
- Born: September 4, 1939 Rosthern, Saskatchewan, Canada
- Died: 17 January 2004 (aged 64) Steinbach, Manitoba, Canada
- Party: Progressive Conservative
- Profession: Businessman

Jim Penner (September 4, 1939 – January 17, 2004) was a businessman and politician in Manitoba, Canada. He served in the Manitoba legislature from 1999 to 2003.

Penner was born in Rosthern, Saskatchewan and moved to Steinbach, Manitoba in 1946 at the age of 7, where his father bought a grocery store. Penner grew the store into Penner Foods Limited, with six locations, a company for which he was President and CEO from 1962 to 1998 (overseeing a business which employed 800 workers). Penner was appointed to Trinity Western University's Board of Governors in 1981. He was a graduate of Trinity University in Chicago and was awarded an honorary degree in 2001.

In 2002 Penner was honoured as the Humanitarian of the Year by the Variety Club of Manitoba.

Penner was elected to the Manitoba legislature in the general election of 1999, running as a Progressive Conservative in the rural, southern riding of Steinbach. Penner defeated his nearest opponent by almost 5000 votes, despite the fact that the Progressive Conservatives were defeated provincially.

In the Manitoba Legislature, Penner served as opposition critic for Consumer and Corporate Affairs and Finance. He chose not to run for re-election in 2003, having been diagnosed with cancer. Penner died on January 17, 2004.
