= Gabriel Girard (politician) =

Canadian politician

Member of the Legislative Assembly of Manitoba for Emerson
- In office June 25, 1969 – June 28, 1973
- Preceded by: John Tanchak
- Succeeded by: Steve Derewianchuk

Personal details
- Born: September 14, 1935 St. Eustache, Manitoba, Canada
- Died: February 4, 2006 (aged 70) Winnipeg, Manitoba, Canada
- Party: Progressive Conservative

Gabriel Girard (September 14, 1935 – February 4, 2006) was a politician in Manitoba, Canada. He served as a Progressive Conservative member of the Manitoba legislature from 1969 to 1973.

He was born in St. Eustache, Manitoba, the son of Paul and Cecile Girard. Girard worked as a teacher, principal, superintendent of schools, real estate agent and grain farmer. He also managed a farm equipment dealership and served on the St. Boniface school board. He married Marcie Yarmie.

Girard first ran for the Manitoba legislature in the 1966 election, in the rural constituency of Emerson in the province's southeast corner. He lost to Liberal incumbent John Tanchak by 175 votes. He ran again in the 1969 election and defeated Tanchak by 453 votes, as the Liberals saw their support base decrease in rural Manitoba.

Girard does not appear to have played a major role in the legislature, and did not seek re-election in 1973.
