= John R. Solomon =

Canadian politician

John Roman Solomon (May 24, 1910 in Zoria, Manitoba – June 25, 1985) was a politician in Manitoba, Canada. He served in the Legislative Assembly of Manitoba from 1941 to 1957, alternately as an independent and as a Liberal-Progressive.

Solomon was educated at the University of Manitoba where he earned a law degree. He was called to the Manitoba bar in 1936 and worked as a barrister. Barry was the director for the Selkirk Board of Trade. He was also a member of the Ukrainian Self Reliance League.

He was first elected to the Manitoba legislature in the 1941 provincial election, for the rural constituency of Emerson. At the time, Manitoba was governed by a coalition ministry representing all of the major parties, and some independents. Solomon contested the Liberal-Progressive nomination, but lost it to Herbert Wright and entered the contest as a pro-coalition Independent Liberal. He defeated Wright by 701 votes in the general election.

Solomon joined the Liberal-Progressive party after the election, and was returned without difficulty in the 1945 provincial election. In the 1949 election, he was returned by acclamation.

Solomon lost the Emerson Liberal-Progressive nomination to Frank Casper in the buildup to the 1953 election, but campaigned as an "Independent Liberal-Progressive" and defeated Caspar by 174 votes. He resigned his seat in 1957, when he was appointed a county court judge. In 1971, Solomon was named to the Court of Queen's Bench of Manitoba and served until 1983.

He died in Winnipeg at the age of 75.
