= Keystone Agricultural Producers =

- Abbreviation: KAP
- Formation: 1984
- Type: Non-profit
- Headquarters: Winnipeg, Manitoba
- President, Board of Directors: Jill Verwey
- General Manager: Brenna Mahoney
- Website: www.kap.ca

Keystone Agricultural Producers (KAP) is Manitoba’s largest general farm policy organization, responsible for representing the interests of all Manitoba farmers. Their membership includes direct paying farmer and farm commodity groups. KAP is one of the province's most active lobby groups and is a member organization of the Canadian Federation of Agriculture.

KAP was formed in 1984 to replace the former Manitoba Farm Bureau, and is headquartered in Winnipeg, Manitoba.

KAP is also responsible for the administration of the industry safety association for Manitoba farmers, FarmSafe Manitoba, which provides free on-farm safety services and resources as well as educational activities and advocacy.

== Activities ==
The organization lobbies government and industry on issues that affect Manitoba farmers. For example, KAP was part of the effort to develop legislative sanctions for Canadian railways that failed to transport minimum grain volumes for farmers in 2013. As a result, the Canadian National Railway and Canadian Pacific Railway were fined a combined $150,000, and the federal government brought in the Fair Rail for Grain Farmers Act in 2014, which required railways to move a minimum amount of grain per week.

KAP uses the news media to bring attention to issues producers face. During heavy flooding in 2014 when nearly 2 million acres in the province were lost to water damage, KAP was vocal in the media about the need for better crop insurance coverage.

KAP promotes agriculture’s contributions to Manitoba and Canada. Through a 2012 bus board campaign entitled "Sharing the Harvest," KAP advertised the fact that farming, along with the food and beverage-processing and food-service industries, generated over $10 billion per year in Manitoba in 2010.

KAP has achieved more recent successes through their advocacy work, including the Hay West initiative in 2021. In 2022, KAP played key roles in achieving an increased rebate on the education property tax rebate for Manitoba farmers, a reduction in Crown land rent rates, an increase to funded vet seats for Manitoba students at the Western College of Veterinary Medicine, and $500 million in new funding for the provinces through the Sustainable Canadian Agricultural Partnership.

== Organizational structure ==
Keystone Agricultural Producers is funded by its members, and governed by an elected executive and board of directors. Presidents are elected from the KAP membership, and may serve up to four one-year terms. The current president of KAP is Jill Verwey, who replaced Bill Campbell in 2023. Previous Presidents of KAP include Jack Penner, Ian Wishart, Doug Chorney, and Dan Mazier.

KAP policy is developed by members, through resolutions passed at the annual general meeting and at general council meetings held three times per year. KAP hosts policy setting events each year. Resolutions that are passed at these events are forwarded to the board of directors and their respected policy committee for review, consideration and priority setting.
