= William Nash (Manitoba politician) =

Canadian politician

William Hill Nash (March 15, 1846 – April 26, 1917) was a lawyer and political figure in Manitoba, Canada. He represented Emerson from 1879 to 1880 in the Legislative Assembly of Manitoba as a Liberal-Conservative.

He was born in London, Canada West and first came to Manitoba in 1870 with the Wolseley Expedition. Nash returned to Manitoba in 1874, settling in Emerson. He was a large property holder and also served as captain in the Manitoba militia. Nash resigned his seat in the provincial assembly after he was named land registrar. Nash served as mayor of Emerson from 1883 to 1885. He married Katherine Margaret Armstrong. Nash commanded a company during the North-West Rebellion of 1885. He resigned from military service due to poor health and moved to Winnipeg in 1886, where he worked in the land titles office. Nash died at home in Winnipeg at the age of 71.
