= John Tanchak =

Canadian politician

- Born: May 7, 1905; Rosa, Manitoba, Canada
- Died: May 13, 1983 (aged 78); Winnipeg, Manitoba, Canada
- Occupation: Politician

John Peter Tanchak (May 7, 1905 in Rosa, Manitoba – May 13, 1983) was a politician in Manitoba, Canada. He was a Liberal member of the Legislative Assembly of Manitoba from 1957 to 1969.

The son of Peter Tanchak and Mary Mihaychuk, Tanchak was educated at the University of Manitoba, and worked as a general merchant and turkey farmer before entering political life. In 1934, he married Doris Osachuk. He was first elected to the Manitoba legislature in a by-election on November 14, 1957, defeating Progressive Conservative challenger Frank Casper by nearly 200 votes in the southeastern riding of Emerson. He was re-elected by a greater margin in the 1958 provincial election, although the Liberals lost power at the provincial level.

He was returned by comfortable margins in the elections of 1959 and 1962, but defeated PC challenger Gabriel Girard by only 165 votes in the 1966 election. In the 1969 election, he lost to Girard by 463 votes as Liberal support plummeted in the province.

During his time in office, he worked to establish chicken and turkey producer boards in the province.

Tanchak was chairman of the Manitoba Turkey Marketing Board and the Canadian Turkey Marketing Association.

He died in Winnipeg at the age of 78.
