= Borderland (electoral district) =

Provincial electoral district in Manitoba, Canada

Manitoba electoral district

Provincial electoral district
- Legislature: Legislative Assembly of Manitoba
MLA
Josh Guenter
Progressive Conservative
- District created: 2018
- First contested: 2019
- Last contested: 2023

Demographics
- Population (2016): 22,925
- Electors (2019): 11,996
- Area (km²): 3,245
- Pop. density (per km²): 7.1
- Census division(s): Division No. 2, Division No. 3
- Census subdivision(s): Altona, Emerson-Franklin, Montcalm, Rhineland, Roseau Rapids 2A, Roseau River 2, Stanley

Borderland is a provincial electoral district of Manitoba, Canada. The riding was created by the 2018 provincial redistribution out of parts of Emerson and Morden-Winkler.

== Members of the Legislative Assembly ==
Assembly	Years	Member	Party
42nd	2019–2023	Josh Guenter	Progressive Conservative
43rd	2023–present	Josh Guenter	Progressive Conservative

== Election results ==
=== 2023 ===
2023 Manitoba general election
Party	Candidate	Votes	%	±%	Expenditures
Progressive Conservative	Josh Guenter	4,479	72.66	+6.57	$20,013.59
New Democratic	Rick Derksen	921	14.94	+11.01	$392.00
Liberal	Loren Braul	764	12.39	-4.19	$0.00
Total valid votes/expense limit		6,164	99.64	–	$47,807.00
Total rejected and declined ballots		22	0.36	–	
Turnout		6,186	50.45	-11.41	
Eligible voters		12,262			
Progressive Conservative hold		Swing		-2.22	
Source(s) Source: Elections Manitoba

=== 2019 ===
2019 Manitoba general election
Party	Candidate	Votes	%	±%	Expenditures
Progressive Conservative	Josh Guenter	4,886	66.09	-13.2	$26,537.26
Liberal	Loren Braul	1,226	16.58	+1.7	$17,222.73
Independent	Cliff Graydon	740	10.01	–	$31,729.30
New Democratic	Liz Cronk	291	3.94	+0.1	$1,792.07
Green	Ken Henry	250	3.38	+1.4	$0.00
Total valid votes		7,393	–		
Rejected		28	–		
Eligible voters / turnout		11,996	61.86		
Progressive Conservative hold		Swing		-7.4	
Source(s) Source: Manitoba. Chief Electoral Officer (2019). Statement of Votes for the 42nd Provincial General Election, September 10, 2019 (PDF) (Report). Winnipeg: Elections Manitoba. "Candidate Election Returns". Elections Manitoba.

2016 provincial election redistributed results
Party	%
Progressive Conservative	79.3
Liberal	14.9
New Democratic	3.8
Green	2.0

== See also ==
- List of Manitoba provincial electoral districts
- Canadian provincial electoral districts
