= Josh Guenter =

Canadian politician ()

Josh Guenter MLA

Member of the Legislative Assembly of Manitoba for Borderland
- Incumbent
- Assumed office September 10, 2019
- Preceded by: New district

Personal details
- Born: Altona, Manitoba, Canada
- Party: Progressive Conservative
- Education: University of Manitoba University of Ottawa
- Occupation: Political aide; long-haul trucker

Josh Guenter MLA is a Canadian politician and member of the Legislative Assembly of Manitoba, representing the electoral division of Borderland. He was elected in the 2019 Manitoba general election as a member of the Progressive Conservative Party of Manitoba. He was re-elected in the 2023 provincial election.

== Early life ==
Guenter was born in Altona, Manitoba, and grew up near the community of Gnadenthal. After graduating from high school, he studied briefly at the University of Manitoba and University of Ottawa.

== Political career ==
He worked on Parliament Hill for two years while living in Ottawa, Ontario, and more recently for Candice Bergen and Cameron Friesen. Guenter won the Manitoba PC Party nomination for Borderland on April 11, 2019. The riding was created by the 2018 provincial redistribution out of parts of Emerson and Morden-Winkler.

On September 10, 2019, Guenter became the youngest ever Progressive Conservative to be elected to the Manitoba Legislative Assembly at the age of 25. He was appointed Legislative Assistant to the Minister of Finance, and also served as the Legislative Assistant to the Minister of Health and Seniors Care, and as a member of the provincial Treasury Board. He has served on the Economic Growth and Development Committee of Cabinet, as well as the Public Sector Compensation Committee of Cabinet.

On October 24, 2023, he was appointed as the Shadow Minister for Transportation and Infrastructure and as the Shadow Minister for Consumer Protection and Government Services.

Guenter opposes Islamic education kits in Manitoba schools, telling media “Their [Government] priorities? Islamic tool kits in schools written by Muslim faith leaders,”. Guenter continued saying “I fundamentally believe their priorities are misaligned with where Manitobans are at today”.

In 2021, Guenter wrote an open letter to then Premier Brian Pallister outlining his opposition to the recently introduced vaccine mandate, saying "I've always had my red-lines, and this vaccine mandate is my red-line. I believe that a vaccine mandate runs counter to our most basic principles of civil liberties in the country. I don't think it's fair, moral, legal or right or acceptable under any circumstances to require people to accept into their body a substance they do not want."

In January 2022, Guenter was stripped of his legislative roles by Premier Heather Stefanson for supporting the Freedom Convoy protests.

In 2024, Guenter was criticized for a Facebook post responding to a fatal highway collision near Altona. In the post, he highlighted that the driver involved lived in Brampton, Ontario, and suggested that if the driver was not a Canadian citizen, he should be deported. He also linked the incident to what he described as the trucking industry’s reliance on “cheap foreign labour.”

The comments prompted backlash from community members and social‑media users, who accused Guenter of promoting racist and xenophobic narratives. Critics argued that the emphasis on the driver’s city of residence and the call to “send them back” echoed anti‑immigrant rhetoric. Guenter clarified his comments, stating that his intention had been to raise concerns about road safety and industry standards rather than target any individual or group.

In May 2026, Guenter faced criticism after referring to Saskatchewan farmer Gerald Stanley—who fatally shot Colten Boushie, a 22‑year‑old Cree man in 2016—as a “victim.” Guenter made the remark during debate on a resolution he put forward in the Manitoba Legislature concerning property owners’ rights to defend their homes. Members of the governing New Democratic Party condemned the comment, arguing that it minimized the death of an Indigenous man and risked inflaming racial tensions.

Premier Wab Kinew publicly urged Guenter to apologize, calling the statement “hateful and divisive.” Guenter declined, stating that “anytime there’s a loss of life, it’s a tragedy” but that “Colten Boushie should not have been on that property”[https://www.cbc.ca/news/canada/manitoba/guenter-boushie-remarks-9.7207995] The incident drew national attention due to the longstanding controversy surrounding the Boushie case and broader concerns about systemic racism in Canada’s justice system.

== Personal life ==
Guenter was a long-haul truck driver. He is married with five children.

== Election results ==
2023 Manitoba general election: Borderland
| Party | Candidate | Votes | % | ±% | Expenditures |
|---|---|---|---|---|---|
| Progressive Conservative | Josh Guenter | 4,479 | 72.66 | +6.57 | $20,013.59 |
| New Democratic | Rick Derksen | 921 | 14.94 | +11.01 | $392.00 |
| Liberal | Loren Braul | 764 | 12.39 | -4.19 | $0.00 |
| Total valid votes/expense limit | | 6,164 | 99.64 | – | $47,807.00 |
| Total rejected and declined ballots | | 22 | 0.36 | – | |
| Turnout | | 6,186 | 50.45 | -11.41 | |
| Eligible voters | | 12,262 | | | |
| Progressive Conservative hold | | Swing | | -2.22 | |
Source(s) Source: Elections Manitoba

2019 Manitoba general election: Borderland
| Party | Candidate | Votes | % | ±% | Expenditures |
|---|---|---|---|---|---|
| Progressive Conservative | Josh Guenter | 4,886 | 66.09 | -13.2 | $26,537.26 |
| Liberal | Loren Braul | 1,226 | 16.58 | +1.7 | $17,222.73 |
| Independent | Cliff Graydon | 740 | 10.01 | – | $31,729.30 |
| New Democratic | Liz Cronk | 291 | 3.94 | +0.1 | $1,792.07 |
| Green | Ken Henry | 250 | 3.38 | +1.4 | $0.00 |
| Total valid votes | | 7,393 | – | | |
| Rejected | | 28 | – | | |
| Eligible voters / turnout | | 11,996 | 61.86 | | |
| Progressive Conservative hold | | Swing | | -7.4 | |
Source(s) Source: Manitoba. Chief Electoral Officer (2019). Statement of Votes for the 42nd Provincial General Election, September 10, 2019 (PDF) (Report). Winnipeg: Elections Manitoba. "Candidate Election Returns". Elections Manitoba.
