= Steve Derewianchuk =

Canadian politician (1935–2026)

Member of the Legislative Assembly of Manitoba for Emerson
- In office June 28, 1973 – October 11, 1977
- Preceded by: Gabriel Girard
- Succeeded by: Albert Driedger

Personal details
- Born: May 5, 1935 Vita, Manitoba, Canada
- Died: March 18, 2026 (aged 90) Vita, Manitoba, Canada

Stefan Derewianchuk (May 5, 1935 – March 18, 2026) was a Canadian politician in Manitoba. He served as a New Democratic member of the Legislative Assembly of Manitoba from 1973 to 1977, representing Emerson.

== Life and career ==
Derewianchuk played baseball as a catcher with the Vita Cubs, Tolstoi Jets, Winkler Royals and Rossburn. After he retired from baseball, he continued to play slow pitch and was a member of the winning Manitoba Fastball provincial champion team in the age 65+ category in 2000. Derewianchuk was named to the Manitoba Baseball Hall of Fame in 2007.

In the provincial election of 1973, he defeated Progressive Conservative candidate Garnet Kyle by 437 votes; a strong showing by Liberal Mark Smerchanski may have split the centre-right vote, and contributed to Derewianchuk's victory.

He was the first, and to date the only, candidate of the NDP to be elected in the rural, southeastern riding of Emerson. He does not appear to have played a major role in the legislature. His time in office was short-lived, as he was defeated by Tory candidate Albert Driedger in the 1977 election. He did not seek a return to provincial politics since this time.

Derewianchuk died in Vita, Manitoba on March 18, 2026, at the age of 90.
