= Municipality of Emerson-Franklin =

Rural municipality in Manitoba, Canada

Emerson – Franklin
- Rural municipality
- Municipality of Emerson – Franklin
- Location of Emerson – Franklin in Manitoba
- Coordinates: 49.142°N 97.152°W
- Country: Canada
- Province: Manitoba
- Region: Eastman (part); Pembina Valley (part)
- Incorporated (amalgamated): January 1, 2015

Area
  - Total: 973.05 km^{2} (375.70 sq mi)

Population (2016)
  - Total: 2,537
  - Density: 2.607/km^{2} (6.753/sq mi)
- Time zone: UTC-6 (CST)
  - Summer (DST): UTC-5 (CDT)
- Website: emersonfranklin.com

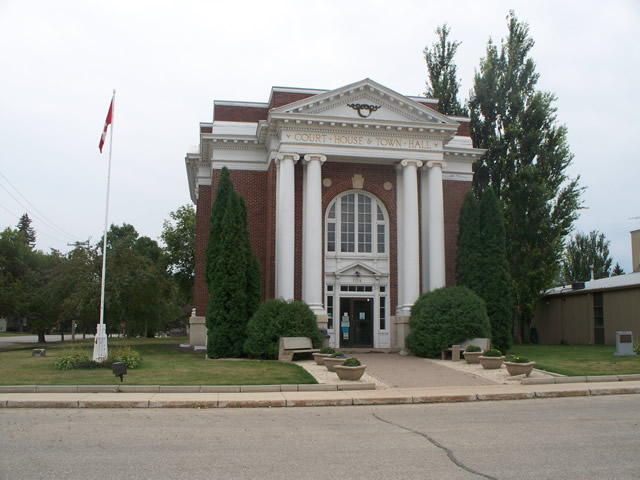
Emerson courthouse and former town hall, built in 1917.

The Municipality of Emerson – Franklin is a rural municipality (RM) in the Canadian province of Manitoba.

== History ==
The municipality was created on January 1, 2015 via the amalgamation of the RM of Franklin and the Town of Emerson. It was formed as a requirement of The Municipal Amalgamations Act, which required that municipalities with a population less than 1,000 amalgamate with one or more neighbouring municipalities by 2015. The Government of Manitoba initiated these amalgamations in order for municipalities to meet the 1997 minimum population requirement of 1,000 to incorporate a municipality. The Town of Emerson previously amalgamated with the town of West Lynne in 1883.

== Geography ==
Emerson – Franklin is bordered by three rural municipalities (De Salaberry to the north, Montcalm to the west, and Stuartburn to the east) and Roseau River Anishinabe First Nation. The municipality's southern boundary is the Canada–United States border. Pembina County in North Dakota and Kittson County in Minnesota share the border with Emerson – Franklin and are accessed via the Pembina–Emerson or Lancaster-Tolstoi border crossings.

The Red River of the North flows through the community of Emerson and forms most of the southern half of Emerson – Franklin's western boundary. Its tributary, the Roseau River, flows westward through the municipality before converging with the Red River at Ginew in Anishinabe First Nation territory. A small parcel of land encompassing the former town of West Lynne extends west of the Red River at Emerson, creating a four-kilometre shared boundary with North Dakota.

Most of the Emerson – Franklin is located within Manitoba's Eastman Region, except for the local urban district of Emerson, which is considered part of the Pembina Valley Region.

=== Communities ===
- Emerson (local urban district)
- Arnaud
- Carlowrie
- Dominion City
- Fredensthal
- Green Ridge
- Ridgeville
- Rosa
- Roseau River
- Senkiw
- Tolstoi
- Woodmore

== Demographics ==
In the 2021 Census of Population conducted by Statistics Canada, Emerson-Franklin had a population of 2,437 living in 917 of its 1,134 total private dwellings, a change of −3.9% from its 2016 population of 2,537. With a land area of 970.19 km^{2} (374.59 sq mi), it had a population density of 2.5/km^{2} (6.5/sq mi) in 2021.

== Attractions ==
Fort Dufferin, a former federal government post and immigration station, is a National Historic Site located at Emerson. Other historic buildings in the municipality include the All Saints Anglican Church in Dominion City, now the Franklin Museum, and the Emerson courthouse, which also served as the community's town hall prior to amalgamation.

== See also ==
- List of francophone communities in Manitoba
