= Jack Penner =

Canadian farmer and politician

Jack Penner MLA

Member of the Legislative Assembly of Manitoba for Emerson
- In office September 11, 1990 – May 22, 2007
- Preceded by: Albert Driedger
- Succeeded by: Cliff Graydon

Member of the Legislative Assembly of Manitoba for Rhineland
- In office April 26, 1988 – September 11, 1990
- Preceded by: Arnold Brown
- Succeeded by: riding abolished

Personal details
- Born: Halbstadt, Manitoba
- Party: Progressive Conservative Party of Manitoba
- Occupation: Farmer

Jack Penner is a farmer and former politician in Manitoba, Canada. He was a member of the Legislative Assembly of Manitoba from 1988 to 2007, and served in the cabinet of Progressive Conservative Premier Gary Filmon.

== Life and career ==
The son of Diedrich A. Penner, he was born in Halbstadt, Manitoba, and worked as a farmer both before and after entering politics. He has served as President of the Keystone Agricultural Producers, the Rhineland Pioneer Centre, and the Rhineland Agricultural Society along with other related organizations. Penner also worked for West Park Motors in Altona for 12 years.

Penner was first elected to the Manitoba legislature in the 1988 general election, in the rural riding of Rhineland in the province's southeastern region. He received 5,166 votes, against 1,059 for his closest opponent, Liberal Walter Hebert. Penner was subsequently returned for the riding of Emerson in the provincial elections of 1990, 1995, 1999 and 2003, each time by a significant margin. He reportedly considered running for the federal Progressive Conservative Party in 1996, but ultimately declined.

When Gary Filmon was sworn in as Premier on May 9, 1988, he made Penner his Minister of Natural Resources, with responsibility for the Natural Resources Development Act. On April 21, 1989, he was shifted to the Ministry of Rural Development. Penner was dropped from cabinet on February 5, 1991, and was not re-appointed thereafter.

Penner was an active spokesman for farmers affected by the BSE crisis, which kept the United States closed to Canadian beef. On May 19, 2004, he was the leading Progressive Conservative spokesman for an all-party parliamentary resolution on the issue.

He did not seek re-election in 2007.
