= Rural Municipality of Franklin =

Rural municipality in Manitoba, Canada

Coordinates: 49°08′00″N 97°01′59″W

The Rural Municipality of Franklin is a former rural municipality (RM) in the Canadian province of Manitoba. It was incorporated on December 22, 1883. It ceased on January 1, 2015 as a result of a provincially mandated amalgamation with the Town of Emerson to form the Municipality of Emerson – Franklin.

== Geography ==
The RM was located in the southeastern part of Manitoba, along the border between the province and the U.S. state of Minnesota. According to Statistics Canada, the former RM had an area of 953.34 km^{2} (368.09 sq mi).

== Population ==
The 2006 Census reported a population of 1,768 persons. Communities within the former RM include:

- Arnaud
- Carlowrie
- Dominion City
- Fredensthal
- Green Ridge
- Ridgeville
- Rosa
- Roseau River
- Senkiw
- Tolstoi
- Woodmore

=== Adjacent municipalities ===
- Rural Municipality of Montcalm - (west, northwest)
- Rural Municipality of De Salaberry - (north)
- Rural Municipality of Stuartburn - (east)
- Kittson County, Minnesota - (south)
- Emerson (town) - (southwest)*

== See also ==
- Manitoba municipal amalgamations, 2015
