= James Thomson (Manitoba politician) =

Canadian politician

James Thomson (July 15, 1854 – after 1892) was a Scottish-born miller and political figure in Manitoba. He represented Emerson from 1888 to 1892 in the Legislative Assembly of Manitoba as a Liberal.

He was born in St. Ninians, Stirlingshire, the son of Andrew Thomson, and came to Grey County, Canada West with his parents at a young age. Thomson was educated in Arran Township, Bruce County. He went west to Manitoba in 1879, where he was involved in the grain trade. In 1886, Thomson married Janet McKay. He was defeated when he ran for reelection to the Manitoba assembly in 1892.
