= Steinbach (electoral district) =

Provincial electoral district in Manitoba, Canada

Coordinates: 49.532°N 96.729°W

Manitoba electoral district

Provincial electoral district
- Legislature: Legislative Assembly of Manitoba
MLA
Kelvin Goertzen
Progressive Conservative
- District created: 1989
- First contested: 1990
- Last contested: 2023

Demographics
- Population (2016): 22,965
- Electors (2019): 14,623
- Area (km²): 201
- Pop. density (per km²): 114.3

Steinbach is a provincial electoral district of Manitoba, Canada, that encompasses the city of Steinbach, the riding's namesake, and northeastern part of the Rural Municipality of Hanover.

The current Legislative Assembly of Manitoba (MLA) is Kelvin Goertzen, who was first elected with almost 75% of the vote in 2003. Goertzen also briefly served as Premier of Manitoba in 2021.

== History ==
It was created by redistribution in 1989, and has formally existed since the provincial election of 1990. Originally a much larger riding in terms of geographical area, Steinbach has been redistributed three times (1999, 2011, and 2019) in response to the city of Steinbach's rapid population growth and is now among the smallest provincial ridings in terms of land area outside of Winnipeg.

The riding is currently bordered by the riding of Dawson Trail to the north and east, and La Verendrye to the south and west. Prior to the redistribution ahead of the 2019 election, the riding was bordered by the former Emerson riding to the west, La Verendrye to the south and east, Dawson Trail to the north, and former Morris riding to the west.

== Demographics ==
As of 2016, thirty-four per cent of the riding's residents list German as their ethnic origin, and a further 7% list themselves as Dutch. There is a very strong Mennonite presence in the riding. Steinbach's population in 2006 was 19,415. In the year 1999, the average family income was $46,133, and the unemployment rate was 5.00%. Manufacturing accounts for 17% of the riding's industry, followed by agriculture at 14%.

== Members of the Legislative Assembly ==
Assembly	Years	Member	Party
Riding created from La Verendrye and Emerson
35th	1990-1995	Albert Driedger	Progressive Conservative
36th	1995-1999	Albert Driedger	Progressive Conservative
37th	1999-2003	Jim Penner	Progressive Conservative
38th	2003-2007	Kelvin Goertzen	Progressive Conservative
39th	2007-2011	Kelvin Goertzen	Progressive Conservative
40th	2011-2016	Kelvin Goertzen	Progressive Conservative
41st	2016–2019	Kelvin Goertzen	Progressive Conservative
42nd	2019–2023	Kelvin Goertzen	Progressive Conservative
43rd	2023–present	Kelvin Goertzen	Progressive Conservative

== Electoral results ==
The riding has been held by the Progressive Conservative Party of Manitoba since its creation, and is considered extremely safe for that party. Steinbach's rural nature, as well as the city's religious background, gives the riding a strong social conservative tint. Manitoba political pundits often refer to Steinbach as a "yellow dog riding", as it is one of many rural ridings where it is often said in jest that the Tories could nominate a yellow dog and still win.

=== 1990 ===
1990 Manitoba general election
Party	Candidate	Votes	%
Progressive Conservative	Albert Driedger	5,540	75.64
Liberal	Cornelius Goertzen	1,171	15.99
New Democratic	Marcel Lagasse	483	6.59
Libertarian	Ken McAllister	130	1.77
Total valid votes		7,324	–
Rejected		19	–
Eligible voters / Turnout		12,725	57.71
Source(s) Source: Manitoba. Chief Electoral Officer (1999). Statement of Votes for the 37th Provincial General Election, September 21, 1999 (PDF) (Report). Winnipeg: Elections Manitoba.

=== 1995 ===
1995 Manitoba general election
Party	Candidate	Votes	%	±%
Progressive Conservative	Albert Driedger	5,975	74.99	-0.65
Liberal	Cornelius Goertzen	1,206	15.14	-0.85
New Democratic	Peter Hiebert	787	9.88	3.28
Total valid votes		7,968	–	–
Rejected		55	–	
Eligible voters / Turnout		13,710	58.52	0.81
Source(s) Source: Manitoba. Chief Electoral Officer (1999). Statement of Votes for the 37th Provincial General Election, September 21, 1999 (PDF) (Report). Winnipeg: Elections Manitoba.

=== 1999 ===
1999 Manitoba general election
Party	Candidate	Votes	%	±%	Expenditures
Progressive Conservative	Jim Penner	5,708	78.13	3.14	$27,412.91
New Democratic	Peter Hiebert	910	12.46	2.58	$21.00
Liberal	Rick Ginter	688	9.42	-5.72	$3,179.52
Total valid votes		7,306	–	–	
Rejected		48	–		
Eligible voters / turnout		12,787	57.51	-1.01	
Source(s) Source: Manitoba. Chief Electoral Officer (1999). Statement of Votes for the 37th Provincial General Election, September 21, 1999 (PDF) (Report). Winnipeg: Elections Manitoba.

=== 2003 ===
2003 Manitoba general election
Party	Candidate	Votes	%	±%	Expenditures
Progressive Conservative	Kelvin Goertzen	4,284	74.63	-3.49	$24,714.92
New Democratic	Bonnie Schmidt	875	15.24	2.79	$341.35
Liberal	Monica Guetre	455	7.93	-1.49	$3,465.33
Green	Connie Jantz	126	2.20	–	$74.58
Total valid votes		5,740	–	–	
Rejected		41	–		
Eligible voters / turnout		13,768	41.99	-15.52	
Source(s) Source: Manitoba. Chief Electoral Officer (2003). Statement of Votes for the 38th Provincial General Election, June 3, 2003 (PDF) (Report). Winnipeg: Elections Manitoba.

=== 2007 ===
2007 Manitoba general election
Party	Candidate	Votes	%	±%	Expenditures
Progressive Conservative	Kelvin Goertzen	6,144	82.98	8.35	$25,321.51
New Democratic	Rawle Squires	641	8.66	-6.59	$331.36
Liberal	Jonathan Thiessen	351	4.74	-3.19	$340.30
Green	Janine G. Gibson	268	3.62	1.42	$421.15
Total valid votes		7,404	–	–	
Rejected		25	–		
Eligible voters / turnout		14,863	49.98	7.99	
Source(s) Source: Manitoba. Chief Electoral Officer (2007). Statement of Votes for the 39th Provincial General Election, May 22, 2007 (PDF) (Report). Winnipeg: Elections Manitoba.

=== 2011 ===
2011 Manitoba general election
Party	Candidate	Votes	%	±%	Expenditures
Progressive Conservative	Kelvin Goertzen	5,469	85.49	2.51	$28,130.00
New Democratic	Dally Gutierrez	488	7.63	-1.03	$0.00
Liberal	Lee Fehler	440	6.88	2.14	$987.95
Total valid votes		6,397	–	–	
Rejected		26	–		
Eligible voters / turnout		12,934	49.66	-0.32	
Source(s) Source: Manitoba. Chief Electoral Officer (2011). Statement of Votes for the 40th Provincial General Election, October 4, 2011 (PDF) (Report). Winnipeg: Elections Manitoba. "Election Returns: 40th General Election". Elections Manitoba. 2011.

=== 2016 ===
2016 Manitoba general election
Party	Candidate	Votes	%	±%	Expenditures
Progressive Conservative	Kelvin Goertzen	6,982	89.17	3.68	$17,469.05
Liberal	Dakota Young-Brown	461	5.89	-0.99	$5.84
New Democratic	Kathleen McCallum	387	4.94	-2.69	$146.90
Total valid votes		7,830	–	–	
Rejected		87	–		
Eligible voters / turnout		15,310	51.71	2.05	
Source(s) Source: Manitoba. Chief Electoral Officer (2016). Statement of Votes for the 41st Provincial General Election, April 19, 2016 (PDF) (Report). Winnipeg: Elections Manitoba. "Election Returns: 41st General Election". Elections Manitoba. 2016.

=== 2019 ===
2019 Manitoba general election
Party	Candidate	Votes	%	±%	Expenditures
Progressive Conservative	Kelvin Goertzen	6,241	81.64	-7.53	$14,150.78
New Democratic	Robert Jessup	616	8.06	3.12	$612.56
Green	Janine Gibson	418	5.47	–	$0.00
Liberal	LeAmber Kensley	370	4.84	-1.05	$0.00
Total valid votes		7,645	–	–	
Rejected		31	–		
Eligible voters / turnout		14,623	52.49	0.78	
Source(s) Source: Manitoba. Chief Electoral Officer (2019). Statement of Votes for the 42nd Provincial General Election, September 10, 2019 (PDF) (Report). Winnipeg: Elections Manitoba. "Candidate Election Returns". Elections Manitoba. Elections Manitoba.

=== 2023 ===
2023 Manitoba general election
Party	Candidate	Votes	%	±%	Expenditures
Progressive Conservative	Kelvin Goertzen	5,868	74.37	-7.26	$20,976.32
New Democratic	Gord Meneer	1,221	15.48	+7.42	$1,145.76
Liberal	Cyndy Friesen	801	10.15	+5.31	$6,032.40
Total valid votes/expense limit		7,890	97.60	–	$65,660.00
Total rejected and declined ballots		194	2.40	–	
Turnout		8,084	48.14	-4.35	
Eligible voters		16,791			
Progressive Conservative hold		Swing		-7.34	
Source(s) Source: Elections Manitoba

== Previous boundaries ==
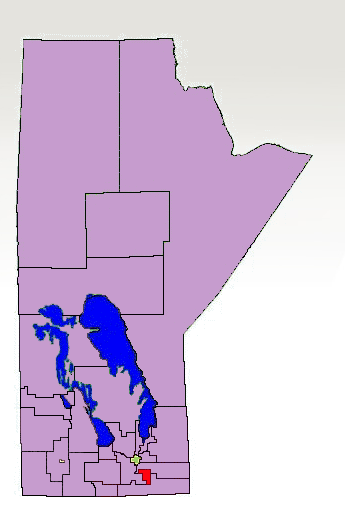
The 1999–2011 boundaries for Steinbach highlighted in red.

== See also ==
- List of Manitoba provincial electoral districts
- Canadian provincial electoral districts
