= Dmytro Yakimischak =

Canadian politician (1888–1958)

Dmytro Yakimischak (October 7, 1888 – 1958) was a politician in Manitoba, Canada. He served in the Legislative Assembly of Manitoba from 1920 to 1927.

Yakimischak was born in Ukraine, to a family of prosperous farmers. He was educated at public schools in Ukraine, and came in Canada in 1898. Yakimischak continued his education at the University of Manitoba, receiving Bachelor of Arts and law degrees. He served as director of the Ukrainian Publishing Company, Limited.

He was first elected to the Manitoba legislature in the 1920 provincial election as a Farmer candidate, defeating Conservative Roy Whitman and incumbent Liberal John D. Baskerville in the southeastern constituency of Emerson. He served in the Independent-Farmer bloc in the parliament which followed.

Yakimiscak was re-elected as an independent in the 1922 provincial election, winning by an increased majority. He was defeated in the 1927 campaign, however, finishing a distant fourth against Liberal-Progressive candidate Robert Curran.
