= Robert Hamilton (Northwest Territories politician) =

Canadian politician

Robert Hamilton (September 16, 1842 County of Argenteuil, Canada East – January 27, 1911 Saint Boniface, Manitoba) was a pioneer, politician and immigration agent. He served as an appointed member of the Council of the Northwest Territories from 1872 to 1876.
