= 1896 Manitoba general election =

- January 15, 1896

40 seats of the Legislative Assembly of Manitoba 21 seats needed for a majority
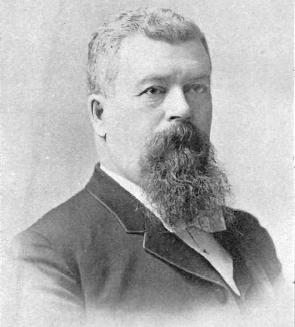

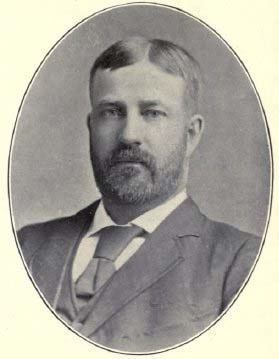
	First party	Second party
Leader	Thomas Greenway	Rodmond Roblin
Party	Liberal	Conservative
Leader since	1883	1889
Leader's seat	Mountain	Woodlands
Last election	28	11
Seats won	31	5
Seat change	▲3	▼6
Popular vote	49.7%	40.2%
Swing	▼0.5pp	▼1.1pp
Premier before election
Thomas Greenway
Liberal
Premier after election
Thomas Greenway
Liberal

The 1896 Manitoba general election was held on January 15, 1896. Thomas Greenway's Liberals were returned to power, winning 31 out of 40 seats.
