= Cliff Graydon =

Canadian politician

Member of the Legislative Assembly of Manitoba for Emerson
- In office May 22, 2007 – August 12, 2019
- Preceded by: Jack Penner
- Succeeded by: District abolished

Personal details
- Born: 1946 or 1947 (age 79–80) Arnaud, Manitoba, Canada
- Party: Independent (2018–2019); Progressive Conservative (2007–2018)
- Occupation: Farmer

Cliff Graydon is a farmer and former politician in Manitoba, Canada. He was a member of the Legislative Assembly of Manitoba from 2007 to 2019, representing the electoral division of Emerson.

Graydon was born in Arnaud, Manitoba and has farmed for 30 years, growing grain and raising cattle. Before entering politics, Graydon was a founding member of the Manitoba Cattle Producers Association and served on its board of directors. He has also served as a member of the Stuartburn Piney Agricultural Development Association and the Prairies East Sustainable Agricultural Initiative.

== Political career ==
After being elected in 2007, Graydon held various critic portfolios during his time in caucus, including: Manitoba Public Insurance; Liquor Control; Lotteries; Gaming; Agriculture; Entrepreneurship, Training and Trade; and Healthy Living and Seniors. Following his party's move from opposition to government after the 2016 provincial election, Graydon was Progressive Conservative caucus whip from 2016 to 2017.

Graydon underwent sensitivity training in early 2018 after posting on Twitter that asylum seekers in Canada are a "drain on society." He had previously retweeted a post about Prime Minister of Canada Justin Trudeau which asked "How can any woman vote for that SICK/RETARDED/TRAITOR?"

On October 22, 2018, Graydon was expelled from caucus following allegations of sexual harassment by two legislative staffers. Before his expulsion, Graydon had indicated he would take a medical leave of absence from the legislature, not seek reelection in the next provincial election, and undergo further sensitivity training.

Graydon held a news conference on November 8, 2018 in which he denied all allegations, stating: "I admit I’m guilty of having a bad sense of humour and sincerely apologize to those who have been offended by my inconsiderate jokes. I have grown up in a different era and realize some people today are much more sensitive to inappropriate humour." Graydon was subsequently accused of having groped and propositioned a party staffer for sex in September, 2017.

In July 2019, Graydon declared he would contest the upcoming provincial election as an independent in the new constituency of Borderland. The riding was created by the 2018 provincial redistribution out of parts of Emerson and Morden-Winkler. He finished in third place behind PC candidate Josh Guenter.

== Electoral results ==
2019 Manitoba general election: Borderland (electoral district)
Party	Candidate	Votes	%	±%	Expenditures
Progressive Conservative	Josh Guenter	4,886	66.09		
Liberal	Loren Braul	1,226	16.58		
Independent	Cliff Graydon	740	10.01		
New Democratic	Liz Cronk	291	3.94		
Green	Ken Henry	250	3.38		
Total valid votes		7,393	100.0		
Rejected & declined ballots		28			
Turnout		7,421			
Eligible voters		11,996			
Source: Elections Manitoba

2016 Manitoba general election: Emerson
Party	Candidate	Votes	%	±%
Progressive Conservative	Cliff Graydon	4,943	72.71	+0.73
Liberal	Loren Braul	1,423	20.93	+13.43
New Democratic	Alanna Jones	432	6.35	-13.25
Total valid votes		6,798	100.0	
Eligible voters		–		
Source: Elections Manitoba

2011 Manitoba general election: Emerson
Party	Candidate	Votes	%	±%	Expenditures
Progressive Conservative	Cliff Graydon	3,982	71.98	+12.42	$19,821.87
New Democratic	Lorie Fiddler	1,084	19.60	−2.33	$0.00
Liberal	Michelene Belliveau	415	7.50	−10.80	$0.00
Total valid votes		5,481			
Rejected and declined ballots		51			
Turnout		5,532	44.42		
Electors on the lists		12,453			
Source: Elections Manitoba

2007 Manitoba general election: Emerson
Party	Candidate	Votes	%	±%	Expenditures
Progressive Conservative	Cliff Graydon	3,635	59.56	+0.74	$22,391.66
New Democratic	Chris Murash	1,296	21.93	+2.87	$939.37
Liberal	Monica Guetre	1,117	18.30	−2.82	$6,183.77
Total valid votes		6,049	99.08		
Rejected and declined ballots		56			
Turnout		6,105	49.51		
Electors on the lists		12,330			
Source: Elections Manitoba
