= Kelvin Goertzen =

Premier of Manitoba in 2021

Kelvin Goertzen MLA
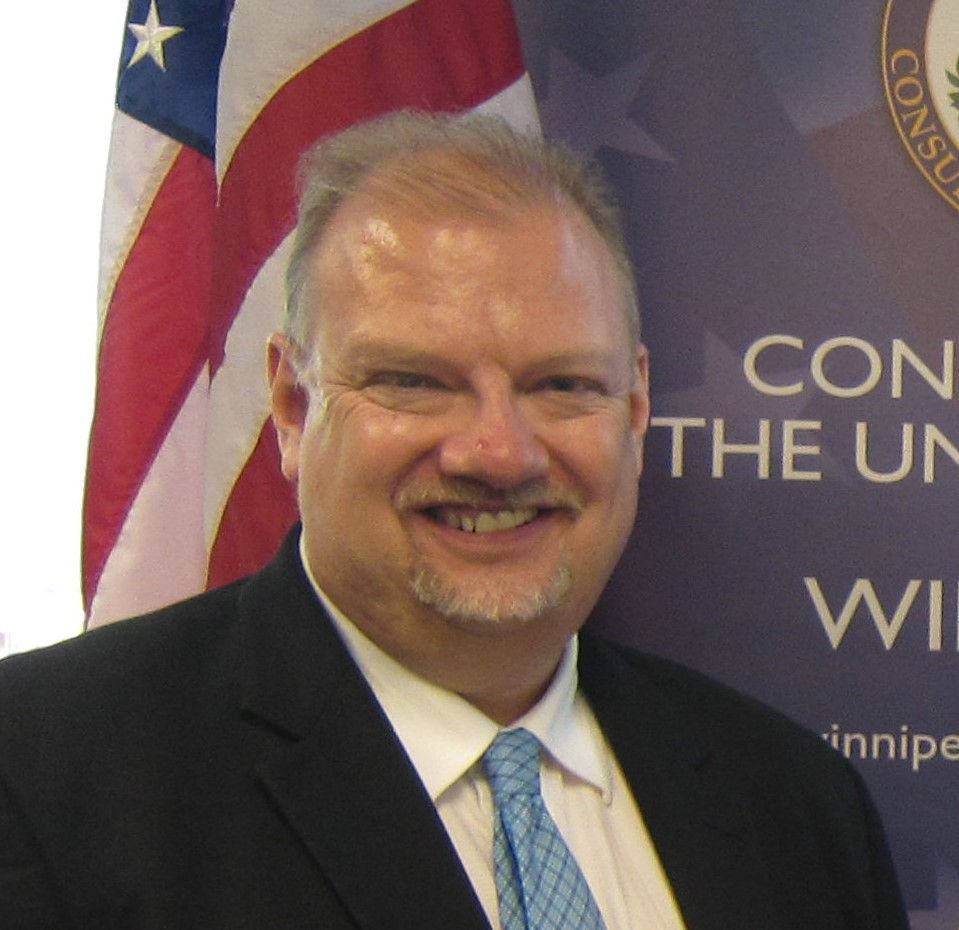
- Goertzen in 2014

23rd Premier of Manitoba
- In office September 1, 2021 – November 2, 2021
- Monarch: Elizabeth II
- Lieutenant Governor: Janice Filmon
- Deputy: Rochelle Squires
- Preceded by: Brian Pallister
- Succeeded by: Heather Stefanson

Interim Leader of the Progressive Conservative Party of Manitoba
- In office September 1, 2021 – October 30, 2021
- President: Tom Wiebe
- Preceded by: Brian Pallister
- Succeeded by: Heather Stefanson

8th Deputy Premier of Manitoba
- In office November 3, 2021 – January 18, 2022
- Premier: Heather Stefanson
- Preceded by: Rochelle Squires
- Succeeded by: Cliff Cullen
- In office January 5, 2021 – September 1, 2021
- Premier: Brian Pallister
- Preceded by: Heather Stefanson
- Succeeded by: Rochelle Squires

Minister of Intergovernmental Affairs and Internal Relations
- In office September 1, 2021 – November 2, 2021
- Premier: Kelvin Goertzen; Himself
- Preceded by: Brian Pallister
- Succeeded by: Heather Stefanson

Manitoba Minister of Justice and Attorney General
- In office January 18, 2022 – October 18, 2023
- Premier: Heather Stefanson
- Preceded by: Cliff Cullen
- Succeeded by: Matt Wiebe

Minister of Education
- In office October 23, 2019 – January 5, 2021
- Premier: Brian Pallister
- Preceded by: Portfolio renamed
- Succeeded by: Cliff Cullen

Minister of Education and Training
- In office August 1, 2018 – October 23, 2019
- Premier: Brian Pallister
- Preceded by: Ian Wishart
- Succeeded by: Wayne Ewasko As minister of advanced Education

Minister of Health, Seniors and Active Living
- In office May 3, 2016 – August 1, 2018
- Premier: Brian Pallister
- Preceded by: Sharon Blady
- Succeeded by: Cameron Friesen

Member of the Legislative Assembly of Manitoba for Steinbach
- Incumbent
- Assumed office June 3, 2003
- Preceded by: Jim Penner

Personal details
- Born: June 12, 1969 (age 57) Winnipeg, Manitoba, Canada
- Party: Progressive Conservative
- Spouse: Kimberley Hiebert (m. 1997)
- Children: 1
- Education: University of Manitoba (BA, BComm, LL.B.)

Kelvin Goertzen MLA (born June 12, 1969) is a Canadian politician who served as the 23rd premier of Manitoba from September to November, 2021. A member of the Progressive Conservative Party of Manitoba, he is a member of the Legislative Assembly of Manitoba for Steinbach, first elected in the 2003 provincial election, and was re-elected in 2007, 2011, 2016, 2019 and most recently in 2023. Goertzen served as interim leader of the PC party, from September 1, 2021 to October 30, 2021. He was sworn as premier on September 1, 2021. Goertzen was succeeded as premier on the afternoon of November 2, 2021, by Heather Stefanson who won the PC leadership election on October 30. Goertzen, upon his swearing-in, selected Rochelle Squires as his deputy premier. Goertzen resumed his role as Deputy Premier of Manitoba on November 3, 2021. His final posts in the Stefanson Government were Government House Leader, Minister of Justice and Attorney General, and Minister responsible for Manitoba Public Insurance (MPI).

== Early life and education ==
Goertzen was born on June 12, 1969 in Winnipeg, Manitoba but was raised in Steinbach, Manitoba. He attended public school in Steinbach and graduated high school from the Steinbach Regional Secondary School in June 1987. Goertzen obtained a Bachelor of Arts, majoring in Economics, a Bachelor of Commerce and a Bachelor of Law each from the University of Manitoba. While attending Robson Hall law school at the University of Manitoba, Goertzen was awarded more than a dozen academic prizes and was the school's top student during his second year of law studies.

== Community involvement ==
Goertzen served for two years as the Vice-President of the Steinbach Arts Council and served as Vice-President of the Southeast Helping Hands Food Bank in Steinbach for seven years. He has been involved as a participant and fundraiser in a number of community related causes including the Mennonite Heritage Village Museum and the Steinbach Association for Community Living. He is a member of the South East Rotary Club.

In June 2007, Goertzen was awarded the "HOPE" medal by the Lions Club Foundation of Manitoba and Northwestern Ontario for his community service work helping those less fortunate in Manitoba. In 2012 he was awarded the Queen Elizabeth II Diamond Jubilee Medal in recognition of community service by Governor General of Canada David Johnson.

== Political involvement ==
Goertzen became involved in political activities while attending high school, serving as an early organizer for the Reform Party of Canada. In 1995, Goertzen was hired as an intern at the Manitoba Legislature serving with the Progressive Conservative Caucus. Following the internship, he served in the Manitoba Department of Culture, Heritage and Citizenship and subsequently worked as an Executive Assistant to MLAs Jim Penner and Albert Driedger. Following the 2000 federal election, Goertzen also worked as an advisor to Provencher Member of Parliament Vic Toews and was a key local organizer for Toews in the 2000, 2004 and 2006 federal elections. In 2003, he participated in a public protest against the legalization of same-sex marriage in Canada.

Prior to seeking elected office himself, Goertzen also served as the President of the Steinbach Progressive Conservative Association, as a Regional Director on the Board of the Manitoba Progressive Conservative Party and as a member of the Management Committee of the Manitoba Progressive Conservative Party.

== Elected office ==
One week prior to the calling of the 2003 provincial election, Steinbach MLA Jim Penner announced he had been diagnosed with pancreatic cancer and would not be seeking re-election. After the election was called a short nomination process occurred. Some critics suggested Goertzen's service as local association President gave him an advantage in the short nomination time frame. The sudden events had no impact on the election result, however. Steinbach is one of the Manitoba PCs' safest seats, and Goertzen was elected with over 74% of the popular vote despite the poor showing of PC candidates elsewhere in the province. Goertzen became the youngest MLA ever elected from Steinbach since its creation in 1990, as well as the first Manitoba Legislative Intern to be elected to the Manitoba Legislature.

After his election to the Manitoba Legislature, Goertzen was promoted to the shadow cabinet as Chief Justice Critic and in 2005 was also appointed Deputy House Leader. As Justice Critic, Goertzen called for increased police resources, stronger laws against organized crime, electronic monitoring of sex offenders and a drug treatment court to assist individuals addicted to drugs and alcohol. In 2005-2006, Goertzen held a series of informational meetings across Manitoba about Crystal Meth and lobbied for new legislation to allow parents of drug addicted teenagers to place their children in drug treatment. The NDP government accepted that suggestion and legislation was passed June 13, 2006.

Goertzen was a strong supporter of Opposition Leader Stuart Murray and refused to participate in internal Caucus dissent that ultimately led to the end of Murray's leadership in November 2005.

Goertzen was among the first MLAs to endorse the provincial PC leadership campaign of Hugh McFadyen who eventually won the leadership. McFadyen reappointed Goertzen as Justice Critic after his leadership election and also appointed him the PC House Leader. Goertzen was again nominated the provincial PC candidate for Steinbach on September 8, 2006. On May 22, 2007 Goertzen was re-elected with 83% of the vote, the largest victory in the history of the riding.

In February 2010, Goertzen was named Deputy Leader of the Progressive Conservative Party of Manitoba, and hence Deputy Leader of the Opposition. On October 4, 2011, Goertzen was re-elected in Steinbach by another large majority, although the PC's once again lost the election to the NDP. With the resignation of McFayden as party leader after the election, there was some speculation in the local media that Goertzen may be a candidate for the position.

Following the 2011 election and selection of Brian Pallister as leader of the Manitoba Progressive Conservative Party, Goertzen was again appointed House Leader and Justice Critic for the PC Caucus. In 2013 he led a filibuster in the Manitoba Legislature to protest the increase of the provincial sales tax (PST) by the NDP government.

In 2013, despite widespread media speculation, he declined to run for the Conservative Party of Canada in the federal riding of Provencher, centered on Steinbach, following the resignation of MP Vic Toews.

Following the Progressive Conservative victory in the 2016 provincial election, newly-elected premier Pallister named Goertzen as a member of the new cabinet, assigning him the office of Health, Seniors and Active Living.

In May 2018, Goertzen was strongly criticized for speaking at an anti-abortion rally in Steinbach, and for constant deferral of questions related to women's reproductive matters, including abortion, to Rochelle Squires, minister of the status of women.

In September 2020, Goertzen made a Facebook post emphasizing the right to refuse vaccination, which received widespread condemnation by the public and which many medical experts considered to be problematic coming from an education minister and previous health minister.

After his party's defeat in the 2023 election and the election of Obby Khan as leader of his party, Goertzen announced he would not seek re-election and resign from politics at the end of his current term. Goertzen remained active in the Manitoba Legislative Assembly during this time and performed a four hour long filibuster in an effort to prevent the passage of Bill 53, which included eliminating taxes on groceries.

== Personal life ==
Goertzen married his wife Kimberley Hiebert in 1997. They live in Steinbach, Manitoba and have one son.

Goertzen has published several articles related to law and politics including in the Asper Review of International Business and Trade Law (Volume 3- 2003) and Underneath the Golden Boy (Volume 3-2004). In November 2006, he published a book on the life of Jim Penner, his predecessor in the Legislature, entitled A Life Well Lived: The Story of Jim Penner and Penner Foods (National Library of Canada ISBN 0-9781405-0-8).

== Electoral record ==
2023 Manitoba general election: Steinbach
Party	Candidate	Votes	%	±%	Expenditures
Progressive Conservative	Kelvin Goertzen	5,868	74.37	-7.26	$20,976.32
New Democratic	Gord Meneer	1,221	15.48	+7.42	$1,145.76
Liberal	Cyndy Friesen	801	10.15	+5.31	$6,032.40
Total valid votes/expense limit		7,890	97.60	–	$65,660.00
Total rejected and declined ballots		194	2.40	–	
Turnout		8,084	48.14	-4.35	
Eligible voters		16,791			
Progressive Conservative hold		Swing		-7.34	
Source(s) Source: Elections Manitoba

2019 Manitoba general election: Steinbach
Party	Candidate	Votes	%	±%	Expenditures
Progressive Conservative	Kelvin Goertzen	6,241	81.64	-7.53	$14,150.78
New Democratic	Robert Jessup	616	8.06	3.12	$612.56
Green	Janine Gibson	418	5.47	–	$0.00
Liberal	LeAmber Kensley	370	4.84	-1.05	$0.00
Total valid votes		7,645	–	–	
Rejected		31	–		
Eligible voters / turnout		14,623	52.49	0.78	
Source(s) Source: Manitoba. Chief Electoral Officer (2019). Statement of Votes for the 42nd Provincial General Election, September 10, 2019 (PDF) (Report). Winnipeg: Elections Manitoba. "Candidate Election Returns". Elections Manitoba. Elections Manitoba.

2016 Manitoba general election: Steinbach
Party	Candidate	Votes	%	±%	Expenditures
Progressive Conservative	Kelvin Goertzen	6,982	89.17	3.68	$17,469.05
Liberal	Dakota Young-Brown	461	5.89	-0.99	$5.84
New Democratic	Kathleen McCallum	387	4.94	-2.69	$146.90
Total valid votes		7,830	–	–	
Rejected		87	–		
Eligible voters / turnout		15,310	51.71	2.05	
Source(s) Source: Manitoba. Chief Electoral Officer (2016). Statement of Votes for the 41st Provincial General Election, April 19, 2016 (PDF) (Report). Winnipeg: Elections Manitoba. "Election Returns: 41st General Election". Elections Manitoba. 2016.

2011 Manitoba general election: Steinbach
Party	Candidate	Votes	%	±%	Expenditures
Progressive Conservative	Kelvin Goertzen	5,469	85.49	2.51	$28,130.00
New Democratic	Dally Gutierrez	488	7.63	-1.03	$0.00
Liberal	Lee Fehler	440	6.88	2.14	$987.95
Total valid votes		6,397	–	–	
Rejected		26	–		
Eligible voters / turnout		12,934	49.66	-0.32	
Source(s) Source: Manitoba. Chief Electoral Officer (2011). Statement of Votes for the 40th Provincial General Election, October 4, 2011 (PDF) (Report). Winnipeg: Elections Manitoba. "Election Returns: 40th General Election". Elections Manitoba. 2011.

2007 Manitoba general election: Steinbach
Party	Candidate	Votes	%	±%	Expenditures
Progressive Conservative	Kelvin Goertzen	6,144	82.98	8.35	$25,321.51
New Democratic	Rawle Squires	641	8.66	-6.59	$331.36
Liberal	Jonathan Thiessen	351	4.74	-3.19	$340.30
Green	Janine G. Gibson	268	3.62	1.42	$421.15
Total valid votes		7,404	–	–	
Rejected		25	–		
Eligible voters / turnout		14,863	49.98	7.99	
Source(s) Source: Manitoba. Chief Electoral Officer (2007). Statement of Votes for the 39th Provincial General Election, May 22, 2007 (PDF) (Report). Winnipeg: Elections Manitoba.

2003 Manitoba general election: Steinbach
Party	Candidate	Votes	%	±%	Expenditures
Progressive Conservative	Kelvin Goertzen	4,284	74.63	-3.49	$24,714.92
New Democratic	Bonnie Schmidt	875	15.24	2.79	$341.35
Liberal	Monica Guetre	455	7.93	-1.49	$3,465.33
Green	Connie Jantz	126	2.20	–	$74.58
Total valid votes		5,740	–	–	
Rejected		41	–		
Eligible voters / turnout		13,768	41.99	-15.52	
Source(s) Source: Manitoba. Chief Electoral Officer (2003). Statement of Votes for the 38th Provincial General Election, June 3, 2003 (PDF) (Report). Winnipeg: Elections Manitoba.
