= Albert Driedger =

Canadian politician

Albert Driedger (January 18, 1936 – July 18, 2011) was a politician in Manitoba, Canada. He was a member of the Legislative Assembly of Manitoba from 1977 to 1999, and a cabinet minister in the government of Gary Filmon from 1988 to 1997.

== Early life, education, and early career ==
Driedger was born in Steinbach, Manitoba, and was educated at the University of Manitoba.

He returned to the Steinbach area after graduation, and worked as a real-estate broker and farmer.

In 1958, Driedger married Mary Penner.

Between 1967 and 1972, he served as reeve of the municipality of Hanover. He was also a director of the Elim Mennonite Church in Grunthal, Manitoba. On July 15, 1970, his frog Georges won the First International Frog Jumping Championship in St. Pierre-Jolys, Manitoba, as part of a series of festivities surrounding a royal visit.

== Political career ==
Driedger was first elected to the Manitoba Legislature in the provincial election of 1977 as a Progressive Conservative, defeating incumbent New Democrat Steve Derewianchuk by about 1,000 votes in the rural southeastern riding of Emerson. In his first term, he served as a backbench MLA supporting the Progressive Conservative government of Sterling Lyon.

The NDP defeated Lyon's government in the 1981 provincial election, although Driedger was able to retain Emerson by 356 votes over his NDP challenger Paul Dupuis. He was re-elected by a greater majority in the 1986 election, which the NDP won by a narrow margin.

In 1988, disgruntled NDP backbencher Jim Walding brought down his government and forced a new election. Driedger was again re-elected without difficulty, and was appointed Minister of Government Services and Minister of Highways and Transportation on May 9, 1988.

Following the redistribution of provincial electoral districts for the 1990 election, Driedger ran in the riding of Steinbach; he once again won without any difficulty. He lost his position as government services minister on February 5, 1991, and on September 10, 1993, was transferred from highways and transportation to the Ministry of Natural Resources. Once again, he experienced no difficulties in the 1995 provincial election. He supported Jean Charest's bid to lead the Progressive Conservative Party of Canada in 1993 (Winnipeg Free Press, 12 June 1993). Driedger was dropped from cabinet on January 6, 1997, and did not seek re-election in 1999.

== Post-political career ==
After leaving politics, he was chairman of the board for the Menno Home for the Aged in Grunthal.

== Death ==
Driedger died on July 18, 2011, at the age of 75, days after suffering a stroke.

== See also ==
- List of people from Manitoba
- List of University of Manitoba alumni
