= Emerson (electoral district) =

Defunct provincial electoral district in Manitoba, Canada

Coordinates: 49.097°N 97.249°W

Manitoba electoral district
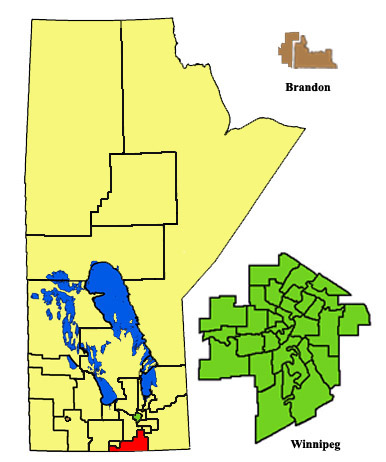

Defunct provincial electoral district
- Legislature: Legislative Assembly of Manitoba
- District created: 1879
- First contested: 1879
- Last contested: 2016

Emerson is a former provincial electoral district of Manitoba, Canada. It was created by redistribution in 1879 and eliminated prior the 2019 general election. Most of its territory was redistributed to the newly created Borderland riding. The eastern part of the former riding was transferred to the La Verendrye riding.

It was located in the southeastern corner of the province. It is bordered to the north by Carman, Morris, Steinbach and La Verendrye, to the west by Pembina, to the east by the province of Ontario and to the south by the American state of North Dakota. The riding included the communities/municipalities of Emerson, Altona, Dominion City, Rhineland, Gretna, Woodridge, and St. Jean Baptiste.

The riding's population in 2008 was 20,370. In 2011, the average family income was $61,951, and the unemployment rate was 2.9%. Agriculture accounted for 24% of the riding's industry, followed by manufacturing at 16%. Over 27% of Emerson's residents had less than a Grade Nine education. Emerson was an ethnically diverse riding, with only 51% of its residents listing English as their mother tongue. 26% of the riding's residents listed themselves as either German, French, Ukrainian, Polish or Mennonite, while a further 5% were aboriginal.

== Members of the Legislative Assembly ==
Name	Party	Took office	Left office
William Nash	Opposition/Conservative	1879	1880
Thomas Carney	Cons	1880	1883
Frederick Burnham	Lib	1883	1883
Charles Douglas	Cons	1883	1888
James Thomson	Lib	1888	1892
David McFadden	Cons	1892	1907
George Walton	Lib	1907	1910
David McFadden	Cons	1910	1915
John Baskerville	Lib	1915	1920
Dmytro Yakimischak	Farmer	1920	1922
	Independent	1922	1927
Robert Curran	Lib-Prog	1927	1932
	Lib-Prog	1932	1936
Herbert Wright	Independent/Liberal	1936	1941
John Solomon	Independent/Pro-Coalition	1941	1945
	Lib-Prog	1945	1953
	Independent Liberal-Progressive	1953	1957
John Tanchak	Lib-Prog	1957	1969
Gabriel Girard	PC	1969	1973
Steve Derewianchuk	NDP	1973	1977
Albert Driedger	PC	1977	1990
Jack Penner	PC	1990	2007
Cliff Graydon	PC	2007	2018
Cliff Graydon	Independent	2018	2019

== Electoral results ==
=== 1879 ===
1879 Manitoba general election
Party	Candidate	Votes	%
Conservative	William Nash	154	70.00
Undeclared	Isaac Casson	37	16.82
Undeclared	Frederick Ernest Burnham	29	13.18
Total valid votes		220	–
Rejected		N/A	–
Eligible voters / Turnout		220	–
Source(s) Source: Manitoba. Chief Electoral Officer (1999). Statement of Votes for the 37th Provincial General Election, September 21, 1999 (PDF) (Report). Winnipeg: Elections Manitoba.

=== 1880 by-election ===
Manitoba provincial by-election, 1880
Party	Candidate	Votes	%	±%
Unknown	Thomas Carney	179	68.32	–
Unknown	Alexander Waddell	83	31.68	–
Total valid votes		262	–	–
Rejected		N/A	–	
Eligible voters / Turnout		N/A	–	–
Source(s) Source: Manitoba. Chief Electoral Officer (1999). Statement of Votes for the 37th Provincial General Election, September 21, 1999 (PDF) (Report). Winnipeg: Elections Manitoba.

=== 1883 ===
1883 Manitoba general election
Party	Candidate	Votes	%	±%
Liberal	Frederick Ernest Burnham	178	51.45	–
Conservative	Robert S. Chalmers	168	48.55	–
Total valid votes		346	–	–
Rejected		N/A	–	
Eligible voters / Turnout		N/A	–	–
Source(s) Source: Manitoba. Chief Electoral Officer (1999). Statement of Votes for the 37th Provincial General Election, September 21, 1999 (PDF) (Report). Winnipeg: Elections Manitoba.

=== 1883 by-election ===
Manitoba provincial by-election, 1883
Party	Candidate	Votes	%	±%
Conservative	Charles Douglas	244	59.08	10.52
Liberal	Frederick Ernest Burnham	169	40.92	-10.52
Total valid votes		413	–	–
Rejected		N/A	–	
Eligible voters / Turnout		N/A	–	–
Source(s) Source: Manitoba. Chief Electoral Officer (1999). Statement of Votes for the 37th Provincial General Election, September 21, 1999 (PDF) (Report). Winnipeg: Elections Manitoba.

=== 1886 ===
1886 Manitoba general election
Party	Candidate	Votes	%	±%
Conservative	Charles Douglas	317	62.28	3.20
Liberal	Samuel Clarke Biggs	192	37.72	-3.20
Total valid votes		509	–	–
Rejected		N/A	–	
Eligible voters / Turnout		791	64.35	–
Source(s) Source: Manitoba. Chief Electoral Officer (1999). Statement of Votes for the 37th Provincial General Election, September 21, 1999 (PDF) (Report). Winnipeg: Elections Manitoba.

=== 1888 ===
1888 Manitoba general election
Party	Candidate	Votes	%	±%
Liberal	James Thomson	222	51.63	13.91
Conservative	Charles Douglas	208	48.37	-13.91
Total valid votes		430	–	–
Rejected		N/A	–	
Eligible voters / Turnout		N/A	–	–
Source(s) Source: Manitoba. Chief Electoral Officer (1999). Statement of Votes for the 37th Provincial General Election, September 21, 1999 (PDF) (Report). Winnipeg: Elections Manitoba.

=== 1892 ===
1892 Manitoba general election
Party	Candidate	Votes	%	±%
Conservative	David Henry McFadden	330	51.08	2.71
Liberal	James Thomson	316	48.92	-2.71
Total valid votes		646	–	–
Rejected		N/A	–	
Eligible voters / Turnout		752	85.90	–
Source(s) Source: Manitoba. Chief Electoral Officer (1999). Statement of Votes for the 37th Provincial General Election, September 21, 1999 (PDF) (Report). Winnipeg: Elections Manitoba.

=== 1896 ===
1896 Manitoba general election
Party	Candidate	Votes	%	±%
Conservative	David Henry McFadden	232	36.65	-14.43
Patrons of Industry	G. Ross	203	32.07	–
Liberal	George Christie	198	31.28	-17.64
Total valid votes		633	–	–
Rejected		N/A	–	
Eligible voters / Turnout		852	74.30	-11.61
Source(s) Source: Manitoba. Chief Electoral Officer (1999). Statement of Votes for the 37th Provincial General Election, September 21, 1999 (PDF) (Report). Winnipeg: Elections Manitoba.

=== 1899 ===
1899 Manitoba general election
Party	Candidate	Votes	%	±%
Conservative	David Henry McFadden	459	57.09	20.44
Liberal	Robert Hamilton	345	42.91	11.63
Total valid votes		804	–	–
Rejected		N/A	–	
Eligible voters / Turnout		926	86.83	12.53
Source(s) Source: Manitoba. Chief Electoral Officer (1999). Statement of Votes for the 37th Provincial General Election, September 21, 1999 (PDF) (Report). Winnipeg: Elections Manitoba.

=== 1900 by-election ===
Manitoba provincial by-election, 1900
Party	Candidate	Votes	%	±%
Government	David Henry McFadden	Acclaimed	–	–
Total valid votes			–	–
Rejected		N/A	–	
Eligible voters / Turnout		N/A	–	–
Source(s) Source: Manitoba. Chief Electoral Officer (1999). Statement of Votes for the 37th Provincial General Election, September 21, 1999 (PDF) (Report). Winnipeg: Elections Manitoba.

=== 1903 ===
1903 Manitoba general election
Party	Candidate	Votes	%	±%
Conservative	David Henry McFadden	436	46.88	–
Liberal	George Walton	417	44.84	–
Independent	William Redford Mulock	77	8.28	–
Total valid votes		930	–	–
Rejected		N/A	–	
Eligible voters / Turnout		1,013	91.81	–
Source(s) Source: Manitoba. Chief Electoral Officer (1999). Statement of Votes for the 37th Provincial General Election, September 21, 1999 (PDF) (Report). Winnipeg: Elections Manitoba.

=== 1907 ===
1907 Manitoba general election
Party	Candidate	Votes	%	±%
Liberal	George Walton	582	54.96	10.12
Conservative	David Henry McFadden	477	45.04	-1.84
Total valid votes		1,059	–	–
Rejected		N/A	–	
Eligible voters / Turnout		1,298	81.59	-10.22
Source(s) Source: Manitoba. Chief Electoral Officer (1999). Statement of Votes for the 37th Provincial General Election, September 21, 1999 (PDF) (Report). Winnipeg: Elections Manitoba.

=== 1910 ===
1910 Manitoba general election
Party	Candidate	Votes	%	±%
Conservative	David Henry McFadden	766	50.20	5.15
Liberal	George Walton	760	49.80	-5.15
Total valid votes		1,526	–	–
Rejected		N/A	–	
Eligible voters / Turnout		1,830	83.39	1.80
Source(s) Source: Manitoba. Chief Electoral Officer (1999). Statement of Votes for the 37th Provincial General Election, September 21, 1999 (PDF) (Report). Winnipeg: Elections Manitoba.

=== 1914 ===
1914 Manitoba general election
Party	Candidate	Votes	%	±%
Conservative	David Henry McFadden	1,032	51.14	0.94
Liberal	George Walton	986	48.86	-0.94
Total valid votes		2,018	–	–
Rejected		N/A	–	
Eligible voters / Turnout		2,415	83.56	0.17
Source(s) Source: Manitoba. Chief Electoral Officer (1999). Statement of Votes for the 37th Provincial General Election, September 21, 1999 (PDF) (Report). Winnipeg: Elections Manitoba.

=== 1915 ===
1915 Manitoba general election
Party	Candidate	Votes	%	±%
Liberal	John David Baskerville	1,181	71.97	23.11
Conservative	Garnet Coulter	460	28.03	-23.11
Total valid votes		1,641	–	–
Rejected		N/A	–	
Eligible voters / Turnout		2,535	64.73	-18.83
Source(s) Source: Manitoba. Chief Electoral Officer (1999). Statement of Votes for the 37th Provincial General Election, September 21, 1999 (PDF) (Report). Winnipeg: Elections Manitoba.

=== 1920 ===
1920 Manitoba general election
Party	Candidate	Votes	%	±%
Farmer	Dmytro Yakimischak	989	37.04	–
Conservative	Roy Whitman	925	34.64	6.61
Liberal	John David Baskerville	756	28.31	-43.65
Total valid votes		2,670	–	–
Rejected		N/A	–	
Eligible voters / Turnout		3,925	68.03	3.29
Source(s) Source: Manitoba. Chief Electoral Officer (1999). Statement of Votes for the 37th Provincial General Election, September 21, 1999 (PDF) (Report). Winnipeg: Elections Manitoba.

=== 1922 ===
1922 Manitoba general election
Party	Candidate	Votes	%	±%
Independent	Dmytro Yakimischak	998	38.89	1.85
Conservative	David Henry McFadden	567	22.10	-12.55
United Farmers	Robert Curran	566	22.06	–
Liberal	H. Stewart	435	16.95	-11.36
Total valid votes		2,566	–	–
Rejected		N/A	–	
Eligible voters / Turnout		4,178	61.42	-6.61
Source(s) Source: Manitoba. Chief Electoral Officer (1999). Statement of Votes for the 37th Provincial General Election, September 21, 1999 (PDF) (Report). Winnipeg: Elections Manitoba.

=== 1927 ===
1927 Manitoba general election
Party	Candidate	Votes	%	±%
Progressive	Robert Curran	975	31.63	11.57
Liberal	Herbert Wright	787	25.53	8.57
Independent	J. Kulackowsky	637	20.66	–
Independent	Dmytro Yakimischak	371	12.03	-26.86
Conservative	Roy Whitman	313	10.15	-11.94
Independent	P. Tanchuk	W/D	–	–
Total valid votes		3,083	–	–
Rejected		N/A	–	
Eligible voters / Turnout		4,248	72.58	11.16
Source(s) Source: Manitoba. Chief Electoral Officer (1999). Statement of Votes for the 37th Provincial General Election, September 21, 1999 (PDF) (Report). Winnipeg: Elections Manitoba.

=== 1932 ===
1932 Manitoba general election
Party	Candidate	Votes	%	±%
Liberal–Progressive	Robert Curran	2,028	46.35	14.72
Conservative	William Richard Johnston	1,788	40.87	30.72
Farmer–Labour	Wasyl "William" Kolodzinski	559	12.78	–
Total valid votes		4,375	–	–
Rejected		N/A	–	
Eligible voters / Turnout		5,826	75.09	2.52
Source(s) Source: Manitoba. Chief Electoral Officer (1999). Statement of Votes for the 37th Provincial General Election, September 21, 1999 (PDF) (Report). Winnipeg: Elections Manitoba.

=== 1936 ===
1936 Manitoba general election
Party	Candidate	Votes	%	±%
Independent	Herbert Wright	1,654	34.57	–
Liberal–Progressive	Robert Curran	1,634	34.15	-12.21
Independent	H. M. Podolsky	1,015	21.21	–
Social Credit	W. W. Wachna	482	10.07	–
Total valid votes		4,785	–	–
Rejected		153	–	
Eligible voters / Turnout		6,905	71.51	-3.58
Source(s) Source: Manitoba. Chief Electoral Officer (1999). Statement of Votes for the 37th Provincial General Election, September 21, 1999 (PDF) (Report). Winnipeg: Elections Manitoba.

=== 1941 ===
1941 Manitoba general election
Party	Candidate	Votes	%	±%
Independent	John R. Solomon	2,436	58.40	–
Liberal–Progressive	Herbert Wright	1,735	41.60	7.45
Total valid votes		4,171	–	–
Rejected		119	–	
Eligible voters / Turnout		7,079	60.60	-10.91
Source(s) Source: Manitoba. Chief Electoral Officer (1999). Statement of Votes for the 37th Provincial General Election, September 21, 1999 (PDF) (Report). Winnipeg: Elections Manitoba.

=== 1945 ===
1945 Manitoba general election
Party	Candidate	Votes	%	±%
Liberal–Progressive	John R. Solomon	2,039	52.43	10.83
Independent	Norman C. McLean	1,097	28.21	–
Co-operative Commonwealth	Peter Jacob Olchowecki	753	19.36	–
Total valid votes		3,889	–	–
Rejected		59	–	
Eligible voters / Turnout		6,439	61.31	0.71
Source(s) Source: Manitoba. Chief Electoral Officer (1999). Statement of Votes for the 37th Provincial General Election, September 21, 1999 (PDF) (Report). Winnipeg: Elections Manitoba.

=== 1949 ===
1949 Manitoba general election
Party	Candidate	Votes	%	±%
Liberal–Progressive	John R. Solomon	Acclaimed	–	–
Total valid votes			–	–
Rejected		N/A	–	
Eligible voters / Turnout		5,897	–	–
Source(s) Source: Manitoba. Chief Electoral Officer (1999). Statement of Votes for the 37th Provincial General Election, September 21, 1999 (PDF) (Report). Winnipeg: Elections Manitoba.

=== 1953 ===
1953 Manitoba general election
Party	Candidate	Votes	%	±%
Independent Liberal	John R. Solomon	2,355	48.97	–
Liberal–Progressive	Frank Casper	2,234	46.45	–
Social Credit	George J. Friesen	220	4.57	–
Total valid votes		4,809	–	–
Rejected		93	–	
Eligible voters / Turnout		5,752	85.22	–
Source(s) Source: Manitoba. Chief Electoral Officer (1999). Statement of Votes for the 37th Provincial General Election, September 21, 1999 (PDF) (Report). Winnipeg: Elections Manitoba.

=== 1957 by-election ===
Manitoba provincial by-election, November 14, 1957 John R. Solomon appointed to Court of Queen's Bench of Manitoba
Party	Candidate	Votes	%	±%
Liberal–Progressive	John Tanchak	2,092	51.94	5.48
Progressive Conservative	Frank Casper	1,936	48.06	–
Total valid votes		4,028	–	–
Rejected		N/A	–	
Eligible voters / Turnout		N/A	–	–
Source(s) Source: Manitoba. Chief Electoral Officer (1999). Statement of Votes for the 37th Provincial General Election, September 21, 1999 (PDF) (Report). Winnipeg: Elections Manitoba.

=== 1958 ===
1958 Manitoba general election
Party	Candidate	Votes	%	±%
Liberal–Progressive	John Tanchak	2,897	57.77	5.83
Progressive Conservative	Frank Casper	1,918	38.25	-9.82
Independent	Joseph Lambert	200	3.99	–
Total valid votes		5,015	–	–
Rejected		16	–	
Eligible voters / Turnout		6,292	79.96	–
Source(s) Source: Manitoba. Chief Electoral Officer (1999). Statement of Votes for the 37th Provincial General Election, September 21, 1999 (PDF) (Report). Winnipeg: Elections Manitoba.

=== 1959 ===
1959 Manitoba general election
Party	Candidate	Votes	%	±%
Liberal–Progressive	John Tanchak	2,752	55.69	-2.08
Progressive Conservative	Ben Comeaux	2,190	44.31	6.07
Total valid votes		4,942	–	–
Rejected		26	–	
Eligible voters / Turnout		6,153	80.74	0.78
Source(s) Source: Manitoba. Chief Electoral Officer (1999). Statement of Votes for the 37th Provincial General Election, September 21, 1999 (PDF) (Report). Winnipeg: Elections Manitoba.

=== 1962 ===
1962 Manitoba general election
Party	Candidate	Votes	%	±%
Liberal	John Tanchak	2,545	56.44	0.72
Progressive Conservative	Michael Sokolyk	1,964	43.56	-0.76
Total valid votes		4,509	–	–
Rejected		67	–	
Eligible voters / Turnout		5,915	77.36	-3.38
Source(s) Source: Manitoba. Chief Electoral Officer (1999). Statement of Votes for the 37th Provincial General Election, September 21, 1999 (PDF) (Report). Winnipeg: Elections Manitoba.

=== 1966 ===
1966 Manitoba general election
Party	Candidate	Votes	%	±%
Liberal	John Tanchak	2,180	51.97	-4.48
Progressive Conservative	Gabriel Girard	2,015	48.03	4.48
Total valid votes		4,195	–	–
Rejected		37	–	
Eligible voters / Turnout		5,547	76.29	-1.07
Source(s) Source: Manitoba. Chief Electoral Officer (1999). Statement of Votes for the 37th Provincial General Election, September 21, 1999 (PDF) (Report). Winnipeg: Elections Manitoba.

=== 1969 ===
1969 Manitoba general election
Party	Candidate	Votes	%	±%
Progressive Conservative	Gabriel Girard	2,467	45.58	-2.46
Liberal	John Tanchak	2,014	37.21	-14.76
New Democratic	Stephen Zaretski	695	12.84	–
Social Credit	Jacob Wall	237	4.38	–
Total valid votes		5,413	–	–
Rejected		26	–	
Eligible voters / Turnout		7,545	72.09	-4.21
Source(s) Source: Manitoba. Chief Electoral Officer (1999). Statement of Votes for the 37th Provincial General Election, September 21, 1999 (PDF) (Report). Winnipeg: Elections Manitoba.

=== 1973 ===
1973 Manitoba general election
Party	Candidate	Votes	%	±%
New Democratic	Steve Derewianchuk	2,374	38.53	25.69
Progressive Conservative	Garnet Kyle	1,937	31.43	-14.14
Liberal	Mark Smerchanski	1,768	28.69	-8.51
Independent	Walter Hoover	83	1.35	–
Total valid votes		6,162	–	–
Rejected		29	–	
Eligible voters / Turnout		8,255	75.00	2.91
Source(s) Source: Manitoba. Chief Electoral Officer (1999). Statement of Votes for the 37th Provincial General Election, September 21, 1999 (PDF) (Report). Winnipeg: Elections Manitoba.

=== 1977 ===
1977 Manitoba general election
Party	Candidate	Votes	%	±%
Progressive Conservative	Albert Driedger	3,125	46.52	15.09
New Democratic	Steve Derewianchuk	2,153	32.05	-6.47
Liberal	Gabriel Catellier	1,439	21.42	-7.27
Total valid votes		6,717	–	–
Rejected		2	–	
Eligible voters / Turnout		8,646	77.71	2.72
Source(s) Source: Manitoba. Chief Electoral Officer (1999). Statement of Votes for the 37th Provincial General Election, September 21, 1999 (PDF) (Report). Winnipeg: Elections Manitoba.

=== 1981 ===
1981 Manitoba general election
Party	Candidate	Votes	%	±%
Progressive Conservative	Albert Driedger	4,376	49.61	3.09
New Democratic	Paul Dupuis	4,020	45.58	13.53
Liberal	Steven Zaretski	308	3.49	-17.93
Progressive	Jack Thiessen	116	1.32	–
Total valid votes		8,820	–	–
Rejected		31	–	
Eligible voters / Turnout		11,860	74.63	-3.08
Source(s) Source: Manitoba. Chief Electoral Officer (1999). Statement of Votes for the 37th Provincial General Election, September 21, 1999 (PDF) (Report). Winnipeg: Elections Manitoba.

=== 1986 ===
1986 Manitoba general election
Party	Candidate	Votes	%	±%
Progressive Conservative	Albert Driedger	4,758	51.75	2.14
New Democratic	Ron Buzahora	3,780	41.11	-4.46
Liberal	Joe Antoshkiw	656	7.14	3.64
Total valid votes		9,194	–	–
Rejected		8	–	
Eligible voters / Turnout		12,607	72.99	-1.64
Source(s) Source: Manitoba. Chief Electoral Officer (1999). Statement of Votes for the 37th Provincial General Election, September 21, 1999 (PDF) (Report). Winnipeg: Elections Manitoba.

=== 1988 ===
1988 Manitoba general election
Party	Candidate	Votes	%	±%
Progressive Conservative	Albert Driedger	5,027	53.39	1.64
Liberal	Martin Stadler	2,615	27.77	20.64
New Democratic	Kurt Penner	1,407	14.94	-26.17
Confederation of Regions	Jake Wall	366	3.89	–
Total valid votes		9,415	–	–
Rejected		17	–	
Eligible voters / Turnout		13,035	72.36	-0.63
Source(s) Source: Manitoba. Chief Electoral Officer (1999). Statement of Votes for the 37th Provincial General Election, September 21, 1999 (PDF) (Report). Winnipeg: Elections Manitoba.

=== 1990 ===
1990 Manitoba general election
Party	Candidate	Votes	%	±%
Progressive Conservative	Jack Penner	4,529	61.85	8.45
Liberal	Real Tetrault	1,739	23.75	-4.03
New Democratic	Georgine Spooner	1,055	14.41	-0.54
Total valid votes		7,323	–	–
Rejected		13	–	
Eligible voters / Turnout		11,912	61.58	-10.77
Source(s) Source: Manitoba. Chief Electoral Officer (1999). Statement of Votes for the 37th Provincial General Election, September 21, 1999 (PDF) (Report). Winnipeg: Elections Manitoba.

=== 1995 ===
1995 Manitoba general election
Party	Candidate	Votes	%	±%
Progressive Conservative	Jack Penner	4,965	62.90	1.06
Liberal	Lorne Hamblin	1,983	25.12	1.38
New Democratic	Georgine Spooner	945	11.97	-2.43
Total valid votes		7,893	–	–
Rejected		21	–	
Eligible voters / Turnout		11,958	66.18	4.60
Source(s) Source: Manitoba. Chief Electoral Officer (1999). Statement of Votes for the 37th Provincial General Election, September 21, 1999 (PDF) (Report). Winnipeg: Elections Manitoba.

=== 1999 ===
1999 Manitoba general election
Party	Candidate	Votes	%	±%	Expenditures
Progressive Conservative	Jack Penner	3,994	54.12	-8.78	$27,307.39
Liberal	Ted Klassen	2,054	27.83	+2.71	$15,533.42
New Democratic	David Kiansky	1,332	18.05	+6.08	$4,971.00
Total valid votes		7,380	99.54		
Rejected and declined ballots		34			
Turnout		7,414	62.24		
Electors on the lists		11,912			
Source: Elections Manitoba

=== 2003 ===
2003 Manitoba general election
Party	Candidate	Votes	%	±%	Expenditures
Progressive Conservative	Jack Penner	3,509	58.82	+4.95	$17,612.69
Liberal	Len Schieman	1,260	21.12	-6.58	$13,304.08
New Democratic	Luc Gendreau	1,137	19.06	+1.09	$2,277.16
Total valid votes		5,936	100.00		
Rejected and declined ballots		30			
Turnout		5,936	48.54		
Electors on the lists		12,229			
Source: Elections Manitoba

=== 2007 ===
2007 Manitoba general election
Party	Candidate	Votes	%	±%	Expenditures
Progressive Conservative	Cliff Graydon	3,635	59.56	+0.74	$22,391.66
New Democratic	Chris Murash	1,296	21.93	+2.87	$939.37
Liberal	Monica Guetre	1,117	18.30	−2.82	$6,183.77
Total valid votes		6,049	99.08		
Rejected and declined ballots		56			
Turnout		6,105	49.51		
Electors on the lists		12,330			
Source: Elections Manitoba

=== 2011 ===
2011 Manitoba general election
Party	Candidate	Votes	%	±%	Expenditures
Progressive Conservative	Cliff Graydon	3,982	71.98	+12.42	$19,821.87
New Democratic	Lorie Fiddler	1,084	19.60	−2.33	$0.00
Liberal	Michelene Belliveau	415	7.50	−10.80	$0.00
Total valid votes		5,481			
Rejected and declined ballots		51			
Turnout		5,532	44.42		
Electors on the lists		12,453			
Source: Elections Manitoba

=== 2016 ===
2016 Manitoba general election
Party	Candidate	Votes	%	±%	Expenditures
Progressive Conservative	Cliff Graydon	4,943	72.71	+0.73	$29,628.39
Liberal	Loren Braul	1,423	20.93	+13.43	$9,401.72
New Democratic	Alanna Jones	432	6.35	-13.25	$2,226.47
Total valid votes/expense limit		6,798	99.00		$39,913.00
Total rejected and declined ballots		69	–	–	
Turnout		6,867	53.49	–	
Eligible voters		12,839			
Source: Elections Manitoba

== Previous boundaries ==
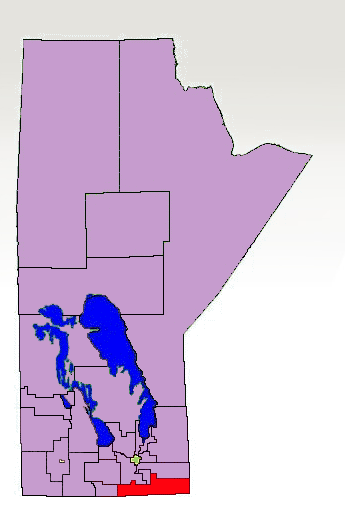
1998–2011 boundaries of Emerson highlighted in red.

== See also ==
- List of Manitoba provincial electoral districts
- Canadian provincial electoral districts
