= Emerson, Manitoba =

Emerson
- Local urban district
- Location of Emerson in Manitoba
- Coordinates: 49°00′25″N 97°12′53″W
- Country: Canada
- Province: Manitoba
- Region: Pembina Valley
- Rural municipality: Emerson – Franklin
- Incorporated: November 3, 1879
- Amalgamated: January 1, 2015

Government
  - MLA (Borderland): Josh Guenter (PC)
  - MP (Provencher): Ted Falk

Area
  - Total: 22.28 km^{2} (8.60 sq mi)
- Elevation: 242 m (795 ft)

Population (2006)
  - Total: 678
  - Density: 30.9/km^{2} (80/sq mi)
- Time zone: UTC−6 (CST)
  - Summer (DST): UTC−5 (CDT)
- Postal code: R0A 0L0
- Area codes: Area codes 204 and 431
- Website: emersonfranklin.com

Emerson is an unincorporated community recognized as a local urban district (LUD) in south central Manitoba, Canada, located within the Municipality of Emerson – Franklin. It has a population of 660 as of the 2021 Canada census.

== Location and transportation ==
Emerson is 96 kilometres south of Winnipeg along the Red River, just north of the United States border at the point where the province of Manitoba and states of Minnesota and North Dakota meet. Being in the far southwestern corner of municipality, the LUD shares borders with the Rural Municipality of Montcalm in Manitoba, Pembina County in North Dakota, and Kittson County in Minnesota. The towns of St. Vincent, Minnesota, and Pembina, North Dakota, are just a few kilometres south of the border in the United States. The unincorporated community of Noyes, Minnesota, lies immediately across the border from Emerson; however, the border crossing between the two is now closed.

The principal roads serving Emerson are Highway 75 and Provincial Road 200, which run north to Winnipeg along either side of the Red River. As of 2020 Highway 75 at Emerson was being redeveloped in order to accommodate expansion of the Emerson port of entry. As part of this project, Emerson's access to Highway 75 was moved 1.2 kilometres (0.7 miles) north of the former junction (removed in 2019).

=== Emerson port of entry ===
The border crossing at Emerson, Manitoba, and Pembina, North Dakota, is the fifth-busiest along the Canada–United States border, and the second-busiest west of the Great Lakes. It is part of a large trade corridor that links the Canadian prairies with the United States and Mexico. Annual cross-border trade is valued at over CA$14 billion. The ports of entry on both sides are open 24 hours and offer full border services. An estimated one million people pass through the border crossing each year.

For many years, Emerson was among very few communities in Canada to have multiple border crossings. It was serviced by the current port of entry, originally designated as West Lynne, and the now-closed Emerson East port of entry opposite Noyes, Minnesota. In its original configuration, Highway 75 ended at the Emerson East crossing, the busier of the two crossings during the early and mid parts of the 20th century, where it continued south as U.S. Route 75. Travellers wishing to enter North Dakota turned south onto a short road leading to the border (later designated Highway 29) which continued into North Dakota as U.S. Route 81. The importance of the Emerson East crossing declined after Interstate 29 superseded U.S. 81 in 1957 and subsequent realignment of Highways 75 and 29 to serve the West Lynne–Pembina crossing. Dwindling use of the Emerson East port of entry prompted the Canadian government to close the border station in June 2003. The American government closed the Noyes port of entry three years later.

South of Emerson, the Canadian National (CN) and Canadian Pacific Kansas City (CPKC) railways cross the border. The CN line meets the BNSF Railway, and CPKC continues along the former Soo Line Railroad. There are customs inspection facilities for both lines on either side of the border.

After the passage of Donald Trump's Executive Order 13769 in 2017, Emerson saw a large influx of immigrants walking across the border to apply for asylum. Many of them found assistance with the Manitoba Interfaith Immigration Council. In 2018, Member of Parliament for the Liberal Party of Canada Pablo Rodriguez began a series of visits to immigrant communities, warning potential border crossers that those who do not qualify for refugee status could be returned to their countries of origin rather than the United States. A migrant family of four Indian nationals froze to death in January 2022 on the northern side of the US-Canada border.

== History ==
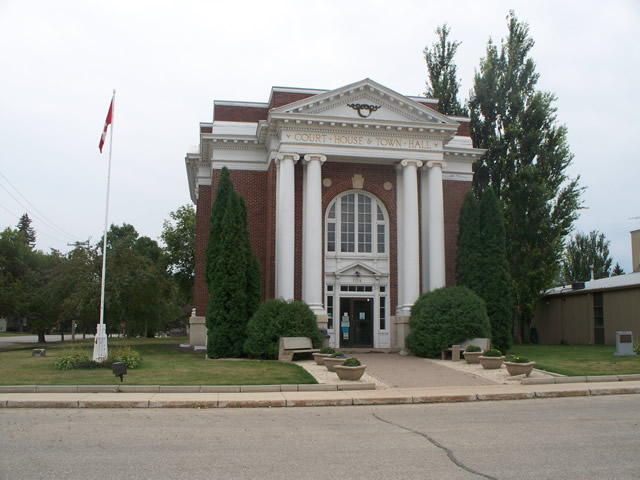
Courthouse and former town hall, built in 1917

In 1873, American businessmen Thomas Carney and William Fairbanks, following advice from railroad entrepreneur James J. Hill, received a grant from the province of Manitoba for 2.6 km^{2} (640 acres) along the east side of the Red River near the Canada–United States border. Hill had advised Carney and Fairbanks that the area had significant potential to become a railway hub for the region. The existing settlement of West Lynne on the west side of the river had already established itself as a key point along the trading routes between Winnipeg and St. Paul, Minnesota. With the emergence of railways during this time, the addition of their own railway would bring great economic prosperity.

In 1874, the two men led a group of 100 who formed the new settlement of Emerson, which was named after writer and poet Ralph Waldo Emerson. With the promise that Emerson could be the new "gateway to the west", the settlement grew quickly and, by 1876, a church and a school were built.

Manitoba's first railway, the Emerson Line, which ran along the east side of the Red River from St. Boniface to Emerson was completed in 1878. Soon after, the railway from St. Paul to St. Vincent, Minnesota, was completed, and the two lines were connected. The arrival of the railway to Emerson brought prosperity, and instantly elevated Emerson's status as one of Manitoba's most important settlements.

Emerson was originally incorporated as a town in 1879. Over the next four years, the community experienced a boom. Its population swelled to over 10,000 and in 1883, the community absorbed the neighbouring community of West Lynne. A court house, town hall, and other large, elaborate structures were erected as businesses thrived, thanks to immigrants and travellers from the east stopping in Emerson before embarking west. To help cement its status as "gateway to the west", the town negotiated with Canadian Pacific Railway to build a new railway west from Emerson. However, shortly after work on the line began, CPR reconsidered and the railway was never built.

Coupled with the completion of CPR's transcontinental railway through Winnipeg, the loss of the western railway ended the prospects of Emerson being the "gateway to the west", a title that would be bestowed upon Winnipeg. Businesses relocated to Winnipeg and travellers who would previously would have come to Manitoba through Emerson were now taking the new all-Canadian CPR route to Winnipeg and then west. By 1884, only ten years after the settlement was founded, the community was bankrupt. It would take the community years to recover. A fire destroyed the original town hall in 1917. A new town hall was built to replace it, with help from the Manitoba government. Many of the abandoned buildings were eventually destroyed by Red River floods, while others were removed to make way for the dike that was constructed around the community.

From around 1936 to 1956, Emerson obtained its power across the border from a long 2400-volt distribution circuit originating from Pembina. This line was initially operated by the Interstate Power Company and was sold to the Otter Tail Power Company in 1944. In 1956, the town made arrangements to obtain its electrical needs from Manitoba Hydro and the cross-border distribution line was removed.

On January 1, 2015, the town and neighbouring Rural Municipality of Franklin were amalgamated by direction of the provincial government to create the Municipality of Emerson-Franklin. Following the merger, the former Town of Emerson was designated as a local urban district within the new municipality and allotted two seats on the municipal council.

Today, Emerson has a population just under 700. The community still attracts many visitors each year who pass through the Port of Entry at Emerson. There are still some landmarks remaining from Emerson's "golden age", such as the courthouse, jail, and home of William Fairbanks, as well as the West Lynne post office and original customs house. The courthouse, which is designated as a historical landmark, is still in use today.

=== West Lynne ===
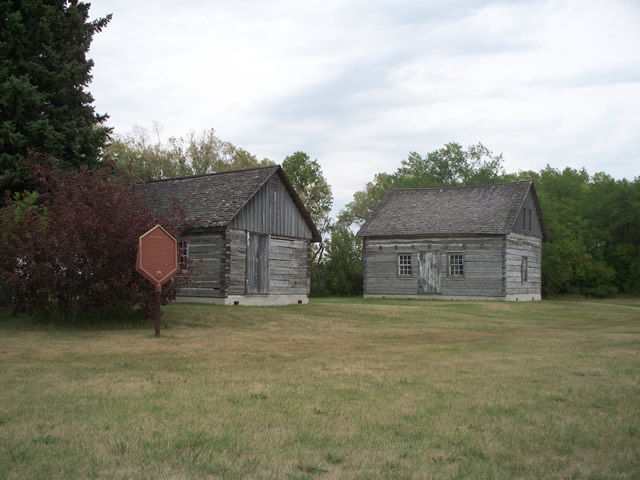
The original post office and customs house at West Lynne, built c. 1871

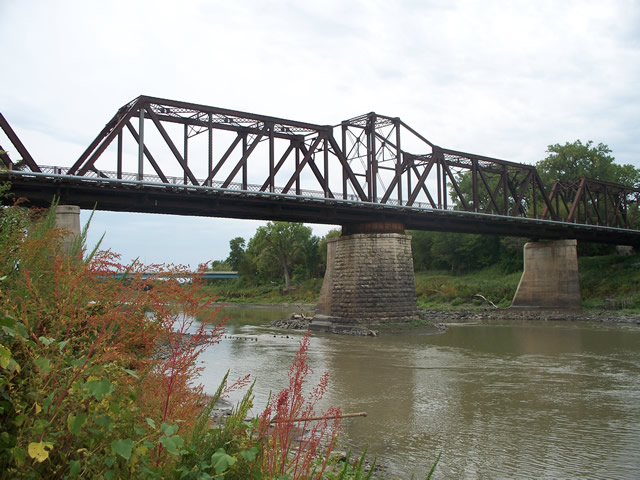
CN Railway bridge crossing the Red River at Emerson

West Lynne was established in the early 1870s by the Hudson's Bay Company, next to their North Pembina post, prior to which the company had operated a post at Fort Pembina two miles to the south, in American territory. After losing the fort in a Fenian raid in 1871, they withdrew and established the post inside Canadian territory.

A post office, telegraph station, and customs house were soon constructed at West Lynne, making it a key point along the Red River trade routes for both river and land traffic.

After the railway to Emerson was completed in 1878, the importance of West Lynne diminished. In 1883, West Lynne and Emerson were amalgamated into one municipality, retaining the name Emerson. The Canadian port of entry on the west side of the river was officially known as West Lynne to distinguish it from the Emerson East port on east side until the Canadian government closed Emerson East in 2003 to consolidate operations.

The original customs house and post office at West Lynne still stand about 200 metres from the modern facility used by the Canada Border Services Agency.

=== Fort Dufferin ===
The fort was on the west side of the Red River, approximately two kilometres north of West Lynne. It was established by the Government of Canada in 1872 as a base for their contingent of the North American Boundary Commission. The commission was tasked with defining and marking the Canada–U.S. border. It later served an immigration station and police post. By 1879, the Canadian government no longer had use for the fort and sold the property.

Fort Dufferin is best known as the starting point for the North-West Mounted Police's March West in 1874. This marked the only time the entire force was ever assembled at one place.

Today, the Fort Dufferin site is owned by the province of Manitoba. A cairn and plaque mark the historic site, which is open to the public during the summer.

== Demographics ==
In 1891, the town of Emerson had a population of 660. In the 2021 Census of Population conducted by Statistics Canada, Emerson had a population of 660 living in 294 of its 321 total private dwellings, a change of −2.7% from its 2016 population of 678. With a land area of 7.35 km^{2} (2.84 sq mi), it had a population density of 89.8/km^{2} (232.6/sq mi) in 2021.

== Government ==
Emerson is located at the far southwest corner of the federal riding of Provencher, which is represented by Ted Falk. At the provincial level, the community is represented by Josh Guenter, MLA for the Borderland riding.

== Community services ==
The community's education needs are served by Emerson Elementary School (Kindergarten to Grade 8) and Roseau Valley School (Grades 9–12) in nearby Dominion City. Recreational facilities include an indoor skating rink, curling rink, public golf course, swimming pool, and park. Emerson is also served by a local RCMP detachment and volunteer fire department.

== Climate ==
Emerson experiences a humid continental climate (Dfb), and a Plant Hardiness of zone 3b. Along with St. Albans, Emerson holds the record for Manitoba's highest temperature of 44.4 °C (112 °F) on 12 July 1936, during the 1936 North American heat wave. The coldest temperature ever recorded was −46.7 °C (−52 °F) on 9 February 1899. Emerson reached 37.2 °C (99 °F) on 27 April 1952, which is Canada’s highest recorded temperature in April.

Climate data for Emerson, 1981–2010 normals, extremes 1877–present
Month	Jan	Feb	Mar	Apr	May	Jun	Jul	Aug	Sep	Oct	Nov	Dec	Year
Record high °C (°F)	11.1 (52.0)	15.6 (60.1)	23.3 (73.9)	37.2 (99.0)	41.1 (106.0)	40.6 (105.1)	44.4 (111.9)	39.5 (103.1)	38.5 (101.3)	33.0 (91.4)	22.2 (72.0)	9.4 (48.9)	44.4 (111.9)
Mean daily maximum °C (°F)	−11.5 (11.3)	−7.6 (18.3)	−0.3 (31.5)	13.4 (56.1)	20.3 (68.5)	23.9 (75.0)	25.6 (78.1)	26.0 (78.8)	19.1 (66.4)	11.2 (52.2)	−1.4 (29.5)	−8.2 (17.2)	9.0 (48.2)
Daily mean °C (°F)	−16.3 (2.7)	−12.6 (9.3)	−5.2 (22.6)	4.9 (40.8)	13.1 (55.6)	17.5 (63.5)	19.5 (67.1)	19.2 (66.6)	12.9 (55.2)	5.7 (42.3)	−5.3 (22.5)	−12.5 (9.5)	2.6 (36.7)
Mean daily minimum °C (°F)	−21.1 (−6.0)	−17.5 (0.5)	−10 (14)	−1.5 (29.3)	5.8 (42.4)	11.1 (52.0)	13.3 (55.9)	12.4 (54.3)	6.7 (44.1)	0.2 (32.4)	−9.3 (15.3)	−16.8 (1.8)	−2.2 (28.0)
Record low °C (°F)	−44.4 (−47.9)	−46.7 (−52.1)	−38.9 (−38.0)	−26.1 (−15.0)	−10.6 (12.9)	−3.3 (26.1)	1.1 (34.0)	−1.1 (30.0)	−12.2 (10.0)	−21.1 (−6.0)	−40 (−40)	−40.6 (−41.1)	−46.7 (−52.1)
Average precipitation mm (inches)	26.9 (1.06)	21.2 (0.83)	24.7 (0.97)	28.5 (1.12)	58.4 (2.30)	90.2 (3.55)	94.1 (3.70)	74.1 (2.92)	57.5 (2.26)	46.7 (1.84)	36.7 (1.44)	32.8 (1.29)	591.6 (23.29)
Average rainfall mm (inches)	0.6 (0.02)	0.7 (0.03)	10.4 (0.41)	20.3 (0.80)	58.2 (2.29)	90.2 (3.55)	94.1 (3.70)	74.1 (2.92)	57.4 (2.26)	40.4 (1.59)	11.5 (0.45)	3.1 (0.12)	460.9 (18.15)
Average snowfall cm (inches)	26.2 (10.3)	20.5 (8.1)	14.3 (5.6)	8.9 (3.5)	0.3 (0.1)	0.0 (0.0)	0.0 (0.0)	0.0 (0.0)	0.1 (0.0)	6.3 (2.5)	25.3 (10.0)	29.7 (11.7)	131.6 (51.8)
Average precipitation days (≥ 0.2 mm)	11.4	9.0	8.9	5.9	9.6	11.6	11.4	9.2	9.2	9.6	9.7	11.0	116.5
Average rainy days (≥ 0.2 mm)	0.5	0.8	3.7	5.1	9.5	11.6	11.4	9.2	9.2	8.3	3.2	0.8	73.3
Average snowy days (≥ 0.2 cm)	11.1	8.5	6.8	2.3	0.31	0.0	0.0	0.0	0.06	1.7	7.9	10.5	49.2
Source: Environment Canada

== Media ==
- KGFE Channel 2 (PBS) Grand Forks, North Dakota
- CBWT Channel 6 (CBC) Winnipeg
- CKY Channel 7 (CTV) Winnipeg
- WDAZ Channel 8 (ABC) Grand Forks, North Dakota
- CKND Channel 9 (Global) Winnipeg
- KNRR Channel 12 (FOX) Pembina, North Dakota
- CIIT Channel 35 (Hope TV, religious) Winnipeg

== See also ==
- Emerson (electoral district)
- List of Canada–United States border crossings
- Noyes, Minnesota
- Pembina, North Dakota
