= 20th Manitoba Legislature =

The members of the 20th Manitoba Legislature were elected in the Manitoba general election held in July 1936. The legislature sat from February 18, 1937, to March 12, 1941.

The Liberal-Progressive Party led by John Bracken formed a minority government with the support of Social Credit members.

Errick Willis of the Conservatives was Leader of the Opposition.

Robert Hawkins served as speaker for the assembly.

There were five sessions of the 20th Legislature:

Session	Start	End
1st	February 18, 1937	April 17, 1937
2nd	December 9, 1937	March 23, 1938
3rd	February 20, 1939	April 17, 1939
4th	February 20, 1940	April 5, 1940
5th	November 18, 1940	December 17, 1940

William Johnston Tupper was Lieutenant Governor of Manitoba until November 1, 1940, when Roland Fairbairn McWilliams became lieutenant governor.

== Members of the Assembly ==
The following members were elected to the assembly in 1936:

Member	Electoral district	Party	First elected / previously elected	No.# of term(s)
John R. Pitt	Arthur	Liberal-Progressive	1935	2nd term
James Aiken	Assiniboia	ILP-CCF	1936	1st term
John Poole	Beautiful Plains	Conservative	1936	1st term
Francis Campbell Bell	Birtle	Liberal-Progressive	1936	1st term
George Dinsdale	Brandon City	Conservative	1932	2nd term
Edmond Prefontaine	Carillon	Liberal-Progressive	1935	2nd term
James Christie	Cypress	Liberal-Progressive	1932	2nd term
Robert Hawkins	Dauphin	Liberal-Progressive	1932	2nd term
Errick Willis	Deloraine	Conservative	1936	1st term
John Munn	Dufferin	Liberal-Progressive	1927	3rd term
Herbert Wright	Emerson	Independent Liberal	1936	1st term
William Lisowsky	Ethelbert	Social Credit	1936	1st term
Stuart Garson	Fairford	Liberal-Progressive	1927	3rd term
Nicholas Bachynsky	Fisher	Liberal-Progressive	1922	4th term
Stanley Fox	Gilbert Plains	Social Credit	1936	1st term
Joseph Wawrykow	Gimli	ILP-CCF	1936	1st term
William Morton	Gladstone	Liberal-Progressive	1927	3rd term
James Breakey	Glenwood	Liberal-Progressive	1914, 1922	6th term*
Norman Turnbull	Hamiota	Social Credit	1936	1st term
John Salmon Lamont	Iberville	Liberal-Progressive	1936	1st term
James McLenaghen	Kildonan and St. Andrews	Conservative	1927	3rd term
John Laughlin	Killarney	Conservative	1927, 1936	2nd term*
Douglas Lloyd Campbell	Lakeside	Liberal-Progressive	1922	4th term
Matthew Sutherland	Lansdowne	Liberal-Progressive	1936	1st term
Sauveur Marcoux	La Verendrye	Liberal-Progressive	1936	1st term
Hugh Morrison	Manitou	Conservative	1936	1st term
Earl Rutledge	Minnedosa	Conservative	1927	3rd term
Wallace C. Miller	Morden and Rhineland	Conservative	1936	1st term
William Clubb	Morris	Liberal-Progressive	1920	5th term
Ivan Schultz	Mountain	Liberal-Progressive	1930	3rd term
John Lawrie	Norfolk	Conservative	1936	1st term
Toby Sexsmith	Portage la Prairie	Conservative	1933	2nd term
Sydney Rogers	Roblin	Social Credit	1936	1st term
Mungo Lewis	Rockwood	Conservative	1936	1st term
Oddur Olafson	Rupertsland (Note: Election held August 22, 1936)	Independent Liberal	1936	1st term
Isaac Griffiths	Russell	Liberal-Progressive	1922	4th term
Harold Lawrence	St. Boniface	Independent Labour	1932	2nd term
Herbert Sulkers	St. Clements	Independent Labour	1936	1st term
Salome Halldorson	St. George	Social Credit	1936	1st term
Maurice Dane MacCarthy	Ste. Rose	Liberal-Progressive	1927	3rd term
Evelyn Shannon	Springfield	Liberal-Progressive	1936	1st term
George Renouf	Swan River	Conservative	1932	2nd term
John Bracken	The Pas (Note: Election held August 26, 1936)	Liberal-Progressive	1922	4th term
Alexander Welch	Turtle Mountain	Conservative	1929	3rd term
Robert Mooney	Virden	Liberal-Progressive	1922	4th term
James Alexander Barry	Winnipeg	Conservative	1936	1st term
Seymour Farmer	Winnipeg	Independent Labour	1922	4th term
Marcus Hyman	Winnipeg	Independent Labour	1932	2nd term
Huntly Ketchen	Winnipeg	Conservative	1932	2nd term
James Litterick	Winnipeg	Communist	1936	1st term
William Major	Winnipeg	Liberal-Progressive	1927	3rd term
John Stewart McDiarmid	Winnipeg	Liberal-Progressive	1932	2nd term
John Queen	Winnipeg	Independent Labour	1920	5th term
Lewis Stubbs	Winnipeg	Independent	1936	1st term
Ralph Webb	Winnipeg	Conservative	1932	2nd term

== By-elections ==
None.
