= 21st Manitoba Legislature =

The members of the 21st Manitoba Legislature were elected in the Manitoba general election held in April 1941. The legislature sat from December 9, 1941, to September 8, 1945.

A coalition government of all four legal political parties in the province was formed in December 1940. John Bracken served as Premier until 1943, when he entered federal politics. Stuart Garson succeeded Bracken as Premier.

There was no official opposition until the Co-operative Commonwealth Federation left the coalition in 1943 and Seymour Farmer became Leader of the Opposition.

Robert Hawkins served as speaker for the assembly.

There were five sessions of the 21st Legislature:

Session	Start	End
1st	December 9, 1941	March 31, 1942
2nd	February 2, 1943	March 17, 1943
3rd	February 8, 1944	April 6, 1944
4th	February 6, 1945	April 7, 1945
5th	September 4, 1945	September 8, 1945

Roland Fairbairn McWilliams was Lieutenant Governor of Manitoba.

== Members of the Assembly ==
The following members were elected to the assembly in 1941:

Member	Electoral district	Party	First elected / previously elected	No.# of term(s)	Notes
John R. Pitt	Arthur	Liberal-Progressive	1935	3rd term	
David Best	Assiniboia	Conservative Anti-coalition	1941	1st term	
John Poole	Beautiful Plains	Conservative Anti-coalition	1936	2nd term	
Francis Campbell Bell	Birtle	Liberal-Progressive	1936	2nd term	
George Dinsdale	Brandon City	Conservative/ Prog. Conservative	1932	3rd term	Died in office September 21, 1943
Dwight Johnson (1943)	Brandon City	CCF	1943	1st term	
Dwight Johnson (1943)	Brandon City	Independent CCF	1943	1st term	
Edmond Prefontaine	Carillon	Liberal-Progressive	1935	3rd term	
James Christie	Cypress	Liberal-Progressive	1932	3rd term	
Robert Hawkins	Dauphin	Liberal-Progressive	1932	3rd term	
Errick Willis	Deloraine	Conservative/ Prog. Conservative	1936	2nd term	
John Munn	Dufferin	Liberal-Progressive	1927	4th term	Died in office January 25, 1942
Earl Collins (1943)	Dufferin	Conservative/ Prog. Conservative	1943	1st term	
John R. Solomon	Emerson	Independent Coalition	1941	1st term	
Nicholas Hryhorczuk	Ethelbert	Liberal-Progressive	1920, (Note: First elected as an Independent Farmer) 1941	5th term*	
Stuart Garson	Fairford	Liberal-Progressive	1927	4th term	
Nicholas Bachynsky	Fisher	Liberal-Progressive	1922	5th term	
Stanley Fox	Gilbert Plains	Social Credit	1936	2nd term	
Joseph Wawrykow	Gimli	CCF	1936	2nd term	
William Morton	Gladstone	Liberal-Progressive	1927	4th term	
James Breakey	Glenwood	Liberal-Progressive	1914, 1922	7th term*	
Norman Turnbull	Hamiota	Social Credit	1936	2nd term	
Arthur Boivin	Iberville	Independent Coalition	1917, (Note: First elected as a Conservative) 1941	6th term*	
James McLenaghen	Kildonan and St. Andrews	Conservative/ Prog. Conservative	1927	4th term	
John Laughlin	Killarney	Conservative/ Prog. Conservative	1927, 1936	3rd term*	Died in office August 19, 1941
Abram Harrison (1943)	Killarney	Progressive Conservative	1943	1st term	
Douglas Lloyd Campbell	Lakeside	Liberal-Progressive	1922	5th term	
Matthew Sutherland	Lansdowne	Liberal-Progressive	1936	2nd term	
Sauveur Marcoux	La Verendrye	Liberal-Progressive	1936	2nd term	
Hugh Morrison	Manitou	Conservative/ Prog. Conservative	1936	2nd term	
Earl Rutledge	Minnedosa	Conservative/ Prog. Conservative	1927	4th term	
Wallace C. Miller	Morden and Rhineland	Conservative/ Prog. Conservative	1936	2nd term	
John C. Dryden	Morris	Independent Coalition	1941	1st term	
Ivan Schultz	Mountain	Liberal-Progressive	1930	4th term	
John Lawrie	Norfolk	Conservative/ Prog. Conservative	1936	2nd term	
Toby Sexsmith	Portage la Prairie	Conservative/ Prog. Conservative	1933	3rd term	Died in office August 23, 1943
Charles Greenlay (1943)	Portage la Prairie	Conservative/ Prog. Conservative	1943	1st term	
Sydney Rogers	Roblin	Social Credit	1936	2nd term	
Mungo Lewis	Rockwood	Independent Coalition	1936	2nd term	
Daniel Hamilton	Rupertsland	Liberal-Progressive	1941	1st term	
William Wilson	Russell	Liberal-Progressive	1915, 1941	3rd term*	
Austin Clarke	St. Boniface	Liberal-Progressive	1941	1st term	
Nicholas Stryk	St. Clements	Liberal-Progressive	1941	1st term	
Skuli Sigfusson	St. George	Liberal-Progressive	1914, 1922, 1941	5th term*	
Maurice Dane MacCarthy	Ste. Rose	Liberal-Progressive	1927	4th term	
Evelyn Shannon	Springfield	Liberal-Progressive	1936	2nd term	
George Renouf	Swan River	Conservative/ Prog. Conservative	1932	3rd term	
John Bracken	The Pas	Liberal-Progressive	1922	5th term	Resigned January 15, 1943
Beresford Richards (1943)	The Pas	CCF	1943	1st term	
Beresford Richards (1943)	The Pas	Independent CCF	1943	1st term	
Alexander Welch	Turtle Mountain	Conservative/ Prog. Conservative	1929	4th term	
Robert Mooney	Virden	Liberal-Progressive	1922	5th term	
Paul Bardal	Winnipeg	Liberal-Progressive	1941	1st term	
Seymour Farmer	Winnipeg	CCF	1922	5th term	
Morris Gray	Winnipeg	CCF	1941	1st term	
Bill Kardash	Winnipeg	Communist Anti-coalition	1941	1st term	
Huntly Ketchen	Winnipeg	Conservative/ Prog. Conservative Anti-coalition	1932	3rd term	
Stephen Krawchyk	Winnipeg	Independent Coalition	1941	1st term	
John Stewart McDiarmid	Winnipeg	Liberal-Progressive	1932	3rd term	
Charles Rhodes Smith	Winnipeg	Liberal-Progressive	1941	1st term	
Lewis Stubbs	Winnipeg	Independent Anti-coalition	1936	2nd term	
Gunnar Thorvaldson	Winnipeg	Conservative/ Prog. Conservative	1941	1st term	

== By-elections ==
By-elections were held to replace members for various reasons:

Electoral district	Member elected	Affiliation	Election date	Reason
Dufferin	Earl Collins	Conservative	June 22, 1943	J Munn died January 25, 1942
Killarney	Abram Harrison	Conservative	June 22, 1943	J Laughlin died August 19, 1941
The Pas	Beresford Richards	CCF	August 17, 1943	J Bracken resigned January 15, 1943
Brandon City	Dwight Johnson	CCF	November 18, 1943	G Dinsdale died September 21, 1943
Portage la Prairie	Charles Greenlay	Conservative	November 18, 1943	W Sexsmith died August 23, 1943
