= 22nd Manitoba Legislature =

The members of the 22nd Manitoba Legislature of Manitoba were elected in the Manitoba general election held in October 1945. The legislature sat from February 19, 1946, to September 29, 1949.

A coalition government of the Liberal-Progressive Party, the Progressive Conservative Party and the Social Credit League held a majority of seats in the assembly. Stuart Garson served as Premier until 1948, when he entered federal politics. Douglas Lloyd Campbell succeeded Garson as Premier.

Seymour Farmer of the Co-operative Commonwealth Federation was Leader of the Opposition. Farmer resigned as party leader in 1947 and was replaced by Edwin Hansford.

In 1948, the Labour Relations Act was passed. It was intended to protect both employers and employees, and established the Manitoba Labour Board to deal with labour disputes.

Robert Hawkins served as speaker for the assembly.

There were four sessions of the 22nd Legislature:

Session	Start	End
1st	February 19, 1946	April 13, 1946
2nd	February 25, 1947	April 16, 1947
3rd	February 10, 1948	April 22, 1948
4th	February 8, 1949	February 22, 1949

Roland Fairbairn McWilliams was Lieutenant Governor of Manitoba.

== Members of the Assembly ==
The following members were elected to the assembly in 1945:

Member	Electoral district	Party	First elected / previously elected	No.# of term(s)	Notes
John R. Pitt	Arthur	Liberal-Progressive	1935	4th term	
Ernest Draffin	Assiniboia	CCF	1945	1st term	
John Poole	Beautiful Plains	Progressive Conservative	1936	3rd term	
Francis Campbell Bell	Birtle	Liberal-Progressive	1936	3rd term	
Leslie McDorman	Brandon City	Liberal-Progressive	1945	1st term	
Edmond Prefontaine	Carillon	Liberal-Progressive	1935	4th term	
James Christie	Cypress	Liberal-Progressive	1932	4th term	
Robert Hawkins	Dauphin	Liberal-Progressive	1932	4th term	
James O. Argue	Deloraine	Progressive Conservative	1945	1st term	
Earl Collins	Dufferin	Independent Coalition	1943	2nd term	
John R. Solomon	Emerson	Liberal-Progressive	1941	2nd term	
Michael Sawchuk	Ethelbert	CCF	1945	1st term	
Stuart Garson	Fairford	Liberal-Progressive	1927	5th term	Resigned November 13, 1948
James Anderson (1948)	Fairford	Liberal-Progressive	1948	1st term	
Nicholas Bachynsky	Fisher	Liberal-Progressive	1922	6th term	
Stanley Fox	Gilbert Plains	Social Credit	1936	3rd term	
Steinn Thompson	Gimli	Liberal-Progressive	1945	1st term	
William Morton	Gladstone	Liberal-Progressive	1927	5th term	
Gilbert Grant	Glenwood	Liberal-Progressive	1945	1st term	
Norman Turnbull	Hamiota	Social Credit	1936	3rd term	
John McDowell	Iberville	Independent Coalition	1945	1st term	
James McLenaghen	Kildonan and St. Andrews	Progressive Conservative	1927	5th term	
Abram Harrison	Killarney	Progressive Conservative	1943	2nd term	
Douglas Lloyd Campbell	Lakeside	Liberal-Progressive	1922	6th term	
Matthew Sutherland	Lansdowne	Liberal-Progressive	1936	3rd term	
Sauveur Marcoux	La Verendrye	Liberal-Progressive	1936	3rd term	
Hugh Morrison	Manitou	Progressive Conservative	1936	3rd term	
Earl Rutledge	Minnedosa	Progressive Conservative	1936	3rd term	Resigned July 13, 1948
Henry Rungay (1948)	Minnedosa	Liberal-Progressive	1948	1st term	
Wallace C. Miller	Morden-Rhineland	Progressive Conservative	1936	3rd term	
John C. Dryden	Morris	Liberal-Progressive	1941	2nd term	
Ivan Schultz	Mountain	Liberal-Progressive	1930	5th term	
John Lawrie	Norfolk	Progressive Conservative	1936	3rd term	
Charles Greenlay	Portage la Prairie	Progressive Conservative	1943	2nd term	
Ronald Robertson	Roblin	Independent Coalition	1945	1st term	
William Campbell	Rockwood	Progressive Conservative	1945	1st term	
Daniel Hamilton	Rupertsland	Liberal-Progressive	1941	2nd term	
William Wilson	Russell	Liberal-Progressive	1915, 1941	4th term*	
Edwin Hansford	St. Boniface	CCF	1945	1st term	
Wilbert Doneleyko	St. Clements	CCF	1945	1st term	
Wilbert Doneleyko	St. Clements	Independent CCF	1945	1st term	
Christian Halldorson	St. George	Liberal-Progressive	1945	1st term	
Maurice Dane MacCarthy	Ste. Rose	Liberal-Progressive	1927	5th term	
George Olive	Springfield	CCF	1945	1st term	
George Renouf	Swan River	Progressive Conservative	1932	4th term	
Beresford Richards	The Pas	Independent CCF	1943	2nd term	
Beresford Richards	The Pas	CCF	1943	2nd term	
Beresford Richards	The Pas	Independent CCF	1943	2nd term	
Errick Willis	Turtle Mountain	Progressive Conservative	1936	3rd term	
Robert Mooney	Virden	Liberal-Progressive	1922	6th term	
Seymour Farmer	Winnipeg	CCF	1922	6th term	
Morris Gray	Winnipeg	CCF	1941	2nd term	
Bill Kardash	Winnipeg	Labor–Progressive	1941	2nd term	
John Stewart McDiarmid	Winnipeg	Liberal-Progressive	1932	4th term	
William Scraba	Winnipeg	Liberal-Progressive	1945	1st term	
Charles Rhodes Smith	Winnipeg	Liberal-Progressive	1941	2nd term	
Lloyd Stinson	Winnipeg	CCF	1945	1st term	
Lewis Stubbs	Winnipeg	Independent Anti-coalition	1936	3rd term	
Gunnar Thorvaldson	Winnipeg	Progressive Conservative	1941	2nd term	
Donovan Swailes	Winnipeg	CCF	1945	1st term	
Active Service Voters
Gordon Churchill	Army Service Representative	Independent	1946	1st term	
Alex J. Stringer	Navy Service Representative	Independent	1946	1st term	
Alex J. Stringer	Navy Service Representative	Progressive Conservative	1946	1st term	
Ronald Turner	Air Force Service Representative	Independent	1946	1st term	
Ronald Turner	Air Force Service Representative	Liberal-Progressive	1946	1st term	

== By-elections ==
By-elections were held to replace members for various reasons:

Electoral district	Member elected	Affiliation	Election date	Reason
Army Service Representative	Gordon Churchill	Independent	January 1946	Special armed forces seat
Navy Service Representative	Alex J. Stringer	Independent	January 1946	Special armed forces seat
Air Force Service Representative	Ronald Turner	Independent	January 1946	Special armed forces seat
Minnedosa	Henry Rungay	Liberal-Progressive	November 2, 1948	E Rutledge resigned July 13, 1948
Fairford	James Anderson	Liberal-Progressive	December 23, 1948	S Garson resigned November 13, 1948
