= John S. McDiarmid =

Canadian politician (1882–1965)

The Honourable John S. McDiarmid

14th Lieutenant Governor of Manitoba
- In office 1 August 1953 – 15 January 1960
- Monarch: Elizabeth II
- Governors General: Vincent Massey; Georges Vanier
- Premier: Douglas Lloyd Campbell; Duff Roblin
- Preceded by: Roland Fairbairn McWilliams
- Succeeded by: Errick Willis

Member of Parliament for Winnipeg South
- In office 14 September 1926 – 28 July 1930
- Preceded by: Robert Rogers
- Succeeded by: Robert Rogers

Member of the Legislative Assembly of Manitoba for Winnipeg
- In office 16 June 1932 – 10 November 1949 Serving with William Sanford Evans; Seymour Farmer, John Thomas Haig, Marcus Hyman, Huntly Ketchen, William Major, Ralph Maybank, William Ivens, John Queen, James A. Barry, James Litterick, Lewis Stubbs, Ralph Webb, Paul Bardal, Morris Gray, Bill Kardash, Stephen Krawchyk, Charles Rhodes Smith, Gunnar Thorvaldson, William Scraba, Lloyd Stinson, Donovan Swailes
- Preceded by: William Major; Edward W. Montgomery; John Thomas Haig; William Sanford Evans; William Tobias; Hugh Robson; Edith Rogers; John Queen; Seymour Farmer; William Ivens
- Succeeded by: District abolish

Member of the Legislative Assembly of Manitoba for Winnipeg South
- In office 10 November 1949 – 8 June 1953 Serving with Ronald Turner, Lloyd Stinson, Dufferin Roblin
- Preceded by: District abolished
- Succeeded by: Gurney Evans

Personal details
- Born: John Stewart McDiarmid; 25 December 1882 Perthshire, Scotland
- Died: 7 June 1965 (aged 82) Winnipeg, Manitoba, Canada
- Party: Liberal
- Other political affiliations: Liberal; Progressives
- Occupation: Lumber merchant
- Profession: Politician
- Cabinet: Provincial Lands Commissioner (1932-1936); Minister of Mines and Natural Resources (1932-1953); Provincial Secretary (1939)

John Stewart McDiarmid (25 December 1882 – 7 June 1965) was a Manitoba politician. He held senior ministerial positions in the governments of John Bracken, Stuart Garson and Douglas Campbell, and served as the province's 14th Lieutenant Governor between 1953 and 1960.

== Biography ==
McDiarmid was born in Perthshire, Scotland, and emigrated to Canada with his family in 1887. He was educated in Winnipeg, Manitoba, and hired by the Winnipeg Paint and Glass Co. upon its formation in 1902. He later worked his way up to president of the McDiarmid Brothers Lumber Company, which was also located in the city. In 1925, he was elected as an alderman on Winnipeg's municipal council. He represented the city's first ward, located in south Winnipeg.

The following year, McDiarmid was elected to the federal House of Commons as a Liberal, in the riding of Winnipeg South. He defeated his only opponent, Conservative Robert Rogers, by 8809 votes to 7638. For the next four years, he served in parliament as a backbench supporter of Prime Minister William Lyon Mackenzie King. He was defeated by Rogers in a 1930 rematch, 10117 votes to 9774.

On 27 May 1932, McDiarmid was appointed Provincial Lands Commissioner and Minister of Mines and Natural Resources in the government of provincial Premier John Bracken. This occurred after negotiations in which the provincial Liberal party merged with Bracken's governing Progressives; McDiarmid received one of the cabinet positions designated for the Liberal Party.

In the 1932 election held less than a month later, McDiarmid was elected to the provincial assembly in the constituency of Winnipeg. He was the most popular candidate of his party in the city-wide district. (Winnipeg elected ten members by STV at the time).

Provincial Liberal leader Murdoch Mackay was not elected in the 1932 election, and McDiarmid was recognized as the leading Liberal spokesman in the Liberal-Progressive coalition. He was not formally recognized as a party leader, as the Liberals were no longer an autonomous entity.

Ideologically, McDiarmid appears to have been on the right wing of his party. One-time Cooperative Commonwealth Federation leader Lloyd Stinson described him as the most right-wing member of the Liberal-Progressive government, and also accused him of being anti-labour. McDiarmid was re-elected in Winnipeg in 1936, finishing fifth in the city voters' first preferences.

In the election 1941, held after the creation of a grand coalition ministry with the Conservatives, CCF and Social Credit, he was the most popular candidate in the first preferences.

McDiarmid retained the Land and Natural Resources/Mines portfolios for the entirety of his time in cabinet, and was also Provincial Secretary from 28 November 1939, to 14 February 1946, Railway Commissioner and Minister of Industry and Commerce from 4 November 1940, to 30 June 1953, and (briefly) acting Labour Minister following the resignation of CCF leader Seymour Farmer in 1942. During his time in cabinet, McDiarmid was responsible for legislation opening northern Manitoba's mine fields to development. He died in 1965.

McDiarmid was second in the first count of Winnipeg votes in the general election of 1945 and was elected, after Seymour Farmer.

He was the most popular candidate again in 1949 when he ran in the new four-member district of Winnipeg South. He was elected.

McDiarmid announced his retirement from politics in 1953, and formally resigned from cabinet on 30 June of that year.

Following a period of intense media speculation, McDiarmid was appointed as Lieutenant Governor of Manitoba on 1 August of the same year. He served in this largely ceremonial position until 15 January 1960, when he was replaced by former Progressive Conservative party leader Errick Willis.

McDiarmid died in his Winnipeg home at age 82 in 1965 after a long illness.
