= Leader of the Opposition (Manitoba) =

The Leader of the Opposition (French: Chef de l'Opposition) in Manitoba is the Member of the Legislative Assembly of Manitoba who leads the party recognized as the Official Opposition. This status generally goes to the leader of the second largest party in the Legislative Assembly.

William Alexander Macdonald was the first officially recognized Leader of the Opposition in Manitoba, although Rodmond Roblin is considered to have been the de facto opposition leader from 1890 until he lost his seat in the 1892 provincial election.

As of 28 September 2026, the Leader of the Opposition of Manitoba has been Konrad Narth, the head of the Progressive Conservative Party of Manitoba.

== List of Opposition Leaders ==
Below is a list of parliamentary opposition leaders in the Legislative Assembly of Manitoba, from 1870 to the present.

Portrait	Name Electoral district (Birth–Death)	Term of office	Party
	William Alexander Macdonald (Note: W.A. Macdonald was the first officially recognized leader of the opposition and held the post until his election to the legislature was voided in 1893.); MLA for Brandon City (1860–1946)	1892–1893	Conservative
	John Andrew Davidson (Note: Davidson was the second officially recognized leader of the opposition and held the post until his election to the legislature was voided in 1894.); MLA for Beautiful Plains (1852–1903)	1893–1894	Conservative
	James Fisher (Note: It is unclear whether Fisher was de facto or de jure Opposition leader. It is also unclear whether he joined the Conservative Party at some point.); MLA for Russell (1840–1927)	1894–1896	Independent
	Rodmond Roblin (Note: Hugh John Macdonald was the party's official leader from 1897 but did not have a seat in the legislature so Roblin remained official opposition leader.); MLA for Woodlands (1853–1937)	1896–1900	Conservative
	Thomas Greenway; MLA for Mountain (1838–1908)	1900–1904	Liberal
	Charles Mickle (Note: Edward Brown was the Liberal Party's leader from 1906 to 1908 but did not have a seat in the legislature. It is unclear whether Mickle remained Official Opposition leader during this period, whether the position was assigned to another MLA, or whether it became vacant.); MLA for Birtle (1849–1919)	1904–1906	Liberal
	Charles Mickle; MLA for Birtle (1849–1919)	1908–1909	Liberal
	Tobias Norris; MLA for Lansdowne (1861–1936)	1910–1915	Liberal
	Albert Prefontaine; MLA for Carillon (1861–1935)	1915–1920	Conservative
Unknown (Note: Despite having fewer seats than the Independent Farmers following the 1920 provincial election, the Conservatives remained the official opposition. The Conservative leader Richard G. Willis did not win a seat in the election, so it is unknown who served as leader of the Opposition.); 1920–1922
	Tobias Norris; MLA for Lansdowne (1861–1936)	1922–1927	Liberal
	Fawcett Taylor; MLA for Portage la Prairie (1878–1940)	1927–1933	Conservative
	William Sanford Evans; MLA for Winnipeg (1869–1949)	1933–1936	Conservative
	Errick Willis; MLA for Deloraine (1896–1967)	1936–1940	Conservative
	Lewis Stubbs (Note: Stubbs was the only sitting opposition MLA for a period in 1940 after all the remaining opposition parties joined John Bracken's wartime coalition government. It's unclear whether he was given the title of leader of the Official Opposition or whether he retained such a title after Social Credit MLA Salome Halldorson and Conservatives John Poole and Huntly Ketchen left the governing coalition to sit on the opposition bench prior to the 1941 general election.); MLA for Winnipeg (1878–1958)	1940–1941	Independent
	Huntly Ketchen; MLA for Winnipeg (1872–1959)	1941–1943	Anti-Coalition Conservative
	Seymour Farmer; MLA for Winnipeg (1878–1951)	1943–1947	Co-operative Commonwealth
	Edwin Hansford; MLA for St. Boniface (1895–1959)	1948–1950	Co-operative Commonwealth
	Errick Willis; MLA for Deloraine (1896–1967)	1950–1954	Progressive Conservative
	Dufferin Roblin; MLA for Winnipeg South (1917–2010)	1954–1958	Progressive Conservative
	Douglas Lloyd Campbell; MLA for Lakeside (1895–1995)	1958–1961	Liberal
	Gildas Molgat; MLA for Ste. Rose (1895–1995)	1961–1969	Liberal
	Walter Weir; MLA for Minnedosa (1929–1985)	1969–1971	Progressive Conservative
	Sidney Spivak; MLA for River Heights (1928–2002)	1971–1975	Progressive Conservative
	Donald Craik; MLA for Riel (1931–1985)	1975–1976	Progressive Conservative
	Sterling Lyon; MLA for Souris-Killarney (1927–2010)	1976–1977	Progressive Conservative
	Edward Schreyer; MLA for Rossmere (born 1935)	1977–1979	New Democratic
	Howard Pawley; MLA for Selkirk (1934–2015)	1979–1981	New Democratic
	Sterling Lyon; MLA for Charleswood (1927–2010)	1981–1983	Progressive Conservative
	Gary Filmon; MLA for Tuxedo (born 1942)	1983–1988	Progressive Conservative
	Sharon Carstairs; MLA for River Heights (born 1942)	1988–1990	Liberal
	Gary Doer; MLA for Concordia (born 1948)	1990–1999	New Democratic
	Gary Filmon; MLA for Tuxedo (born 1942)	1999–2000	Progressive Conservative
	Bonnie Mitchelson; MLA for River East (born 1947)	2000	Progressive Conservative
	Stuart Murray; MLA for Kirkfield Park (born 1954)	2000–2006	Progressive Conservative
	Hugh McFadyen; MLA for Fort Whyte (born 1967)	2006–2012	Progressive Conservative
	Brian Pallister; MLA for Fort Whyte (born 1954)	2012–2016	Progressive Conservative
	Flor Marcelino; MLA for Logan (born 1951 or 1952)	2016–2017	New Democratic
	Wab Kinew; MLA for Fort Rouge (born 1981)	2017–2023	New Democratic
	Heather Stefanson; MLA for Tuxedo (born 1970)	2023–2024	Progressive Conservative
	Wayne Ewasko; MLA for Lac du Bonnet	2024–2025	Progressive Conservative
	Obby Khan; MLA for Fort Whyte (born 1980)	2025–2026	Progressive Conservative
	Konrad Narth; MLA for La Verendrye (born 1987)	2026–present	Progressive Conservative
