= 1936 Manitoba general election =

Election to determine Members of the Legislative Assembly in Manitoba, Canada

- July 27, 1936

55 seats of the Legislative Assembly of Manitoba 27 seats needed for a majority
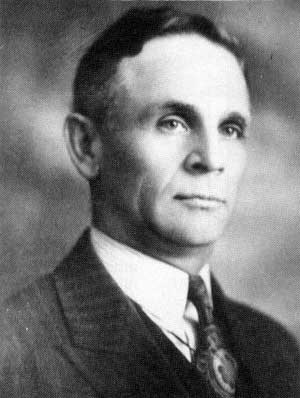

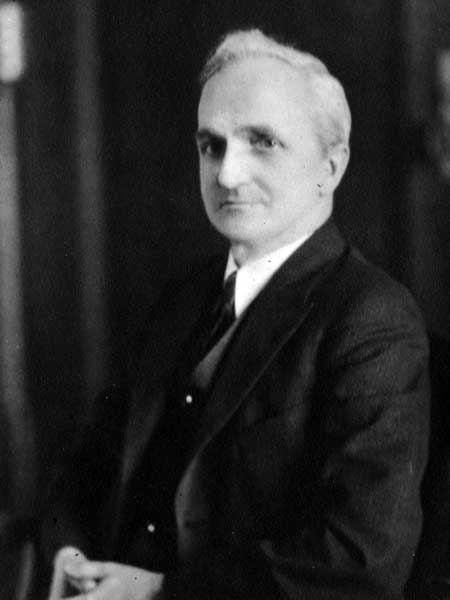

	First party	Second party
Leader	John Bracken	Errick Willis
Party	Liberal–Progressive	Conservative
Leader since	August 8, 1922	June 9, 1936
Leader's seat	The Pas	Deloraine
Last election	38	10
Seats won	23	16
Seat change	▼15	▲6
Popular vote	91,357	71,927
Percentage	35.3%	27.8%
Swing	▼4.3pp	▼7.6pp
	Third party	Fourth party
Leader	Seymour Farmer	none
Party	ILP-CCF	Social Credit
Leader since	1936
Leader's seat	Winnipeg
Last election	5	-
Seats won	7	7
Seat change	▲2	new
Popular vote	30,983	23,413
Percentage	12.0%	9.0%
Swing	▼4.5pp	new
Premier before election
John Bracken
Liberal–Progressive
Premier after election
John Bracken
Liberal–Progressive

The 1936 Manitoba general election was held July 27, 1936 to elect Members of the Legislative Assembly of the Province of Manitoba, Canada. The Liberal-Progressives won minority government in this election, taking 23 seats out of 55 and 35 per cent of the vote.

This was the second election in Manitoba after the formation of a Liberal-Progressive alliance in 1932. The Progressive Party, which had governed the province since 1922, forged an alliance with the Liberal Party just prior to the 1932 provincial election to prevent the Conservative Party from winning. This alliance won the 1932 election under Premier John Bracken's leadership, and the two parties had effectively become united by 1936.

The Liberal-Progressives faced opposition from a variety of parties in the 1936 election. The Conservative Party remained the dominant opposition group, and the most serious challenge to the government. On the left, the Independent Labour Party (ILP) formed an alliance with the national Co-operative Commonwealth Federation (CCF), and contested the election as the ILP-CCF. The Communist Party also fielded a strong candidate in Winnipeg, while the upstart Social Credit League also ran candidates, hoping to repeat William Aberhart's surprising victory in Alberta the previous year.

Despite economic hardships in the province, Bracken expected that his government would be returned with another majority. He was mistaken. Although the Liberal-Progressives won the election, they could claim only twenty-two seats out of 53 after the initial results were declared. The Conservative party, under its new leader, former federal Member of Parliament (MP) Errick Willis, finished a close second with sixteen. The ILP-CCF won seven seats, while the Social Credit League unexpectedly won five. One independent Liberal was also elected. A number of rural ridings, which had previously supported Liberal-Progressive candidates, shifted to the Conservatives or to Social Credit in this poll.

The greatest surprise of the election occurred in the Winnipeg constituency, which elected ten members via a single transferable ballot. Former judge Lewis Stubbs, an independent leftist, received an astounding 24,805 votes on the first ballot, almost 20,000 more than his nearest competitor. The second-place candidate, moreover, was James Litterick, the first openly declared communist to win election at the state or federal level in North America.

After the election, Bracken attempted to persuade Errick Willis to form a four-year alliance of the Liberal-Progressive and Conservative parties, so as to provide a stable government for the province. Willis rejected the offer the same day, claiming his caucus was unwilling to accept it.

The provincial impasse continued until August 13, when the Social Credit League unexpectedly announced that it would provide support to Bracken's government in the legislature. Social Credit did not formally join with the Liberal-Progressives in a coalition government, but provided critical support to Bracken's minority government for the next four years.

Ironically, Bracken's own constituency of The Pas was the site of one of the two deferred elections. He was re-elected, while a second Independent Liberal was returned in Rupertsland.

Including the Social Credit MLAs, Bracken's government could count on the support of only 28 members out of 55. He was nonetheless able to keep his government intact for four years, and in late 1940 formed a new wartime coalition government with the Conservatives, CCF and Social Credit. This coalition contested the 1941 election, and won a landslide majority.

The Communist Party was not included in this coalition, as it had been declared illegal after the start of World War II. James Litterick was expelled from the legislature in 1940 and went into hiding. He and CPC leader Tim Buck surrendered themselves to police in 1942 and spent time in the Don Jail, being released in 1942 or 1943. Litterick's whereabouts after the war are unknown. His disappearance has been the cause of speculation in the Canadian left. Some say that he was a spy for the Royal Canadian Mounted Police, and that he was killed as a traitor during the war by other members of the Communist Party. This has never been verified, however.

Like the previous Manitoba elections, all the voters cast preferential votes. Ten MLAs were elected in Winnipeg through Single transferable votes; all others were elected through Instant-runoff voting.

== Results ==
Manitoba general election (July 27, 1936)
Party	Leader	First-preference votes		Seats			
Party	Leader	Votes	% FPv	Cand.	1932	Elected	Change
Liberal–Progressive	John Bracken	91,357	36.1	49	36	23	13▼
Conservative	Errick Willis	71,927	28.4	37	10	16	6▲
ILP-CCF	Seymour Farmer	30,983	17.3	13	5	7	2▲
Independent		27,552	10.9	4	–	1	1▲
Social Credit	–	23,413	9.2	12	–	5	5▲
Communist	James Litterick	5,864	2.3	1	–	1	1▲
Independent-Liberal		2,340	0.9	2	–	2	2▲
Independent-LP		–	–	–	2	–	2▼
Independent-Progressive		–	–	–	1	–	1▼
Independent-Farmer-Labour		–	–	–	1	–	1▼
Valid		253,436	100.0	118	55	55	–
Rejected		5,524					
Total votes cast		258,960					
Registered voters/Turnout (Note: Excludes constituencies where candidates returned by acclamation)		391,902	66.1				

=== Results by riding ===
Bold names indicate members returned by acclamation. Incumbents are marked with *.

Arthur: John R. Pitt*
Assiniboia: James Aiken
Beautiful Plains: John Poole
Birtle: Francis Bell
Brandon: George Dinsdale*
Carillon: Edmond Prefontaine*
Cypress: James Christie*
Dauphin: Robert Hawkins*
Deloraine: Errick Willis
Dufferin: John Munn*
Emerson: Herbert Wright (Ind-Lib)
Ethelbert: William Lisowsky
Fairford: **Stuart Garson***
Fisher: Nicholas Bachynsky*
Gilbert Plains: Stanley Fox
Gimli: Joseph Wawrykow
Gladstone: William Morton*
Glenwood: James Breakey*
Hamiota: Norman Turnbull
Iberville: John Lamont
Kildonan & St. Andrews: James McLenaghen*
Killarney: John Laughlin
Lakeside: Douglas Campbell*
Lansdowne: Matthew Sutherland
La Verendrye: Sauveur Marcoux
Manitou: Hugh Morrison
Minnedosa: Earl Rutledge*
Morden & Rhineland: Wallace C. Miller
Morris: William Clubb*
Mountain: Ivan Schultz*
Norfolk: John Lawrie
Portage la Prairie: Toby Sexsmith*
Roblin: Sidney Rogers
Rockwood: Mungo Lewis
Rupertsland: Oddur Olafson (Ind-Lib)
Russell: Isaac Griffiths*
St. Boniface: Harold Lawrence*
St. Clements: Herbert Sulkers
St. George: Salome Halldorson
Ste. Rose: Maurice Dane MacCarthy*
Springfield: Evelyn Shannon
Swan River: George Renouf*
The Pas: John Bracken*
Turtle Mountain: Alexander Welch*
Virden: Robert Mooney*
Winnipeg: William Major*
Winnipeg: John Stewart McDiarmid*
Winnipeg: Seymour Farmer*
Winnipeg: Marcus Hyman*
Winnipeg: John Queen*
Winnipeg: James Barry
Winnipeg: Huntly Ketchen*
Winnipeg: Ralph Webb*
Winnipeg: Lewis Stubbs*
Winnipeg: James Litterick

=== Turnover on runoff ===
Among the single-member ridings, there was only one case where the first-place candidate in first-preference votes failed to win:

St. Boniface - Summary of results (1936)
Party	Candidate	First-preference votes		Maximum votes		
Party	Candidate	Votes	% FPv	Votes	Round	Initial vs transfer votes mix
Liberal–Progressive	L.P. Gagnon	3,630	32.22	4,235	3	
Independent Labour	**Harold Lawrence***	3,157	28.03	**4,620**	3	
Conservative	G.C. McLean	2,747	24.39	2,890	2	
Social Credit	J.F. Jodoin	1,730	15.36	1,730	1	
**Total**		11,264	100.00			
**Exhausted votes**				2,409	21.39%	

=== Winnipeg ===
Winnipeg:

Winnipeg MLAs returned by party
Party	MLAs
Liberal–Progressive	2
ILP-CCF	3
Conservative	3
Independent	1
Communist	1
**Total**	10

Ten MLAs were elected through Single transferable vote.

Winnipeg (ten members)
Party	Candidate	FPv%	Count																
Party	Candidate	FPv%	1	2	3	4	5	6	7	8	9	10	11	12	13	14	15	16	17
Independent	**Lewis Stubbs**	31.27	**24,805**	**7,214**															
Communist	**James Litterick**	7.39	5,864	**7,971**	**7,214**														
Conservative	**Ralph Webb*** (Note: Webb's surplus of 36 votes was not transferred until the 13th count)	7.03	5,581	**7,250**	**7,250**	**7,250**	**7,250**	**7,250**	**7,250**	**7,250**	**7,250**	**7,250**	**7,250**	**7,250**	**7,214**				
Liberal–Progressive	**William Major***	6.56	5,211	5,558	5,564	5,568	5,574	5,589	5,863	5,907	6,457	6,482	6,576	6,691	6,692	6,694	6,704	6,848	**7,920**
Liberal–Progressive	**John Stewart McDiarmid***	5.86	4,652	5,235	5,252	5,267	5,278	5,298	5,618	5,642	6,462	6,519	6,650	6,800	6,802	6,806	6,817	7,039	**8,289**
Conservative	**James Barry**	5.11	4,055	4,702	4,713	4,724	4,735	4,747	4,817	4,867	4,964	4,999	5,411	5,551	5,559	5,566	5,587	**7,251**	
Liberal–Progressive	Mary Dyma	4.85	3,849	4,313	4,338	4,346	4,385	4,403	4,511	4,543	4,696	4,721	4,769	4,869	4,870	4,877	4,891	4,944	
Conservative	**Huntly Ketchen***	4.76	3,775	4,471	4,485	4,490	4,505	4,546	4,598	4,626	4,760	4,803	5,507	5,713	5,727	5,730	5,750	**7,771**	
Cooperative Commonwealth Federation	**Marcus Hyman***	4.36	3,459	4,357	4,408	4,430	4,562	4,586	4,607	4,623	4,649	4,905	4,947	5,280	5,283	5,429	5,775	5,871	**6,127**
Cooperative Commonwealth Federation	**John Queen*** (Note: Queen's surplus of 172 votes was not transferred until the 14th count)	3.41	2,709	5,754	5,949	6,027	6,216	6,264	6,381	6,476	6,596	**7,386**	**7,386**	**7,386**	**7,386**	**7,214**			
Conservative	R.W.B. Swail	3.15	2,500	3,106	3,110	3,117	3,123	3,141	3,169	3,197	3,275	3,300	4,577	4,739	4,746	4,749	4,760		
Conservative	Gunnar Thorvaldson	3.03	2,400	2,783	2,791	2,802	2,808	2,821	2,925	2,960	3,041	3,063							
Cooperative Commonwealth Federation	**Seymour Farmer*** (Note: Farmer's surplus of 433 votes was not transferred until the 15th count)	2.48	1,969	4,533	4,704	4,812	5,250	5,338	5,408	5,493	5,555	6,596	6,692	**7,647**	**7,647**	**7,647**	**7,214**		
Social Credit	G.E. Smith	2.24	1,780	2,502	2,536	2,564	2,576	3,025	3,045	4,024	4,063	4,149	4,200						
Liberal–Progressive	C. Rice-Jones	2.23	1,767	2,124	2,133	2,142	2,147	2,157	2,349	2,375									
Liberal–Progressive	Paul Bardal	1.46	1,155	1,489	1,498	1,503	1,513	1,527											
Cooperative Commonwealth Federation	William Ivens*	1.42	1,130	2,080	2,199	2,245	2,412	2,435	2,464	2,506	2,542								
Social Credit	H. Streuber	1.22	964	1,273	1,289	1,320	1,329	1,648	1,673										
Social Credit	A.C. Benjamin	0.99	788	1,147	1,167	1,182	1,188												
Cooperative Commonwealth Federation	Beatrice A. Brigden	0.77	607	978	1,010	1,093													
Cooperative Commonwealth Federation	C.G. Stewart	0.40	318	504	520														
Exhausted ballots		—	—	–	–	34	65	141	238	427	606	743	951	2,990	2,990	2,990	2,990	3,550	5,916
Electorate: 133,666 Valid: 79,344 Spoilt: 1,486 Quota: 7,214 Turnout: 80,830 (60.47%)

* - Incumbent

Winnipeg (analysis of transferred votes, ranked in order of 1st preference votes)
Party	Candidate	Maximum round	Maximum votes	Share in maximum round	Maximum votes First round votes Transfer votes
Independent	**Lewis Stubbs**	1	24,805	31.27%	
Communist	**James Litterick**	2	7,971	10.05%	
Conservative	**Ralph Webb**	2	7,250	9.14%	
Liberal-Progressive	**William Major**	17	7,920	10.79%	
Liberal-Progressive	**John Stewart McDiarmid**	17	8,289	11.29%	
Conservative	**James Barry**	16	7,251	9.57%	
Liberal-Progressive	Mary Dyma	16	4,944	5.08%	
Conservative	**Huntly Ketchen**	16	7,771	10.25%	
ILP-CCF	**Marcus Hyman**	17	6,127	8.34%	
ILP-CCF	**John Queen**	10	7,386	9.40%	
Conservative	R.W.B. Swail	15	4,760	6.23%	
Conservative	Gunnar Thorvaldson	10	3,063	3.90%	
ILP-CCF	**Seymour Farmer**	12	7,647	10.41%	
Social Credit	G.E. Smith	11	4,200	5.36%	
Liberal-Progressive	C. Rice-Jones	8	2,375	3.01%	
Liberal-Progressive	Paul Bardal	6	1,527	1.93%	
ILP-CCF	William Ivens	9	2,542	3.23%	
Social Credit	H. Streuber	7	1,673	2.11%	
Social Credit	A.C. Benjamin	5	1,188	1.50%	
ILP-CCF	Beatrice A. Brigden	4	1,093	1.38%	
ILP-CCF	C.G. Stewart	3	520	0.66%	
Exhausted votes			5916	7.46%	

== Sources ==
The first ballot results for Winnipeg and results for all other constituencies are taken from an official Manitoba government publication entitled "Manitoba elections, 1920-1941", cross-referenced with an appendix to the government's report of the 2003 provincial election. The vote transfers, as given above, are presented in Glashan, P.R. in Canada (1951) (available online). The Canadian parliamentary guide lists slightly different results for Glenwood, but the other two sources are more comprehensive and may be taken as more reliable.

All ballot results for Winnipeg after the first count are taken from reports in the Winnipeg Free Press newspaper. It is possible that some errors appeared in the original publication.

== Post-election changes ==
The ILP-CCF parliamentary group became known as CCF after the election.

Winnipeg (dec. Marcus Hyman, 1938).

Winnipeg (James Litterick disqualified from the legislature, 1940).

Lewis Stubbs was initially the only member of the legislature to remain in opposition when a four-party coalition was formed in 1940. He was later joined by Salome Halldorson of Social Credit, as well as John Poole and Huntly Ketchen of the Conservatives.
