= Nicholas Hryhorczuk =

Canadian politician (1888–1979)

Nicholas Apoluner Hryhorczuk (December 17, 1888 – November 23, 1979) was a politician in Manitoba, Canada. He served in the Legislative Assembly of Manitoba from 1920 to 1936, and again from 1941 to 1945. He was the first person of Ukrainian descent to serve as an MLA in Manitoba.

Born in Buchachky (now in Kolomyia Raion, Ivano-Frankivsk Oblast), then in the Austro-Hungarian Empire, Hryhorczuk came to Canada in 1897 with his family, who settled north of Gilbert Plains, Manitoba. He was educated at Kolomyja Public School. In 1911, he moved to Ethelbert, where he worked as a merchant. Hryhorczuk married Nelly Dzaman in 1905. From 1917 to 1919, he served as reeve of Ethelbert municipality. Hryhorczuk was a member of the Canadian Foresters.

Hryhorczuk was first elected to the Manitoba legislature in the 1920 provincial election. Running as an "Independent Farmer", he was easily elected in the Ethelbert constituency. In the 1922 election, he was nominated as a candidate of the United Farmers of Manitoba (UFM) and was re-elected without opposition in a deferred election.

The UFM won the 1922 election, and formed government as the Progressive Party of Manitoba. Hyrhorczuk rallied support for John Bracken to serve as Premier of Manitoba, and later became a backbench supporter of Bracken's government. He was re-elected in the provincial elections of 1927 and 1932.

Prior to the 1932 election, the Progressive Party formed an alliance with the Manitoba Liberal Party. This alliance soon took the form of a merger, and government members became known as "Liberal-Progressives".

Hryhorczuk was unexpectedly defeated in the 1936 provincial election by William Lisowsky, a candidate of the Manitoba Social Credit League. Lisowsky did not seek re-election in the 1941 election, however, and Hryhorczuk was narrowly returned over Fred Zaplitny of the Cooperative Commonwealth Federation (CCF).

In the 1945 provincial election, CCF candidate Michael Sawchuk defeated Hryhorczuk by 338 votes. This ended Hryhorczuk's career in politics. His son, Michael N. Hryhorczuk, later served in the legislature from 1949 to 1966.

The elder Hryhorczuk retired from business in 1978, the same year that his son died, and died the following year at age 90.
