= Arthur Boivin =

Canadian politician (1878–1951)

Arthur Rivers Boivin (1878 – July 27, 1951) was a politician in Manitoba, Canada. He served in the Legislative Assembly of Manitoba from 1917 to 1936, and again from 1941 to 1945.

Boivin, a Franco-Manitoban and the son of farmer Wilfred Boivin, was first elected to the Manitoba legislature for the constituency of Iberville in a by-election held on November 1, 1917. Boivin initially served as a member of the Conservative Party, which was the dominant party among Manitoba's francophone community at the time.

Many Franco-Manitobans shifted away from the Conservative Party after the end of World War I. Boivin was returned as an independent candidate in the 1920 provincial election, and subsequently affiliated himself with the United Farmers of Manitoba (UFM). He was easily re-elected as a UFM candidate in the 1922 provincial election.

The UFM won the 1922 election, and formed government as the Progressive Party of Manitoba. Boivin served as a backbench supporter of John Bracken's administration, and was re-elected as a pro-government independent candidate in the elections of 1927 and 1932.

Prior to the 1932 election, the Progressive Party of Manitoba joined with the Manitoba Liberal Party to form a "Liberal-Progressive" alliance. This alliance was made permanent after the election, though it did not always prevent Liberals and Progressives from running against one another in specific constituencies. Boivin was challenged by a pro-government Liberal named John Lamont in the 1936 election, and lost by 82 votes.

Again campaigning as a pro-government independent candidate, Boivin challenged Lamont in the 1941 provincial election and won without difficulty. Though he still supported the Liberal-Progressive government, Boivin sometimes sided with the small opposition caucus in legislative debates after 1941. He retired from the assembly in 1945.
