= William Lisowsky =

Canadian politician

William Lisowsky (January 1, 1892 – 1958) was a politician in Manitoba, Canada. He served in the Legislative Assembly of Manitoba from 1936 to 1941, as a representative of the Social Credit League.

The son of Nicolas Lisowsky and Lubow Stepanenko, Lisowsky was born in Kaney, Ukraine, and came to Canada in 1910. He was educated in Brandon and Winnipeg, and worked as a public school teacher.

He was elected to the Manitoba legislature in the 1936 provincial election, defeating Liberal-Progressive incumbent Nicholas Hryhorczuk by 226 votes. Voters elected only five Social Credit party candidates in this election, but it played a significant role in the subsequent parliament by supporting John Bracken's minority Liberal-Progressive government.

Social Credit members formally joined an all-party coalition government in 1940. This decision split the party, and four members including Lisowsky were voted out of the party for supporting the coalition. Many Social Credit candidates in the 1941 election campaigned against the coalition. Lisowsky was the only member of his party caucus not to seek re-election.
