= Marcus Hyman =

Canadian politician

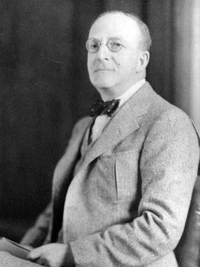
Marcus Hyman, taken some time 1933-1936

Marcus Hyman, M.A., LL.B. (July 13, 1883 – December 31, 1938) was a politician in Manitoba, Canada. He served in the Legislative Assembly of Manitoba from 1932 to 1938, representing the Independent Labour Party.

== Biography ==
Hyman was born to a Jewish family near Vilna, Poland. His father, the Rabbi Aaron Hyman, was the author of several works. The younger Hyman was educated at Worcester College, Oxford, and received five scholarships during his time in England. From 1910 to 1913, he worked as the private tutor to an India prince. He came to Canada in 1913, and worked as a barrister-at-law, also lecturing at the Manitoba Law School from 1915 to 1921 in international law and legal history. In 1914, he married Erna Ziembiska.

During World War I, Hyman was president of the Western Canadian Relief Fund for the Relief of War Sufferers and, in 1917-18, chair of the Winnipeg Committee of the British and Canadian Recruiting Mission. The letter organization helped to raise men for combat in Egypt and Palestine. From 1923 to 1928, he was a member of the Winnipeg School Board.

Hyman's political career effectively began with the Winnipeg General Strike. He acted as defense council for the strikers, and defended a number of east European strikers accused of "foreign agitation". He continued his practice as a labour lawyer in the 1920s, and was a supporter of the One Big Union.

He first sought election to the Manitoba legislature in the 1927 provincial election, but finished third in Manitoba riding. He ran for Mayor of Winnipeg in 1930 and 1931, but lost on both occasions.

He was elected to the Manitoba legislature in the 1932 election, running as a candidate in the Winnipeg constituency. At the time, Winnipeg elected ten members by preferential balloting. Hyman finished ninth on the first count, and was subsequently declared elected. He served with his ILP colleagues on the opposition benches throughout his time in the legislature.

His re-election in the 1936 election was not guaranteed, as the ILP faced strong opposition from the Communist Party and independent leftist Lewis Stubbs. Hyman again finished ninth on the first count, but had to wait for the sixteenth count to be confirmed as successful.

Hyman was one of the most respected members of the legislature, and spoke on subjects such as education, civil liberties and labour legislation. He was an early supporter of larger school units for the province, considering the local units to be ineffective. Hyman also endorsed the creation of Riding Mountain National Park.

He is remembered particularly for having co-sponsored the province's Anti-Defamation Bill, which allowed members of a racial or religious group to sue for an injunction against a defaming publisher or author. Known as the "Hyman Act", this bill was supported the John Bracken government and given unanimous passage in 1934.

He died in Winnipeg in 1938, while still a member of the legislature.

== Legacy ==
The University of Manitoba offers a Marcus Hyman Memorial Scholarship. One past winner of the scholarship was Larry Zolf.
