= Salome Halldorson =

Canadian politician (1887–1970)

Elin Salome Halldorson (December 29, 1887 – May 31, 1970) was a politician in Manitoba, Canada.

She served in the Legislative Assembly of Manitoba from 1936 to 1941 as a member of the Social Credit League. She was the second woman and the first woman of Icelandic origin to serve in the provincial legislature.

== Early life ==
Halldorson was born to Halldor Halldorson and Kristin Palsdottir in Lundar, Manitoba. She was educated at Wesley College in Winnipeg and the University of Manitoba, receiving a Bachelor of Arts degree. Halldorson worked as a teacher of languages, teaching Latin, French and German from 1918 to 1938 at Jon Bjarnason Academy, a private school started by the Icelandic Lutheran Church in 1913.

== Career ==
She was elected to the Manitoba legislature in the 1936 provincial election, defeating Liberal-Progressive incumbent Skuli Sigfusson by 156 votes in the constituency of St. George. She was the first woman elected to the legislature since the resignation of Edith Rogers in 1932.

The Social Credit League won only five seats (out of 55) in this election, but held the balance of power by maintaining John Bracken's Liberal-Progressive government in office. In 1940, the party formally entered an all-party coalition government with the Liberal-Progressives, Conservatives and Cooperative Commonwealth Federation. Independent Member of the Legislative Assembly (MLA) Lewis Stubbs was initially the only legislator not to join the government.

Social Credit split on the coalition issue, and Halldorson broke with the rest of her caucus to serve as the legislature's second opposition member. The Social Credit League subsequently expelled the other four MLAs, although they continued to identify themselves as representatives of the party. The reconstructed Social Credit League endorsed Halldorson's decision, and Social Credit Premier of Alberta William Aberhart also supported her.

The 1941 election greatly reduced Social Credit as a political force in the province. All of the anti-coalition candidates were defeated, and Halldorson finished a distant second against Sigfusson in St George.

In addition to her career in the legislature, Halldorson served as vice-president and president of the Manitoba Social Credit League in the 1930s and 1940s.

In 1943, Halldorson contested a federal by-election in Selkirk as a candidate of the Social Credit Party of Canada. She came a very distant third, finishing almost 9,000 votes behind successful candidate William Bryce of the Cooperative Commonwealth Federation. She was re-nominated in the 1945 provincial election, but declined to stand.

Her brother Christian also served in the Manitoba assembly after her stint there.

== Later life ==
Halldorson later taught at Morden, Transcona and at Balmoral Hall. In 1953, she wrote against proposed anti-discrimination legislation as unduly restricting the freedom of employers.
