= John Salmon Lamont =

Canadian politician (1885–1964)

John Salmon "Bud" Lamont, Sr. (April 15, 1885 – October 11, 1964) was a politician in Manitoba, Canada. He served in the Legislative Assembly of Manitoba from 1936 to 1941 as a Liberal-Progressive representative.

Lamont was born in Montague, Prince Edward Island, to Malcolm Lamont and the former Catherine Cantello. He was educated at Prince of Wales College, the University of Manitoba, and Princeton University. He received a Master of Arts degree from Princeton and a law degree from Manitoba, and worked as a barrister-at-law. Service in the First World War, with the Royal Canadian Artillery, interrupted his legal career temporarily. Lamont also became reeve of the Rural Municipality of Assiniboia in 1931, and continued in this position after being elected to the provincial legislature.

John Lamont married May Bastin in 1922. They had five children: Mary, John Jr., Jean, Charles, and Frank.

He was elected to the legislature in the 1936 provincial election, defeating independent candidate Arthur Boivin by 82 votes in Iberville. He served as a backbench supporter of John Bracken's government for the next five years, and was resoundingly defeated by Boivin in the 1941 election.

Lamont's youngest son, Frank, was an unsuccessful candidate in the 1962 Manitoba general election. His grandson Dougald Lamont was the leader of the Manitoba Liberal Party from 2017 and MLA for St. Boniface from 2018 until 2023.
