= Harold Lawrence =

Canadian politician

Harold Frederick Lawrence (December 17, 1887 – 1953) was a politician in Manitoba, Canada. He served in the Legislative Assembly of Manitoba from 1932 to 1936.

Lawrence was born and educated in Burton upon Trent, England in 1887, and came to Canada in 1907. He worked as a railroad accountant for the Canadian National Railway, and became involved in the provincial labour movement in 1915. From 1917 to 1921, he served as general chairman of the Canadian Brotherhood Railroad Employees Western Lines.

Lawrence also became active in Manitoba's Independent Labour Party (ILP), and was first elected to the provincial legislature under its banner in the 1932 general election. Running in St. Boniface, he defeated longtime Conservative representative Joseph Bernier by 504 votes. Bernier actually defeated Lawrence by six votes on first preferences, but lost on transfers; the province was using the single transferable ballot at the time.

For the 1936 provincial election, the ILP ran candidates in an alliance with the newly formed Cooperative Commonwealth Federation (CCF). Lawrence again finished second on first preferences, but was declared elected on the third count over Liberal-Progressive candidate L.P. Gagnon. After the election, the provincial ILP organization was gradually superseded by the CCF.

In 1940, the Manitoba CCF joined an all-party coalition government. Lawrence sat with his colleagues as a government backbencher, but did not seek re-election in the provincial election of 1941. He died in 1953.

Lloyd Stinson, who led the Manitoba CCF from 1952 to 1959, once described Lawrence as a "rough-and-ready railwayman".
