= Alexander Welch =

Canadian politician

Alexander Robert Welch (July 15, 1873 – May 6, 1961) was a politician in Manitoba, Canada. He served in the Legislative Assembly of Manitoba from 1929 to 1945, and was a cabinet minister in the governments of John Bracken and Stuart Garson.

Welch was born in Brechin, Scotland, the son of James Welch and Mary Ingram, and came to Canada with his parents in 1874. He was educated in Stratford, Ontario. He trained as a shoemaker with his father and followed that trade until 1893 when he moved to Manitoba and entered business as a merchant. In 1896, he married Hester Graham. Welch served as mayor of Boissevain, Manitoba from 1905 to 1906 and was chair of the Boissevain School Board from 1916 to 1929, also serving as president of the Conservative Association in the Turtle Mountain constituency during the same period.

He was first elected to the Manitoba legislature in a by-election held on June 22, 1929, following the death of former Conservative leader Richard Gardiner Willis. Welch defeated W.E. Campbell of the Progressive Party by 332 votes. The Conservatives were the main opposition party in Manitoba during this period, and Welch sat with his party on the opposition benches.

Welch was narrowly re-elected in the 1932 provincial election, defeating a Liberal-Progressive candidate by only 55 votes. He was returned by an increased margin in the 1936 election.

In 1940, the Conservatives joined with the Liberal-Progressives in a coalition government. Welch was chosen as one of his party's cabinet representatives, and was named a minister without portfolio on November 4, 1940. He was returned without opposition in the 1941 provincial election.

Welch did not seek re-election in 1945, and resigned from cabinet on November 15 of that year.

He died aged 87 in Brandon, Manitoba in 1961 and was buried in Boissevain.
