= S. E. Rogers =

Canadian politician

Sydney Ernest Rogers (November 11, 1888–September 10, 1965) was a Manitoba politician. Between 1937 and 1941, he was the leader of the province's Social Credit Party.

== Biography ==
Rogers was born in 1888 on the Isle of Wight in England, the son of James Alexander Rogers and Elizabeth Spencer. Moving to Canada with his family in 1897, he later worked as a farmer. He was elected reeve of the Rural Municipality of Shell River in 1920, and held this position for well over a decade, serving two terms. In 1905, he married Georgina Elizabeth Johnston.

In 1936, Rogers was a candidate for the newly formed Social Credit League in Manitoba. This party was influenced by the recent victory of William Aberhart in Alberta, and promised a similar program of monetary reform.

The party did not have a leader during the election, but nevertheless succeeded in electing five of its candidates. Rogers was elected in the riding of Roblin.

The five-member caucus subsequently chose Stanley Fox as the party's leader. Fox stepped down in 1937, and was replaced by Rogers.

In 1940, Rogers was responsible for bringing Social Credit into the all-party coalition government proposed by Liberal-Progressive Premier John Bracken. Rogers did not join cabinet, standing aside for Norman Turnbull to become a minister without portfolio.

The decision to join government split the Social Credit ranks, and several of the party's candidates in 1941 ran against the coalition. Rogers, Fox and Turnbull (all government supporters) were the only party members re-elected, and the group does not seem to have had a leader during the parliament that followed. The Social Credit group, in fact, came to be regarded as little more than an appendage of the Liberal-Conservative coalition.

Rogers retired from the legislature in 1945, and died twenty years later.
