= Joseph Wawrykow =

Canadian politician

Joseph Wawrykow (April 25, 1908 – November 2, 1979) was a politician in Manitoba, Canada. He served in the Legislative Assembly of Manitoba from 1936 to 1945.

Wawrykow was born in Gimli, Manitoba to George Wawrykow and Marthe Grabowski, a Ukrainian immigrant family. He received a B.S.A. from the University of Manitoba, and worked as a teacher and farmer. In 1943, Wawrykow married Ann Kaschak.

He was first elected to the Manitoba legislature in the 1936 provincial election. Running as a candidate of the Independent Labour Party-Cooperative Commonwealth Federation (ILP-CCF), he defeated Liberal-Progressive candidate B.J. Lifman by 261 votes. After the election, his party was usually referred to as simply the Cooperative Commonwealth Federation (CCF).

In 1940, the CCF entered into a coalition government with three other parties in the legislature. This decision was opposed by supporters of the party, and the CCF performed poorly in the 1941 provincial election. Wawrykow was the only CCF candidate elected outside of Winnipeg, defeating Liberal-Progressive candidate S.T. Sigurdson by 555 votes. He did not run for re-election in 1945. After leaving politics, Wawrykow worked for the United Grain Growers.

He died in Winnipeg at the age of 71.
