= Winnipeg (provincial electoral district) =

Defunct electoral district in Manitoba, Canada

Winnipeg was a provincial electoral district of Manitoba, Canada, which was represented in the Legislative Assembly of Manitoba. This district covered the whole city of Winnipeg. The district was existed in two different periods -- 1870-1883 and 1920-1949.

From 1870 to 1883, the district of Winnipeg returned a single member to the assembly. The district was named Winnipeg and St. John for the election of 1870 only, and Winnipeg thereafter. In 1883, Winnipeg was divided into the new districts of Winnipeg North and Winnipeg South; a third district of Winnipeg Centre was created in 1888.

In 1920, the district of Winnipeg came back into use, this time as a multiple member district. The district returned ten members to the legislature who were all elected citywide through Single transferable vote form of proportional representation.

The district of Winnipeg existed until 1949, when the district was divided into three districts, Winnipeg North, South and Centre, with small parts going to Kildonan-Transcona and Iberville. Each of the three districts elected four members through the continued use of STV. This was the case until 1955, when the Winnipeg districts were divided into single-member districts with the member in each elected through First-past-the-post voting.

== Members of the Legislative Assembly (1870–1883) ==
Name	Party	Took office	Left office
Donald Smith	Government	1870	1873
Robert Davis	Opposition	1873	1878
Thomas Scott	Opposition	1878	1879
Thomas Scott	Conservative	1878	1882

== Elected MLAs: 10-member period (1920–1949) ==
Name	Party	1920*	1922	1927	1932	1936	1941	1945
George Armstrong	Socialist Party	check						
Paul Bardal	Liberal-Progressive						check	
James Alexander Barry	Conservative					check		
Duncan Cameron	Liberal	check						
Richard Craig	United Farmers		check					
Fred Dixon*	Dominion Labour (DLP)	check	check					
John K. Downes	Independent		check					
William Sanford Evans	Conservative		check	check	check			
Seymour Farmer	Independent Labour Party		check	check	check	check	check	check
Morris Gray	CCF						check	check
John Thomas Haig	Conservative	check	check	check	check			
Marcus Hyman	Independent Labour Party				check	check		
William Ivens	Labour (DLP/ILP)	check	check	check	check			
Robert Jacob	Liberal		check					
Thomas Herman Johnson	Liberal	check						
Bill Kardash	Communist Anti-coalition						check	check
Huntly Ketchen	Conservative				check	check	check	
Stephen Krawchyk	Independent Coalition						check	
James Litterick	Communist					check		
William Major	Progressive			check	check	check		
Ralph Maybank	Liberal-Progressive				check			
John Stewart McDiarmid	Liberal-Progressive				check	check	check	check
Edward William Montgomery	Progressive			check				
John Queen	Social Democrat/ILP	check	check	check	check	check		
Hugh Robson	Liberal			check				
Edith Rogers	Liberal	check	check	check				
William Scraba	Liberal-Progressive							check
Charles Rhodes Smith	Liberal-Progressive						check	check
Lloyd Stinson	CCF							check
John Stovel	Liberal	check						
Lewis Stubbs	Independent					check	check	check
Donovan Swailes	CCF							check
Gunnar Thorvaldson	Conservative						check	check
William Tobias	Conservative			check				
William J. Tupper	Conservative	check						
Ralph Webb	Conservative					check		

- Dixon resigned in 1923. seat left empty until next election.
- The 1920 vote count process is explained in full in 1920 Manitoba general election.

== Election results ==
=== 1870 ===
1870 Manitoba general election
Party	Candidate	Votes	%
Government	Donald Smith	70	52.63
Opposition	John Christian Schultz	63	47.37
Total valid votes		133	–
Rejected		N/A	–
Eligible voters / Turnout		N/A	–
Source(s) Source: Manitoba. Chief Electoral Officer (1999). Statement of Votes for the 37th Provincial General Election, September 21, 1999 (PDF) (Report). Winnipeg: Elections Manitoba.

=== 1874 by-election ===
Manitoba provincial by-election, 1874
Party	Candidate	Votes	%	±%
Opposition	Robert Atkinson Davis	Acclaimed	–	–
Total valid votes			–	–
Rejected		N/A	–	–
Eligible voters / Turnout		N/A	–	–
Source(s) Source: Manitoba. Chief Electoral Officer (1999). Statement of Votes for the 37th Provincial General Election, September 21, 2000 (PDF) (Report). Winnipeg: Elections Manitoba.

=== 1874 ===
1874 Manitoba general election
Party	Candidate	Votes	%	±%
Government	Robert Atkinson Davis	198	51.97	–
Undeclared	Thomas Scott	183	48.03	–
Total valid votes		381	–	–
Rejected		N/A	–	–
Eligible voters / Turnout		599	63.61	–
Source(s) Source: Manitoba. Chief Electoral Officer (1999). Statement of Votes for the 37th Provincial General Election, September 21, 2000 (PDF) (Report). Winnipeg: Elections Manitoba.

=== 1878 ===
1878 Manitoba general election
Party	Candidate	Votes	%	±%
Undeclared	Thomas Scott	273	93.49	45.46
Undeclared	W. A. Loucks	19	6.51	–
Total valid votes		292	–	–
Rejected		N/A	–	–
Eligible voters / Turnout		1,226	23.82	–
Source(s) Source: Manitoba. Chief Electoral Officer (1999). Statement of Votes for the 37th Provincial General Election, September 21, 2004 (PDF) (Report). Winnipeg: Elections Manitoba.

=== 1879 ===
1879 Manitoba general election
Party	Candidate	Votes	%	±%
Conservative	Thomas Scott	387	54.66	-38.83
Undeclared	Daniel Hunter McMillan	321	45.34	–
Total valid votes		708	–	–
Rejected		N/A	–	
Eligible voters / Turnout		N/A	–	–
Source(s) Source: Manitoba. Chief Electoral Officer (1999). Statement of Votes for the 37th Provincial General Election, September 21, 2005 (PDF) (Report). Winnipeg: Elections Manitoba.

=== 1880 by-election ===
Manitoba provincial by-election, 1880
Party	Candidate	Votes	%	±%
Unknown	Daniel Hunter McMillan	437	61.38	16.04
Unknown	Hector Mansfield Howell	146	20.51	–
Unknown	D. B. Woodworth	129	18.12	–
Total valid votes		712	–	–
Rejected		N/A	–	–
Eligible voters / Turnout		N/A	–	–
Source(s) Source: Manitoba. Chief Electoral Officer (1999). Statement of Votes for the 37th Provincial General Election, September 21, 2008 (PDF) (Report). Winnipeg: Elections Manitoba.

== See also ==
- List of Manitoba provincial electoral districts
- Canadian provincial electoral districts
