= Michael Sawchuk =

Canadian politician

Michael M. Sawchuk (1911. near Fork River, Manitoba – September 11, 1969) was a politician in Manitoba, Canada. He served in the Legislative Assembly of Manitoba from 1945 to 1949 as a representative of the Cooperative Commonwealth Federation.

Sawchuk was educated at Winnipegosis and Fork River. He graduated from the Dauphin Normal School in 1933, and worked as a teacher. Sawchuk was active in rural youth training, the Red Cross and the Manitoba Teachers' Association.

He was elected to the Manitoba legislature in the 1945 provincial election, defeating Liberal-Progressive incumbent Nicholas A. Hryhorczuk. by 338 votes in the constituency of Ethelbert. Sawchuk served as an opposition member in the legislature for the next four years, and did not run for re-election in 1949.

In 1950, he moved to Dauphin, where he worked in automobile sales. Sawchuck later died there at the age of 58.
