= William James Major =

Canadian politician (1881–1953)

Member of the Manitoba Legislative Assembly for Winnipeg
- In office 1927–1941

Personal details
- Born: November 10, 1881 Yeovil, Somerset, England
- Died: August 13, 1953 (aged 71) Winnipeg, Manitoba, Canada
- Party: Progressive Party of Manitoba
- Profession: lawyer

William James Major (November 10, 1881 – August 13, 1953) was a politician in Manitoba, Canada. He served in the Legislative Assembly of Manitoba from 1927 to 1941, and was a prominent cabinet minister in the government of John Bracken.

Major was born in Yeovil, Somerset, England in 1881, worked in the law office of Athelstan Rendall and migrated to Canada in 1901. He was educated in Manitoba, was called to the Manitoba Bar in 1913, and worked as a barrister-at-law. He also became active as a freemason.

Major was chosen as a star candidate of the governing Progressive Party in the 1927 provincial election. In this period of Canadian history, newly appointed cabinet ministers were required to resign their seats and seek the renewed support of their electorate. This was inconvenient for most government leaders, who frequently circumvented the regulation by appointing or shuffling cabinet ministers just before general elections. Major, despite his lack of political experience, was named as Bracken's Attorney General on April 29, 1927, and fought the election in this capacity. He proved an effective campaigner and was elected for Winnipeg, which returned ten members through the single transferable ballot voting method.

As Attorney General, Major oversaw construction of the Headingly jail and designed a liquor control act that lasted into the 1950s. He began an extensive revision project of the province's magisterial system in 1930, and was finally able to present his finished report to the legislature in 1940.

In 1929, Major and fellow cabinet minister William Clubb became caught up in a conflict-of-interest controversy involving the Winnipeg Electric Company (WEC). Both ministers had purchased shares in the company while negotiations for a government lease were still pending. It may be noted that opposition legislators had also purchased WEC stock during this period, and that Clubb's shares were in fact purchased by prominent Conservative legislator John Thomas Haig. Bracken initially defended both ministers, but was forced to call for their resignations on February 22, 1929.

Bracken did not judge the offence to be a serious transgression, and returned both Major and Clubb to their cabinet positions on May 18. On December 31, Major was also named as Minister of Telegraphs and Telephones.

The Progressives and Liberals of Manitoba formed an alliance for the 1932 provincial election, after which time government members became known as "Liberal-Progressives". Major endorsed this alliance, and was handily re-elected in Winnipeg. He was retained in both portfolios after the election.

Major emerged as a prominent Liberal-Progressive campaigner in the 1936 election, stressing the Bracken administration's record of fiscal prudence and successful management. He finished fourth on the first count in Winnipeg, and was re-elected on the sixteenth count. He again retained his previous portfolios, and also served as Manitoba's Municipal Commissioner from September 21, 1936 to November 22, 1939.

On November 4, 1940, Bracken's Liberal-Progressives entered a four-party coalition government with the Conservatives, the Cooperative Commonwealth Federation and the Social Credit League. Major continued to serve as Attorney-General and Minister of Telephones and Telegraphs, and was given additional responsibilities as Minister of Dominion-Provincial Relations.

He was appointed to the Court of the King's Bench just prior to the 1941 provincial election, and resigned his cabinet positions on April 1, 1941. He also headed the Greater Winnipeg Co-ordinating War Services Board during World War II, and led Manitoba's Red Cross campaign in the same period.

Major served as a member of the court until 1951, when he was forced to resign due to ill health. He died at home in Winnipeg two years later on August 13, 1953.
