= Earl Collins (politician) =

Canadian politician

Earl Thompson Collins (September 3, 1895 in Miami, Manitoba – August 31, 1958) was a politician in Manitoba, Canada. He served in the Legislative Assembly of Manitoba from 1943 to 1949.

The son of Christopher Fowler Collins and Susanna Thompson, Collins was educated in Miami, Winnipeg and Toronto. He worked as a farmer, was active in freemasonry, and was the secretary-treasurer of the Rosebank Cooperative, selling oil and supplies. In 1928, Collins married Hazel Viola Campbell.

He was first elected to the Manitoba legislature in a by-election held on June 22, 1943, in the constituency of Dufferin. At the time of this by-election, Manitoba was governed by a coalition government of Liberal-Progressives, Conservatives and Social Crediters. Collins, a Conservative, was elected by acclamation and sat as a government backbencher.

He was re-elected in the 1945 provincial election as an independent candidate supporting the coalition. He served as a government backbencher for another four years, and did not seek re-election in 1949.

Collins ran for the legislature again in the 1953 provincial election as a Progressive Conservative, and finished third against Liberal-Progressive candidate Walter McDonald. The coalition had ceased to exist by this time.
