= Ralph Webb =

Canadian politician

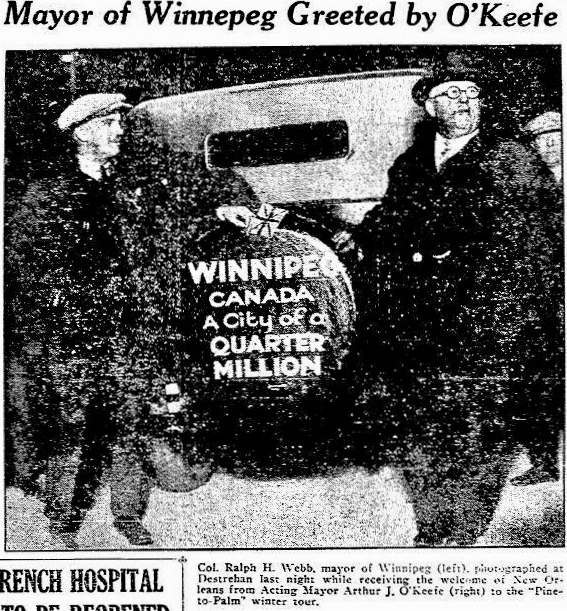
- Mayor Ralph Webb (left) in 1926 with New Orleans Mayor Arthur O'Keefe, celebrating the Jefferson Highway linking the two cities

Member of the Legislative Assembly of Manitoba
- In office 1932–1939

31st Mayor of Winnipeg
- In office 1925–1928
- Preceded by: Seymour Farmer
- Succeeded by: Daniel McLean
- In office 1930–1934
- Preceded by: Daniel McLean
- Succeeded by: John Queen

Personal details
- Born: Ralph Humphreys Webb; August 30, 1886 At sea between England and India
- Died: June 1, 1945 (aged 58) Ottawa, Ontario

Colonel Ralph Humphreys Webb DSO MC (August 30, 1886 – June 1, 1945) was a soldier and politician based in Manitoba, Canada. A monarchist, he served as the 31st Mayor of Winnipeg from 1925 to 1927 and again from 1930 to 1934, and also served in the Legislative Assembly of Manitoba from 1932 to 1941. Webb was a member of the Conservative Party.

== Early life ==
Webb was born at sea, on a British liner bound for India. He worked as a deck hand on a whaling vessel.

== Career ==
During World War I, he rose in the ranks of the army to Lieutenant-Colonel and commanded the 47th Battalion. He was awarded the Military Cross, the Distinguished Service Order, and the Croix de Guerre.

=== Politics ===
He was a virulent opponent of the Winnipeg General Strike in 1919, calling for the deportation of "radical agitators" and urging "the whole gang be dumped in the Red River".

His tenure as mayor began in 1924, when he defeated the incumbent Seymour Farmer. Webb's candidacy was supported by the city's business community, and his support base was located in the city's wealthy south-end.

He served as mayor 1925-1927 and 1930-1934.

After a series of labour strikes in 1931, Webb urged the "deportation of all undesirables", including communists, from Canada. A few Communist leaders were put in prison, and many deportations, usually on grounds of being dependents of the state, did occur.

A staunch monarchist, he also attacked Chicago's Big Bill Thompson for his criticisms of royalty.

A flamboyant politician, Webb was known as a strong civic booster and an effective salesman of Winnipeg on the international stage. After several re-elections, he was finally defeated by John Queen in 1934.

Webb was first elected to the legislature in the 1932 provincial election, defeating a candidate of the Independent Labour Party in the constituency of Assiniboia.

He ran for re-election in Winnipeg in the 1936 campaign. At the time, Winnipeg elected ten members by a single transferable ballot. Webb finished third on the first count, and was declared elected on the second.

== Retirement ==
Having served in opposition since 1915, the Conservatives joined an all-party coalition government in 1940. Webb briefly served as a government backbencher, but did not seek re-election in 1941. Webb died on June 1, 1945, in Ottawa, Ontario.
