= Norman Turnbull =

Canadian politician

Norman Leslie Turnbull (August 24, 1900 in Binscarth, Manitoba – January 12, 1986) was a politician in Manitoba, Canada. He served in the Legislative Assembly of Manitoba from 1936 to 1949 as a representative of the Social Credit League, and was a cabinet minister in the governments of John Bracken and Stuart Garson.

The son of James N. R. Turnbull and Cecilia Scarth, Turnbull was educated at the Manitoba Agricultural College, and worked as a flour miller in Hamiota, Manitoba. In 1926, he married Ellen Grace Atkinson.

He was first elected to the Manitoba legislature in the 1936 provincial election, defeating Liberal-Progressive candidate J. Spalding by 222 votes in the Hamiota constituency. Turnbull was one of five Social Credit MLAs elected to the 55-member legislature.

The Manitoba Social Credit League had been created for the 1936 election following the unexpected victory of the Alberta Social Credit Party in that province's 1935 provincial election. The party's MLAs were monetary reformists, and were initially regarded as radicals. After the election, they surprised many in the province by providing support to Liberal-Progressive Premier John Bracken's minority government.

In 1940, Social Credit formally entered government as part of a four-party coalition, which also included the Liberal-Progressives, Conservatives and CCF. Although Turnbull did not lead the Social Credit caucus in the house, he was selected as the party's cabinet representative and was sworn into office on November 4, 1940, as a Minister without portfolio. He was the first Social Credit representative to receive a cabinet position anywhere in the world outside Alberta.

Turnbull was responsible for representing the Social Credit caucus in cabinet. It is not clear what influence, if any, he held over broader government policy.

The Social Credit Party split after the caucus's decision to enter government. In the 1941 provincial election, all of the party's pro-government candidates were re-elected while the opposition candidates were defeated. Turnbull was re-elected with an increased plurality, and remained in cabinet when Stuart Garson replaced John Bracken as Premier in 1943.

Easily re-elected in the 1945 election, Turnbull stepped down from his cabinet position on February 14, 1946. The only remaining Social Credits MLAs in the legislature by this time were Turnbull and Stanley Fox. The party was not represented in cabinet after Turnbull's resignation, although it continued to support the government.

The Social Credit Party did not field any candidates in the 1949 provincial election, and Turnbull did not seek re-election.
