= John Munn (Manitoba politician) =

Canadian politician

John Alfred Munn (April 13, 1882 — January 25, 1942) was a politician in Manitoba, Canada. He served in the Legislative Assembly of Manitoba from 1927 until his death.

Munn was born in Minnedosa, Manitoba, the son of John Munn and Catherine Patterson, and was educated at the Ontario Veterinary College and the McKillop Veterinary College of Chicago. He worked in Manitoba as a veterinarian. In 1911, Munn married Hazel Smith. He was mayor of Carman from 1919 to 1921. He served as secretary of the Dufferin Agricultural Society from 1923 to 1939 and was president of the Manitoba Federation of Agriculture in 1939 and 1940, retiring due to poor health.

He was first elected to the Manitoba legislature in the 1927 provincial election in the constituency of Dufferin. A Progressive, Munn served as a backbench supporter of John Bracken's government. He was re-elected in the 1932 provincial election over Conservative candidate A.B. Roblin.

The Progressives contested the 1932 election in an alliance with the Manitoba Liberal Party. This alliance was consolidated after the election, and government members became known as "Liberal-Progressives". Munn was re-elected until this banner in the provincial elections of 1936 and 1941.

He was returned by acclamation in the 1941 election, but died from a stroke at home in Carman the following year.
