= James Litterick =

Canadian communist politician

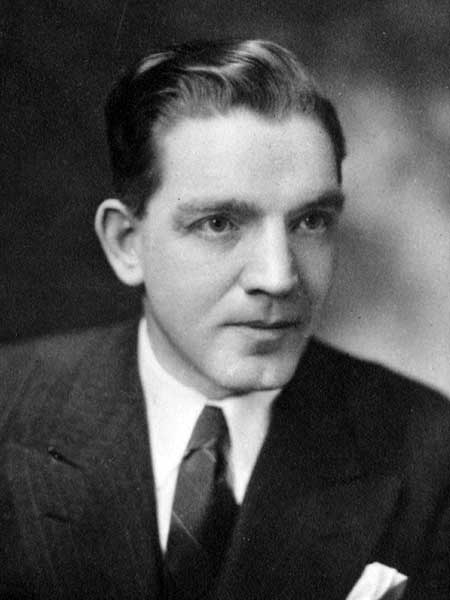
- Litterick, c. 1937–1940

Member of the Manitoba Legislative Assembly for Winnipeg
- In office 27 July 1936 – 1940

Personal details
- Born: 15 July 1901 Glasgow, Scotland
- Party: Communist Party of Manitoba
- Spouse: Molly Bassin (m. 1936)
- Profession: Politician
- Disappeared: Missing for 83 years, 3 months and 18 days
- Status: Uncertain

James Litterick (born 15 July 1901; date of death unknown) was a politician in Manitoba, Canada, and was the first member of the Communist Party of Canada to be elected to that province's legislature.

== Biography ==
=== Early life ===
Litterick was born on 15 July 1901, in Glasgow. He studied at Clydebrooke and Glasgow, and became a member of the British Socialist Party at age sixteen (his father was also a lifelong socialist). He was jailed for his role in a rent riot at Clydebank in 1920, and joined the newly formed Communist Party of Great Britain the same year.

=== Politics ===
Litterick moved to Canada in 1925 and initially worked as a miner in Alberta and British Columbia. In 1926, he became the district secretary of the Communist Party of British Columbia. He moved to Montreal in 1930, and became an organizer for the Workers Unity League, a Communist trade union umbrella designed to build a revolutionary trade union movement in Canada. When Communist Party leader Tim Buck was arrested in 1931, Litterick moved to Toronto to take over some of his responsibilities.

He soon moved to Winnipeg. In 1934, Litterick was selected as Provincial Secretary of the Communist Party of Manitoba.

He married Molly Bassin in 1936.

=== MLA: 1936–40 ===
He was elected to the Manitoba legislature in the provincial election of 1936, during a period of increased popularity for the party. His campaign focused on eliminating the province's 2% wage tax.

In that election, he was very popular among Winnipeg workers. He placed second, behind Independent Socialist Lewis Stubbs, on first-preference votes. Winnipeg at the time elected ten members via Single Transferable Voting. Stubbs was declared elected and on the second count, his surplus votes were transferred away. Litterick received enough votes from him to be declared elected.

Litterick regarded himself as an ally of Stubbs, a popular left-wing judge and Independent Socialist. Litterick's primary support base was in Winnipeg's working-class north end. He received considerable support from the city's Jewish community. (His wife, Molly, was Jewish.)

As MLA, he delivered a speech entitled "Whither Manitoba" in 1937. It was subsequently issued as a pamphlet.

Litterick was not a major figure in the national Communist Party. he did not play a significant public role in the party's national activities.

Because of his loyalty to Moscow, Litterick expressed changing views on Canada's involvement in World War II in late 1939. On 9 September, he urged both Premier John Bracken and Prime Minister William Lyon Mackenzie King to give full support to Poland against Nazi Germany's invasion. Litterick subsequently was required by the party to retract this position, and to oppose the war as an imperialist venture, in light of the Soviet Union's neutrality in the conflict at the time. (Later the CPC put their support behind the war after Germany invaded the Soviet Union in 1941.)

=== Later life ===
He was expelled from the Manitoba legislature in 1940, after the Communist Party was declared an illegal organization. He had already gone into hiding, apparently the subject of a Royal Canadian Mounted Police manhunt.

Information about Litterick's whereabouts after 1940 is limited. He appears in a photograph of Canada's wartime Communist Party leaders, apparently taken in Montreal in 1942. He surrendered to the RCMP in Toronto in 1942 and was interned in the Don Jail. In 1943, it was reported that he was working at a garment factory in Toronto.

In his book, Canadian Communism, Norman Penner writes, citing as his source his father Jacob Penner's personal notes, "After the war, Litterick was expelled from the Party for 'cowardice.'"

== See also ==
- List of people who disappeared
