= James Alexander Barry =

Canadian politician

James Alexander Barry (January 13, 1886 – May 21, 1950) was a politician in Manitoba, Canada. He served in the Legislative Assembly of Manitoba from 1936 to 1941 as a member of the Conservative Party.

Barry was born in Winnipeg, the son of Michael Joseph Barry and Ellen Curless, who had come to Manitoba from New Brunswick in 1879. He was educated at St. Mary's and Immaculate Conception Schools. Barry worked for the Canadian Pacific Railway as head clerk of the superintendent's office in Winnipeg. He served on Winnipeg city council from 1921 to 1925. In 1927, he married Delmar Erickson.

He first ran for the Manitoba legislature in the 1932 provincial election, in the constituency of Winnipeg. At the time, Winnipeg elected ten members via a single transferable ballot. Barry finished seventeenth on the first count, as was defeated on transfers.

He fared better in the 1936 election, finishing sixth on the first count and securing election on the sixteenth. The Conservatives lost this election to the Liberal-Progressives, and Barry served on the opposition benches for the next four years.

In 1940, the Conservatives joined with the Liberal-Progressives and two other parties in a wartime coalition government. Barry supported the coalition, and served as a government backbencher.

Running for re-election in the 1941 election, Barry finished ninth on the first count but fared poorly on transfers. He was eliminated after the eighteenth tally.

He died in Vancouver at the age of 64.
