= Stephen Krawchyk =

Canadian politician

Stephen Nicholas Krawchyk (January 1, 1903 — January 21, 1943) was a politician in Manitoba, Canada. He served in the Legislative Assembly of Manitoba from 1941 until his death.

The son of Nicholas Krawchyk and Anna Mylymonka, Krawchyk was born in Garland, Manitoba. He trained as a teacher in Winnipeg, and continued his education at Colorado State College and North Western University. He worked as a school principal for Brooklands School (later renamed Krawchyk School) and was particularly interested in educational questions during his time in parliament. He also served as finance chairman in the Municipal Council of Brooklands at one stage. In 1941, Krawchyk married Anne Wasko.

Krawchyk was elected to the Manitoba legislature in the 1941 provincial election. This election was called shortly after the formation of a four-party coalition government in the province. Krawchyk ran as a pro-coalition independent in the Winnipeg constituency, which elected ten members by a single transferable ballot. He finished fifth on the first count, and was declared elected on the nineteenth.

He died in Winnipeg two years after his election.
