= James Christie (Manitoba politician) =

Canadian politician

James Lyall Christie (June 9, 1891 – January 19, 1953) was a politician in Manitoba, Canada. He served in the Legislative Assembly of Manitoba as a Liberal-Progressive representative from 1932 until his death.

== Background ==
Christie was born and educated in Glenboro, Manitoba where he worked as a farmer. His father, also named James Christie, was an unsuccessful Liberal candidate in the 1914 provincial election. His mother was Annie Ferguson.

The younger James Christie served as the provincial director of Manitoba Livestock Producers Ltd. and was an official or member in several local farm associations as well as being an active freemason. He served as a soldier in France with the Motor Machine Gun Corps from 1916 to 1918 during World War I, and was wounded during the Arras-Cambrai drive.

== Career ==
He was first elected to the Manitoba legislature in the 1932 provincial election, defeating incumbent Conservative William H. Spinks by 256 votes in the Cypress constituency. In the 1936 election, he was re-elected over Conservative candidate R.G. Hurton by 129 votes. Christie again defeated Hurton, who was by this time an independent candidate, in the 1941 provincial election.

Christie's re-election in the 1945 provincial election occurred under unusual circumstances. During this period, the Liberal-Progressive Party was the dominant power in a coalition government which also included the Progressive Conservative Party, Social Credit and some independents. At a nomination meeting to determine the governing coalition's candidate, Christie unexpectedly lost to independent Robin Parsons by one vote. He challenged the validity of the result, however, and entered the general election as a candidate against Parsons. There were no further candidates, and Christie was easily elected over Parsons. He continued to sit with the Liberal-Progressives, on the government side.

He was re-elected again in the 1949 provincial election and was still a member of the legislature when he died in Glenboro in January 1953. His death followed a serious illness.

Christie served as whip of the Liberal-Progressive party for thirteen years. He was appointed chair of the standing committee on municipal affairs in 1949, and headed the provincial committee on agriculture and immigration from 1949 to 1952.
