= Huntly Ketchen =

Canadian general and politician (1872–1959)

Huntly Douglas Brodie Ketchen
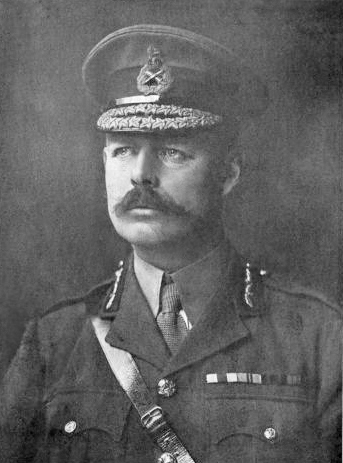
- Born: May 22, 1872
- Died: July 28, 1959 (aged 87)
- Military career
- Service years: 1890s–1929?
- Rank: Major General
- Conflicts: Second Boer War; First World War

Major General Huntly Douglas Brodie Ketchen, CB, CMG (May 22, 1872 – July 28, 1959) was a Canadian soldier and politician. He served in the Legislative Assembly of Manitoba as a Conservative representative from 1932 to 1945.

== Military career ==
Ketchen was born to a Scottish family living in Sholopore, India. His father, Major James Ketchen, served in the British Indian Army. The younger Ketchen was educated at Wellington College, Berkshire and the Royal Military College, Sandhurst, England, and was commissioned into the British Army as a second lieutenant in the Royal Inniskilling Fusiliers, but resigned after a couple of years. He came to Canada in 1894, serving for a time with the North-West Mounted Police. Following the outbreak of the Second Boer War, Ketchen volunteered for service with Lord Strathcona's Corps, a privately funded unit of Canadian soldiers, and was commissioned a lieutenant on 17 March 1900 as the corps embarked for South Africa.

He later saw active service in World War I, commanding the Sixth Canadian Infantry Brigade in France from 1915 to 1918.

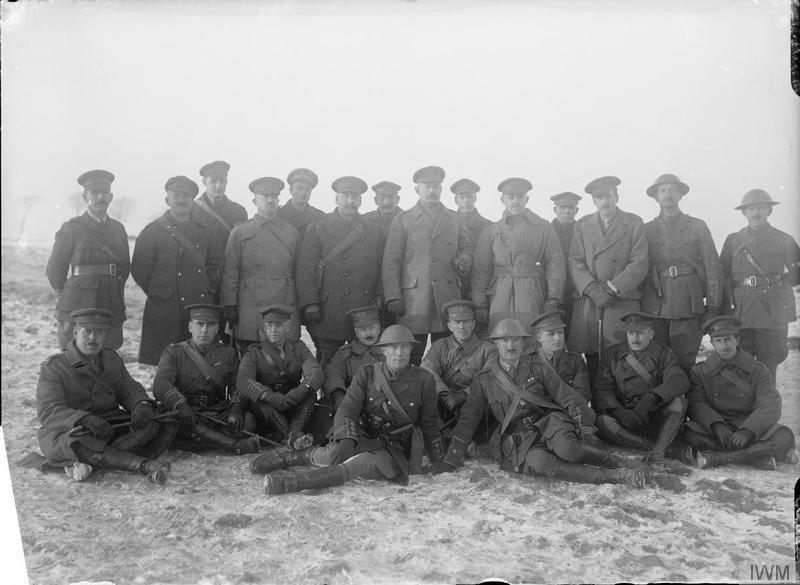
Canadian officers on the Western Front, including the 6th Brigade's commander, Brigadier-General Huntly Ketchen, December 1916

Brigadier-General Huntly Ketchen commanded the 6th Canadian Infantry Brigade during the First World War. He was heavily involved in several major, defining Western Front battles as part of the 2nd Canadian Division:Battle of St. Eloi Craters (April 1916): His brigade was ordered to hold muddy, vulnerable craters against intense German counterattacks, a costly engagement that resulted in heavy Canadian casualties.Battle of Vimy Ridge (April 1917): Ketchen led his brigade as the 2nd Canadian Division took heavily fortified German positions on the ridge.Battle of Hill 70 (August 1917): He participated in this highly successful Canadian Corps operation near Lens, France.Third Battle of the Scarpe (May 1917): His brigade launched an aggressive night assault to capture and secure the village of Fresnoy-en-Gohelle.

Ketchen, promoted to temporary brigadier general in June 1915, was nearly dismissed after being used as a scapegoat for following orders from the British in connection with the Battle of St-Eloi in April 1916. After British troops had taken a large crater near the ruins of the Belgian town of St Eloi, his brigade was ordered to hold the gain against German counter-attacks. Due to dreadful mismanagement of the Canadian forces by Ketchen and his divisional commander Richard Turner, German soldiers overran the crater, causing 1,400 Canadian casualties and retaking the land around the crater, negating the gains made at heavy cost just a few days before. General Sir Herbert Plumer, the commander of the Second Army who was responsible for the front, demanded Ketchen's immediate dismissal. When Turner claimed that if Ketchen was dismissed he would resign, the commander of the Canadian Corps, Lieutenant-General Alderson, sought Turner's dismissal as well. Both Turner and Ketchen were supporters of Militia Minister Sir Sam Hughes, who made it clear in no uncertain terms to Commander in Chief, Sir Douglas Haig, that if Turner went then Haig could no longer rely on Canadian support. This led to the diplomatic compromise of Alderson being relieved of his command and replaced by Julian Byng, while Turner and Ketchen retained their commands.

== Political career ==
Ketchen reached the rank of Major-General in the Canadian Army and retired on pension in 1929. From 1920 to 1923, he served as president of the Canadian Legion in Manitoba and was also president of the South Winnipeg Conservative Association. He was first elected to the Manitoba legislature in the 1932 provincial election for the constituency of Winnipeg, which elected ten members by a single transferable ballot. Ketchen finished seventh on the first ballot, and was declared elected. Running for re-election in the 1936 election, he finished eighth on the first ballot and was declared elected on the sixteenth count. The Conservative Party was the primary opposition party in Manitoba during this period, and Ketchen sat with his party caucus on the opposition benches. In 1940, the Conservative Party joined with the Liberal-Progressive Party and other parties in a coalition government. Ketchen initially sat as a government backbencher, but soon became disillusioned with the coalition arrangement. In the 1941 provincial election, he ran as a dissident Conservative opposing the coalition. He finished sixth on the first count, and was again declared elected on the sixteenth. The coalition supporters won 50 of 55 seats in the legislature in the 1941 election. Ketchen appears to have served as Leader of the Opposition in the legislature from 1941 to 1943. The Conservative Party remained a part of the coalition throughout the 1940s. Ketchen did not run for re-election in 1945. He died in hospital in Winnipeg at the age of 87.

He married, in 1905, Margaret Elizabeth Robinson.
