= John Lawrie =

Canadian politician

John Polworth Lawrie (August 25, 1875 in Edinburgh, Scotland – October 17, 1951) was a politician in Manitoba, Canada. He served in the Legislative Assembly of Manitoba from 1936 to 1949. Originally elected as a Conservative, he sat as a Progressive Conservative after the party changed its name.

Lawrie was educated in Edinburgh, and came to Canada in 1893. He worked as an implement dealer and insurance broker, also served as a police magistrate and commissioner. In 1907, he married May Clegg.

He was first elected to the Manitoba legislature in the 1936 provincial election, defeating incumbent Liberal-Progressive candidate John Muirhead by 82 votes in the constituency of Norfolk. The Conservatives were the primary opposition party in Manitoba during this period, and Lawrie sat with his party on the opposition benches.

In 1940, the Liberal-Progressives and Conservatives joined in a wartime coalition government. This arrangement did not prevent the parties from fielding candidates against one another in the 1941 election, however; Lawrie again faced John Muirhead, and won by only 44 votes. He served as a government backbencher for the remainder of his tenure in the legislature.

In the 1945 election, he defeated a candidate of the Cooperative Commonwealth Federation.

Lawrie did not run for re-election in 1949, and died in Carberry three years later.
