= Seymour Farmer =

Canadian politician (1878–1951)

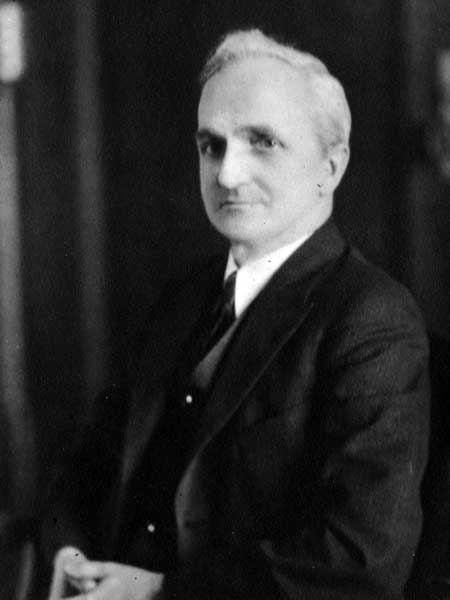
- Farmer c. 1932–1936

2nd Manitoba Minister of Labour
- In office 4 November 1940 – 19 December 1942
- Premier: John Bracken
- Preceded by: William Clubb
- Succeeded by: Errick Willis

Leader of the Manitoba Co-operative Commonwealth Federation
- In office 1936–1947
- Preceded by: new party
- Succeeded by: Edwin Hansford

Leader of the Manitoba Independent Labour Party
- In office 1935–1943
- Preceded by: John Queen
- Succeeded by: party dissolved

Winnipeg City Councillor
- In office 1928–1929

30th Mayor of Winnipeg
- In office 1923–1924
- Preceded by: Frank Oliver Fowler
- Succeeded by: Ralph Webb

Member of the Legislative Assembly of Manitoba
- In office 18 July 1922 – 10 November 1949
- Constituency: Winnipeg

Personal details
- Born: Seymour James Farmer; 20 June 1878 Cardiff, Wales
- Died: 16 January 1951 (aged 72) Winnipeg, Manitoba, Canada
- Party: Manitoba Independent Labour Party; Co-operative Commonwealth Federation

Seymour James Farmer (20 June 1878 – 16 January 1951) was a Georgist politician in Manitoba, Canada. He served as Winnipeg MLA from 1922 to 1949. During this time, he also served as mayor of Winnipeg 1923-1924 and later as city councillor in the late 1920s and in the 1930s. He was the leader of the Manitoba Co-operative Commonwealth Federation from 1935 to 1947. He served as a cabinet minister in Manitoba's World War II coalition government.

== Early life and career ==
Farmer was born in Cardiff, Wales, the son of Seymour Farmer and Bessie Alexander Sander, and was educated there. He moved to Canada in 1900 and worked as a railway clerk. He served as Fred Dixon's campaign manager in Dixon's unsuccessful 1910 bid for election to the Legislative Assembly of Manitoba. He worked as an accountant for the International Grain Company from 1913 to 1927.

Farmer married Lydia Gwendoline Ashton.

== Political career ==
An activist of the Direct Legislation movement, he authored the book The Reign of the People, The Case for Direct Legislation.

Along with Dixon, Farmer opposed conscription during World War I. During the Conscription Crisis of 1917, he was nominated by the No Conscription League to contest the federal riding of Winnipeg Centre in the 1917 federal election. He withdrew from the contest so as not to split the anti-conscriptionist vote between a Laurier Liberal and himself.

Farmer supported the Winnipeg General Strike. After the strike's end, he ran unsuccessfully for mayor in 1919 and 1920.

In December 1920, he was one of the founding members of Manitoba's Independent Labour Party (ILP). He considered running for the federal riding of Winnipeg Centre in the 1921 election, but withdrew in favour of J.S. Woodsworth.

Farmer was elected the 30th mayor of Winnipeg in 1922 and 1923. He did not have majority support from the city's councillors though. He was defeated by Ralph Webb in 1924.

He served as a city councillor in 1928, 1929, and again in the 1930s.

Farmer was also elected to the Manitoba legislature as a member for Winnipeg in the 1922 election, along with fellow ILP members Fred Dixon, John Queen and William Ivens. Winnipeg at the time was a 10-seat district electing MLAs through STV. He was re-elected in the 1927 and 1932 elections.

Farmer replaced Queen as party leader in 1935. Farmer's early years as party leader were marked by conflict between the ILP and the newly formed Co-operative Commonwealth Federation (CCF). In 1933, the ILP had affiliated with the CCF and agreed to support the CCF's skeletal network in the province. By 1936, the CCF had grown into a more powerful organization, and many ILP members were concerned about their autonomy. There were ideological differences between the two groups: the ILP was exclusively a labour party, while the CCF wanted to reach out to farmers as well.

For the provincial election of 1936, Farmer and other candidates campaigned under the "ILP-CCF" banner. The Social Credit movement, with its victory in Alberta under its sails, tried for success in Manitoba. Farmer responded by writing pamphlet "Social Credit or Social Ownership". In it he called for social ownership of utilities and industries and for a social dividend which was to be arrived at in different means than the social credit dividend espoused by Alberta premier William Aberhart. ILP/CCF increased their representation to seven seats.

After the election, a group of disgruntled ILP members forced a temporary disaffiliation from the CCF. Pressure from David Lewis and J. S. Woodsworth brought the two parties back in alignment, but their relationship remained tenuous.

At the start of World War II, Farmer approved of federal CCF leader Woodsworth's pacifist stance in the House of Commons of Canada. Farmer endorsed the CCF's call to conscript "wealth rather than men" for the war effort. Most of the ILP supported an all-out war effort, however. This exacerbated tensions between the groups. The ILP finally dissolved in 1943 after its internal operations had been taken over by CCF loyalists.

Throughout the 1930s, Manitoba premier John Bracken had attempted to bring the province's opposition parties into a "non-partisan" coalition government. Bracken's Progressives absorbed the provincial Liberals in 1932, but the other parties turned down his requests on two separate occasions. With the start of the war, however, "non-party" government became a more viable option. The Conservatives and Social Credit joined the government in 1940; despite opposition from David Lewis, Farmer convinced the CCF to do the same.

Farmer argued (somewhat dubiously) that Bracken was willing to adopt labour-friendly policies, and that the CCF would benefit more from joining government than from being the sole group in opposition. He also argued that an all-party government would defer the next provincial election for a year, ll and allow the CCF more time to organize. Lewis eventually resigned himself to the alliance, and the CCF entered Manitoba's government in late 1940. Farmer was the first member of a social democratic party in Canada to receive a cabinet portfolio and was sworn in as Minister of Labour on 4 November.

By any measurement, the CCF's tenure in government was a disaster for the party. While the Conservatives were fully integrated into the management of the province, Social Credit and the CCF were marginalized. Bracken forced Farmer's labour legislation to face free votes in the legislature, which soon took the form of party votes, with the CCF invariably on the losing side.

The Manitoba CCF was demoralized in the election of 1941. Keeping an earlier pledge, it contested only ten ridings and fell from seven to three members.

Support for the CCF rose nationally throughout 1942, and there was a growing desire among many in the Manitoba party to leave the coalition. Farmer resigned from cabinet in December 1942, and the CCF formally left the government the following year.

Farmer continued as party leader through the election of 1945. The campaign was a disappointment to the party; although it received more votes than the governing Liberal-Progressives (35% to 33%), it won only ten seats in the legislature. Farmer resigned as party leader in June 1947 and was replaced the following year by E.A. Hansford.

Farmer did not contest the election of 1949 and died on 16 January 1951.
