= Roland Fairbairn McWilliams =

Canadian politician (1874-1957)

The Honourable Roland Fairbairn McWilliams KC

13th Lieutenant Governor of Manitoba
- In office November 1, 1940 – August 1, 1953
- Monarchs: George VI; Elizabeth II
- Governors General: The Earl of Athlone; The Viscount Alexander of Tunis; Vincent Massey
- Premier: John Bracken; Stuart Garson; Douglas Lloyd Campbell
- Preceded by: William Johnston Tupper
- Succeeded by: John Stewart McDiarmid

Personal details
- Born: October 10, 1874 Peterborough, Ontario
- Died: December 10, 1957 (aged 83) Winnipeg, Manitoba, Canada
- Party: Ontario Liberal
- Spouse: Margaret May Stovel (m. 1903)
- Education: University of Toronto
- Profession: Lawyer

Roland Fairbairn McWilliams KC (October 10, 1874 – December 10, 1957) was a Canadian politician and office-holder. He served as the 13th Lieutenant Governor of Manitoba from 1940 to 1953.

== Life ==
McWilliams was born in Peterborough, Ontario. He received a Bachelor of Arts degree from the University of Toronto in 1896, and started his Bachelor of Laws degree at Osgoode Hall the following year. He subsequently worked as a barrister and solicitor. He campaigned for the Ontario Liberal Party in the 1905 provincial election at Peterborough West, where Conservative candidate Thomas Evans Bradburn defeated him.

In 1906, McWilliams was elected Mayor of Peterborough. He moved to Winnipeg, Manitoba in 1910, and continued to practice law for several years. He was also a leading organizer within YMCA, serving as its North American Vice President in 1923 and 1924, and as its Canadian leader from 1922 to 1929. He also served as the leader of Winnipeg's Town Planning Institute from 1925 to 1929. He visited the Soviet Union in 1926, and later wrote a book on the country's economic system under communism. He does not appear to have sought political office in Manitoba, though his wife, Margaret, was a respected Winnipeg municipal councillor for several years.

McWilliams was appointed as Manitoba's Lt. Governor on November 1, 1940, and held the position until August 1, 1953. Governor General Alexander Cambridge, the Earl of Athlone, appointed him on the recommendation of Prime Minister William Lyon Mackenzie King. The position was largely ceremonial. A strict temperance follower, McWilliams forbade the serving of alcohol at Government House for the entirely of his time in office. He died at Winnipeg, Manitoba, aged 83, in 1957.

McWilliams was also a champion rugby union player in his youth, and won the Dominion title with the University of Toronto Juniors in 1893.
