= Stanley Fox =

Canadian politician

Stanley William Fox (June 22, 1906 – March 22, 1984) was a politician in Manitoba, Canada, who served as the first leader of the Manitoba Social Credit Party, a party that supported the social credit theories of monetary reform.

The son of Thomas A. Fox and Flora McQuarrie, Fox was born in Balmoral, Manitoba. He was educated at the University of Manitoba and the Manitoba Medical College. He subsequently practiced as a doctor. He reached the rank of captain in the Canadian Army Medical Corps.

In Manitoba's 1936 provincial election, Fox was elected as a Social Credit candidate in the riding of Gilbert Plains. The newly formed party did not have a leader during the election, and Fox was subsequently chosen to head its parliamentary caucus.

Soon after being chosen as leader, Fox offered to support the government of Liberal-Progressive Premier John Bracken, who had been reduced to a minority and was unable to find allies elsewhere. There were some discussions for a formal coalition, but these came to nothing, and Social Credit supported the minority government from the outside until 1940.

Fox stepped down as the party's parliamentary leader in 1937, in favour of S.E. Rogers. He supported Social Credit's decision to join the government in 1940, and was re-elected in 1941 and 1945.

In 1937, Fox was charged with performing an illegal operation on Miss Alice Bosnell. However, charges were dropped because Bosnell, married to Dr. Fox earlier that year, could not be compelled to testify against her husband.

Fox planned to run for re-election in the 1949 campaign, but lost the coalition nomination to Ray Mitchell of the Liberal-Progressive Party. He did not return to political life afterwards, and died on March 22, 1984.
