= Evelyn Shannon =

Canadian politician

Evelyn Foster Shannon (September 14, 1890 – died January 28, 1973) was a politician in Manitoba, Canada. He served in the Legislative Assembly of Manitoba as a Liberal-Progressive representative from 1936 to 1945.
