= Lewis Stubbs =

Canadian politician

Lewis St. George Stubbs (June 14, 1878 – May 12, 1958) was a prominent judge and politician in Manitoba, Canada. He served in the Legislative Assembly of Manitoba from 1936 to 1949 as an Independent, He promoted left-wing and socially progressive causes including Henry George's Single Tax (Georgism).

== Early life ==
The son of Alfred Stubbs and Mary P. Durham, Stubbs was born on the island of Cockburn Harbour in the Turks and Caicos Islands, in the British West Indies. His family were wealthy colonial settlers whose ancestors had abandoned Georgia during the American Revolution; Stubbs later described them as "real Tories, the old-fashioned kind". Stubbs was educated at York Castle in Jamaica and St. Chad's College in Staffordshire, England. In 1898, he enrolled to study medicine at Christ's College, Cambridge University, and intended to become a medical missionary in Africa.

In 1899, Stubbs enlisted as a private in the British Army to fight in the Second Boer War. He quickly became disillusioned with both military life and the cause for which he was fighting, and never spoke of his participation with any enthusiasm in later life. He abandoned his medical research on returning to England, and sought a new calling.

== Life in Manitoba ==
In 1902, Stubbs moved to Deleau (near Brandon) Manitoba to work as a farmhand. He moved to Winnipeg later in the year; although initially planning to move to British Columbia, he chose to remain in the city after meeting Mary Wilcox, later his wife. He became a law student, and struck up a friendship with Fred Dixon, later a prominent labourist politician in the city. Stubbs himself had by this point converted to philosophical liberalism. Stubbs was called to the Manitoba bar in 1906.

In 1908, he opened a legal practice in Birtle, where he also worked as a farmer. During the federal election of 1917, Stubbs was one of the few public figures in the community to oppose conscription and the government of Robert Borden.

== Political career ==
In the 1921 federal election, Stubbs ran as the Liberal candidate in the riding of Marquette against Thomas Crerar, leader of the Progressive Party. He held no illusions of winning, and indeed finished a distant third with only 553 votes (against 9873 for Crerar). He was rewarded for his services by Liberal Prime Minister William Lyon Mackenzie King on May 20, 1922, being appointed a County Court Judge in the Eastern Judicial District of Manitoba. On July 4, 1924, he became a Senior County Court Judge.

As a judge, Stubbs often provoked controversy with Manitoba and Canada governments. A strict temperance man himself, Stubbs insisted that the province's prohibition laws be followed to the letter. He also rendered several judgments that excoriated the capitalist system, lamenting the punishment of petty criminals while corrupt plutocrats operated above the law.

Stubbs was also criticized by some in government for granting unduly lenient sentences. In 1932 he was the subject of a Royal Commission of inquiry into his judicial conduct. Many regarded the inquiry as a politically motivated farce. Stubbs was found guilty of judicial misbehaviour. The final report indicated that he was temperamentally unfit to hold office. Though removed from the bench, his cause was supported by many ordinary Manitobans, particularly those on the political left.

In late 1933, Stubbs ran for the House of Commons of Canada a second time, this time for the newly formed Cooperative Commonwealth Federation in the Saskatchewan riding of Mackenzie. He was the first CCF-er to run for federal office. His candidacy was opposed by others on the left, and the United Farmers's Unity League ran a candidate against him. Stubbs was also criticized for bringing his personal controversies into the campaign. His religious beliefs were questioned by some (originally an Anglican, Stubbs became a secular humanist in later years). His former ally William Lyon MacKenzie King campaigned against him. Stubbs was defeated by Liberal John Angus MacMillan by 1614 votes.

Notwithstanding this setback, Stubbs ran as an Independent candidate in Manitoba's 1936 provincial election. He ran in the riding of Winnipeg, which at the time elected ten members by Single transferable voting. His popular support was massive. He received a record 24,815 votes on the first count, more than three times what was needed to be declared elected and almost 20,000 more than his nearest opponent, Communist James Litterick.

Stubbs was a member of the left-opposition in parliament, opposing the Liberal-Progressive government of John Bracken. Although frequently a political ally of Litterick, he was unwilling to follow political directives from the U.S.S.R. and never entertained the possibility of joining the Communist Party. He supported the Mackenzie-Papineau Battalion in the Spanish Civil War, and often dismissed the CCF as an ineffective opposition.

There were rumours that Stubbs would run in the 1940 federal election against CCF incumbent MP Abraham Albert Heaps, but he declined in the interests of unity among "progressive" politicians. He was a strong supporter of the full mobilization for Canadian forces in World War II, and condemned the Communist Party's volte-face on the issue following the Hitler-Stalin non-aggression pact of October 7, 1939. The CP was declared illegal at this time and Winnipeg CP MLA James Litterick was expelled from the legislature.

The remaining political parties in the Manitoba Legislature (Liberal-Progressive, Conservative, CCF and Social Credit) formed a united coalition ministry. Stubbs labelled the coalition as a monstrosity. He was for a time the only opposition MLA in the assembly. Later two coalition MLAs left the government to sit alongside him.

Stubbs was re-elected in the 1941 election, although without the massive vote totals of previous elections (he finished second on the first count, behind Liberal-Progressive candidate John McDiarmid). After this, Stubbs frequently called for electoral reform in Manitoba, noting that the voters in the province's urban centres were under-represented in comparison to voters in the rural districts.

He was asked to run against Stanley Knowles in Winnipeg North Centre in the 1945 federal election, but again declined.

He was re-elected in the 1945 election, but again with diminished support. AS MLA he supported CCF MLA Morris Gray's efforts to increase provincial old-age pensions, and again spoke in favour of electoral reform. His efforts resulted in the break-up of the 10-member city district of Winnipeg and its replacement by three four-member districts (although it was not necessary to break up the Winnipeg district to give the city more seats. Some STV elections fill 21 seats at one time.)

Stubbs did not run for re-election in 1949. Perhaps this was because he did not want to be seen to be trying to benefit from the redistricting.

He did run in the next election. He was a candidate in the four-member district of Winnipeg Centre in the 1953 provincial election. The election was held using STV. Stubbs was unsuccessful, placing fifth in the first count and not accumulating enough votes through transfers to overtake those who were more popular.

== Later life ==
He returned to his law practice after leaving political life. Stubbs died on May 12, 1958.
