= John Poole (Canadian politician) =

Canadian politician

John Silas Poole (June 25, 1872 in Kemptville, Ontario – December 29, 1963) was a politician in Manitoba, Canada. He served in the Legislative Assembly of Manitoba from 1936 to 1949. Initially as a Conservative, he became a Progressive Conservative in 1943 when the party changed its name.

== Biography ==
The son of William Poole and Isabella Cranstoun, Poole was educated at Kemptville and in Winnipeg, Manitoba. He worked as a physician, and was president of the Manitoba Medical Association and College of Physicians and Surgeons. Poole also served on the Dominion Medical Council. In 1905, he married Mary Elizabeth McFadden.

Poole first sought election to the Manitoba election in the 1932 provincial election, but lost to Progressive incumbent Adalbert Poole in the constituency of Beautiful Plains. He ran again in the 1936 election, and defeated Adalbert Poole by 183 votes.

In 1940, the Conservative Party of Manitoba joined with the Liberal-Progressives and smaller parties in a coalition government. Poole initially sat as a government backbencher, but left the coalition prior to the 1941 provincial election. Re-elected by acclamation as an anti-coalition Conservative, he returned to his party caucus after the election.

He again defeated Adalbert Poole, who was by this time a candidate of the Cooperative Commonwealth Federation, in the 1945 provincial election. He served as a government backbencher supporting the coalition, and did not seek re-election in 1949.
