= Fairford (electoral district) =

Defunct provincial electoral district in Manitoba, Canada

Fairford is a former provincial electoral district in Manitoba, Canada. It was created for the 1920 provincial election, and eliminated with the 1958 election.

Stuart Garson, who served as Premier of Manitoba from 1943 to 1948, represented this constituency for a number of years.

== Members of the Legislative Assembly ==
Name	Party	Took office	Left office
Albert Kirvan	Liberal	1920	1927
Stuart Garson	Progressive	1927	1932
	Liberal–Progressive	1932	1948
James Anderson	Liberal–Progressive	1948	1958

== See also ==
- List of Manitoba provincial electoral districts
- Canadian provincial electoral districts
