= Stuart Garson =

Canadian politician and lawyer (1898-1977)

The Honourable Stuart Garson PC CC QC
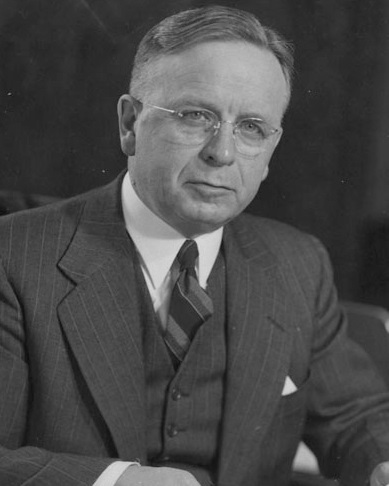

12th Premier of Manitoba
- In office January 14, 1943 – November 13, 1948
- Monarch: George VI
- Lieutenant Governor: Roland F. McWilliams
- Preceded by: John Bracken
- Succeeded by: Douglas Lloyd Campbell

Member of the Legislative Assembly of Manitoba for Fairford
- In office June 28, 1927 – November 13, 1948
- Preceded by: Albert Kirvan
- Succeeded by: James Anderson

Member of Parliament for Marquette
- In office December 20, 1948 – June 10, 1957
- Preceded by: James Allison Glen
- Succeeded by: Nick Mandziuk

Personal details
- Born: Stuart Sinclair Garson; December 1, 1898 St. Catharines, Ontario, Canada
- Died: May 5, 1977 (aged 78) Winnipeg, Manitoba, Canada
- Party: Federal: Liberal; Provincial: Progressive (1927-1932); Liberal-Progressive (1932-1948)
- Spouse: Emily Topper (m. 1933)
- Relations: William Garson (father)
- Children: 2 daughters
- Education: University of Manitoba
- Occupation: lawyer
- Profession: politician
- Cabinet: Provincial Treasurer (1936–1948); Minister Manitoba Power Commission (1940–1944); Minister Public Utilities (1941–1944); President of the Council (1943–1948); Minister Dominion-Provincial Relations (1943–1948); Solicitor General of Canada (1950–1952); Minister of Justice and Attorney General of Canada (1948–1957)

Stuart Sinclair Garson PC CC QC (December 1, 1898 – May 5, 1977) was a Canadian politician and lawyer. He served as the 12th premier of Manitoba from 1943 to 1948, and later became a Federal cabinet minister.

== Life and career ==
Born in St. Catharines, Ontario, the son of William Garson and Margaret Annable, Garson came to Manitoba with his parents in 1901. He received a Bachelor of Law degree from the University of Manitoba in 1918 and was called to the bar a year later. He practised law in Ashern, Manitoba, from 1919 to 1928. Garson was first elected to the Legislative Assembly of Manitoba for the riding of Fairford in 1927 as a Progressive, defeating incumbent Liberal Albert Kirvan. He defeated again Kirvan in 1932, and faced only minor competition for the remainder of his time in the Manitoba legislature. In early 1932, Garson was one of the founding members of the province's Liberal-Progressive coalition.

Garson was sworn in as provincial Treasurer on September 21, 1936. He also became minister of the Manitoba Power Commission on November 4, 1940, and Minister of Public Utilities on May 15, 1941. He continued to hold all of these positions after succeeding John Bracken as Premier on January 14, 1943. He resigned the MPC and Utilities portfolios in 1944.

Garson's government was perhaps slightly more interventionist than those of Bracken and his eventual successor Douglas Campbell. Garson's ministry began a program of rapid rural electrification, and made some effort to service the needs of returning soldiers after World War II. All the same, he rejected demands from the Manitoba Co-operative Commonwealth Federation to introduce programs in public housing and old-age pensions.

Under Garson's leadership, the "Liberal-Progressive" alliance became a united party—albeit one that was dominated by former Progressive politicians. His ministry also retained close ties to the federal Liberal government of William Lyon Mackenzie King.

Garson moved to federal politics in 1948, at the behest of new Liberal Prime Minister Louis St. Laurent. On November 15, 1948, Garson was sworn in as Minister of Justice and Attorney General; he was elected to the federal parliament in a by-election for the rural seat of Marquette the next month. For the next nine years, Garson would be the dominant cabinet minister from Manitoba in St. Laurent's government. He also served as Solicitor General of Canada from August 7, 1950, to October 14, 1952.

As Minister of Justice, he took the extraordinary step of referring a question to the Supreme Court of Canada that effectively asked the Court to rehear Wilbert Coffin's murder appeal. Coffin had been sentenced to death. Justice Douglas Abbott had earlier refused leave to appeal, and the Court affirmed that decision on the narrow technical ground that it lacked jurisdiction to vary the application judge's decision. In the resulting reference, the Court held 5–2 that the appeal would fail. Coffin was executed three weeks later.

Garson lost his seat in 1957, the year that Progressive Conservative leader John Diefenbaker formed a minority government. Indeed, Diefenbaker's Tories won victory mainly by ousting many Liberal MPs from the Prairies, including Garson. He retired from political life. In 1971, he was made a Companion of the Order of Canada.
