= Independent Labour Party (Manitoba, 1920) =

The Independent Labour Party was the leading social-democratic party in the Canadian province of Manitoba prior to the emergence of the Co-operative Commonwealth Federation. Several of its candidates were elected to the Legislative Assembly of Manitoba and it counted federal Members of Parliament J. S. Woodsworth and A. A. Heaps among its members.

The ILP was founded in December 1920 by disgruntled members of the Dominion Labour Party, who left that organization when it was taken over by rightist elements. Like the DLP, the ILP was a reformist labour group, and often had hostile relations with parties further to the left. In the provincial election of 1920, the combined efforts of reformist labourites and socialists resulted in eleven leftists being elected to the Manitoba legislature. Most of these Members of the Legislative Assembly (MLAs), including parliamentary leader Fred Dixon, were part of the exodus from the DLP to the ILP later in the year.

The ILP took six seats in the election of 1922, and Dixon resigned from the legislature in 1923 following a family tragedy. He was replaced as party leader by John Queen, formerly of the Social Democratic Party of Canada. Support for left-wing and labour parties declined throughout Canada in the late 1920s. Queen led the ILP through the elections of 1927, winning three seats.

The party's fortunes improved during the Depression, and the ILP took five seats in 1932. Seymour Farmer became leader of the ILP in 1935.

The ILP never affiliated with the Canadian Labour Party. Initially, this was because the rightist DLP leadership had affiliated itself with the CLP soon after the exodus of ILP members. There were attempts at a compromise, but divisions between DLP and ILP members were too strong to overcome and the ILP refused to join the "national" organization as such. Later, the ILP would remain out of the CLP due to the large number of communists who joined the latter group in the 1920s. (The CLP was, in any case, a fairly weak organization in Manitoba, and the ILP leaders had little incentive to merge with their smaller rival.)

The ILP had a complicated relationship with the Co-operative Commonwealth Federation (CCF) in the 1930s. The CCF was formed in 1932 to expand the parliamentary left's support base beyond the urban working class, and many in the ILP were suspicious of this. The parties nevertheless became aligned in 1933, at a time when the CCF organization in the province was weak. In three years, the CCF had developed its own identity and was less willing to support the ILP's demands for autonomy.

The party was referred to as "ILP-CCF" during the provincial election of 1936, against the opposition of some traditional ILP supporters. Following the election (in which the party won seven seats), a group of disgruntled ILP members succeeded in temporarily disaffiliating the parties. Pressure from David Lewis and J. S. Woodsworth brought about a realignment, but the ILP's relationship with the CCF remained shakey until the early 1940s, when CCF loyalists took over the ILP's internal organization. These divisions were especially noticeable at the start of the Second World War: the ILP supported an all-out war effort, whereas the CCF favoured conscription of "wealth before men".

The ILP organization officially disbanded in 1943. It had been superseded by the CCF some time earlier.

== Party leaders ==
1. Fred Dixon 1921–1923
2. John Queen 1923–1935
3. Seymour Farmer 1935–1943

All leaders were selected by party caucus, seemingly without opposition.

== See also ==
- Labour candidates and parties in Canada
- List of political parties in Manitoba
- Manitoba Labour Party
- Winnipeg Labour Party
