= Manitoba Social Credit Party =

Formal provincial party in Manitoba

The Manitoba Social Credit Party (originally the Manitoba Social Credit League) was a political party in the Canadian province of Manitoba. In its early years, it espoused the monetary reform theories of social credit.

It was formed in the 1935–1936, shortly after William Aberhart's supporters formed a Social Credit government in Alberta. While the party never won many seats in the Legislative Assembly of Manitoba, it maintained a presence in the legislature for most of the period from 1936 to 1973.

== Origins ==
In its earliest years, the Social Credit League took the form of a populist protest movement. Like other Social Credit parties in Canada, it eventually became as a party of conservatism while retaining an anti-establishment message. The party's leadership was consistently anti-socialist.

The Social Credit Party ran 19 candidates in the provincial election of 1936, five of whom were elected. It did not have a leader during the election, but chose Stanley Fox to lead the parliamentary group shortly thereafter. During this period, the party supported the monetary reforms of Major Douglas, which Aberhart had been promoting in Alberta for several years.

The 1936 election produced a minority government, with 23 Liberal-Progressives, 16 Conservatives, 7 Independent Labour Party members, the 5 Social Crediters and 4 others. After early talks for a Liberal-Progressive/Conservative coalition broke down, the Social Crediters made a surprise offer to keep the outgoing Liberal-Progressive government of John Bracken in power. Some party members may have hoped for a formal coalition, but this came to nothing and the party supported the government from the outside for the next four years.

Fox stepped down as party leader in 1937, and was replaced by S.E. Rogers.

== World War II and coalition ==
After the start of World War II, Bracken promoted a "non-partisan government" for Manitoba, in which all four major parties would hold cabinet portfolios in a demonstration of provincial unity. The plan was approved by the other parties, and Social Credit joined the government in late 1940. Social Credit Member of the Legislative Assembly (MLA) Norman Turnbull was sworn in as a minister without portfolio on November 4, 1940, and served in this capacity until February 14, 1946.

The decision to join government caused a split in the party. Salome Halldorson crossed the floor to sit as an Opposition Social Credit MLA and won the support of Alberta Socred Premier Ernest Manning as well as the Manitoba Social Credit League which officially expelled the four Social Credit MLAs who supported the government. Nevertheless, in the election of 1941, several Social Credit candidates ran in opposition to the coalition, while coalition supporters continued to call themselves Social Credit candidates. This division damaged the party's credibility with the electorate, and only three Social Credit candidates were elected: Fox, Turnbull and Rogers (all government supporters).

== Decline ==
The party does not seem to have had a leader in the parliament which followed, and in fact became little more than an appendage of the Liberal-Conservative coalition as the 1940s progressed. Fox and Turnbull were re-elected in the 1945 election, but the party ran only two other candidates in the rest of the province. It completely lost its coherence as a parliamentary force in the late 1940s, and did not run any candidates in the 1949 election.

The Social Credit Party re-emerged for the election of 1953: William Bullmore was elected in the constituency of Dauphin, and Gilbert Hutton won in Minnedosa. The party was again marginalized in the parliament which followed, however, and none of its candidates were elected in the provincial elections of 1958 and 1959. Although the Social Credit parties of Alberta and British Columbia had largely abandoned their monetary policies by this time, Bullmore and Hutton continued to promote social credit during their time in parliament.

During the late 1940s and the 1950s, the President of the Manitoba Social Credit League was Wilbert James Tinkler. He was the closest that the party had to an official leader in this period, as neither Bullmore nor Hutton held an official role in the legislature. Tinkler ran for federal and provincial office on six occasions.

Tinkler became the president of the Social Credit league at a time when it had only a minimal presence in the legislature, and a weak provincial organization. The party had joined the governing coalition of Premier John Bracken in 1940, and its parliamentary representation was subsequently regarded as little more than an adjunct to the province's Liberal-Conservative government. Several figures within the party had campaigned against the alliance in 1941, but all were defeated. The party's organization subsequently collapsed, and it offered no candidates for election in 1949.

Social Credit did not have an official political leader between 1941 and at least 1959. Tinkler, as its leading official for most of this period, was not a prominent public figure, though he did help reconstruct some semblance of a provincial network for the party. He was replaced as party president by S.S. Hunt of Dauphin in late June 1953, but appears to have regained this title later in the decade. Tinkler continued to work in the party after Jacob Froese became its official leader following the 1959 election.

== Later years ==
The party received another lease on life in November 1959, when Jacob Froese won a by-election in the riding of Rhineland. Froese remained a member of the legislature until the 1973 election, when he was defeated by a Progressive Conservative candidate. The party was unable to win any other seats, however, and Froese effectively acted as an independent MLA during his time in parliament. He served as party leader for most, if not all of the period from 1959 to 1977. Froese was sometimes called the "conscience of parliament", and does not appear to have endorsed his party's original views on monetary reform.

The Manitoba Social Credit Party ran five candidates in the 1977 election, all of whom fared poorly. Even Froese was reduced to a fourth-place finish in Rhineland. In the 1981 election, the party announced that it would not run any candidates. Froese was by this time a member of Sidney Green's Progressive Party.

The party seems to have dissolved itself shortly thereafter.

== See also ==
- List of Manitoba political parties
- List of Manitoba general elections
- Social Credit Party of Canada
- Canadian social credit movement
