= John Bracken =

Premier of Manitoba from 1922 to 1943

The Honourable John Bracken PC
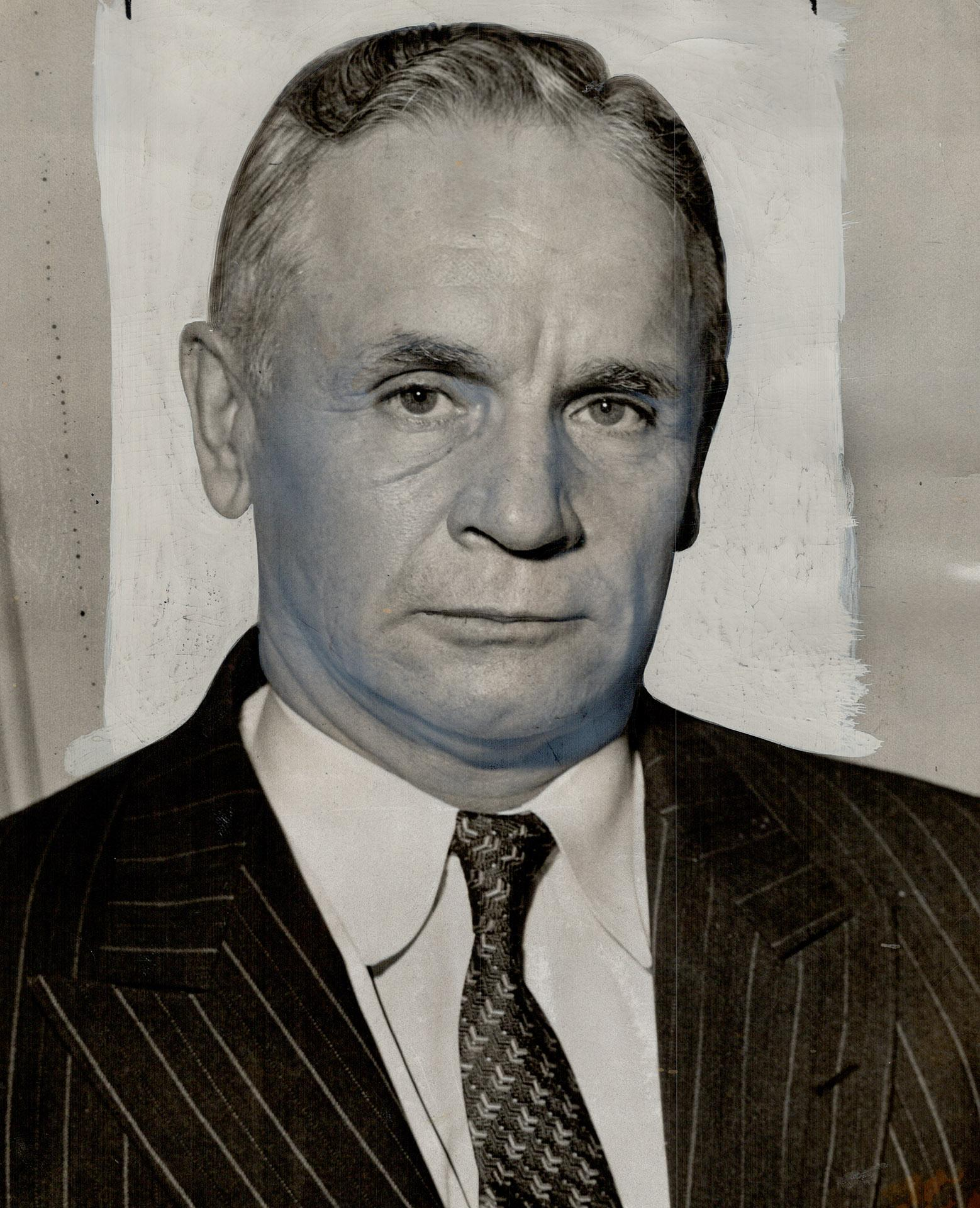
- Bracken in 1947

Leader of the Opposition
- In office 11 June 1945 – 20 July 1948
- Preceded by: Gordon Graydon
- Succeeded by: George A. Drew

Leader of the Progressive Conservative Party of Canada
- In office 11 December 1942 – 20 July 1948
- Preceded by: Arthur Meighen
- Succeeded by: George A. Drew

Member of Parliament for Neepawa
- In office 11 June 1945 – 27 June 1949
- Preceded by: Frederick Donald Mackenzie
- Succeeded by: Riding abolished

11th Premier of Manitoba
- In office 8 August 1922 – 14 January 1943
- Monarchs: George V Edward VIII; George VI
- Lieutenant Governor: James A. M. Aikins; Theodore A. Burrows; James D. McGregor; William J. Tupper; Roland F. McWilliams
- Preceded by: Tobias Norris
- Succeeded by: Stuart Garson

Member of the Legislative Assembly of Manitoba for The Pas
- In office 5 October 1922 – 14 January 1943
- Preceded by: Edward Brown
- Succeeded by: Beresford Richards

Personal details
- Born: 22 June 1883 Ellisville, Ontario, Canada
- Died: 18 March 1969 (aged 85) Ottawa, Ontario, Canada
- Party: Progressive Conservative (federal); Progressive Party of Manitoba (provincial)
- Spouse: Alice Wylie Bruce (m. 1909)
- Children: 4
- Education: Ontario Agricultural College (BSA); University of Illinois
- Occupation: Professor; Farmer; Author
- Cabinet: President of the Council (1922–1943); Minister of Education (1922–1923); Provincial Lands Commissioner (1922–1923); Railway Commissioner (1922–1923, 1935–1940); Minister of Agriculture (1923–1925, 1936); Provincial Treasurer (1925–1932); Minister of Public Utilities (1927–1928); Minister of Mines & Natural Resources (1928–1930); Provincial Secretary (1935–1939); Minister Manitoba Power Commission (1936–1940); Minister, Dom. Prov. Relations (1939–1940, 1941–1943)

John Bracken PC (22 June 1883 – 18 March 1969) was a Canadian agronomist and politician who was the 11th and longest-serving premier of Manitoba (1922–1943) and later the leader of the Progressive Conservative Party of Canada (1942–1948).

Bracken was born in Ontario, and was a professor of animal husbandry at the University of Saskatchewan before moving to Manitoba in 1920. A political outsider, he was named leader of the Progressive Party of Manitoba following its upset victory in the 1922 Manitoba general election. During his tenure as premier of Manitoba, he implemented policies dominated by rural interests and opposed organized labour. He oversaw the creation of a universal pension, the provincial income tax, and reductions in spending on health, education and welfare as well as the replacement of the first past the post voting system with alternative voting. He pursued development by promoting staple industries such as mining, timber and fishing. After leading the Progressive Party to a second consecutive majority in the 1927 election, he merged the Progressive Party with the Liberal Party of Manitoba to form the Liberal-Progressive Party in 1932. He led the Liberal-Progressive Party to consecutive victories in elections in 1932, 1936 and 1941, winning majority governments in all but the 1936 election.

In 1942, he agreed to run for the leadership of the federal Conservative Party of Canada at the condition that the party be renamed the Progressive Conservative Party of Canada. After being elected leader of the newly renamed party, he resigned as premier of Manitoba and led the PCs to a second-place finish during the 1945 Canadian federal election against the incumbent Liberal Party government led by Prime Minister William Lyon Mackenzie King. He resigned as leader of the party in 1948 and was succeeded by George A. Drew. After being defeated while running for reelection to the House of Commons in the 1949 federal election, he retired from politics and died in 1969.

== Early life ==
Bracken was born in Ellisville, Ontario, the son of Ephriam Michael Bracken and Alberta Gilbert. He was raised on a large dairy farm and began managing it as a teenager. He and was educated at Brockville Collegiate Institute and the Ontario Agricultural College. He did a year of postgraduate work at the University of Illinois.

Not long after graduating from the Ontario Agricultural College, Bracken moved to Manitoba, where he worked for the Dominion Seed Branch. When Saskatchewan became a province in 1905, Bracken became its first inspector of institutes and fairs. He also spent two years as the province's livestock commissioner. In 1909, he married Alice Wylie Bruce.

Bracken was chosen to be one of the first professors of the University of Saskatchewan's agricultural college, which opened in 1910. He was head coach of the school's football team in 1915 and 1917. In 1920, he moved to Winnipeg when he became president of the Manitoba Agricultural College.

== Premier of Manitoba ==
In 1922, the United Farmers of Manitoba unexpectedly won the provincial election. The UFM's expectations had been so low going into the election that they had not even named a leader and ran candidates in only two thirds of the seats.

With their upset victory, the UFM faced the task of naming a leader who would become the province's new premier. After federal MPs Thomas Crerar and Robert Hoey turned down the UFM's offer, they turned to Bracken, who accepted. His selection was a surprise, as he had never sought public office and had not been identified with the party prior to becoming its leader. He was sworn in as premier on August 8 and entered the legislature a few months later after winning a deferred election in the northern riding of The Pas.

Bracken was a political outsider and gave the UFM the professional grounding it needed. The United Farmers generally rejected the partisanship of the Liberal and Conservative parties and favoured government policies based on independence and principles of business management. The UFM governed as the Progressive Party of Manitoba, and Bracken served as Manitoba's premier for over 20 years.

Bracken's government was, in most respects, conservative and cautious. It was dominated by rural interests, who controlled the Legislative Assembly of Manitoba. The first past the post voting system used in rural single-member districts was replaced by alternative voting during his government's reign. Labour did not fare well under Bracken's leadership; he had little sympathy for the leaders of the Winnipeg General Strike and once fired a number of government workers to show his independence from organized labour.

In the 1920s, Bracken oversaw an increase in taxation and created the provincial income tax. He lowered expenditures in health, education, and welfare but introduced a pension for all citizens over seventy years old in 1928. Under his administration, the province created a censorship board that regulated motion pictures. In 1923, Manitoba voted to end the prohibition of alcohol. The restrictive Liquor Control Act, passed that same year, sold liquor at provincially controlled outlets, resulting in the generation of a substantial new income.

Bracken worked to promote staple industries such as mining, timber cutting, and fishing, while also promoting hydroelectric power. He successfully had the Hudson Bay Railway create a branch line to Flin Flon, resulting in the opening of a copper and zinc mine there in 1926. Bracken was a vocal proponent of the provincial control of natural resources and influenced Mackenzie King's 1930 decision to give Manitoba, Alberta, and Saskatchewan control over crown lands.

In keeping with the UFM's "anti-party" philosophy, Bracken favoured non-partisan government. In 1931, his Progressives formed an alliance with the Manitoba Liberal Party, and the two parties eventually merged into one. In 1940, Bracken formed a wartime coalition government that included the Conservative, Co-operative Commonwealth Federation (CCF) and Social Credit parties.

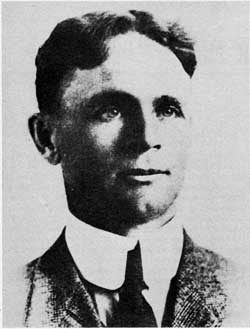
Bracken at a young age

When Bracken left provincial politics in 1943, there were only 5 opposition Members of the Legislative Assembly (MLAs) in a 57-member parliament. His coalition remained intact until 1950 although the CCF left in 1943.

== Federal politics ==
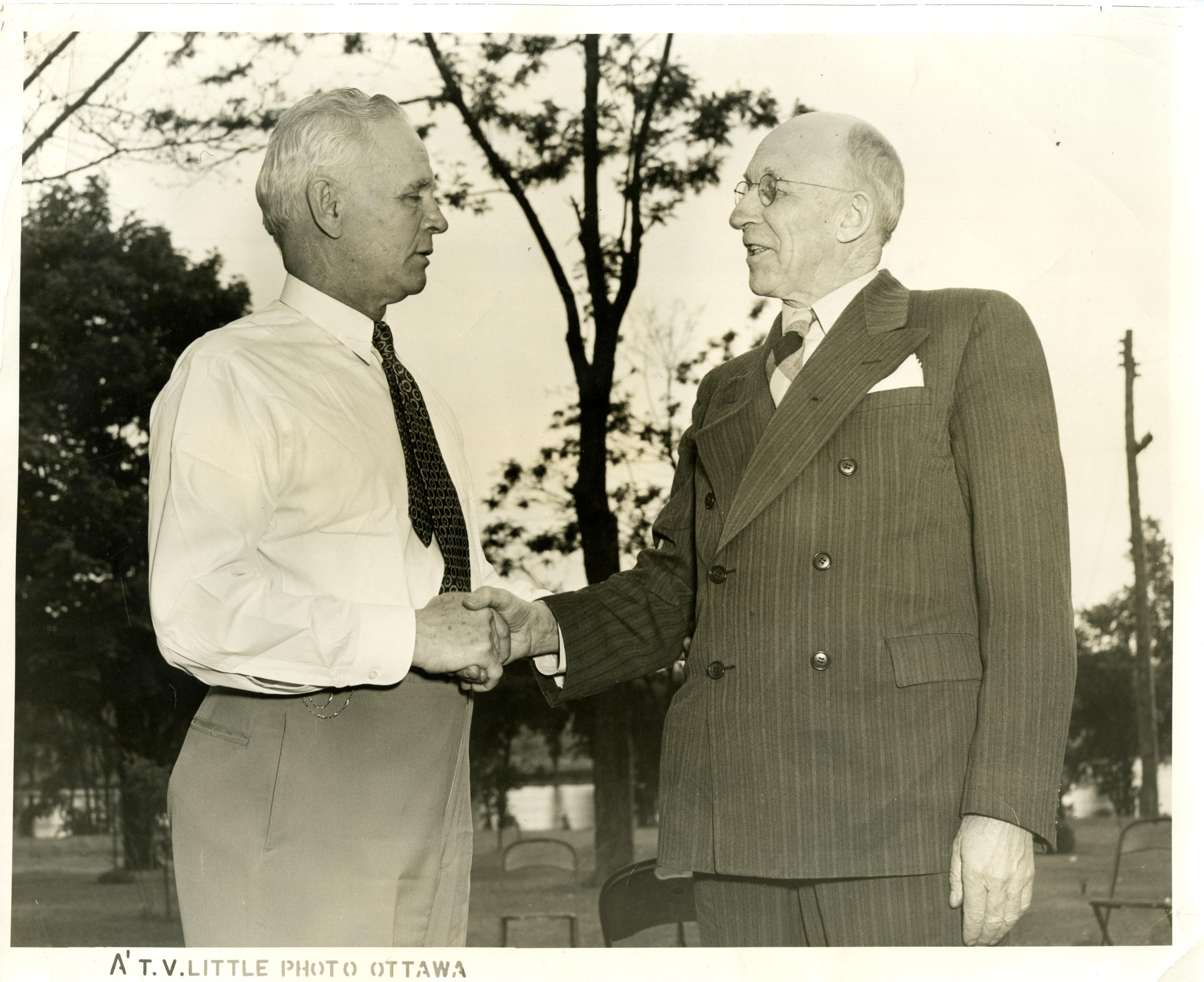
Bracken (left) shaking hands with George Henry Stokes in 1945.

Despite having co-operated with the Liberals at the provincial level, Bracken was asked by a number of senior federal Conservatives (including Arthur Meighen) to take over the leadership of the weak national Conservative Party in 1942. He agreed to seek the party's leadership on the condition that it change its name to the Progressive Conservative Party. He was elected leader at the party's 1942 leadership convention. Bracken stepped down as Manitoba premier shortly thereafter, and was succeeded by Stuart S. Garson.

Bracken did not seek a seat in the House of Commons until the 1945 Canadian election. While Bracken won the rural seat of Neepawa, the Tories were defeated nationally. The Tories picked up 29 seats, but were still well behind the governing Liberals; most of the seats that they did pick up were in Ontario, which was credited more to the popular provincial government of George A. Drew than Bracken's leadership of the national party. Bracken became Leader of the Opposition and remained leader of the Tories until he was pushed to resign in favour of Drew in 1948.

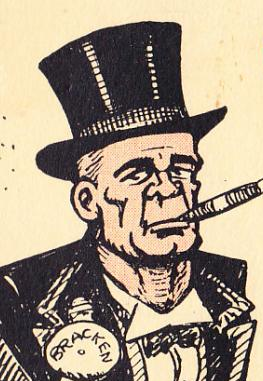
John Bracken in 1945 cartoon by Arch Dale

It has been argued, with some credibility, that Bracken never succeeded in impressing his personal authority over the national PC organization. As a western populist, he was distrusted by the party's eastern establishment. There are reports that some senior Tories wanted him removed as leader as early as 1944. More importantly, during the 1945 election, Bracken had promised conscription for the planned invasion of Japan. The Liberal Prime Minister, William Lyon Mackenzie King, by contrast had promised that one division of volunteers would take part in the invasion of Japan. Operation Downfall, the code-name for the invasion of Japan, was widely expected to be bloody campaign as the Battles of Iwo Jima and Okinawa were the "dress rehearsals" for the invasion of the Japanese home islands. Canadian public opinion was not keen on conscription for what was expected to be a campaign that would last several years.

Bracken's riding was merged into the seat of Brandon before the 1949 federal election. He was soundly defeated by Liberal incumbent James Matthews, and did not return to political life thereafter. Though his leadership of the Tories was generally viewed as a failure, he would gain some small degree of vindication in his later years as his western populist policies would be employed more successfully by John Diefenbaker, who succeeded Drew as leader in 1956, gaining the party a power base in the western provinces that would reliably support them from the late 1950s until their fall as a party of government in 1993.

Bracken died on March 18, 1969, and is buried in Rideauvale Cemetery at Kars, Ontario.

== Electoral record ==
Federal

1949 Canadian federal election: Brandon
Party	Candidate	Votes	%	±%
Liberal	James Ewen Matthews	11,263	55.27	
Progressive Conservative	John Bracken	7,150	35.09	
Independent	Dwight Lyman Johnson	1,964	9.64	
Total valid votes		20,377	100.00	
Total rejected ballots		142		
Turnout		20,519	74.64	
Electors on the lists		27,489		

1945 Canadian federal election: Neepawa
Party	Candidate	Votes	%
Progressive Conservative	John Bracken	6,497	46.51
Liberal	Frederick Donald MacKenzie	4,624	33.10
Co-operative Commonwealth	James Henry Wood	2,848	20.39
Total valid votes		13,969	
Total rejected ballots		93	
Turnout		14,062	82.64
Electors on the lists		17,015	

== Archives ==
There are John Bracken fonds at the Archives of Manitoba and Library and Archives Canada.

== Bibliography ==
- Ferguson, Barry; Wardhaugh, Robert Alexander (2010). Manitoba Premiers of 19th and 20th Centuries. University of Regina Press. ISBN 978-0-88977-216-8.
- Kendle, John Edward (1979). John Bracken: A Political Biography. University of Toronto Press. ISBN 978-0-8357-8195-4.

Political offices
Preceded by Robert Stirton Thornton	Manitoba Minister of Education; 1922–1923	Succeeded by Charles Cannon
Preceded by Tobias Norris	Premier of Manitoba; 1922–1943	Succeeded by Stuart Garson
Preceded by Tobias Norris	Manitoba President of the Council; 1922–1943	Succeeded by Stuart Garson
Preceded by	Manitoba Provincial Lands Commissioner; 1922–1923	Succeeded by Albert Prefontaine
Preceded by Tobias Norris	Manitoba Railway Commissioner; 1922–1923	Succeeded by Albert Prefontaine
Preceded by Neil Cameron	Manitoba Minister of Agriculture; 1923–1925	Succeeded by Albert Prefontaine
Preceded by Francis Black	Manitoba Provincial Treasurer; 1925–1932	Succeeded by Ewan McPherson
Preceded by	Manitoba Minister of Public Utilities; 1927–1928	Succeeded by William Clubb
Preceded by Duncan Lloyd McLeod	Manitoba Provincial Secretary; 1935–1939	Succeeded by John Stewart McDiarmid
Preceded by Duncan Lloyd McLeod	Manitoba Railway Commissioner; 1935–1940	Succeeded by John Stewart McDiarmid
Preceded by Donald Gordon McKenzie	Manitoba Minister of Agriculture; 1936	Succeeded by Douglas Lloyd Campbell
Preceded by Donald Gordon McKenzie	Manitoba Minister for the Manitoba Power Commission; 1936–1940	Succeeded by Stuart Garson
Preceded by	Manitoba Minister of Dominion–Provincial Relations; 1939–1940	Succeeded by William James Major
Preceded by William James Major	Manitoba Minister of Dominion–Provincial Relations; 1941–1943	Succeeded by Stuart Garson
Preceded by Gordon Graydon (acting)	Leader of the Official Opposition; 1945–1948	Vacant Title next held by George A. Drew
Party political offices
Preceded by Arthur Meighen	Leader of the Progressive; Conservative Party of Canada; 1942–1948	Succeeded by George A. Drew
