= 1941 Manitoba general election =

- April 22, 1941

55 seats of the Legislative Assembly of Manitoba 27 seats needed for a majority
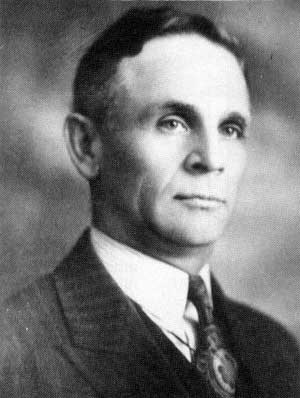

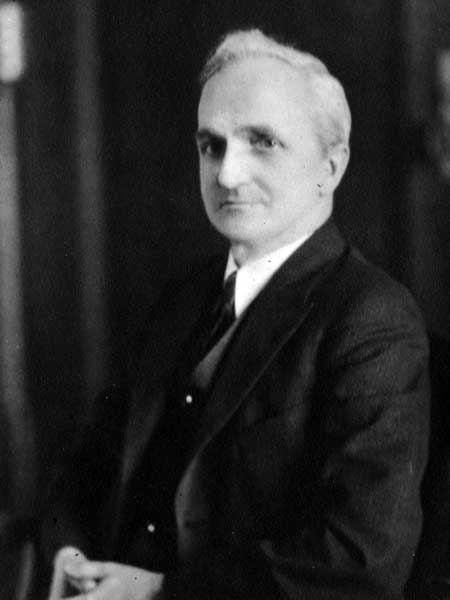
	First party	Second party	Third party
Leader	John Bracken	Errick Willis	Seymour Farmer
Party	Liberal–Progressive	Conservative	Co-operative Commonwealth
Leader since	August 8, 1922	June 9, 1936	1936
Leader's seat	The Pas	Deloraine	Winnipeg
Last election	23	16	7
Seats won	27	12	3
Seat change	▲4	▼4	▼4
Popular vote	58,337	25,940	28,301
Percentage	35.1%	19.9%	17.0%
Swing	▼0.2pp	▼7.9pp	▲5.0pp
Premier before election
John Bracken
Liberal–Progressive
Premier after election
John Bracken
Liberal–Progressive

The 1941 Manitoba general election was held on April 22, 1941 to elect Members of the Legislative Assembly of the Province of Manitoba, Canada.

This election was held shortly after the formation of a coalition government in December 1940. The coalition was created after the start of World War II, as a display of unity among the different parties in the legislature.

Premier John Bracken's Liberal-Progressives were the dominant force in government, while the Conservative Party under Errick Willis held a secondary position. The smaller Co-operative Commonwealth Federation and Social Credit League were also included in the government, and had cabinet representation.

The four coalition parties were the only legal political parties in Manitoba in 1941. The Communist Party had been declared illegal the previous year. Its only Member of the Legislative Assembly (MLA), James Litterick, had been expelled from the legislature and had gone into hiding.

When the coalition was created, Independent MLA Lewis Stubbs was the only legislator who did not join the government side. He claimed that a healthy opposition was necessary in a parliamentary democracy, and rejected offers to join the government. Later, Social Credit MLA Salome Halldorson and Conservatives Huntly Ketchen and John Poole also crossed to the opposition. And more were elected in the 1941 election.

The coalition's victory was a foregone conclusion: in most constituencies, there were no anti-coalition candidates. The opposition came mostly from anti-coalition dissidents in the governing parties. These candidates did not run a coordinated campaign, and did not seriously threaten the government.

The Social Credit League split before the election, and most of its candidates were opposed to the coalition. The party's most prominent MLAs, however, remained on the government side.

In some constituencies, the coalition parties ran candidates against one other. This had little effect on the overall result, though it did influence the relative strength of the coalition partners after the election. In most instances, the incumbent candidates were re-elected. The CCF agreed to limit its challenges against incumbent members, although this courtesy was not always reciprocated by other parties.

As expected, the coalition won a landslide victory. The government parties, along with pro-coalition independents, won 50 of the 55 seats in the legislature.

The election confirmed the Liberal-Progressives and Conservatives as the dominant parties in government. The Liberal-Progressives increased their representation from 23 MLAs to 27, only two short of an overall majority. The Conservatives were not as successful, falling from 16 seats to 12. The party remained influential in cabinet, however, and its leadership remained committed to the coalition.

For the CCF and Social Credit, the election was problematic. Many CCF members opposed the coalition, and due to the party's official support for the coalition the party had difficulty mobilizing its supporters to the voting booths. The CCF won only two seats in Winnipeg, and the Gimli constituency, for a total of three seats. John Queen, the CCF Mayor of Winnipeg, lost the legislative seat he had held since 1920.

After this result, the CCF's tenure in government was brief. Farmer left the coalition ministry in late 1942, and the party formally voted to leave the coalition at its 1943 convention. Many CCF officials later described their period in the coalition as a disaster for the party.

The result was also bad for Social Credit, which lost its internal cohesion during the campaign. All of the party's anti-coalition candidates were defeated, while three pro-government incumbents were re-elected. These MLAs effectively became an adjunct of the government, and did little in the way of promoting party policy. The Manitoba Social Credit League was marginalized in the 1940s, and did not become a functioning party again until 1953.

Five pro-coalition Independent MLAs were also elected.

Five anti-coalition MLAs were elected - three dissident Conservatives (one of whom later rejoined the government), Independent Lewis Stubbs, and Bill Kardash. Kardash, who ran as a "Worker's candidate", was widely known to be associated with the banned Communist Party. He did not proclaim this association openly, however, and was able to take his seat without a legal challenge. (He was re-elected under the label "Labor-Progressive Party" once being a Communist was no longer illegal.)

Three Sound Money Economics System candidates also ran in Winnipeg. All fared poorly, and the group disappeared soon after the election.

Like previous elections, all the voters cast preferential votes. Ten MLAs were elected in city-wide Winnipeg district through Single transferable vote; all other MLAs were elected through Instant-runoff voting.

== Results ==
Manitoba general election (April 22, 1941)
Party	Leader	First-preference votes		Seats			
Party	Leader	Votes	% FPv	Cand.	1936	Elected	Change
**Coalition candidates**							
█ Liberal–Progressive	John Bracken	58,337	35.7	42	23	27	4▲
█ Co-operative Commonwealth	Seymour Farmer	28,301	17.3	14	7	3	4▼
█ Conservative	Errick Willis	25,940	15.8	18	16	12	4▼
█ Independent		18,883	11.5	14	3	5	2▲
█ Social Credit		2,723	1.7	5	5	3	2▼
**Anti-Coalition candidates**							
█ Social Credit		9,156	5.6	6	–	–	–
█ Conservative		7,199	4.4	3	–	3	3▲
█ Independent		5,801	4.1	2	–	1	1▲
█ Communist		4,889	3.0	1	1	1	Steady
█ Sound Money Economics		864	0.5	3	–	–	–
█ Liberal		701	0.4	1	–	–	–
Valid		163,608	100.0	109	55	55	–
Rejected		2,780					
Total votes cast		166,388					
Registered voters/Turnout		405,459	50.5				

=== Results by riding ===
Bold names indicate members returned by acclamation. Italicized names indicate Anti-Coalition candidates returned. Incumbents are marked with *.

Arthur: **John R. Pitt***
Assiniboia: David Best
Beautiful Plains: **John Poole***
Birtle: Francis Bell*
Brandon: George Dinsdale*
Carillon: Edmond Prefontaine*
Cypress: James Christie*
Dauphin: **Robert Hawkins***
Deloraine: **Errick Willis***
Dufferin: **John Munn***
Emerson: John Solomon
Ethelbert: Nicholas Hryhorczuk
Fairford: Stuart Garson*
Fisher: Nicholas Bachynsky*
Gilbert Plains: Stanley Fox*
Gimli: Joseph Wawrykow
Gladstone: **William Morton***
Glenwood: **James Breakey***

Hamiota: Norman Turnbull*
Iberville: Arthur Boivin
Kildonan & St. Andrews: James McLenaghen*
Killarney: John Laughlin*
Lakeside: **Douglas Campbell***
Lansdowne: **Matthew Sutherland***
La Verendrye: Sauveur Marcoux*
Manitou: **Hugh Morrison***
Minnedosa: Earl Rutledge*
Morden & Rhineland: Wallace C. Miller*
Morris: John C. Dryden
Mountain: **Ivan Schultz***
Norfolk: John Lawrie*
Portage la Prairie: **Toby Sexsmith***
Roblin: **Sidney Rogers***
Rockwood: Mungo Lewis*
Rupertsland: Daniel Hamilton
Russell: William Wilson

St. Boniface: Austin Clarke
St. Clements: Nicholas Stryk
St. George: Skuli Sigfusson
Ste. Rose: Maurice Dane MacCarthy*
Springfield: Evelyn Shannon*
Swan River: George Renouf*
The Pas: **John Bracken***
Turtle Mountain: **Alexander Welch***
Virden: **Robert Mooney***
Winnipeg: Paul Bardal
Winnipeg: John Stewart McDiarmid*
Winnipeg: Charles Rhodes Smith
Winnipeg: Seymour Farmer*
Winnipeg: Morris Gray
Winnipeg: Huntly Ketchen*
Winnipeg: Gunnar Thorvaldson
Winnipeg: Stephen Krawchyk
Winnipeg: Lewis Stubbs*
Winnipeg: Bill Kardash

=== Winnipeg ===
Winnipeg:

Ten MLAs were elected through Single transferable vote.

Winnipeg MLAs returned by party
Party	Coalition	Anti-Coalition
Liberal–Progressive	3	
Co-operative Commonwealth	2	
Conservative	1	1
Independent	1	1
Communist		1
**Total**	7	3

Winnipeg (ten members)
Party	Candidate	FPv%	Count																				
Party	Candidate	FPv%	1	2	3	4	5	6	7	8	9	10	11	12	13	14	15	16	17	18	19	20	21
Liberal–Progressive	**John Stewart McDiarmid***	11.87	**6,963**																				
Independent	**Lewis Stubbs***	9.89	5,801	**5,801**																			
Liberal–Progressive	**Charles Rhodes Smith**	8.44	4,955	5,485	**5,485**																		
Communist	**Bill Kardash**	8.33	4,889	4,895	4,931	4,931	4,931	4,931	4,939	4,953	4,973	4,977	4,979	5,036	5,050	5,060	5,099	5,108	5,162	5,171	5,242	5,281	**5,351**
Independent	**Stephen Krawchyk**	7.96	4,673	4,697	4,713	4,714	4,716	4,717	4,720	4,788	4,804	4,811	4,831	4,858	4,877	4,885	4,900	4,932	4,940	4,970	5,031	5,207	**5,315**
Conservative	**Huntly Ketchen***	7.03	4,123	4,209	4,270	4,273	4,279	4,322	4,335	4,335	4,402	4,419	4,468	4,563	4,721	5,176	**5,217**						
Conservative	**Gunnar Thorvaldson**	5.49	3,220	3,363	3,381	3,396	3,408	3,418	3,424	3,432	3,456	3,475	3,698	3,740	3,787	3,862	3,872	4,024	4,098	4,723	4,825	5,796	**5,796**
Co-operative Commonwealth	**Morris Gray**	5.26	3,086	3,093	3,107	3,108	3,113	3,117	3,127	3,132	3,141	3,156	3,161	3,171	3,179	3,185	3,235	3,242	4,364	4,391	4,552	4,674	**5,140**
Conservative	James A. Barry*	4.25	2,492	2,569	2,586	2,592	2,594	2,609	2,611	2,664	2,678	2,696	2,767	2,778	2,946	3,012	3,033	3,101	3,188	3,552	3,612		
Co-operative Commonwealth	**Seymour Farmer***	3.83	2,249	2,294	2,349	2,353	2,356	2,376	2,433	2,466	2,482	2,623	2,635	2,664	2,687	2,703	3,031	3,115	3,159	3,263	4,461	4,718	**6,494**
Co-operative Commonwealth	John Queen*	3.70	2,170	2,248	2,302	2,304	2,315	2,326	2,345	2,361	2,388	2,470	2,487	2,542	2,579	2,595	2,732	2,793	2,980	3,103	3,631	3,892	
Liberal–Progressive	**Paul Bardal**	3.62	2,127	2,408	2,435	2,510	2,525	2,537	2,547	2,559	2,582	2,627	2,664	2,728	2,897	2,932	2,952	3,390	3,462	4,007	4,174	4,867	**5,324**
Co-operative Commonwealth	Stanley Knowles	3.15	1,849	1,867	1,900	1,900	1,903	1,907	1,915	1,920	1,946	2,000	2,021	2,051	2,078	2,089	2,442	2,525	2,545	2,611			
Independent	W.V. Tobias	3.09	1,815	1,829	1,843	1,845	1,848	1,853	1,855	1,857	1,859	1,873	1,881	1,887	1,897	1,904	1,907	1,927					
Conservative	F.E. Warriner	2.91	1,706	1,808	1,825	1,838	1,844	1,846	1,853	1,861	1,882	1,906	1,982	1,991	2,026	2,069	2,082	2,227	2,268				
Liberal–Progressive	H. Dick	1.80	1,059	1,164	1,174	1,189	1,194	1,198	1,202	1,212	1,220	1,230	1,266	1,285	1,337	1,362	1,369						
Co-operative Commonwealth	William Ivens	1.64	962	966	986	986	987	993	1,003	1,013	1,021	1,068	1,072	1,106	1,113	1,120							
Conservative	Harrison Dysart	1.33	780	802	814	815	817	836	836	844	857	859	884	904	931								
Liberal	Laurier Regnier	1.19	701	742	753	762	766	768	770	785	793	801	823	853									
Conservative	James Cowan	1.07	627	641	646	647	648	654	655	656	662	665											
Social Credit	Asta Oddson	0.98	575	580	587	587	594	594	691	695	716	719	721										
Liberal–Progressive	James Simpkin	0.87	510	522	538	538	539	545	552	559	563												
Sound Money Economics	T.H. Elliott	0.62	361	366	373	374	414	416	422	484													
Sound Money Economics	Madeline Hrynlewlecki	0.54	316	318	321	321	348	349	353														
Social Credit	J. J. Evans	0.50	294	297	303	303	304	311															
Independent	J.K. Downes	0.50	192	193	198	198	198																
Sound Money Economics	Thomas McConochie	0.32	187	191	193	193																	
Exhausted ballots		—	—	–	–	–	36	54	89	101	252	305	337	520	572	723	806	958	1,176	1,545	1,814	2,907	3,922
Electorate: 137,437 Valid: 58,682 Spoilt: 1,033 Quota: 5,335 Turnout: 59,715 (43.45%)

* - Incumbent
(Italics indicate Anti-Coalition candidate; bold indicates candidate was declared elected)

Winnipeg (analysis of transferred votes, ranked in order of 1st preference votes)
Party	Candidate	Maximum round	Maximum votes	Share in maximum round	Maximum votes First round votes Transfer votes
Liberal-Progressive	**John Stewart McDiarmid**	1	6,963	11.87%	
Independent	**Lewis Stubbs**	1	5,801	9.89%	
Liberal-Progressive	**Charles Rhodes Smith**	3	5,485	9.35%	
Communist	**Bill Kardash**	21	5,351	9.77%	
Independent	**Stephen Krawchyk**	21	5,315	9.71%	
Conservative	**Huntly Ketchen**	15	5,217	9.01%	
Conservative	**Gunnar Thorvaldson**	21	5,796	10.58%	
CCF	**Morris Gray**	21	5,140	9.39%	
Conservative	James A. Barry	19	3,612	6.35%	
CCF	**Seymour Farmer**	21	6,494	11.86%	
CCF	John Queen	20	3,892	6.98%	
Liberal-Progressive	**Paul Bardal**	21	5,324	9.72%	
CCF	Stanley Knowles	18	2,611	4.57%	
Independent	W.V. Tobias	16	1,927	3.34%	
Conservative	F.E. Warriner	17	2,268	3.94%	
Liberal-Progressive	H. Dick	15	1,369	2.37%	
CCF	William Ivens	14	1,120	1.93%	
Conservative	Harrison Dysart	13	931	1.60%	
Liberal	Laurier Regnier	12	853	1.47%	
Conservative	James Cowan	11	665	1.14%	
Social Credit	Asta Oddson	11	721	1.24%	
Liberal-Progressive	James Simpkin	9	563	0.96%	
Sound Money Economics	T.H. Elliott	8	484	0.83%	
Sound Money Economics	Madeline Hrynlewlecki	7	353	0.60%	
Social Credit	J. J. Evans	6	311	0.53%	
Independent	J.K. Downes	5	198	0.34%	
Sound Money Economics	Thomas McConochie	4	193	0.33%	
Exhausted votes			3,922	6.73%	

== Sources ==
The first ballot results for Winnipeg and results for all other constituencies are taken from an official Manitoba government publication entitled "Manitoba elections, 1920-1941", cross-referenced with the 1942 Canadian Parliamentary Guide and the "Historical Statement of Votes" section of the 2003 provincial election report. Unfortunately, the second-ballot results are not listed in these sources.

All ballot results for Winnipeg after the first count are taken from reports in the Winnipeg Free Press newspaper. It is possible that some errors appeared in the original publication.

== Post-election changes ==
John Poole appears to have returned to the coalition shortly after the election. The CCF left the governing coalition in 1943.

Dufferin (dec. John Munn, 1941), June 22, 1943:

- Earl Collins (C) accl.

Killarney (dec. John Laughlin, 1941), June 22, 1943:

- Abram Harrison (C) 1378
- Chapman 987

The Pas (res. John Bracken, January 15, 1943), August 17, 1943:

- Beresford Richards (CCF) 3504
- McIsaac 1270
- Wright 526
- Mainwaring 480

Brandon (dec. George Dinsdale, 1943), November 18, 1943:

- Dwight Johnson (CCF) 3722
- Young 3204

Portage la Prairie (dec. Toby Sexsmith, 1943), November 18, 1943:

- Charles Greenlay (C) 1762
- Ireland 621
- Miller 436

Winnipeg (dec. Stephen Krawchyk, 1943)

St. Boniface (dec. Austin Clarke, 1945)

Morden-Rhineland (res. Wallace C. Miller, 1945

Dwight Johnson and Beresford Richards were expelled from the CCF caucus in 1945.

== See also ==
- List of Manitoba political parties
