= Dwight Johnson =

Dwight Johnson may refer to:

- Dwight Johnson (politician) (1898–1972), politician in Manitoba, Canada
- Dwight H. Johnson (1947–1971), United States Army soldier and Medal of Honor recipient
- Dwight Johnson (American football) (born 1970), American football player
