= McDorman =

McDorman is a surname. Notable people with the surname include:

- Jake McDorman (born 1986), American actor
- Leslie McDorman (died 1966), Canadian politician
- Joshua McDorman (born 1986) American Investor

== See also ==
- McGorman
