= Charles Rhodes Smith =

Canadian politician (1896–1993)

Charles Rhodes Smith (March 20, 1896 – September 30, 1993) was a politician in Manitoba, Canada. He served in the Legislative Assembly of Manitoba from 1941 to 1952 as a Liberal-Progressive, and was a cabinet minister in the governments of Stuart Garson and Douglas Campbell.

== Education and early career ==
Born in Portage la Prairie, Manitoba, the son of Richard Henry Smith and Marion Sarah Marshall, Smith was educated at the University of Manitoba and Oxford University, receiving M.A., LL.B. and B.C.L. degrees. He worked as a barrister, and was also a lecturer at the Manitoba Law School. From 1935 to 1941, he served as an alderman in the City of Winnipeg. Smith was also a member of the O.C. 104th Company, and received the rank of Major in 1941. In 1924, he married Luella Gertrude Lick.

In the 1941 provincial election, Smith was a star candidate for the Liberal-Progressives in the Winnipeg constituency. During this period, Winnipeg elected ten members via a single transferable ballot. Smith finished third on the first count with 4,955 votes, and was declared elected on the second count following transfers from fellow Liberal-Progressive J.S. McDiarmid. He served as a government backbencher in the parliament which followed.

== Political success ==
Smith was re-elected in the 1945 provincial election. He fell to fifth place on the first count, but was elected on the eleventh count following transfers from Paul Bardal, another Liberal-Progressive. On February 15, 1946, he was appointed Minister of Labour in the government of Stuart Garson. When Douglas Campbell became Premier on December 14, 1948, promoted Smith to Minister of Education.

Winnipeg's electoral map was redrawn before the 1949 provincial election, with the single ten-member constituency replaced by three four-member constituencies. Smith ran for re-election in Winnipeg Centre, and was elected on the first count following a first-place finish. On August 16, 1950, he was promoted again to Attorney General of Manitoba.

Despite the party's name, the Liberal-Progressives were further to the right than the other major political parties in Manitoba. CCF leader Lloyd Stinson once described Smith as "the only genuine liberal in the Campbell cabinet". There are rumours that Smith came within one vote of defeating Campbell to become leader of the Liberal-Progressive Party, at a private caucus vote held in late 1948.

He was considered to be a gentlemanly and dignified figure, and as one of the most intelligent members of the house.

== Later career ==
He resigned from the legislature in 1952 to become chair of the Federal Restrictive Trade Practices Commission. A year later, he was named chair of the Canada Labor Relations Board. In 1963, he was appointed Judge of the Court of Queen's Bench of Manitoba. Named to the Manitoba Court of Appeal in 1966, he became its chief justice the following year.

In 1971, he began working on a comprehensive inquiry for the provincial government of Edward Schreyer, examining the legal and financial development of the Churchill Forest Industries in The Pas. Later in the decade, he chaired a separate inquiry into flooding policies and aboriginal rights in northern Manitoba.

He died in Winnipeg at the age of 97.

Smith was the father-in-law of Muriel Smith, who was a provincial cabinet minister in the government of Howard Pawley.
