= Holy Trinity Church, Leven =

Church in Leven, East Riding of Yorkshire, England

Coordinates: 53.8915°N 0.3177°W

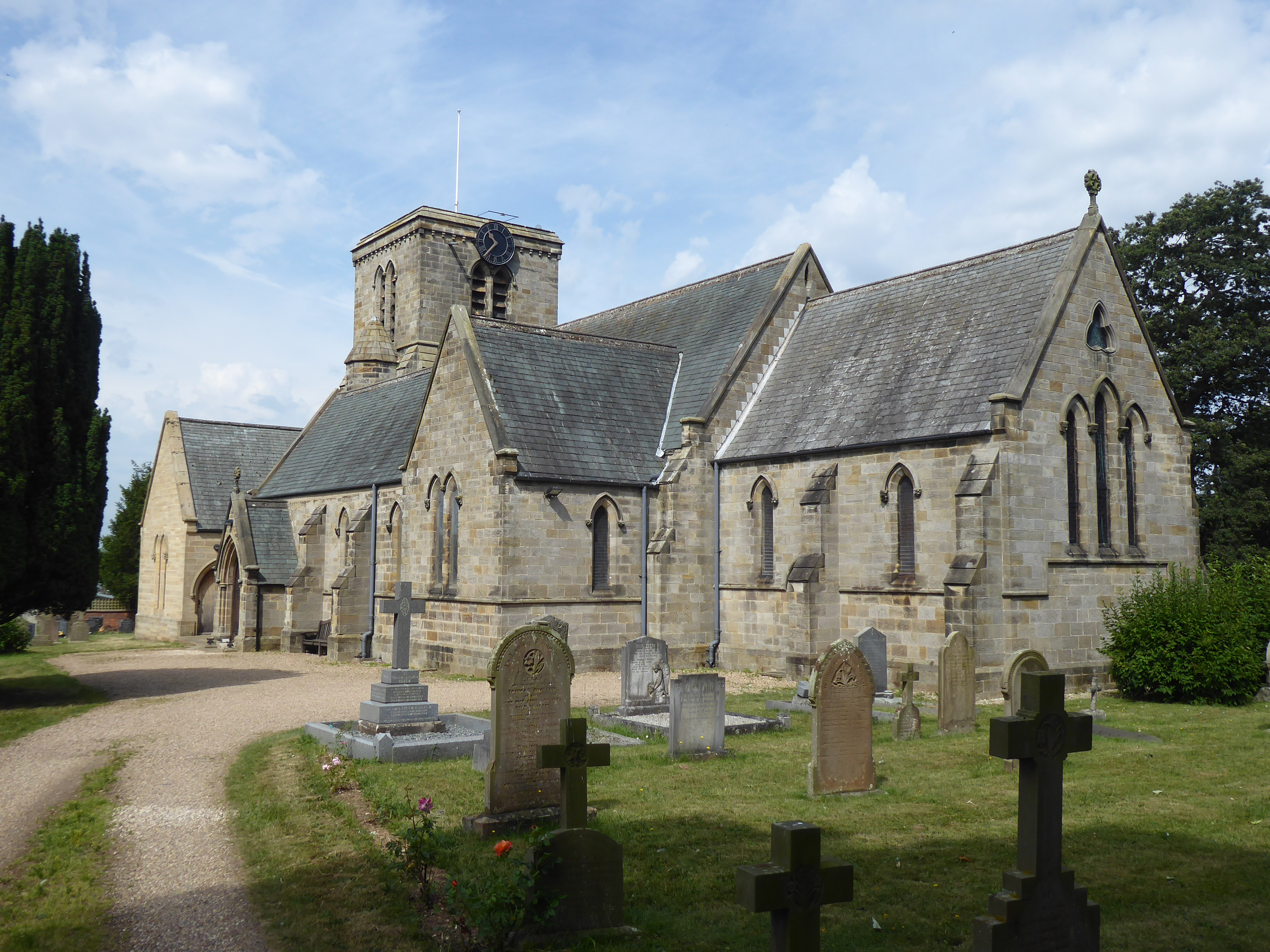
The church, in 2022

Holy Trinity Church is the parish church of Leven, East Riding of Yorkshire, a village in England.

There was a church in Leven at the time of the Domesday Book. By the 16th century, it was dedicated to Saint Zita, or alternatively to Saint Faith. Most of the church was demolished in 1844, though the chancel was retained as a burial chapel until 1883. A new church was constructed between 1843 and 1844, on a different site, in the centre of the village. It was designed by Robert Dennis Chantrell in a 13th-century Gothic revival style. A parish room was added between 1998 and 1999, to a design by Ferrey and Menim. The building was grade II* listed in 1968.

View from the nave into the chancel

The church is built of gritstone and limestone with slate roofs. It consists of a nave, a south aisle, a south porch, north and south transepts, a chancel and a west tower. The tower has three stages, an octagonal stair turret to the south, a plinth, buttresses, paired lancet bell openings with a hood mould, a corbel table, and a low coped parapet. The windows in the body of the church are lancets. Inside, the mediaeval nave arcade, chancel arch and a piscina survive, moved from the old church, and there is a 13th-century font. There is part of an Anglo-Saxon cross shaft in the nave.

== See also ==
- Grade II* listed buildings in the East Riding of Yorkshire
- Listed buildings in Leven, East Riding of Yorkshire
