= George Dinsdale =

Canadian politician

George Dinsdale (August 14, 1887 in Leven, East Riding of Yorkshire, England – September 21, 1943) was a politician in Manitoba, Canada. He served as a Conservative representative in the Legislative Assembly of Manitoba from 1932 until his death.

The son of George Dinsdale and Harriet Catherick, Dinsdale was educated at Rise, a village about three miles south-east of Leven, and came to Canada in 1904. He first farmed in Ontario and came west in 1906, settling on a Dominion Lands Act homestead at Craik, Saskatchewan. Dinsdale moved to Brandon, Manitoba later that year. He served six years as an alderman in Brandon, Manitoba, and was the city's mayor in 1920 and 1921. Dinsdale was also the owner of Dinsdale Cartage, and was a member of the Salvation Army. In 1909, he married Minnie Lang.

In Brandon's 1919 mayoralty campaign, Dinsdale presented himself as a "labour man", though noting he had opposed the recent general strike in the city. Albert E. Smith, a prominent labour organizer and later a Member of the Legislative Assembly, contended that Dinsdale was actually a candidate of the city's conservative interests. With support from pro-development groups, he defeated incumbent mayor Harry Cater.

As mayor, Dinsdale presided over sharp tax increases and a burgeoning bank overdraft. He was re-elected as mayor in 1920, but lost to Harry Cater in 1921. Cater again defeated Dinsdale in 1922, despite Dinsdale's popularity among the city's ethnic communities.

Dinsdale was first elected to the Manitoba legislature in the 1932 provincial election, defeating three other opponents in the constituency of Brandon. In the 1936 election, he was re-elected over Liberal-Progressive candidate H.O. McDiarmid by 770 votes. The Conservatives were Manitoba's primary opposition party in this period, and Dinsdale sat with his party on the opposition benches.

In 1940, the Conservatives entered into a coalition government which included the governing Liberal-Progressives and two smaller parties. Dinsdale was re-elected in the 1941 election as a pro-coalition Conservative, defeating McDiarmid a second time by a reduced margin.

Dinsdale died at home in 1943. His son, Walter Dinsdale, was later a federal cabinet minister in the government of John Diefenbaker. Both father and son used the campaign slogan, "Has Served, is Serving and Will Serve".

Annie Fairhurst published a work entitled From Pig-Pen to Parliament: George Dinsdale, O.F. in 1949.
