= James Cowan (Manitoba politician) =

Canadian politician (1914–1997)

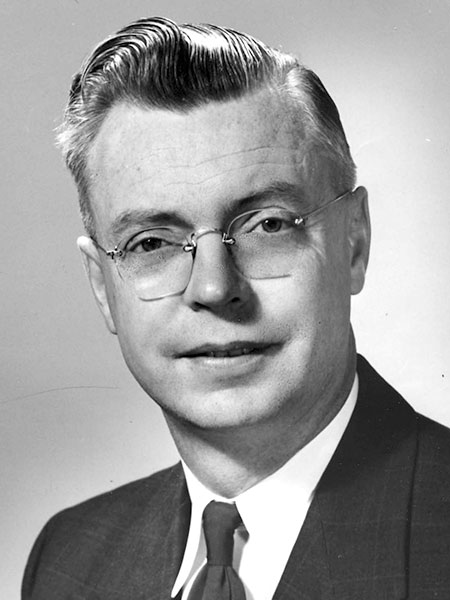
- Cowan, c. 1958

Member of the Legislative Assembly of Manitoba from Winnipeg Centre
- In office 1958–1969
- Preceded by: Stephen Juba
- Succeeded by: Bud Boyce

Member of the Winnipeg City Council
- In office 1955–1958

Personal details
- Born: September 5, 1914; Portage la Prairie, Manitoba, Canada
- Died: January 4, 1997 (aged 82); Winnipeg, Manitoba, Canada
- Political party: Progressive Conservative
- Education: Manitoba Law School (LLB)

Military service
- Branch/service: Canadian Army
- Battles/wars: World War II

James Cowan (September 5, 1914 – January 4, 1997) was a Canadian lawyer and politician who served as a Progressive Conservative member of the Legislative Assembly of Manitoba from 1958 to 1969.

== Early life and education ==
Cowan was born in Portage la Prairie, Manitoba, the son of Thomas Hind Cowan and Robena Isabel Taylor. He was educated at the Manitoba Law School in Winnipeg and was called to the Manitoba bar in 1939.

== Career ==
Cowan worked as a lawyer in Winnipeg until 1984. He served in the Canadian Army during World War II and was later president of the Canadian Legion Memorial Housing Foundation within Manitoba. During this period, he was known as a vigorous proponent of housing for retired veterans.

He first ran for public office in the 1941 provincial election, as a candidate of the Conservative Party of Manitoba in the electoral district of Winnipeg. Winnipeg, at the time, elected ten members by preferential balloting in an at-large poll. Cowan finished last among the Conservative candidates, and was eliminated on the tenth count with only 665 votes.

He ran for the House of Commons of Canada as a Progressive Conservative in the 1953 federal election, but lost to Liberal incumbent William Weir in the riding of Portage—Neepawa. He later moved to Winnipeg, and served as a member of the Winnipeg City Council from 1955 to 1958.

Cowan was first elected to the Manitoba legislature in the 1958 provincial election, winning an easy victory in the riding of Winnipeg Centre. He was returned in the elections of 1959, 1962 and 1966, never encountering any serious challenges. He was never appointed to cabinet, but served as deputy speaker for a time.

The New Democratic Party defeated the Progressive Conservatives in the 1969 provincial election, and NDP candidate Bud Boyce defeated Cowan by almost 1,000 votes in the Winnipeg Centre riding.

== Personal life ==
Cowan was married twice, first to Dorothy Jones in 1945 and then, after they divorced, to Rose Amy Cooper in 1956. Cowan died in Winnipeg and was buried in Portage la Prairie.
