= Philip S. Lee =

Canadian politician

The Honourable Philip S. Lee CM OM
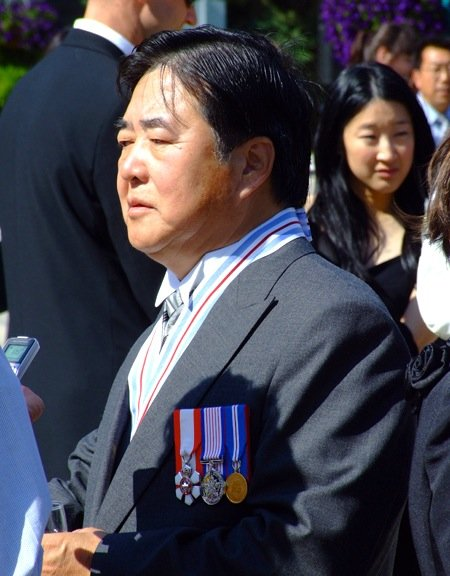

24th Lieutenant Governor of Manitoba
- In office August 4, 2009 – June 19, 2015
- Monarch: Elizabeth II
- Governors General: Michaëlle Jean; David Johnston
- Premier: Gary Doer; Greg Selinger
- Preceded by: John Harvard
- Succeeded by: Janice Filmon

Personal details
- Born: May 5, 1944 (age 81) Japanese-occupied Hong Kong
- Profession: Chemist, politician

Philip Siu Lun Lee CM OM (born May 5, 1944; Chinese: 李紹麟) was the 24th lieutenant governor of Manitoba. He was made a Member of the Order of Canada in 1999 and received the Queen's Golden Jubilee Medal in 2002.

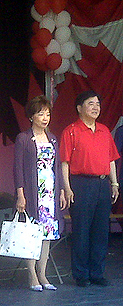
Philip S. Lee and Anita K. Lee at the 2010 Canada Day celebrations in Winnipeg

Born and raised in Hong Kong, Lee migrated to Canada in 1962 to study at the University of Manitoba. He graduated with a Bachelor of Science degree in 1966, and a public administration diploma in 1977. In 1967 he was hired by the City of Winnipeg as a research chemist. He helped organize the Chinese pavilion in the first Folklorama in 1970 and later became Vice President of the Folk Arts Council of Winnipeg. In the 1977 Manitoba general election, Lee ran as a Progressive Conservative candidate in Winnipeg Centre where he lost to Bud Boyce of the Manitoba New Democratic Party. Lee was on Winnipeg's Refugee Assistance Committee from 1979 to 1986. He also advocated for the construction of the Winnipeg Chinese Cultural and Community Centre in the Dynasty Building, the Chinese Gate and Garden, and the Mandarin Building in Winnipeg.

His appointment as Lieutenant Governor was made by Governor General of Canada Michaëlle Jean, on the Constitutional advice of Prime Minister of Canada Stephen Harper, on June 19, 2009. Upon assuming the office on August 4, 2009, Lee became the 24th lieutenant governor of the province. Lee left office on June 19, 2015, after a six-year term.

Lee was the third Chinese Canadian to be a provincial vice-regal, after David Lam of British Columbia and Norman Kwong of Alberta.

== Arms ==
Coat of arms of Philip S. Lee
Adopted August 20, 2010 Crest Issuant from a circlet of prairie crocus flowers Or a plum tree Proper fructed Purpure. Escutcheon Chequy of nine Purpure and Argent on a chief Or three bauhinia flowers Purpure. Supporters Dexter a sea-bison sinister a sea-qilin both Or queued Purpure. Compartment Issuant from barry wavy Or and Purpure. Motto Advance The People Orders The ribbon and insignia of a Companion of the Order of Canada. DESIDERANTES MELIOREM PATRIAM (They desire a better country) Symbolism The nine-division pattern represents His Honour’s position as the ninth child of his parents. The bauhinia flower represents Hong Kong, the birthplace of His Honour and his wife, Anita. Three such flowers represent their three children. The plum colour is His Honour’s favourite colour. The prairie crocus flowers, the provincial flower coloured gold here, represent His Honour’s interest in the betterment of all Manitobans. The plum tree alludes to the name “Lee”, which means “plum tree” in Chinese. The bison is taken from the arms of Manitoba. The qilin is significant to His Honour’s family and Chinese heritage, representing benevolence, goodwill, and good government. The lower body of a fish-tail alludes to his skills in water research and limnology studies. Refers to the fact that His Honour has always been a community-minded supporter of encouraging the development and growth of all Manitobans.

Order of precedence
Preceded by Yvon Dumont as the 21st Lieutenant Governor of Manitoba	Order of precedence in Manitoba as the 24th Lieutenant Governor of Manitoba	Succeeded by Janice Filmon as the 25th Lieutenant Governor of Manitoba
