= Austin Clarke (politician) =

Canadian politician (1896–1945)

Austin Lloyd Clarke (February 18, 1896 — January 29, 1945) was a politician in Manitoba, Canada. He served in the Legislative Assembly of Manitoba as a Liberal-Progressive representative from 1941 to 1945.

== Early life and education ==
Clarke was born in Cornwall, Ontario, the son of Kenneth and Georgiana Clarke, a family that traced its background to the United Empire Loyalist migration. He was educated in Cornwall, and later moved to Manitoba. In 1921, Clarke married Flossie Gladys Warner.

== Career ==
Clarke worked as a sales manager, and was president of A. Lloyd Clarke & Co. Ltd. and the Manitoba Motor League. He served on the municipal council for St. Vital and was reeve from 1938 to 1941, and was also active in freemasonry.

== Political life ==
He was elected to the Manitoba legislature in the 1941 provincial election, defeating Cooperative Commonwealth Federation candidate Edwin Hansford in the constituency of St. Boniface. In parliament, Clarke was a backbench supporter of the governments of John Bracken and Stuart Garson.

He died in office in 1945.
