= Winnipeg Centre (provincial electoral district) =

Defunct provincial electoral district in Manitoba, Canada

Winnipeg Centre was a provincial electoral district in Manitoba, Canada. It existed in three separate periods, using different boundaries and different election systems: 1888–1914 single-member district using first past the post; 1914–1920 two seats but each elected separately using first past the post; 1949 to 1958 (when it covered a third of Winnipeg) four-member district using STV; 1958 to 1981 single-member district using First Past The Post. In 1981, it was eliminated through redistribution.

It was initially created for the 1888 provincial election, and was abolished before the 1920 election when Winnipeg was made into a single ten-member constituency. It was re-established for the elections of 1949 and 1953, as a four-member constituency. The constituency was re-drawn in 1958, when Winnipeg and its suburbs were divided into twenty single-member constituencies, one of which was called Winnipeg Centre. This single-member constituency lasted until 1981, when it was eliminated through redistribution.

During the time it was a multi-member city-wide district no by-elections were held there. Seats were left empty until the next general election.

== Members of the Legislative Assembly ==
=== Original constituency (1888–1920) ===
Winnipeg Centre was created for the 1888 election, when the city of Winnipeg was granted a third seat. Winnipeg had previously been represented in the legislature by MLAs elected in Winnipeg North and Winnipeg South.

Winnipeg Centre, a single-member constituency, was given a second member prior to the 1914 election. Electors were allowed to cast two ballots, one for each of the two seats, which were called "Winnipeg Centre A" and "Winnipeg Centre B".

The constituency returned four representatives in 1914 and 1915, all of whom were prominent figures.

Daniel Hunter McMillan was a cabinet minister in Thomas Greenway's government, and later served as the Lieutenant Governor of Manitoba from 1911 to 1916.

Thomas Taylor, his successor, had served as Mayor of Winnipeg in the 1890s.

Thomas Herman Johnson was a prominent minister under Tobias Norris.

Fred Dixon was elected in Winnipeg Centre in 1914. He was notable as the first Labour representative in the legislature. In the elections of 1914 and 1915, he was co-endorsed by the Liberal Party and the Labour Representation Committee. He was the most prominent strike leader of the Winnipeg General Strike — his successful defence on the charge of seditious libel was cause for celebration among Winnipeg workers. In 1920, running in the new city-wide district, he won election as a Labour Party candidate and was re-elected in 1922.

==== Winnipeg Centre ====
| Name | Party | Took office | Left office |
| Daniel Hunter McMillan | Liberal | 1888 | 1900 |
| Thomas Taylor | Conservative | 1900 | 1914 |

==== Winnipeg Centre A ====
| Name | Party | Took office | Left office |
| Thomas Herman Johnson | Liberal | 1914 | 1922 (1920 district abolished) |

==== Winnipeg Centre B ====
| Name | Party | Took office | Left office |
| Fred Dixon | Independent | 1914 | 1928 (1920 district abolished) |

=== Four-member constituency ===
The single Winnipeg constituency into three multiple-member districts for the 1949 election: Winnipeg North, Winnipeg Centre and Winnipeg South. All three constituencies elected four members to the legislature, with electors choosing representatives by a single transferable ballot.

The electorate of Winnipeg Centre included supporters of the socialist Cooperative Commonwealth Federation, the Liberal-Progressive and the Progressive Conservative Party. Independent candidate Stephen Juba also won election to the legislature in 1953.

==== Winnipeg Centre (1949–1958) ====
| Name | Party | Took office | Left office |
| Charles Rhodes Smith | Liberal–Progressive | 1949 | 1952 |
| Paul Bardal | Liberal–Progressive | 1949 | 1953 |
| Jack St. John | Liberal–Progressive | 1953 | 1958 |
| Donovan Swailes | CCF | 1949 | 1958 |
| Gordon Fines | CCF | 1949 | 1953 |
| Hank Scott | PC | 1953 | 1958 |
| Stephen Juba | Independent | 1953 | 1958 |

=== Single-member constituency ===
The single-member electoral division of Winnipeg Centre was created with the 1958 election, after the four-member division of the same name was eliminated.

The constituency was represented by Progressive Conservative James Cowan from 1958 to 1969, and was considered safe for the PC Party. Joseph "Bud" Boyce of the New Democratic Party won it in 1969, and held it until its abolition in 1981. Boyce left the NDP to join the newly formed Progressive Party prior to the 1981 election.

==== Winnipeg Centre (1958–1981) ====
| Name | Party | Took office | Left office |
| James Cowan | PC | 1958 | 1969 |
| Bud Boyce | NDP | 1969 | 1981 |
| Progressive | Bud Boyce | 1981 | 1981 |

== Election results ==
=== 1888 ===
1888 Manitoba general election
| Party | Candidate | Votes | % |
|---|---|---|---|
| Liberal | Daniel Hunter McMillan | 972 | 67.41 |
| Conservative | Thomas Gilroy | 470 | 32.59 |
| Total valid votes | | 1,442 | – |
| Rejected | | N/A | – |
| Eligible voters / Turnout | | N/A | – |
Source(s) Source: Manitoba. Chief Electoral Officer (1999). Statement of Votes for the 37th Provincial General Election, September 21, 1999 (PDF) (Report). Winnipeg: Elections Manitoba.

=== 1889 by-election ===
Manitoba provincial by-election, 1889
| Party | Candidate | Votes | % | ±% |
|---|---|---|---|---|
| Liberal | Daniel Hunter McMillan | Acclaimed | – | – |
| Total valid votes | | | – | – |
| Rejected | | N/A | – | |
| Eligible voters / Turnout | | N/A | – | – |
Source(s) Source: Manitoba. Chief Electoral Officer (1999). Statement of Votes for the 37th Provincial General Election, September 21, 1999 (PDF) (Report). Winnipeg: Elections Manitoba.

=== 1892 ===
1892 Manitoba general election
| Party | Candidate | Votes | % | ±% |
|---|---|---|---|---|
| Liberal | Daniel Hunter McMillan | 1,177 | 68.83 | – |
| Conservative | John Julius Winram | 533 | 31.17 | – |
| Total valid votes | | 1,710 | – | – |
| Rejected | | N/A | – | |
| Eligible voters / Turnout | | 2,627 | 65.09 | – |
Source(s) Source: Manitoba. Chief Electoral Officer (1999). Statement of Votes for the 37th Provincial General Election, September 21, 1999 (PDF) (Report). Winnipeg: Elections Manitoba.

=== 1896 ===
1896 Manitoba general election
| Party | Candidate | Votes | % | ±% |
|---|---|---|---|---|
| Liberal | Daniel Hunter McMillan | Acclaimed | – | – |
| Total valid votes | | | – | – |
| Rejected | | N/A | – | |
| Eligible voters / Turnout | | 2,848 | – | – |
Source(s) Source: Manitoba. Chief Electoral Officer (1999). Statement of Votes for the 37th Provincial General Election, September 21, 1999 (PDF) (Report). Winnipeg: Elections Manitoba.

=== 1899 ===
1899 Manitoba general election
| Party | Candidate | Votes | % | ±% |
|---|---|---|---|---|
| Liberal | Daniel Hunter McMillan | 1,364 | 52.20 | – |
| Conservative | A.J. Andrews | 1,249 | 47.80 | – |
| Total valid votes | | 2,613 | – | – |
| Rejected | | N/A | – | |
| Eligible voters / Turnout | | 3,923 | 66.61 | – |
Source(s) Source: Manitoba. Chief Electoral Officer (1999). Statement of Votes for the 37th Provincial General Election, September 21, 1999 (PDF) (Report). Winnipeg: Elections Manitoba.

=== 1900 by-election ===
Manitoba provincial by-election, 1900
| Party | Candidate | Votes | % | ±% |
|---|---|---|---|---|
| Government | Thomas William Taylor | 1,117 | 53.75 | – |
| Opposition | Robert Muir | 961 | 46.25 | – |
| Total valid votes | | 2,078 | – | – |
| Rejected | | N/A | – | |
| Eligible voters / Turnout | | N/A | – | – |
Source(s) Source: Manitoba. Chief Electoral Officer (1999). Statement of Votes for the 37th Provincial General Election, September 21, 1999 (PDF) (Report). Winnipeg: Elections Manitoba.

=== 1903 ===
1903 Manitoba general election
| Party | Candidate | Votes | % | ±% |
|---|---|---|---|---|
| Conservative | Thomas William Taylor | 1,276 | 45.23 | – |
| Liberal | Dr. John A. McArthur | 1,123 | 39.81 | – |
| Labour | William Scott | 422 | 14.96 | – |
| Total valid votes | | 2,821 | – | – |
| Rejected | | N/A | – | |
| Eligible voters / Turnout | | 3,692 | 76.41 | – |
Source(s) Source: Manitoba. Chief Electoral Officer (1999). Statement of Votes for the 37th Provincial General Election, September 21, 1999 (PDF) (Report). Winnipeg: Elections Manitoba.

=== 1907 ===
1907 Manitoba general election
| Party | Candidate | Votes | % | ±% |
|---|---|---|---|---|
| Conservative | Thomas William Taylor | 2,314 | 53.06 | 7.83 |
| Liberal | John Adolphus MacArthur | 2,047 | 46.94 | 7.13 |
| Total valid votes | | 4,361 | – | – |
| Rejected | | N/A | – | |
| Eligible voters / Turnout | | 5,247 | 83.11 | 6.71 |
Source(s) Source: Manitoba. Chief Electoral Officer (1999). Statement of Votes for the 37th Provincial General Election, September 21, 1999 (PDF) (Report). Winnipeg: Elections Manitoba.

=== 1910 ===
1910 Manitoba general election
| Party | Candidate | Votes | % | ±% |
|---|---|---|---|---|
| Conservative | Thomas William Taylor | 2,017 | 49.80 | -3.26 |
| Labour | Fred Dixon | 1,934 | 47.75 | – |
| Socialist | William S. Cummings | 99 | 2.44 | – |
| Total valid votes | | 4,050 | – | – |
| Rejected | | N/A | – | |
| Eligible voters / Turnout | | 5,302 | 76.39 | -6.73 |
Source(s) Source: Manitoba. Chief Electoral Officer (1999). Statement of Votes for the 37th Provincial General Election, September 21, 1999 (PDF) (Report). Winnipeg: Elections Manitoba.

=== 1914 ===
==== Winnipeg Centre A ====
1914 Manitoba general election
| Party | Candidate | Votes | % |
|---|---|---|---|
| Liberal | Thomas Herman Johnson | 7,998 | 50.31 |
| Conservative | A.J. Andrews | 6,948 | 43.70 |
| Labour | William H. "Bill" Hoop | 953 | 5.99 |
| Total valid votes | | 15,899 | – |
| Rejected | | N/A | – |
| Eligible voters / Turnout | | 18,501 | 85.94 |
Source(s) Source: Manitoba. Chief Electoral Officer (1999). Statement of Votes for the 37th Provincial General Election, September 21, 1999 (PDF) (Report). Winnipeg: Elections Manitoba.

==== Winnipeg Centre B ====
1914 Manitoba general election
| Party | Candidate | Votes | % |
|---|---|---|---|
| Liberal | Fred Dixon | 8,205 | 51.85 |
| Conservative | Frederick Joseph Gustin McArthur | 6,692 | 42.29 |
| Labour | George Armstrong | 928 | 5.86 |
| Total valid votes | | 15,825 | – |
| Rejected | | N/A | – |
| Eligible voters / Turnout | | 18,501 | 85.54 |
Source(s) Source: Manitoba. Chief Electoral Officer (1999). Statement of Votes for the 37th Provincial General Election, September 21, 1999 (PDF) (Report). Winnipeg: Elections Manitoba.

=== 1915 ===
==== Winnipeg Centre A ====
1915 Manitoba general election
| Party | Candidate | Votes | % | ±% |
|---|---|---|---|---|
| Liberal | Thomas Herman Johnson | 6,623 | 74.20 | 23.89 |
| Conservative | Andrew James Norquay | 2,303 | 25.80 | -17.90 |
| Total valid votes | | 8,926 | – | – |
| Rejected | | N/A | – | |
| Eligible voters / Turnout | | 13,373 | 66.75 | -19.19 |
Source(s) Source: Manitoba. Chief Electoral Officer (1999). Statement of Votes for the 37th Provincial General Election, September 21, 1999 (PDF) (Report). Winnipeg: Elections Manitoba.

==== Winnipeg Centre B ====
1915 Manitoba general election
| Party | Candidate | Votes | % | ±% |
|---|---|---|---|---|
| Liberal | Fred Dixon | 6,443 | 69.32 | 17.47 |
| Conservative | Hannes Marino Hannesson | 2,048 | 22.03 | -20.25 |
| Labour | George Armstrong | 804 | 8.65 | 2.79 |
| Total valid votes | | 9,295 | – | – |
| Rejected | | N/A | – | |
| Eligible voters / Turnout | | 13,373 | 69.51 | -16.03 |
Source(s) Source: Manitoba. Chief Electoral Officer (1999). Statement of Votes for the 37th Provincial General Election, September 21, 1999 (PDF) (Report). Winnipeg: Elections Manitoba.

=== 1949 ===
1949 Manitoba general election
| Party | Candidate | Votes | % | ±% |
|---|---|---|---|---|
| Liberal–Progressive | Charles Rhodes Smith | 5,140 | 19.37 | – |
| Co-operative Commonwealth | Donovan Swailes | 5,025 | 18.94 | – |
| Co-operative Commonwealth | Gordon Fines | 4,321 | 16.29 | – |
| Liberal–Progressive | Paul Bardal | 3,538 | 13.34 | – |
| Progressive Conservative | Hank Scott | 3,373 | 12.71 | – |
| Co-operative Commonwealth | Mrs. Ina Thompson | 1,741 | 6.56 | – |
| Labor–Progressive | John McNeil | 1,392 | 5.25 | – |
| Independent Liberal | Stephen Juba | 1,155 | 4.35 | – |
| Total valid votes | | 25,685 | – | – |
| Rejected | | 220 | – | |
| Eligible voters / Turnout | | 50,339 | 51.46 | – |
Source(s) Source: Manitoba. Chief Electoral Officer (1999). Statement of Votes for the 37th Provincial General Election, September 21, 1999 (PDF) (Report). Winnipeg: Elections Manitoba.

=== 1953 ===
1953 Manitoba general election
| Party | Candidate | Votes | % | ±% |
|---|---|---|---|---|
| Liberal–Progressive | Jack St. John | 5,119 | 19.43 | -13.28 |
| Co-operative Commonwealth | Donovan Swailes | 4,204 | 15.96 | -25.83 |
| Independent | Stephen Juba | 4,172 | 15.84 | 11.49 |
| Progressive Conservative | Hank Scott | 3,108 | 11.80 | -0.91 |
| Independent | Lewis Stubbs | 2,556 | 9.70 | – |
| Liberal–Progressive | Anne Ethel "Nan" Murphy | 1,991 | 7.56 | -25.15 |
| Co-operative Commonwealth | Gordon Fines | 1,339 | 5.08 | -36.71 |
| Social Credit | Percival W. Brown | 1,132 | 4.30 | – |
| Total valid votes | | 23,621 | – | – |
| Rejected | | 406 | – | |
| Eligible voters / Turnout | | 47,122 | 50.99 | -0.47 |
Source(s) Source: Manitoba. Chief Electoral Officer (1999). Statement of Votes for the 37th Provincial General Election, September 21, 1999 (PDF) (Report). Winnipeg: Elections Manitoba.

=== 1958 ===
1958 Manitoba general election
| Party | Candidate | Votes | % | ±% |
|---|---|---|---|---|
| Progressive Conservative | James Cowan | 3,462 | 55.61 | 43.81 |
| Liberal–Progressive | Paul W. Goodman | 1,623 | 26.07 | -0.92 |
| Co-operative Commonwealth | David Adrian Mulligan | 1,141 | 18.33 | -2.72 |
| Total valid votes | | 6,226 | – | – |
| Rejected | | 58 | – | |
| Eligible voters / Turnout | | 13,730 | 45.77 | -5.22 |
Source(s) Source: Manitoba. Chief Electoral Officer (1999). Statement of Votes for the 37th Provincial General Election, September 21, 1999 (PDF) (Report). Winnipeg: Elections Manitoba.

=== 1959 ===
1959 Manitoba general election
| Party | Candidate | Votes | % | ±% |
|---|---|---|---|---|
| Progressive Conservative | James Cowan | 3,712 | 55.84 | 0.23 |
| Co-operative Commonwealth | Fred Paulley | 1,474 | 22.17 | 3.85 |
| Liberal–Progressive | John Gurzon Harvey | 1,462 | 21.99 | -4.08 |
| Total valid votes | | 6,648 | – | – |
| Rejected | | 63 | – | |
| Eligible voters / Turnout | | 13,424 | 49.99 | 4.22 |
Source(s) Source: Manitoba. Chief Electoral Officer (1999). Statement of Votes for the 37th Provincial General Election, September 21, 1999 (PDF) (Report). Winnipeg: Elections Manitoba.

=== 1962 ===
1962 Manitoba general election
| Party | Candidate | Votes | % | ±% |
|---|---|---|---|---|
| Progressive Conservative | James Cowan | 2,779 | 50.72 | -5.12 |
| Liberal | Francis Bastin "Frank" Lamont | 1,684 | 30.74 | – |
| New Democratic | Donovan Swailes | 1,016 | 18.54 | – |
| Total valid votes | | 5,479 | – | – |
| Rejected | | 110 | – | |
| Eligible voters / Turnout | | 11,282 | 49.54 | -0.45 |
Source(s) Source: Manitoba. Chief Electoral Officer (1999). Statement of Votes for the 37th Provincial General Election, September 21, 1999 (PDF) (Report). Winnipeg: Elections Manitoba.

=== 1966 ===
1966 Manitoba general election
| Party | Candidate | Votes | % | ±% |
|---|---|---|---|---|
| Progressive Conservative | James Cowan | 2,982 | 47.09 | -3.63 |
| Liberal | Ross White | 1,917 | 30.27 | -0.47 |
| New Democratic | Donald Malinowski | 1,434 | 22.64 | 4.10 |
| Total valid votes | | 6,333 | – | – |
| Rejected | | 28 | – | |
| Eligible voters / Turnout | | 12,366 | 51.44 | 1.90 |
Source(s) Source: Manitoba. Chief Electoral Officer (1999). Statement of Votes for the 37th Provincial General Election, September 21, 1999 (PDF) (Report). Winnipeg: Elections Manitoba.

=== 1969 ===
1969 Manitoba general election
| Party | Candidate | Votes | % | ±% |
|---|---|---|---|---|
| New Democratic | Bud Boyce | 2,398 | 51.34 | 28.69 |
| Progressive Conservative | James Cowan | 1,451 | 31.06 | -16.02 |
| Liberal | Joseph Wapemoose | 822 | 17.60 | -12.67 |
| Total valid votes | | 4,671 | – | – |
| Rejected | | 66 | – | |
| Eligible voters / Turnout | | 9,418 | 50.30 | -1.14 |
Source(s) Source: Manitoba. Chief Electoral Officer (1999). Statement of Votes for the 37th Provincial General Election, September 21, 1999 (PDF) (Report). Winnipeg: Elections Manitoba.

=== 1973 ===
1973 Manitoba general election
| Party | Candidate | Votes | % | ±% |
|---|---|---|---|---|
| New Democratic | Bud Boyce | 3,010 | 53.12 | 1.79 |
| Progressive Conservative | Robert Wilson | 1,520 | 26.83 | -4.24 |
| Liberal | Ken Arenson | 1,092 | 19.27 | 1.67 |
| Social Credit | Ed Storozuk | 44 | 0.78 | – |
| Total valid votes | | 5,666 | – | – |
| Rejected | | 55 | – | |
| Eligible voters / Turnout | | 8,343 | 68.57 | 18.28 |
Source(s) Source: Manitoba. Chief Electoral Officer (1999). Statement of Votes for the 37th Provincial General Election, September 21, 1999 (PDF) (Report). Winnipeg: Elections Manitoba.

=== 1977 ===
1977 Manitoba general election
| Party | Candidate | Votes | % | ±% |
|---|---|---|---|---|
| New Democratic | Bud Boyce | 2,217 | 48.93 | -4.19 |
| Progressive Conservative | Philip S. Lee | 1,587 | 35.03 | 8.20 |
| Liberal | Ken Wong | 727 | 16.05 | -3.23 |
| Total valid votes | | 4,531 | – | – |
| Rejected | | 6 | – | |
| Eligible voters / Turnout | | 7,843 | 57.85 | -10.72 |
Source(s) Source: Manitoba. Chief Electoral Officer (1999). Statement of Votes for the 37th Provincial General Election, September 21, 1999 (PDF) (Report). Winnipeg: Elections Manitoba.

== See also ==
- List of Manitoba provincial electoral districts
- Canadian provincial electoral districts
