= Leven, East Riding of Yorkshire =

Village and civil parish in the East Riding of Yorkshire, England

Coordinates: 53°53′27″N 0°18′57″W

Leven
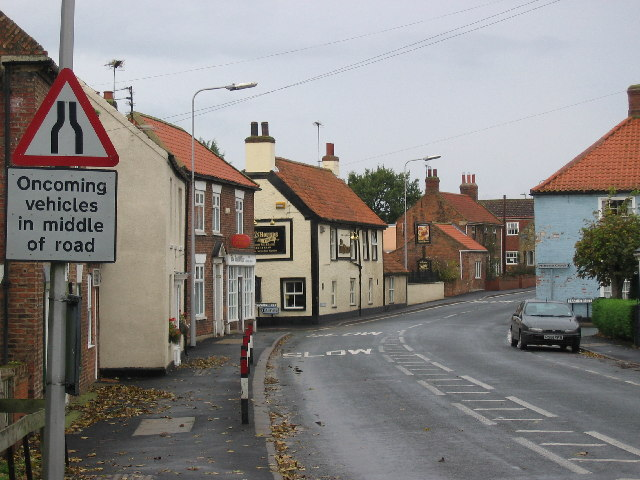
- Main street, Leven

- Location within the East Riding of Yorkshire
- Population: 2,433 (2011 census)
- OS grid reference: TA106452
  - London: 165 mi (266 km) S
- Civil parish: Leven
- Unitary authority: East Riding of Yorkshire
- Ceremonial county: East Riding of Yorkshire
- Region: Yorkshire and the Humber
- Country: England
- Sovereign state: United Kingdom
- Post town: BEVERLEY
- Postcode district: HU17
- Dialling code: 01964
- Police: Humberside
- Fire: Humberside
- Ambulance: Yorkshire
- UK Parliament: Beverley and Holderness

Leven is a village and civil parish in the East Riding of Yorkshire, England. It is situated approximately 7 miles (11 km) west of Hornsea town centre, and north-west of the A165 road.

According to the 2011 UK census, Leven parish had a population of 2,433, an increase on the 2001 UK census figure of 2,240.

== History ==
It is believed that the village of Little Leven - immediately west of the present village - began as far back as the days of the Ancient Britons, though Neolithic and Bronze Age human occupation of the area is known. Finds from Leven 'Carrs' (marshy land) have included axe heads, leaf-shaped swords, and a spearhead.

Three quarters of a mile west of Little Leven, at Hall Garth, is the site of Leven's former parish church - St Faith's - which was in use between 1350 and 1843. It is thought that the original village of Leven was sited in its immediate vicinity though archaeological understanding of that area is sparse.

In 1823 Leven (then spelt 'Leaven'), was a civil parish in the Wapentake and Liberty of Holderness. The patronage of the church was under Sir William Pennyman. Population at the time was 658. Occupations included eight farmers, three wheelwrights, two blacksmiths, two butchers, three corn millers, five shoemakers, two maltsters, two grocers, a bricklayer, a schoolmaster, a parish clerk, and the landlords of The Minerva and the Blue Bell public houses. Four carriers operated between the village and Beverley and Hull twice weekly. There were two other carriers: one taking post by foot to Hornsea four times a week; and another to Hull once a week by water transport. Residents included the parish rector, three yeomen, a gentleman, and a merchant.

The 1892 Bulmer's Directory of Hull and the East Riding states that the Manor of Leven was given to the Church of St John of Beverley by Edward the Confessor, and is listed in the Domesday Book as being amongst its possessions.

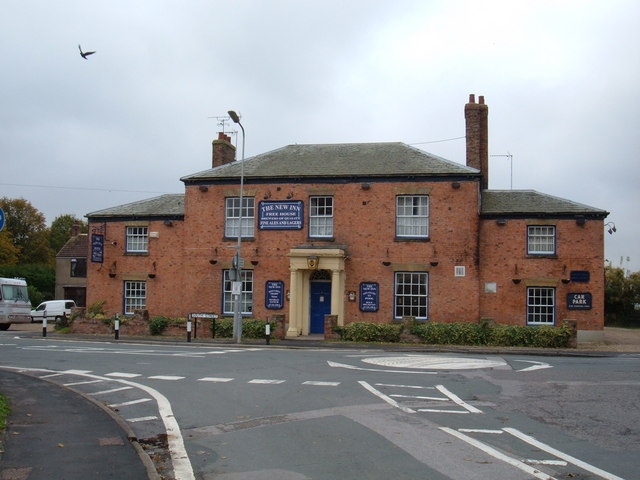
The New Inn

There was a proposal to build a Leven railway station as part of the North Holderness Light Railway but despite appearing on tile maps at several North Eastern Railway stations, the line was never constructed.

Leven was a small village with 683 inhabitants until 1961, after which a private housing estate was built (Barley Gate, Mill Drive, Westlands Way, Balk Close), and the village expanded to become a dormitory for workers mainly from Hull and Beverley. The population is now over 2,500. The village has two public houses: The New Inn and The Hare and Hounds as well as a member's club featuring live entertainment each week. Leven has amateur football, cricket and bowling teams.

After a long campaign by residents, a bypass was built for the A165 road around the eastern side of the village and opened in May 1994.

== Landmarks ==
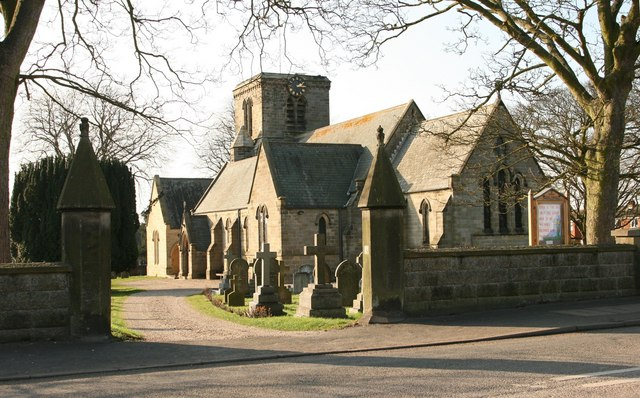
Holy Trinity Church

The Anglican Holy Trinity Church, Leven was designated a Grade II* listed building in 1968 and is now recorded in the National Heritage List for England, maintained by Historic England.

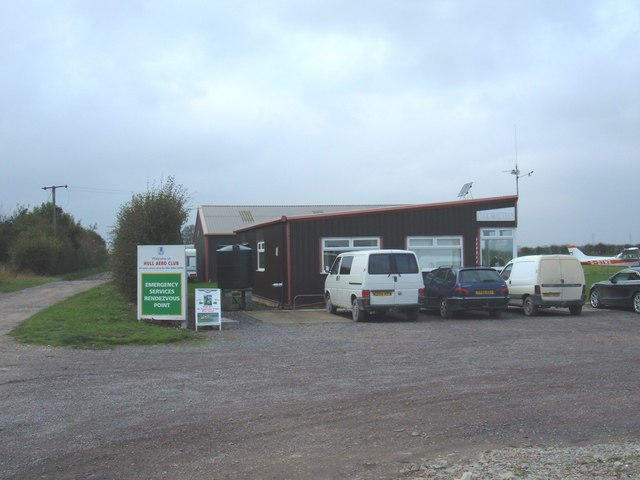
Hull Aero Club

Leven Canal, a Site of Special Scientific Interest links the village to the River Hull, although it is now closed. The canal was opened in 1804 having been cut by the order of Mrs Charlotte Bethel, Lady of the Manor. The 3 1/4-mile long canal started at the River Hull and was constructed to allow sailing barges to reach the warehouses at Canal Head on the southern edge of the village. Two warehouses were constructed in 1825 for storing of local grain ready for barge transport, and a depository for incoming coal.

Linley Hill Airfield is nearby and is used for flying activities. Users include Hull Aero Club which was founded in the 1920s and numbered Amy Johnson among former members.

== Notable people ==
The Canadian politician George Dinsdale was born in Leven in 1887.

== See also ==
- Listed buildings in Leven, East Riding of Yorkshire
