= Bud Boyce =

Canadian politician (1924–1984)

Joseph Russell (Bud) Boyce
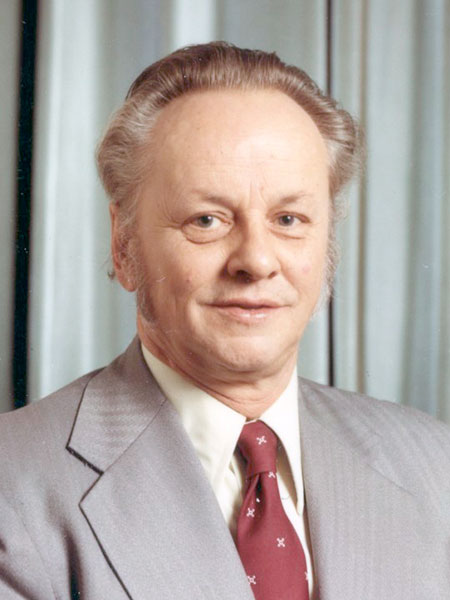
- Boyce, c. 1969

Member of the Legislative Assembly of Manitoba for Winnipeg Centre
- In office June 25, 1969 – November 17, 1981
- Preceded by: Jim Cowan
- Succeeded by: riding dissolved

Personal details
- Born: March 20, 1924 Saint John, New Brunswick
- Died: March 16, 1984 (aged 59) Saskatoon, Saskatchewan
- Party: New Democrat (1969–1981); Progressive (1981)
- Spouse: Deloris Elizabeth Boyce
- Children: 3
- Education: University of Manitoba

Joseph Russell "Bud" Boyce (March 20, 1924 in Saint John, New Brunswick – March 16, 1984) was a politician in Manitoba, Canada. He was a member of the Legislative Assembly of Manitoba from 1969 to 1981, and served in the cabinet of Edward Schreyer. Initially a New Democrat, Boyce became a Progressive in 1981.

== Early life and career ==
Boyce grew up in Elm Creek, Manitoba, was educated at the University of Manitoba, and served as a signalman in the Royal Canadian Navy Volunteer Reserve from 1941 to 1945. He later served as a school councillor at St. John's Technical High School. He supported Sidney Green for the leadership of the provincial NDP in 1968 and 1969.

== Provincial politics ==
He was first elected to the Manitoba legislature in the provincial election of 1969, defeating incumbent Progressive Conservative Jim Cowan by almost 1,000 votes in the riding of Winnipeg Centre under the slogan "Bud Boyce, your choice." He was not appointed to cabinet in the legislative term which followed, although he served as Deputy Speaker for a few months in 1971. In 1973, he was re-elected by an increased majority over Tory candidate Robert Wilson.

On June 26, 1974, Boyce entered cabinet as the Minister responsible for Corrections and Rehabilitations. He held this position until the Schreyer government was defeated in the 1977 election. Boyce was re-elected in the 1977 election, defeating Tory candidate Philip S. Lee with a reduced majority. In 1979, he supported Sidney Green's unsuccessful bid to become interim leader of the provincial NDP.

On March 3, 1981, Boyce announced that he was joining Green's new Progressive Party of Manitoba, along with fellow New Democratic MLA Ben Hanuschak. He ran for re-election in the redistributed riding of Fort Rouge in the 1981 election, but fared poorly, receiving only 243 votes.

== Death ==
After being defeated, Boyce worked as a consultant. He died at home in Saskatoon, Saskatchewan in 1984, before the next election was held.
