= Listed buildings in Leven, East Riding of Yorkshire =

Leven is a civil parish in the county of the East Riding of Yorkshire, England. It contains 14 listed buildings that are recorded in the National Heritage List for England. Of these, one is listed at Grade II*, the middle of the three grades, and the others are at Grade II, the lowest grade. The parish contains the village of Leven and the surrounding countryside. The listed buildings consist of houses, a church and a war memorial in the churchyard, an aqueduct and a bridge, a gravestone, a former toll house, a public house, a former coach house, and a former police station.

== Key ==
| Grade | Criteria |
|---|---|
| II* | Particularly important buildings of more than special interest |
| II | Buildings of national importance and special interest |

== Buildings ==
| Name and location | Photograph | Date | Notes | Grade |
|---|---|---|---|---|
| 3 East Street; 53.89268°N 0.31731°W | | Late 17th to early 18th century | The house is in pebbledashed and colourwashed brick on a plinth, with floor bands, a brick eaves cornice, and a pantile roof. There are two storeys and three bays. On the front is a doorway, and the windows are sashes, those on the ground floor tripartite, and those on the top floor horizontally sliding. | II |
| Gravestone, Hall Garth; 53.89442°N 0.34109°W | — | 1741 | The gravestone is in the cemetery of the former St Faith's Church at Hall Garth, and is to the northeast of the house. It is in limestone, with an inscription, and the top has a sinuous M-shape. | II |
| Causeway Bridge; 53.89334°N 0.32571°W | | Late 18th century | The bridge carries West Street over the Barff Drain. It is in red brick, and consists of a single elliptical arch under a brick-coped parapet with straight splays. | II |
| Corner House; 53.89268°N 0.31749°W | | Late 18th century | The house is in colourwashed brick, with a dentilled brick eaves cornice, and a pantile roof, hipped on the left. There are two storeys and two bays. The doorway on the right bay has pilasters, a fanlight in a panelled soffit and reveals, and a projecting cornice. The windows are sashes, the ground floor window with a channelled wedge lintel. | II |
| White Cross Cottage; 53.87846°N 0.31333°W | | Late 18th century | A toll house, later a private house, with two storeys, three bays, the middle bay projecting slightly, and an embattled parapet. The doorways on the outer bays have fanlights, and the windows are sashes with intersecting glazing bars. All the openings are under ogee gauged brick arches. | II |
| The New Inn; 53.8894168°N 0.31630°W | | c. 1810 | The public house is colourwashed, with bracketed timber eaves cornices, and hipped slate roofs. There are two storeys and three bays, and flanking lower two-storey single-bay wings. In the centre is a Tuscan porch with an entablature and a blocking course, and a doorway with radial glazing. The windows are sashes with cambered channelled wedge lintels and raised keystones. | II |
| Aqueduct, Sandholme Farm; 53.88939°N 0.32596°W | | 1802 | The aqueduct carries the Leven Canal over the Barff Drain. It is in red brick, and consists of three segmental arches under the parapet of the towpath of the canal. | II |
| Leven House; 53.88376°N 0.31474°W | — | c. 1816 | The house is in light brown brick, with stone dressings, a timber eaves cornice on paired brackets, and a hipped slate roof. There are two storeys and three bays. In the centre is a Doric porch with an entablature and a blocking course, and a doorway with a fanlight, above which is a sash window. These are flanked by two-storey canted bay windows with segmental-curved sides, and sash windows with wedge lintels. | II |
| 85 East Street; 53.89262°N 0.30976°W | — | Early 19th century | The house is in brown brick, and has a pantile roof with tumbled-in brick to the raised gables. There are two storeys and three bays. The doorway with a fanlight is in the left bay, and the windows are sashes; all the openings have pointed arches and Gothic glazing bars. | II |
| Coach house, Heigholme Hall; 53.90605°N 0.33731°W | | Early 19th century | The coach house, later a private house, is in red brick, with stone dressings, a moulded eaves cornice, and a slate roof. There are two storeys and three bays, the middle bay projecting under a low pediment. In the centre is an elliptical rusticated arch with projecting imposts and a raised keystone. Above this is a Diocletian window with a rusticated surround and a keystone, over which is a shield with a monogram. The outer bays contain doorways with fanlights under elliptical rusticated arches, and on the upper floor are oculi with keystones in rusticated surrounds. On the roof is a timber lantern with round-headed windows, surmounted by a pyramidal lead dome with a flying-duck weathervane. | II |
| Westfield; 53.89234°N 0.32201°W | — | Early 19th century | The house is in yellow-brown brick with a hipped slate roof. There are two storeys, three bays, and a continuous rear outshut. The central doorway has pilasters, a fanlight in panelled reveals and a soffit, and a projecting cornice. The windows are sashes under slightly cambered gauged brick arches. | II |
| Holy Trinity Church; 53.89153°N 0.31768°W | | 1843–45 | The church, which was designed by R. D. Chantrell and later extended, is in gritstone and limestone with slate roofs. It consists of a nave, a south aisle, a south porch, north and south transepts, a chancel and a west tower. The tower has three stages, an octagonal stair turret to the south, a plinth, buttresses, paired lancet bell openings with a hood mould, a corbel table, and a low coped parapet. The windows in the body of the church are lancets. | II* |
| 27 High Style; 53.89057°N 0.31365°W | — | 1852 | A police station designed by G. T. Andrews and later used for other purposes, it is in grey brick on a plinth, with stone dressings, rusticated quoins, moulded sill bands, a bracketed timber eaves cornice, oversailing eaves, and a hipped slate roof. There are two storeys and three bays, and a single-storey, single-bay extension on the right. The central doorway has a round arch with a sunk moulded panel, a rusticated surround with imposts, and a fanlight with a moulded surround. The windows are sashes, those on the ground floor with cambered gauged brick arches. | II |
| War memorial 53.89163°N 0.31718°W | | c. 1920 | The war memorial is in the churchyard of Holy Trinity Church, to the east of the church. It is in limestone, and consists of a Latin cross with the initials "IHS", and foliage bosses. It stands on an octagonal pillar with a capital and a square base, on a square pedestal on a plinth of one step. On the pedestal and the plinth are inscriptions and the names of those lost in the two World Wars. | II |
