= Janice Filmon =

25th Lieutenant Governor of Manitoba

The Honourable Janice Filmon OC OM
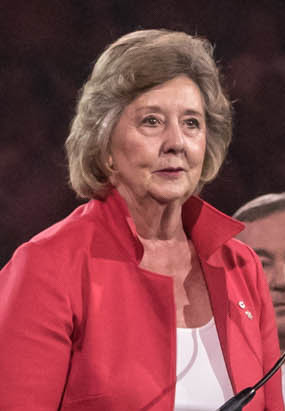
- Filmon in July 2017

25th Lieutenant Governor of Manitoba
- In office June 19, 2015 – October 24, 2022
- Monarchs: Elizabeth II; Charles III
- Governors General: David Johnston; Julie Payette; Mary Simon
- Premier: Greg Selinger; Brian Pallister; Kelvin Goertzen; Heather Stefanson
- Preceded by: Philip S. Lee
- Succeeded by: Anita Neville

Personal details
- Born: Janice Clare Wainwright c. 1943 (age 82–83) Winnipeg, Manitoba, Canada
- Spouse: Gary Filmon (m. c. 1963)
- Children: 4
- Education: University of Manitoba (BSc)
- Occupation: Social worker, community activist

Janice Clare Filmon OC OM (née Wainwright; born c. 1943) is a Canadian former social worker who served as the 25th lieutenant governor of Manitoba from 2015 to 2022. Her appointment became effective June 19, 2015. She was the viceregal representative of Queen Elizabeth II and King Charles III of Canada in the Province of Manitoba.

== Early life ==
Filmon was born around 1943. A social worker, philanthropist and community activist, she was made a member of the Order of Canada in 2012 and the Order of Manitoba in 2007. She is the chair of the CancerCare Manitoba Foundation and founder of the A Leadership Initiative in Voluntary Efforts (A.L.I.V.E.) volunteer program. She was born in Winnipeg and was a 1964 graduate from the University of Manitoba with a Bachelor of Science degree in home economics. Her husband is Gary Filmon, a former premier of Manitoba; they have four children.

== Lieutenant governor ==
On March 19, 2015, Filmon was appointed by Governor General of Canada David Johnston on the advice of Prime Minister Stephen Harper to be the next Lieutenant Governor of Manitoba, replacing Philip S. Lee. As the viceregal representative in Manitoba, she was styled "Her Honour" while in office and will have the right to the style "the Honourable" for life.

== Arms and honours ==
=== Coat of arms ===
Filmon was granted a coat of arms through Grant of Arms and Supporters, with differences to Allison Joy Filmon, David Clark Filmon, Gregg Alan Filmon and Susanna Clare Filmon, on May 15, 2019.

Coat of arms of Janice Filmon

Granted
2019
Crest
An American robin proper, holding in its beak an annulus Sable, wearing a coronet of prairie crocuses Purpure and perched on a nest bearing four eggs proper.
Escutcheon
Argent a maple tree eradicated Purpure, its leaves Bleu Céleste, Azure, Gules and Vert, its roots voided of a heart.
Supporters
Two doves Argent beaked and legged Sable, their wings embellished Bleu Céleste, Azure, Vert and Gules, their exterior wings elevated, each wearing a coronet of prairie crocuses Purpure and standing on a field of wheat proper above a bar wavy Bleu Céleste.
Motto
JOY IN SERVICE • LOVE OF FAMILY

Order of precedence
Preceded by Philip S. Lee as the 24th Lieutenant Governor of Manitoba	Order of precedence in Manitoba as the 25th Lieutenant Governor of Manitoba	Succeeded by Edward Schreyer as the 18th Premier of Manitoba
