= Jack St. John =

Canadian politician

Jack St. John (September 20, 1906 in Portage la Prairie, Manitoba – May 7, 1965) was a politician in Manitoba, Canada. He served in the Legislative Assembly of Manitoba as a Liberal-Progressive from 1953 to 1958.

The son of Bertram A. St. John, he was educated in Portage la Prairie and Winnipeg, and worked as a pharmacist, druggist and small businessman. He was an alderman in the City of Winnipeg from 1944 to 1953, sitting with the conservative Civic Election Committee group.

St. John was a member of the University of Manitoba varsity hockey team which won the Allan Cup in 1928. He later played professional ice hockey in Kansas City, St. Louis and Buffalo. He played 46 games with the St. Louis Flyers in the 1931–32 season, and achieved three goals, one assist and twenty-two penalty minutes. (He had also played three games for the Kansas City Pla-Mors in the 1930–31 season, scoring no points.)

In 1942, he married Ragna Johnson.

He was elected to the Manitoba legislature in the 1953 provincial election, finishing third in the four-member constituency of Winnipeg Centre. He served as a backbench supporter of Douglas Campbell's government during his time in the legislature, and was known for opposing prison reforms.

Manitoba's electoral map was dramatically redrawn prior to the 1958 election, and Winnipeg's multi-member constituencies were eliminated. St. John ran for re-election in the single-member constituency of Wellington, but finished third against Progressive Conservative Richard Seaborn.

St. John died at home in Winnipeg at the age of 58.
