= Paul Bardal =

Canadian politician

Paul Bardal (November 5, 1889 in Winnipeg, Manitoba – February 6, 1966) was a politician in Manitoba, Canada. He served in the Legislative Assembly of Manitoba as a Liberal-Progressive MLA from 1941 to 1945, and again from 1949 to 1953.

Bardal was born to Paul Bardal and Dora Bjornson, Icelandic immigrants living in Winnipeg, and was educated in the city. He became the director of A.S. Bardal, Funeral Directors, and was an alderman in the City of Winnipeg from 1931 to 1941. He married Oddny Bergson in 1926. Bardal was also a member of the British and Foreign Bible Society, and a director of the Winnipeg Symphony Orchestra.

He first ran for the Manitoba legislature in the 1936 provincial election, in the constituency of Winnipeg (which elected ten members by a single transferable ballot). He finished sixteenth out of twenty-one candidates on the first ballot, and was eliminated on the seventh count.

He ran again in the 1941 election, and this time finished twelfth out of twenty-seven candidates on the first count. He did well on transfers, and was elected to the eighth seat in the city. From 1941 to 1945, he was a backbench supporter of the ministries of John Bracken and Stuart Garson.

The Cooperative Commonwealth Federation polled well in Winnipeg in the 1945 provincial election, and helped to push Bardal to fifteenth place out of twenty candidates on the first ballot. He was eliminated on the eleventh count.

Winnipeg's electoral map was redrawn prior to the 1949 provincial election, and the city's single ten-member constituency was replaced with three four-member constituencies. Bardal sought a return to the legislature in Winnipeg Centre. Although he finished fifth out of nine candidates on the first ballot, he did well enough to transfers to defeat Progressive Conservative candidate Hank Scott for the final seat, by a margin of only 200 votes. For the next four years, he served as a backbench supporter to Douglas Campbell's government.

In March 1953, the Liberal-Progressive Party announced that it would nominate three candidates in Winnipeg Centre. Bardal declared himself a candidate, but could not attend the nomination meeting due to an illness. He was defeated by three other candidates, and left the legislature after serving out the remainder of his term.

His brother Sigurgeir was a prominent physician in Manitoba.
