= Leslie McDorman =

Canadian politician

Leslie Hill McDorman (January 19, 1879 – May 19, 1966) was a politician in Manitoba, Canada. He served in the Legislative Assembly of Manitoba from 1945 to 1949 as a Liberal-Progressive. He was elected to the Manitoba legislature in the 1945 provincial election, representing the constituency of Brandon.

He was born in Great Village, Nova Scotia and came to Brandon, Manitoba around 1901. McDorman was mayor of Brandon from 1944 to 1945.

McDorman's won the seat as the result of a local division in the Cooperative Commwealth Federation. Dwight Johnson had previously been elected for Brandon as a CCF candidate in a 1943 by-election, but was suspended from the party on suspicions of holding communist sympathies. He ran for re-election as an "Independent CCF" candidate, and the local CCF organization fielded a candidate against him. This division in the left allowed McDorman to win a fairly easy victory.

He served as a government backbencher for the next four years, supporting the administrations of Stuart Garson and Douglas Campbell. McDorman did not seek re-election in 1949.

He died in Rivers at the age of 87 and was buried in Brandon.
