= Beresford Richards =

Canadian politician

Member of the Legislative Assembly of Manitoba for The Pas
- In office August 17, 1943 – November 10, 1949
- Preceded by: John Bracken
- Succeeded by: Francis Bud Jobin

Personal details
- Born: August 26, 1914 Aiegnmouth, Cornwall, England
- Died: May 1982
- Party: Cooperative Commonwealth Federation
- Education: University of Alberta
- Occupation: Mining engineer

Beresford "Berry" Richards (August 26, 1914, Aiegnmouth, Cornwall, England – May 1982) was a politician in Manitoba, Canada. He served in the Legislative Assembly of Manitoba from 1943 to 1949. Elected as a candidate of the Cooperative Commonwealth Federation, he was twice expelled from that party during his tenure in the legislature.

Richards's father, Beresford Walter Richards, was a member of the Canadian Authors' Association. The younger Richards came to Canada in 1921, and was educated in Athabaska, Alberta and at the University of Alberta in Edmonton, receiving a Bachelor of Science degree in Mining Engineering.

== Career ==
He was first elected to the Manitoba legislature in a by-election held in The Pas on August 17, 1943, to replace former premier John Bracken after the latter's move to federal politics. Although the CCF had never elected a candidate in The Pas, Richards won an overwhelming victory against three opponents. During this campaign, he ran on a platform advocating socialism as it had been introduced by the Labour government of New Zealand. The CCF was the dominant opposition party in Manitoba during this period, and Richards sat with his party on the opposition benches.

Richards was a charismatic personality, known for a powerful debating style and flamboyant manner of dressing. He was soon appointed to the provincial CCF executive as the party's chief organizer, and built a powerful constituency base within the party. At one time, the CCF organization in The Pas was the largest in the province. Richards was a maverick on the left wing of the CCF, and the similarity of his views with those of the communist Labor-Progressive Party made him many enemies in his own party.

In a 1945 letter to the Manitoba CCF executive committee, Richards and fellow maverick Dwight Johnson called for cooperation with other left-wing and progressive parties against the Progressive Conservatives in the upcoming federal election. Their position was identical to that promoted by the Labour Progressive Party, and many in the CCF leadership believed that Richards and Johnson were directly influenced by the LPP. The CCF leadership, including Stanley Knowles and Donovan Swailes, forcefully opposed Richards and Johnson's position. The party was especially upset at Richards's decision to meet with the CCF executive in Portage la Prairie, to discuss the possibility of running a "united front" candidate of the left.

Richards and Johnson were soon marginalized in the party. Stanley Knowles accused Richards of holding Communist sympathies at party gathering, and Richards was deliberately left uninformed of executive meetings. Denied the opportunity to promote his position in the CCF newspaper, Richards read a statement in the provincial legislature during the 1945 session, calling for cooperation with other progressive parties and advocating friendly relations with the Soviet Union. In making this statement, he also accused the CCF leadership of suppressing debate within party channels.

Richards later claimed that the party leadership had been "embarking on a right wing course" by its actions during this period. Ironically, some CCF members interpreted the Richards-Johnson position as a shift away from socialism, in that the "broad left" coalition they were advocating included left-leaning members of the Liberal Party. Many party members supported Richards and Johnson in their battles against the CCF hierarchy, however, and Richards in particular remained very popular with his riding association.

== Suspension ==
Richards and Johnson were both suspended from the CCF by the provincial council in 1945, by a vote of 33 to 5. Although the council could not expel members from the party, the two MLAs were immediately expelled from the CCF legislative caucus.

In the 1945 federal election, Richards supported federal Cooperative Commonwealth Federation candidate Ronald Moore in the riding of Churchill, on the grounds that Moore was the candidate best positioned to defeat the Progressive Conservative candidate. Moore was, in fact, elected.

A few months later, Richards ran for re-election in the 1945 provincial election as an "Independent CCF" candidate. He convinced the local CCF organization not to field a candidate against him, and was re-elected over Progressive Conservative candidate Robert Milton by 81 votes.

Richards wrote a conciliatory appeal to the Manitoba CCF after the election, and asked for reinstatement. At the party's general convention in December 1945, he was re-admitted to the party by a delegated vote of 80 to 35. Stanley Knowles continued to oppose him, but was in Britain when the convention took place.

Richards continued to support cooperation among left parties and to advocate friendly relations with the Soviet Union, but he avoided open criticism of the party leadership. In the legislature, he was known as the CCF's most skilled debater.

Richards was nominated from the convention floor for the leadership of the Manitoba CCF in 1948, following the resignation of Seymour Farmer the previous year, but declined to run and Edwin Hansford was elected the new party leader without opposition.

Even after his reinstatement, Richards's views continued to create tensions with others in the CCF. In 1948, he successfully passed a motion at the party's general convention calling for opposition to America's foreign policy in Europe. Similarly, in March 1949, he was the only other CCF caucus member who did not repudiate statements made by St. Clements MLA Wilbert Doneleyko, denouncing the Marshall Plan and plans for an Atlantic Treaty as a new American hegemony. Shortly thereafter, both Richards and Doneleyko signed a letter calling for the CCF to oppose the emerging North Atlantic Treaty Organization.

After this letter was circulated, Stanley Knowles and Donovan Swailes again accused Richards of adopting Communist tactics to disrupt the CCF. At the party's 1949 convention, Richards and Doneleyko were expelled from the party by a vote of 56 to 18. The next day, the party passed a resolution in support of NATO.

Richards again ran as an "Independent CCF" candidate in the 1949 election, and was again endorsed by the local CCF association. However, at the behest of the provincial executive, a rival party organization was created in The Pas and an official CCF candidate nominated. Both candidates were resoundingly defeated by Liberal Francis Bud Jobin, who took nearly three times as many votes as Richards.

== Election loss ==
The loss ended Richards's political career. He quietly rejoined the CCF in the 1950s, but never again sought provincial or federal office.

Lloyd Stinson, who led the Manitoba CCF from 1952 to 1959, once wrote the following about Richards:

Berry Richards' defection from the CCF was a matter of great regret to many people. He had made friends among the membership and the highly regarded as an organizer, particularly in the rural areas. He was clever, quick in debate, young and handsome, attractive to both men and women; if he had been able to adhere to CCF policy he undoubtedly would have become provincial leader. With his ruthless philosophy, acid tongue and uncompromising attitude, it is my firm opinion that Richards would have been a disaster as leader." (Lloyd Stinson, Political Warriors, Winnipeg: Queenston House Publishing Inc., 1975, pp. 105–06.)

Richards returned to his profession as a mining engineer after leaving politics. In 1986, W.O. Kupsch and S.D. Hanson published a work entitled, "Gold and Other Stories as told to Berry Richards : Prospecting and Mining in Northern Saskatchewan".
