= Dwight Johnson (politician) =

Canadian politician (1898–1972)

Dwight Lyman Johnson (March 26, 1898 – June 3, 1972) was a physician and a politician in Manitoba, Canada. He served in the Legislative Assembly of Manitoba from 1943 to 1945. Elected as a member of the Manitoba Cooperative Commonwealth Federation, Johnson had a tenuous relationship with the party leadership and was expelled from the party caucus in 1945. After leaving the legislature, he became a member of the communist Labor-Progressive Party.

Johnson was born in Rapid City, Manitoba. His ancestors had moved from Pennsylvania to Ontario in the late eighteenth century. Many were Quakers, and almost all were farmers. He was educated in Rapid City, and at the Brandon Normal School, Brandon College and the Manitoba Medical College. He received a degree in medicine in 1926.

He served in the ranks of the 27th Battalion during World War I, and was awarded a Military Medal and recommended for a commission. From 1926 to 1931, he served in the Philippines as a hospital superintendent. On returning to Manitoba, he served on the Brandon School Board and the Brandon Health Unit from 1937 to 1943.

Johnson became politically active during this period. He was a member of the Brandon Reconstruction Club in the 1930s, a local division of the Canadian League for Social Reconstruction. In 1936, he became a vice-president of the Brandon CCF club. Johnson was a vocal proponent of socialism, and criticized others in the party who were reluctant to use the term openly.

He was elected to the Manitoba legislature in a by-election held in the Brandon constituency on November 18, 1943. Along with Beresford Richards, who had been elected for The Pas earlier in the year, he soon became a prominent figure on the party's left-wing. The CCF was the official opposition party during this period, and Johnson distinguished himself in the legislature as his party's health and welfare critic.

Since the 1930s, Johnson had called for cooperation among Canada's left-wing parties. In 1945, this position caused both Johnson and Richards to be expelled from the CCF caucus. Johnson and Richards argued that the CCF should promote friendly relations with the Soviet Union after World War II, and should seek cooperation with other progressive and working-class parties to prevent the Conservatives from returning to power at the federal level. This strategy of cooperation was identical to that favoured by the Labor-Progressive Party in 1945. Many in the CCF believed Johnson and Richards were directly influenced by the LPP, and accused them of disrupting the party. After Richards made their position public in a speech to the legislature, the provincial CCF council suspended both MLAs from the party.

Johnson and Richards sat in the legislature as independent members, and sought re-election as "Independent CCF" candidates in the 1945 provincial election. Richards was re-elected, and later returned to the CCF fold. Johnson faced opposition from an official CCF candidate, however, and finished third. The winner in Brandon was Leslie McDorman from the Liberal-Progressive party. Johnson appealed for reinstatement to the CCF after the election, but was rejected at the party's December 1945 convention.

Unlike Richards, whose motivations in 1945 have been described as "naive and confused", Johnson's personal philosophy had shifted to Marxism by this period. He joined the Labor-Progressive Party a few years after his expulsion from the CCF. In 1949, he accused social democratic parties such as the CCF of being traitors to the working-class and of propping up the existing capitalist order.

Johnson ran as an independent candidate in the riding of Brandon in the 1949 federal election. Neither the CCF nor the LPP endorsed an official candidate, leaving Johnson as the de facto candidate of a united left. He finished a distant third, behind Liberal James Ewen Matthews . Johnson later attended the Asia and Pacific Rim Peace Conference in the People's Republic of China in 1952, during the period of the Korean War.
