= 12th Manitoba Legislature =

The members of the 12th Manitoba Legislature were elected in the Manitoba general election held in March 1907. The legislature sat from January 2, 1908, to June 30, 1910.

The Conservatives led by Rodmond Roblin formed the government.

Charles Mickle of the Liberal Party served as Leader of the Opposition. After Mickle was named a judge in 1909, Tobias Norris became party leader and leader of the opposition.

James Johnson served as speaker for the assembly.

There were three sessions of the 12th Legislature:

Session	Start	End
1st	January 2, 1908	February 26, 1908
2nd	February 4, 1909	March 10, 1909
3rd	February 10, 1910	March 16, 1910

Daniel Hunter McMillan was Lieutenant Governor of Manitoba.

== Members of the Assembly ==
The following members were elected to the assembly in 1907:

Member	Electoral district	Party	First elected / previously elected	No.# of term(s)
John Williams	Arthur	Liberal	1907	1st term
Aimé Bénard	Assiniboia	Conservative	1907	1st term
James Argue	Avondale	Conservative	1899	3rd term
James H. Howden	Beautiful Plains	Conservative	1903	2nd term
Charles Mickle	Birtle	Liberal	1888	6th term
George Malcolm (1909)	Birtle	Liberal	1909	1st term
Stanley McInnis	Brandon City	Conservative	1899	3rd term
George R. Coldwell (1907)	Brandon City	Conservative	1907	1st term
Alfred Carroll	Brandon South	Conservative	1903	2nd term
Albert Prefontaine	Carillon	Conservative	1903	2nd term
George Steel	Cypress	Conservative	1899	3rd term
John A. Campbell	Dauphin	Liberal	1907	1st term
Robert Stirton Thornton	Deloraine	Liberal	1907	1st term
Rodmond Roblin	Dufferin	Conservative	1888, (Note: Dufferin North) 1896	6th term*
George Walton	Emerson	Liberal	1907	1st term
Glenlyon Campbell	Gilbert Plains	Conservative	1903	2nd term
Duncan Cameron (1908)	Gilbert Plains	Conservative	1908	1st term
Sigtryggur Jonasson	Gimli	Liberal	1896, (Note: St. Andrews) 1907	2nd term*
James William Armstrong	Gladstone	Liberal	1907	1st term
William Ferguson	Hamiota	Conservative	1899, (Note: Saskatchewan) 1907	2nd term*
Orton Grain	Kildonan and St. Andrews	Conservative	1899, 1907	2nd term*
George Lawrence	Killarney	Conservative	1899	3rd term
Edwin D. Lynch	Lakeside	Conservative	1903	2nd term
Tobias Norris	Lansdowne	Liberal	1896, 1907	3rd term*
Jean Lauzon	La Verendrye	Conservative	1897, (Note: St. Boniface) 1907	2nd term*
Robert Rogers	Manitou	Conservative	1899	3rd term
William B. Waddell	Minnedosa	Conservative	1903	2nd term
Benjamin McConnell	Morden	Liberal	1907	1st term
Colin Campbell	Morris	Conservative	1899	3rd term
James Bryson Baird	Mountain	Liberal	1907	1st term
Robert Fern Lyons	Norfolk	Conservative	1892, 1899	4th term*
Hugh Armstrong	Portage la Prairie	Conservative	1892, (Note: Woodlands) 1902	4th term*
Valentine Winkler	Rhineland	Liberal	1892	5th term
Isaac Riley	Rockwood	Conservative	1899	3rd term
Angus Bonnycastle	Russell	Conservative	1907	1st term
Joseph Bernier	St. Boniface	Conservative	1900, 1907	2nd term*
Donald A. Ross	Springfield	Liberal	1907	1st term
James Wells Robson	Swan River	Conservative	1903	2nd term
James Johnson	Turtle Mountain	Conservative	1897	4th term
John Hume Agnew	Virden	Conservative	1903	2nd term
Harvey Simpson (1909)	Virden	Conservative	1909	1st term
Thomas William Taylor	Winnipeg Centre	Conservative	1900	3rd term
John F. Mitchell	Winnipeg North	Conservative	1907	1st term
James Thomas Gordon	Winnipeg South	Conservative	1901	3rd term
Thomas Herman Johnson	Winnipeg West	Liberal	1907	1st term

== By-elections ==
By-elections were held to replace members for various reasons:

Electoral district	Member elected	Affiliation	Election date	Reason
Beautiful Plains	James H. Howden	Conservative	March 26, 1907	J H Howden appointed Railway Commissioner
Brandon City	Stanley McInnis	Conservative	July 16, 1907	S McInnis appointed Provincial Secretary
Brandon City	George R. Coldwell	Conservative	November 25, 1907	S McInnis died November 4, 1907
Gilbert Plains	Duncan Cameron	Conservative	November 17, 1908	G Campbell ran for federal seat
Portage la Prairie	Hugh Armstrong	Conservative	November 30, 1908	H Armstrong appointed Provincial Treasurer
Virden	Harvey Simpson	Conservative	January 9, 1909	J H Agnew died November 9, 1908
Birtle	George Malcolm	Liberal	November 27, 1909	C Mickle named judge in 1909
