= 11th Manitoba Legislature =

The members of the 11th Manitoba Legislature were elected in the Manitoba general election held in July 1903. The legislature sat from January 7, 1904, to February 28, 1907.

The Conservatives led by Rodmond Roblin formed the government.

Thomas Greenway of the Liberal Party served as Leader of the Opposition. After Greenway entered federal politics in November 1904, Charles Mickle became opposition leader.

James Johnson served as speaker for the assembly.

There were four sessions of the 11th Legislature:

Session	Start	End
1st	January 7, 1904	February 8, 1904
2nd	December 6, 1904	January 31, 1905
3rd	January 11, 1906	March 16, 1906
4th	January 3, 1907	February 13, 1907

Daniel Hunter McMillan was Lieutenant Governor of Manitoba.

== Members of the Assembly ==
The following members were elected to the assembly in 1903:

Member	Electoral district	Party	First elected / previously elected	No.# of term(s)
Allen Thompson	Arthur	Conservative	1899	2nd term
Joseph Prefontaine	Assiniboia	Liberal	1903	1st term
James Argue	Avondale	Conservative	1899	2nd term
John Andrew Davidson	Beautiful Plains	Conservative	1881, (Note: Dauphin) 1892, 1900	5th term*
James Howden (1903)	Beautiful Plains	Conservative	1903	1st term
Charles Mickle	Birtle	Liberal	1888	4th term
Stanley McInnis	Brandon City	Conservative	1899	2nd term
Alfred Carroll	Brandon South	Conservative	1903	1st term
Albert Prefontaine	Carillon	Conservative	1903	1st term
George Steel	Cypress	Liberal-Conservative	1899	2nd term
John Gunne	Dauphin	Conservative	1903	1st term
Edward Briggs	Deloraine	Conservative	1903	1st term
Rodmond Roblin	Dufferin	Conservative	1888, (Note: Dufferin North) 1896	5th term*
David Henry McFadden	Emerson	Conservative	1892	4th term
Glenlyon Campbell	Gilbert Plains	Conservative	1903	1st term
Baldwin Baldwinson	Gimli	Conservative	1899	2nd term
David Wilson	Gladstone	Conservative	1903	1st term
David Jackson	Hamiota	Liberal	1903	1st term
Martin O'Donohoe	Kildonan and St. Andrews	Liberal	1903	1st term
George Lawrence	Killarney	Conservative	1899	2nd term
Edwin D. Lynch	Lakeside	Conservative	1903	1st term
Harvey Hicks	Lansdowne	Conservative	1903	1st term
William Lagimodière	La Verendrye	Liberal	1888, 1899	3rd term*
Robert Rogers	Manitou	Conservative	1899	2nd term
William B. Waddell	Minnedosa	Conservative	1903	1st term
John Ruddell	Morden	Conservative	1899	2nd term
George Ashdown (1906)	Morden	Conservative	1906	1st term
Colin Campbell	Morris	Conservative	1899	2nd term
Thomas Greenway	Mountain	Liberal	1879	8th term
Daniel A. McIntyre (1905)	Mountain	Conservative	1905	1st term
Robert Fern Lyons	Norfolk	Conservative	1892, 1899	3rd term*
Hugh Armstrong	Portage la Prairie	Conservative	1892, (Note: Woodlands) 1902	3rd term*
Valentine Winkler	Rhineland	Liberal	1892	4th term
Isaac Riley	Rockwood	Conservative	1899	2nd term
William Doig	Russell	Liberal	1903	1st term
Horace Chevrier	St. Boniface	Liberal	1903	1st term
William Henry Corbett	Springfield	Conservative	1903	1st term
James Wells Robson	Swan River	Conservative	1903	1st term
James Johnson	Turtle Mountain	Independent Conservative	1897	3rd term
John Hume Agnew	Virden	Conservative	1903	1st term
Thomas William Taylor	Winnipeg Centre	Conservative	1900	2nd term
Sampson Walker	Winnipeg North	Conservative	1903	1st term
James Thomas Gordon	Winnipeg South	Conservative	1901	2nd term

== By-elections ==
By-elections were held to replace members for various reasons:

Electoral district	Member elected	Affiliation	Election date	Reason
Beautiful Plains	James Howden	Conservative	December 2, 1903	JA Davidson died November 14, 1903
Virden	John Hume Agnew	Conservative	March 12, 1904	JH Agnew ran for reelection upon appointment as Provincial Treasurer
Mountain	Daniel A. McIntyre	Conservative	April 27, 1905	T Greenway ran for federal seat
Morden	George Ashdown	Conservative	May 18, 1906	J Ruddell died April 17, 1906
