= 10th Manitoba Legislature =

The members of the 10th Manitoba Legislature were elected in the Manitoba general election held in December 1899. The legislature sat from March 29, 1900, to June 25, 1903.

The Conservatives led by Hugh John Macdonald formed the government. After Macdonald resigned in 1900 to run for a federal seat, Rodmond Roblin became party leader and premier.

Thomas Greenway of the Liberal Party was Leader of the Opposition.

William Hespeler served as speaker for the assembly.

There were four sessions of the 10th Legislature:

Session	Start	End
1st	March 29, 1900	July 5, 1900
2nd	February 21, 1901	March 29, 1901
3rd	January 9, 1902	March 1, 1902
4th	February 12, 1903	March 18, 1903

James Colebrooke Patterson was Lieutenant Governor of Manitoba until October 10, 1900, when Daniel Hunter McMillan became lieutenant governor.

== Members of the Assembly ==
The following members were elected to the assembly in 1899:

Member	Electoral district	Party	First elected / previously elected	No.# of term(s)
James Argue	Avondale	Conservative	1899	1st term
Robert C. Ennis	Beautiful Plains	Liberal	1899	1st term
John Andrew Davidson (1900)	Beautiful Plains	Conservative	1881, (Note: Dauphin) 1892, 1900	4th term*
Charles Mickle	Birtle	Liberal	1888	4th term
Stanley McInnis	Brandon City	Conservative	1899	1st term
Thomas Greenwood	Brandon North	Liberal-Conservative	1899	1st term
Frank Oliver Fowler	Brandon South	Liberal	1897	2nd term
Martin Jérôme	Carillon	Liberal	1888, 1899	3rd term*
George Steel	Cypress	Liberal-Conservative	1899	1st term
Theodore Burrows	Dauphin	Liberal	1892	3rd term
Charles Alexander Young	Deloraine	Liberal	1896	2nd term
David Henry McFadden	Emerson	Conservative	1892	3rd term
Baldwin Baldwinson	Gimli	Conservative	1899	1st term
Orton Grain	Kildonan and St. Andrews	Liberal-Conservative	1899	1st term
George Lawrence	Killarney	Conservative	1899	1st term
James McKenzie	Lakeside	Liberal	1896	2nd term
Tobias Norris	Lansdowne	Liberal	1896	2nd term
William Lagimodière	La Verendrye	Liberal	1888, 1899	2nd term*
James Riddell	Lorne	Liberal	1896	2nd term
Robert Rogers	Manitou	Conservative	1899	1st term
Robert Myers	Minnedosa	Liberal	1892	3rd term
John Ruddell	Morden	Conservative	1899	1st term
Colin Campbell	Morris	Conservative	1899	1st term
Thomas Greenway	Mountain	Liberal	1879	7th term
Robert Fern Lyons	Norfolk	Conservative	1892, 1899	2nd term*
William Garland	Portage la Prairie	Conservative	1899	1st term
Hugh Armstrong (1902)	Portage la Prairie	Conservative	1892, (Note: Woodlands) 1902	2nd term*
Valentine Winkler	Rhineland	Liberal	1892	3rd term
Isaac Riley	Rockwood	Conservative	1899	1st term
William Hespeler	Rosenfeldt	Independent Conservative	1899	1st term
Henry Mullins	Russell	Conservative	1899	1st term
S.A.D. Bertrand	St. Boniface	Liberal	1899	1st term
Joseph Bernier (1900)	St. Boniface	Conservative	1900	1st term
William Ferguson	Saskatchewan	Conservative	1899	1st term
Allen Thompson	Souris	Conservative	1899	1st term
Thomas Henry Smith	Springfield	Liberal	1888	4th term
James Johnson	Turtle Mountain	Independent Conservative	1897	2nd term
James Simpson	Virden	Conservative	1899	1st term
Thomas Lewis Morton	Westbourne	Liberal	1888	4th term
Daniel Hunter McMillan	Winnipeg Centre	Liberal	1880, 1888	5th term*
Thomas William Taylor (1900)	Winnipeg Centre	Conservative	1900	1st term
William Neilson	Winnipeg North	Conservative	1899	1st term
Hugh John Macdonald	Winnipeg South	Conservative	1899	1st term
James Thomas Gordon (1901)	Winnipeg South	Conservative	1901	1st term
Rodmond Roblin	Woodlands	Conservative	1888, (Note: Dufferin North) 1896	4th term*

== By-elections ==
By-elections were held to replace members for various reasons:

Electoral district	Member elected	Affiliation	Election date	Reason
Emerson	David Henry McFadden	Conservative	January 30, 1900	D. H. McFadden ran for reelection upon appointment as Provincial Secretary and Minister of Public Works
Winnipeg South	Hugh John Macdonald	Conservative	January 30, 1900	HJ Macdonald ran for reelection upon becoming Premier
Beautiful Plains	John Andrew Davidson	Conservative	March 10, 1900	RC Ennis resigned seat
Morris	Colin H. Campbell	Conservative	October 29, 1900	C. H. Campbell ran for reelection upon appointment as Attorney-General
Winnipeg Centre	Thomas William Taylor	Conservative	November 1, 1900	DH McMillan named lieutenant-governor for Manitoba
Woodlands	Rodmond Roblin	Conservative	November 8, 1900	R Roblin ran for reelection upon appointment as Premier
Rhineland	Valentine Winkler	Liberal	November 19, 1900	V Minkler ran for federal seat
St. Boniface	Joseph Bernier	Conservative	November 24, 1900	SAD Bertrand ran for federal seat
Manitou	Robert Rogers	Conservative	December 31, 1900	R Rogers ran for reelection upon appointment as Minister of Public Works
Winnipeg South	James Thomas Gordon	Conservative	January 24, 1901	HJ Macdonald ran for federal seat
Portage la Prairie	Hugh Armstrong	Conservative	February 6, 1902	W Garland died November 11, 1901
