= Manitoba Legislature =

Legislature of Manitoba, Canada

Manitoba Legislature Législature du Manitoba
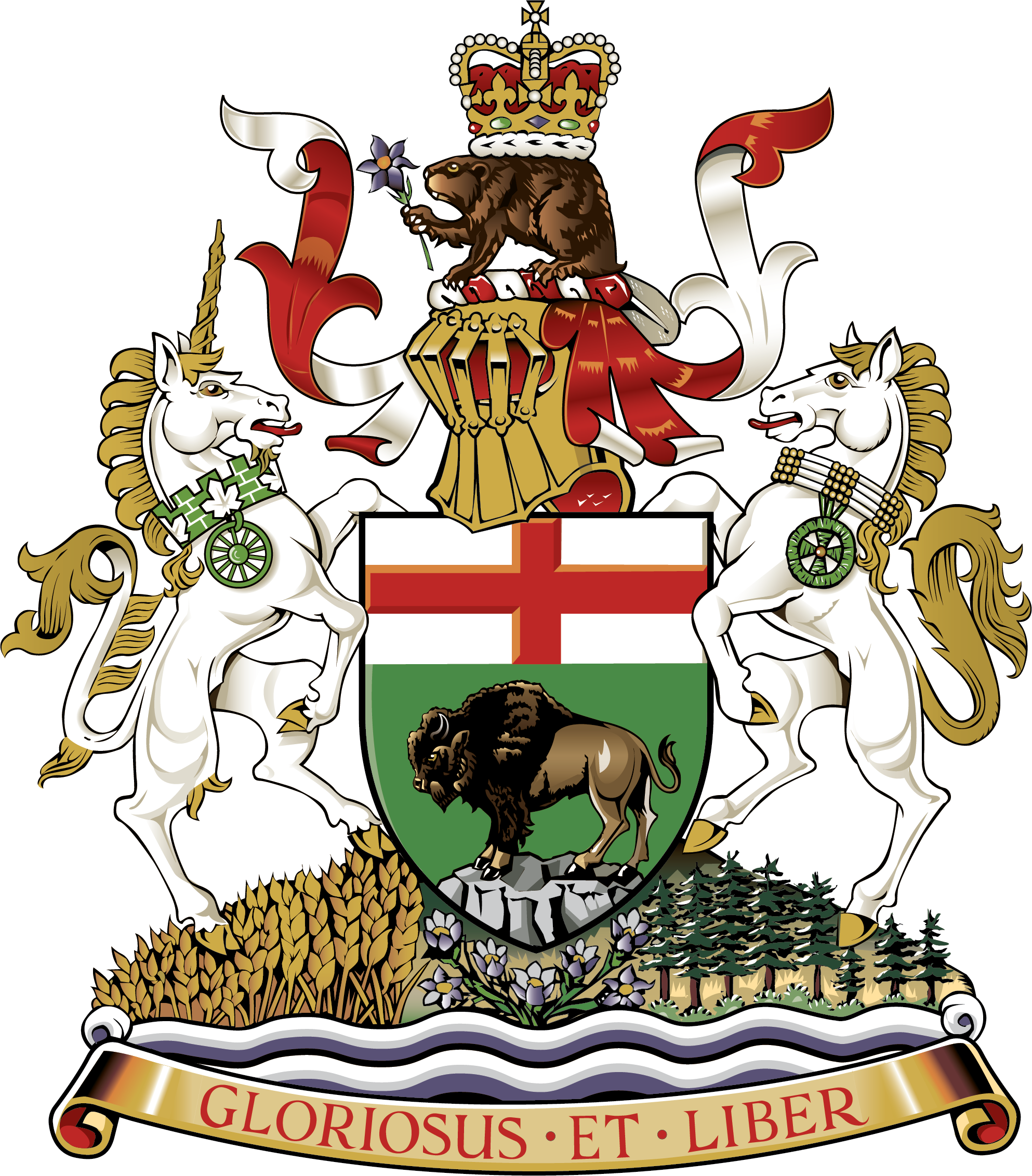
- Manitoba coat of arms

Type
- Type: Bicameral (1870–1876); Unicameral (1876–present)
- Houses: Legislative Council (until 1876); Legislative Assembly
- Sovereign: The lieutenant governor (representing the King of Canada)

History
- Founded: 1870

Meeting place
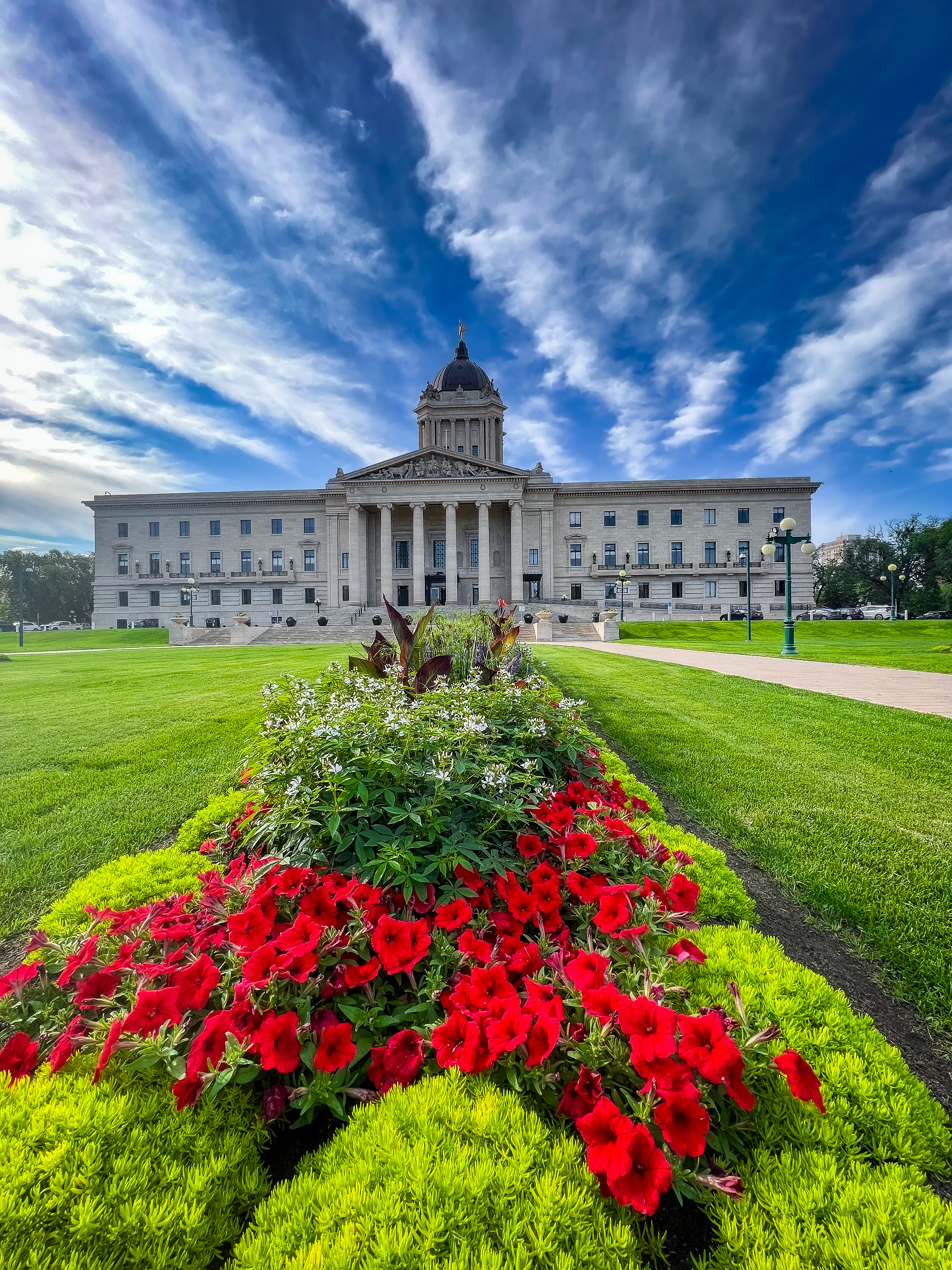
- Manitoba Legislative Building

The Manitoba Legislature is the legislature of the province of Manitoba, Canada. Today, the legislature is made of two elements: the lieutenant governor (representing the King of Canada) and the unicameral assembly called the Legislative Assembly of Manitoba. The legislature has existed since Manitoba was formed out of part of Rupert's Land in 1870.

Like the Canadian federal government, Manitoba uses a Westminster-style parliamentary government, in which members are sent to the Legislative Assembly after general elections and from there the party with the most seats chooses a Premier of Manitoba and Executive Council of Manitoba. The premier is Manitoba's head of government, while the King of Canada is its head of state.

An upper house, the Legislative Council of Manitoba, was established in 1870 but was abolished in 1876 as a cost-cutting measure and as a condition for federal funding.

Before 1879, candidates in Manitoba elections were not affiliated with political parties. However, some candidates declared their support for (or opposition to) the administration of the time.

== List of legislatures ==
Following is a list of all the legislatures convened since 1870.

Assembly Sessions	Election	From To (Note: From opening day of legislature to the day that the legislature was dissolved.)	Governing Party	Premier	Official Opposition Party Leader	Speaker of the House
1st Legislature 4 sessions	1st general	March 15, 1871; December 16, 1874	none (Note: Political parties did not exist in the Manitoba legislature before 1879)	Alfred Boyd (Note: Acted as provincial secretary; Lieutenant Governor Archibald performed the functions of Premier) (Note: Until December 14, 1871) Marc-Amable Girard (Note: Until March 14, 1872); Henry Joseph Clarke (Note: Until July 8, 1874); Marc-Amable Girard	none (Note: Did not exist until 1880)	Joseph Royal (Note: Until 1872) Curtis James Bird
2nd Legislature 4 sessions	2nd general	March 31, 1875; November 11, 1878	none	Robert Atkinson Davis	none	Joseph Dubuc
3rd Legislature 1 session	3rd general	February 1, 1879; November 26, 1879	none	John Norquay	none	John Wright Sifton
4th Legislature 4 sessions	4th general	January 22, 1880; November 13, 1882	Conservative	John Norquay	Thomas Greenway	John Wright Sifton
5th Legislature 4 sessions	5th general	May 17, 1883; November 11, 1886	Conservative	John Norquay	Liberal Thomas Greenway	Alexander Murray
6th Legislature 2 sessions	6th general	April 14, 1887; June 16, 1888	Conservative (Note: Until January 19, 1888) Liberal	John Norquay (Note: Until December 24, 1887) David Howard Harrison; Thomas Greenway	Liberal Thomas Greenway	David Glass
7th Legislature 5 sessions	7th general	August 28, 1888; June 27, 1892	Liberal	Thomas Greenway	Conservative John Norquay (Note: Until 1889); Rodmond Roblin	William Winram (Note: Until February 1891) Samuel Jacob Jackson
8th Legislature 3 sessions	8th general	February 2, 1893; December 11, 1895	Liberal	Thomas Greenway	Conservative William Alexander Macdonald (Note: Until 1894); John Andrew Davidson (Note: Until 1895)	Samuel Jacob Jackson (Note: Until February 1891) Finlay McNaughton Young
9th Legislature 4 sessions	9th general	February 6, 1896; November 16, 1899	Liberal	Thomas Greenway	Conservative Rodmond Roblin	Finlay McNaughton Young
10th Legislature 4 sessions	10th general	March 29, 1900; June 25, 1903	Conservative	Hugh John Macdonald (Note: Until October 29, 1900) Rodmond Roblin	Liberal Thomas Greenway	William Hespeler
11th Legislature 4 sessions	11th general	January 7, 1904; February 28, 1907	Conservative	Rodmond Roblin	Liberal Thomas Greenway (Note: Until November 1904); Charles Mickle	James Johnson
12th Legislature 3 sessions	12th general	January 2, 1908; June 30, 1910	Conservative	Rodmond Roblin	Liberal Charles Mickle (Note: Until 1909); Tobias Norris	James Johnson
13th Legislature 4 sessions	13th general	February 9, 1911; June 15, 1914	Conservative	Rodmond Roblin	Liberal Tobias Norris	James Johnson
14th Legislature 2 sessions	14th general	September 15, 1914; July 16, 1915	Conservative	Rodmond Roblin	Liberal Tobias Norris	James Johnson
15th Legislature 5 sessions	15th general	January 6, 1916; March 27, 1920	Liberal	Tobias Norris	Conservative Albert Prefontaine	James Bryson Baird
16th Legislature 2 sessions	16th general	February 10, 1921; June 24, 1922	Liberal	Tobias Norris	Conservative John Thomas Haig	James Bryson Baird
17th Legislature 6 sessions	17th general	January 18, 1923; June 4, 1927	United Farmers of Manitoba	John Bracken	Liberal Tobias Norris	Philippe Adjutor Talbot
18th Legislature 5 sessions	18th general	December 1, 1927; May 7, 1932	United Farmers of Manitoba	John Bracken	Conservative Fawcett Taylor	Philippe Adjutor Talbot
19th Legislature 4 sessions	19th general	February 14, 1933; June 12, 1936	Progressive Party of Manitoba Liberal (Note: Coalition government)	John Bracken	Conservative Fawcett Taylor (Note: Until 1933); William Sanford Evans	Philippe Adjutor Talbot
20th Legislature 5 sessions	20th general	February 18, 1937; March 12, 1941	Liberal-Progressive	John Bracken	Conservative Errick Willis	Robert Hawkins
21st Legislature 5 sessions	21st general	December 9, 1941; September 8, 1945	Coalition government	John Bracken (Note: Until 1943) Stuart Garson	Co-operative Commonwealth Federation (Note: From 1943) Seymour Farmer	Robert Hawkins
22nd Legislature 4 sessions	22nd general	February 19, 1946; September 29, 1949	Coalition government	Stuart Garson (Note: Until 1948) Douglas Lloyd Campbell	Co-operative Commonwealth Federation Seymour Farmer (Note: Until 1947); Edwin Hansford	Robert Hawkins
23rd Legislature 7 sessions	23rd general	February 14, 1950; April 23, 1953	Liberal-Progressive	Douglas Lloyd Campbell	Progressive Conservative Errick Willis	Wallace C. Miller (Note: Until August 1950) Nicholas Bachynsky
24th Legislature 4 sessions	24th general	February 2, 1954; April 30, 1958	Liberal-Progressive	Douglas Lloyd Campbell	Progressive Conservative Errick Willis (Note: Until June 1954); Duff Roblin	Nicholas Bachynsky
25th Legislature 2 sessions	25th general	October 23, 1958; March 31, 1959	Progressive Conservative	Duff Roblin	Liberal-Progressive Douglas Lloyd Campbell	Abram Harrison
26th Legislature 5 sessions	26th general	June 9, 1959; November 9, 1962	Progressive Conservative	Duff Roblin	Liberal-Progressive (Note: In 1961, renamed the Manitoba Liberal Party) Douglas Lloyd Campbell (Note: Until 1961); Gildas Molgat	Abram Harrison
27th Legislature 5 sessions	27th general	February 28, 1963; May 18, 1966	Progressive Conservative	Duff Roblin	Liberal Gildas Molgat	James Bilton
28th Legislature 3 sessions	28th general	December 5, 1966; May 22, 1969	Progressive Conservative	Duff Roblin (Note: Until 1967) Walter Weir	Liberal Gildas Molgat	James Bilton
29th Legislature 5 sessions	29th general	August 14, 1969; May 25, 1973	New Democratic Party	Edward Schreyer	Progressive Conservative Walter Weir (Note: Until 1971); Sidney Spivak	Ben Hanuschak (Note: Until August 1970) Peter Fox
30th Legislature 4 sessions	30th general	January 31, 1974; September 6, 1977	New Democratic Party	Edward Schreyer	Progressive Conservative Sidney Spivak (Note: Until 1976); Donald Craik (Note: Acting leader until November 1976); Sterling Lyon	Peter Fox
31st Legislature 5 sessions	31st general	November 24, 1977; October 13, 1981	Progressive Conservative	Sterling Lyon	New Democratic Party Edward Schreyer (Note: Until 1979); Howard Pawley	Harry Graham
32nd Legislature 4 sessions	32nd general	February 25, 1982; February 11, 1986	New Democratic Party	Howard Pawley	Progressive Conservative Sterling Lyon (Note: Until 1983); Gary Filmon	Jim Walding
33rd Legislature 4 sessions	33rd general	May 8, 1986; March 9, 1988	New Democratic Party	Howard Pawley	Progressive Conservative Gary Filmon	Myrna Phillips
34th Legislature 4 sessions	34th general	July 21, 1988; August 7, 1990	Progressive Conservative	Gary Filmon	Liberal Sharon Carstairs	Denis Rocan
35th Legislature 6 sessions	35th general	October 11, 1990; March 21, 1995	Progressive Conservative	Gary Filmon	New Democratic Party Gary Doer	Denis Rocan
36th Legislature 5 sessions	36th general	May 23, 1995; August 17, 1999	Progressive Conservative	Gary Filmon	New Democratic Party Gary Doer	Louise Dacquay
37th Legislature 4 sessions	37th general	November 18, 1999; May 2, 2003	New Democratic Party	Gary Doer	Progressive Conservative Gary Filmon (Note: Until 2000); Bonnie Mitchelson (Note: Acting until November 2000); Stuart Murray	George Hickes
38th Legislature 5 sessions	38th general	June 23, 2003; April 20, 2007	New Democratic Party	Gary Doer	Progressive Conservative Stuart Murray (Note: Until April 2006); Hugh McFadyen	George Hickes
39th Legislature 5 sessions	39th general	June 6, 2007; September 6, 2011	New Democratic Party	Gary Doer (Note: Until October 2009) Greg Selinger	Progressive Conservative Hugh McFadyen	George Hickes
40th Legislature 3 sessions	40th general	October 20, 2011; March 16, 2016	New Democratic Party	Greg Selinger	Progressive Conservative Hugh McFadyen (Note: Until July 2012); Brian Pallister	Daryl Reid
41st Legislature 4 sessions	41st general	March 16, 2016; August 12, 2019	Progressive Conservative	Brian Pallister	New Democratic Party Flor Marcelino (Note: Until September 2017); Wab Kinew Liberal Dougald Lamont	Myrna Driedger
42nd Legislature 5 sessions	42nd general	August 12, 2019; September 5, 2023	Progressive Conservative	Brian Pallister (Note: Until September 2021) Kelvin Goertzen (Note: Until November 2021); Heather Stefanson	New Democratic Party Wab Kinew	Myrna Driedger
43rd Legislature 1 session	43rd general	October 18, 2023 present	New Democratic Party	Wab Kinew	Progressive Conservative Heather Stefanson (Note: Until January 2024) Wayne Ewasko	Tom Lindsey
