= 9th Manitoba Legislature =

The members of the 9th Manitoba Legislature were elected in the Manitoba general election held in January 1896. The legislature sat from February 6, 1896, to November 16, 1899.

The Liberals led by Thomas Greenway formed the government.

Rodmond Roblin served as Leader of the Opposition.

Finlay McNaughton Young served as speaker for the assembly.

There were four sessions of the 9th Legislature:

Session	Start	End
1st	February 6, 1896	April 16, 1896
2nd	February 11, 1897	April 16, 1897
3rd	March 10, 1898	April 27, 1898
4th	March 16, 1899	July 21, 1899

James Colebrooke Patterson was Lieutenant Governor of Manitoba.

== Members of the Assembly ==
The following members were elected to the assembly in 1896:

Member	Electoral district	Party	First elected / previously elected	No.# of term(s)
Thomas Dickie	Avondale	Liberal	1896	1st term
William Sirett	Beautiful Plains	Patrons of Industry	1896	1st term
Charles Mickle	Birtle	Liberal	1888	3rd term
Charles Adams	Brandon City	Liberal	1893	2nd term
Clifford Sifton	Brandon North	Liberal	1888	3rd term
Alexander Cumming Fraser (1896)	Brandon North	Liberal	1896	1st term
Herbert Graham	Brandon South	Liberal	1888	3rd term
Frank Oliver Fowler (1897)	Brandon South	Liberal	1897	1st term
Roger Marion	Carillon	Conservative	1886, 1896	3rd term*
Alfred Doig	Cypress	Liberal	1892	2nd term
Theodore Burrows	Dauphin	Liberal	1892	2nd term
Charles Alexander Young	Deloraine	Liberal	1896	1st term
Watson Crosby	Dennis	Patrons of Industry	1896	1st term
William James Kennedy (1897)	Dennis	Liberal	1897	1st term
David Henry McFadden	Emerson	Conservative	1892	2nd term
Hector Sutherland	Kildonan	Conservative	1896	1st term
Finlay Young	Killarney	Liberal	1883	5th term
John Rutherford	Lakeside	Liberal	1892	2nd term
James McKenzie (1896)	Lakeside	Liberal	1896	1st term
Tobias Norris	Lansdowne	Liberal	1896	1st term
Théophile Paré	La Verendrye	Conservative	1892	2nd term
James Riddell	Lorne	Liberal	1896	1st term
John Donald McIntosh	Manitou	Liberal	1896	1st term
Robert Myers	Minnedosa	Liberal	1892	2nd term
Thomas Duncan	Morden	Liberal	1892	2nd term
Stewart Mulvey	Morris	Liberal	1896	1st term
Thomas Greenway	Mountain	Liberal	1879	6th term
George Rogers	Norfolk	Liberal	1896	1st term
Robert Watson	Portage la Prairie	Liberal	1892	2nd term
Valentine Winkler	Rhineland	Liberal	1892	2nd term
Samuel Jacob Jackson	Rockwood	Liberal	1883	5th term
Enoch Winkler	Rosenfeldt	Liberal	1888	3rd term
James Fisher	Russell	Independent	1888	3rd term
Sigtryggur Jonasson	St. Andrews	Liberal	1896	1st term
James Prendergast	St. Boniface	Liberal	1885 (Note: First elected as a Conservative)	5th term
David McNaught	Saskatchewan	Liberal	1892	2nd term
Archibald McIntyre Campbell	Souris	Liberal	1888	3rd term
Thomas Henry Smith	Springfield	Liberal	1888	3rd term
John Hettle	Turtle Mountain	Liberal	1888	3rd term
James Johnson (1897)	Turtle Mountain	Independent Conservative	1897	1st term
Thomas Lewis Morton	Westbourne	Liberal	1888	3rd term
Daniel Hunter McMillan	Winnipeg Centre	Liberal	1880, 1888	4th term*
Peter McIntyre	Winnipeg North	Liberal	1892	2nd term
John Donald Cameron	Winnipeg South	Liberal	1892	2nd term
Rodmond Roblin	Woodlands	Conservative	1888, (Note: Dufferin North) 1896	3rd term*

== By-elections ==
By-elections were held to replace members for various reasons:

Electoral district	Member elected	Affiliation	Election date	Reason
Lakeside	James McKenzie	Liberal	November 19, 1896	J Rutherford ran for federal seat
Birtle	Charles Mickle	Liberal	December 19, 1896	C Mickle appointed Provincial Secretary
Brandon North	Alexander Cumming Fraser	Liberal	December 19, 1896	C Sifton named federal minister
St. Boniface	Jean-Baptiste Lauzon	Conservative	February 20, 1897	J Prendergast named county court judge
Dennis	William James Kennedy	Liberal	July 15, 1897	WM Crosby died March 19, 1897
Brandon South	Frank Oliver Fowler	Liberal	November 20, 1897	H Graham resigned seat
Turtle Mountain	James Johnson	Independent Conservative	November 27, 1897	J Hettle died September 20, 1897
