= 8th Manitoba Legislature =

The members of the 8th Manitoba Legislature was elected in the Manitoba general election held in July 1892. The legislature sat from February 2, 1893, to December 11, 1895.

The Liberals led by Thomas Greenway formed the government.

William A. Macdonald served as Leader of the Opposition in 1893. After Macdonald's election was overturned, John Andrew Davidson became opposition leader in 1894. Davidson was subsequently unseated and James Fisher served as de facto opposition leader during the period that followed.

Samuel Jacob Jackson was speaker for the assembly until January 1895. Finlay McNaughton Young succeeded Winram as speaker.

There were three sessions of the 8th Legislature:

| Session | Start | End |
|---|---|---|
| 1st | February 2, 1893 | March 11, 1893 |
| 2nd | January 11, 1894 | March 2, 1894 |
| 3rd | February 14, 1895 | June 28, 1895 |

John Christian Schultz was Lieutenant Governor of Manitoba.

== Members of the Assembly ==
The following members were elected to the assembly in 1892:

| Member | Electoral district | Party | First elected / previously elected | No.# of term(s) |
|---|---|---|---|---|
| James Hartney | Avondale | Conservative | 1892 | 1st term |
| John Davidson | Beautiful Plains | Conservative | 1881, (Note: Dauphin) 1892 | 3rd term* |
| John Forsyth (1894) | Beautiful Plains | Patrons of Industry | 1894 | 1st term |
| Charles Mickle | Birtle | Liberal | 1888 | 2nd term |
| William A. Macdonald | Brandon City | Conservative | 1892 | 1st term |
| Charles Adams (1893) | Brandon City | Liberal | 1893 | 1st term |
| Clifford Sifton | Brandon North | Liberal | 1888 | 2nd term |
| Herbert Graham | Brandon South | Liberal | 1888 | 2nd term |
| Martin Jérôme | Carillon | Independent Liberal | 1888 | 2nd term |
| Alfred Doig | Cypress | Liberal | 1892 | 1st term |
| Theodore Burrows | Dauphin | Conservative; Government supporter | 1892 | 1st term |
| Thomas Henry Kellett | Deloraine | Conservative | 1892 | 1st term |
| James Frame | Dennis | Conservative | 1892 | 1st term |
| David Henry McFadden | Emerson | Conservative | 1892 | 1st term |
| J. Bird | Kildonan | Liberal | 1892 | 1st term |
| Finlay Young | Killarney | Liberal | 1883 | 5th term |
| John Rutherford | Lakeside | Liberal | 1892 | 1st term |
| Edward Dickson | Lansdowne | Liberal | 1888 | 2nd term |
| Théophile Paré | La Verendrye | Conservative | 1892 | 1st term |
| Robert George O'Malley | Lorne | Conservative | 1888 | 2nd term |
| Robert Ironside | Manitou | Liberal | 1892 | 1st term |
| Robert Myers | Minnedosa | Liberal | 1892 | 1st term |
| Thomas Duncan | Morden | Liberal | 1892 | 1st term |
| Alphonse-Fortunat Martin | Morris | Liberal | 1874, (Note: Ste. Agathe) 1886 | 4th term* |
| Thomas Greenway | Mountain | Liberal | 1879 | 6th term |
| Robert Fern Lyons | Norfolk | Conservative | 1892 | 1st term |
| Robert Watson | Portage la Prairie | Liberal | 1892 | 1st term |
| Valentine Winkler | Rhineland | Liberal | 1892 | 1st term |
| Samuel Jacob Jackson | Rockwood | Liberal | 1883 | 5th term |
| Enoch Winkler | Rosenfeldt | Liberal | 1888 | 2nd term |
| James Fisher | Russell | Liberal | 1888 | 2nd term |
| Frederick Colcleugh | St. Andrews | Liberal | 1888 | 2nd term |
| James Prendergast | St. Boniface | Conservative; Government supporter | 1885 (Note: First elected as a Conservative) | 4th term |
| David McNaught | Saskatchewan | Liberal | 1892 | 1st term |
| Archibald McIntyre Campbell | Souris | Liberal | 1888 | 2nd term |
| Thomas Henry Smith | Springfield | Liberal | 1888 | 2nd term |
| John Hettle | Turtle Mountain | Liberal | 1888 | 2nd term |
| Thomas Lewis Morton | Westbourne | Independent Liberal | 1888 | 2nd term |
| Daniel Hunter McMillan | Winnipeg Centre | Liberal | 1880, 1888 | 3rd term* |
| Peter McIntyre | Winnipeg North | Liberal | 1892 | 1st term |
| John Donald Cameron | Winnipeg South | Liberal | 1892 | 1st term |
| Hugh Armstrong | Woodlands | Conservative | 1892 | 1st term |

== By-elections ==
By-elections were held to replace members for various reasons:

| Electoral district | Member elected | Affiliation | Election date | Reason |
|---|---|---|---|---|
| Winnipeg South | John Donald Cameron | Liberal | January 20, 1893 | JD Cameron appointed Provincial Secretary |
| Brandon City | Charles Adams | Liberal | September 8, 1893 | Results of 1892 election declared invalid |
| Brandon City | Charles Adams | Liberal | August 23, 1894 | Results of 1893 by-election declared invalid |
| Beautiful Plains | John Forsyth | Patrons of Industry | August 23, 1894 | Results of 1892 election declared invalid |
