= 1910 Manitoba general election =

- July 11, 1910

41 seats of the Legislative Assembly of Manitoba 21 seats needed for a majority
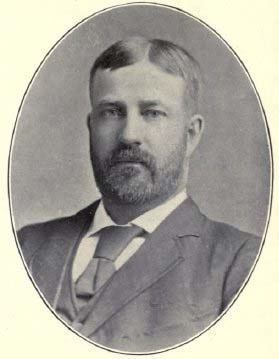

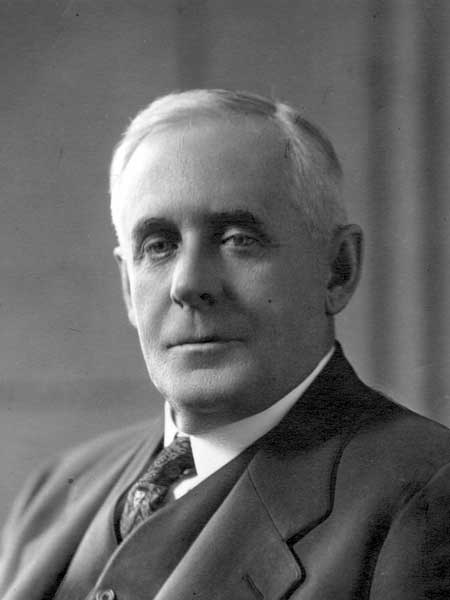
	First party	Second party
Leader	Rodmond Roblin	Tobias Norris
Party	Conservative	Liberal
Leader since	1900	1910
Leader's seat	Dufferin	Lansdowne
Last election	28	13
Seats won	28	13
Seat change	0	0
Popular vote	50.8%	44.2%
Swing	▲0.2pp	▼3.7pp
Premier before election
Rodmond Roblin
Conservative
Premier after election
Rodmond Roblin
Conservative

The 1910 Manitoba general election was held on July 11, 1910 to elect members of the Legislative Assembly of the Province of Manitoba, Canada.

The result was a fourth consecutive majority government for the Conservative Party of Manitoba, led by premier Rodmond Roblin. Roblin's electoral machine won 28 seats, against 13 for the opposition Manitoba Liberal Party under new leader Tobias Norris.

The Manitoba Labour Party ran a single candidate: Fred Dixon, who was almost elected in Winnipeg Centre with unofficial support from the Liberal Party. Many believe that Dixon was defeated by the Socialist Party's decision to field a candidate against him. The Socialists ran two other candidates in Winnipeg, and both were defeated.

All the members were elected through First-past-the-post voting in single member districts. This was the last election to be conducted that way in Manitoba for 48 years. The next 11 elections involved the election of some MLAs in multi-member districts.

== Results ==
Party	Party Leader	# of candidates	Seats			Popular Vote		
Party	Party Leader	# of candidates	1907	Elected	% Change	#	%	Change (pp)
Conservative	Rodmond Roblin	41	28	28	0	38,117	50.8	+0.2
Liberal	Tobias Norris	39	13	13	0	33,157	44.2	-3.7
Labour		1	0	0	0	1,934	2.6	+1.1
Socialist		3	N/A	0	N/A	1,237	1.6	N/A
Independent		2	0	0	0	614	0.8	-2.3
Total			41	41		75,059	100	

Popular vote
Conservative	50.8%
Liberal	44.2%
Others	5.0%

Seats summary
Conservative	68.29%
Liberal	31.71%

== Riding results ==
(incumbent) or boldface denotes incumbent.

Arthur:

- Amos Lyle (C) 777
- (incumbent)John Williams (L) 602

Assiniboia:

- (incumbent)Aime Benard (C) 924
- R.A. Bonnar (L[?]) 322
- John Colvin (Ind-L-Lab) 66

Avondale:

- (incumbent)James Argue (C) 708
- J. Madill (L) 626

Beautiful Plains:

- (incumbent)James H. Howden (C) accl.

Birtle:

- (incumbent)George Malcolm (L) 758
- E. Graham (C) 648

Brandon City:

- (incumbent)George Coldwell (C) 1402
- S.H. McKay (L) 1150

Carillon:

- (incumbent)Albert Prefontaine (C) 619
- Horace Chevrier (L) 544

Cypress:

- (incumbent)George Steel (C) 875
- F.H. Mitchell (L) 699

Dauphin:

- James G. Harvey (C) 1107
- (incumbent)John A. Campbell (L) 1054

Deloraine:

- John C.W. Reid (C) 743
- (incumbent)Robert S. Thornton (L) 737

Dufferin:

- (incumbent)Rodmond Roblin (C) 1267
- W.F. Osborne (L) 811

Emerson:

- David McFadden (C) 766
- (incumbent)George Walton (L) 757

Gilbert Plains:

- Sam Hughes (C) 970
- W. Shaw (L) 865

Gimli:

- Baldwin Baldwinson (C) 900
- Wilhelm Paulson (L) 450
- X.J. Solmundson (Ind) 287

Gladstone:

- (incumbent)James W. Armstrong (L) 957
- W. McKelvey (C) 777

Hamiota:

- (incumbent)William Ferguson (C) 848
- E. Henry (L) 751

Kildonan and St. Andrews:

- (incumbent)Orton Grain (C) 1131
- A.R. Bredin (L) 1043

Killarney:

- (incumbent)George Lawrence (C) 726
- G. Robinson (L) 519

Lakeside:

- Charles Duncan McPherson (L) 570
- (incumbent)Edwin D. Lynch (C) 502

Lansdowne:

- (incumbent)Tobias Norris (L) 1196
- W. Fenwick (C) 944

La Veredrye:

- William Molloy (L) 439
- (incumbent)Jean-Baptiste Lauzon (C) 430

Manitou:

- (incumbent)Robert Rogers (C) 1065
- J.E. Gayton (L) 610

Minnedosa:

- John Thompson (L) 971
- (incumbent)William B. Waddell (C) 937

Morden:

- (incumbent)Benjamin McConnell (L) 630
- J.A. Hobbs (C) 586

Morris:

- (incumbent)Colin Campbell (C) 746
- R.L. Ross (L) 573

Mountain:

- (incumbent)James Bryson Baird (L) 1086
- E.L. Taylor (C) 804

Norfolk:

- (incumbent)Robert Lyons (C) 822
- Frank Avery (L) 647

Portage la Prairie:

- (incumbent)Hugh Armstrong (C) 912
- Ewan McPherson (L) 711

Rhineland:

- (incumbent)Valentine Winkler (L) 520
- Hugh McGavin (C) 387

Rockwood:

- (incumbent)Isaac Riley (C) 792
- Ira Stratton (L) 738

Russell:

- (incumbent)Angus Bonnycastle (C) 900
- W.V. Valens (L) 892

South Brandon:

- (incumbent)Alfred Carroll (C) 535
- E.H. Dewart (L) 525

Springfield:

- (incumbent)Donald A. Ross (L) 807
- C.P. Fullerton (C) 661

Swan River:

- Daniel D. McDonald (L) 465
- (incumbent)James W. Robson (C) 436

St. Boniface:

- (incumbent)Joseph Bernier (C) 1022
- A. Dubuc (L) 760

Turtle Mountain:

- (incumbent)James Johnson (C) 742
- W. Hanley (L) 580

Virden:

- (incumbent)Harvey Simpson (C) 985
- D. McDonald (L) 800

Winnipeg Centre:

Party	Candidate	Votes	%	±%
Conservative	(incumbent)Thomas Taylor	2,012	49.68%	
Labour	Fred Dixon	1,939	47.88%	
Socialist	W.S. Cummings	99	2.44%	
Total valid votes		4,050	100.00%	
Turnout			76.4%	

Winnipeg North:

- Solomon Hart Green (L) 2175
- (incumbent)John F. Mitchell (C) 1555
- Ed. Fulcher (SPC) 892

Winnipeg South:

- Lendrum McMeans (C) 2545
- Edward Brown (L) 2496

Winnipeg West:

- (incumbent)Thomas Herman Johnson (L) 2578
- A.J. Andrews (C) 2538
- George Armstrong (SPC) 246

== Post-election changes ==
Russell (res. Angus Bonnycastle, 1911), February 4, 1911:

- Frederic Newton (C) 916
- William Valens (L) 651

Killarney (George Lawrence appointed to cabinet, October 11, 1911), October 23, 1911:

- George Lawrence (C) accl.

Manitou (res. Robert Rogers, October 10, 1911), October 31, 1911:

- James Morrow (C) accl.

The Pas (new constituency), October 12, 1912:

- Robert Orok (C) accl.

Gimli (res. Baldwin Baldwinson, 1913), May 12, 1913:

- Edmund Taylor (C) 1674
- A. Eggerston (L) 832

St. Boniface (Joseph Bernier appointed to cabinet, 1913), May 22, 1913:

- Joseph Bernier (C) accl.

Kildonan and St. Andrews (res. Orton Grain, 1913), November 29, 1913:

- Walter Humphries Montague (C) 1123
- A.N. Bredin (L) 753
