= 1903 Manitoba general election =

- July 20, 1903

40 seats of the Legislative Assembly of Manitoba 21 seats needed for a majority
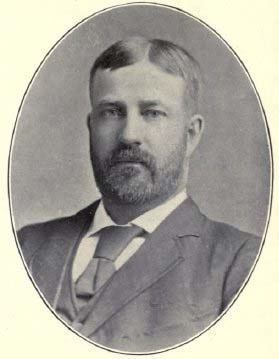

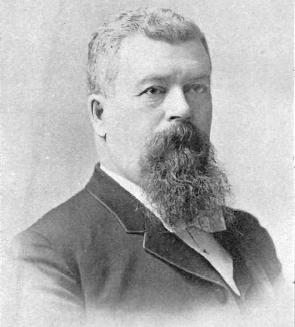
	First party	Second party
Leader	Rodmond Roblin	Thomas Greenway
Party	Conservative	Liberal
Leader since	1900	1882
Leader's seat	Dufferin	Mountain
Last election	23	17
Seats won	32	9 (Note: 8 Liberal seats and 1 Prohibition seat)
Seat change	▲9	▼8
Popular vote	50.6%	44.6%
Swing	▲0.8pp	▼4.9pp
Premier before election
Hugh John Macdonald
Conservative
Premier after election
Rodmond Roblin
Conservative

The 1903 Manitoba general election was held on July 20, 1903, to elect members of the Legislative Assembly of the Province of Manitoba, Canada.

The result was a second consecutive majority government for the Conservative Party of Manitoba, now led by Premier Rodmond Roblin. Roblin's electoral machine won a landslide thirty-two seats, while the opposition Manitoba Liberal Party under former premier Thomas Greenway won only eight. The Prohibition Party, most of whose candidates were also de facto Liberal candidates, having been endorsed by both parties, won one seat in the constituency of Hamiota. The Winnipeg Labour Party fielded candidates in three constituencies, but won none.

== Results ==
Party		Party Leader	# of candidates	Seats			Popular Vote		
Party		Party Leader	# of candidates	1899	Elected	% Change	#	%	Change (pp)
Conservative		Rodmond Roblin	40	23	31	+34.8%	26,929	50.6%	+0.8
Liberal (Note: In some constituencies, a Prohibition candidate was endorsed by both the Liberal Party and the Prohibition Party. In these constituencies, no Liberal candidate was fielded.)	Liberal	Thomas Greenway	30	17	8	-47.1%	18,056	33.9%	-4.9
Liberal	Prohibition	Thomas Greenway	9	N/A	1	-47.1%	5,684	10.7%	-4.9
Labour		Unknown	3	N/A	0	N/A	1,450	2.7%	N/A
Prohibition		Unknown	3	N/A	0	N/A	518	1.0%	N/A
Independents		N/A	3	0	0	N/A	595	1.1%	+0.4
Total			88	40	40		53,232	100%	

Popular vote
Conservative	50.6%
Liberal	44.6%
Others	4.8%

Seats
Conservative	77.5%
Liberal	22.5%

== Constituency Results ==
Arthur:

- (incumbent)Allen Thompson (C) 547
- John Williams (L) 499

Assiniboia:

- Joseph Prefontaine (L) 415
- Charles Caron (C) 398

Avondale:

- (incumbent)James Argue (C) 641
- Cornelius Miller (L) 435

Beautiful Plains:

- (incumbent)John Andrew Davidson (C) 838
- James McRae (L) 710

Birtle:

- (incumbent)Charles Mickle (L) 584
- John Leich (C) 293

Brandon City:

- (incumbent)Stanley McInnis (C) 765
- Alexander Fraser (L) 723

Carillon:

- Albert Prefontaine (C) 399
- Arthur Hebert (L) 308

Cypress:

- (incumbent)George Steel (LC) 855
- William Little (L) 756

Dauphin:

- John Gunne (C) 797
- John A. Campbell (L) 656

Deloraine:

- Edward Briggs (C) 457
- H.L. Montgomery (Proh) 437
- George Patterson (L) 429

Dufferin:

- (incumbent)Rodmond Roblin (C) 1150
- (incumbent)James Riddell (L) 731

Emerson:

- (incumbent)David H. McFadden (C) 436
- George Walton (L) 417
- W.R. Mulock (Proh) 77

Gilbert Plains:

- Glenlyon Campbell (C) 598
- Thomas Young (L) 396

Gimli:

- (incumbent)Baldwin Baldwinson (C) accl.

Gladstone:

- David Wilson (C) 829
- (incumbent)Thomas Morton (L) 693

Hamiota:

- David Jackson (L) 762
- (incumbent)William Ferguson (C) 740

Kildonan and St. Andrews:

- Martin O'Donohoe (L) 718
- (incumbent)Orton Grain (C) 713

Killarney:

- (incumbent)George Lawrence (C) 713
- Reuben Cross (Proh) 299
- G.B. Monteith (L) 282

Lakeside:

- Edwin Lynch (C) 537
- William Fulton (L) 469

Lansdowne:

- Harvey Hicks (C) 915
- (incumbent)Tobias Norris (L) 899

La Verendrye:

- (incumbent)William Lagimodiere (L) 348
- Jean Lauzon (C) 337

Manitou:

- (incumbent)Robert Rogers (C) 923
- Donald Campbell (L) 548

Minnedosa:

- William B. Waddell (C) 751
- Neil Cameron (L) 670

Morden:

- (incumbent)John Ruddell (C) 616
- G.H. Bradshaw (L) 528

Morris:

- (incumbent)Colin H. Campbell (C) 620
- Napoleon Comeault (L) 500

Mountain:

- (incumbent)Thomas Greenway (L) 911
- Daniel A. McIntyre (C) 567
- M. Wilson (Ind) 254

Norfolk:

- (incumbent)Robert Lyons (C) 941
- J.D. Hunt (L) 753

Portage la Prairie:

- (incumbent)Hugh Armstrong (C) 742
- Edward Brown (L) 711

Rhineland:

- (incumbent)Valentine Winkler (L) 355
- H.P. Hansen (C) 284
- Hermann Dirks (Ind) 148

Rockwood:

- (incumbent)Isaac Riley (C) 616
- Alexander Leonard (L) 516

Russell:

- W.J. Doig (L) 475
- Angus Bonnycastle (C) 351

St. Boniface:

- Horace Chevrier (L) 593
- (incumbent)Joseph Bernier (C) 592

South Brandon:

- Alfred Carroll (C) 508
- John Watson (L) 496

Springfield:

- William Henry Corbett (C) 353
- (incumbent)Thomas H. Smith (L) 245
- Donald Ross (Ind) 193

Swan River:

- James Wells Robson (C) 503
- A.J. Cotton (L) 272

Turtle Mountain:

- (incumbent)James Johnson (C) 741
- J.S. McEwan (L) 475
- J.F. Hunter (Proh) 142

Virden:

- John Agnew (C) 674
- F.W. Clinigan (L) 649

Winnipeg Centre:

- (incumbent)Thomas Taylor (C) 1276
- J.A. McArthur (L) 1123
- William Scott (Winnipeg Labor Party) 422

Winnipeg North:

- Sampson Walker (C) 1106
- J.W. Cockburn (L) 1057
- Robert Thoms (Winnipeg Labor Party) 591

Winnipeg South:

- (incumbent)James Gordon (C) 1807
- John D. Cameron (L) 1633
