= 1907 Manitoba general election =

Election

- March 7, 1907

41 seats of the Legislative Assembly of Manitoba 21 seats needed for a majority
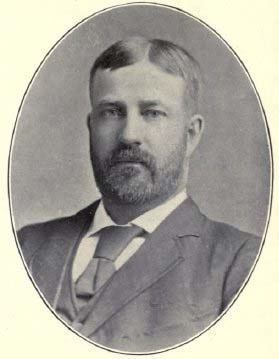

	First party	Second party
Leader	Rodmond Roblin	Edward Brown
Party	Conservative	Liberal
Leader since	1900	1906
Leader's seat	Dufferin	Ran in Portage la Prairie (lost)
Last election	32	8
Seats won	28	13
Seat change	▼4	▲5
Popular vote	50.6%	47.9%
Swing	▲3.0pp	▲3.3pp
Premier before election
Rodmond Roblin
Conservative
Premier after election
Rodmond Roblin
Conservative

The 1907 Manitoba general election was held on March 7, 1907 to elect members of the Legislative Assembly of the Province of Manitoba, Canada.

The result was a third consecutive majority government for the Conservative Party of Manitoba, led by premier Rodmond Roblin. Roblin's electoral machine won 28 seats, against 13 for the opposition Manitoba Liberal Party under new leader Edward Brown.

== Results ==
Party	Party Leader	# of candidates	Seats			Popular Vote		
Party	Party Leader	# of candidates	1903	Elected	% Change	#	%	Change (pp)
Conservative	Rodmond Roblin	41	32	28	-12.5	31,066	50.6	+3.0
Liberal	Edward Brown	39	8	13	+62.5	29,426	47.9	+3.3
Labour		1	0	0	-	939	1.5	-1.2
Total		81	40	41	-	61,431	100	-

Popular vote
Conservative	50.57%
Liberal	47.90%
Others	1.53%

Seats summary
Conservative	68.29%
Liberal	31.71%

== Constituency results ==
Arthur:

- John Williams (L) 536
- Amos Lyle (C) 533

Assiniboia:

- Aime Benard (C) 550
- (incumbent)Joseph H. Prefontaine (L) 311

Avondale:

- (incumbent)James Argue (C) 590
- W.H.B. Hill (L) 451

Beautiful Plains:

- (incumbent)James H. Howden (C) 791
- Alexander Dunlop (L) 679

Birtle:

- (incumbent)Charles Mickle (L) 617
- Thomas Thompson (C) 380

Brandon City:

- (incumbent)Stanley McInnis (C) 1210
- J.W. Fleming (L) 1081

Carillon:

- (incumbent)Albert Prefontaine (C) 423
- Mastai Gervais (L) 318

Cypress:

- (incumbent)George Steel (C) 783
- Adam Forbes (L) 672

Dauphin:

- John A. Campbell (L) 830
- James G. Harvey (C) 709

Deloraine:

- Robert Thornton (L) 602
- (incumbent)Edward Briggs (C) 561

Dufferin:

- (incumbent)Rodmond Roblin (C) 931
- Edward August (L) 760

Emerson:

- George Walton (L) 582
- (incumbent)David H. McFadden (C) 477

Gilbert Plains:

- (incumbent)Glenlyon Campbell (C) accl.

Gimli:

- Sigtryggur Jonasson (L) 621
- (incumbent)Baldwin Baldwinson (C) 465

Gladstone:

- James Armstrong (L) 743
- (incumbent)David Wilson (C) 682

Hamiota:

- William Ferguson (C) 737
- M.B. Jackson (L) 636

Kildonan and St. Andrews:

- Orton Grain (C) 792
- (incumbent)Martin O'Donohoe (L) 751

Killarney:

- (incumbent)George Lawrence (C) 642
- R.L. Richardson (L) 486

Lakeside:

- (incumbent)Edwin Lynch (C) 460
- Peter McArthur (L) 433

Lansdowne:

- Tobias Norris (L) 859
- (incumbent)Harvey E. Hicks (C) 763

La Verendrye:

- Jean Lauzon (C) 361
- (incumbent)William Lagimodiere (L) 338

Manitou:

- (incumbent)Robert Rogers (C) 832
- G.E. Davidson (L) 512

Minnedosa:

- (incumbent)William B. Waddell (C) 792
- E.W. Pearson (L) 626

Morden:

- Benjamin McConnell (L) 544
- (incumbent)George Ashdown (C) 454

Morris:

- (incumbent)Colin H. Campbell (C) 525
- John Molloy (L) 524

Mountain:

- James Baird (L) 1031
- (incumbent)Daniel A. McIntyre (C) 598

Norfolk:

- (incumbent)Robert Lyons (C) 799
- William Walker (L) 646

Portage la Prairie:

- (incumbent)Hugh Armstrong (C) 868
- Edward Brown (L) 645

Rhineland:

- (incumbent)Valentine Winkler (L) 364
- Cor. Bergman (C) 321

Rockwood:

- (incumbent)Isaac Riley (C) 676
- Ira Stratton (L) 620

Russell:

- Angus Bonnycastle (C) 605
- T.A. Wright (L) 596

St. Boniface:

- Joseph Bernier (C) 749
- (incumbent)Horace Chevrier (L) 688

South Brandon:

- (incumbent)Alfred Carroll (C) 418
- James Roddick (L) 409

Springfield:

- Donald Ross (L) 540
- John Little (C) 359

Swan River:

- (incumbent)James Robson (C) 387
- J.P. Jones (L) 348

Turtle Mountain:

- (incumbent)James Johnson (C) 649
- John Morrow (L) 462

Virden:

- (incumbent)John Agnew (C) 730
- John Rattray (L) 645

Winnipeg Centre:

- (incumbent)Thomas Taylor (C) 2314
- J.A MacArthur (L) 2047

Winnipeg North:

- John F. Mitchell (C) 2244
- Alex. MacDonald (L) 1874

Winnipeg South:

- (incumbent)James Gordon (C) 2122
- Benjamin Elswood Chaffey (L) 1988

Winnipeg West:

- Thomas Herman Johnson (L) 2011
- Thomas Sharpe (C) 1785
- Kempton McKim (ILP) 939

== Post-election changes ==
Beautiful Plains (James H. Howden appointed to cabinet, March 16, 1907), March 26, 1907:

- James H. Howden (C) accl.

Brandon City (Stanley McInnis appointed to cabinet, June 26, 1907), July 16, 1907:

- Stanley McInnis (C) accl.

Brandon City (dec. Stanley McInnis, November 4, 1907), November 25, 1907:

- George Coldwell (C) accl.

Gilbert Plains (res. Glenlyon Campbell, 1908), November 17, 1908:

- Duncan Cameron (C) 894
- A.D. Cummings (L) 855

Portage la Prairie (Hugh Armstrong to cabinet, November 19, 1908), November 30, 1908:

- Hugh Armstrong (C) accl.

Virden (dec. John Agnew, November 9, 1908), January 9, 1909:

- Harvey Simpson (C) +206
- Robert Forke (L)

Birtle (res. Charles Mickle, 1909), November 27, 1909:

- George Malcolm (L/Grain Grower's) elected
