= Richard Bonnycastle =

Richard Bonnycastle may refer to:

- Richard Henry Bonnycastle (1791–1847), officer of the British army active in Upper Canada
- Richard H. G. Bonnycastle (1903–1968), Canadian lawyer, fur trader, adventurer and businessman
- Richard A. N. Bonnycastle (1934–2023), Canadian businessman

== See also ==
- Bonnycastle family
