= Hartney (surname) =

Hartney is a surname. Notable people with the surname include:

- Brendan Hartney (born 1958), Australian rules footballer
- Harold Evans Hartney (1888–1947), Canadian-born American World War I flying ace
- Harold Hartney (footballer) (1909–1963), Australian rules footballer
- James Hartney (1848–1924), Canadian politician
- Jordan Hartney (born 1988), Canadian swimmer
- Seán Hartney (1902–1974), Irish politician
