= Thomas Lusted =

Canadian politician

Thomas Lusted (May 23, 1841 – March 12, 1904) was an English-born baker and political figure in Manitoba. He represented Rockwood in 1878 in the Legislative Assembly of Manitoba.

He was born in Kent. In 1863, he married Hester Emma Hadskis. Lusted came to the Red River Colony in 1867. He was first active as a carriage maker but later became Manitoba's first baker. Lusted was active in the Canadian Party and was arrested by Louis Riel's forces in December 1869. He was put in prison at Upper Fort Garry and was released in February 1870. Lusted was then forced to leave the country but returned later that year.

He was defeated by John Aikins when he ran for reelection in 1879. Lusted later served as registrar of deeds for Rockwood.

He died at home near Stonewall at the age of 62. Lusted Street in Winnipeg is named for him.
