= Edward Briggs =

Edward Briggs may refer to:

- Edward Briggs (politician) (1854–1941), farmer and political figure in Manitoba
- Edward S. Briggs (1926–2022), vice admiral in the U.S. Navy

== See also ==
- Ted Briggs (Albert Edward Pryke Briggs, 1923–2008), British seaman and last survivor of the destruction of the battlecruiser HMS Hood
