= Bonnycastle =

Bonnycastle may refer to:

- Bonnycastle, Louisville, a neighborhood near downtown Louisville, Kentucky
- Bonnycastle family of Canada
