= William Ferguson (Manitoba politician) =

Canadian politician

William Ferguson (March 8, 1862 – October 29, 1936) was a politician in Manitoba, Canada. He served in the Legislative Assembly of Manitoba from 1899 to 1903 and 1907–1914, as a member of the Conservative Party.

Ferguson was born in Canada West and came to Manitoba in 1882. He was a farmer and lived in Hamiota during his political career. He first campaigned for the Manitoba legislature in the 1896 provincial election, and lost to Liberal incumbent David McNaught by fifty-four votes in the Saskatchewan constituency.

He ran again for Saskatchewan in the 1899 election, and defeated Liberal candidate John Henry McConnell by fifteen votes. The Conservatives won this election, and Ferguson served in the legislature as a backbench supporter of premiers Hugh John Macdonald and Rodmond Roblin.

Redistribution forced Ferguson into the Hamiota constituency for the 1903 election, and he lost to Liberal David Jackson by twenty-two votes. He was returned to the legislature for Hamiota in the 1907 election, and won again in 1910.

Ferguson served as chair of public accounting during his time in the legislature. His biographical entry in the Canadian Parliamentary Guide indicates that he was popular with both sides of the house.

He lost to John Henry McConnell by 398 votes in the 1914 election, and by 347 votes in a 1920 rematch. Ferguson died by suicide in Pincher Creek, Alberta on October 29, 1936.
