= John Laughlin (Canadian politician) =

Canadian politician (1879–1941)

John Bell Laughlin (December 21, 1879 – August 19, 1941) was a politician in Manitoba, Canada. He served in the Legislative Assembly of Manitoba as a Conservative representative from 1927 to 1932, and again from 1936 to 1941. His father was also a member of the assembly from 1879 to 1881.

He was born near Miami, Manitoba, the son of Andrew Laughlin and Rachel Bell. His parents had come to Manitoba from Ontario in 1877. Laughtlin was educated in Cartwright, at St. John's College and the University of Manitoba. He articled in law, was called to the Manitoba bar in 1905 and practised law in Cartwright. In 1909, he married Harriet Margaret McKay. Laughlin served as reeve for the Rural Municipality of Roblin. He became the solicitor for the Roblin municipality in 1920 and held this position until his death. Laughlin was also solicitor for the Bank of Toronto.

He was first elected to the Manitoba legislature in the 1927 provincial election, defeating Progressive incumbent Andrew E. Foster by 255 votes in the constituency of Killarney. He lost to Foster by 90 votes in the 1932 election, but defeated him by 509 votes in the campaign of 1936.

The Conservative Party was Manitoba's primary opposition party during this period, and Laughlin sat with his party caucus on the opposition benches.

In 1940, the Conservatives joined with the governing Liberal-Progressives in a coalition government. Laughlin became a backbench supporter of John Bracken's government, and was re-elected in the 1941 provincial election. He again defeated Andrew E. Foster, who was by this time a dissident Liberal opposing the coalition.

Laughlin died at home in Cartwright of encephalitis several months after the election at the age of 62.

His granddaughter Linda McIntosh and great-grandson Hugh McFadyen also served in the Manitoba assembly.
