= Robert Stirton Thornton =

Canadian politician (1863–1936)

Robert Stirton Thornton (8 May 1863 – 17 September 1936) was a politician in Manitoba, Canada. He served in the Legislative Assembly of Manitoba from 1907 to 1910, and again from 1914 to 1922. Thornton was a Liberal, and served as a cabinet minister in the government or Tobias Norris.

== Life ==
Thornton was born in Edinburgh, Scotland. He was educated at Heriots School and the University of Edinburgh, receiving medical certification from the latter institution in 1884. He moved to Canada in 1884, and received an LL.D. from Queen's University in Kingston, Ontario. Thornton worked as a physician, serving as president of the Manitoba Medical Council (1896) and the Medical Council of Canada. He was also a horticulturalist and an active freemason, serving as Grand Master from 1900 of 1902.

He was first elected to the Manitoba legislature in the 1907 provincial election, defeating Conservative incumbent Edward Briggs by 41 votes in the constituency of Deloraine. Premier Rodmond Roblin's Conservatives won the election, and Thornton served as an opposition member for the next three years. He lost to Conservative John C.W. Reid by six votes in the 1910 campaign.

Thornton returned to the legislature in the 1914 election, defeating Reid by 204 votes. The Roblin government was re-elected, but was forced to resign in 1915 after being found responsible for corruption in the tendering of grants for new legislative buildings. The Liberals, though holding a minority of seats, were permitted to form government, and Thornton was appointed as Minister of Education on 12 May 1915. The Liberals were confirmed in government by a further provincial election, held on 6 August 1915. Thornton again defeated Reid, this time by 295 votes.

As education minister, Thornton oversaw the removal of funding for Manitoba's francophone denominational schools. This policy decision was popular in most of the province, though extremely unpopular in its francophone regions.

The Liberals were reduced to a minority government in the 1920 provincial election, and were weakened by the rise of organized Farmer and Labour political groups. Thornton was again re-elected over Reid, this time by 315 votes, and was retained as Minister of Education in the Norris administration. He was defeated in the 1922 provincial election, finishing third against United Farmers of Manitoba candidate Duncan Stuart McLeod.
