= Amos Lyle =

Canadian politician

Amos Moore Lyle (October 8, 1866 – April 1943) was a politician in Manitoba, Canada. He served in the Legislative Assembly of Manitoba from 1910 to 1914, as a member of the Conservative Party.

Lyle was born near Smiths Falls, Canada West (now Ontario), the son of Samuel Lyle and Mary Moore, a family that had emigrated from Ireland in 1848. He was educated at Smiths Falls and Morrisburg. He worked as a cabinet maker in Morrisburg and then went to Manitoba in 1886, and returned in 1891 after a period in British Columbia. Lyle was a farmer, and a breeder of purebred Clydesdales. He served on the town council for Lyleton. In 1900, Lyle married Lillian G. Lyle. In religion, he was a Presbyterian.

He first ran for the Manitoba legislature in the 1907 provincial election, and lost to Liberal candidate John Williams by three votes in the Arthur constituency. He ran again in the 1910 election, and defeated Williams by 175 votes. The Conservatives won the election, and Lyle served in the legislature as a backbench supporter of Rodmond Roblin's government.

He lost his constituency seat to Williams by 66 votes in the 1914 election.

Lyle died at home in Lyleton in early April 1943.
