= George Henry Bradbury =

Canadian politician

The Honourable George Henry Bradbury

Member of Parliament for Selkirk
- In office 1908–1917
- Preceded by: Samuel Jacob Jackson
- Succeeded by: Thomas Hay

Canadian Senator from Manitoba
- In office 17 December 1917 – 6 September 1925

Personal details
- Born: 25 June 1859 Hamilton, Canada West
- Died: 6 September 1925 (aged 66) Ottawa, Ontario, Canada
- Party: Conservative

George Henry Bradbury (25 June 1859 – 6 September 1925) was a Canadian politician.

== Early life ==
Bradbury was the son of William Murray Bradbury and Matilda Morrow, immigrants from Ireland, and was educated in Ottawa. He came to Manitoba in 1881, worked there as a general contractor and later became managing director for the Northwest Lumber Company. He helped establish the Manitoba Brick Company in 1906.

== Political career ==
He was elected to the House of Commons of Canada in the 1908 election as a Member of the Conservative Party to represent the riding of Selkirk. He was re-elected to the House of Commons in the 1911 general election. Bradbury was Chairman of the Select Special Committee on Pollution of Navigable Waters during the 12th Parliament. He was appointed to the Senate by Prime Minister Borden on 17 December 1917 and served as the Chairperson of the Special Committee on Cancellation of Leases to Certain Coal Areas in the Province of Alberta.

== Military career ==
Bradbury joined Boulton's Scouts in 1885 and fought during the North-West Rebellion, then served as lieutenant colonel in 1915 for the 108th Battalion, Canadian Expeditionary Force where he served for one year.

== Death ==
Bradbury died in office in Ottawa at the age of 66.
