= Richard A. N. Bonnycastle =

Canadian businessman (1934–2023)

Dick Bonnycastle
- Born: Richard Arthur Northwood Bonnycastle; September 26, 1934; Winnipeg, Manitoba, Canada
- Died: March 8, 2023 (aged 88)
- Education: University of Manitoba
- Occupations: Publisher, Investor, Conservationist, Racehorse owner/breeder
- Board member of: Harlequin Enterprises, Torstar Corporation, Cavendish Investing Ltd., Jockey Club of Canada
- Spouse: Linda Kathleen (Kathy) Nelson (married July 2012)
- Parents: Richard H. G. Bonnycastle (father); Mary Frances Margaret Northwood (mother)
- Relatives: Sisters: Honor, Judith Augusta

Richard Arthur Northwood Bonnycastle (September 26, 1934 – March 8, 2023) was a Canadian businessman. He formerly owned and was the publisher of Harlequin Enterprises (founded in 1949 by his father Richard H. G. Bonnycastle), the world's largest publisher of romantic fiction, as well was an owner of thoroughbred racehorses Harlequin Ranches. He was part of the Bonnycastle family founded in Canada by British military officer, Sir Richard Henry Bonnycastle.

Bonnycastle's career included decades of corporate governance experience, being the chairman and independent director of such Canadian corporations as Harlequin Enterprises (1968–1981), Torstar (1975–1982), The Canada Development Investment Corporation (CDIC; 1978–1988), National Leasing Group, Bracknell Corporation (1983–1990), Patheon Inc. (1984–1986), Rupertsland Resources Ltd. (1975–1983), Westco Restaurants Inc. (founders of Moxie's; 1992–1996), and Western Feedlots Ltd. (1970–1978), among others. At the time of his death in 2023, he was the Chairman and President of Cavendish Investing Ltd. and Pacific Iron Ore Corporation.

== Early life ==
Bonnycastle was born on September 26, 1934, in Winnipeg, Manitoba, to Richard H. G. Bonnycastle of the Bonnycastle family.

Bonnycastle was educated at Ravenscourt School, Winnipeg, Manitoba; Trinity College School, in Port Hope, Ontario; and graduated from the University of Manitoba in 1956 with a Bachelor of Commerce degree.

== Business career ==
After graduation he worked for the Great West Life Assurance Company and subsequently, Richardson Securities of Canada as a corporate underwriter. Concurrently, he operated Cavendish Investing Ltd., to which, commencing in 1968, he devoted all of his time.

Within a few years of taking over Harlequin Enterprises from his father, he moved the company's operations to Toronto, Ontario, where he would build it into a major international force in the book publishing industry. By 1971, he had orchestrated the buyout of British publisher Mills & Boon and had contracted with Pocket Books and Simon & Schuster to distribute the Mills & Boon novels in the United States. In addition, he oversaw expansion to Australia in 1974, The Netherlands in 1975, set up a joint venture in 1976 in West Germany and in 1977 established a subsidiary in France. Bonnycastle saw his company grow to where it would command 80% of the romance fiction market in North America. In late 1975, Toronto Star Ltd. purchased a 52.5% interest in Harlequin Enterprises and in 1981 acquired the balance of the company's shares.

Bonnycastle also published 4 books: To Ride the Wind – Albert Hochbaum, A Gentleman Adventurer, I Fought Reil, My Life with Birds – Angus Shortt.

== Harlequin Ranches ==
Bonnycastle's great-great-great-grandfather, Darcy Boulton, was Canada's first racing steward. Bonnycastle became involved with the sport of thoroughbred horse racing in the early 1970s. In 1973, he was one of the founding members of the board of stewards of the Jockey Club of Canada and served as its chairman starting in 2005.

Racing under the name Harlequin Ranches at racetracks across Canada as well as in the United States, he has also campaigned horses in Europe. In the 1970s, one of his best runners in Canada was a multiple stakes-winning son of the great Northern Dancer named Nice Dancer. In 1978, Bonnycastle won the Classic 1,000 Guineas Stakes with Enstone Spark. He was also a partner in Mr Combustible who won the 2001 Chester Vase and Geoffrey Freer Stakes and in Canada, his filly, Gold Strike, was voted the 2005 Canadian Champion 3-Year-Old Filly. Bonnycastle was a partner in Yankee Bravo who won the 2008 California Derby.

== Personal life and death ==
Bonnycastle supported various causes related to nature and the environment and had been a council member of Fort Whyte Centre for Environmental Education (1988–2015), trustee of the Institute for Wetland and Waterfowl Research (1990–1995), co-founder of the Canadian Parks and Wilderness Association (1988), trustee of the North American Wildlife Foundation, operating Delta Waterfowl and Wetlands Research Station (1978–1988).

Bonnycastle died on March 8, 2023, at the age of 88.
