= Heather Robertson =

Canadian journalist, novelist and non-fiction writer (1942–2014)

Heather Margaret Robertson (March 19, 1942 – March 19, 2014) was a Canadian journalist, novelist and non-fiction writer. She published her first book, Reservations are for Indians, in 1970, and her last book, Walking into Wilderness, in 2010. She was a founding member of the Writers' Union of Canada and the Professional Writers Association of Canada, and launched the Robertson v Thomson Corp class action suit regarding freelancers' retention of electronic rights to their work.

== Early life ==
Heather Robertson was born in Winnipeg in 1942. After graduating from Kelvin High School, she completed an Honours BA in English at the University of Manitoba in 1962. Following this, she completed a master's degree at Columbia University

== Career ==
Robertson began her journalism career at the Winnipeg Free Press then moved to the Winnipeg Tribune. In the late 1960s, she received a grant to study native people; this research provided much of the material for her first book, Reservations are for Indians, published in 1970.

Robertson published four books in the 1970s, including Grass Roots, which profiles four modern prairie towns and the difficulties faced by farmers in Western Canada, Salt of the Earth and A Terrible Beauty: The Art of Canada at War. In 1981 she chronicled the life of the Winnipeg bank robber Ken Leishman in The Flying Bandit.

In the 1980s, Robertson turned to fiction based on real-life characters, and won the Books In Canada Best First Novel Award for Willie, A Romance, based on the life of former Prime Minister William Lyon Mackenzie King. Two more novels followed: Lily: A Rhapsody in Red and Igor: A Novel of Intrigue.

Throughout her writing career, Robertson was a prolific freelancer for the CBC and national magazines such as Maclean's, Chatelaine, Saturday Night, Canadian Forum and Equinox.

== Personal life ==
She lived in King City, Ontario, with her husband Andrew Marshall. She died of cancer on March 19, 2014, her 72nd birthday.

== Awards and honours ==
- 1983 Canadian Authors' Association Fiction Prize (for Willie: A Romance)
- 1983 Books in Canada Best First Novel Prize (for Willie: A Romance)
- 1995 National Business Book Award (for Driving Force)
- 1998 Honorary Doctor of Laws, University of Manitoba
- 2003 Lawrence Jackson Award for Achievement, Professional Writers Association of Canada
- 2003 Ontario Historical Society, Best Regional History (for Magical, Mysterious Lake of the Woods)

== Bibliography ==
=== Novels ===
- Willie: A Romance (1983) Lorimer
- Lily: A Rhapsody in Red (1986) Lorimer
- Igor: A Novel of Intrigue (1989) Lorimer

=== Non-fiction ===
- Reservations are for Indians (1970) Lorimer
- Grass Roots (1973) Lorimer
- Salt of the Earth (1974) Lorimer
- A Terrible Beauty: the Art of Canada at War (1977) Lorimer
- The Flying Bandit (1981) Lorimer
- A Gentleman Adventurer: The Arctic Diaries of Richard H. G. Bonnycastle (1984) Lester & Orpen Dennys
- More than a Rose: Prime Ministers, Wives and other Women (1991) Seal Books
- On the Hill: A People's Guide to Canada's Parliament (1992) McClelland & Stewart
- Driving Force: The McLaughlin Family and the Age of the Car (1995) McClelland & Stewart
- Writing from Life: A Guide for Writing True Stories (1998) McClelland & Stewart
- Meeting Death: In Hospital, Hospice and at Home (2000) McClelland & Stewart
- Magical, Mysterious Lake of the Woods (with Melinda McCracken) (2003) Heartland Associates
- Measuring Mother Earth: How Joe the Kid became Tyrrell of the North (2007) McClelland & Stewart
- Walking into Wilderness: The Toronto Carrying Place and Nine Mile Portage (2010) Heartland Associates
