= Angus Bonnycastle =

Canadian politician

Angus L. Bonnycastle
- Born: November 3, 1873; Campbellford, Ontario, Canada
- Died: September 9, 1941 (aged 67); Dauphin, Manitoba, Canada
- Occupations: Lawyer, politician, judge
- Political party: Progressive Conservative
- Spouse: Ellen Mary Boulton
- Children: 6, including Richard H. G. Bonnycastle
- Parent(s): Richard Henry Bonnycastle II & Charlotte Kate Cassan

Angus Lorne Bonnycastle (November 3, 1873 – September 9, 1941) was a politician in Manitoba, Canada. He served in the Legislative Assembly of Manitoba from 1907 to 1911, as a member of the Conservative Party. A member of the Bonnycastle family, he was the great-grandson of military engineer Richard Henry Bonnycastle.

== Life ==
Bonnycastle was born in Campbellford, Ontario, and educated there. He moved to Manitoba in 1893 and became a barrister in 1905.

In 1902 Bonnycastle married Ellen Mary Boulton, the daughter of Charles Arkall Boulton, a member of the Senate of Canada. They had six children including Richard H. G. Bonnycastle, who founded Harlequin Enterprises, the world's largest publisher of romance novels.

Bonnycastle first ran for the Manitoba legislature in the 1903 provincial election, and lost to Liberal candidate W. J. Doig by 124 votes in Russell. He ran again in the 1907 election, and defeated new Liberal candidate T. A. Wright by nine votes. The Conservatives won the election, and Bonnycastle served as a government backbencher. He was re-elected by eight votes in the 1910 election, and resigned from the legislature in 1911.

Despite being forty years old, Angus Bonnycastle volunteered to serve overseas with the Canadian Expeditionary Force during World War I. As a lieutenant-colonel, he led the 200th Battalion. At the end of the war, he was appointed a county court judge in Dauphin, Manitoba, a position held until his death there in 1941.
