= Arthur Lobb =

Canadian politician

Arthur John Lobb (July 26, 1871—July 4, 1928) was a politician in Manitoba, Canada. He served in the Legislative Assembly of Manitoba from 1915 to 1920, as a member of the Liberal Party.

Lobb was born in Cornwall, United Kingdom, the son of John Lobb, and was educated at English public schools. He moved to Canada in 1894, and worked as a general merchant and grain and lumber dealer. In religion, he was a Methodist. Lobb married Elizabeth Geddes in 1907.

He first ran for the Manitoba legislature in the 1914 provincial election, and lost to Conservative Isaac Riley by fifty-nine votes in the constituency of Rockwood. He ran again in the 1915 election, and defeated Conservative candidate Thomas Scott by 636 votes. The Liberals won this election, and Lobb served as a backbench supporter of Tobias Norris's administration for the next five years.

He ran for re-election in the 1920 provincial election, but lost to Farmer candidate William McKinnell by a single vote. He attempted to return to the legislature in the 1927 election, but placed third against McKinnell.

He died at home in Winnipeg at the age of 56.
