= John Williams (Manitoba politician) =

Canadian politician (1860-1931)

John Williams (July 3, 1860 – March 2, 1931) was a politician in Manitoba, Canada. He served in the Legislative Assembly of Manitoba from 1907 to 1910 and again from 1914 to 1922. Williams was a member of the Manitoba Liberal Party and briefly served as a cabinet minister in the government of Tobias Norris.

Born at Ysceifiog in Flintshire, Wales, the son of Thomas Williams and Hannah Phillips, Williams was educated at common schools. After reaching the age of thirteen, he worked in the lead means, farmed, and then came to Canada in May 1881 with "absolutely no capital." After living in Hamilton, Ontario, where he worked on a farm for a year and a half, he moved to Manitoba in November 1882 to become a farmer. He remained in this vocation until 1906 and served as director of the Melita Farmers' Elevator Company. Williams also served as president of the local Grain Growers' Association and Agricultural Society and was reeve for the Rural Municipality of Arthur.

Williams first sought election to the Manitoba legislature in the 1903 provincial election, running in the southwestern constituency of Arthur. He lost to Conservative incumbent Allen Thompson by forty-eight votes. Thompson retired at the 1907 election, and Williams defeated new Conservative candidate Amos Lyle by a margin of three votes (536 to 533). Williams served as an opposition member for the next three years.

In the provincial election of 1910, Lyle defeated Williams by 175 votes to regain Arthur for the Conservatives. Control of the riding shifted again in the 1914 campaign when Williams defeated Lyle by sixty-six votes. He again served as an opposition member.

Early in 1915, the governing Conservative Party of Rodmond Roblin was forced from office amid a scandal. The Liberals won a landslide victory in the 1915 provincial election, and Williams was elected by an increased margin in Arthur. After this election, he supported Norris's ministry as a backbench supporter. In the 1920 election, Williams defeated Farmer candidate Duncan Lloyd McLeod by only ten votes.

Norris's Liberals were reduced to a minority government in the 1920 election and had difficulty passing legislative initiatives in the next two years. The government was defeated in the legislature in early 1922, and elections were called for later. Williams was called on to play a prominent role in the campaign and was promoted to cabinet on June 6, 1922, as Minister of Agriculture.

The United Farmers of Manitoba defeated the Liberals in the 1922 provincial election, and Williams lost his seat to McLeod by 353 votes. He resigned from cabinet with the rest of the Norris ministry on August 8, 1922.

In the 1925 federal election, Williams run for the House of Commons of Canada as the candidate for the Liberal Party of Canada in Souris. He finished third against Progressive candidate James Steedsman.

In 1928, Williams was named Canadian commissioner of immigration for Wales.

He was married to Clementine Rogers in 1892.

Williams died on his farm in Melita at the age of 70.
