= Andrew Foster (politician) =

Canadian politician (1867–1956)

Andrew Edmond Foster (October 12, 1867 – November 5, 1956) was a politician in Manitoba, Canada. He served in the Legislative Assembly of Manitoba from 1922 to 1927, and again from 1932 to 1936.

Foster was born in Enterprise, Ontario, the son of Andrew Foster and Annabella Victoria Boddy, and was educated in that province. He worked as a farmer.

He was first elected to the Manitoba legislature in the 1922 provincial election. Running as a candidate of the United Farmers of Manitoba (UFM) in the Killarney constituency, he defeated his Conservative opponent G.W. Waldon by 202 votes. The UFM unexpectedly won a majority of seats in this election, and formed government as the Progressive Party. Foster was a backbench supporter of John Bracken's government.

In the 1927 provincial election, Foster lost to Conservative candidate John Laughlin by 255 votes. He was returned to the legislature in the 1932 election, defeating Laughlin by 90 votes. Prior to this election, the Progressive Party had formed an electoral alliance with the Manitoba Liberal Party, and government members became known as "Liberal-Progressives". Foster again served as a backbench supporter of Bracken's ministry.

He lost to Laughlin for a second time in the 1936 election, this time by 509 votes.

In 1940, the Liberal-Progressives and Conservatives formed a wartime coalition government. Foster again challenged Laughlin in Hamiota, this time running as an anti-coalition Liberal. Laughlin, now a supporter of Bracken's government, won the challenge easily.
