= Roger Marion =

Canadian politician

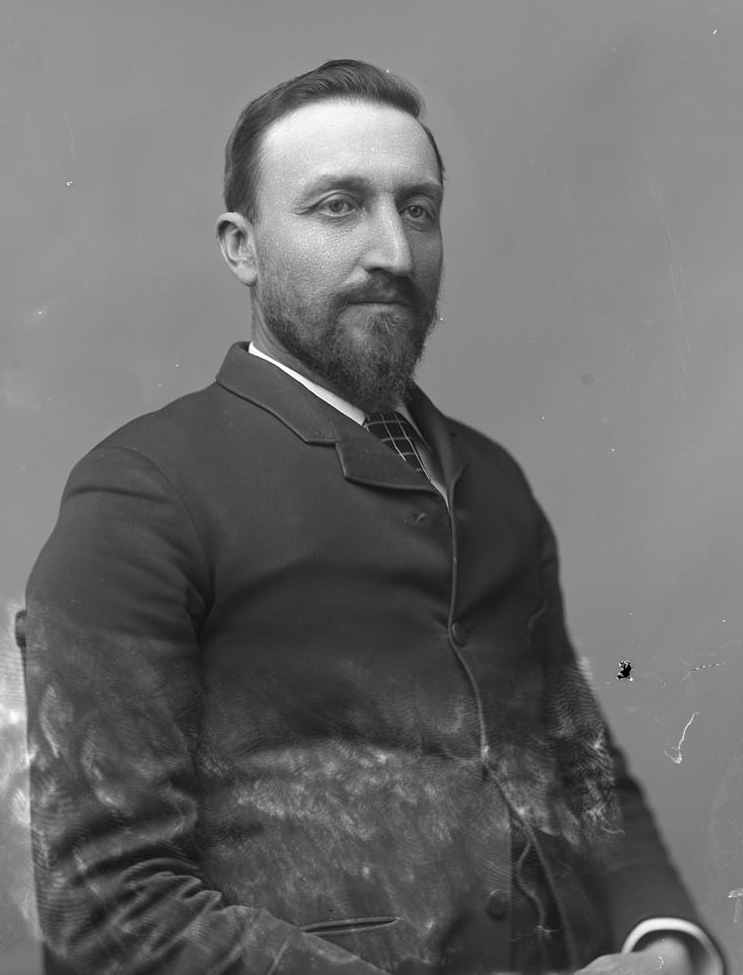
- Marion, c. 1889

Member of the Legislative Assembly of Manitoba for Carillon
- In office April 14, 1887 – June 16, 1888
- Preceded by: New riding
- Succeeded by: Martin Jérôme

Member of the Legislative Assembly of Manitoba for St. Boniface
- In office February 6, 1896 – November 16, 1899
- Preceded by: Alphonse LaRiviere
- Succeeded by: James Prendergast

Personal details
- Born: August 5, 1846
- Died: April 13, 1920 (aged 73)
- Party: Progressive Conservative
- Spouse: Julienne Carriere
- Occupation: Trader, civil servant

Roger Marion (August 5, 1846 – April 13, 1920) was a Metis trader, civil servant and political figure in Manitoba. He represented Carillon from 1886 to 1888 and from 1896 to 1899 and St. Boniface from 1888 to 1892 in the Legislative Assembly of Manitoba as a Conservative.

He was born in York Factory, the son of Narcisse Marion and Marie Bouchard, and was educated at the Collége de Saint-Boniface. Marion worked at Charles Bottineau's trading post in Dakota Territory for several years. From 1872 to 1876, he worked for the Customs Service in Manitoba and then was Manitoba License Commissioner from 1879 to 1885. In 1873, Marion married Julienne Carriere. He served on the council for St. Boniface and was mayor from 1887 to 1890. Marion was elected president of the Union nationale métisse Saint-Joseph du Manitoba in 1891.

He was defeated when he ran for reelection to the provincial assembly in 1892 before being elected again in 1896 and then was defeated again in 1899.

Marion died in St. Boniface at the age of 73.
