= Stanley McInnis =

Canadian politician (1865–1907)

Stanley William McInnis
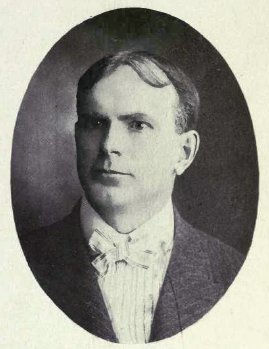

Member of the Legislative Assembly of Manitoba
- In office 1899–1907

Personal details
- Born: October 8, 1865 Saint John, New Brunswick
- Died: November 4, 1907 (aged 42) Brandon, Manitoba, Canada

Stanley William McInnis (October 8, 1865 – November 4, 1907) was a Canadian dentist and politician in Manitoba. He served in the Legislative Assembly of Manitoba from 1899 to 1907 as a member of the Conservative Party, and was briefly a cabinet minister in the government of Rodmond Roblin.

McInnis was born in Saint John, New Brunswick, and was educated at Manitoba College and the Philadelphia Dental College. He practiced as a dentist before entering political life. In 1902, he moved a motion at a meeting of the Canadian Dental Association to adopt a code of ethics.

He was first elected to the Manitoba legislature in the 1899 provincial election, defeating Liberal Party incumbent Charles Adams by eight votes in Brandon City. He served as a backbench supporter of the governments of Hugh John Macdonald and Rodmond Roblin in the legislative sitting that following. On March 1, 1902, he was named Acting Speaker of the Legislative Assembly of Manitoba in lieu of a full-time Speaker.

McInnis was re-elected with increased majorities in the 1903 and 1907 elections, and was named to cabinet on June 26, 1907 as Provincial Secretary and Municipal Commissioner. His time in office was brief, as he died on November 4 of the same year.
