= Samuel Jacob Jackson =

Canadian politician

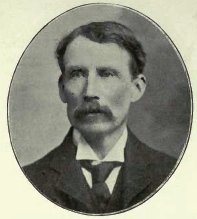

Member of the Canadian Parliament for Selkirk
- In office November 3, 1904 – October 26, 1908
- Preceded by: William McCreary
- Succeeded by: George Henry Bradbury

9th Speaker of the Legislative Assembly of Manitoba
- In office February 25, 1891 – January 15, 1895
- Preceded by: William Winram
- Succeeded by: Finlay Young

Member of the Legislative Assembly of Manitoba for Rockwood
- In office January 23, 1883 – December 7, 1899
- Preceded by: John Aikins
- Succeeded by: Isaac Riley

Personal details
- Born: February 18, 1848 Stradbally, Ireland
- Died: May 29, 1942 (aged 94)
- Party: Liberal
- Occupation: merchant and mill owner

Samuel Jacob Jackson (February 18, 1848 – May 29, 1942) was a Canadian politician.

Born in Stradbally, Queen's County, Ireland, the son of Samuel Jackson and Elizabeth Sutcliffe, Jackson was educated at Brampton and at Brantford, Ontario. He moved west to Manitoba in 1871. Jackson later became a partner in a mercantile firm in Winnipeg. In 1878, he married Ida Isabella Clark. Jackson later moved to Stonewall, where he was a merchant and mill owner.

He was elected to the Legislative Assembly of Manitoba for the electoral district of Rockwood in 1883, 1884, 1886, 1888, 1892 and 1896. He was defeated in 1899. From 1891 to 1895, he was the Speaker of the Legislative Assembly.

He was first returned to House of Commons of Canada in the general elections of 1904 for the riding of Selkirk. A Liberal, he was defeated in 1908. He was an Alderman in the Winnipeg City Council in 1877, 1878 and 1880. Jackson was chairman of the Board of Works for Winnipeg in 1882.
