= Thomas Kellett =

Canadian politician

Member of the Manitoba Legislative Assembly for Deloraine, Manitoba
- In office 1892–1895

Personal details
- Born: c. 1860 Manitoba
- Died: November 2, 1907 Winnipeg
- Party: Progressive Conservative Party of Manitoba
- Occupation: Station agent for the Canadian Pacific Railway at Brandon, Manitoba, grain broker, employment officer

Thomas Henry "Tom" Kellett (c. 1860 – November 2, 1907) was a railway agent and political figure in Manitoba. He represented Deloraine from 1892 to 1895 in the Legislative Assembly of Manitoba as a Conservative.

He was the first station agent for the Canadian Pacific Railway at Brandon, Manitoba and served for many years as station agent at Deloraine, where he also profited by speculating in land. In 1887, Kellett married Elizabeth Woodhouse. From 1895 to 1901, he was a grain broker. In 1901, he opened an employment office in Winnipeg.

He died at home in Winnipeg at the age of 47.
