= George Rogers (Manitoba politician) =

Canadian politician

George Rogers (January 29, 1856 – August 11, 1901) was a miller, grain merchant and political figure in Manitoba. He represented Norfolk from 1896 to 1899 in the Legislative Assembly of Manitoba as a Liberal.

== Background ==
Born in Tottenham, Canada West, Rogers was the son of Stephen Rogers, a United Empire Loyalist, and was educated there and at Pickering College. Rogers served on the Carberry school board. In 1884, he married Maggie Bride. He died in 1901.
