= Thomas Dickie =

Canadian politician

Thomas Dickie (October 24, 1860 – December 16, 1935) was a journalist, lawyer and political figure in Manitoba. He represented Avondale from 1896 to 1899 in the Legislative Assembly of Manitoba as a Liberal.

He was born at Puslinch Lake, Wellington County, Canada West, the son of James Dickie, a native of Scotland, and Elizabeth Stewart. Dickie was educated locally, in Guelph and in St. Catharines. He was a publisher and editor and also served as a justice of the peace. In 1892, Dickie married Sarah J. Griffiths, a widow. He trained as a lawyer and, after leaving politics, practised law in Winnipeg. Around 1911, Dickie moved to Vancouver, British Columbia.

He died in Vancouver at the age of 75.
