= Alexander Cumming Fraser =

Canadian politician

Alexander Cumming Fraser (1845 – December 15, 1944) was a merchant and political figure in Manitoba. He represented Brandon North from 1896 to 1899 in the Legislative Assembly of Manitoba as a Liberal.

== Background ==
Born in Renfrew County, Canada West, Fraser moved to Brandon in 1881, where he opened a dry goods store in 1883. He was mayor of Brandon from 1887 to 1889 and from 1901 to 1902. During Fraser's time as mayor, sidewalks and electric lighting were introduced to the city. He was elected to the Manitoba assembly in an 1896 by-election held after Clifford Sifton was named to the Canadian cabinet. Fraser was defeated when he ran for reelection in 1899 and again in 1903 when he ran for the Brandon City seat.

== Police Magistrate ==
He sold his dry goods business to Isaiah R. Strome in 1911. In 1912, he became manager for the Brandon News. Fraser was named police magistrate for Brandon in 1915, serving until 1933.
