= William Alexander Macdonald =

Canadian politician

William Alexander Macdonald (1860 – October 1, 1946) was a Manitoba lawyer and politician and British Columbia judge. He briefly served as leader of the Manitoba Conservatives during the 1890s.

== Biography ==
=== Early life ===
Macdonald was born in St. Catharines, Ontario, the son of Frederick William Macdonald, and was educated there and at Osgoode Hall. Macdonald was called to the bars of both Ontario and Manitoba in 1882. He practised in Brandon, Manitoba from 1882 to 1897.

=== Political career ===
Macdonald first ran for public office in the provincial election of 1888, losing in the riding of North Brandon to Liberal Clifford Sifton, who went on to become an important provincial and federal cabinet minister. Macdonald was elected for Brandon City in 1892, defeating incumbent Liberal James Smart by 12 votes.

Before the 1892 election, Rodmond Roblin had been the de facto leader of the opposition Conservative caucus. With Roblin having lost his seat, Macdonald was chosen as his replacement and was recognized as the official leader of the opposition. He did not serve in this capacity long; Macdonald's election was declared void in mid-1893, and he lost a by-election to Liberal Charles Adams on September 8 of the same year.

In 1896, Macdonald ran federally as the official Conservative candidate in Brandon. He was defeated by D'Alton McCarthy, a maverick Conservative who opposed the extension of French-language rights and was supported by local Liberals.

=== Later years ===
From 1897 to 1909, Macdonald practised law in Nelson, British Columbia. In 1909, he moved to Vancouver, where he was counsel for the board of trade. In 1913, Macdonald was named judge in the Supreme Court of British Columbia. He died in Vancouver at the age of 86.
