= Thomas Herman Johnson =

Canadian politician (1870–1927)

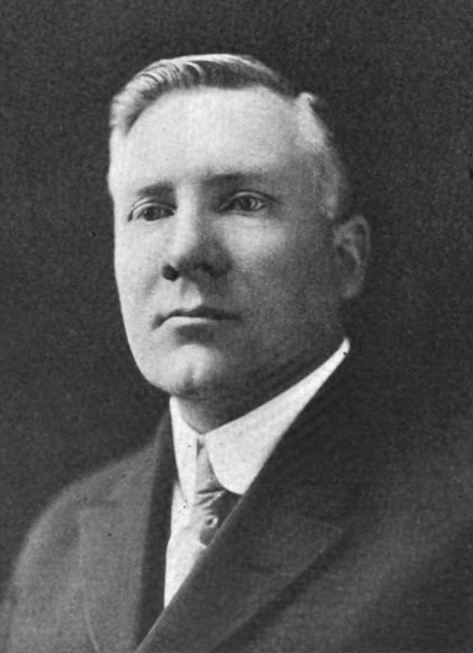

Member of the Legislative Assembly of Manitoba
- In office 1907–1922
- Constituency: Winnipeg West

Personal details
- Born: February 12, 1870 Iceland
- Died: May 20, 1927 (aged 57) Winnipeg, Manitoba
- Party: Liberal
- Spouse: Aurora Frederickson (m. 1898)
- Children: 3
- Occupation: Lawyer, politician

Thomas Herman Johnson (born. Tómas Hermann Jónsson) (February 12, 1870 – May 20, 1927) was a politician in Manitoba, Canada. He served in the Legislative Assembly of Manitoba from 1907 to 1922, and was a prominent cabinet minister in the government of Tobias Norris. Johnson was a member of the Liberal Party.

== Biography ==
Johnson was born in Iceland, and moved to Manitoba with his family in 1878. He was educated in Winnipeg public schools, and received a Bachelor of Arts degree from Gustavus Adolphus College. After worked as a teacher, he entered the law office of Richards & Bradshaw in 1895 and was admitted to the Bar of the Province in 1900. He subsequently worked as a barrister-at-law, and was also appointed census commissioner for Manitoba in 1901. Johnson served on the Winnipeg School Board from 1904 to 1907. In religion, he was a Lutheran.

He married Aurora Frederickson in 1898 and they had three children.

He was first elected to the Manitoba legislature in the 1907 provincial election, defeating candidates from the Conservative and Labour parties in Winnipeg West. He was re-elected over Conservative A.J. Andrews by 240 votes in the 1910 election. Following redistribution for the 1914 election, he defeated Andrews again by 1,050 votes in Winnipeg Centre "A". Manitoba was governed by Rodmond Roblin's Conservatives during this period, and Johnson served as a member of the opposition. Known as a reformer, he was popular with Winnipeg's working-class community and won the support of many progressive electors.

In 1915, the Roblin government was forced to resign from office following a corruption scandal involving the tendering of contracts for new legislative buildings. Although they did not hold a majority of seats in the legislature, the Liberals under Tobias Norris were called upon to form a new administration. Norris became premier on May 15, 1915, and chose Johnson as his Minister of Public Works. A new election was held, which the Liberals won in a landslide majority. Johnson was not opposed by Labour, and received more than three times of the votes of his Conservative opponent.

After a cabinet shuffle on November 10, 1917, Johnson was named Attorney General and Minister of Telephones and Telegraphs. He was not involved in the trials that resulted from the Winnipeg General Strike of 1919. Many members of Norris's government favoured a negotiated settlement with the strikers, and the subsequent legal charges against the strike leaders were launched as a private prosecution by the Citizens' Committee of one Thousand, funded by the federal Department of Justice, and allowed to proceed by Johnson as Attorney General. Later, Johnson defended the prosecutions in the spring of 1921 when Fred Dixon brought a motion to the floor of the Manitoba legislature seeking the release of the imprisoned strike leaders.

Prior to the 1920 provincial election, the province's electoral laws were changed such that the city of Winnipeg became a single constituency, electing ten members by a single transferable ballot. Johnson led the Liberal ticket in the city, and was declared elected with a second-place finish on the first count. Across, the province, however, the Liberals were reduced to a minority government following the rise of Farmer and Labour parliamentary groups.

Johnson resigned from cabinet on June 6, 1922, and did not run in the 1922 provincial election.

He died at his home in Winnipeg on May 20, 1927.
