= Harold Hartney (footballer) =

Australian rules footballer, born 1909

Personal information
- Full name: Harold Hartney
- Born: 5 September 1909
- Died: 18 October 1963 (aged 54)
- Original team: East Brunswick

Playing career^{1}
Years	Club	Games (Goals)
1931	Fitzroy	4 (0)
- ^{1} Playing statistics correct to the end of 1931.

Harold Hartney (5 September 1909 – 18 October 1963) was an Australian rules footballer who played with Fitzroy in the Victorian Football League (VFL).
