= Bonnycastle family =

The Bonnycastle family of Canada include:

- Sir Richard Henry Bonnycastle (1791–1847), British soldier
- Henry William John Bonnycastle (1813–1888), lawyer, militiaman, farmer, councillor, artist
- Angus Bonnycastle (1873–1941), lawyer, politician, judge
- Richard H. G. Bonnycastle (1903–1968), lawyer, fur trader, adventurer, book publisher who owned Harlequin Enterprises
- Richard A. N. Bonnycastle (1934–2023), book publisher, investor, conservationist, racehorse owner/breeder
