= George Steel (Canadian politician) =

Canadian politician

George Steel (June 3, 1858 – August 20, 1940) was a politician in Manitoba, Canada. He served in the Legislative Assembly of Manitoba from 1899 to 1915.

== Biography ==
Steel was born in Ayrshire, Scotland, the son of John Steel, and was educated at public schools in Lorne and Dallegles. He worked as a farmer, and resided in Glenboro, Manitoba. In religion, Steel was a Presbyterian.

He was first elected to the Manitoba legislature in the 1899 provincial election, defeating Liberal incumbent Alfred Doig by 98 votes in the constituency of Cypress. He identified himself as a "Liberal-Conservative", and sat as a backbench supporter the Conservative administrations led by Hugh John Macdonald and Rodmond Roblin.

Steel was re-elected in the 1903 election as a Liberal-Conservative, and in the elections of 1907, 1910 and 1914 as a Conservative. He continued to serve as a backbench supporter of Roblin's administration throughout this period.

In 1915, the Roblin government was forced to resign amid a serious corruption scandal. A new election was called, which the Liberals won in a landslide. Steel lost his constituency seat to Liberal Andrew Myles by sixty-two votes.

He died in Glenboro at the age of 82.
