= Herbert Graham =

Canadian politician

Herbert Clement Graham (February 27, 1856 – 1934) was a farmer and political figure in Manitoba. He represented Brandon South from 1892 to 1899 in the Legislative Assembly of Manitoba as a Liberal.

He was born in Oxford County, Canada West, the son of Allen E. Graham, and farmed there and in Kent County. In 1877, Graham came to Manitoba and settled on a farm northwest of Winnipeg. He married Annie Cunningham in 1878. After four years, he moved to a new farm in the Brandon Hills area, which he operated until he retired to Brandon in 1896. He also owned a retail lumber and coal business at Carroll and held real estate throughout the province. From 1885 to 1888, Graham served on the council for the Rural Municipality of Oakland.

He retired from politics in 1897, becoming customs collector for western Manitoba.
