= Duncan Cameron (Conservative MLA) =

Canadian politician (1863–1942)

Duncan Cameron (May 1, 1863 – September 23, 1942) was a politician in Manitoba, Canada. He served in the Legislative Assembly of Manitoba from 1908 to 1910, as an Independent Conservative.

Cameron was born in Morven, Argyllshire, Scotland, and was educated at Oban. He later moved to Canada, and became a farmer. He was one of the first homesteaders at Gilbert Plains in Manitoba, taking up land in 1889. He operated a general store in the community from 1893 to 1899, and become its first reeve upon its official establishment as a municipality. In 1896, he married Christina McTavish. In religion, Cameron was a Presbyterian.

He was elected to the Manitoba legislature in a by-election on November 17, 1908. Cameron was supported by the official Conservative Party, and defeated Liberal candidate A.D. Cummings by 39 votes to win election in the Gilbert Plains division. He served in the legislature for nearly two years as a backbench supporter of Rodmond Roblin's government, and did not seek re-election in 1910.
