= George Lawrence (politician) =

Canadian politician

George Lawrence (March 21, 1857 – 1924) was a Canadian politician who served in the Legislative Assembly of Manitoba from 1899 to 1915 as a member of the Conservative Party and was a cabinet minister in the government of Rodmond Roblin.

Born in Canada West, the son of Noble and Sarah (Lyons) Lawrence, both of whom were natives of Ireland, he was educated in Zephyr, and Uxbridge. In 1878 he moved to Manitoba to work as a farmer. Lawrence was a Presbyterian in his religion.

He first ran for the Manitoba legislature in the 1892 provincial election, in the constituency of Killarney. He lost to Liberal incumbent Finlay Young by 153 votes. He ran again in the 1899 election and this time defeated Young by 140 votes. The Conservatives won a majority government in this election, and Lawrence served as a government backbencher. He was easily returned in the 1903 election, as the opposition vote was split between Liberal and Prohibition candidates.

Lawrence was re-elected in the 1907 provincial election, defeating Liberal R.L. Richardson by 156 votes. He was again returned in the 1910 campaign, and was promoted to Roblin's cabinet on October 11, 1911, as Minister of Agriculture and Immigration.

Lawrence was elected for a fifth time in the 1914 election, defeating Liberal Samuel Hayden by 68 votes. He was retained in his cabinet portfolio for the legislative session that followed.

In 1915, the Roblin administration was forced to resign from office after a report commissioned by the Lieutenant Governor found the government guilty of corruption in the tendering of contracts for new legislative buildings. All ministers in the government, including Lawrence, resigned their portfolios on May 12, 1915. A new election was called, which the Liberals won in a landslide. Lawrence lost the Killarney constituency of Hayden, by 124 votes.
