= James Hartney =

Canadian politician

James Harvey Hartney
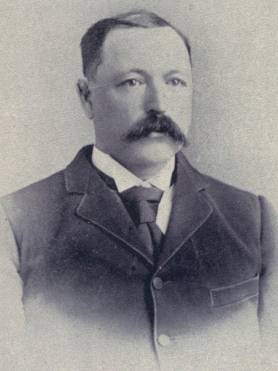

Member of the Legislative Assembly of Manitoba for Avondale
- In office 1892–1895

Personal details
- Born: September 22, 1848; Arnprior, Ontario, Canada
- Died: December 27, 1924 (aged 76); Toronto, Ontario, Canada

James Harvey Hartney (September 22, 1848 – December 27, 1924) was a merchant, farmer and political figure in Manitoba. He represented Avondale from 1892 to 1895 in the Legislative Assembly of Manitoba as a Conservative.

He was born in Arnprior, Renfrew County, Canada West, the son of James Hartney, a native of Ireland, and Elizabeth Harvey, and was educated in Pakenham. Hartney began work in his father's business and then purchased the business with a partner, James M. Robertson, in 1870. Later, with another partner, he purchased a store in Arnprior, which he operated until he moved west to Manitoba in 1881. Hartney settled on a farm near the current town of Hartney, which was named in his honour. In 1890, he moved to Souris, where he bought a store previously owned by W.H. Hall & Company. Hartney served as reeve for the Rural Municipality of Glenwood in 1891. He moved the store to Hartney, where he served as postmaster.

He was married twice: first to Sarah Jane Cowan in 1870 and then to Annie Evans Cuthbert after the death of his first wife.

Hartney was defeated when he ran for reelection to the Manitoba assembly in 1896.

In 1900, he was named an immigration agent stationed in Toronto for the government of Manitoba. Hartney died at a hospital in Toronto at the age of 76.
