= Isaac Riley =

Canadian politician

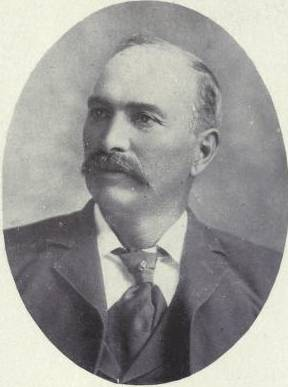

Member of the Legislative Assembly of Manitoba for Rockwood
- In office 1899–1915

Personal details
- Born: October 1853 Perth County, Ontario
- Died: July 8, 1926 (aged 72) Stonewall, Manitoba

Isaac Riley (October 1853—July 8, 1926) was a politician in Manitoba, Canada. He served in the Legislative Assembly of Manitoba from 1899 to 1915 as a member of the Conservative Party.

Riley was born in Mornington Township in Perth County, Canada West (now Ontario), the son of Charles Riley, and was educated at public schools. He entered business as a lumber merchant. In 1876, Riley came to Winnipeg. He later moved to Stonewall, Manitoba where he was a lumber merchant and also owned a hotel. In 1882, Riley married Laura M. Poore.

He was first elected to the Manitoba legislature in the 1899 provincial election, defeating Liberal incumbent Samuel Jacob Jackson by sixty-five votes in the Rockwood constituency. The Conservatives won a majority government, and Riley served as a backbench supporter of the administrations led by the Hugh John Macdonald and Rodmond Roblin. Riley was re-elected in the elections of 1903, 1907, 1910 and 1914, and continued to serve as a government backbencher. In the 1914 campaign, he defeated Liberal candidate Arthur Lobb by fifty-nine votes.

The Roblin administration was forced to resign in 1915 amid a serious corruption scandal. A new general election was called, which the Liberals won in a landslide. Riley did not seek re-election.

He died in Stonewall in 1926.
