= Richard H. G. Bonnycastle =

Canadian lawyer and businessman (1903–1968)

- Born: August 25, 1903; Binscarth, Manitoba, Canada
- Died: September 29, 1968 (aged 65); Lake Winnipegosis, Manitoba, Canada
- Education: Trinity College, Toronto; Oxford University
- Occupations: Lawyer, fur trader, adventurer, book publisher
- Known for: Harlequin Books
- Board member of: Harlequin Enterprises, Ducks Unlimited Canada
- Spouse: Mary Northwood
- Children: Richard Arthur Northwood, Honor, Judith Augusta
- Parent(s): Angus Lorne Bonnycastle & Ellen Mary Boulton
- Awards: Manitoba Golden Boy Award (1967); Bonnycastle Park, Winnipeg, Manitoba; R. H. G. Bonnycastle School, Winnipeg, Manitoba; The Bonnycastle lecture at the University of Winnipeg

Richard Henry Gardyn Bonnycastle (August 25, 1903 – September 29, 1968) was a Canadian lawyer, fur trader, adventurer, and a businessman who helped found and then owned the romance novel publishing company, Harlequin Enterprises.

== Biography ==
Born in Binscarth, Manitoba, Richard was the first of the six children of Ellen Boulton and Angus Bonnycastle, a lawyer and provincial politician. He was educated at University of Trinity College in Toronto, Ontario and at England's Oxford University where he toured Europe as a member of the university's ice hockey team which included a future Prime Minister of Canada, Lester Pearson, and a future Governor General of Canada, Roland Michener.

In 1925, Richard Bonnycastle went to work for the Hudson's Bay Company. Between 1926 and 1937 he worked as a junior accountant before winding up as district manager for its western Arctic operations. In 1984, his diaries of the years he spent in the north were edited and compiled by journalist and author Heather Robertson and published as A Gentleman Adventurer: The Arctic Diaries of R.H.G. Bonnycastle.

In 1931, Bonnycastle married Mary Northwood. The couple had three children.

== Harlequin Enterprises ==
In 1945 Bonnycastle went to work for Advocate Printers in Winnipeg, Manitoba. Harlequin was founded in 1949 as a partnership between Advocate Printers, Doug Weld of Bryant Press in Toronto, and Jack Palmer who was then head of the Canadian distributor for the Saturday Evening Post and the Ladies' Home Journal. Created as a publishing operation to reprint low-cost paperback novels, Harlequin initially focused on mystery fiction, westerns and cookbooks. In the early 1950s, Richard Bonnycastle obtained a 25% ownership in the struggling Harlequin operation and soon would acquire seventy-five percent of what was a business teetering on the edge of collapse. A twenty-five percent share of the company was given to key staff member, Ruth Palmour.

Under the direction of Bonnycastle, the company's fortunes started to change. In 1953 Harlequin began to publish medical romances. When the company's chief editor died the following year, Bonnycastle's wife took over his responsibilities. Mary Bonnycastle enjoyed reading the romance novels of British publisher Mills & Boon and believed there was a market for their books in Canada and the United States. Her idea led to the most important decision in the company's history with the 1957 deal that saw Harlequin become the exclusive North American distributor for Mills & Boon romance novels.

== Community activity ==
Aside from his successful publishing business, Bonnycastle was active in his Winnipeg community. He served as President of the Winnipeg Chamber of Commerce, was appointed the first chairman of the Metropolitan Corporation of Greater Winnipeg, and was named the first person to serve as Chancellor of the University of Winnipeg. On a national level, he joined the board of Ducks Unlimited Canada and would serve as its President, Chairman of the Board of Directors and as Chairman of the Executive Committee.

Bonnycastle died in 1968 as a result of a heart attack moments after docking his floatplane at a hunting lodge on Long Island Bay in the southern section of Lake Winnipegosis. His son, Richard Jr., assumed control of Harlequin Enterprises, building it into a major international publishing force.
