= Alfred Carroll =

Canadian politician

Alfred Henry Carroll (March 2, 1846 – June 9, 1924) was a politician in Manitoba, Canada. He served in the Legislative Assembly of Manitoba from 1903 to 1914, as a member of the Conservative Party.

== Early life ==
Carroll was born in the township of West Zorra, Oxford County, Canada West (now Ontario), the son of Daniel Carroll. He was educated at Woodstock, and first worked in the lumbering trade in Virginia. Carroll next was a merchant in Walkerton, Ontario.

== Career ==
He was first elected to the Manitoba legislature in the 1903 provincial election, defeating Liberal candidate John Watson by twelve votes in South Brandon. The Conservatives won this election, and Carroll served in the legislature as a backbench supporter of Rodmond Roblin's administration.

He was re-elected by nine votes in the 1907 election, and by ten votes in 1910. He did not seek re-election in 1914.

== Personal life ==
He married Mary Ellen Dent in 1877. In 1881, he came to Manitoba, where he was a farmer. Carroll served as a councillor and reeve for the Rural Municipality of Oakland. In religion, he was a member of the Church of England.

== Death ==
In 1915, Carroll moved to Beachville, Ontario, where he died at the age of 78.
