= Winnipeg West (provincial electoral district) =

Defunct provincial electoral district in Manitoba, Canada

Winnipeg West is an historical provincial electoral district in Manitoba, Canada. It was created for the 1907 provincial election, and eliminated with the 1914 provincial election.

The constituency was created to provide the city of Winnipeg with a fourth seat in the legislative assembly. Previously, the city had been represented by Winnipeg North, Winnipeg Centre and Winnipeg South.

Winnipeg West's only representative was Thomas Herman Johnson, who sat with the opposition Liberal Party. After the Liberal formed government in 1915, Johnson became a prominent cabinet minister.

The constituency was eliminated in 1914, when Winnipeg's other three seats were redistributed and restructured as two-member constituencies.

== Members of the Legislative Assembly for Winnipeg West ==
| Name | Party | Took office | Left office |
| Thomas Herman Johnson | Liberal-Progressive | 1907 | 1914 |

== See also ==
- List of Manitoba provincial electoral districts
- Canadian provincial electoral districts
