= James Thomas Gordon =

Canadian politician

James Thomas Gordon (December 24, 1859—December 21, 1919) was a politician in Manitoba, Canada. He served in the Legislative Assembly of Manitoba from 1901 to 1910, as a member of the Conservative Party.

Gordon was born in Tweed, Hastings County, Canada West (now Ontario), the son of John Gordon, and was educated at common schools in Tweed. He farmed in Ontario and then moved to Manitoba in 1879, where he was employed in the lumber trade and then dealt in lumber, cattle and wheat. Gordon married Mearle Baldwin in 1885. In 1893, he established the firm of Gordon & Ironsides, which had branches in Fort William, Port Arthur, Kenora, Rainy River, Sudbury, Montreal, Sault Ste. Marie, Regina, Moose Jaw and Saskatoon. Gordon was also president of the Monarch Life Insurance Company, of A. Carruthers & Company, of the Standard Trust Company and of the Royal Securities Company.

Gordon challenged Liberal Premier Thomas Greenway for the Mountain constituency in the 1899 provincial election, and lost by 128 votes. Less than two years later, on December 24, 1901, he was elected to the legislature without opposition in a by-election for Winnipeg South. The Conservatives had won a majority government in the 1899 election, and Gordon served as a backbench supporter of Rodmond Roblin's government. In 1902, he was given the honour of moving the address in reply to the Speech from the Throne.

Gordon was re-elected for Winnipeg South in the 1903 Manitoba general election and 1907 elections, and did not seek re-election in 1910.

He served as a director for the Winnipeg Exhibition Company and was president of the Dominion Exposition of Winnipeg in 1904.

Gordon died at home in Winnipeg at the age of 59.
