= James Argue =

Canadian politician

James Henthorne Argue
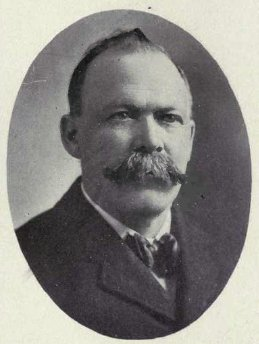

Member of the Legislative Assembly of Manitoba for Avondale
- In office 1899–1914

Personal details
- Born: June 2, 1848 Ireland
- Died: March 4, 1927 (aged 78) Vancouver, British Columbia
- Children: James O. Argue

James Henthorne Argue (2 June 1848 – 4 March 1927) was a politician in Manitoba, Canada. He served in the Legislative Assembly of Manitoba from 1899 to 1914, as a member of the Conservative Party.

Argue was born in Ireland, and received a grammar school education. He worked as a farmer after moving in Manitoba, and served for fifteen years as a local reeve and councillor. In religion, he was a member of the Church of England.

He was first elected to the Manitoba legislature in the 1899 provincial election, defeating Liberal incumbent Thomas Dickey by seventy-seven votes in the Avondale constituency. The Conservatives won this election, and Argue served in the legislature as a government backbencher. He was re-elected in the campaigns of 1903, 1907 and 1910, and did not seek re-election in 1914.

He later moved to Vancouver, where he died in 1927.

His son, James O. Argue, was a Progressive Conservative member of the legislature from 1945 to 1955.
