= John Aikins =

Canadian politician

Personal details
- Born: February 27, 1850
- Died: May 11, 1911 (aged 61) Winnipeg, Manitoba, Canada
- Party: Liberal–Conservative
- Education: Upper Canada College University of Toronto

John Somerset Aikins (February 27, 1850 – May 5, 1911) was a realtor, financier and political figure in Manitoba. He represented Rockwood from 1879 to 1883 in the Legislative Assembly of Manitoba as a Liberal-Conservative.

He was the son of James Cox Aikins and was educated at Upper Canada College and the University of Toronto. He came west in 1875, settling in Winnipeg in 1879. With his brother James Albert, he was involved in the operation of the Manitoba and North West Loan Company, which had been established by his father. In 1887, Aikins married Abby Lemira, the daughter of Charles Carroll Colby. He served as a director for the Winnipeg General Hospital. Aikins died in Winnipeg.
