= Thomas William Taylor =

Canadian politician

Thomas William Taylor (September 6, 1852 – February 24, 1924) was a politician in Manitoba, Canada. He served as the 15th Mayor of Winnipeg, and was a member of the Legislative Assembly of Manitoba from 1900 to 1914. Taylor was a member of the Conservative Party.

Taylor was born in Portsmouth, England, and was educated in London, Ontario. He came to Winnipeg in 1877 and set up a bookbinding business two years letter. Taylor served as a Winnipeg alderman in 1892, was elected mayor 1893, and was re-elected without opposition in 1894. He was also the president of the Manitoba Rifle Association, and of the St. Andrew's Society. In religion, he was a member of the Church of England.

Taylor first ran for the Manitoba legislature in the 1896 provincial election, and lost to Liberal Peter McIntyre by 238 votes in Winnipeg North. He was first elected to the legislature in a by-election, held for Winnipeg Centre on November 1, 1900. Taylor defeated Liberal candidate Robert Muir by 157 votes, and served in the legislature as a backbench supporter of Rodmond Roblin's administration. He was re-elected in the riding of Winnipeg Centre over the Liberal candidate, J.A. McArthur, in the elections of 1903 and 1907.

He was returned to the legislature again in the 1910 election, under controversial circumstances. Taylor defeated Fred Dixon, a Labour candidate supported by the Liberal Party, by a margin of seventy-three votes. The Socialist Party also ran a candidate in Winnipeg Centre, who received ninety-nine votes. Some believe the Conservatives encouraged the Socialist campaign to ensure their own victory.

Despite his municipal experience, Taylor was never appointed to cabinet. He did not seek re-election in 1914, and died ten years later.

Taylor's son-in-law, W.C. Birt, took over the family's bookbinding business after Taylor's death. The Thomas William Taylor printing plant and book bindery remained open in Winnipeg until 1968.

Taylor Avenue in Winnipeg is named for Thomas William Taylor.
