= Martin Jérôme =

Canadian politician

Martin Jérôme (November 23, 1850 – July 22, 1936) was an American-born Métis farmer and political figure in Manitoba. He represented Carillon from 1888 to 1895 and from 1900 to 1903 in the Legislative Assembly of Manitoba as a Liberal.

Born in Pembina, Minnesota Territory, he was educated at the Collège de Saint-Boniface. In 1871, he married Leocadie Carriere. Jérôme served as the first reeve for the Rural Municipality of De Salaberry. He was elected as an independent Liberal when he ran for reelection to the assembly in 1892 and was defeated when he ran for reelection in 1896. Jérôme served for several years as a Canadian immigration agent in France and Belgium. He died in St. Boniface.
