= Edward Brown (Manitoba politician) =

Canadian politician

Provincial Treasurer of Manitoba
- In office May 12, 1915 – August 8, 1922
- Premier: Tobias Norris

Leader of the Manitoba Liberal Party
- In office March 28, 1906 – 1907
- Preceded by: Charles Mickle

Member of the Legislative Assembly of Manitoba
- In office 1915–1922
- Constituency: The Pas

Personal details
- Born: May 23, 1865 Gresham, Bruce County, Canada West
- Died: February 8, 1947 (aged 81) Winnipeg, Manitoba, Canada
- Party: Liberal
- Spouse: Esther Huston (m. 1893)
- Occupation: Merchant, financial broker, politician

Edward Brown (May 23, 1865 – February 8, 1947) was a Manitoba politician. He served briefly as leader of the Manitoba Liberal Party (1906–07), and was later a cabinet minister in Tobias Norris' government (1915–1922).

== Life and career ==
Born in Gresham, Bruce County, Canada West, the son of Edward J. Brown, was educated in St. Catharines. In 1882, he began business as a merchant in Paisley. In 1888, Brown came to Portage la Prairie; he served as mayor there for six years. He married Esther Huston in 1893. In 1909, Brown moved to Winnipeg where he established a financial brokerage firm that he operated until 1942. He was also president of the Canada West Securities Corporation and of the British Northwestern Fire Insurance Company. In 1910, he was listed as one of Winnipeg's 19 millionaires.

Brown made his electoral debut in the provincial campaign of 1903, narrowly losing to Conservative Hugh Armstrong in Portage la Prairie. He subsequently became a leading organizer for the Liberals, and was acclaimed as party leader on March 28, 1906 (replacing Charles Mickle). He was again defeated by Armstrong in the election of 1907, however, and resigned as party leader shortly thereafter. Brown lost a third electoral contest in 1910, falling to Lendrum McMeans in Winnipeg South, 2545 votes to 2496.

Brown finally entered parliament in 1915, running in a deferred election in the northern riding of The Pas. The Liberal party led by Premier Tobias Norris had already won a landslide victory in the rest of the province, and Brown had joined the cabinet as Provincial Treasurer; perhaps not surprisingly, he was unopposed for his riding. Brown held his cabinet position until the Norris government was defeated in 1922. In the election of 1920, he fended off a weak challenge from Labour candidate A. Norgrove.

In 1922, Brown supported efforts to reunite the "Unionist" and "Laurier Liberal" factions of the Liberal Party in Canada and Manitoba (see Wilfrid Laurier). While these efforts were successful, they led to a popular perception that the previously-independent Norris government would henceforth be subservient to the federal Liberals. Opposition parties used this to their advantage in the election of 1922, which the United Farmers of Manitoba won in a landslide.

Brown was not a candidate in 1922, and did not return to political life thereafter.

He died in Winnipeg at the age of 81.

== See also ==
- Politics of Manitoba
