= Carillon (electoral district) =

Defunct provincial electoral district in Manitoba, Canada

Carillon is a former provincial electoral district in Manitoba, Canada. It was established for the 1886 provincial election, and eliminated with the 1969 election. The constituency was predominantly francophone. Albert Prefontaine and his son Edmond represented Carillon for almost all of the period between 1903 and 1962, serving with a variety of parties.

== Members of the Legislative Assembly ==
Assembly	Tenure	Name	Party	Ref.
6th	1886–1888	Roger Marion	Conservative	
7th	1888–1892	Martin Jérôme	Liberal	
8th	1892–1895	Martin Jérôme	Independent Liberal/Opposition	
9th	1896–1899	Roger Marion	Conservative	
10th	1900–1903	Martin Jérôme	Liberal	
11th	1903–1907	Albert Prefontaine	Conservative	
12th	1908–1910	Albert Prefontaine	Conservative	
13th	1911–1914	Albert Prefontaine	Conservative	
14th	1914–1915	Thomas B. Molloy	Liberal	
15th	1916–1920	Albert Prefontaine	Conservative	
16th	1921–1922	Maurice Duprey	Farmer	
17th	1923–1927	Albert Prefontaine	Progressive	
18th	1927–1932	Albert Prefontaine	Progressive	
19th	1933–1935	Albert Prefontaine	Liberal-Progressive	
19th	1935–1936	Edmond Prefontaine	Liberal-Progressive	
20th	1937–1940	Edmond Prefontaine	Liberal-Progressive	
21st	1941–1945	Edmond Prefontaine	Liberal-Progressive	
22nd	1946–1949	Edmond Prefontaine	Liberal-Progressive	
23rd	1950–1953	Edmond Prefontaine	Independent Liberal/Anti-Coalition	
24th	1954–1957	Edmond Prefontaine	Liberal-Progressive	
25th	1958–1959	Edmond Prefontaine	Liberal-Progressive	
26th	1959–1962	Edmond Prefontaine	Liberal-Progressive	
27th	1963–1966	Leonard Barkman	Liberal	
28th	1966–1969	Leonard Barkman	Liberal	

== Electoral results ==
1966 Manitoba general election
Party	Candidate	Votes	%	±%
Liberal	Leonard Barkman	2,352	63.83	
Progressive Conservative	John Blatz	1,217	33.03	
New Democratic	Elmer Reimer	116	3.12	
Total valid votes		3,685	100.00	
Rejected and discarded votes		59		
Turnout		3,744	59.84	
Electors on the lists		6,257		

== See also ==
- List of Manitoba provincial electoral districts
- Canadian provincial electoral districts
