= David McNaught =

Canadian politician

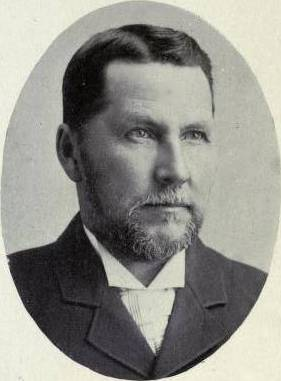

Member of the Legislative Assembly of Manitoba for Saskatchewan
- In office 1892–1899

Personal details
- Born: May 28, 1839; Penpont, Dumfriesshire, Scotland
- Died: August 10, 1922 (aged 83); Rapid City, Manitoba

David McNaught (May 28, 1839 – August 10, 1922) was a Scottish-born veterinarian and political figure in Manitoba. He represented Saskatchewan from 1892 to 1899 in the Legislative Assembly of Manitoba as a Liberal.

He was born in Penpont, Dumfriesshire, the son of John McNaught, and was educated in Fergus, Canada West and in Brantford and at the Ontario Veterinary College. McNaught was subsequently an examiner for the veterinary college for five years. In 1865, he married Rebecca Ross. McNaught practised in Seaforth, Ontario for a number of years before coming to Rapid City, Manitoba in 1881. He served as mayor of Rapid City.

McNaught later died of influenza in Rapid City.
