= David Jackson (Manitoba politician) =

MLA for Hamiota
- In office 1903 to 1907

Personal details
- Born: March 7, 1852 Hemmingford, Canada East (now Quebec)
- Died: December 19, 1925 (aged 73) Vancouver, British Columbia
- Party: Manitoba Liberal Party

David Jackson (March 7, 1852 – December 19, 1925) was a farmer and political figure in Manitoba. He represented Hamiota from 1903 to 1907 in the Legislative Assembly of Manitoba as a Liberal.

He was born in Hemmingford, Canada East, the son of William Jackson and Mary Scott. Jackson was married twice: first to Mary A. Wilson in 1875 and then to Fannie Dennison in 1882. He died in Vancouver in 1925.
