= Richard Henry Bonnycastle =

Lieutenant-Colonel Sir Richard Henry Bonnycastle
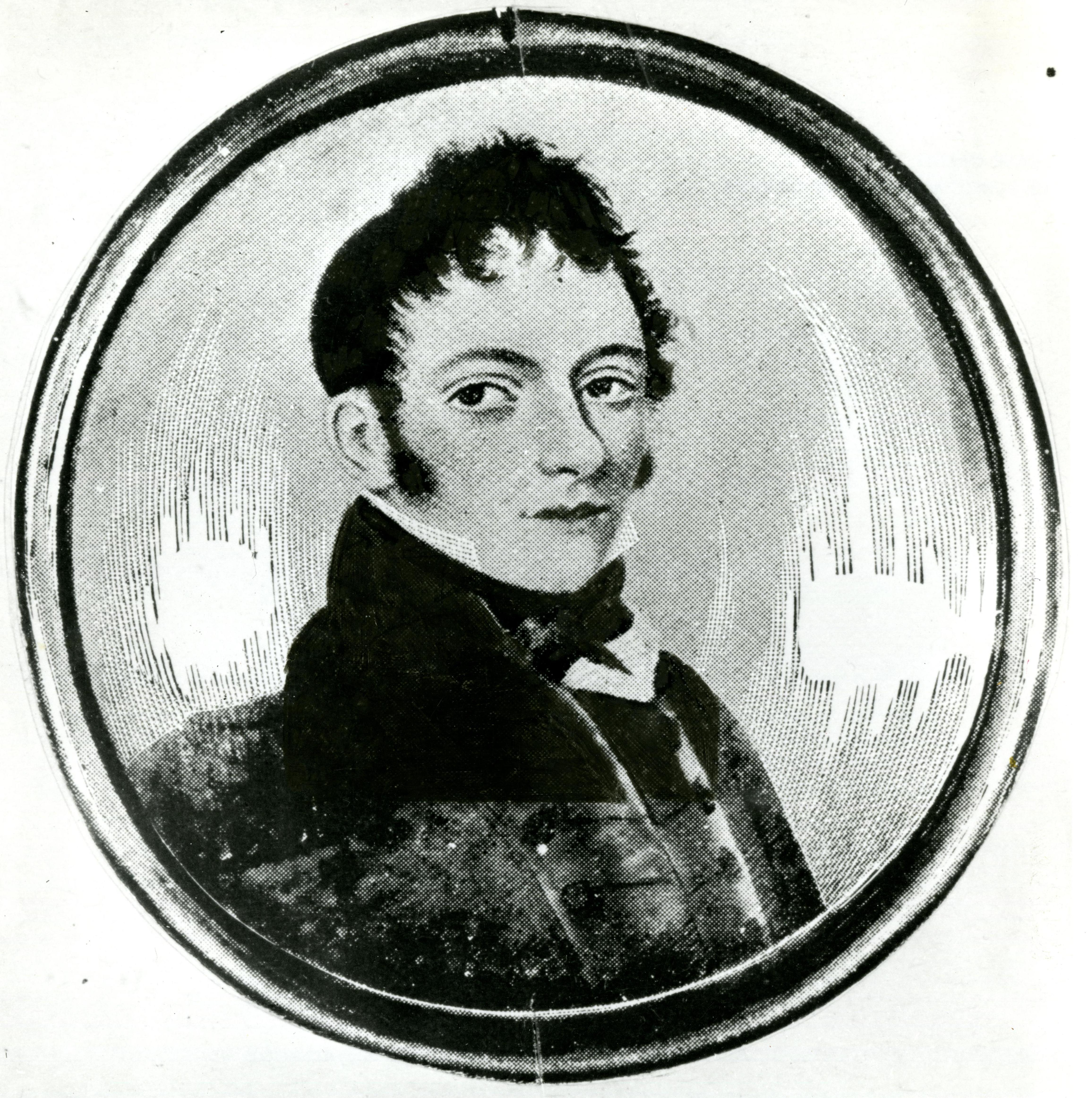
- Portrait by Henry J. Morgan
- Born: 30 September 1791
- Died: 3 November 1847 (aged 56)

Lieutenant-Colonel Sir Richard Henry Bonnycastle (30 September 1791 – 3 November 1847) was an officer of the British army active in Upper Canada.

== Life ==
Lieutenant-Colonel Sir Richard Henry Bonnycastle was the son of Professor John Bonnycastle, and was born in 1791. He studied at the Royal Military Academy, Woolwich, as a cadet, and passed out as a second lieutenant of the royal engineers 28 September 1808, becoming a first lieutenant in the following year. He served at the siege of Flushing in 1809, and in the American campaigns of 1812–14, during which he was present at the capture of Fort Castine, and the occupation of the part of the state of Maine east of the Penobscot, and was commanding engineer at the construction of the extensive works thrown up by the British on the Castine peninsula. He attained the rank of captain in 1814, in which year he married the daughter of Captain W. Johnstone. Subsequently, he served with the army of occupation in France.

As commanding royal engineer in Upper Canada, he rendered very important services during the Canadian rebellion in 1837–39, particularly in February 1838, when, at the head of a force of militia and volunteers, in the absence of regular troops, he defeated the designs of the insurgents at Napanee, and the brigands at Hickory Island, for an attack on the city of Kingston. For these services he was knighted. In his capacity as a military engineer, Bonnycastle oversaw the fortification of Fort Henry in modern Kingston, Ontario. He was afterwards commanding engineer in Newfoundland.

He became a brevet-major in 1837, a regimental lieutenant-colonel in 1840, and retired from the service in 1847. He died in 1848.

== Family ==
Through his son, Henry William John Bonnycastle (1813–1888) would come a prominent Bonnycastle family of Canadian politicians and adventurers and the founder of Harlequin Enterprises, the world's largest publisher of romance novels.

== Works ==
- Richard Henry Bonnycastle (1849). Canada and the Canadians, Volume I. London.
- Richard Henry Bonnycastle (1849). Canada and the Canadians, Volume II. London.
