= Allen Edwin Thompson =

Canadian politician

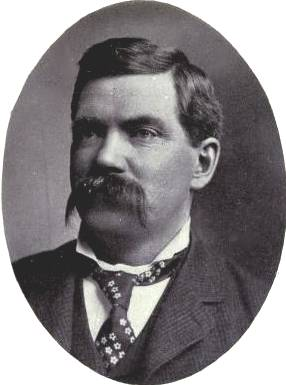

Member of the Legislative Assembly of Manitoba for Souris
- In office 1900–1903

Member of the Legislative Assembly of Manitoba for Arthur
- In office 1903–1907

Personal details
- Born: June 9, 1855; Switzerville, Canada West
- Died: February 12, 1910 (aged 54); Los Angeles, California, US

Allen Edwin Thompson (June 9, 1855 – February 12, 1910) was a farmer, butcher, cattle trader and political figure in Manitoba. He represented Souris from 1900 to 1903 and Arthur from 1903 to 1907 in the Legislative Assembly of Manitoba as a Conservative.

He was born in Switzerville, Ontario. Thompson came to Manitoba in 1882, settling near Deloraine. In 1891, he moved to Melita. Thompson was married twice: first to Lydia Jane Reese in 1883 and then to Emma Jane Burwash in 1898. In 1906, he moved to Vancouver, British Columbia. Thompson moved to Los Angeles, California in December 1909 and died there a few months later.

His grave is located in the Mountain View Cemetery in Vancouver.
