= Charles Adams (Manitoba politician) =

Canadian politician

Charles Adams (February 27, 1858 – April 2, 1931) was a harness maker and political figure in Manitoba. He represented Brandon City from 1893 to 1899 in the Legislative Assembly of Manitoba as a Liberal.

He was born in Norwich township, Canada West, the son of H.J. Adams, and was educated in Oxford County and at Dundas Collegiate Institute. He learned the harness-making trade from his father and began business in Oxford County. Adams married Clara Filey in 1877. In 1881, he moved to Manitoba, settling in Brandon. Adams served on Brandon town council and was mayor in 1887. He was elected to the Manitoba assembly in an 1893 by-election held after the results of the election in 1892 were declared void and then was elected again in an 1894 by-election. Adams was reelected in 1896 and then was defeated when he ran for reelection in 1899.

The Adams Brothers Harness Company later moved its headquarters to Toronto and had branch offices in Winnipeg, Saskatoon, Edmonton and Calgary. Adams served as president and general manager of the company.

He died of arteriosclerosis at his home in Toronto at the age of 73.

The Adams Brothers Harness Manufacturing Company Building in Toronto has been designed as a heritage building under the Ontario Heritage Act.
