= Charles Mickle =

Canadian politician

- Born: July 22, 1849
- Died: November 10, 1919 (aged 70)
- Occupation: Politician

Charles Julius Mickle (July 22, 1849 in Stratford, Canada West, now Ontario – November 10, 1919 in Minnedosa, Manitoba) was a politician in Manitoba, Canada. He was a provincial cabinet minister for three years and on two occasions served as the leader of the Liberal Party in the Legislative Assembly of Manitoba.

Mickle trained as a lawyer and was admitted to the Ontario bar in 1872. He practiced law in Ontario for ten years before moving to Manitoba. He was first elected to the Manitoba legislature for the constituency of Birtle in the 1888 provincial election, as a supporter of Liberal Premier Thomas Greenway. He was re-elected in the 1892 campaign and won by acclamation in 1896.

In 1889, he married Mary A. Ross.

In November 1896, Mickle entered Greenway's cabinet as Provincial Secretary. He held this position until the resignation of the Greenway ministry in January 1900. The Liberals had narrowly lost the election of 1899, although Mickle was re-elected in Birtle.

Mickle was also one of only nine Liberals to be re-elected in the party's electoral debacle of 1903. The party won only nine seats, but Mickle scored a surprisingly easy victory (584 votes to 293) over Conservative John Leich. When Greenway re-entered federal politics in 1904, Mickle was chosen to replace him as parliamentary leader.

Mickle served as the de facto party leader until March 28, 1906, when a provincial Liberal convention acclaimed Edward Brown for the position. Brown was unable to win a seat in the election which followed, and Mickle was again chosen as parliamentary leader in January 1908.

He left politics in 1909, having been appointed a County Court Judge.
