= Arthur (electoral district) =

Defunct provincial electoral district in Manitoba, Canada

Arthur is a former provincial electoral district of Manitoba, Canada. It was created in 1903, and was eliminated by redistribution in 1989, when its territory was combined with that of the neighbouring Virden riding to create the new constituency of Arthur-Virden.

The riding was located in the province's southwestern tip, and was primarily agrarian. From 1953 until its abolition, it was a safe seat for the Progressive Conservative Party.

== Members of the Legislative Assembly ==
Name	Party	Took office	Left office
Allen Thompson	Cons	1903	1907
John Williams	Lib	1907	1910
Amos Lyle	Cons	1910	1914
John Williams	Lib	1914	1922
Duncan McLeod	Prog	1922	1932
	Lib-Prog	1932	1936
John Pitt	Lib-Prog	1936	1953
J. Arthur Ross	PC	1953	1958
John Cobb	PC	1958	1962
J. Douglas Watt	PC	1962	1977
James Downey	PC	1977	1990

== See also ==
- List of Manitoba provincial electoral districts
- Canadian provincial electoral districts
