= Edward Briggs (politician) =

Canadian politician (1854–1941)

Edward Briggs (February 25, 1854 – December 14, 1941) was a farmer and political figure in Manitoba. He represented Deloraine from 1903 to 1907 in the Legislative Assembly of Manitoba as a Conservative.

He was born in Bayfield, Canada West, the son of James E. Briggs and Anna Bennett Hayter, and was educated in Huron County. In 1877, he married Ellen Robinson. Briggs was employed in the boot and shoe business in Huron County until 1882, when he came west to Manitoba, settling on a homestead south of Hartney. He served as municipal assessor and also served on the council for the Rural Municipality of Cameron. He was president of the Farmers' Institute and of the North-West Auctioneers' Association. Briggs was defeated when he ran for reelection to the Manitoba assembly in 1907.

He died in Hartney at the age of 87.
