= Killarney (electoral district) =

Defunct provincial electoral district in Manitoba, Canada

Killarney is a former provincial electoral district in Manitoba, Canada.

It was created for the 1888 provincial election, and abolished with the 1958 election.

== Members of the Legislative Assembly ==
Killarney elected members to the Legislative Assembly of Manitoba from 1888 to 1953. The members it elected were:

Name	Party	Took office	Left office
Finlay Young	Liberal	1888	1899
George Lawrence	Conservative	1899	1915
Samuel Hayden	Liberal	1915	1920
Samuel Fletcher	Farmer	1920	1922
Andrew E. Foster	Progressive	1922	1927
John Laughlin	Conservative	1927	1932
Andrew E. Foster	Liberal–Progressive	1932	1936
John Laughlin	Conservative	1936	1941
Abram Harrison	Conservative	1941	1943
Abram Harrison	Progressive Conservative	1943	1958

== See also ==
- List of Manitoba provincial electoral districts
- Canadian provincial electoral districts
