= Rockwood (electoral district) =

Defunct provincial electoral district in Manitoba, Canada

Rockwood was a provincial electoral district in Manitoba, Canada. The district was created with the province's first redistribution in 1874, and changed by the 1955 redistribution in advance of the 1958 provincial election. It was merged with what was left of the old Iberville district to form Rockwood-Iberville.

== Members of the Legislative Assembly ==
Rockwood elected members to the Legislative Assembly of Manitoba from 1874 to 1953. The members it elected were:

Name	Party	Took office	Left office
William F. Luxton	Opposition	1874	1875
William F. Luxton	Government Supporter	1875	1878
Thomas Lusted	Opposition	1878	1879
Thomas Lusted	Government Supporter	1879	1879
John Aikins	Government Supporter	1879	1883
Samuel Jackson	Independent Liberal	1883	1888
Samuel Jackson	Liberal	1888	1899
Isaac Riley	Conservative	1899	1915
Arthur Lobb	Liberal	1915	1920
William McKinnell	Farmer	1920	1922
William McKinnell	Progressive	1922	1932
William McKinnell	Liberal–Progressive	1932	1936
Mungo Turnbull Lewis	Conservative	1936	1940
Mungo Turnbull Lewis	Independent (Coalition)	1940	1945
W.J. Campbell	Progressive Conservative (Coalition)	1945	1949
Robert Bend	Independent PC (Coalition)	1949	1953
Robert Bend	Liberal–Progressive	1953	1958

== See also ==
- List of Manitoba provincial electoral districts
- Canadian provincial electoral districts
