= 1899 Manitoba general election =

- December 7, 1899

40 seats of the Legislative Assembly of Manitoba 21 seats needed for a majority
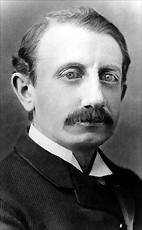

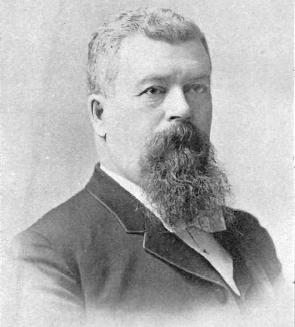
	First party	Second party
Leader	Hugh John Macdonald	Thomas Greenway
Party	Conservative	Liberal
Leader since	1897	1882
Leader's seat	Winnipeg South	Mountain
Last election	5	31
Seats won	23	17
Seat change	▲18	▼14
Popular vote	49.8%	49.5%
Swing	▲9.6pp	▼0.2pp
Premier before election
Thomas Greenway
Liberal
Premier after election
Hugh John Macdonald
Conservative

The 1899 Manitoba general election was held on December 7, 1899. The Conservative Party, led by Sir Hugh John Macdonald, defeated the incumbent Liberal government, led by Premier Thomas Greenway.

== Results ==
Party	Party Leader	# of candidates	Seats			Popular Vote (Note: The Conservative results include both those in the Cons. column and the Other-Cons. column.)		
Party	Party Leader	# of candidates	1896	Elected	% Change	#	%	Change (pp)
Conservative	Hugh John Macdonald	40	5	23	+360%	23,431	49.8%	+9.6
Liberal	Thomas Greenway	40	31	17	-45.2%	23,302	49.5%	-0.2
Independents	N/A	3	0	0	N/A	343	0.7%	-1.3
Total		83	40	40		47,076	100%	

Popular vote
Conservative	49.8%
Liberal	49.5%
Others	0.7%

Seats
Conservative	57.5%
Liberal	42.5%
