= 14th Manitoba Legislature =

The members of the 14th Manitoba Legislature were elected in the Manitoba general election held in July 1914. The legislature sat from September 15, 1914, to July 16, 1915.

The Conservatives led by Rodmond Roblin formed the government.

Tobias Norris of the Liberal Party was Leader of the Opposition.

The Roblin government was forced to resign in 1915 after a royal commission initiated by the Lieutenant Governor found evidence of corruption in the awarding of contracts for the construction of new legislative buildings. The house was dissolved and a new election was held in August 1915.

James Johnson served as speaker for the assembly.

There were two sessions of the 14th Legislature:

Session	Start	End
1st	September 15, 1914	September 18, 1914
2nd	February 10, 1915	April 1, 1915

Douglas Colin Cameron was Lieutenant Governor of Manitoba.

== Members of the Assembly ==
The following members were elected to the assembly in 1914:

Member	Electoral district	Party	First elected / previously elected	No.# of term(s)
John Williams	Arthur	Liberal	1907, 1914	2nd term*
John Thomas Haig	Assiniboia	Conservative	1914	1st term
James H. Howden	Beautiful Plains	Conservative	1903	4th term
George Malcolm	Birtle	Liberal	1909	3rd term
George R. Coldwell	Brandon City	Conservative	1907	3rd term
Thomas B. Molloy	Carillon	Liberal	1914	1st term
George R. Ray	Churchill (Note: Election held August 1, 1914)	Conservative	1914	1st term
George Steel	Cypress	Conservative	1899	5th term
William Buchanan	Dauphin	Conservative	1914	1st term
Robert Stirton Thornton	Deloraine	Liberal	1907, 1914	2nd term*
Rodmond Roblin	Dufferin	Conservative	1888, (Note: Dufferin North) 1896	8th term*
Harry Mewhirter	Elmwood	Conservative	1914	1st term
David Henry McFadden	Emerson	Conservative	1892, 1910	7th term*
Samuel Hughes	Gilbert Plains	Conservative	1910	2nd term
Sveinn Thorvaldson	Gimli	Conservative	1914	1st term
James William Armstrong	Gladstone	Liberal	1907	3rd term
James Breakey	Glenwood	Liberal	1914	1st term
Hugh Armstrong	Grand Rapids	Conservative	1892, (Note: Woodlands) 1902, (Note: Portage la Prairie) 1914	6th term*
John Henry McConnell	Hamiota	Liberal	1914	1st term
Aimé Bénard	Iberville	Conservative	1907	3rd term
Walter Humphries Montague	Kildonan and St. Andrews	Conservative	1913	2nd term
George Lawrence	Killarney	Conservative	1899	5th term
John J. Garland	Lakeside	Conservative	1914	1st term
Tobias Norris	Lansdowne	Liberal	1896, 1907	5th term*
Jean-Baptiste Lauzon	La Verendrye	Conservative	1896, 1907, 1914	3rd term*
James Morrow	Manitou	Conservative	1911	2nd term
George Grierson	Minnedosa	Liberal	1914	1st term
Valentine Winkler	Morden and Rhineland	Liberal	1892	7th term
Jacques Parent	Morris	Conservative	1914	1st term
James Bryson Baird	Mountain	Liberal	1907	3rd term
John Graham	Norfolk	Liberal	1914	1st term
Ewan McPherson	Portage la Prairie	Liberal	1914	1st term
Frederic Newton	Roblin	Conservative	1911	2nd term
Isaac Riley	Rockwood	Conservative	1899	5th term
Donald Cromwell McDonald	Russell	Liberal	1914	1st term
Joseph Bernier	St. Boniface	Conservative	1900, 1907	4th term*
Donald A. Ross	St. Clements	Liberal	1907	3rd term
Edmund L. Taylor	St. George	Conservative	1913	2nd term
Joseph Hamelin	Ste. Rose	Conservative	1914	1st term
William Henry Sims	Swan River	Liberal	1914	1st term
Robert Orok	The Pas	Conservative	1912	2nd term
James Johnson	Turtle Mountain	Conservative	1897	6th term
George Clingan	Virden	Liberal	1914	1st term
Thomas Herman Johnson	Winnipeg Centre A	Liberal	1907	3rd term
Fred Dixon	Winnipeg Centre B	Independent	1914	1st term
Joseph P. Foley	Winnipeg North A	Conservative	1914	1st term
Daniel McLean	Winnipeg North B	Conservative	1914	1st term
Albert Hudson	Winnipeg South A	Liberal	1914	1st term
William Parrish	Winnipeg South B	Liberal	1914	1st term

== By-elections ==
None
