= 15th Manitoba Legislature =

The members of the 15th Manitoba Legislature were elected in the Manitoba general election held in August 1915. The legislature sat from January 6, 1916, to March 27, 1920.

The Liberal Party led by Tobias Norris formed the government.

Albert Prefontaine of the Conservatives was Leader of the Opposition.

On January 16, 1916, a bill was passed to amend the Manitoba Election Act to grant women the right to vote. Manitoba became the first Canadian province where women were allowed to vote and hold office.

In a referendum held on March 13, 1916, the province's voters supported prohibition. On June 1, the Manitoba Temperance Act came into effect, which banned the sale of liquor in the province, except by pharmacists for medical purposes. However, bringing alcohol into the province for personal use or for wholesale outside the province was still legal.

Also in 1916, the Workers Compensation Act was passed, which established the Workers Compensation Board of Manitoba. The act established an employer-funded compensation system for work-related injuries or illness and, in exchange, employers were granted protection against lawsuits by workers for these occurrences.

In 1918, a Minimum Wage Act was passed. Manitoba and British Columbia were the first provinces in Canada to introduce minimum wage legislation. In 1921, the minimum hourly wage in Manitoba was $0.25. Up until 1931, the minimum wage only applied to female workers.

James Bryson Baird served as speaker for the assembly.

There were five sessions of the 15th Legislature:

Session	Start	End
1st	January 6, 1916	April 1, 1916
2nd	January 11, 1917	March 9, 1917
3rd	January 17, 1918	March 6, 1918
4th	January 21, 1919	March 14, 1919
5th	January 22, 1920	March 27, 1920

Douglas Colin Cameron was Lieutenant Governor of Manitoba until August 3, 1916, when James Albert Manning Aikins became lieutenant governor.

== Members of the Assembly ==
The following members were elected to the assembly in 1915:

Member	Electoral district	Party	First elected / previously elected	No.# of term(s)
John Williams	Arthur	Liberal	1907, 1914	3rd term*
John W. Wilton	Assiniboia	Liberal	1915	1st term
William Robertson Wood	Beautiful Plains	Liberal	1915	1st term
George Malcolm	Birtle	Liberal	1909	4th term
Stephen Emmett Clement	Brandon City	Liberal	1915	1st term
Albert Prefontaine	Carillon	Conservative	1903, 1915	4th term*
Andrew Watson Myles	Cypress	Liberal	1915	1st term
William Harrington	Dauphin	Liberal	1915	1st term
Robert Stirton Thornton	Deloraine	Liberal	1907, 1914	3rd term*
Edward August	Dufferin	Liberal	1915	1st term
Thomas Glendenning Hamilton	Elmwood	Liberal	1915	1st term
John David Baskerville	Emerson	Liberal	1915	1st term
William Findlater	Gilbert Plains	Liberal	1915	1st term
Taras Ferley	Gimli	Liberal	1915	1st term
James William Armstrong	Gladstone	Liberal	1907	4th term
James Breakey	Glenwood	Liberal	1914	2nd term
John Henry McConnell	Hamiota	Liberal	1914	2nd term
Aimé Bénard	Iberville	Conservative	1907	4th term
Arthur Boivin (1917)	Iberville	Conservative	1917	1st term
George Prout	Kildonan and St. Andrews	Liberal	1915	1st term
Samuel Hayden	Killarney	Liberal	1915	1st term
Charles Duncan McPherson	Lakeside	Liberal	1910, 1915	2nd term*
Tobias Norris	Lansdowne	Liberal	1896, 1907	6th term*
Philippe Talbot	La Verendrye	Liberal	1915	1st term
Philippe Talbot	La Verendrye	Independent	1915	1st term
George Thomas Armstrong	Manitou	Liberal	1915	1st term
George Grierson	Minnedosa	Liberal	1914	2nd term
Valentine Winkler	Morden and Rhineland	Liberal	1892	8th term
Jacques Parent	Morris	Conservative	1914	2nd term
James Bryson Baird	Mountain	Liberal	1907	4th term
John Graham	Norfolk	Liberal	1914	2nd term
Ewan McPherson	Portage la Prairie	Liberal	1914	2nd term
Frederic Newton	Roblin	Conservative	1911	3rd term
William James Westwood (1917)	Roblin	Independent Liberal	1917	1st term
Arthur Lobb	Rockwood	Liberal	1915	1st term
John Morrison	Rupertsland	Liberal	1916	1st term
William Wilber Wilfred Wilson	Russell	Liberal	1915	1st term
Joseph Dumas	St. Boniface	Liberal	1915	1st term
Donald A. Ross	St. Clements	Liberal	1907	4th term
Skuli Sigfusson	St. George	Liberal	1915	1st term
Joseph Hamelin	Ste. Rose	Conservative	1914	2nd term
William Henry Sims	Swan River	Liberal	1914	2nd term
Edward Brown	The Pas (Note: Election held August 25, 1915)	Liberal	1915	1st term
George William McDonald	Turtle Mountain	Liberal	1915	1st term
George Clingan	Virden	Liberal	1914	2nd term
Thomas Herman Johnson	Winnipeg Centre A	Liberal	1907	4th term
Fred Dixon	Winnipeg Centre B	Independent	1914	2nd term
Fred Dixon	Winnipeg Centre B	Labour	1914	2nd term
Robert Newton Lowery	Winnipeg North A	Liberal	1915	1st term
Richard Rigg	Winnipeg North B	Social Democratic	1915	1st term
Robert Jacob (1918)	Winnipeg North B	Liberal	1918	1st term
Albert Hudson	Winnipeg South A	Liberal	1914	2nd term
William Parrish	Winnipeg South B	Liberal	1914	2nd term

== By-elections ==
By-elections were held to replace members for various reasons:

Electoral district	Member elected	Affiliation	Election date	Reason
Rupertsland	John Morrison	Independent-Liberal	September 16, 1916	New riding created
Iberville	Arthur Boivin	Conservative	November 1, 1917	A Bénard named to Senate of Canada
Roblin	William James Westwood	Independent-Liberal	November 19, 1917	F Newton resigned seat
Killarney	George Grierson	Liberal	November 30, 1917	G Grierson appointed Minister of Public Works
Winnipeg North B	Robert Jacob	Union	January 15, 1918	R Rigg ran for federal seat
