= 13th Manitoba Legislature =

1911-1914 meeting of the Manitoba legislature

The members of the 13th Manitoba Legislature were elected in the Manitoba general election held in July 1910. The legislature sat from February 9, 1911, to June 15, 1914.

The Conservatives led by Rodmond Roblin formed the government.

Tobias Norris of the Liberal Party was Leader of the Opposition.

James Johnson served as speaker for the assembly.

There were four sessions of the 13th Legislature:

Session	Start	End
1st	February 9, 1911	March 24, 1911
2nd	February 22, 1912	April 6, 1912
3rd	January 9, 1913	February 15, 1913
4th	December 11, 1913	February 20, 1914

Daniel Hunter McMillan was Lieutenant Governor of Manitoba until August 1, 1911, when Douglas Colin Cameron became lieutenant governor.

== Members of the Assembly ==
The following members were elected to the assembly in 1910:

Member	Electoral district	Party	First elected / previously elected	No.# of term(s)
Amos Lyle	Arthur	Conservative	1910	1st term
Aimé Bénard	Assiniboia	Conservative	1907	2nd term
James Argue	Avondale	Conservative	1899	4th term
James H. Howden	Beautiful Plains	Conservative	1903	3rd term
George Malcolm	Birtle	Liberal	1909	2nd term
George R. Coldwell	Brandon City	Conservative	1907	2nd term
Alfred Carroll	Brandon South	Conservative	1903	3rd term
Albert Prefontaine	Carillon	Conservative	1903	3rd term
George Steel	Cypress	Conservative	1899	4th term
James G. Harvey	Dauphin	Conservative	1910	1st term
John C. W. Reid	Deloraine	Conservative	1910	1st term
Rodmond Roblin	Dufferin	Conservative	1888, (Note: Dufferin North) 1896	7th term*
David Henry McFadden	Emerson	Conservative	1892, 1910	6th term*
Samuel Hughes	Gilbert Plains	Conservative	1910	1st term
Baldwin Baldwinson	Gimli	Conservative	1899, 1910	3rd term*
Edmund L. Taylor (1913)	Gimli	Conservative	1913	1st term
James William Armstrong	Gladstone	Liberal	1907	2nd term
William Ferguson	Hamiota	Conservative	1899, (Note: Saskatchewan) 1907	3rd term*
Orton Grain	Kildonan and St. Andrews	Conservative	1899, 1907	3rd term*
Walter Humphries Montague (1913)	Kildonan and St. Andrews	Conservative	1913	1st term
George Lawrence	Killarney	Conservative	1899	4th term
Charles Duncan McPherson	Lakeside	Liberal	1910	1st term
Tobias Norris	Lansdowne	Liberal	1896, 1907	4th term*
William Molloy	La Verendrye	Liberal	1910	1st term
Robert Rogers	Manitou	Conservative	1899	4th term
James Morrow (1911)	Manitou	Conservative	1911	1st term
John W. Thompson	Minnedosa	Liberal	1910	1st term
Benjamin McConnell	Morden	Liberal	1907	2nd term
Colin Campbell	Morris	Conservative	1899	4th term
James Bryson Baird	Mountain	Liberal	1907	2nd term
Robert Fern Lyons	Norfolk	Conservative	1892, 1899	5th term*
Hugh Armstrong	Portage la Prairie	Conservative	1892, (Note: Woodlands) 1902	5th term*
Valentine Winkler	Rhineland	Liberal	1892	6th term
Isaac Riley	Rockwood	Conservative	1899	4th term
Angus Bonnycastle	Russell	Conservative	1907	2nd term
Frederic Newton (1911)	Russell	Conservative	1911	1st term
Joseph Bernier	St. Boniface	Conservative	1900, 1907	3rd term*
Donald A. Ross	Springfield	Liberal	1907	2nd term
Daniel D. McDonald	Swan River	Liberal	1910	1st term
Robert Orok	The Pas	Conservative	1912	1st term
James Johnson	Turtle Mountain	Conservative	1897	5th term
Harvey Simpson	Virden	Conservative	1909	2nd term
Thomas William Taylor	Winnipeg Centre	Conservative	1900	4th term
Solomon Hart Green	Winnipeg North	Liberal	1910	1st term
Lendrum McMeans	Winnipeg South	Conservative	1910	1st term
Thomas Herman Johnson	Winnipeg West	Liberal	1907	2nd term

== By-elections ==
By-elections were held to replace members for various reasons:

Electoral district	Member elected	Affiliation	Election date	Reason
Russell	Frederic Newton	Conservative	February 4, 1911	AL Bonnycastle resigned after recount
Killarney	George Lawrence	Conservative	October 23, 1911	G Lawrence appointed Minister of Agriculture
Manitou	James Morrow	Conservative	October 31, 1911	R Rogers named to Canadian cabinet
The Pas	Robert Orok	Conservative	October 22, 1912	New riding created
Gimli	Edmund L. Taylor	Conservative	May 12, 1913	B Baldwinson named deputy Provincial Secretary
St. Boniface	Joseph Bernier	Conservative	May 21, 1913	J Bernier appointed Provincial Secretary
Kildonan and St. Andrews	Walter Humphries Montague	Conservative	November 29, 1913	O Grain resigned
