= Peter McIntyre =

Peter McIntyre or MacIntyre may refer to:

- Peter McIntyre (artist) (1910–1995), official New Zealand war artist during the Second World War
- Peter MacIntyre (colonist) (1783–1842), Scottish colonist of Australia
- Peter McIntyre (cricketer) (born 1966), former Australian cricketer
- Peter McIntyre (Australian footballer) (born 1967), former Australian rules footballer
- Peter McIntyre (footballer, born 1875), (1875–1938) Scottish footballer
- Peter McIntyre (architect) (born 1928), Australian architect and educator
- Peter McIntyre (bishop) (1818–1891), bishop of the Roman Catholic Diocese of Charlottetown
- Peter McIntyre (Manitoba politician) (1854–1930), postmaster and politician in Manitoba, Canada
- Peter Adolphus McIntyre (1840–1910), Canadian politician
- Peter McIntyre (judge), Canadian judge
