= George Ray =

George Ray may refer to:

- George Augustus Ray (1819–1893), Wisconsin State Assemblyman
- George H. Ray (1847–1910), Speaker of the Wisconsin State Assembly
- George W. Ray (1844–1925), United States Representative from New York
- George R. Ray (1869–1935), politician in Manitoba, Canada
- George Ray (footballer, born 1993), English-born Welsh footballer
- George Ray (1920s footballer), English footballer
