= George Renouf =

Canadian politician (1878–1961)

Member of the Legislative Assembly of Manitoba for Swan River
- In office 1932–1958
- Preceded by: Andrew McCleary
- Succeeded by: Albert H. C. Corbett

Personal details
- Born: November 12, 1878 Jersey, Channel Islands
- Died: February 20, 1961 (aged 82) Winnipeg, Manitoba, Canada
- Party: Progressive Conservative Party of Manitoba

George Poddester Renouf (November 12, 1878 – February 20, 1961) was a politician in Manitoba, Canada. He served in the Legislative Assembly of Manitoba from 1932 to 1958, initially as a Conservative and later as a Progressive Conservative, once the party changed its name.

Born at Jersey in 1878, Renouf was educated at a private school in Jersey, and came to Canada in 1896, moving to Winnipeg in 1898 and to Bowsman the following year. In 1906, he married Elsie Marie Le Salleur, also from Jersey. He worked as a farmer, and was reeve of the Minitonas municipality from 1921 to 1932. He was also president of the Minitonas Red Cross. Renouf farmed in the Swan River valley until 1955.

He was first elected to the Manitoba legislature in the 1932 provincial election, defeating independent candidate S. Einarson by 419 votes in the Swan River constituency. He was re-elected in the 1936 election, defeating Liberal-Progressive D. Baldwin by only twelve votes.

The Conservative Party, which was Manitoba's official opposition in the 1930s, joined the Liberal-Progressives in a coalition government in 1940. Renouf became a government backbencher, and was easily returned in the 1941 election. In the 1945 election, he defeated CCF candidate Robert Niven by over one thousand votes.

Renouf appears to have left the Progressive Conservative caucus and the government coalition in 1948, after Douglas Campbell was chosen as Premier of Manitoba. In the 1949 provincial election, he ran as a Conservative opposing the coalition. Easily re-elected, he served as opposition house leader for the start of the parliament which followed.

The Progressive Conservatives left the coalition government in 1950. Renouf rejoined the party caucus, and was re-elected one final time in 1953. He did not seek re-election in 1958, in which the Progressive Conservatives won a minority government under Dufferin Roblin. Renouf seems to have tacitly endorsed Roblin's bid to become party leader in 1954.

He retired to Victoria, British Columbia in 1959, and died two years later in Winnipeg.
