= William H. Sims =

William H. Sims may refer to:

- William H. Sims (American politician) (1837–1920), American politician in Mississippi
- William Henry Sims (1872–1955), Canadian politician in Manitoba
