= Solomon Hart Green =

Canadian politician (1885–1969)

Solomon Hart Green (October 23, 1885 – April 13, 1969) was a Jewish Canadian politician in Manitoba, Canada. He served in the Legislative Assembly of Manitoba from 1910 to 1914, as a Liberal, making him the first Jewish Canadian to serve in that legislature.

Green was born in Saint John, New Brunswick, and was educated at King's College in Windsor, Nova Scotia. He received a law degree in 1906. Green then relocated to western Canada, and in 1907 became the first Jew admitted to the legal profession in Manitoba. He was a member of the firm Chapman and Green, and continued his practice in Winnipeg for several decades.

He was elected to the Manitoba legislature in the 1910 election, defeating incumbent Conservative John F. Mitchell by 620 votes in Winnipeg North. He won 27 of 35 polls in the constituency. The Conservatives won the election, and Green served as a member of the opposition for the next four years.

He was not a candidate in the 1914 election. He attempted to return to the legislature in 1915, but lost to Social Democrat Richard Rigg by 231 votes.

Green's biographical entry in the 1914 Canadian Parliamentary Guide lists him as "apparently the first Hebrew to take a seat in any Legislature in Canada". This is incorrect: Ezekiel Hart, who was in fact related to him, was elected to the Legislative Assembly of Lower Canada in 1807 and 1808, although he was expelled from his seat because he was a Jew. Henry Nathan, a federal Member of Parliament from British Columbia in the 1870s, was also Jewish.

Green remained an active member of the Liberal Party of Canada after leaving the legislature, and organized meetings for Liberal candidates at Winnipeg's Torah Talmud Hall in the 1920s. He was president of the Winnipeg North Liberal Association in 1930, and supported his party's decision not to field a candidate against Labor incumbent Abraham Albert Heaps in that year's federal election. Green argued that a Liberal candidate could have split the anti-Conservative vote, and allowed the Conservative candidate to be elected.

The Liberals nominated a candidate in Winnipeg North for the 1935 election, and on this occasion Green campaigned against Heaps on the grounds that the latter was a socialist. Heaps won the election.

The University of New Brunswick's Faculty of Law now offers Hart Green Scholarships as entrance awards, in his honour.

== Bibliography ==
- Stingel, Janine (2000). Social Discredit. McGill-Queen's University Press. ISBN 0-7735-2010-4.
