= Daniel McLean (Canadian politician) =

Canadian politician

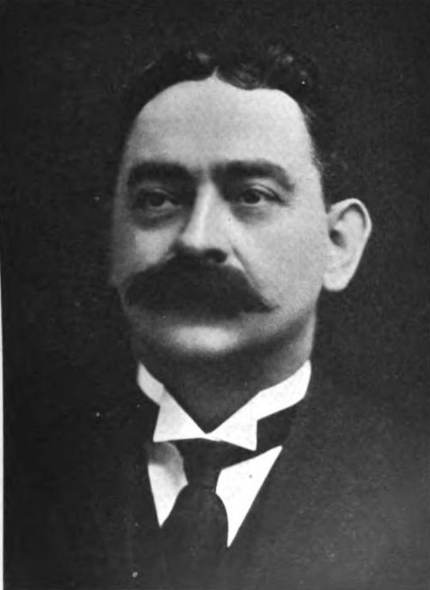

32nd Mayor of Winnipeg
- In office 1928–1929
- Preceded by: Ralph Webb
- Succeeded by: Ralph Webb

Member of the Legislative Assembly of Manitoba for Winnipeg North "B"
- In office 1914–1915

Personal details
- Born: January 4, 1868 Halton County, Ontario
- Died: March 2, 1950 (aged 82) Winnipeg, Manitoba
- Spouse: Albertha Blanchard
- Children: 3 sons 2 daughters

Lt.-Col. Daniel McLean (January 4, 1868 – March 2, 1950) was a politician in Manitoba, Canada. He served in the Legislative Assembly of Manitoba from 1914 to 1915, and later served as the 32nd Mayor of Winnipeg for two years. McLean was a member of the Conservative Party.

== Biography ==
McLean was born in the Scotch Block of Esquesing Township, Halton County, Ontario, the son of Mr. G. McLean, and was educated at public schools in Georgetown. McLean came to Manitoba in 1892. In 1895, he married A. Blanchard. He worked as a real estate broker and farmer, and served as president of McLean and Grisdale Ltd. He was also appointed Lieutenant-Colonel of the 106th Regiment (Winnipeg Light Infantry) on April 1, 1912. In religion, McLean was a Presbyterian.

McLean was an alderman in Winnipeg from 1907 to 1910, and a city controller from 1913 to 1914. He was elected to the Manitoba legislature in the 1914 provincial election, defeating Liberal candidate Robert Newton Lowery and Social Democrat Herman Saltzmann in Winnipeg North "B". The Conservatives won a majority government in this election, and McLean served as a backbench supporter of Rodmond Roblin's administration.

In 1915, the Roblin administration was forced to resign from office after a report commissioned by the Lieutenant Governor found the government guilty of corruption in the tendering of contracts for new legislative buildings. A new election was called, which the Liberals won in a landslide. McLean did not seek re-election.

During World War I, McLean served overseas as commander of the 101st Battalion of the Canadian Expeditionary Force. From 1918 to 1919, he served on Headquarters Staff for Military Division No. 10. From 1919 to 1921, he was commander of the 10th Battalion (Canadians), CEF.

He attempted to return to the legislature in the 1922 provincial election. By this time, the city of Winnipeg had been re-designed as a single ten-member constituency, with members chosen by a single transferable ballot. McLean finished in 24th place on the first count with 515 votes, and was eliminated on the twenty-first count.

He served as mayor of Winnipeg in 1928–29, succeeding fellow Conservative Ralph Webb. He was defeated by Webb when he ran for reelection as mayor for 1930.

He died in Winnipeg at the age of 82.
