= Donald Cromwell McDonald =

Canadian politician

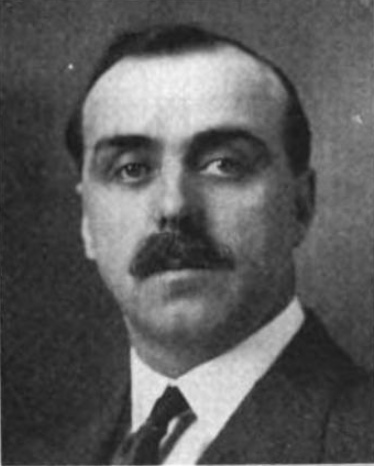

Member of the Legislative Assembly of Manitoba
- In office 1914–1915
- Constituency: Russell

Personal details
- Born: November 17, 1879 Bruce County, Ontario
- Died: October 3, 1917 (aged 37) Winnipeg, Manitoba
- Party: Liberal
- Spouse: Nellie McDonald (m. 1908)
- Occupation: Politician

Donald Cromwell McDonald (November 17, 1879 – October 3, 1917) was a politician in Manitoba, Canada. He served in the Legislative Assembly of Manitoba from 1914 to 1915 as a member of the Liberal Party.

== Biography ==
McDonald was born in Bruce County, Ontario, the son of Roger McDonald and Mary Cameron, and was educated at Port Elgin and Owen Sound. He later moved to Manitoba, and worked as a grain dealer. In 1914, McDonald served as mayor of Russell, Manitoba. He married Nellie McDonald in 1908. In religion, McDonald was a Presbyterian.

McDonald was elected to the Manitoba legislature in the 1914 provincial election, defeating Conservative candidate E. Graham by thirty votes in the Russell constituency. The Conservatives won the election, and McDonald sat with his party in opposition.

The Conservative administration of Rodmond Roblin was forced to resign from office in 1915, amid a serious corruption scandal. A new election was called, which the Liberals won in a landslide. McDonald was not a candidate.

He died in Winnipeg in 1917.
