= Harvey Simpson =

Canadian politician

Harvey Cathcart Simpson (February 11, 1862—January 29, 1928) was a politician in Manitoba, Canada. He served in the Legislative Assembly of Manitoba from 1909 to 1914, as a member of the Conservative Party.

Simpson was born in Ashton, Canada West (now Ontario), and educated at Ashton and Carleton Place. He came west in 1882, settling in Virden, Manitoba. In religion, Simpson was a Methodist. In 1882, he married Rhodella Armstrong Irwin.

He was first elected to the Manitoba legislature in a by-election for the Virden constituency, held on January 11, 1909. He defeated Liberal candidate Robert Forke by 206 votes, and served in the legislature as a backbench supporter of Rodmond Roblin's administration. He was re-elected in the 1910 election.

Simpson lost to Liberal George Clingan by 85 votes in the 1914 election.

He served overseas as a captain during World War I.

Simpson died in Point Grey, British Columbia at the age of 65.

His brother James also served as a member of the Manitoba assembly.

Simpson was married to Rhodella Armstrong Irwin on May 31, 1892 in Virden, MB. Together they had 5 children; Fred Irwin Simpson, Edith Frances Simpson, Mary Olive Victoria Simpson, Alice Rhodelle Simpson, and Hattie Mills Simpson.
