= Robert Jacob (politician) =

Canadian politician

Robert Jacob (December 5, 1879 – 1944) was a politician in Manitoba, Canada. He served in the Legislative Assembly of Manitoba as a Liberal from 1918 to 1920, and again from 1922 to 1927. Jacob was briefly a cabinet minister in the government of Tobias Norris.

Jacob was born at Baltonsborough in Somerset, England. He came to Canada as a farm worker in 1893, and was educated at public schools in Gladstone, Manitoba. He later attended law school in Winnipeg, and opened a private practice in the city after graduating in 1906. He was a member of the Winnipeg School Board, and served as chair of the Mothers' Allowance Commission for a time.

He was awarded life membership of the Manitoba Curling Association.

Jacob was first elected to the Manitoba legislature in a by-election, held on January 15, 1918 in the Winnipeg North "B" constituency following the resignation of Social Democrat Richard Rigg. Jacob ran as a "Union" Liberal supporting federal Prime Minister Robert Borden's wartime coalition government, and received support from Winnipeg's Conservative organization. He defeated independent candidate E.R. Levinson by about 700 votes.

After serving as a government backbencher for two years, Jacob sought re-election as a Liberal in the 1920 provincial election. Prior to this campaign, the three two-member constituencies in Winnipeg had been amalgamated into a ten-member district, with members elected by Single transferable voting. Jacob finished fourteenth on the first count, and was eliminated after the thirty-first count. At the provincial level, Norris's Liberals were reduced to an unstable minority government. They governed the province with difficulty for two years, and were defeated in the legislature in 1922.

Jacob was chosen to lead the Liberal campaign in Winnipeg for the 1922 provincial election, and as such was named to cabinet as Attorney General on June 6, 1922. He was easily returned to the legislature, placing second in the city and winning election on the first count. The Liberal Party was defeated provincially, however, as the United Farmers of Manitoba won most seats in rural areas.

The Norris administration, including Jacob, resigned from office on August 8. He served as an opposition member for the next five years, and did not seek re-election in the 1927 campaign.
