= John F. Mitchell =

Canadian politician

John Fletcher Mitchell (October 12, 1862 – October 6, 1943) was a politician in Manitoba, Canada. He served in the Legislative Assembly of Manitoba from 1908 to 1910, as a member of the Conservative Party.

== Biography ==
Mitchell was born in Cramahe, Canada West (now Ontario), to Esther L. Sweet and Samuel Mitchell; he was educated at public school and a commercial college. He moved to Manitoba in 1881, and became president of the Manitoba Printing and Engraving Corporation. He was also an alderman in Winnipeg for four years, and during part of 1900, acting mayor.

He was elected to the Manitoba legislature in the 1907 provincial election, winning a fairly easily victory over his Liberal opponent in Winnipeg North. The Conservative Party won this election under the leadership of Rodmond Roblin, and Mitchell served as a government backbencher for the next three years. He lost to Liberal candidate Solomon Hart Green by 620 votes in the 1910 election. He served as Quartermaster of the 10th Battalion during World War I, and was later Honorary Colonel of the regiment. He died in Winnipeg and is buried in the St. James Anglican Cemetery there.
