= William Neilson (Manitoba politician) =

Canadian politician

William Johnston Neilson
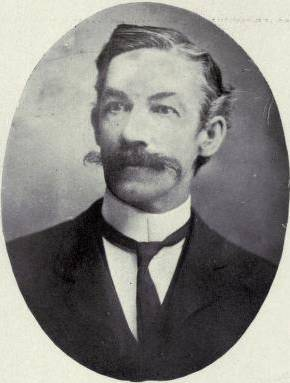

Member of the Legislative Assembly of Manitoba for Winnipeg North
- In office 1900–1903

Personal details
- Born: March 4, 1854 Perth, Ontario
- Died: July 17, 1903 (aged 49) Winnipeg, Manitoba

William Johnston Neilson (March 4, 1854 – July 17, 1903) was a physician and political figure in Manitoba. He represented Winnipeg North from 1900 to 1903 in the Legislative Assembly of Manitoba as a Conservative.

He was born in Perth, Lanark County, Canada West and was educated at McGill College, where he studied medicine. In 1881, Nielson moved to Winnipeg and lectured on anatomy at the Manitoba Medical School. He was named medical health officer for Winnipeg in 1883.

Nielson died in Winnipeg at the age of 49 and was buried in Perth.
