= Rick Wowchuk =

Canadian politician

Rick Wowchuk MLA

Member of the Legislative Assembly of Manitoba for Swan River
- Incumbent
- Assumed office 19 April 2016
- Preceded by: Ron Kostyshyn

Personal details
- Born: Richard Paul Wowchuk; December 26, 1954 (age 71) Swan River, Manitoba, Canada
- Party: Progressive Conservative

Richard Paul "Rick" Wowchuk (/ˈwoʊˌtʃʌk/ WOH-chuk; born 1958) is a Canadian politician and member of the Legislative Assembly of Manitoba, representing the electoral district of Swan River as a member of the Progressive Conservative Party of Manitoba. He was first elected in the 2016 provincial election, and re-elected in 2019 and 2023.

During the 2019 election campaign, Wowchuk came under scrutiny after it was revealed he was under sexual harassment allegations from his former constituency office assistant. It was reported Wowchuk violated workplace policy on five occasions, including by showing a picture of nude women to his assistant, making a comment about her wearing a bikini, and through a joke about taking a meeting with her on FaceTime while he himself was bathing. The allegations did not affect Wowchuk at the polls; he was allowed to remain in the PC caucus and was re-elected in his riding by a large margin.

On October 24, 2023, after an election in which the PCs lost government to the New Democratic Party, he was appointed as the Shadow Minister for Natural Resources.

== Electoral record ==
2023 Manitoba general election: Swan River
Party	Candidate	Votes	%	±%	Expenditures
Progressive Conservative	Rick Wowchuk	4,801	62.91	-5.95	$11,614.36
New Democratic	Andy Maxwell	2,433	31.88	+6.00	$6,625.95
Keystone	Don McKenna	397	5.20	–	$1,323.84
Total valid votes/expense limit		7,631	98.29	–	$52,337.00
Total rejected and declined ballots		133	1.71	–	
Turnout		7,764	57.90	+3.03	
Eligible voters		13,409			
Progressive Conservative hold		Swing		-5.98	
Source(s) Source: Elections Manitoba

2019 Manitoba general election: Swan River
Party	Candidate	Votes	%	±%	Expenditures
Progressive Conservative	Rick Wowchuk	5,546	68.87	12.68	$9,962.06
New Democratic	Shelley Wiggins	2,084	25.88	-7.27	$6,225.59
Liberal	David Teffaine	423	5.25	-1.34	$0.00
Total valid votes		8,053	–	–	
Rejected		62	–		
Eligible voters / turnout		14,790	54.87	-5.31	
Source(s) Source: Manitoba. Chief Electoral Officer (2019). Statement of Votes for the 42nd Provincial General Election, September 10, 2019 (PDF) (Report). Winnipeg: Elections Manitoba.

2016 Manitoba general election: Swan River
Party	Candidate	Votes	%	±%	Expenditures
Progressive Conservative	Rick Wowchuk	4,105	56.19	15.80	$27,515.00
New Democratic	Ron Kostyshyn	2,422	33.15	-23.00	$32,595.02
Liberal	Shayne Lynxleg	482	6.60	3.13	$131.25
Green	Dan Soprovich	297	4.07	–	$2,061.05
Total valid votes		7,306	–	–	$39,956.00
Rejected		25	–		
Eligible voters / turnout		12,182	60.18	0.52	
Source(s) Source: Manitoba. Chief Electoral Officer (2016). Statement of Votes for the 41st Provincial General Election, April 19, 2016 (PDF) (Report). Winnipeg: Elections Manitoba."Election Returns: 41st General Election". Elections Manitoba. 2016.
