= James Wells Robson =

Canadian politician

James Wells Robson (March 1, 1867 – January 28, 1941) was a politician in Manitoba, Canada. He served in the Legislative Assembly of Manitoba from 1903 to 1910, as a member of the Conservative Party.

Robson was born in Calcutta, India, the son of Dr. William Robson, a medical missionary from Edinburgh who entered the British Government's educational service. He was educated at George Watson's College for Boys in Edinburgh, in the law office of Simpson and Lawson, and at the Ontario Agricultural College in Guelph, Ontario. In 1891, Robson married Jane Balmer. He moved to Manitoba in 1891 and worked as a farmer at Portage la Prairie. In 1900, Robson moved to Swan River. He served as the first reeve of Swan River in 1902.

He was first elected to the Manitoba legislature in the 1903 provincial election, winning an easy victory in the Swan River constituency. The Conservative Party won this election under Rodmond Roblin's leadership, and Robson served as a government backbencher. He was re-elected with a reduced majority in 1907, and lost to Liberal candidate Daniel D. McDonald by 29 votes in 1910.

In 1911, Robson moved to Pelly, Saskatchewan. He died at home in Pelly at the age of 73.
