= Doug Gourlay =

Canadian politician

Member of the Legislative Assembly of Manitoba for Swan River
- In office 1977–1986
- Preceded by: James Bilton
- Succeeded by: Len Harapiak

Personal details
- Born: December 1, 1929 (age 96) Brandon, Manitoba, Canada
- Party: Progressive Conservative Party of Manitoba
- Education: University of Manitoba, University of Arizona, University of Colorado
- Occupation: Agrologist

Douglas MacLeod Gourlay (born December 1, 1929) is a politician in Manitoba, Canada. He was a Progressive Conservative member of the Legislative Assembly of Manitoba from 1977 to 1986, and was a cabinet minister in the government of Sterling Lyon.

Gourlay was born in 1929 in Brandon, Manitoba. The son of Andrew Jackson Gourlay and Catherine Macleod Rammage, he was educated at the University of Manitoba (receiving a Bachelor of Science degree in 1952), the University of Arizona and the University of Colorado. He served as with the Federal Department of Citizenship and Immigration from 1952 to 1956, and later worked as an agrologist. In 1952, Gourlay married Audrey May Porter.

Gourlay served as a councillor for the Town of Swan River in mid-northern Manitoba between 1972 and 1975, and was its Mayor from 1975 to 1977. He was also a member of the Manitoba Institute of Agrologists during this period.

He was first elected to the Manitoba legislature in the provincial election of 1977, narrowly defeating New Democratic Party candidate Leonard Harapiak in Swan River. He was not initially called to serve in Lyon's cabinet, but was named Minister of Municipal Affairs and Minister of Northern Affairs, with responsibility for the Communities Economic Development Fund on November 15, 1979.

The Tories were defeated in the 1981 provincial election, although Gourlay again defeated Harapiak by a narrow margin. He narrowly lost to Harapiak by 65 votes in their third encounter, in the provincial election of 1986. He has not sought a return to politics since this time.

In 1995, Gourlay became president and CEO of Montex Holding Company.
