= Robert Newton Lowery =

Canadian politician

Robert Newton Lowery (July 13, 1882 – April 27, 1962) was a politician in Manitoba, Canada. He served in the Legislative Assembly of Manitoba from 1915 to 1920 as a member of the Liberal Party.

== Background ==
Lowery was born in Detroit, Michigan, the son of Edward Wesley Lowery and Christina Elizabeth Maguire, and moved to Canada with his family in 1883. He attended public schools in Winnipeg. He first worked as an employee of the Canadian Pacific Railway and later worked as a real estate agent and broker. In 1909, Lowery married Gertrude Bowman. In religion, he was a Methodist. He was chair of the Selkirk Board of Management, and a director of the Young Men's Christian Association.

== Political career ==
Lowery first ran for the Manitoba legislature in the 1914 provincial election, and lost to Conservative candidate Daniel McLean by 623 votes in the Winnipeg North's "B" constituency. He contested Winnipeg North "A" in the 1915 election, and defeated Social Democratic candidate Arthur Beech by 195 votes (Conservative incumbent Joseph P. Foley finished third). The Liberals won a landslide majority in this election, and Lowery served as a backbench supporter of Tobias Norris's administration for the next five years.

Manitoba's electoral laws were changed prior to the 1920 provincial election, such that Winnipeg was redesigned as a single ten-member constituency with members chosen by a single transferable ballot. Lowery fared poorly in his bid for re-election, finishing in 30th place on the first ballot with only 254 votes. He was eliminated on the thirteenth count, having received only thirty more ballots through transfers.

Lowery's brother Edward Wesley was the candidate of the Liberal Party of Canada for Winnipeg North Centre in the 1925 federal election.

He died in Winnipeg at the age of 79.
