= Len Harapiak =

Canadian politician

Member of the Legislative Assembly of Manitoba for Swan River
- In office March 18, 1986 – April 26, 1988
- Preceded by: Douglas Gourlay
- Succeeded by: Parker Burrell

Personal details
- Born: July 4, 1942 (age 83)
- Party: New Democratic Party of Manitoba
- Occupation: School principal, farmer, politician

Leonard Harapiak (born July 4, 1942) is a Manitoba politician. He served in the NDP government of Howard Pawley, and narrowly lost the party's leadership to Gary Doer in 1988.

A school principal and part-time farmer, Harapiak first ran for the Manitoba NDP in 1977 in the north-western riding of Swan River. He was defeated by Progressive Conservative candidate Douglas Gourlay, but nonetheless impressed many in the party's leadership. Due to a physical resemblance, he was dubbed the "Ukrainian Bobby Kennedy", and was considered as a leadership candidate in 1979 when Edward Schreyer resigned. He declined this offer.

Harapiak lost to Gourlay for a second time in 1981. He finally won the Swan River riding in 1986, defeating Gourlay by 65 votes. He joined Howard Pawley's cabinet immediately after the election, being sworn in as Minister of Natural Resources on April 17, 1986. On September 21, 1987, he was moved to the Ministry of Agriculture.

After Pawley's government lost a vote of confidence in 1988, Harapiak ran for the Manitoba NDP leadership and did better than expected. He believed he had a chance of winning after placing a strong second on the first ballot, but was defeated by Gary Doer on the third by 21 votes. He was defeated by Tory Parker Burrell in the general election which followed.

Harapiak subsequently left politics, and worked as a director at the Winnipeg Technical Centre. His sister, Rosann Wowchuk, was appointed as a cabinet minister in Gary Doer's government in 1999.

He is also the brother of agronomist John Harapiak and Harry Harapiak.
