= James Bilton =

Canadian politician

James Herbert Bilton

20th Speaker of the Legislative Assembly of Manitoba
- In office December 5, 1966 – August 14, 1969
- Preceded by: Thelma Forbes
- Succeeded by: Ben Hanuschak

Member of the Legislative Assembly of Manitoba for Swan River
- In office December 14, 1962 – October 11, 1977
- Preceded by: Albert H. C. Corbett
- Succeeded by: Doug Gourlay

Personal details
- Born: April 10, 1908 Leeds, England
- Died: July 4, 1988 (aged 79) Ottawa, Ontario
- Party: Progressive Conservative
- Spouse: Mildred Mary Izon
- Occupation: Police officer

James Herbert Bilton (April 10, 1908 in Leeds, England – July 4, 1988) was an English-born Canadian politician in Manitoba. He was a Progressive Conservative member of the Legislative Assembly of Manitoba from 1962 to 1977, and served as Speaker of the Legislature for three years.

The son of Walter Bilton and Maria Mathersen, Bilton was educated in England and moved to Canada in 1929. He served with the Royal Canadian Mounted Police from 1931 to 1953, and retired with the rank of Staff Sgt. He was also the editor and publisher of the Swan River Star & Times, and a member of the Winnipeg Press Club. In 1938, he married Mildred Mary Izon.

Bilton was first elected to the legislature in the 1962 election, scoring an easy victory in the mid-northern riding of Swan River. In the election of 1966, he faced a surprisingly credible challenge from Gerald Webb of the Social Credit Party, but won by 406 votes. He was appointed Speaker of the Legislature after the election, and served until 1969.

The Tories were defeated in the 1969 election, and Bilton faced a strong challenge from New Democrat Alex Filuk, winning by only 163 votes. He was re-elected again by a greater margin in the 1973 election, and did not run in 1977.

In 1977, Bilton and his wife moved to Ottawa.
