= Sampson Walker =

Canadian politician

Sampson Walker (March 25, 1843 – March 7, 1933) was an English-born businessman and political figure in Manitoba. He represented Winnipeg North from 1903 to 1907 in the Legislative Assembly of Manitoba as a Conservative.

Born in Cheddleton, England, Walker came to Winnipeg with his family in 1882. He first worked for the Canadian Pacific Railway and then went into business on his own. Walker served as a member of Winnipeg city council in 1891. In 1903, he formed the Walker Oil Company which became part of the Canadian Oil Company in 1904. He served as Western Manager for the latter company until his retirement in 1905.

Walker died in Winnipeg at the age of 89.

The Turner-Walker Block, which he built in 1912, has been declared a municipal heritage building by the city of Winnipeg.
