= Albert H. C. Corbett =

Canadian politician

Member of the Legislative Assembly of Manitoba for Swan River
- In office 1977–1986
- Preceded by: George Renouf
- Succeeded by: James Bilton

Personal details
- Born: December 29, 1887 Springfield, Manitoba, Canada
- Died: April 14, 1983 (aged 95) Swan River, Manitoba, Canada
- Party: Progressive Conservative Party of Manitoba
- Occupation: Engineer

Albert Harold Corbett (December 29, 1887 – April 14, 1983) was a politician in Manitoba, Canada. He served in the Legislative Assembly of Manitoba as a Progressive Conservative from 1958 to 1962. His father, William Henry Corbett, was also a member of the Legislative Assembly from 1903 to 1907.

Born in 1887 at Springfield, Manitoba, Corbett was educated at the University of Manitoba, taking a program in Civil Engineering from 1907 to 1909. He worked as a civil engineer before entering public life, and was District Engineer of the Manitoba Public Works Department from 1916 to 1953. He is given credit for the construction of the highways between Mafeking and The Pas, between Dauphin and Swan River and between the Pas and Flin Flon. In 1915, he married Lillian Caroline Munroe.

He was first elected to the Manitoba legislature in the 1958 general election, defeating CCF candidate Hilliard Farriss by 105 votes in the Swan River constituency (incumbent Liberal-Progressive Ronald D. Robertson finished third). He was re-elected over Farriss by a greater margin in the 1959 election.

Corbett was a backbench supporter of Dufferin Roblin's government during his time in the legislature. He did not seek re-election in 1962. Corbett died in 1983.
