= Elias George Conklin =

Canadian politician

Mayor Elias George Conklin

5th Mayor of Winnipeg
- In office 1881–1881

Legislative Assembly of Manitoba member for Winnipeg North
- In office 1883–1886

Personal details
- Born: 16 August 1845 Keglane, Brant County, Canada West
- Died: 20 April 1901 (aged 55) Winnipeg, Manitoba, Canada
- Spouse: Janet Scott (m. 1873)

Elias George Conklin (16 August 1845 – 20 April 1901) was a member of the Legislative Assembly of Manitoba and the fifth Mayor of Winnipeg.

Conklin was born in 1845 near what is today Paris, Ontario. During his private career, he was a partner in the real estate firm Conklin and Fortune and was also involved in construction and grist mill ventures.

Towards the end of 1880, after Conklin had been a city alderman for some time, he defeated William Gomez Fonseca in the Winnipeg mayoral election. Conklin served as Mayor in 1881, then left that office after serving only one year.

Conklin was a Liberal candidate in Winnipeg in the 1882 Canadian federal election.

In 1883, he was elected for the Winnipeg North provincial riding. Conklin served one term there until his defeat in the 1886 provincial election.
