= Robert Emmond =

Canadian politician (1869–1935)

Robert William Emmond (November 25, 1869 – August 26, 1935) was a politician in Manitoba, Canada. He served in the Legislative Assembly of Manitoba from 1920 to 1927.

He was born in Bruce County, Ontario and came to Manitoba with his parents in 1877. Emmond was a successful farmer in Thunderhill, and served as postmaster of Benito, Manitoba. He first ran for the Manitoba legislature in the 1920 provincial election, contesting the western constituency of Swan River. Emmond first defeated Andrew McCleary to win the nomination of the local "People's Independent Party" (primarily a farmers' organization), and then defeated Liberal incumbent William H. Sims by 619 votes in the general election. Sims, who lost his deposit, remarked that the PIP was a "little greedy" to win by so much.

Emmond served in opposition for the next two years as a member of the Independent-Farmer legislative group. He contested the 1922 provincial election as a candidate of the United Farmers of Manitoba (UFM), and was easily returned over Conservative Dan Howe Sr. The UFM won the election, and Emmond served as a government backbencher for the next five years. He did not run for re-election in 1927.

Emmond died on his farm in Benito after suffering a stroke.
