= Edward Drewery =

Canadian politician

Edward Lancaster Drewry (February 6, 1851 – November 2, 1940) was an English-born brewer and political figure in Manitoba. He represented Winnipeg North from 1886 to 1888 in the Legislative Assembly of Manitoba as a Conservative. His surname also appears as Drewery.

He was born in London, the son of Edward Drewry, and came to St. Paul, Minnesota with his parents in 1860. He married Eliza Lile Starkey in 1874. In 1875, he moved to Pembina, Dakota Territory, and then, in 1877, moved to Winnipeg. Drewry took over the operation of the Herchmer and Batkin Brewery, operating it until 1924. He was also chairman of the Western board of the Union Bank of Canada and president of the Garton Pedigree Seed Company. Drewry served on Winnipeg city council from 1883 to 1884. From 1894 to 1899, he was chairman of the Winnipeg Parks Board. Drewry was also chairman of the local board of trade and a member of the Winnipeg General Hospital board.

Drewry died in Winnipeg at the age of 89.

Drewry's breweries were later incorporated into the Great Western Brewing Company.

In 2005, he was inducted into the Winnipeg Citizens Hall of Fame.
