= Jacques Parent =

Canadian politician

Jacques Parent (September 24, 1862 – February 6, 1918) was a politician in Manitoba, Canada. He served in the Legislative Assembly of Manitoba from 1914 to 1917 as a member of the Conservative Party.

He was born in Rimouski, Canada East, the son of Francois Parent and Adelaide Tremblay, and came to Manitoba with his family in 1876 by way of Woonsocket, Rhode Island. The family settled on a Dominion Lands Act homestead in the Letellier area. Parent was a farmer, grain dealer and financial agent. He also served on the board of the Manitoba Agricultural College. In 1894, he married Odille Henry.

He was first elected to the Manitoba legislature in the provincial election of 1914, defeating incumbent Liberal Thomas Molloy by 262 votes in the constituency of Morris. The Conservatives won a majority government in this election, and Parent served as a backbench supporter of Rodmond Roblin's administration.

The Roblin government was forced to resign in 1915 amid a corruption scandal, and the Conservatives were badly defeated in the election of 1915. Parent was one of only five Conservatives elected, defeating Molloy by fifty-seven votes.

Parent died in office in Rochester, Minnesota in 1918.
