= Peter McIntyre (judge) =

Canadian judge

Peter J. McIntyre is a justice who served on the Court of Queen's Bench of Alberta from 29 November 1994 to 5 January 2016. He also served as a part-time judge on the Supreme Court of Yukon.

On 14 July 2004, as a justice on the Supreme Court of Yukon, McIntyre declared same-sex marriages legal in Yukon, ordered the government to issue a marriage licence to a couple who had challenged the law. He changed the territory's common law definition of marriage from "a union between one man and one woman" to "the voluntary union for life of two persons to the exclusion of all others".
