= Joseph P. Foley =

Canadian politician (1872-1928)

Joseph Patrick Foley (March 2, 1872 – May 11, 1928) was a politician in Manitoba, Canada. He served in the Legislative Assembly of Manitoba from 1914 to 1915, as a member of the Conservative Party.

Foley was born in Halifax, Nova Scotia, the son of John Foley and Ellen Hogan, both natives of Ireland, and was educated at La Salle Academy in that city. In 1906, he married Minnie Sherry. He moved to Manitoba around 1908. Foley practised law with James Albert Manning Aikins and later with Tupper, McTavish, Foley and Tupper. In religion, he was a Roman Catholic.

He was elected to the Manitoba legislature in the 1914 provincial election, defeating Liberal candidate J. Willoughby by 319 votes in the Winnipeg North "A" constituency. The Conservatives won a majority government, and Foley served as a backbench supporter of Rodmond Roblin's administration.

In 1915, the Roblin ministry was forced to resign from office amid a serious corruption scandal. A new general election was called, which the Liberals won in a landslide. Foley finished third in his bid for re-election, losing to Liberal candidate Robert Newton Lowery.

Foley died in Winnipeg of a heart attack at the age of 56.
