= George R. Ray =

Canadian politician

George Raymond (Holman) Ray (November 30, 1869 – October 13, 1935) was an English-born politician in Manitoba, Canada. He served in the Legislative Assembly of Manitoba from 1914 to 1915, as a member of the Conservative Party.

Ray was born in Tunbridge Wells, Kent, England, as George Holman, the youngest child and only son of George and Hanna (née Ray) Holman, and was educated in England. Ray worked as an accountant in London and in Africa. He served in the Royal Navy from 1888 to 1891. In 1900, he married Maude Williams in Winnipeg, Manitoba, Canada. Ray became an employee of the Hudson's Bay Company in 1901. He served as post manager at Berens River, Churchill, York Factory, Norway House and Fort Alexander. In 1911, he became manager for the Nelson River district, stationed at Fort Nelson in northern Manitoba.

He was elected to the legislature in the 1914 provincial election, in a deferred election for the constituency Churchill and Nelson. The Conservatives had already won a majority government in the rest of the province, and Ray won without opposition. He served as a backbench supporter of Rodmond Roblin's government.

The Roblin administration was forced to resign in 1915, amid a serious corruption scandal. A new general election was called, which the Liberals won in a landslide. Ray did not seek re-election.

In 1920, Ray rejoined the Hudson's Bay Company as an inspector in the fur trade commissioner's office in Winnipeg and then, in 1921, became manager for the James Bay district. He retired from the Company in 1927.

He was the author of Just Craft and Skill, a play published in 1911, and Kasba, a novel published in 1915. His novel The Land Of Silence: A Novel Of The Great Northland was serialized in The Beaver from 1921 to 1923.

Ray died in hospital in Edmonton from pneumonia at the age of 65.
