= Andrew McCleary =

Canadian politician (1863–1944)

Andrew McCleary (1863 – 1944) was a Canadian politician who served in the Legislative Assembly of Manitoba from 1927 to 1932, as a member of the Progressive Party.

== Life ==
Born in Shelburne, Canada West, McCleary came to Minitonas, Manitoba and settled on a Dominion Lands Act homestead in the Ravensworth district. He served as a school trustee, was a member of the municipal council and was reeve for the Rural Municipality of Minitonas from 1912 to 1914. In 1920, he was president of a small local organization called the "People's Independent Party". He sought the nomination of this party for the constituency of Swan River in the 1920 provincial election, but lost to Robert Emmond.

He was elected to the Manitoba legislature in the 1927 provincial election in Swan River, defeating Liberal candidate William H. Sims and Conservative W. Hinchcliffe. He did not seek re-election in 1932. During his time in the legislature, McCleary was a backbench supporter of John Bracken's government.
