= James Morrow (Manitoba politician) =

Canadian politician

Member of the Legislative Assembly of Manitoba for Manitou
- In office 1911–1915

Personal details
- Born: July 8, 1857 Mille Isles, Canada East
- Died: March 1, 1949 (aged 91) Winnipeg, Manitoba
- Occupation: Farmer

James Morrow (July 8, 1857 – March 1, 1949) was a politician in Manitoba, Canada. He served in the Legislative Assembly of Manitoba from 1911 to 1915, as a member of the Conservative Party.

Morrow was born to William Morrow and Nancy Booth, an Irish family in Mille-Isles, Canada East (now Quebec). His father was a member of the 11th Argenteuil Rangers during the Fenian raids of 1866. Morrow was educated at common school, and worked as a farmer. He moved to Manitoba in 1879, and served as councillor and reeve of the Rural Municipality of Louise for ten years. Morrow married Mary A. McDougall in 1883. In religion, he was a Presbyterian.

He was first elected to the Manitoba legislature in a by-election held in the constituency of Manitou on October 31, 1911, after incumbent member Robert Rogers resigned to run for the House of Commons of Canada. Morrow was elected without opposition, and served as a backbench supporter of Rodmond Roblin's government. He was re-elected by seventy votes over Liberal I.H. Davidson in the 1914 provincial election.

The Roblin administration was forced to resign in 1915, after a report commissioned by the Lieutenant Governor found the government guilty of corruption in the tendering of contracts for new legislative buildings. A new election was called, which the Liberals won in a landslide. Morrow was not a candidate for re-election.

He died at the Grace Hospital in Winnipeg.
