= William Robertson Wood =

Canadian politician

The Reverend William Robertson Wood (June 6, 1874—December 11, 1947) was a minister, author, and politician in Canada. He served in the Legislative Assembly of Manitoba from 1915 to 1920, as a member of the Liberal Party. In 1925, he became a minister of The United Church of Canada, and served in British Columbia and Manitoba.

Wood was born in Veira, Orkney, Scotland, the son of William Wood and Margaret Robertson, and came to Canada in 1887. He was educated, first in Scotland, then at Port Elgin (now Saugeen Central Senior School), at the University of Toronto, and at Knox College in Toronto, graduating in April 1904. In June of the same year, he married Margaret Workman (1881-1966). Ordained as a Presbyterian Church in Canada minister, he served in Pickering, Ontario, first at Dunbarton (now Fairport-Dunbarton United Church), from June 16th 1904 (Ordination and Induction) to 1908, then in nearby Claremont, Ontario from 1908 to 1913. In 1911, he compiled the local history book, Past Years in Pickering: Sketches of the History of the Community, William Briggs Publisher, Toronto, Ontario. In 1913, he was called to Franklin, Manitoba, as the minister there and Glendale. He first ran for the Manitoba legislature in the 1914 provincial election, losing to Conservative cabinet minister James H. Howden by 32 votes in the Beautiful Plains constituency. Howden did not seek re-election in the 1915 election, and Wood defeated his Conservative opponent J.H. Irwin by 197 votes. The Liberals won a landslide majority in this election, and Wood served as a backbench supporter of Tobias Norris's government. He continued to work as a minister after winning the election to the provincial legislature, but resigned the pastoral charge. From 1916 to 1917, he was secretary of the Free Trade League of Canada. In 1917, he became secretary of the Manitoba Grain Growers' Association. In 1919 Wood received a D.D. from Bates College in Lewiston, Maine. He did not seek re-election in the 1920 Manitoba general election, where the riding was acclaimed by George Little. Wood became secretary of the United Farmers of Manitoba, serving until 1925. In the 1922 Manitoba general election, Little ran for the UFM, who eventually won the election under John Bracken.

In 1925, Wood became a minister of the United Church of Canada. He also became chairman of the Manitoba Prohibition Alliance.. In 1928, he became principal of the United Church of Canada's Ahousat Indian School on Vancouver Island and later, of the Portage la Prairie Indian Residential School at Portage la Prairie. From 1943 to 1946, Wood was chaplain for the Stony Mountain Penitentiary.

He died in Portage la Prairie as the result of injuries sustained in a fall in nearby Poplar Point. He is buried in Elmwood Cemetery in Winnipeg, Manitoba.
