= Robert Fern Lyons =

Canadian politician

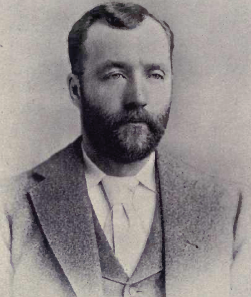

Member of the Legislative Assembly of Manitoba
- In office 1892–1895
- In office 1900–1914

Personal details
- Born: July 1, 1856 Leeds County, Canada West
- Died: December 29, 1926 (aged 70) Carberry, Manitoba
- Party: Conservative

Robert Fern Lyons (July 1, 1856 – December 29, 1926) was a politician in the province of Manitoba, Canada. He served in the Legislative Assembly of Manitoba from 1892 to 1895, and again from 1899 to 1914. Lyons was a member of the Conservative Party of Manitoba.

He was born at New Boyne, Canada West (now Ontario), and educated in Athens, Ontario. He later relocated to Manitoba, and worked as a farmer. Lyons was a Methodist, and an active Master freemason.

He was first elected to the Manitoba legislature in the 1892 provincial election, defeating Liberal candidate S.J. Thompson by 82 votes in the Norfolk constituency. The Liberals won this election, and Lyons served as an opposition member. He lost his constituency seat to Liberal George Rogers by 170 votes in the 1896 election.

Lyons was re-elected in the 1899 election, defeating new Liberal candidate J.G. Barron by 68 votes. The Conservatives won the election, and Lyons served as a backbench supporter of the Hugh John Macdonald and Rodmond Roblin administrations. He was re-elected in the provincial elections of 1903, 1907 and 1910.

He lost the Norfolk constituency to Liberal John Graham by 68 votes in the 1914 election. He attempted a comeback in the 1915 election, but lost by an increased majority.

Lyons died at Carberry, Manitoba, in 1926.
