= George Ray (1920s footballer) =

English footballer

Personal information
- Place of birth: Manchester, England
- Position: Right half

Senior career*
| Years | Team | Apps | (Gls) |
- Frizington
| 1927–1929 | Bradford City | 2 | (0) |
- Derry City
- * Club domestic league appearances and goals

George Ray was an English professional footballer who played as a right half.

== Career ==
Born in Manchester, Ray joined Bradford City from Frizington in November 1927. He made 2 league appearances for the club, before moving to Derry City in July 1929.

== Sources ==
- Frost, Terry (1988). Bradford City A Complete Record 1903-1988. Breedon Books Sport. ISBN 0-907969-38-0.
