= Peter McIntyre (Manitoba politician) =

Canadian politician

Peter Campbell McIntyre
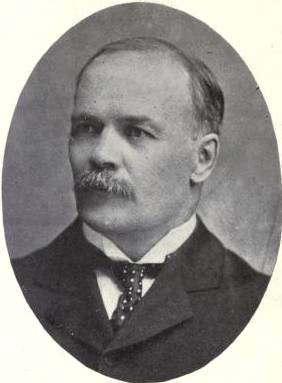

Member of the Legislative Assembly of Manitoba for Winnipeg North
- In office 1892–1899

Personal details
- Born: February 5, 1854; Balderson, Ontario
- Died: October 30, 1930 (aged 76); Winnipeg, Manitoba

Peter Campbell McIntyre (February 5, 1854 – October 30, 1930) was a printer and political figure in Manitoba. He represented Winnipeg North from 1892 to 1899 in the Legislative Assembly of Manitoba as a Liberal.

He was born in Balderson, Lanark County, Canada West, the son of Hugh McIntyre, a native of Scotland, and Janet Campbell, who was born in Canada. After completing his schooling in Balderson and Perth, McIntyre taught school for eight years in all, the last two years in Winnipeg, Manitoba, where he arrived in 1878. From 1880 to 1900, he was employed in the printing business. McIntyre was then named postmaster at Winnipeg. In 1882, he married Emily Kerr. McIntyre served ten years with the Winnipeg Public School Board, serving five years as board chairman. He was defeated when he ran for reelection to the Manitoba assembly in 1899.

McIntyre died in Winnipeg at the age of 76.
