= Daniel D. McDonald =

Canadian politician (1865–1945)

Daniel Duncan McDonald (May 13, 1865 – November 1945) was a politician in Manitoba, Canada. He served in the Legislative Assembly of Manitoba from 1910 to 1914, as a member of the Liberal Party.

McDonald was born in Nairn, Canada West (now Ontario), and educated at Lochaber, East Williams Township in Middlesex County. He later moved to Manitoba, and worked as a farmer.

He served as a councillor in the Municipality of Swan River for four years, and was reeve for two years. In religion, McDonald was a Presbyterian.

He was elected to the Manitoba legislature in the 1910 provincial election, defeating Conservative incumbent James W. Robson by 29 votes. The Conservatives won the election, and McDonald served in the legislature as a member of the opposition. He did not seek re-election in 1914.

McDonald then left the Liberal Party, and attempted to return to the legislature as a Conservative in the 1915 election. The Conservatives were resoundingly defeated in this campaign, and McDonald lost to Liberal candidate William Sims by 212 votes.
