= Peter McIntyre (footballer, born 1875) =

Scottish footballer

Personal information
- Full name: Peter McIntyre
- Date of birth: 11 November 1875
- Place of birth: Glenbuck, Scotland
- Date of death: 1938 (aged 62–63)
- Place of death: Lanark, Scotland
- Position: Centre half

Senior career*
Years	Team	Apps	(Gls)
1894–1895	Glenbuck Cherrypickers		
1895–1897	Rangers	3	(0)
1897	Abercorn	0	(0)
1897–1898	Wigan County		
1898–1901	Preston North End	87	(5)
1901–1902	Sheffield United	3	(0)
1902	Hamilton Academical	3	(0)
1902–1903	Portsmouth		
1903–1908	Hamilton Academical	102	(13)
1908–1913	Abercorn	35	(0)
- * Club domestic league appearances and goals

Peter McIntyre (11 November 1875 – 1938) was a Scottish footballer who played in the Football League for Preston North End and Sheffield United.
