= William James Westwood =

Canadian politician

William James Westwood (August 19, 1887—March 7, 1962) was a politician in Manitoba, Canada. He served in the Legislative Assembly of Manitoba from 1917 to 1920, and again from 1932 to 1936.

Westwood was born in Pendinnis, Manitoba, the son of Fred T. Westwood and Sarah Jane Gregory, and was educated at Rapid City and Brandon Baptist College. He worked as a notary public and municipal clerk, and served as secretary of the Roblin Pool Elevator Association. He worked with the Union Bank of Canada in Roblin from December 1906 to November 1917. In 1912, Westwood married Carrie Marie Hartford. From 1920 to 1946, he was secretary-treasurer for the Rural Municipality of Shell River. Westwood was mayor of Roblin from 1944 to 1946. In 1945, he moved to Russell, where he purchased a hardware store which he operated with his sons until 1960.

He was first elected to the Manitoba legislature in a by-election held in the Roblin constituency on November 19, 1917. He served as an independent member of the legislature, and did not seek re-election in the provincial election of 1920.

Westwood was elected to the legislature for a second time in the 1932 election, again in the division of Roblin. He still identified himself as an independent, but was now supported by the governing Liberal-Progressive alliance led by John Bracken. He defeated Conservative incumbent Frederic Y. Newton by 609 votes, and served as a pro-government independent.

He was defeated in the 1936 election, losing to S. E. Rogers of the newly formed Social Credit League.

He died in Russell at the age of 74.

Westwood's son, Fred Westwood, was a candidate for the Liberal Party of Canada in the 1965 federal election.
