= George Clingan =

Canadian politician (1868–1944)

Colonel George Clingan (March 28, 1868 – January 24, 1944) was a physician, soldier and politician in Manitoba, Canada. He served in the Legislative Assembly of Manitoba from 1914 to 1922, as a member of the Liberal Party.

== Biography ==
Clingan was born in Dufferin County, Ontario, the son of Flemming Clingan and Mary Ann Cumberland, and was educated in Orangeville and at the Toronto Medical College. He received certification as a physician and surgeon. Clingan practised medicine in the village of Horning's Mills in Ontario, later moving to Manitoba. He also became a Major in the 12th Manitoba Dragoons. Clingan began his military career with the Dragoons in 1898, and saw military service overseas in France with a hospital unit during World War I. In 1938, he was named president of the Manitoba Medical Association. In religion, he was a Methodist. Clingan married Ida Thompson.

From 1908 to 1909, Clingan served as mayor of Virden, Manitoba. He was first elected to the Manitoba legislature in the provincial election of 1914, defeating Conservative incumbent Harvey C. Simpson by eighty-five votes in the rural, southwestern riding of Virden.

In 1915, the Conservative government of Rodmond Roblin was forced to resign amid a corruption scandal. The Liberals formed government, and won a landslide majority in the provincial election of 1915. Clingan was re-elected in Virden

The Liberals were reduced to a minority government in the 1920 election, as Clingan defeated his Farmer opponent R.E. Knight by 291 votes. Two years later, in the 1922 election, he lost his seat to United Farmers of Manitoba candidate Robert Mooney by 677 votes. Mooney went on to hold the seat until his death in 1953.

He died in Virden in 1944 from injuries received in an automobile accident.
