= Richard Rigg (Canadian politician) =

Canadian politician

Richard Arthur Rigg (January 5, 1872 – August 1, 1964) was a Methodist minister and politician in Manitoba, Canada. He served in the Legislative Assembly of Manitoba from 1915 to 1917, and is notable as the first member of the Social Democratic Party to serve in that body.

Rigg was born in Todmorden, Lancashire, England, and came to Canada in 1903. He was a bookbinder as well as a Methodist minister, and served as a first permanent business agent of the Winnipeg Trades Council. He was initially a member of the Socialist Party of Canada, but broke away from the SPC in 1911 to help form the Social Democratic Party. Along with Jacob Penner and Herman Saltzman, he co-authored the SDP's first manifesto.

By 1917 he had a wife and five children.

Rigg campaigned for the House of Commons of Canada in the 1911 federal election, but finished third in the riding of Winnipeg against Conservative Alexander Haggart.

In 1913, Rigg was elected to the Winnipeg City Council for Ward Five in the city's north end. He received considerable support from the city's Jewish community, and in his victory speech pledged to support religious, national and political equality for all members of Canada's working class. Rigg's victory began a tradition of social-democratic representation in Winnipeg's council which has continued to the present day.

Rigg was elected to the Manitoba legislature in the provincial election of 1915, defeating Liberal candidate Solomon Hart Green by 231 votes in the Winnipeg North "B" constituency. Nominated as an SDP candidate, Rigg also received support from the more centrist Labour Representation Committee.

During the 1915 campaign, Rigg and fellow SDP candidate Arthur Beech emphasized both general reforms and the broader working-class struggle. Their meetings were often disrupted by members of the hardline Socialist Party, who accused Rigg and Beech of being "sentimentalists and Christ-lovers". The Socialist Party did not field candidates against them, however. Rigg's success was credited, in part, to strong support from members of north end ethnic communities.

In the legislature, Rigg pressed for improvements to Manitoba's Factories Act, and unsuccessfully attempted to raise the minimum age of factory labour, to outlaw child labour. Rigg was generally supportive of the provincial Liberal government of Tobias Norris, claiming that the Norris administration did more for labour in its first six months than the previous Conservative administration of Rodmond Roblin had done in fifteen years.

Rigg resigned from the legislature in 1917 to run again as a candidate for the Canadian House of Commons. The SDP initially nominated John Queen as its candidate in Winnipeg North, but centrist party members declared that Queen could not win and nominated Rigg in his place. Rigg's nomination was subsequently confirmed by special convention of Winnipeg's working-class organizations. Rigg advocated for nationalization of industry.

Rigg's campaign was based primarily on opposition to Prime Minister Robert Borden's policy of conscripting men for military service in World War I. He received the endorsement of "Laurier Liberals", who declined to run a candidate of their own. Rigg made the following statement during the campaign: "I regard human life as the supremely sacred thing and believe that if the state had adopted the policy of the conscription of money, industry and natural resources, there would be absolutely no necessity for the passing and enforcing of any scheme to conscript men".

He called for a referendum on the conscription issue. Government supporters responded by accusing Rigg's supporters of disloyalty. He was unsuccessful, losing to Union government candidate Matthew Robert Blake by a margin of 9,656 votes to 3,472. Many working-class voters in Winnipeg did not vote to oppose Borden's government in wartime.

Rigg himself joined the Canadian Army in 1917 and served overseas.

After his return, he served as Superintendent of Employment Offices for Western Canada from 1919 to 1922, and as Director of the Employment Service of the Department of Labour in 1922. He retired in 1940.

In 1919, as a prominent war veteran, he drafted a motion asking the Great War Veterans' Association to support the Winnipeg General Strike. It was approved by the Great War Veterans' Association.
