= John Graham (Manitoba politician) =

Canadian politician

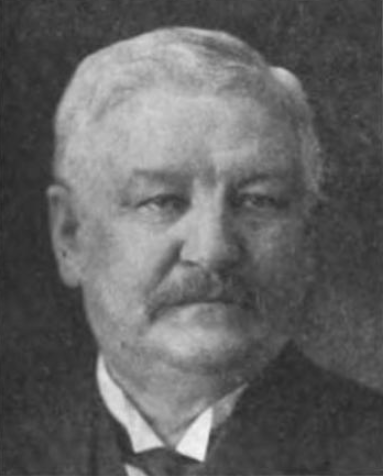

Member of the Legislative Assembly of Manitoba
- In office 1914–1920

Personal details
- Born: March 9, 1864; Selkirkshire, Scotland
- Died: November 7, 1951 (aged 87); St. Vital, Manitoba
- Political party: Liberal
- Spouse: Elizabeth Heattie (m. 1892)
- Occupation: Farmer, politician

John Graham (March 9, 1864 – November 7, 1951) was a politician in Manitoba, Canada. He served in the Legislative Assembly of Manitoba from 1914 to 1920, as a member of the Liberal Party.

== Biography ==
Graham was born in Selkirkshire, Scotland, the son of William Graham and Lillias Riddell, and was educated at Aslekirk, Selkirk and Heriot, Midlothian. He came to Canada in 1890, and worked as a farmer and livestock importer. In 1892, Graham married Elizabeth Heattie. For many years, he was the Manitoba vice-president on the Board of the Clydesdale Horse Association. Graham resided in Carberry during his political career, and was a Presbyterian in religion.

He was first elected to the Manitoba legislature in the 1914 provincial election, defeating incumbent Conservative Robert F. Lyons by sixty-eight votes in the constituency of Norfolk. The Conservatives won this election, and Graham sat as a member of the opposition.

In early 1915, the Conservative administration of Rodmond Roblin was forced from office amid a corruption scandal. A new election was called, which the Liberals won in a landslide. Graham was personally re-elected, defeating Lyons by 163 votes. For the next five years, he served as a backbench supporter of Tobias Norris's administration. He was defeated in the 1920 election, losing to Conservative Reuben Waugh by 217 votes.

He died at home in St. Vital in 1951.
