= Thomas B. Molloy =

Canadian politician (1878–1948)

Thomas Boniface Molloy (November 28, 1878 – June 20, 1948) was a politician in Manitoba, Canada. He served in the Legislative Assembly of Manitoba from 1914 to 1915, as a member of the Liberal Party.

== Early life ==
Molloy was born in Shelley, Manitoba. His father, John Molloy, was a Dominion land surveyor, and was involved in early construction of the Canadian Pacific Railway. The elder Molloy sought election to the House of Commons of Canada in the 1879 federal election, but lost to Joseph Royal of the Conservative Party in the riding of Provencher. Thomas Molloy was educated at public school in Emerson, and at normal school in Winnipeg. He worked as a contractor. He was reeve of the Rural Municipality of Ste. Anne from 1919 to 1921.

== Political career ==
Thomas Molloy was elected to the Manitoba legislature in the 1914 provincial election, defeating Conservative incumbent Albert Prefontaine by seven votes in the Carillon constituency. The Conservatives won the election, and Molloy sat with his party in opposition.

In 1915, the Conservative government of Rodmond Roblin was forced to resign from office amid a corruption scandal. A new election was called, in which the Liberals won a landslide majority. Molloy, however, lost his seat to Prefontaine by twenty-four votes. His defeat was primarily due to the Liberal Party's unpopularity among some francophone voters, who opposed the party's plans to end funding for denominational education.

Molloy ran for the Canadian House of Commons in the federal election of 1921 as a candidate of the Liberal Party of Canada, and lost to Progressive candidate Robert Alexander Hoey by 1,397 votes in the riding of Springfield. He also attempted to return to the provincial legislature in 1927, but lost to Prefontaine by 1,146 votes. Prefontaine was by this time a member of the Progressive Party of Manitoba.

Molloy made a further bid for elected office in the 1935 federal election, running as a candidate of Henry Herbert Stevens's Reconstruction Party in the riding of St. Boniface. He finished last in a field of five candidates with only 438 votes.

== Personal life and death ==
In 1911, Molloy married Marie, the daughter of Joseph Dubuc. His brothers John Patrick and William also served in the Manitoba assembly.

He died at home in Montreal at the age of 69.

== Electoral history ==
1935 Canadian federal election: Saint Boniface—Saint Vital
Party	Candidate	Votes	%	±%
Liberal	John Power Howden	7,353	56.8	+5.1
Co-operative Commonwealth	Edwin Arnold Hansford	2,304	17.8	+3.5
Conservative	Joseph-Placide Bertrand	2,222	17.2	-16.8
Social Credit	Victor James Gray	624	4.8	
Reconstruction	Thomas Boniface Molloy	438	3.4	
Total valid votes		12,941	100.0	
