= Sam Hughes (Manitoba politician) =

Canadian politician

Sam Hughes (June 13, 1873 – March 24, 1940) was a politician in Manitoba, Canada. He served in the Legislative Assembly of Manitoba from 1910 to 1915, as a member of the Conservative Party.

Hughes was born in Durham County, Ontario, and was educated at Hamilton Business College. He was a cousin to Sir Sam Hughes. He worked as a farmer and stock dealer, and was director of L.L.T. Stooker Co. In 1890 he came to Manitoba. Hughes was also a councillor and reeve in the Rural Municipality of Grandview, and served as vice-president of the Agricultural Society. In religion, he was a Methodist. He married Annie Adkins of Winnipeg in 1901, and they had five children.

He was first elected to the Manitoba legislature in the 1910 provincial election, defeating his Liberal opponent by 105 votes in the constituency of Gilbert Plains. The Conservatives won a majority government in this election, and Hughes served in the legislature as a backbench supporter of Rodmond Roblin's ministry. He was re-elected with an increased majority in the 1914 election.

In 1915, the Roblin administration was forced to resign from office amid a serious corruption scandal. A new election was called, which the Liberal Party won in a landslide. Hughes lost his constituency to Liberal William Findlater by 591 votes. He attempted to return to the legislature in the 1927 provincial election, but lost to Progressive candidate Arthur Berry. He died at Winnipeg in 1940.
