= Winnipeg North (provincial electoral district) =

Defunct provincial electoral district in Manitoba, Canada

Winnipeg North was a provincial electoral district in Manitoba, Canada, covering part of the city of Winnipeg. It existed on two separate occasions.

It was initially created for the 1883 provincial election, and abolished with the 1920 election when Winnipeg became a single, ten-member constituency. At first it had one MLA elected using first past the post. In 1914 and 1915 it elected two MLAs in separate contests using first past the post.

Winnipeg North was re-established for the elections of 1949 and 1953 as a four-member constituency electing MLAs using STV. In 1958, it was divided into several single-member constituencies.

== Members of the Legislative Assembly ==
=== Original constituency ===
The Winnipeg North constituency was created for the 1883 election, when the original Winnipeg constituency was divided into two sections: Winnipeg North and Winnipeg South. It was a single-member constituency until the 1914 election, when it returned two members. In 1914 and 1915 elections, electors of Winnipeg North were allowed to cast one vote for each of the two seats, which were called "Winnipeg North A" and "Winnipeg North B". This "post" system ended in 1920 when the district was rolled into a new single city wide district electing ten through STV.

In the early 20th century, Winnipeg North became known for its large working-class and immigrant communities. Many electors were recent immigrants from Eastern Europe, who profoundly changed the area's political character.

Solomon Hart Green, elected in 1910, was the first Jewish Canadian to serve in a Canadian provincial legislature. Richard Rigg, returned in 1915 for Winnipeg North "B", was the first Social Democrat elected in Manitoba.

==== Winnipeg North ====
| Name | Party | Took office | Left office |
| Elias Conklin | Liberal | 1883 | 1886 |
| Edward Drewry | Conservative | 1886 | 1888 |
| Lyman Jones | Liberal | 1888 | 1892 |
| Peter McIntyre | Liberal | 1892 | 1899 |
| William Neilson | Conservative | 1899 | 1903 |
| Sampson Walker | Conservative | 1903 | 1907 |
| John F. Mitchell | Conservative | 1907 | 1910 |
| Solomon Hart Green | Liberal | 1910 | 1914 |

==== Winnipeg North A ====
| Name | Party | Took office | Left office |
| Joseph P. Foley | Conservative | 1914 | 1915 |
| Robert Newton Lowery | Liberal | 1915 | 1920 |

==== Winnipeg North B ====
| Name | Party | Took office | Left office |
| Daniel McLean | Conservative | 1914 | 1915 |
| Richard Rigg | Social Democrat | 1915 | 1917 |
| Robert Jacob | Unionist-Liberal | 1917 | 1920 |

=== Re-established constituency ===
The single constituency of Winnipeg was divided into three sections for the 1949 election: Winnipeg North, Winnipeg Centre and Winnipeg South. All three constituencies elected four members to the legislature, with electors choosing members by a single transferable ballot.

Winnipeg North had very prominent Jewish and Ukrainian communities in this period, and was by far the most left-wing section of the city. Bill Kardash, Manitoba's only Communist Member of the Legislative Assembly (MLA), was returned for Winnipeg North in both 1949 and 1953. The socialist Cooperative Commonwealth Federation was the area's dominant party, and returned two members in both elections.

The constituency was eliminated at the 1958 election, when Manitoba abolished its multi-member seats. Several single-member constituencies were created in its place.

==== Winnipeg North (1949–1958) ====
| Name | Party | Took office | Left office |
|---|---|---|---|
| Morris Gray | CCF | 1949 | 1958 |
| John Hawryluk | CCF | 1949 | 1958 |
| Bill Kardash | Communist | 1949 | 1958 |
| Frank Chester | Liberal–Progressive | 1949 | 1953 |
| Alexander Turk | Liberal–Progressive | 1953 | 1958 |

== Election results ==
=== 1883 ===
1883 Manitoba general election
| Party | Candidate | Votes | % |
|---|---|---|---|
| Liberal | Elias George Conklin | 299 | 57.83 |
| Conservative | Albert Monkman | 218 | 42.17 |
| Total valid votes | | 517 | – |
| Rejected | | N/A | – |
| Eligible voters / Turnout | | N/A | – |
Source(s) Source: Manitoba. Chief Electoral Officer (1999). Statement of Votes for the 37th Provincial General Election, September 21, 1999 (PDF) (Report). Winnipeg: Elections Manitoba.

=== 1886 ===
1886 Manitoba general election
| Party | Candidate | Votes | % | ±% |
|---|---|---|---|---|
| Conservative | Edward Drewery | 1,377 | 54.41 | 12.24 |
| Liberal | Elias George Conklin | 1,154 | 45.59 | -12.24 |
| Total valid votes | | 2,531 | – | – |
| Rejected | | N/A | – | |
| Eligible voters / Turnout | | 6,073 | 41.68 | – |
Source(s) Source: Manitoba. Chief Electoral Officer (1999). Statement of Votes for the 37th Provincial General Election, September 21, 1999 (PDF) (Report). Winnipeg: Elections Manitoba.

=== 1888 ===
1888 Manitoba general election
| Party | Candidate | Votes | % | ±% |
|---|---|---|---|---|
| Liberal | Lyman Melvin Jones | 848 | 66.88 | 21.28 |
| Conservative | Justin Joseph Golden | 420 | 33.12 | -21.28 |
| Total valid votes | | 1,268 | – | – |
| Rejected | | N/A | – | |
| Eligible voters / Turnout | | N/A | – | – |
Source(s) Source: Manitoba. Chief Electoral Officer (1999). Statement of Votes for the 37th Provincial General Election, September 21, 1999 (PDF) (Report). Winnipeg: Elections Manitoba.

=== 1892 ===
1892 Manitoba general election
| Party | Candidate | Votes | % | ±% |
|---|---|---|---|---|
| Liberal | Peter McIntyre | 840 | 60.00 | -6.88 |
| Conservative | George Huestis Campbell | 560 | 40.00 | 6.88 |
| Total valid votes | | 1,400 | – | – |
| Rejected | | N/A | – | |
| Eligible voters / Turnout | | 1,895 | 73.88 | – |
Source(s) Source: Manitoba. Chief Electoral Officer (1999). Statement of Votes for the 37th Provincial General Election, September 21, 1999 (PDF) (Report). Winnipeg: Elections Manitoba.

=== 1896 ===
1896 Manitoba general election
| Party | Candidate | Votes | % | ±% |
|---|---|---|---|---|
| Liberal | Peter McIntyre | 906 | 57.56 | -2.44 |
| Conservative | Thomas William Taylor | 668 | 42.44 | 2.44 |
| Total valid votes | | 1,574 | – | – |
| Rejected | | N/A | – | |
| Eligible voters / Turnout | | 2,160 | 72.87 | -1.01 |
Source(s) Source: Manitoba. Chief Electoral Officer (1999). Statement of Votes for the 37th Provincial General Election, September 21, 1999 (PDF) (Report). Winnipeg: Elections Manitoba.

=== 1899 ===
1899 Manitoba general election
| Party | Candidate | Votes | % | ±% |
|---|---|---|---|---|
| Conservative | William Neilson | 1,247 | 55.06 | 12.62 |
| Liberal | Peter McIntyre | 1,018 | 44.94 | -12.62 |
| Total valid votes | | 2,265 | – | – |
| Rejected | | N/A | – | |
| Eligible voters / Turnout | | 3,454 | 65.58 | -7.29 |
Source(s) Source: Manitoba. Chief Electoral Officer (1999). Statement of Votes for the 37th Provincial General Election, September 21, 1999 (PDF) (Report). Winnipeg: Elections Manitoba.

=== 1903 ===
1903 Manitoba general election
| Party | Candidate | Votes | % | ±% |
|---|---|---|---|---|
| Conservative | Sampson Walker | 1,106 | 40.16 | -14.90 |
| Liberal | John Wesley Cockburn | 1,057 | 38.38 | -6.56 |
| Labour | Robert Thoms | 591 | 21.46 | – |
| Total valid votes | | 2,754 | – | – |
| Rejected | | N/A | – | |
| Eligible voters / Turnout | | 3,675 | 74.94 | 9.36 |
Source(s) Source: Manitoba. Chief Electoral Officer (1999). Statement of Votes for the 37th Provincial General Election, September 21, 1999 (PDF) (Report). Winnipeg: Elections Manitoba.

=== 1907 ===
1907 Manitoba general election
| Party | Candidate | Votes | % | ±% |
|---|---|---|---|---|
| Conservative | John F. Mitchell | 2,244 | 54.49 | 14.33 |
| Independent | Alexander Macdonald | 1,874 | 45.51 | – |
| Total valid votes | | 4,118 | – | – |
| Rejected | | N/A | – | |
| Eligible voters / Turnout | | 4,576 | 89.99 | 15.05 |
Source(s) Source: Manitoba. Chief Electoral Officer (1999). Statement of Votes for the 37th Provincial General Election, September 21, 1999 (PDF) (Report). Winnipeg: Elections Manitoba.

=== 1910 ===
1910 Manitoba general election
| Party | Candidate | Votes | % | ±% |
|---|---|---|---|---|
| Liberal | Solomon Hart Green | 2,175 | 47.06 | – |
| Conservative | John F. Mitchell | 1,555 | 33.64 | -20.85 |
| Socialist | Edmund Fulcher | 892 | 19.30 | – |
| Total valid votes | | 4,622 | – | – |
| Rejected | | N/A | – | |
| Eligible voters / Turnout | | 5,055 | 91.43 | 1.44 |
Source(s) Source: Manitoba. Chief Electoral Officer (1999). Statement of Votes for the 37th Provincial General Election, September 21, 1999 (PDF) (Report). Winnipeg: Elections Manitoba.

=== 1914 ===
==== Winnipeg North A ====
1914 Manitoba general election
| Party | Candidate | Votes | % |
|---|---|---|---|
| Conservative | Joseph P. Foley | 3,135 | 39.82 |
| Liberal | James Willoughby | 2,816 | 35.77 |
| Labour | Arthur Beech | 1,921 | 24.40 |
| Total valid votes | | 7,872 | – |
| Rejected | | N/A | – |
| Eligible voters / Turnout | | 9,400 | 83.74 |
Source(s) Source: Manitoba. Chief Electoral Officer (1999). Statement of Votes for the 37th Provincial General Election, September 21, 1999 (PDF) (Report). Winnipeg: Elections Manitoba.

==== Winnipeg North B ====
1914 Manitoba general election
| Party | Candidate | Votes | % |
|---|---|---|---|
| Conservative | Daniel McLean | 3,268 | 40.95 |
| Liberal | Robert Newton Lowery | 2,645 | 33.14 |
| Labour | Herman Saltzman | 2,068 | 25.91 |
| Total valid votes | | 7,981 | – |
| Rejected | | N/A | – |
| Eligible voters / Turnout | | 9,400 | 84.90 |
Source(s) Source: Manitoba. Chief Electoral Officer (1999). Statement of Votes for the 37th Provincial General Election, September 21, 1999 (PDF) (Report). Winnipeg: Elections Manitoba.

=== 1915 ===
==== Winnipeg North A ====
1915 Manitoba general election
| Party | Candidate | Votes | % | ±% |
|---|---|---|---|---|
| Liberal | Robert Newton Lowery | 2,443 | 39.52 | 3.75 |
| Labour | Arthur Beech | 2,248 | 36.37 | 11.97 |
| Conservative | Joseph P. Foley | 1,490 | 24.11 | -15.72 |
| Total valid votes | | 6,181 | – | – |
| Rejected | | N/A | – | |
| Eligible voters / Turnout | | 8,093 | 76.37 | -7.37 |
Source(s) Source: Manitoba. Chief Electoral Officer (1999). Statement of Votes for the 37th Provincial General Election, September 21, 1999 (PDF) (Report). Winnipeg: Elections Manitoba.

==== Winnipeg North B ====
1915 Manitoba general election
| Party | Candidate | Votes | % | ±% |
|---|---|---|---|---|
| Labour | Richard Rigg | 2,494 | 41.53 | 15.62 |
| Liberal | Solomon Hart Green | 2,263 | 37.69 | 4.54 |
| Conservative | Elias R. Levinson | 1,248 | 20.78 | -20.16 |
| Total valid votes | | 6,005 | – | – |
| Rejected | | N/A | – | |
| Eligible voters / Turnout | | 8,093 | 74.20 | -10.70 |
Source(s) Source: Manitoba. Chief Electoral Officer (1999). Statement of Votes for the 37th Provincial General Election, September 21, 1999 (PDF) (Report). Winnipeg: Elections Manitoba.

=== 1918 by-election ===
Manitoba provincial by-election, 1918
| Party | Candidate | Votes | % | ±% |
|---|---|---|---|---|
| Union | Robert Jacob | 2,912 | 55.22 | – |
| Independent | Elias R. Levinson | 2,361 | 44.78 | – |
| Total valid votes | | 5,273 | – | – |
| Rejected | | N/A | – | |
| Eligible voters / Turnout | | N/A | – | – |
Source(s) Source: Manitoba. Chief Electoral Officer (1999). Statement of Votes for the 37th Provincial General Election, September 21, 1999 (PDF) (Report). Winnipeg: Elections Manitoba.

=== 1949 ===
1949 Manitoba general election
| Party | Candidate | Votes | % | ±% |
|---|---|---|---|---|
| Liberal–Progressive | Frank Chester | 5,660 | 18.34 | – |
| Co-operative Commonwealth | Morris Gray | 4,917 | 15.94 | – |
| Labor–Progressive | Bill Kardash | 4,704 | 15.25 | – |
| Co-operative Commonwealth | John Hawryluk | 4,485 | 14.54 | – |
| Liberal–Progressive | John Michael "Big John" Kozoriz | 2,809 | 9.10 | – |
| Liberal–Progressive | Abraham L. "Abe" Simkin | 2,411 | 7.81 | – |
| Independent Liberal | William Scraba | 2,046 | 6.63 | – |
| Progressive Conservative | Stan Carrick | 1,384 | 4.49 | – |
| Total valid votes | | 28,416 | – | – |
| Rejected | | 329 | – | |
| Eligible voters / Turnout | | 46,649 | 61.62 | – |
Source(s) Source: Manitoba. Chief Electoral Officer (1999). Statement of Votes for the 37th Provincial General Election, September 21, 1999 (PDF) (Report). Winnipeg: Elections Manitoba.

=== 1953 ===
1953 Manitoba general election
| Party | Candidate | Votes | % | ±% |
|---|---|---|---|---|
| Co-operative Commonwealth | John Hawryluk | 4,783 | 17.08 | -13.39 |
| Co-operative Commonwealth | Morris Gray | 4,642 | 16.58 | -13.89 |
| Labor–Progressive | Bill Kardash | 4,271 | 15.25 | 0.01 |
| Liberal–Progressive | Alexander Turk | 3,134 | 11.19 | -24.07 |
| Liberal–Progressive | John Michael "Big John" Kozoriz | 3,082 | 11.01 | -24.25 |
| Progressive Conservative | Stanley Carrick | 2,373 | 8.47 | 3.99 |
| Independent Liberal | Ernest A. Brotman | 2,042 | 7.29 | 0.66 |
| Co-operative Commonwealth | Leonard Aylen | 1,325 | 4.73 | -25.74 |
| Total valid votes | | 25,652 | – | – |
| Rejected | | 503 | – | |
| Eligible voters / Turnout | | 44,887 | 58.27 | -3.35 |
Source(s) Source: Manitoba. Chief Electoral Officer (1999). Statement of Votes for the 37th Provincial General Election, September 21, 1999 (PDF) (Report). Winnipeg: Elections Manitoba.

== See also ==
- List of Manitoba provincial electoral districts
- Canadian provincial electoral districts
