= Swan River (electoral district) =

Provincial electoral district in Manitoba, Canada

Coordinates: 52.802°N 100.228°W

Manitoba electoral district

Provincial electoral district
- Legislature: Legislative Assembly of Manitoba
MLA
Rick Wowchuk
Progressive Conservative
- District created: 1903
- First contested: 1903
- Last contested: 2019

Demographics
- Population (2016): 22,220
- Electors (2019): 14,790
- Area (km²): 32,095
- Pop. density (per km²): 0.69

Swan River is a provincial electoral district of Manitoba, Canada. It was created in 1903, in what was then the northwestern corner of the province. Manitoba's borders expanded significantly in 1912, and Swan River is now located in the centre of the province, close to its western border with Saskatchewan. The division has seen several redistributions.

The riding is bordered to the north by The Pas, to the south by Dauphin-Roblin, to the east by Lake Winnipeg and to the west by the province of Saskatchewan. Lake Winnipegosis runs through the riding.

The community of Swan River is located in the riding's southwest corner. Other communities in the riding include Birch River, Ethelbert, Minitonas, Camperville, and Winnipegosis.

The riding's population in 1996 was 19,639. In 1999, the average family income was $35,209, and the unemployment rate was 10.70%. Twenty-eight per cent of the riding's residents are listed as low income, and over 25% of the population has less than a Grade Nine education (the third-highest rate in the province).

Thirty-six per cent of the riding's residents are aboriginal, and 10% are Ukrainian. Agriculture accounts for 22% of Swan River's economy, followed by the health and service sector at 12%.

Swan River's political identity has undergone a significant change in recent years. It was represented by the Progressive Conservative Party of Manitoba continuously for all but one term from 1932 to 1988, and was generally regarded as safe for the party during this period. The current MLA is Rick Wowchuk, who was elected in 2016, returning the seat to the Tories for the first time since 1990.

== Members of the Legislative Assembly ==
This riding has elected the following MLAs:

Parliament	Years	Member	Party
8th	1903–1907	James Robson	Conservative
9th	1907–1910	James Robson	Conservative
10th	1910–1914	Daniel D. McDonald	Liberal
11th	1914–1915	William Sims	Liberal
12th	1915–1920	William Sims	Liberal
13th	1920–1922	Robert Emmond	Farmer
14th	1922–1927	Robert Emmond	Progressive
15th	1927–1932	Andrew McCleary	Progressive
16th	1932–1936	George Renouf	Progressive Conservative
17th	1936–1941	George Renouf	Progressive Conservative
18th	1941–1945	George Renouf	Progressive Conservative
19th	1945–1949	George Renouf	Progressive Conservative
20th	1949–1953	George Renouf	Progressive Conservative
21st	1953–1958	George Renouf	Progressive Conservative
22nd	1958–1959	Albert Corbett	Progressive Conservative
23rd	1959–1962	Albert Corbett	Progressive Conservative
24th	1962–1966	James Bilton	Progressive Conservative
25th	1966–1969	James Bilton	Progressive Conservative
26th	1969–1973	James Bilton	Progressive Conservative
27th	1973–1977	James Bilton	Progressive Conservative
28th	1977–1981	Douglas Gourlay	Progressive Conservative
29th	1981–1986	Douglas Gourlay	Progressive Conservative
30th	1986–1988	Len Harapiak	New Democratic Party
31st	1988–1990	Parker Burrell	Progressive Conservative
32nd	1990–1995	Rosann Wowchuk	New Democratic Party
33rd	1995–1999	Rosann Wowchuk	New Democratic Party
34th	1999–2003	Rosann Wowchuk	New Democratic Party
35th	2003–2007	Rosann Wowchuk	New Democratic Party
36th	2007–2011	Rosann Wowchuk	New Democratic Party
37th	2011–2016	Ron Kostyshyn	New Democratic Party
38th	2016–2019	Rick Wowchuk	Progressive Conservative
39th	2019-	Rick Wowchuk	Progressive Conservative

== Electoral results ==
=== 1903 ===
1903 Manitoba general election
Party	Candidate	Votes	%
Conservative	James Wells Robson	503	64.90
Liberal	Almon James Cotton	272	35.10
Total valid votes		775	–
Rejected		N/A	–
Eligible voters / Turnout		942	82.27
Source(s) Source: Manitoba. Chief Electoral Officer (1999). Statement of Votes for the 37th Provincial General Election, September 21, 1999 (PDF) (Report). Winnipeg: Elections Manitoba.

=== 1907 ===
1907 Manitoba general election
Party	Candidate	Votes	%	±%
Conservative	James Wells Robson	387	52.65	-12.25
Liberal	J. P. Jones	348	47.35	12.25
Total valid votes		735	–	–
Rejected		N/A	–	
Eligible voters / Turnout		1,014	72.49	-9.79
Source(s) Source: Manitoba. Chief Electoral Officer (1999). Statement of Votes for the 37th Provincial General Election, September 21, 1999 (PDF) (Report). Winnipeg: Elections Manitoba.

=== 1910 ===
1910 Manitoba general election
Party	Candidate	Votes	%	±%
Liberal	Daniel D. McDonald	465	51.61	4.26
Conservative	James Wells Robson	436	48.39	-4.26
Total valid votes		901	–	–
Rejected		N/A	–	
Eligible voters / Turnout		1,113	80.95	8.47
Source(s) Source: Manitoba. Chief Electoral Officer (1999). Statement of Votes for the 37th Provincial General Election, September 21, 1999 (PDF) (Report). Winnipeg: Elections Manitoba.

=== 1914 ===
1914 Manitoba general election
Party	Candidate	Votes	%	±%
Liberal	William Henry Sims	594	51.43	-0.18
Conservative	William J. Stewart	561	48.57	0.18
Total valid votes		1,155	–	–
Rejected		N/A	–	
Eligible voters / Turnout		1,365	84.62	3.66
Source(s) Source: Manitoba. Chief Electoral Officer (1999). Statement of Votes for the 37th Provincial General Election, September 21, 1999 (PDF) (Report). Winnipeg: Elections Manitoba.

=== 1915 ===
1915 Manitoba general election
Party	Candidate	Votes	%	±%
Liberal	William Henry Sims	626	60.19	8.76
Independent	Daniel D. McDonald	414	39.81	–
Total valid votes		1,040	–	–
Rejected		N/A	–	
Eligible voters / Turnout		1,426	72.93	-11.68
Source(s) Source: Manitoba. Chief Electoral Officer (1999). Statement of Votes for the 37th Provincial General Election, September 21, 1999 (PDF) (Report). Winnipeg: Elections Manitoba.

=== 1920 ===
1920 Manitoba general election
Party	Candidate	Votes	%	±%
Farmer	Robert Emmond	1,163	68.13	–
Liberal	William Henry Sims	544	31.87	-28.32
Total valid votes		1,707	–	–
Rejected		N/A	–	
Eligible voters / Turnout		2,567	66.50	-6.43
Source(s) Source: Manitoba. Chief Electoral Officer (1999). Statement of Votes for the 37th Provincial General Election, September 21, 1999 (PDF) (Report). Winnipeg: Elections Manitoba.

=== 1922 ===
1922 Manitoba general election
Party	Candidate	Votes	%	±%
United Farmers	Robert Emmond	1,320	70.66	–
Conservative	Daniel Hawe	548	29.34	–
Total valid votes		1,868	–	–
Rejected		N/A	–	
Eligible voters / Turnout		2,876	64.95	-1.55
Source(s) Source: Manitoba. Chief Electoral Officer (1999). Statement of Votes for the 37th Provincial General Election, September 21, 1999 (PDF) (Report). Winnipeg: Elections Manitoba.

=== 1927 ===
1927 Manitoba general election
Party	Candidate	Votes	%	±%
Progressive	Andrew McCleary	1,347	46.42	–
Conservative	W. H. C. Hinchliffe	1,009	34.77	5.43
Liberal	William Henry Sims	546	18.81	–
Total valid votes		2,902	–	–
Rejected		N/A	–	
Eligible voters / Turnout		3,659	79.31	14.36
Source(s) Source: Manitoba. Chief Electoral Officer (1999). Statement of Votes for the 37th Provincial General Election, September 21, 1999 (PDF) (Report). Winnipeg: Elections Manitoba.

=== 1932 ===
1932 Manitoba general election
Party	Candidate	Votes	%	±%
Conservative	George Renouf	1,827	39.40	4.63
Independent	Steve Einarson	1,776	38.30	–
Liberal–Progressive	C. H. Goodman	1,034	22.30	–
Total valid votes		4,637	–	–
Rejected		N/A	–	
Eligible voters / Turnout		5,152	90.00	10.69
Source(s) Source: Manitoba. Chief Electoral Officer (1999). Statement of Votes for the 37th Provincial General Election, September 21, 1999 (PDF) (Report). Winnipeg: Elections Manitoba.

=== 1936 ===
1936 Manitoba general election
Party	Candidate	Votes	%	±%
Conservative	George Renouf	1,986	41.26	1.86
Liberal–Progressive	Daniel Baldwin	1,974	41.01	18.72
Independent Labour	Fred Holmes	853	17.72	–
Total valid votes		4,813	–	–
Rejected		146	–	
Eligible voters / Turnout		6,394	77.56	-12.45
Source(s) Source: Manitoba. Chief Electoral Officer (1999). Statement of Votes for the 37th Provincial General Election, September 21, 1999 (PDF) (Report). Winnipeg: Elections Manitoba.

=== 1941 ===
1941 Manitoba general election
Party	Candidate	Votes	%	±%
Conservative	George Renouf	2,894	78.17	36.91
Liberal–Progressive	W. J. Lamb	808	21.83	-19.19
Total valid votes		3,702	–	–
Rejected		29	–	
Eligible voters / Turnout		6,918	53.93	-23.63
Source(s) Source: Manitoba. Chief Electoral Officer (1999). Statement of Votes for the 37th Provincial General Election, September 21, 1999 (PDF) (Report). Winnipeg: Elections Manitoba.

=== 1945 ===
1945 Manitoba general election
Party	Candidate	Votes	%	±%
Progressive Conservative	George Renouf	2,519	63.50	–
Co-operative Commonwealth	Robert Niven	1,448	36.50	–
Total valid votes		3,967	–	–
Rejected		62	–	
Eligible voters / Turnout		7,187	56.06	2.13
Source(s) Source: Manitoba. Chief Electoral Officer (1999). Statement of Votes for the 37th Provincial General Election, September 21, 1999 (PDF) (Report). Winnipeg: Elections Manitoba.

=== 1949 ===
1949 Manitoba general election
Party	Candidate	Votes	%	±%
Progressive Conservative	George Renouf	3,352	76.22	12.72
Liberal–Progressive	Percival James McKay	1,046	23.78	–
Total valid votes		4,398	–	–
Rejected		68	–	
Eligible voters / Turnout		3,352	133.23	77.17
Source(s) Source: Manitoba. Chief Electoral Officer (1999). Statement of Votes for the 37th Provincial General Election, September 21, 1999 (PDF) (Report). Winnipeg: Elections Manitoba.

=== 1953 ===
1953 Manitoba general election
Party	Candidate	Votes	%	±%
Progressive Conservative	George Renouf	2,428	49.32	-26.90
Social Credit	Delbert LeRoy Downs	1,535	31.18	–
Co-operative Commonwealth	Stephen Einarson	776	15.76	–
Independent	George Edward Scalf	184	3.74	–
Total valid votes		4,923	–	–
Rejected		64	–	
Eligible voters / Turnout		7,532	66.21	-67.02
Source(s) Source: Manitoba. Chief Electoral Officer (1999). Statement of Votes for the 37th Provincial General Election, September 21, 1999 (PDF) (Report). Winnipeg: Elections Manitoba.

=== 1958 ===
1958 Manitoba general election
Party	Candidate	Votes	%	±%
Progressive Conservative	Albert H. C. Corbett	1,421	34.62	-14.70
Co-operative Commonwealth	Hilliard Ferriss	1,316	32.06	16.30
Liberal–Progressive	Ronald Robertson	1,083	26.38	–
Social Credit	Aldric S. Helps	285	6.94	-24.24
Total valid votes		4,105	–	–
Rejected		17	–	
Eligible voters / Turnout		6,001	68.69	2.48
Source(s) Source: Manitoba. Chief Electoral Officer (1999). Statement of Votes for the 37th Provincial General Election, September 21, 1999 (PDF) (Report). Winnipeg: Elections Manitoba.

=== 1959 ===
1959 Manitoba general election
Party	Candidate	Votes	%	±%
Progressive Conservative	Albert H. C. Corbett	2,292	50.83	16.22
Co-operative Commonwealth	Hilliard Ferriss	1,431	31.74	-0.32
Liberal–Progressive	Arvid Brust	786	17.43	-8.95
Total valid votes		4,509	–	–
Rejected		27	–	
Eligible voters / Turnout		5,947	76.27	7.59
Source(s) Source: Manitoba. Chief Electoral Officer (1999). Statement of Votes for the 37th Provincial General Election, September 21, 1999 (PDF) (Report). Winnipeg: Elections Manitoba.

=== 1962 ===
1962 Manitoba general election
Party	Candidate	Votes	%	±%
Progressive Conservative	James Bilton	2,350	57.71	6.88
Liberal	Elmer Cecil Sims	1,004	24.66	–
New Democratic	Maxwell G. Hofford	718	17.63	–
Total valid votes		4,072	–	–
Rejected		44	–	
Eligible voters / Turnout		6,086	67.63	-8.64
Source(s) Source: Manitoba. Chief Electoral Officer (1999). Statement of Votes for the 37th Provincial General Election, September 21, 1999 (PDF) (Report). Winnipeg: Elections Manitoba.

=== 1966 ===
1966 Manitoba general election
Party	Candidate	Votes	%	±%
Progressive Conservative	James Bilton	1,591	38.14	-19.57
Social Credit	Gerald Edgar Webb	1,185	28.41	–
Liberal	Claude Dunbar	793	19.01	-5.64
New Democratic	George Higgs	602	14.43	-3.20
Total valid votes		4,171	–	–
Rejected		34	–	
Eligible voters / Turnout		6,191	67.92	0.29
Source(s) Source: Manitoba. Chief Electoral Officer (1999). Statement of Votes for the 37th Provincial General Election, September 21, 1999 (PDF) (Report). Winnipeg: Elections Manitoba.

=== 1969 ===
1969 Manitoba general election
Party	Candidate	Votes	%	±%
Progressive Conservative	James Bilton	1,920	33.71	-4.43
New Democratic	Alex Filuk	1,757	30.85	16.42
Social Credit	Jerry Webb	1,252	21.98	-6.43
Liberal	Gordon Beaumont	766	13.45	-5.56
Total valid votes		5,695	–	–
Rejected		51	–	
Eligible voters / Turnout		8,026	71.59	3.67
Source(s) Source: Manitoba. Chief Electoral Officer (1999). Statement of Votes for the 37th Provincial General Election, September 21, 1999 (PDF) (Report). Winnipeg: Elections Manitoba.

=== 1973 ===
1973 Manitoba general election
Party	Candidate	Votes	%	±%
Progressive Conservative	James Bilton	3,370	50.10	16.39
New Democratic	Omar Lamb	2,669	39.68	8.83
Liberal	Vic Mearon	687	10.21	-3.24
Total valid votes		6,726	–	–
Rejected		48	–	
Eligible voters / Turnout		9,082	74.59	2.99
Source(s) Source: Manitoba. Chief Electoral Officer (1999). Statement of Votes for the 37th Provincial General Election, September 21, 1999 (PDF) (Report). Winnipeg: Elections Manitoba.

=== 1977 ===
1977 Manitoba general election
Party	Candidate	Votes	%	±%
Progressive Conservative	Doug Gourlay	3,909	55.15	5.05
New Democratic	Len Harapiak	3,179	44.85	5.17
Total valid votes		7,088	–	–
Rejected		13	–	
Eligible voters / Turnout		9,102	78.02	3.43
Source(s) Source: Manitoba. Chief Electoral Officer (1999). Statement of Votes for the 37th Provincial General Election, September 21, 1999 (PDF) (Report). Winnipeg: Elections Manitoba.

=== 1981 ===
1981 Manitoba general election
Party	Candidate	Votes	%	±%
Progressive Conservative	Doug Gourlay	3,884	50.86	-4.29
New Democratic	Len Harapiak	3,615	47.34	2.48
Progressive	George Simpson	138	1.81	–
Total valid votes		7,637	–	–
Rejected		30	–	
Eligible voters / Turnout		9,896	77.48	-0.54
Source(s) Source: Manitoba. Chief Electoral Officer (1999). Statement of Votes for the 37th Provincial General Election, September 21, 1999 (PDF) (Report). Winnipeg: Elections Manitoba.

=== 1986 ===
1986 Manitoba general election
Party	Candidate	Votes	%	±%
New Democratic	Len Harapiak	3,773	47.88	0.55
Progressive Conservative	Doug Gourlay	3,708	47.06	-3.80
Liberal	Donald Washenfelder	399	5.06	–
Total valid votes		7,880	–	–
Rejected		35	–	
Eligible voters / Turnout		9,872	80.18	2.70
Source(s) Source: Manitoba. Chief Electoral Officer (1999). Statement of Votes for the 37th Provincial General Election, September 21, 1999 (PDF) (Report). Winnipeg: Elections Manitoba.

=== 1988 ===
1988 Manitoba general election
Party	Candidate	Votes	%	±%
Progressive Conservative	Parker Burrell	4,115	50.10	3.04
New Democratic	Len Harapiak	3,446	41.95	-5.93
Liberal	Don Dennis	653	7.95	2.89
Total valid votes		8,214	–	–
Rejected		16	–	
Eligible voters / Turnout		9,807	83.92	3.74
Source(s) Source: Manitoba. Chief Electoral Officer (1999). Statement of Votes for the 37th Provincial General Election, September 21, 1999 (PDF) (Report). Winnipeg: Elections Manitoba.

=== 1990 ===
1990 Manitoba general election
Party	Candidate	Votes	%	±%
New Democratic	Rosann Wowchuk	3,872	45.69	3.74
Progressive Conservative	Parker Burrell	3,639	42.94	-7.15
Liberal	June Connolly-Payton	963	11.36	3.41
Total valid votes		8,474	–	–
Rejected		17	–	
Eligible voters / Turnout		11,585	73.29	-10.63
Source(s) Source: Manitoba. Chief Electoral Officer (1999). Statement of Votes for the 37th Provincial General Election, September 21, 1999 (PDF) (Report). Winnipeg: Elections Manitoba.

=== 1995 ===
1995 Manitoba general election
Party	Candidate	Votes	%	±%
New Democratic	Rosann Wowchuk	4,021	46.31	0.62
Progressive Conservative	Fred Betcher	3,985	45.89	2.95
Liberal	David Gray	559	6.44	-4.93
Independent	Nelson Contois	118	1.36	–
Total valid votes		8,683	–	–
Rejected		39	–	
Eligible voters / Turnout		11,643	74.91	1.62
Source(s) Source: Manitoba. Chief Electoral Officer (1999). Statement of Votes for the 37th Provincial General Election, September 21, 1999 (PDF) (Report). Winnipeg: Elections Manitoba.

=== 1999 ===
1999 Manitoba general election
Party	Candidate	Votes	%	±%	Expenditures
New Democratic	Rosann Wowchuk	4,931	54.97	8.66	$28,531.00
Progressive Conservative	Maxine Plesiuk	3,482	38.81	-7.08	$28,983.00
Manitoba	Wayne Klekta	558	6.22	–	$1,723.80
Total valid votes		8,971	–	–	
Rejected		21	–		
Eligible voters / turnout		12,671	70.97	-3.95	
Source(s) Source: Manitoba. Chief Electoral Officer (1999). Statement of Votes for the 37th Provincial General Election, September 21, 1999 (PDF) (Report). Winnipeg: Elections Manitoba.

=== 2003 ===
2003 Manitoba general election
Party	Candidate	Votes	%	±%	Expenditures
New Democratic	Rosann Wowchuk	4,701	63.00	8.03	$31,387.05
Progressive Conservative	Jason Shaw	2,223	29.79	-9.02	$9,138.20
Liberal	Russell McKay	538	7.21	–	$4,967.04
Total valid votes		7,462	–	–	
Rejected		29	–		
Eligible voters / Turnout		12,449	60.17	-10.79	
Source(s) Source: Manitoba. Chief Electoral Officer (2003). Statement of Votes for the 38th Provincial General Election, June 3, 2003 (PDF) (Report). Winnipeg: Elections Manitoba. "Election Returns: 38th General Election". Elections Manitoba. 2003.

=== 2007 ===
2007 Manitoba general election
Party	Candidate	Votes	%	±%	Expenditures
New Democratic	Rosann Wowchuk	4,522	58.40	-4.60	$32,305.27
Progressive Conservative	Maxine Plesiuk	2,915	37.65	7.86	$25,705.00
Liberal	Niomi Spence-Pranteau	306	3.95	-3.26	$340.30
Total valid votes		7,743	–	–	
Rejected		29	–		
Eligible voters / turnout		11,917	65.22	5.04	
Source(s) Source: Manitoba. Chief Electoral Officer (2007). Statement of Votes for the 39th Provincial General Election, May 22, 2007 (PDF) (Report). Winnipeg: Elections Manitoba."Election Returns: 39th General Election". Elections Manitoba. 2007.

=== 2011 ===
2011 Manitoba general election
Party	Candidate	Votes	%	±%	Expenditures
New Democratic	Ron Kostyshyn	4,280	56.15	-2.25	$34,323.01
Progressive Conservative	Dave Powell	3,078	40.38	2.74	$21,167.11
Liberal	Reynold Cook	264	3.46	-0.49	$284.81
Total valid votes		7,622	–	–	
Rejected		46	–		
Eligible voters / turnout		12,853	59.66	-5.56	
Source(s) Source: Manitoba. Chief Electoral Officer (2011). Statement of Votes for the 40th Provincial General Election, October 4, 2011 (PDF) (Report). Winnipeg: Elections Manitoba.

=== 2016 ===
2016 Manitoba general election
Party	Candidate	Votes	%	±%	Expenditures
Progressive Conservative	Rick Wowchuk	4,105	56.19	15.80	$27,515.00
New Democratic	Ron Kostyshyn	2,422	33.15	-23.00	$32,595.02
Liberal	Shayne Lynxleg	482	6.60	3.13	$131.25
Green	Dan Soprovich	297	4.07	–	$2,061.05
Total valid votes		7,306	–	–	$39,956.00
Rejected		25	–		
Eligible voters / turnout		12,182	60.18	0.52	
Source(s) Source: Manitoba. Chief Electoral Officer (2016). Statement of Votes for the 41st Provincial General Election, April 19, 2016 (PDF) (Report). Winnipeg: Elections Manitoba."Election Returns: 41st General Election". Elections Manitoba. 2016.

=== 2019 ===
2019 Manitoba general election
Party	Candidate	Votes	%	±%	Expenditures
Progressive Conservative	Rick Wowchuk	5,546	68.87	12.68	$9,962.06
New Democratic	Shelley Wiggins	2,084	25.88	-7.27	$6,225.59
Liberal	David Teffaine	423	5.25	-1.34	$0.00
Total valid votes		8,053	–	–	
Rejected		62	–		
Eligible voters / turnout		14,790	54.87	-5.31	
Source(s) Source: Manitoba. Chief Electoral Officer (2019). Statement of Votes for the 42nd Provincial General Election, September 10, 2019 (PDF) (Report). Winnipeg: Elections Manitoba.

=== 2023 ===
2023 Manitoba general election
Party	Candidate	Votes	%	±%	Expenditures
Progressive Conservative	Rick Wowchuk	4,801	62.91	-5.95	$11,614.36
New Democratic	Andy Maxwell	2,433	31.88	+6.00	$6,625.95
Keystone	Don McKenna	397	5.20	–	$1,323.84
Total valid votes/expense limit		7,631	98.29	–	$52,337.00
Total rejected and declined ballots		133	1.71	–	
Turnout		7,764	57.90	+3.03	
Eligible voters		13,409			
Progressive Conservative hold		Swing		-5.98	
Source(s) Source: Elections Manitoba

== Previous boundaries ==
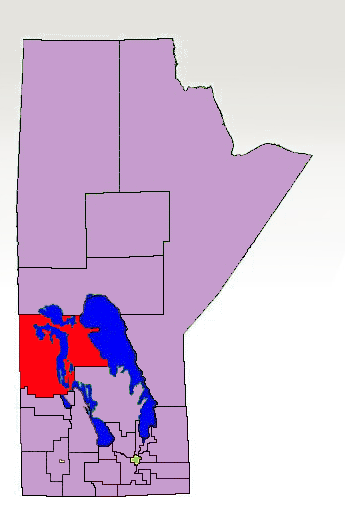
The 1998–2011 boundaries for the Swan River highlighted in red

== See also ==
- List of Manitoba provincial electoral districts
- Canadian provincial electoral districts
