= John Henry McConnell =

Politician in Manitoba, Canada (1860-1944)

John Henry McConnell (August 18, 1862 in Granton, Canada West – March 26, 1944 in Hamiota, Manitoba) was a politician in Manitoba, Canada. He served in the Legislative Assembly of Manitoba from 1914 to 1922, as a member of the Liberal Party.

The son of John McConnell and Catherine Delaney, McConnell was educated at common school in St. Mary's, Ontario. He first worked on a farm and then came to Manitoba in 1882. He acquired a Dominion Lands Act homestead in the Hamiota area which he later sold to purchase property in Winnipeg. After eight years in the wood business, McConnell entered the lumber business at Hamiota. He worked as an implement agent, auctioneer, undertaker and real estate agent. In 1887, he married Minnie Ann Brown. During his political career, McConnell lived in Hamiota. In religion, he was a Presbyterian.

He first ran for the Manitoba legislature in the 1899 provincial election, in the riding of Saskatchewan. He lost to Conservative candidate William Ferguson by fifteen votes. He ran again in the 1914 election, and defeated Ferguson by 398 votes in the renamed Hamiota constituency. The election was won by Rodmond Roblin's Conservatives, and McConnell sat in the legislature as a member of the opposition.

The Roblin administration was forced to resign amid a serious corruption scandal in 1915. Another general election was held in August 1915, which the Liberals won with a landslide majority. McConnell was easily re-elected, and served in the legislature as a backbench supporter of Tobias Norris's government.

The Liberals were reduced to a minority government in the 1920 provincial election, amid the rise of organized farmer and labour groups. McConnell was personally re-elected in Hamiota, defeating Ferguson by 347 votes. He ran again in the 1922 election, but lost to Thomas Wolstenholme of the United Farmers of Manitoba by 403 votes.

He died in Hamiota at the age of 81.
