= Frederic Newton =

Canadian politician (1870-1959)

Frederic Young Newton (April 7, 1870–May 17, 1959) was a politician in Manitoba, Canada. He served in the Legislative Assembly of Manitoba from 1911 to 1917, and again from 1922 to 1932. He was a member of the Conservative Party.

Newton was born in Cobourg, Ontario, the son of John White Newton and Mary McCullough, and was educated at Winnipeg Collegiate. In 1910, he served as reeve of the Rural Municipality of Shell River. In 1904, Newton married C.I. Gilchrist. He was mayor of the village of Roblin from 1920 to 1922 and from 1940 to 1943. He worked as a broker and was president of the Roblin Loan & Investment Co.

He was first elected to the Manitoba legislature in a by-election held on February 4, 1911, in the constituency of Russell, defeating Liberal William Valens by 265 votes. He was re-elected by 231 votes in the 1914 provincial election, in the constituency of Roblin. During this period, Newton served as a backbench supporter of Rodmond Roblin's government.

The Roblin government was forced to resign amid scandal in 1915, and the Conservatives were badly defeated in that year's provincial election. Newton was one of only five Conservatives to retain his seat, and was the only Conservative elected in an anglophone riding. He resigned his seat in 1917, after a report of the province's Paterson Commission found evidence of road frauds in his constituency.

Newton sought a return to the legislature in the 1920 provincial election, but lost to Farmer candidate Henry Robson Richardson by 104 votes. He tried again in the 1922 election, and this time defeated Richardson by nine votes. The election was won by the United Farmers of Manitoba, and Newton served on the opposition benches.

He was re-elected in the 1927 election, and again served as an opposition member. In the 1932 election, he lost to independent Progressive William Westwood by 609 votes.

Newton died in Roblin at the age of 89.
