= 1915 Manitoba general election =

- August 6, 1915

47 seats of the Legislative Assembly of Manitoba 24 seats needed for a majority
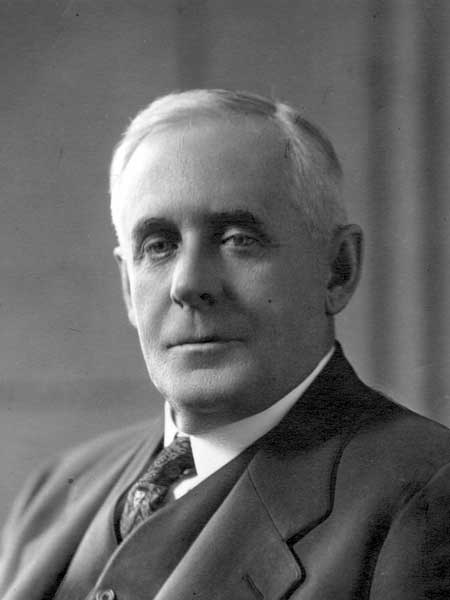

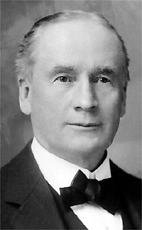
| | First party | Second party |
|---|---|---|
| Leader | Tobias Norris | James Albert Manning Aikins |
| Party | Liberal | Conservative |
| Leader since | 1910 | 1915 |
| Leader's seat | Lansdowne | Brandon City (lost re-election) |
| Last election | 20 | 28 |
| Seats won | 40 | 5 |
| Seat change | ▲20 | ▼23 |
| Percentage | 55.1% | 33.0% |
| Swing | ▲12.5pp | ▼13.9pp |
Premier before election
Rodmond Roblin
Conservative
Premier after election
Tobias Norris
Liberal

The 1915 Manitoba general election was held August 6, 1915 to elect members of the Legislative Assembly of the Province of Manitoba, Canada. Liberals under Norris took a slight majority of votes and won a landslide majority in the Legislature. They replaced the Conservative government that had ruled the province since 1899 but had lost power after investigation for corruption.

This election was held only one year after the previous general election of 1914. In that election, the governing Conservatives of premier Rodmond Roblin were confirmed in office with 28 seats out of 49. In early 1915, a commission appointed by the Lieutenant Governor found the government guilty of corruption in the tending of contracts for new legislative buildings.

Roblin denied the charges, but resigned as premier on May 12. Three days later, the lieutenant-governor called upon Tobias Norris, leader of the official opposition Liberals, to form a new administration. The house was quickly adjourned, and new elections were scheduled for August.

The primary issue of the campaign was corruption of the Roblin government. The pro-Liberal Manitoba Free Press ran numerous articles criticizing the practices of the Roblin government, and alleging that the "Roblin machine" still controlled the Conservative Party.

Liberals claimed they would manage the province's affairs in a businesslike rather than a partisan manner, an approach typified by Provincial Treasurer Edward Brown call for the province to "forget party for five years and get down to business".

Female suffrage was an issue in the campaign. Norris's Liberals promised they would enact female adult suffrage if elected to office. Due to this, Nellie McClung, who had returned to Manitoba from her home in Alberta, campaigned on behalf of Liberal candidates. The government gave votes to women in 1916, becoming the first province in Canada where women could vote. (Treaty Indians were still barred from voting until 1952.) The Liberal party's platform also promised direct legislation and plebiscites on public issues.

The question of prohibition was an issue at the time. The Liberal Party promised to hold a provincial referendum on the question. A referendum was held on March 3, 1916, and a majority voted in favour.

Facing unpopularity due to the corruption scandal, the Manitoba Conservatives chose federal Member of Parliament (MP) James Albert Manning Aikins as their new leader on July 15. Aikins had never served in the Roblin government and was regarded by many as free from the controversy that had forced the Conservatives to resign. In a further effort to separate themselves from the Roblin government, the Conservative party tried to change its name, referring to itself as the "Independent-Liberal-Conservative" party for this election. Liberals ridiculed this name change and sarcastically described the "new" Conservatives as the "Purity Party". The "Independent-Liberal-Conservative" name seems to have been dropped shortly after the election.

The election results were a disaster for Conservatives. They won only five seats out of 47, and Aikins lost by a considerable margin in Brandon City. The Liberals under Norris won a landslide majority with 40 seats, the largest victory in Manitoba history, although with barely more than half the vote.

Labourites made advances in the legislature. In the Winnipeg Centre district, Fred Dixon was re-elected, this time as an independent candidate with support from both Liberals and the Labour Representation Committee. The Social Democratic Party also won its first seat in the province, electing Richard Rigg to one of the two seats in north-end Winnipeg. The other seat was taken by Solomon Hart Green, the first Jew to serve in the Manitoba Legislature.

For this election (like the previous one in 1914) Winnipeg was divided into three districts, each having used two members, with each seat being filled in separate contests.

The Manitoba francophone-dominated constituencies continued to support candidates of the Conservative party. Four of the five Conservative MLAs were from francophone areas. Many francophone voters opposed Norris's plans to end provincial funding for denominational Catholic schools. Many also opposed Norris's plans for Prohibition and equal suffrage.

This was the last election before Winnipeg was made into a single ten-seat district, and Single transferable voting was brought into use.

== Electoral system ==
In this election Manitoba used a mixture of multi-member districts and single-member districts. In the multi-member districts - Winnipeg North, Winnipeg South and Winnipeg Centre - each member was elected in a separate contest through First past the post. There is little variance in the parties' vote tallies between the twin contests in each district.

In each single-member district the member was elected through First past the post.

== Results ==
| Party | Party leader | # of candidates | Members elected | | | Popular vote | | |
| Party | Party leader | # of candidates | 1914 | 1915 | % Change | # | % | % Change |
|---|---|---|---|---|---|---|---|---|
| Liberal | Tobias Norris | | 20 | 40 | +100% | | 55.1% | |
| Conservative | James Albert Manning Aikins | | 28 | 5 | -82.1% | | 33.0% | |
| Social Democratic | | | | 1 | | | 11.9% | |
| Independent/others | | | 1 | 1 | - | | 11.9% | |
| Total | | | 49 | 47 | -4.1% | | 100% | |

Popular vote
| Liberal | 55.10% |
| Conservative | 33.00% |
| Others | 11.90% |

Seats summary
| Liberal | 85.11% |
| Conservative | 10.64% |
| Others | 4.25% |

== Riding results ==
Arthur:

- (incumbent)John Williams (L) 815
- W.S. Kenner (C) 632

Assiniboia:

- John Wilton (L) 828
- William Bayley (Labour Representation Committee) 773
- (incumbent)John Thomas Haig (C) 590

Beautiful Plains:

- William Wood (L) 1115
- J. Harry Irwin (C) 918

Birtle:

- (incumbent)George Malcolm (L) 873
- S. Arnold (C) 422

Brandon City:

- Stephen Clement (L) 1914
- James Albert Manning Aikins (C) 1213

Carillon:

- Albert Prefontaine (C) 629
- (incumbent)Thomas B. Molloy (L) 605

Cypress:

- Andrew Myles (L) 851
- (incumbent)George Steel (C) 789

Dauphin:

- William Harrington (L) 739
- (incumbent)William Buchanan (C) 637
- J.M. McQuay (Ind) 233

Deloraine:

- (incumbent)Robert Thornton (L) 1146
- John C. Walker Reid (C) 851

Dufferin:

- Edward August (L) 1134
- Andrew S. Argue (C) 848

Elmwood:

- Thomas Glendenning Hamilton (L) 2319
- Donald Munro (C) 866

Emerson:

- John David Baskerville (L) 1181
- G. Coulter (C) 460

Gilbert Plains:

- William Findlater (L) 1383
- (incumbent)Sam Hughes (C) 792

Gimli:

- Taras Ferley (L-Ind) 1172
- (incumbent)Sveinn Thorvaldson (C) 562

(Einar Jonasson had been nominated as the official Liberal candidate, but withdrew.)

Gladstone:

- (incumbent)James Armstrong (L) 1154
- A. Singleton (C) 484

Glenwood:

- (incumbent)James Breakey (L) 1091
- John Perdue (C) 636

Hamiota:

- (incumbent)John Henry McConnell (L) 1063
- J. Moss Fraser (C) 596

Iberville:

- (incumbent)Aime Benard (C) 527
- James H. Black (L) 400

Kildonan and St. Andrews:

- George Prout (L) 1295
- R. Sanders (C) 754

Killarney:

- Samuel Hayden (L) 779
- (incumbent)George Lawrence (C) 656

Lakeside:

- Charles Duncan McPherson (L) 863
- (incumbent)John J. Garland (C) 700

Lansdowne:

- (incumbent)Tobias Norris (L) 1334
- W.J. Cundy (C) 592

La Verendrye:

- Philippe Talbot (L) 713
- (incumbent)Jean-Baptiste Lauzon (C) 558

Manitou:

- George Thomas Armstrong (L) 1090
- W.H. Sharpe (C) 1006

Minnedosa:

- (incumbent)George Grierson (L) 1173
- James Muir (C) 654

Morden and Rhineland:

- (incumbent)Valentine Winkler (L) 1180
- William Johnston Tupper (C) 712

Morris:

- (incumbent)Jacques Parent (C) 740
- William Molloy (L) 683

Mountain:

- (incumbent)James Baird (L) 1331
- John T. Dale (C) 419

Norfolk:

- (incumbent)John Graham (L) 933
- Robert F. Lyons (C) 770

Portage la Prairie:

- (incumbent)Ewan McPherson (L) 1065
- Fawcett Taylor (C) 807

Roblin:

- (incumbent)Frederic Newton (C) 714
- William Angus (L) 609

Rockwood:

- Arthur Lobb (L) 1275
- Thomas Scott (C) 639

Russell:

- William Wilber Wilfred Wilson (L) 1033
- J.P. Laycock (C) 614

St. Boniface:

- Joseph Dumas (L) 921
- J.A. Beaupre (C) 790
- J.P. Howden (Ind L) 640

St. Clements:

- (incumbent)Donald Ross (L/Ind) 1014
- Thomas Hay (C) 489

St. George:

- Skuli Sigfusson (L) 1291
- Paul Reykdal (C) 831

Ste. Rose:

- (incumbent)Joseph Hamelin (C) 443
- Z.H. Rheaume (L) 414
- A. McLeod (Ind) 266

Swan River:

- (incumbent)William Sims (L) 626
- Daniel D. McDonald (C) 414

Turtle Mountain:

- George William McDonald (L) 687
- (incumbent)James Johnson (C) 651

Virden:

- (incumbent)George Clingan (L) 1181
- R.A. Knight (C) 772

=== Winnipeg ===
Winnipeg North "A":

- Robert Newton Lowery (L) 2443
- Arthur Beech (SDP) 2248
- (incumbent)Joseph P. Foley (C) 1490

Winnipeg North "B":

- Richard Rigg (SDP) 2494
- Solomon Hart Green (L) 2263
- E.R. Levinson (C) 1248

Winnipeg Centre "A":

- (incumbent)Thomas Herman Johnson (L) 6763
- A.J. Norquay (C) 2346

Winnipeg Centre "B":

- (incumbent) Fred Dixon (Ind, formerly Lib-Lab MLA) 6443
- H.M. Hanneson (C) 2048
- George Armstrong (SPC) 804

Winnipeg South "A":

- (incumbent)Albert Hudson (L) 5986
- W.J. Boyd (C) 2011

Winnipeg South "B":

- (incumbent)William Parrish (L) 5635
- Lendrum McMeans (C) 2303

== Deferred elections ==
The Pas, August 25, 1915:

- Edward Brown (L) accl.

Horace Halcrow had been nominated by the Conservatives to contest this riding, but withdrew before the election. Halcrow had been Manitoba's chief game warden under the Roblin government.

== Post-election changes ==
Rupertsland (new constituency), September 16, 1916:

- John Morrison (Ind-L) accl.

Iberville (res. Aime Benard, 1917), November 1, 1917:

- Arthur Boivin (C) elected

Roblin (res. Frederic Newton, 1917), November 19, 1917:

- William Westwood (Ind-L) elected
- Irwin L. Mitchell (L)

(A Winnipeg Free Press report from November 20, 1917 shows Westwood winning by 186 votes, with one poll yet to declare. This was likely the first provincial election where Manitoba women cast votes.)

Morris (dep. Jacques Parent, 1917; no by-election)

Minnedosa (George Grierson to cabinet, November 10, 1917), November 30, 1917:

- George Grierson (L) elected

Winnipeg North "B" (res. Richard Rigg, 1917), January 15, 1918:

- Robert Jacob (Union-L) 2923
- E.R. Levinson (Ind) 2251

(Numbers taken from the Winnipeg Free Press.)

Rhineland (dec. Valentine Winkler, June 7, 1920; no by-election)
