= 1914 Manitoba general election =

- July 10, 1914

49 seats of the Legislative Assembly of Manitoba 25 seats needed for a majority
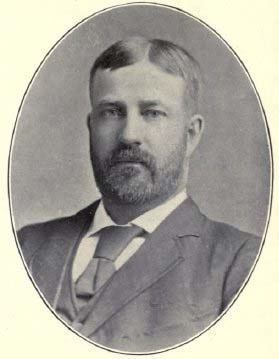

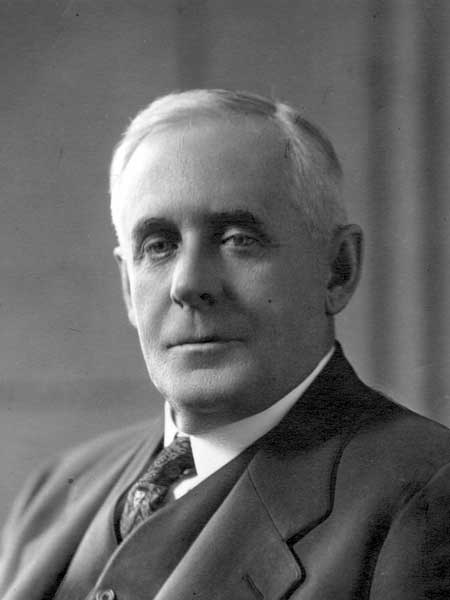
	First party	Second party
Leader	Rodmond Roblin	Tobias Norris
Party	Conservative	Liberal
Leader since	1900	1910
Leader's seat	Dufferin	Lansdowne
Last election	28	13
Seats won	28	20
Seat change	0	▲7
Popular vote	46.6%	42.8%
Swing	▼4.2pp	▼1.4pp
Premier before election
Rodmond Roblin
Conservative
Premier after election
Rodmond Roblin
Conservative

The 1914 Manitoba general election was held on July 10, 1914 to elect members of the Legislative Assembly of the Province of Manitoba, Canada.

The result was a fifth consecutive majority government for the Conservative Party, led by premier Rodmond Roblin. The result, however, was much closer than in the previous general elections of 1903, 1907 and 1910.

Former Conservative leader Hugh John Macdonald believed that the party was hurt by its 1912 amendments to the Manitoba education code. Although Education Minister George R. Coldwell insisted the amendments were only meant to clarify existing provisions, many voters believed the Roblin government wanted to re-introduce funding for separate Roman Catholic schools. The government was also weakened by a corruption scandal involving the construction of new legislative buildings.

The Conservatives won twenty-eight seats, against twenty for the Liberal Party under Tobias Norris. Independent candidate Fred Dixon was also elected, with support from both the Liberals and the Labour Representation Committee. This election re-established the Liberals as a credible government-in-waiting.

Early in 1915, Roblin's administration was forced to resign from office after a report commissioned by the Lieutenant Governor found his government guilty of corruption in the awarding of contracts for new legislative buildings. Norris's Liberals were called to form a new administration, although they did not hold a majority of seats in the legislature. A new election was held, which the Liberals won in a landslide.

== Electoral system ==
In this election Manitoba used a mixture of multi-member districts and single-member districts. Two MLAs were elected in each of the multi-member districts - Winnipeg North, Winnipeg South and Winnipeg Centre. In each district, each member was elected in a separate contest through First past the post.

In each single-member district the member was elected through First past the post.

== Results ==
Party	Party leader	# of candidates	Seats			Popular vote		
Party	Party leader	# of candidates	1910	Elected	% Change	#	%	% Change
Conservative	Rodmond Roblin		28	28	-	68,352	46.6	
Liberal	Tobias Norris		13	20	+53.8%	62,798	42.8	
Independent			-	1	-	8,511	5.8	
Labour			-	0	-	7,143	4.8	
Total			41	49	+19.5%	146,804	100	

The appearance of "third party" candidates presaged later developments when farmers and workers in such bodies as Independent Labour Party, the CCF and the NDP would play larger role in elections. Note two Labour Representation League candidates, in Assiniboia and Elmwood, and candidacy of Ferley (later ILP councillor on Winnipeg city council) in Mountain, as well as the successful campaign of Independent (Labour) candidate Fred Dixon, who would serve nine years as MLA.

Popular vote
Conservative	46.56%
Liberal	42.77%
Others	10.67%

Seats summary
Conservative	57.14%
Liberal	40.82%
Others	2.04%

== Riding results ==
Arthur:

- John Williams (L) 766
- (incumbent)Amos Lyle (C) 700

Assiniboia:

- John Thomas Haig (C) 1239
- John W. Wilton (L) 965
- W.J. Bartlett (Labour Representation Committee) 501

Beautiful Plains:

- (incumbent)James H. Howden (C) 1102
- William R. Wood (L) 1070

Birtle:

- (incumbent)George J.H. Malcolm (L) 892
- W.M. Taylor (C) 583

Brandon City:

- (incumbent)George R. Coldwell (C) 1897
- Stephen Emmett Clement (L) 1734

Carillon:

- Thomas B. Molloy (L) 659
- (incumbent)Albert Prefontaine (C) 652

Churchill and Nelson:

- George R. Ray (C) accl.

Cypress:

- (incumbent)George Steel (C) 852
- James Christie Sr. (L) 836

Dauphin:

- William Buchanan (C) 1026
- J. Seale (L) 710

Deloraine:

- Robert S. Thornton (L) 1127
- (incumbent)John C. Walker Reid (C) 923

Dufferin:

- (incumbent)Rodmond Roblin (C) 1204
- Edward August (L) 1065

Elmwood:

- Harry Mewhirter (C) 1901
- Thomas Glendenning Hamilton (L) 1537
- R.S. Ward (Labour Representation Committee/) 508

Emerson:

- (incumbent)David McFadden (C) 1032
- George Walton (L) 986

Gilbert Plains:

- (incumbent)Sam Hughes (C) 1471
- G.D. Shortreed (L) 996

Gimli:

- Sveinn Thorvaldson (C) 1045
- Einar Jonasson (L) 461
- Taras Ferley (L-Ind) 264

Gladstone:

- (incumbent)James W. Armstrong (L) 1239
- S. Singleton (C) 943

Glenwood:

- James W. Breakey (L) 1078
- A.L. Young (C) 906

Grand Rapids (17 August):

- Hugh Armstrong (C) 271
- A. la Rose (L) 12

Hamiota:

- John Henry McConnell (L) 1134
- (incumbent)William Ferguson (C) 736

Iberville:

- (incumbent)Aime Benard (C) accl.

Kildonan & St. Andrews:

- (incumbent)Walter Montague (C) 1087
- George Prout (L) 1086

Killarney:

- (incumbent)George Lawrence (C) 758
- Samuel Hayden (L) 690

La Verendrye:

- Jean-Baptiste Lauzon (C) 778
- Philippe Adjutor Talbot (L) 550

Lakeside:

- John J. Garland (C) 838
- (incumbent)Charles D. McPherson (L) 828

Lansdowne:

- (incumbent)Tobias Norris (L) 1371
- W.J. Cundy (C) 927

Manitou:

- (incumbent)James Morrow (C) 1099
- I.H. Davidson (L) 1029

Minnedosa:

- George Grierson (L) 1174
- William B. Waddell (C) 965

Morden and Rhineland:

- (incumbent)Valentine Winkler (L) 1073
- William Johnston Tupper (C) 941

Morris:

- Jacques Parent (C) 920
- (incumbent)William Molloy (L) 658

Mountain:

- (incumbent)James Baird (L) 1200
- John T. Dale (C) 598
- A.D. Craig (Ind) 306 (His grass-roots platform, which included Direct Legislation and Proportional representation, described in Grain Growers Guide, May 4, 1914, p. 27)

Norfolk:

- John Graham (L) 911
- (incumbent)Robert F. Lyons (C) 843

Portage la Prairie:

- Ewan McPherson (L) 1030
- (incumbent)Hugh Armstrong (C) 1020

Roblin:

- (incumbent)Frederic Newton (C) 802
- T. McLennan (L) 571

Rockwood:

- (incumbent)Isaac Riley (C) 1103
- Arthur Lobb (L) 1044

Russell:

- Donald C. McDonald (L) 892
- E. Graham (C) 862

St. Boniface:

- (incumbent)Joseph Bernier (C) 1603
- L.A. Delorme (L) 1259

St. Clements:

- (incumbent)Donald A. Ross (L) 1025
- Thomas Hay (C) 887

St. George:

- (incumbent)Edmund L. Taylor (C) 1198
- Skuli Sigfusson (L) 1097

Ste. Rose:

- Joseph Hamelin (C) 596
- John A. Campbell (L) 536

Swan River:

- William H. Sims (L) 594
- W.J. Stewart (C) 561

The Pas (27 July):

- (incumbent)Robert Orok (C) accl.

Turtle Mountain:

- (incumbent)James Johnson (C) 707
- George William McDonald (L) 645

Virden:

- George Clingan (L) 1135
- (incumbent)Harvey C. Simpson (C) 1050

Winnipeg Centre "A":

- (incumbent)Thomas Herman Johnson (L) 7998
- A.J. Andrews (C) 6948
- William H. Hoop (SPC) 953

Winnipeg Centre "B":

- Fred Dixon (Ind [Lib-Lab]) 8205
- F.J.G. McArthur (C) 6692
- George Armstrong (SPC) 928

Winnipeg North "A":

- Joseph P. Foley (C) 3135
- J. Willoughby (L) 2816
- Arthur Beech (SDP) 1921

Winnipeg North "B":

- Daniel McLean (C) 3268
- Robert Newton Lowery (L) 2645
- Herman Saltzman (SDP) 2068

Winnipeg South "A":

- Albert B. Hudson (L) 5861
- (incumbent)Lendrum McMeans (C) 4863

Winnipeg South "B":

- William L. Parrish (L) 5812
- Harry W. Whitlaw (C) 4902

== Post-election changes ==
Dufferin (res. Rodmond Roblin, May 12, 1915)
