= William Henry Sims =

Canadian politician (1872–1955)

William Henry Sims (January 6, 1872 – 1955) was a politician in Manitoba, Canada. He served in the Legislative Assembly of Manitoba from 1914 to 1920 as a member of the Liberal Party.

== Biography ==
Sims was born in Fergus, Ontario, the son of William A. Sims and Clara Last, and was educated at Brant School near Stonewall and in Winnipeg, Manitoba. He received a Teachers' Certificate, and also worked as a farmer. He came to the Swan River valley during the early 1900s. Sims served as a councillor in the Rural Municipality of Swan River from 1907 to 1913, and was the community's reeve in 1914. He was also president of the local Agricultural Society for many years. Sims was married twice: first to Catherine Emily Marsh and then, in 1909, to Christina S. M. Mounsey.

He was first elected to the Manitoba legislature in the 1914 provincial election, defeating Conservative candidate W.J. Stewart by thirty-three votes in the constituency of Swan River. The Conservatives won this election, and Sims served with his party in opposition.

The Conservative administration was forced to resign in 1915 as the result of a corruption scandal, and the Liberals were called to form government. A new election was called, which the Liberals won in a landslide. Sims was re-elected by an increased majority, and served as a backbench supporter of premier Tobias Norris's government for the next five years.

He was defeated in the 1920 provincial election, losing to Farmer candidate Robert Emmond by 619 votes. He sought to return to the legislature in the 1927 election, but finished third against Progressive candidate Andrew McCleary.
