= Social Democratic Party of Canada (in Manitoba) =

When the Social Democratic Party of Canada broke away from the Socialist Party of Canada in 1911, many Winnipeg SPC members joined the new organization. The new party's platform was written by three residents of the city (Richard Rigg, Herman Saltzman and Jacob Penner), and it has been estimated that nearly 20% of the SDPC's total membership lived in Winnipeg during the early 1910s.

The party was more pragmatic than the SPC, and cooperated with reformist labour groups. It benefited from the relative weakness of the SPC in Winnipeg following the provincial election of 1910. The SPC had contributed to reformist Fred Dixon's defeat in this election, and was shunned by many in the city's trade union movement as such.

In the provincial election of 1914, the SDPC ran Arthur Beech and Herman Saltzman as candidate's for Winnipeg North's two ridings. Both candidates were defeated, due in part to the SDPC's insistence that further immigration to the city be curtailed in a time of high unemployment (Winnipeg North was home to many recent immigrants).

The party fared better in the election of 1915, when Richard Rigg was elected for Winnipeg North's second seat. Rigg had defended the city's immigrant population in the past, and was elected despite strong SPC opposition. Beech finished a close second in the other Winnipeg North seat. Both of the SDPC's candidates were also endorsed by the Labour Representation Committee, a reformist organization.

Rigg did not remain in parliament long, resigning in 1917 to contest Winnipeg North at the federal level. This time, he was endorsed by reformist labourites and Liberal supporters of Wilfrid Laurier because of his opposition to conscription. Support for the war was strong in western Canada, however, and Rigg was defeated by a supporter of Robert Borden's Union government.

Labour radicalism in Winnipeg increased after the General Strike in 1919. In the following year's provincial election, the Dominion Labour Party, SPC and SDPC were able to present a united slate of candidates in Winnipeg, running a combined total of ten candidates for the city's ten seats (which were determined by preferential balloting). John Queen was the sole Social Democrat on the ballot, and was declared elected to the legislature.

The SPDC joined the Federated Labour Party in 1920. Queen was re-elected as an "Independent Workers" candidate in 1922, and became leader of the province's Independent Labour Party caucus the following year.
