= Kildonan (electoral district) =

Defunct provincial electoral district in Manitoba, Canada

Coordinates: 49.955°N 97.105°W

Manitoba electoral district
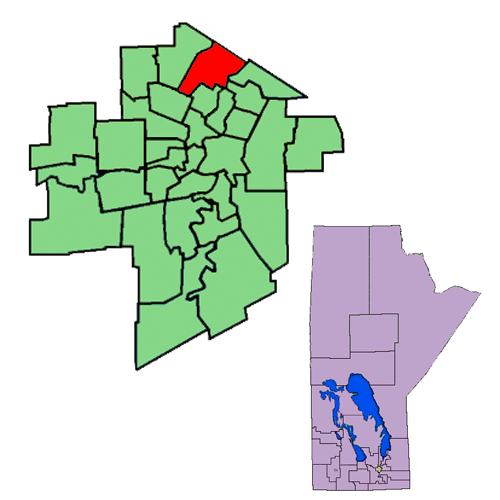

Defunct provincial electoral district
- Legislature: Legislative Assembly of Manitoba
- District created: 1957
- First contested: 1958
- Last contested: 2016

Kildonan was a provincial electoral district of Manitoba, Canada. The boundaries for the riding maintained their location through the 2008 redistribution.

== History ==
=== Kildonan (1870–1899) ===
The original Kildonan riding was created at the time of the province's establishment in 1870. It was dominated by Manitoba's "old settler" population (i.e., English-speaking families who had lived in the Red River Colony for many years before the province's creation). There was a large "mixed blood" aboriginal population in the riding, and many of its residents were also of Scottish or partly Scottish ancestry. From 1886 to 1888, the riding was incorporated into "Kildonan and St. Paul" riding.

Kildonan was a hotly contested riding between the Conservatives and Liberals following the establishment of party government in 1888. In 1899, it was dissolved into the riding of "Kildonan and St. Andrews".

=== Kildonan and St. Andrews (1920–1958) ===
From 1920 to 1927, the Kildonan and St. Andrews riding was represented by Labour Member of the Legislative Assembly (MLA) Charles Tanner. Otherwise, it continued to return Liberals and Conservatives until being merged into "Kildonan-Transcona" in 1949. After that time, it was generally considered a safe riding for the Co-operative Commonwealth Federation.

=== Kildonan-Transcona (1949–1958) ===
Created out of Kildonan and St. Andrews, Winnipeg, St. Clements, and Springfield for the 1949 election. Was abolished prior to the 1958 election into Seven Oaks, Kildonan, Elmwood, Radisson, and Springfield.

=== Kildonan (1958–2019) ===
A riding with the name Kildonan was reestablished in 1957, and formally came into being in the provincial election of 1958. It was located in the northeastern part of the current city of Winnipeg, The Kildonan riding that existed from the 1958 election up to the election of 1981 was located in the East Kildonan area on the east side of the Red River. The riding of Kildonan that existed since 1981 in northwest Winnipeg had completely different boundaries from the old Kildonan riding as this new Kildonan riding was carved out of the old Seven Oaks riding on the west side of the Red River. This new riding was bordered on the east by River East and Rossmere, to the south by St. Johns and Burrows, to the north by Gimli, and to the west by The Maples.

The riding's population in 1996 was 19,522. In 1999, the average family income was $54,381, and the unemployment rate was 6.8%. Almost 18% of the population was above 65 years of age by 2016. Kildonan had a large immigrant population (23% of the total population in 1999), and was ethnically diverse. Ukrainians made up 14% of the riding's population; a further 11% were Jewish, 7% Polish, and 3% Italian. Kildonan's residents were primarily middle and upper-income. Manufacturing accounted for 16% of industry in the riding, with a further 15% in the service sector.

The seat was generally regarded as safe for the New Democratic Party. The Progressive Conservatives won the former Kildonan on the (east side of the Red River) in 1962 (by 4 votes in the 1962 election) and the Liberals won the Kildonan riding on the (west side of the Red River) in 1988. In both cases, the NDP recaptured the seat after a single term.

Beginning with the 2019 Manitoba general election, the Kildonan riding was dissolved and much of its constituency was redistributed to the new riding of Kildonan-River East, which also took in parts of St. Johns and the now-defunct River East riding. Kildonan's last MLA was Nic Curry, a young former officer in the Canadian Armed Forces Reserve.

== Members of the Legislative Assembly ==
=== Kildonan (1870–1899) ===
Name	Party	Took office	Left office
John Sutherland	Opposition/Canadian Party	1870	1874
vacant		1874	1875
John Sutherland	Opposition	1875	1878
Alexander Sutherland	Opposition	1878	1879
	Government/Liberal-Conservative	1879	1884
John MacBeth(+)	Government/Conservative	1884	1888
John Norquay	Conservative	1888	1889
Thomas Norquay	Conservative	1890	1892
John James Bird	Liberal	1892	1896
Hector Sutherland	Conservative	1896	1899

(+) From 1886 to 1888, the riding was incorporated into Kildonan and St. Paul.

=== Kildonan and St. Andrews (1920–1927) ===
Name	Party	Took office	Left office
Orton Grain	Liberal-Conservative	1899	1903
M.J. O'Donahoe	Liberal	1903	1907
Orton Grain	Conservative	1907	1913
Walter Montague	Conservative	1913	1915
George Prout	Liberal	1915	1920
Charles Tanner	Dominion Labour	1920	1920
	Independent Labour Party	1920	1927
James McLenaghen	Conservative/Progressive Conservative	1927	1949

=== Kildonan-Transcona (1949–1958) ===
Name	Party	Took office	Left office
George Olive	Co-operative Commonwealth	1949	1953
Russell Paulley	Co-operative Commonwealth	1953	1958

=== Kildonan (1961–2019) ===
Name	Party	Took office	Left office
A.J. Reid	Co-operative Commonwealth	1958	1961
	New Democrat	1961	1962
James Mills	Progressive Conservative	1962	1966
Peter Fox	New Democrat	1966	1981
Mary Beth DolinNew Kildonan Riding- completely different boundaries	New Democrat	1981	1985
Marty Dolin	New Democrat	1985	1988
Gulzar Singh Cheema	Liberal	1988	1990
David Chomiak	New Democrat	1990	2016
Nic Curry	Progressive Conservative	2016	2019

== Electoral results ==
=== 1870 ===
1870 Manitoba general election
Party	Candidate	Votes	%
Opposition	John Sutherland	38	55.07%
Government	David Matheson	31	44.93%
Total		69	–
Eligible voters / Turnout		N/A	–
Rejected		N/A	–
Source(s) Source:Manitoba. Chief Electoral Officer (1999). Statement of Votes for the 37th Provincial General Election, September 21, 1999 (PDF) (Report). Winnipeg: Elections Manitoba. pp. 211–277.

=== 1874 ===
1874 Manitoba general election
Party	Candidate	Votes	%	±%
Opposition	John Sutherland	49	50.00%	-5.07%
Undeclared	John Fraser	49	50.00%	–
Total		98	–	–
Eligible voters / Turnout		N/A	–	–
Rejected		N/A	–	–
Source(s) Source:Manitoba. Chief Electoral Officer (1999). Statement of Votes for the 37th Provincial General Election, September 21, 1999 (PDF) (Report). Winnipeg: Elections Manitoba. pp. 211–277.

=== 1875 by-election ===
Manitoba provincial by-election, 1875
Party	Candidate	Votes	%	±%
Unknown	John Sutherland	Acclaimed	–	–
Total			–	–
Eligible voters / Turnout		N/A	–	–
Rejected		N/A	–	–
Source(s) Source:Manitoba. Chief Electoral Officer (1999). Statement of Votes for the 37th Provincial General Election, September 21, 1999 (PDF) (Report). Winnipeg: Elections Manitoba. pp. 211–277.

=== 1878 ===
1878 Manitoba general election
Party	Candidate	Votes	%	±%
Undeclared	Alexander Sutherland	78	65.00%	–
Undeclared	John Sutherland	42	35.00%	–
Total		120	–	–
Eligible voters / Turnout		151	79.47%	–
Rejected		N/A	–	–
Source(s) Source:Manitoba. Chief Electoral Officer (1999). Statement of Votes for the 37th Provincial General Election, September 21, 1999 (PDF) (Report). Winnipeg: Elections Manitoba. pp. 211–277.

=== 1879 ===
1879 Manitoba general election
Party	Candidate	Votes	%	±%
Government	Alexander Sutherland	107	60.80%	-4.20%
Undeclared	John Sutherland	69	39.20%	4.20%
Total		176	–	–
Eligible voters / Turnout		N/A	–	–
Rejected		N/A	–	–
Source(s) Source:Manitoba. Chief Electoral Officer (1999). Statement of Votes for the 37th Provincial General Election, September 21, 1999 (PDF) (Report). Winnipeg: Elections Manitoba. pp. 211–277.

=== 1882 by-election ===
Manitoba provincial by-election, 1882
Party	Candidate	Votes	%	±%
Conservative	Alexander Sutherland	Acclaimed	–	–
Total			–	–
Eligible voters / Turnout		N/A	–	–
Rejected		N/A	–	–
Source(s) Source:Manitoba. Chief Electoral Officer (1999). Statement of Votes for the 37th Provincial General Election, September 21, 1999 (PDF) (Report). Winnipeg: Elections Manitoba. pp. 211–277.

=== 1883 ===
1883 Manitoba general election
Party	Candidate	Votes	%	±%
Conservative	Alexander Sutherland	100	57.14%	–
Liberal	John Sutherland	75	42.86%	–
Total		175	–	–
Eligible voters / Turnout		N/A	–	–
Rejected		N/A	–	–
Source(s) Source:Manitoba. Chief Electoral Officer (1999). Statement of Votes for the 37th Provincial General Election, September 21, 1999 (PDF) (Report). Winnipeg: Elections Manitoba. pp. 211–277.

=== 1884 by-election ===
Manitoba provincial by-election, 1884
Party	Candidate	Votes	%	±%
Conservative	John MacBeth	109	64.50%	7.35%
Liberal	J. Thompson	60	35.50%	-7.35%
Total		169	–	–
Eligible voters / Turnout		N/A	–	–
Rejected		N/A	–	–
Source(s) Source:Manitoba. Chief Electoral Officer (1999). Statement of Votes for the 37th Provincial General Election, September 21, 1999 (PDF) (Report). Winnipeg: Elections Manitoba. pp. 211–277.

=== 1886 ===
1886 Manitoba general election
Party	Candidate	Votes	%	±%
Conservative	John MacBeth	194	54.96%	-9.54%
Liberal	John Sutherland	159	45.04%	9.54%
Total		353	–	–
Eligible voters / Turnout		N/A	–	–
Rejected		N/A	–	–
Source(s) Source:Manitoba. Chief Electoral Officer (1999). Statement of Votes for the 37th Provincial General Election, September 21, 1999 (PDF) (Report). Winnipeg: Elections Manitoba. pp. 211–277.

=== 1888 ===
1888 Manitoba general election
Party	Candidate	Votes	%	±%
Conservative	John Norquay	305	50.16%	-4.79%
Liberal	Duncan MacArthur	303	49.84%	4.79%
Total		608	–	–
Eligible voters / Turnout		N/A	–	–
Rejected		N/A	–	–
Source(s) Source:Manitoba. Chief Electoral Officer (1999). Statement of Votes for the 37th Provincial General Election, September 21, 1999 (PDF) (Report). Winnipeg: Elections Manitoba. pp. 211–277.

=== 1890 by-election ===
Manitoba provincial by-election, 1890
Party	Candidate	Votes	%	±%
Conservative	Thomas Norquay	325	69.59%	19.43%
Unknown	James Taylor	142	30.41%	–
Total		467	–	–
Eligible voters / Turnout		N/A	–	–
Rejected		N/A	–	–
Source(s) Source:Manitoba. Chief Electoral Officer (1999). Statement of Votes for the 37th Provincial General Election, September 21, 1999 (PDF) (Report). Winnipeg: Elections Manitoba. pp. 211–277.

=== 1892 ===
1892 Manitoba general election
Party	Candidate	Votes	%	±%
Liberal	John James Bird	342	51.12%	–
Conservative	Nathaniel Francis Hagel	327	48.88%	-20.71%
Total		669	–	–
Eligible voters / Turnout		971	68.90%	–
Rejected		N/A	–	–
Source(s) Source:Manitoba. Chief Electoral Officer (1999). Statement of Votes for the 37th Provincial General Election, September 21, 1999 (PDF) (Report). Winnipeg: Elections Manitoba. pp. 211–277.

=== 1896 ===
1896 Manitoba general election
Party	Candidate	Votes	%	±%
Conservative	Hector Sutherland	406	51.85%	2.97%
Liberal	John James Bird	377	48.15%	-2.97%
Total		783	–	–
Eligible voters / Turnout		1,040	75.29%	6.39%
Rejected		N/A	–	–
Source(s) Source:Manitoba. Chief Electoral Officer (1999). Statement of Votes for the 37th Provincial General Election, September 21, 1999 (PDF) (Report). Winnipeg: Elections Manitoba. pp. 211–277.

=== 1899 ===
1899 Manitoba general election
Party	Candidate	Votes	%	±%
Conservative	Orton Grain	830	60.01%	8.16%
Liberal	D. F. Reid	553	39.99%	-8.16%
Total		1,383	–	–
Eligible voters / Turnout		N/A	–	–
Rejected		N/A	–	–
Source(s) Source:Manitoba. Chief Electoral Officer (1999). Statement of Votes for the 37th Provincial General Election, September 21, 1999 (PDF) (Report). Winnipeg: Elections Manitoba. pp. 211–277.

=== 1903 ===
1903 Manitoba general election
Party	Candidate	Votes	%	±%
Liberal	Martin O'Donohoe	718	50.17%	10.19%
Conservative	Orton Grain	713	49.83%	-10.19%
Total		1,431	–	–
Eligible voters / Turnout		N/A	–	–
Rejected		N/A	–	–
Source(s) Source:Manitoba. Chief Electoral Officer (1999). Statement of Votes for the 37th Provincial General Election, September 21, 1999 (PDF) (Report). Winnipeg: Elections Manitoba. pp. 211–277.

=== 1907 ===
1907 Manitoba general election
Party	Candidate	Votes	%	±%
Conservative	Orton Grain	792	51.33%	1.50%
Liberal	Martin O'Donohoe	751	48.67%	-1.50%
Total		1,543	–	–
Eligible voters / Turnout		N/A	–	–
Rejected		N/A	–	–
Source(s) Source:Manitoba. Chief Electoral Officer (1999). Statement of Votes for the 37th Provincial General Election, September 21, 1999 (PDF) (Report). Winnipeg: Elections Manitoba. pp. 211–277.

=== 1910 ===
1910 Manitoba general election
Party	Candidate	Votes	%	±%
Conservative	Orton Grain	1,131	52.02%	0.70%
Liberal	Albert Ryerson Bredin	1,043	47.98%	-0.70%
Total		2,174	–	–
Eligible voters / Turnout		N/A	–	–
Rejected		N/A	–	–
Source(s) Source:Manitoba. Chief Electoral Officer (1999). Statement of Votes for the 37th Provincial General Election, September 21, 1999 (PDF) (Report). Winnipeg: Elections Manitoba. pp. 211–277.

=== 1913 by-election ===
Manitoba provincial by-election, 1913
Party	Candidate	Votes	%	±%
Conservative	Walter Humphries Montague	1,319	59.41%	7.39%
Liberal	Albert Ryerson Bredin	901	40.59%	-7.39%
Total		2,220	–	–
Eligible voters / Turnout		N/A	–	–
Rejected		N/A	–	–
Source(s) Source:Manitoba. Chief Electoral Officer (1999). Statement of Votes for the 37th Provincial General Election, September 21, 1999 (PDF) (Report). Winnipeg: Elections Manitoba. pp. 211–277.

=== 1914 ===
1914 Manitoba general election
Party	Candidate	Votes	%	±%
Conservative	Walter Humphries Montague	1,086	50.07%	-9.35%
Liberal	George Prout	1,083	49.93%	9.35%
Total		2,169	–	–
Eligible voters / Turnout		N/A	–	–
Rejected		N/A	–	–
Source(s) Source:Manitoba. Chief Electoral Officer (1999). Statement of Votes for the 37th Provincial General Election, September 21, 1999 (PDF) (Report). Winnipeg: Elections Manitoba. pp. 211–277.

=== 1915 ===
1915 Manitoba general election
Party	Candidate	Votes	%	±%
Liberal	George Prout	1,295	63.20%	13.27%
Conservative	Richard Sanders	754	36.80%	-13.27%
Total		2,049	–	–
Eligible voters / Turnout		N/A	–	–
Rejected		N/A	–	–
Source(s) Source:Manitoba. Chief Electoral Officer (1999). Statement of Votes for the 37th Provincial General Election, September 21, 1999 (PDF) (Report). Winnipeg: Elections Manitoba. pp. 211–277.

=== 1920 ===
1920 Manitoba general election
Party	Candidate	Votes	%	±%
Labour	Charles Albert Tanner	1,184	40.66%	–
Liberal	David Morrison	876	30.08%	-33.12%
Farmer	T. McConnell	852	29.26%	–
Total		2,912	–	–
Eligible voters / Turnout		N/A	–	–
Rejected		N/A	–	–
Source(s) Source:Manitoba. Chief Electoral Officer (1999). Statement of Votes for the 37th Provincial General Election, September 21, 1999 (PDF) (Report). Winnipeg: Elections Manitoba. pp. 211–277.

=== 1922 ===
1922 Manitoba general election
Party	Candidate	Votes	%	±%
Labour	Charles Albert Tanner	1,453	44.60%	3.94%
Liberal	Fred Larter	977	29.99%	-0.09%
United Farmers	Samuel Henry Summerscales	828	25.41%	–
Total		3,258	–	–
Eligible voters / Turnout		N/A	–	–
Rejected		N/A	–	–
Source(s) Source:Manitoba. Chief Electoral Officer (1999). Statement of Votes for the 37th Provincial General Election, September 21, 1999 (PDF) (Report). Winnipeg: Elections Manitoba. pp. 211–277.

=== 1927 ===
1927 Manitoba general election
Party	Candidate	Votes	%	±%
Conservative	James McLenaghen	1,530	37.14%	–
Liberal	Walter Henry Gabriel "Harry" Gibbs	1,456	35.34%	5.35%
Progressive	Charles Albert Tanner	1,134	27.52%	–
Total		4,120	–	–
Eligible voters / Turnout		N/A	–	–
Rejected		N/A	–	–
Source(s) Source:Manitoba. Chief Electoral Officer (1999). Statement of Votes for the 37th Provincial General Election, September 21, 1999 (PDF) (Report). Winnipeg: Elections Manitoba. pp. 211–277.

=== 1932 ===
1932 Manitoba general election
Party	Candidate	Votes	%	±%
Conservative	James McLenaghen	2,664	40.35%	3.22%
Liberal–Progressive	Walter Henry Gabriel "Harry" Gibbs	2,625	39.76%	–
Labour	Charles H. Cook	1,313	19.89%	–
Total		6,602	–	–
Eligible voters / Turnout		N/A	–	–
Rejected		N/A	–	–
Source(s) Source:Manitoba. Chief Electoral Officer (1999). Statement of Votes for the 37th Provincial General Election, September 21, 1999 (PDF) (Report). Winnipeg: Elections Manitoba. pp. 211–277.

=== 1936 ===
1936 Manitoba general election
Party	Candidate	Votes	%	±%
Conservative	James McLenaghen	2,870	41.49%	1.14%
Liberal–Progressive	Charles Elwyn Fillmore	2,271	32.83%	-6.93%
Independent Labour	R. A. Wise	1,776	25.68%	–
Total		6,917	–	–
Eligible voters / Turnout		N/A	–	–
Rejected		N/A	–	–
Source(s) Source:Manitoba. Chief Electoral Officer (1999). Statement of Votes for the 37th Provincial General Election, September 21, 1999 (PDF) (Report). Winnipeg: Elections Manitoba. pp. 211–277.

=== 1941 ===
1941 Manitoba general election
Party	Candidate	Votes	%	±%
Conservative	James McLenaghen	3,447	64.12%	22.63%
Co-operative Commonwealth	Cornelius Byle	1,929	35.88%	–
Total		5,376	–	–
Eligible voters / Turnout		N/A	–	–
Rejected		N/A	–	–
Source(s) Source:Manitoba. Chief Electoral Officer (1999). Statement of Votes for the 37th Provincial General Election, September 21, 1999 (PDF) (Report). Winnipeg: Elections Manitoba. pp. 211–277.

=== 1945 ===
1945 Manitoba general election
Party	Candidate	Votes	%	±%
Progressive Conservative	James McLenaghen	3,518	56.23%	–
Co-operative Commonwealth	William Grundy	2,313	36.97%	1.08%
Labor–Progressive	William Gilbey	426	6.81%	–
Total		6,257	–	–
Eligible voters / Turnout		N/A	–	–
Rejected		N/A	–	–
Source(s) Source:Manitoba. Chief Electoral Officer (1999). Statement of Votes for the 37th Provincial General Election, September 21, 1999 (PDF) (Report). Winnipeg: Elections Manitoba. pp. 211–277.

=== 1949 ===
1949 Manitoba general election
Party	Candidate	Votes	%	±%
Co-operative Commonwealth	George Olive	2,177	50.48%	13.51%
Liberal–Progressive	Melvin Justus Given McMullen "Len Vintus"	2,136	49.52%	–
Total		4,313	–	–
Eligible voters / Turnout		N/A	–	–
Rejected		N/A	–	–
Source(s) Source: Manitoba. Chief Electoral Officer (1999). Statement of Votes for the 37th Provincial General Election, September 21, 1999 (PDF) (Report). Winnipeg: Elections Manitoba. pp. 211–277.

=== 1953 ===
1953 Manitoba general election
Party	Candidate	Votes	%	±%
Co-operative Commonwealth	Russell Paulley	6,052	47.85%	-2.62%
Liberal–Progressive	John Leslie Bodie	4,566	36.10%	-13.42%
Social Credit	Lorne G. Carson	1,209	9.56%	–
Independent	Steve Melnyk	820	6.48%	–
Total		12,647	–	–
Eligible voters / Turnout		N/A	–	–
Rejected		N/A	–	–
Source(s) Source: Manitoba. Chief Electoral Officer (1999). Statement of Votes for the 37th Provincial General Election, September 21, 1999 (PDF) (Report). Winnipeg: Elections Manitoba. pp. 211–277.

=== 1958 ===
1958 Manitoba general election
Party	Candidate	Votes	%	±%
Co-operative Commonwealth	A. J. Reid	2,776	38.29%	-9.56%
Progressive Conservative	John Ernest "Jack" Willis	2,665	36.76%	–
Liberal–Progressive	George Nordland Suttie	1,808	24.94%	-11.16%
Total		7,249	–	–
Eligible voters / Turnout		12,239	59.23%	–
Rejected		35	–	–
Source(s) Source: Manitoba. Chief Electoral Officer (1999). Statement of Votes for the 37th Provincial General Election, September 21, 1999 (PDF) (Report). Winnipeg: Elections Manitoba. pp. 211–277.

=== 1959 ===
1959 Manitoba general election
Party	Candidate	Votes	%	±%
Co-operative Commonwealth	A. J. Reid	3,659	40.02%	1.73%
Progressive Conservative	John Ernest "Jack" Willis	3,511	38.41%	1.64%
Liberal–Progressive	Cornelius Huebert	1,972	21.57%	-3.37%
Total		9,142	–	–
Eligible voters / Turnout		13,470	67.87%	8.64%
Rejected		20	–	–
Source(s) Source:Manitoba. Chief Electoral Officer (1999). Statement of Votes for the 37th Provincial General Election, September 21, 1999 (PDF) (Report). Winnipeg: Elections Manitoba. pp. 211–277.

=== 1962 ===
1962 Manitoba general election
Party	Candidate	Votes	%	±%
Progressive Conservative	James Mills	3,176	33.25%	-5.15%
New Democratic	A. J. Reid	3,172	33.21%	–
Liberal	Ernest Rudolph	2,751	28.80%	–
Social Credit	John De Fehr	452	4.73%	–
Total		9,551	–	–
Eligible voters / Turnout		17,183	55.58%	-12.29%
Rejected		94	–	–
Source(s) Source:Manitoba. Chief Electoral Officer (1999). Statement of Votes for the 37th Provincial General Election, September 21, 1999 (PDF) (Report). Winnipeg: Elections Manitoba. pp. 211–277.

=== 1966 ===
1966 Manitoba general election
Party	Candidate	Votes	%	±%
New Democratic	Peter Fox	4,644	36.43%	3.22%
Progressive Conservative	James Mills	3,808	29.87%	-3.38%
Liberal	James Smith	2,966	23.26%	-5.54%
Social Credit	Henry W. Redekopp	1,331	10.44%	5.71%
Total		12,749	–	–
Eligible voters / Turnout		19,335	65.94%	10.35%
Rejected		47	–	–
Source(s) Source:Manitoba. Chief Electoral Officer (1999). Statement of Votes for the 37th Provincial General Election, September 21, 1999 (PDF) (Report). Winnipeg: Elections Manitoba. pp. 211–277.

=== 1969 ===
1969 Manitoba general election
Party	Candidate	Votes	%	±%
New Democratic	Peter Fox	4,589	62.73%	26.30%
Progressive Conservative	Don Mills	1,876	25.64%	-4.23%
Liberal	John Gugulyn	851	11.63%	-11.63%
Total		7,316	–	–
Eligible voters / Turnout		10,616	68.91%	2.98%
Rejected		22	–	–
Source(s) Source:Manitoba. Chief Electoral Officer (1999). Statement of Votes for the 37th Provincial General Election, September 21, 1999 (PDF) (Report). Winnipeg: Elections Manitoba. pp. 211–277.

=== 1973 ===
1973 Manitoba general election
Party	Candidate	Votes	%	±%
New Democratic	Peter Fox	5,718	54.59%	-8.14%
Progressive Conservative	Don Lynn Heidman	2,660	25.39%	-0.25%
Liberal	Ann McTavish	2,097	20.02%	8.39%
Total		10,475	–	–
Eligible voters / Turnout		12,699	82.49%	13.57%
Rejected		58	–	–
Source(s) Source:Manitoba. Chief Electoral Officer (1999). Statement of Votes for the 37th Provincial General Election, September 21, 1999 (PDF) (Report). Winnipeg: Elections Manitoba. pp. 211–277.

=== 1977 ===
1977 Manitoba general election
Party	Candidate	Votes	%	±%
New Democratic	Peter Fox	5,568	49.95%	-4.64%
Progressive Conservative	James "Jim" Hanson	4,651	41.72%	16.33%
Liberal	Norm Stapon	929	8.33%	-11.69%
Total		11,148	–	–
Eligible voters / Turnout		14,390	77.47%	-5.02%
Rejected		36	–	–
Source(s) Source:Manitoba. Chief Electoral Officer (1999). Statement of Votes for the 37th Provincial General Election, September 21, 1999 (PDF) (Report). Winnipeg: Elections Manitoba. pp. 211–277.

=== 1981 ===
1981 Manitoba general election
Party	Candidate	Votes	%	±%
New Democratic	Mary Beth Dolin	6,794	55.11%	5.17%
Progressive Conservative	Ken Galanchuk	4,478	36.33%	-5.39%
Liberal	Alex Berkowits	755	6.12%	-2.21%
Progressive	Dan Tokarz	300	2.43%	–
Total		12,327	–	–
Eligible voters / Turnout		16,120	76.47%	-1.00%
Rejected		33	–	–
Source(s) Source:Manitoba. Chief Electoral Officer (1999). Statement of Votes for the 37th Provincial General Election, September 21, 1999 (PDF) (Report). Winnipeg: Elections Manitoba. pp. 211–277.

=== 1985 by-election ===
Manitoba provincial by-election, October 1, 1985 Death of Mary Beth Dolin
Party	Candidate	Votes	%	±%
New Democratic	Marty Dolin	4,332	47.53%	-7.58%
Progressive Conservative	Bev Rayburn	3,248	35.64%	-0.69%
Liberal	Chris Guly	988	10.84%	4.72%
Progressive	Ben Hanuschak	546	5.99%	3.56%
Total		9,114	–	–
Eligible voters / Turnout		N/A	–	–
Rejected		N/A	–	–
Source(s) Source:Manitoba. Chief Electoral Officer (1999). Statement of Votes for the 37th Provincial General Election, September 21, 1999 (PDF) (Report). Winnipeg: Elections Manitoba. pp. 211–277.

=== 1986 ===
1986 Manitoba general election
Party	Candidate	Votes	%	±%
New Democratic	Marty Dolin	6,199	51.65	4.12
Progressive Conservative	Bev Rayburn	4,210	35.08	-0.56
Liberal	Hy Berman	1,134	9.45	-1.39
Progressive	Ben Hanuschak	459	3.82	-2.17
Total valid votes		12,002	–	–
Rejected		30	–	
Eligible voters / Turnout		18,957	63.47	–
New Democratic hold		Swing		-1.10
Source(s) Source: Manitoba. Chief Electoral Officer (1999). Statement of Votes for the 37th Provincial General Election, September 21, 1999 (PDF) (Report). Winnipeg: Elections Manitoba.

=== 1988 ===
1988 Manitoba general election
Party	Candidate	Votes	%	±%
Liberal	Gulzar Singh Cheema	5,653	35.69	26.24
Progressive Conservative	John Baluta	5,068	31.99	-3.08
New Democratic	Marty Dolin	4,542	28.67	-22.98
Progressive	Sidney Green	445	2.81	-1.02
Western Independence	Tracy Fuhr	133	0.84	–
Total valid votes		15,841	–	–
Rejected		56	–	
Eligible voters / turnout		20,785	76.48	13.01
Liberal gain from New Democratic		Swing		+24.61
Source(s) Source: Manitoba. Chief Electoral Officer (1999). Statement of Votes for the 37th Provincial General Election, September 21, 1999 (PDF) (Report). Winnipeg: Elections Manitoba.

=== 1990 ===
1990 Manitoba general election
Party	Candidate	Votes	%	±%
New Democratic	Dave Chomiak	3,904	35.69%	7.02%
Progressive Conservative	David Langtry	3,694	33.77%	1.78%
Liberal	Claudia Sarbit	2,771	25.33%	-10.35%
Progressive	Sidney Green	570	5.21%	2.40%
Total		10,939	–	–
Eligible voters / Turnout		14,604	74.90%	-1.31%
Rejected		35	–	–
Source(s) Source:Manitoba. Chief Electoral Officer (1999). Statement of Votes for the 37th Provincial General Election, September 21, 1999 (PDF) (Report). Winnipeg: Elections Manitoba. pp. 211–277.

=== 1995 ===
1995 Manitoba general election
Party	Candidate	Votes	%	±%
New Democratic	Dave Chomiak	5,812	52.00	16.31
Progressive Conservative	Robert Praznik	3,324	29.74	-4.03
Liberal	Joe Gallagher	2,041	18.26	-7.07
Total valid votes		11,177	–	–
Rejected		45	–	
Eligible voters / Turnout		15,106	74.29	-0.86
Source(s) Source: Manitoba. Chief Electoral Officer (1999). Statement of Votes for the 37th Provincial General Election, September 21, 1999 (PDF) (Report). Winnipeg: Elections Manitoba.

=== 1999 ===
1999 Manitoba general election
Party	Candidate	Votes	%	±%	Expenditures
New Democratic	Dave Chomiak	6,101	62.66	10.66	$16,574.00
Progressive Conservative	Shannon Martin	2,542	26.11	-3.63	$14,834.13
Liberal	Michael Lazar	1,093	11.23	-7.03	$7,835.59
Total valid votes		9,736	–	–	
Rejected		54	–		
Eligible voters / turnout		13,818	70.85	-3.44	
Source(s) Source: Manitoba. Chief Electoral Officer (1999). Statement of Votes for the 37th Provincial General Election, September 21, 1999 (PDF) (Report). Winnipeg: Elections Manitoba.

=== 2003 ===
2003 Manitoba general election
Party	Candidate	Votes	%	±%	Expenditures
New Democratic	Dave Chomiak	5,123	70.13	7.47	$13,829.93
Progressive Conservative	Garreth McDonald	1,100	15.06	-11.05	$687.20
Liberal	Michael Lazar	942	12.90	1.67	$4,417.81
Green	Frank Luschak	140	1.92	–	$106.76
Total valid votes		7,305	–	–	
Rejected		46	–		
Eligible voters / turnout		13,788	53.31	-17.54	
Source(s) Source: Manitoba. Chief Electoral Officer (2003). Statement of Votes for the 38th Provincial General Election, June 3, 2003 (PDF) (Report). Winnipeg: Elections Manitoba.

=== 2007 ===
2007 Manitoba general election
Party	Candidate	Votes	%	±%	Expenditures
New Democratic	Dave Chomiak	5,012	61.63	-8.50	$18,009.09
Progressive Conservative	Brent Olynyk	2,360	29.02	13.96	$25,656.74
Liberal	Wade Parke	556	6.84	-6.06	$2,234.11
Green	Nathan Zahn	204	2.51	0.59	$0.00
Total valid votes		8,132	–	–	
Rejected		37	–		
Eligible voters / turnout		13,947	58.57	5.26	
Source(s) Source: Manitoba. Chief Electoral Officer (2007). Statement of Votes for the 39th Provincial General Election, May 22, 2007 (PDF) (Report). Winnipeg: Elections Manitoba.

=== 2011 ===
2011 Manitoba general election
Party	Candidate	Votes	%	±%	Expenditures
New Democratic	Dave Chomiak	4,808	59.51	-2.12	$27,083.52
Progressive Conservative	Darrell Penner	2,880	35.65	6.63	$29,346.96
Liberal	Dimitrius Sagriotis	391	4.84	-2.00	$467.60
Total valid votes		8,079	–	–	
Rejected		43	–		
Eligible voters / turnout		14,775	54.97	-3.60	
Source(s) Source: Manitoba. Chief Electoral Officer (2011). Statement of Votes for the 40th Provincial General Election, October 4, 2011 (PDF) (Report). Winnipeg: Elections Manitoba. "Election Returns: 40th General Election". Elections Manitoba. 2011.

=== 2016 ===
2016 Manitoba general election
Party	Candidate	Votes	%	±%	Expenditures
Progressive Conservative	Nic Curry	3,694	44.39	8.74	$37,848.07
New Democratic	Dave Chomiak	3,065	36.83	-22.68	$16,450.60
Liberal	Navdeep Khangura	974	11.70	6.86	$9,891.04
Green	Steven Stairs	456	5.48	–	$0.00
Manitoba	Gary Marshall	133	1.60	–	$1,129.52
Total valid votes/expense limit		8,322	–	–	$45,931.00
Rejected		83	–		
Eligible voters / turnout		13,787	60.96	5.99	
Source(s) Source: Manitoba. Chief Electoral Officer (2016). Statement of Votes for the 41st Provincial General Election, April 19, 2016 (PDF) (Report). Winnipeg: Elections Manitoba. "Election Returns: 41st General Election". Elections Manitoba. 2016.

== See also ==
- List of Manitoba provincial electoral districts
- Canadian provincial electoral districts
