= Hector Sutherland =

Hector Sutherland can refer to:

- Hector Sutherland (cyclist) (1930-2011), Australian cyclist
- Hector Sutherland (politician) (1852-1927), Canadian politician
- Hector Sutherland (skier) (1927-2012), Canadian skier
