= Hector Sutherland (politician) =

Canadian politician

Hector Sutherland (1852 – April 8, 1927) was a farmer and political figure in Manitoba. He represented Kildonan from 1896 to 1899 in the Legislative Assembly of Manitoba as a Conservative.

== Background ==
Sutherland was born in Rupert's Land, the son of John Sutherland, and was educated there and at Manitoba College. Sutherland served in the Winnipeg Light Infantry during the North-West Rebellion. In 1889, he married Henrietta Gunn. Sutherland served on the council for Kildonan and was a director of the Kildonan Agricultural Society.

He died at home in Summerland, British Columbia.
