= John MacBeth =

John MacBeth or John McBeth may refer to:

- John McBeth (born 1944), New Zealand journalist and author
- John MacBeth (Manitoba politician) (1854–1897), politician in Manitoba, Canada
- John Palmer MacBeth (1921–1991), politician in Ontario, Canada
