= Laurie Evans (politician) =

Canadian politician

Councillor in the Rural Municipality of Ste. Anne for Ward 6
- In office 2002–2015

Member of the Legislative Assembly of Manitoba for Fort Gary
- In office April 26, 1988 – September 11, 1990
- Preceded by: Charlie Birt
- Succeeded by: Rosemary Vodrey

Personal details
- Born: October 14, 1933 Unity, Saskatchewan, Canada
- Died: July 19, 2016 (aged 82)
- Party: Liberal
- Spouse: Mary Ellen Evans
- Education: University of Saskatchewan (B.Sc.) University of Manitoba
- Occupation: Agriculturalist, politician

Laurie Edward Evans (October 14, 1933 – June 19, 2016) was a politician in Manitoba, Canada. Between 1988 and 1990, he served as a member of the Legislative Assembly of Manitoba, representing the riding of Fort Garry for the Manitoba Liberal Party.

Born in Unity, Saskatchewan, Evans had a Bachelor of Science degree from the University of Saskatchewan, and Master of Science and PhD degrees from the University of Manitoba. He worked as an agriculturalist before entering public life, and joined the Academic Staff of the University of Manitoba in 1958. From 1968 to 1969, he was a technical advisor to the Canadian International Development Agency (CIDA) in Kenya. He was married to Mary Ellen Evans. He had three daughters from a previous marriage, Laura, Norma and Nancy, and two stepsons Joseph and John.

== Political career ==
Evans first ran for the provincial legislature in the provincial election of 1986, in the rural riding of Springfield (located just outside Winnipeg). He received 1,376 votes, finishing well behind incumbent New Democrat Andy Anstett and the winner, Progressive Conservative Gilles Roch.

Two years later, he was elected in the south-central Winnipeg riding of Fort Garry (which included the University of Manitoba's main campus at the time), defeating incumbent Progressive Conservative Charlie Birt by almost 1,000 votes. The Liberals increased their parliamentary representation from one to twenty in this election, and Evans sat with the official opposition for the next two years. In the provincial election of 1990, he lost to Progressive Conservative Rosemary Vodrey amid a general loss of support for the Liberal Party.

In 2002 Evans was elected Councillor for Ward 6 in the Rural Municipality of Ste. Anne, Manitoba, serving in this position until he resigned in 2015 to move back to Winnipeg.

== Election results ==
1986 Manitoba general election: Springfield
Party	Candidate	Votes	%	±%
Progressive Conservative	Gilles Roch	5,094	44.26	-1.44
New Democratic	Andy Anstett	5,039	43.78	-6.36
Liberal	Laurie Evans	1,376	11.96	8.86
Total valid votes		11,509	–	–
Rejected		28	–	
Eligible voters / Turnout		15,732	73.33	-3.03
Progressive Conservative gain from New Democratic		Swing		+2.46
Source(s) Source: Manitoba. Chief Electoral Officer (1999). Statement of Votes for the 37th Provincial General Election, September 21, 1999 (PDF) (Report). Winnipeg: Elections Manitoba.

1988 Manitoba general election: Fort Garry
Party	Candidate	Votes	%	±%
Liberal	Laurie Evans	6,055	46.58	26.68
Progressive Conservative	Charlies Birt	5,173	39.80	-8.65
New Democratic	Brian Pannell	1,553	11.95	-17.78
Western Independence	Ivan Merritt	173	1.33	-0.60
Communist	Millie Lamb	45	0.35	–
Total valid votes		12,999	–	–
Rejected		12	–	
Eligible voters / turnout		16,634	78.22	11.99
Liberal gain from Progressive Conservative		Swing		+17.67
Source(s) Source: Manitoba. Chief Electoral Officer (1999). Statement of Votes for the 37th Provincial General Election, September 21, 1999 (PDF) (Report). Winnipeg: Elections Manitoba.

1990 Manitoba general election: Fort Garry
Party	Candidate	Votes	%	±%
Progressive Conservative	Rosemary Vodrey	5,105	47.07	7.27
Liberal	Laurie Evans	3,992	36.81	-9.77
New Democratic	Shirley Lord	1,500	13.83	1.88
Western Independence	Jan Mandseth	249	2.30	0.96
Total valid votes		10,846	–	–
Rejected		17	–	
Eligible voters / turnout		14,890	72.96	-5.26
Progressive Conservative gain from Liberal		Swing		+8.52
Source(s) Source: Manitoba. Chief Electoral Officer (1999). Statement of Votes for the 37th Provincial General Election, September 21, 1999 (PDF) (Report). Winnipeg: Elections Manitoba.
