= Alexander Sutherland (politician) =

Canadian politician

Alexander MacBeth Sutherland (December 31, 1849 – March 7, 1884) was a Canadian lawyer and political figure in Manitoba. He represented Kildonan from 1879 to 1884 in the Legislative Assembly of Manitoba as a Liberal-Conservative.

Sutherland was born in Point Douglas, Manitoba, the son of John Sutherland and Janet MacBeth, and was educated in Kildonan, at St. John's College, at Manitoba College, and at the University of Toronto. Sutherland served in the provincial cabinet as Attorney General and as Provincial Secretary.

Sutherland died of typhoid fever at the age of 34.
