= Orton Grain =

Canadian physician and politician

Orton Irwin Grain
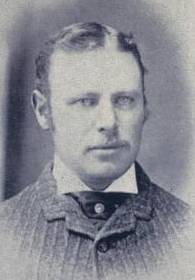

Member of the Legislative Assembly of Manitoba for Kildonan and St. Andrews
- In office 1900–1903, 1907–1913

Personal details
- Born: August 9, 1863 Fergus, Canada West
- Died: February 2, 1930 (aged 66) Winnipeg, Manitoba

Orton Irwin Grain (August 9, 1863 – February 2, 1930) was a Canadian physician and politician in Manitoba. He served in the Legislative Assembly of Manitoba from 1899 to 1903, and again from 1907 to 1913.

Grain was born in Fergus, Canada West, the son of William Grain, a native of Gibraltar, and Mary Orton, the sister of Dr. G. T. Orton, and attended schools in Fergus and the Toronto School of Medicine. He was assistant surgeon of the 91st battalion in Canada. Grain was one of the charter holders of the Winnipeg and Northern Railway, and served as mayor of Selkirk in 1896. In religion, he was a member of the Church of England. He practised medicine in Banff, Alberta, Manitou, Manitoba, Winnipeg and Selkirk. In 1890, Grain married Annie Cull.

He was first elected to the Manitoba legislature in the 1899 provincial election, winning the constituency of Kildonan and St. Andrews as a Liberal-Conservative. He supported the Conservative administration of Hugh John Macdonald and Rodmond Roblin, and sat as a government backbencher in the legislature which followed. Running as a Conservative, he lost to Liberal candidate M.J. O'Donohue by five votes in the 1903 election.

Grain defeated O'Donahue by 41 votes in the 1907 election, and again served as a backbench supporter of Roblin's government. He was re-elected in the 1910 election, and resigned from the legislature in 1913.

In late 1913, he was named medical inspector for the western provinces for the Canadian Department of Indian Affairs, charged with dealing with the problem of tuberculosis on first nations reserves and, at the same time, with reducing expenses incurred by the department. Grain made a number of suggestions for treating tuberculosis on reserves, but these were rejected for economic reasons. His position in the department was abolished in 1918.

In 1914, Grain moved to Winnipeg. He died at home there in 1930.
