= James McLenaghen =

Canadian politician (1891–1950)

Member of the Manitoba Legislative Assembly for Kildonan and St. Andrews
- In office 1927–1950
- Preceded by: Charles Albert Tanner
- Succeeded by: George Olive

Personal details
- Born: September 4, 1891 Balderson, Ontario, Canada
- Died: June 23, 1950 (aged 58) St. Andrews, Manitoba, Canada
- Party: Progressive Conservative Party of Manitoba
- Education: University of Manitoba
- Profession: lawyer

James O. McLenaghen (September 4, 1891 – June 23, 1950) was a politician in Manitoba, Canada. He served in the Legislative Assembly of Manitoba from 1927 until his death, and was a cabinet minister in the governments of John Bracken, Stuart Garson and Douglas Campbell.

The son of John McLenaghen and Elisabeth McIlquhan, McLenaghen was born in Balderson, Ontario in 1891, where he was educated until 1902; afterwards he went to school in Portage la Prairie, Manitoba. He later attained a Bachelor of Arts degree from Manitoba University, and worked as a barrister-of-law, after studying in the office of future Prime Minister Arthur Meighen. McLenaghen was called to the Manitoba bar in 1918. In 1919, he married Catherine Newman.

McLenaghen became active in the Conservative Party of Manitoba, and sought election to the provincial legislature for Kildonan and St. Andrews in the 1927 provincial election. He was successful, defeating Liberal W.H. Gibbs and a candidate aligned with the governing Progressive Party. He was re-elected in the 1932 election, defeating Gibbs (now a candidate of the merged "Liberal-Progressive" alliance) by 39 votes.

McLenaghen was returned by an increased majority in the 1936 provincial election, the first in which the Conservative Party was led by Errick Willis. Four years later, he helped to bring the Conservative Party into a governing alliance with the Liberal-Progressives, along with the smaller Cooperative Commonwealth Federation and Social Credit parties. All parties were given cabinet representation, and McLenaghen was appointed as Minister of Health and Public Welfare on November 4, 1942. The coalition's leader was Premier John Bracken, leader of the Liberal-Progressive Party.

On May 3, 1941, McLenaghen was appointed as the province's Attorney General. He left the Health portfolio on February 11, 1944, but continued to serve as Attorney General of Manitoba until his death. On December 14, 1948, he was also given the title Minister under the Trade Practices Enquiry Act. He also served as Minister of Labour from February 5, 1944, until February 14, 1946.

After joining the coalition government, McLenaghen did not face electoral competition from Liberal-Progressive candidates. He was re-elected in 1941, 1945 Manitoba general election and 1949 over candidates of the CCF, though in 1945 he almost lost the coalition nomination to Frank Simmonds.

McLenaghen was known as a likeable figure, though essentially conservative on policy matters. Like other Attorneys-General in the coalition government, he refused to devote crown resources to prison reform during the 1940s. He was also an influential figure in the Conservative Party, and frequently defended the coalition against other Tories who saw it as detrimental to party interests. His death in 1950 deprived the pro-coalition forces in the party of their most powerful voice, and the Conservatives in fact left the coalition soon after.
