= John MacBeth (Manitoba politician) =

Canadian politician

John MacBeth (March 27, 1854 – September 27, 1897) was a Canadian lawyer and political figure based in Manitoba. He represented Kildonan and St. Paul from 1884 to 1888 in the Legislative Assembly of Manitoba as a Conservative. His surname also appears as McBeth.

He was born in Kildonan, Manitoba, the son of Robert McBeath, and was educated there, at St. John's College and at the Manitoba College. MacBeth studied law and was called to the Manitoba bar in 1882. He served as clerk of the Executive Council from 1883 to 1884. MacBeth was elected to the provincial assembly in an 1884 by-election held following the death of Alexander Sutherland. In 1889, he married Charlotte Smith. He was president of the Historical and Scientific Society from 1891 to 1893.

MacBeth died in Denver, Colorado at the age of 43 and was buried in Port Hope, Ontario.
