= Springfield (provincial electoral district) =

Defunct provincial electoral district in Manitoba, Canada

Coordinates: 49.968°N 96.778°W

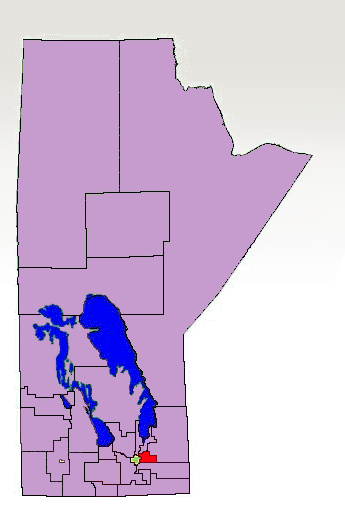
The last boundaries for Springfield from 1998–2011 highlighted in red

Springfield was a provincial electoral district of Manitoba, Canada. It was created by the province's first electoral redistribution in 1874 and existed until 2011, except for the period from 1914 to 1920.

Springfield was located to the immediate east of the city of Winnipeg. It was bordered to the north by Selkirk and Gimli, to the east by Lac Du Bonnet, and to the south by La Verendrye. The riding included the municipalities of Springfield and East St. Paul, as well as Anola, Dugald, Birds Hill, and Oakbank. Before 1989, the riding stretched as far as the Ontario border.

In 1914, the riding was abolished into St. Clements and Elmwood. In 1920, it was recreated out of Elmwood.

The riding's population in 1996 was 18,599. In 1999, the average family income was $67,794, and the unemployment rate was 4.50%. Manufacturing accounted for 12% of all industry in the riding, followed by 11% in the service sector. Springfield had significant Ukrainian and German populations, at 9% and 8% respectively.

Springfield was represented by various political parties over its long history, without any one party dominating for an extended period of time. This pattern had begun to change, as the riding had been represented by the Progressive Conservatives since 1990, and the last member, Member of the Legislative Assembly, Ron Schuler, was re-elected with over 60% of the vote in 2003. The seat was considered safe for the Progressive Conservatives.

Following the 2008 electoral redistribution, the riding was dissolved into La Verendrye and the new riding of St. Paul. This took effect for the 2011 election.

== Members of the Legislative Assembly ==
Name	Party	Took office	Left office
William Dick	Opposition	1874	1878
Arthur Ross	Opposition/Liberal	1878	1879
	Government/Liberal	1879	1882
Charles Edie	Conservative	1882	1883
John Bell	Independent Liberal	1883	1886
Thomas Smith	Liberal-Conservative	1886	1888(?)
	Independent	1888(?)	1889(?)
	Liberal	1889(?)	1903
W.H. Corbett	Conservative	1903	1907
Donald Ross	Liberal	1907	1914
Arthur Moore	Dominion Labour	1920	1920
	Independent Labour Party	1920	1922
Clifford Barclay	Progressive	1922	1927
Murdoch Mackay	Liberal	1927	1932
Clifford Barclay	Independent Farmer-Labour	1932	1936
Evelyn Shannon	Liberal-Progressive	1936	1945
George Olive	Co-operative Commonwealth	1945	1949
William Lucko	Liberal-Progressive	1949	1959
Fred Klym	Progressive Conservative	1959	1969
Rene Toupin	New Democrat	1969	1977
Bob Anderson	Progressive Conservative	1977	1981
Andy Anstett	New Democrat	1981	1986
Gilles Roch	Progressive Conservative	1986	1988
Gilles Roch	Liberal	1988	1990
Glen Findlay	Progressive Conservative	1990	1999
Ron Schuler	Progressive Conservative	1999	2011

== Electoral results ==
=== 1874 ===
1874 Manitoba general election
Party	Candidate	Votes	%
Undeclared	William Dick	84	62.69
Undeclared	John Scott	50	37.31
Total valid votes		134	–
Rejected		N/A	–
Eligible voters / Turnout		233	57.51
Source(s) Source: Manitoba. Chief Electoral Officer (1999). Statement of Votes for the 37th Provincial General Election, September 21, 1999 (PDF) (Report). Winnipeg: Elections Manitoba.

=== 1878 ===
1878 Manitoba general election
Party	Candidate	Votes	%	±%
Undeclared	Arthur Wellington Ross	117	45.35	-54.65
Undeclared	A. D. Irish	110	42.64	-57.36
Undeclared	A. Bray	31	12.02	-87.98
Total valid votes		258	–	–
Rejected		N/A	–	
Eligible voters / Turnout		274	94.16	36.65
Source(s) Source: Manitoba. Chief Electoral Officer (1999). Statement of Votes for the 37th Provincial General Election, September 21, 1999 (PDF) (Report). Winnipeg: Elections Manitoba.

=== 1879 ===
1879 Manitoba general election
Party	Candidate	Votes	%	±%
Liberal	Arthur Wellington Ross	222	98.67	–
Undeclared	A. Barnard	3	1.33	-98.67
Total valid votes		225	–	–
Rejected		N/A	–	
Eligible voters / Turnout		N/A	–	–
Source(s) Source: Manitoba. Chief Electoral Officer (1999). Statement of Votes for the 37th Provincial General Election, September 21, 1999 (PDF) (Report). Winnipeg: Elections Manitoba.

=== 1882 by-election ===
Manitoba provincial by-election, 1882 Resignation of Arthur Wellington Ross
Party	Candidate	Votes	%	±%
Conservative	Charles Bruce Edie	179	60.47	–
Unknown	John Matheson	117	39.53	–
Total valid votes		296	–	–
Rejected		N/A	–	
Eligible voters / Turnout		N/A	–	–
Source(s) Source: Manitoba. Chief Electoral Officer (1999). Statement of Votes for the 37th Provincial General Election, September 21, 1999 (PDF) (Report). Winnipeg: Elections Manitoba.

=== 1883 ===
1883 Manitoba general election
Party	Candidate	Votes	%	±%
Liberal	John Hedley Bell	169	51.06	–
Conservative	Charles Bruce Edie	162	48.94	-11.53
Total valid votes		331	–	–
Rejected		N/A	–	
Eligible voters / Turnout		N/A	–	–
Source(s) Source: Manitoba. Chief Electoral Officer (1999). Statement of Votes for the 37th Provincial General Election, September 21, 1999 (PDF) (Report). Winnipeg: Elections Manitoba.

=== 1886 ===
1886 Manitoba general election
Party	Candidate	Votes	%	±%
Conservative	Thomas Henry Smith	204	51.13	2.19
Liberal	J. B. McArthur	195	48.87	-2.19
Total valid votes		399	–	–
Rejected		N/A	–	
Eligible voters / Turnout		652	61.20	–
Source(s) Source: Manitoba. Chief Electoral Officer (1999). Statement of Votes for the 37th Provincial General Election, September 21, 1999 (PDF) (Report). Winnipeg: Elections Manitoba.

=== 1888 ===
1888 Manitoba general election
Party	Candidate	Votes	%	±%
Independent	Thomas Henry Smith		0.00	–
Total valid votes			–	–
Rejected		N/A	–	
Eligible voters / Turnout		N/A	–	–
Source(s) Source: Manitoba. Chief Electoral Officer (1999). Statement of Votes for the 37th Provincial General Election, September 21, 1999 (PDF) (Report). Winnipeg: Elections Manitoba.

=== 1892 ===
1892 Manitoba general election
Party	Candidate	Votes	%	±%
Liberal	Thomas Henry Smith	298	64.92	–
Conservative	R. S. Conklin	161	35.08	–
Total valid votes		459	–	–
Rejected		N/A	–	
Eligible voters / Turnout		827	55.50	–
Source(s) Source: Manitoba. Chief Electoral Officer (1999). Statement of Votes for the 37th Provincial General Election, September 21, 1999 (PDF) (Report). Winnipeg: Elections Manitoba.

=== 1896 ===
1896 Manitoba general election
Party	Candidate	Votes	%	±%
Liberal	Thomas Henry Smith		0.00	-64.92
Total valid votes			–	–
Rejected		N/A	–	
Eligible voters / Turnout		852	0.00	-55.50
Source(s) Source: Manitoba. Chief Electoral Officer (1999). Statement of Votes for the 37th Provincial General Election, September 21, 1999 (PDF) (Report). Winnipeg: Elections Manitoba.

=== 1899 ===
1899 Manitoba general election
Party	Candidate	Votes	%	±%
Liberal	Thomas Henry Smith	406	52.12	–
Conservative	Elisha Frederick Hutchings	373	47.88	–
Total valid votes		779	–	–
Rejected		N/A	–	
Eligible voters / Turnout		1,266	61.53	61.53
Source(s) Source: Manitoba. Chief Electoral Officer (1999). Statement of Votes for the 37th Provincial General Election, September 21, 1999 (PDF) (Report). Winnipeg: Elections Manitoba.

=== 1903 ===
1903 Manitoba general election
Party	Candidate	Votes	%	±%
Conservative	William Henry Corbett	353	44.63	-3.25
Liberal	Thomas Henry Smith	245	30.97	-21.14
Independent	Donald A. Ross	193	24.40	–
Total valid votes		791	–	–
Rejected		N/A	–	
Eligible voters / Turnout		962	82.22	20.69
Source(s) Source: Manitoba. Chief Electoral Officer (1999). Statement of Votes for the 37th Provincial General Election, September 21, 1999 (PDF) (Report). Winnipeg: Elections Manitoba.

=== 1907 ===
1907 Manitoba general election
Party	Candidate	Votes	%	±%
Liberal	Donald A. Ross	540	60.07	29.09
Conservative	John Little	359	39.93	-4.69
Total valid votes		899	–	–
Rejected		N/A	–	
Eligible voters / Turnout		1,254	71.69	-10.53
Source(s) Source: Manitoba. Chief Electoral Officer (1999). Statement of Votes for the 37th Provincial General Election, September 21, 1999 (PDF) (Report). Winnipeg: Elections Manitoba.

=== 1910 ===
1910 Manitoba general election
Party	Candidate	Votes	%	±%
Liberal	Donald A. Ross	807	54.97	-5.09
Conservative	Charles Percy Fullerton	661	45.03	5.09
Total valid votes		1,468	–	–
Rejected		N/A	–	
Eligible voters / Turnout		1,943	75.55	3.86
Source(s) Source: Manitoba. Chief Electoral Officer (1999). Statement of Votes for the 37th Provincial General Election, September 21, 1999 (PDF) (Report). Winnipeg: Elections Manitoba.

=== 1920 ===
1920 Manitoba general election
Party	Candidate	Votes	%	±%
Labour	Arthur Moore	987	41.30	–
Farmer	Isaac Cook	928	38.83	–
Liberal	Edgar Douglas Richmond Bissett	352	14.73	-40.24
Farmer	E. R. Dugard	123	5.15	–
Total valid votes		2,390	–	–
Rejected		N/A	–	
Eligible voters / Turnout		3,869	61.77	-13.78
Source(s) Source: Manitoba. Chief Electoral Officer (1999). Statement of Votes for the 37th Provincial General Election, September 21, 1999 (PDF) (Report). Winnipeg: Elections Manitoba.

=== 1922 ===
1922 Manitoba general election
Party	Candidate	Votes	%	±%
United Farmers	Clifford Barclay	1,014	45.41	–
Liberal	William James Black	854	38.24	23.52
Conservative	Samuel Leonard Henry	365	16.35	–
Total valid votes		2,233	–	–
Rejected		N/A	–	
Eligible voters / Turnout		4,100	54.46	-7.31
Source(s) Source: Manitoba. Chief Electoral Officer (1999). Statement of Votes for the 37th Provincial General Election, September 21, 1999 (PDF) (Report). Winnipeg: Elections Manitoba.

=== 1927 ===
1927 Manitoba general election
Party	Candidate	Votes	%	±%
Liberal	Murdoch Mackay	1,507	43.22	4.97
Progressive	Clifford Barclay	1,489	42.70	–
Conservative	Theodore Stefanik	491	14.08	-2.26
Total valid votes		3,487	–	–
Rejected		N/A	–	
Eligible voters / Turnout		5,140	67.84	13.38
Source(s) Source: Manitoba. Chief Electoral Officer (1999). Statement of Votes for the 37th Provincial General Election, September 21, 1999 (PDF) (Report). Winnipeg: Elections Manitoba.

=== 1932 ===
1932 Manitoba general election
Party	Candidate	Votes	%	±%
Farmer–Labour	Clifford Barclay	3,192	43.56	–
Liberal–Progressive	Murdoch Mackay	2,540	34.66	–
Conservative	W. B. K. McRury	1,113	15.19	1.11
Labour	James Grant	251	3.43	–
Liberal	John A. Matheson	232	3.17	-40.05
Total valid votes		7,328	–	–
Rejected		N/A	–	
Eligible voters / Turnout		9,697	75.57	7.73
Source(s) Source: Manitoba. Chief Electoral Officer (1999). Statement of Votes for the 37th Provincial General Election, September 21, 1999 (PDF) (Report). Winnipeg: Elections Manitoba.

=== 1936 ===
1936 Manitoba general election
Party	Candidate	Votes	%	±%
Liberal–Progressive	Evelyn Shannon	2,637	42.03	7.37
Social Credit	L. J. Pulfer	2,261	36.04	–
Independent Labour	George Henry Barefoot	1,376	21.93	–
Total valid votes		6,274	–	–
Rejected		173	–	
Eligible voters / Turnout		10,843	59.46	-16.11
Source(s) Source: Manitoba. Chief Electoral Officer (1999). Statement of Votes for the 37th Provincial General Election, September 21, 1999 (PDF) (Report). Winnipeg: Elections Manitoba.

=== 1941 ===
1941 Manitoba general election
Party	Candidate	Votes	%	±%
Liberal–Progressive	Evelyn Shannon	2,061	35.23	-6.80
Social Credit	Alexander McLeod	1,786	30.53	-5.51
Independent	M. J. H. Hoban	1,044	17.85	–
Co-operative Commonwealth	Fred Small	959	16.39	–
Total valid votes		5,850	–	–
Rejected		167	–	
Eligible voters / Turnout		11,411	52.73	-6.73
Source(s) Source: Manitoba. Chief Electoral Officer (1999). Statement of Votes for the 37th Provincial General Election, September 21, 1999 (PDF) (Report). Winnipeg: Elections Manitoba.

=== 1945 ===
1945 Manitoba general election
Party	Candidate	Votes	%	±%
Co-operative Commonwealth	George Olive	3,106	44.53	28.14
Liberal–Progressive	Murdoch Mackay	1,992	28.56	-6.67
Independent Liberal	Michael John Hoban	1,393	19.97	–
Labor–Progressive	Joseph Ilchena	484	6.94	–
Total valid votes		6,975	–	–
Rejected		88	–	
Eligible voters / Turnout		12,150	58.13	5.40
Source(s) Source: Manitoba. Chief Electoral Officer (1999). Statement of Votes for the 37th Provincial General Election, September 21, 1999 (PDF) (Report). Winnipeg: Elections Manitoba.

=== 1949 ===
1949 Manitoba general election
Party	Candidate	Votes	%	±%
Liberal–Progressive	William Lucko	2,062	55.30	26.74
Independent	George A. Newton	860	23.06	–
Co-operative Commonwealth	Fred Small	807	21.64	-22.89
Total valid votes		3,729	–	–
Rejected		93	–	
Eligible voters / Turnout		8,013	47.70	-10.43
Source(s) Source: Manitoba. Chief Electoral Officer (1999). Statement of Votes for the 37th Provincial General Election, September 21, 1999 (PDF) (Report). Winnipeg: Elections Manitoba.

=== 1953 ===
1953 Manitoba general election
Party	Candidate	Votes	%	±%
Liberal–Progressive	William Lucko	1,965	46.90	-8.40
Social Credit	William Storsley	1,571	37.49	–
Progressive Conservative	Albert Hugh Watt	654	15.61	–
Total valid votes		4,190	–	–
Rejected		215	–	
Eligible voters / Turnout		7,855	56.08	8.38
Source(s) Source: Manitoba. Chief Electoral Officer (1999). Statement of Votes for the 37th Provincial General Election, September 21, 1999 (PDF) (Report). Winnipeg: Elections Manitoba.

=== 1958 ===
1958 Manitoba general election
Party	Candidate	Votes	%	±%
Liberal–Progressive	William Lucko	1,351	35.76	-11.14
Progressive Conservative	Oscar Russell	1,269	33.59	17.98
Co-operative Commonwealth	Ed Kanarowski	875	23.16	–
Social Credit	William G. Storsley	283	7.49	-30.00
Total valid votes		3,778	–	–
Rejected		14	–	
Eligible voters / Turnout		6,139	61.77	5.69
Source(s) Source: Manitoba. Chief Electoral Officer (1999). Statement of Votes for the 37th Provincial General Election, September 21, 1999 (PDF) (Report). Winnipeg: Elections Manitoba.

=== 1959 ===
1959 Manitoba general election
Party	Candidate	Votes	%	±%
Progressive Conservative	Fred Klym	1,878	45.18	11.59
Liberal–Progressive	William Lucko	1,507	36.25	0.49
Co-operative Commonwealth	Richard Loeb	772	18.57	-4.59
Total valid votes		4,157	–	–
Rejected		60	–	
Eligible voters / Turnout		6,143	68.65	6.88
Source(s) Source: Manitoba. Chief Electoral Officer (1999). Statement of Votes for the 37th Provincial General Election, September 21, 1999 (PDF) (Report). Winnipeg: Elections Manitoba.

=== 1962 ===
1962 Manitoba general election
Party	Candidate	Votes	%	±%
Progressive Conservative	Fred Klym	1,993	50.03	4.85
Liberal	William Lucko	1,562	39.21	2.96
Social Credit	Harold L. Patzer	429	10.77	–
Total valid votes		3,984	–	–
Rejected		15	–	
Eligible voters / Turnout		6,719	59.52	-9.13
Source(s) Source: Manitoba. Chief Electoral Officer (1999). Statement of Votes for the 37th Provincial General Election, September 21, 1999 (PDF) (Report). Winnipeg: Elections Manitoba.

=== 1966 ===
1966 Manitoba general election
Party	Candidate	Votes	%	±%
Progressive Conservative	Fred Klym	1,697	41.55	-8.47
New Democratic	Richard Loeb	1,274	31.19	–
Liberal	William Lucko	1,113	27.25	-11.95
Total valid votes		4,084	–	–
Rejected		27	–	
Eligible voters / Turnout		6,761	60.80	1.29
Source(s) Source: Manitoba. Chief Electoral Officer (1999). Statement of Votes for the 37th Provincial General Election, September 21, 1999 (PDF) (Report). Winnipeg: Elections Manitoba.

=== 1969 ===
1969 Manitoba general election
Party	Candidate	Votes	%	±%
New Democratic	Rene Toupin	2,724	53.60	22.41
Progressive Conservative	George Mulder	1,551	30.52	-11.03
Liberal	Hector Bahuaud	807	15.88	-11.37
Total valid votes		5,082	–	–
Rejected		14	–	
Eligible voters / Turnout		8,214	62.04	1.24
Source(s) Source: Manitoba. Chief Electoral Officer (1999). Statement of Votes for the 37th Provincial General Election, September 21, 1999 (PDF) (Report). Winnipeg: Elections Manitoba.

=== 1973 ===
1973 Manitoba general election
Party	Candidate	Votes	%	±%
New Democratic	Rene Toupin	3,611	45.81	-7.79
Progressive Conservative	John Vaags	3,245	41.16	10.65
Liberal	Len Mendes	694	8.80	-7.08
Independent	Harry Meronek	333	4.22	–
Total valid votes		7,883	–	–
Rejected		39	–	
Eligible voters / Turnout		9,825	80.63	18.59
Source(s) Source: Manitoba. Chief Electoral Officer (1999). Statement of Votes for the 37th Provincial General Election, September 21, 1999 (PDF) (Report). Winnipeg: Elections Manitoba.

=== 1977 ===
1977 Manitoba general election
Party	Candidate	Votes	%	±%
Progressive Conservative	Bob Anderson	5,843	55.45	14.28
New Democratic	Rene Toupin	3,995	37.91	-7.90
Liberal	Rita Roeland	700	6.64	-2.16
Total valid votes		10,538	–	–
Rejected		23	–	
Eligible voters / Turnout		12,952	81.54	0.91
Source(s) Source: Manitoba. Chief Electoral Officer (1999). Statement of Votes for the 37th Provincial General Election, September 21, 1999 (PDF) (Report). Winnipeg: Elections Manitoba.

=== 1981 ===
1981 Manitoba general election
Party	Candidate	Votes	%	±%
New Democratic	Andy Anstett	5,303	50.14	12.23
Progressive Conservative	Bob Anderson	4,833	45.70	-9.75
Liberal	Peter Sanderson	327	3.09	-3.55
Progressive	Dennis Sweatman	113	1.07	–
Total valid votes		10,576	–	–
Rejected		24	–	
Eligible voters / Turnout		13,880	76.37	-5.17
Source(s) Source: Manitoba. Chief Electoral Officer (1999). Statement of Votes for the 37th Provincial General Election, September 21, 1999 (PDF) (Report). Winnipeg: Elections Manitoba.

=== 1986 ===
1986 Manitoba general election
Party	Candidate	Votes	%	±%
Progressive Conservative	Gilles Roch	5,094	44.26	-1.44
New Democratic	Andy Anstett	5,039	43.78	-6.36
Liberal	Laurie Evans	1,376	11.96	8.86
Total valid votes		11,509	–	–
Rejected		28	–	
Eligible voters / Turnout		15,732	73.33	-3.03
Progressive Conservative gain from New Democratic		Swing		+2.46
Source(s) Source: Manitoba. Chief Electoral Officer (1999). Statement of Votes for the 37th Provincial General Election, September 21, 1999 (PDF) (Report). Winnipeg: Elections Manitoba.

=== 1988 ===
1988 Manitoba general election
Party	Candidate	Votes	%	±%
Progressive Conservative	Gilles Roch	5,815	43.49	-0.77
Liberal	Lance Laufer	3,806	28.47	16.51
New Democratic	Andy Anstett	3,749	28.04	-15.74
Total valid votes		13,370	–	–
Rejected		40	–	
Eligible voters / Turnout		17,251	77.73	4.40
Source(s) Source: Manitoba. Chief Electoral Officer (1999). Statement of Votes for the 37th Provincial General Election, September 21, 1999 (PDF) (Report). Winnipeg: Elections Manitoba.

=== 1990 ===
1990 Manitoba general election
Party	Candidate	Votes	%	±%
Progressive Conservative	Glen Findlay	5,146	49.11	5.62
New Democratic	D. Barron McNabb	3,374	32.20	4.16
Liberal	Bob Strong	1,958	18.69	-9.78
Total valid votes		10,478	–	–
Rejected		26	–	
Eligible voters / Turnout		14,311	73.40	-4.34
Source(s) Source: Manitoba. Chief Electoral Officer (1999). Statement of Votes for the 37th Provincial General Election, September 21, 1999 (PDF) (Report). Winnipeg: Elections Manitoba.

=== 1995 ===
1995 Manitoba general election
Party	Candidate	Votes	%	±%
Progressive Conservative	Glen Findlay	6,355	52.15	3.03
New Democratic	Steve Pochuk	4,275	35.08	2.88
Liberal	Bob Singh	1,461	11.99	-6.70
Libertarian	Francis Trueman	96	0.79	–
Total valid votes		12,187	–	–
Rejected		50	–	
Eligible voters / Turnout		15,809	77.41	4.01
Source(s) Source: Manitoba. Chief Electoral Officer (1999). Statement of Votes for the 37th Provincial General Election, September 21, 1999 (PDF) (Report). Winnipeg: Elections Manitoba.

=== 1999 ===
1999 Manitoba general election
Party	Candidate	Votes	%	±%	Expenditures
Progressive Conservative	Ron Schuler	4,969	49.69	-2.46	$25,718.76
New Democratic	Leonard Kimacovich	4,058	40.58	5.50	$26,227.00
Liberal	Patricia Aitken	771	7.71	-4.28	$13,962.00
Manitoba	Roger Woloshyn	203	2.03	–	$2,703.08
Total valid votes		10,001	–	–	
Rejected		44	–		
Eligible voters / turnout		13,026	77.12	-0.29	
Source(s) Source: Manitoba. Chief Electoral Officer (1999). Statement of Votes for the 37th Provincial General Election, September 21, 1999 (PDF) (Report). Winnipeg: Elections Manitoba.

=== 2003 ===
2003 Manitoba general election
Party	Candidate	Votes	%	±%	Expenditures
Progressive Conservative	Ron Schuler	4,917	60.62	10.94	$18,435.49
New Democratic	Georgine Spooner	2,512	30.97	-9.61	$9,788.75
Liberal	Vince Boileau	682	8.41	0.70	$11,096.08
Total valid votes		8,111	–	–	
Rejected		34	–		
Eligible voters / Turnout		14,599	55.79	-21.32	
Source(s) Source: Manitoba. Chief Electoral Officer (2003). Statement of Votes for the 38th Provincial General Election, June 3, 2003 (PDF) (Report). Winnipeg: Elections Manitoba.

=== 2007 ===
2007 Manitoba general election
Party	Candidate	Votes	%	±%	Expenditures
Progressive Conservative	Ron Schuler	5,165	58.46	-2.16	$25,538.14
New Democratic	Ernest Muswagon	2,656	30.06	-0.91	$7,505.06
Liberal	James Johnston	1,014	11.48	3.07	$4,606.05
Total valid votes		8,835	–	–	
Rejected		46	–		
Eligible voters / turnout		15,641	56.78	0.99	
Source(s) Source: Manitoba. Chief Electoral Officer (2007). Statement of Votes for the 39th Provincial General Election, May 22, 2007 (PDF) (Report). Winnipeg: Elections Manitoba.

== See also ==
- List of Manitoba provincial electoral districts
- Canadian provincial electoral districts
