= Bob Anderson (Canadian politician) =

Canadian politician (born 1939)

Robert Colin Anderson (born May 5, 1939) is a Canadian politician. A member of the Progressive Conservative Party of Manitoba, he was a member of the Legislative Assembly of Manitoba from 1977 to 1981.

Anderson was born on May 5, 1939, in St. Boniface, Winnipeg, the son of Robert Anderson and Lillian Marie (née Kraushar) Anderson. He was educated at the University of Manitoba and worked as a farmer. He served as a councillor in the municipality of Springfield, Manitoba, located east of Winnipeg, from 1968 to 1972. In 1966, he married Jean Edith Shelfontuk.

Anderson was elected to the Manitoba legislature in the provincial election of 1977, defeating incumbent New Democrat Rene Toupin by almost 2,000 votes in the riding of Springfield. The Tories won this election, and Anderson served as a backbench supporter of Sterling Lyon's government for the next four years. He lost to NDP candidate Andy Anstett by 470 votes in the 1981 election, and has not sought a return to the legislature since then.
