= William Dick (Manitoba politician) =

Canadian politician (1821–1904)

William Robert Dick (December 31, 1821 – March 31, 1904) was a Canadian lumber merchant and political figure in the province of Manitoba. He represented Springfield from 1875 to 1878 in the Legislative Assembly of Manitoba.

He was born in Kingston, Upper Canada and grew up in Victoria County. In 1845, Dick married Isabella Willock. He served twelve years as reeve of Fenelon Township. Dick moved to Manitoba in 1871 and became the first reeve of Springfield in 1873. He established a lumber business with his son-in-law William Ward Banning and later bought businesses in Rat Portage and Norman. Dick died in Winnipeg at the age of 82.
