= Charlie Birt =

Canadian politician

Charles T. Birt (born May 27, 1942 in Winnipeg, Manitoba) is a politician in Manitoba, Canada. He was a member of the Legislative Assembly of Manitoba from 1984 to 1988, representing the riding of Fort Garry for the Progressive Conservative Party.

Birt grew up in East Kildonan, was educated at Miles Macdonell Collegiate and at the University of Manitoba, and worked as a lawyer before entering political life. From 1980 to 1984, he was a member of the Winnipeg City Council. He also was a member of the Children's Aid Board of Winnipeg from 1980 to 1983, and served as a trustee for Victoria Hospital from 1980 to 1984.

He was first elected to the Manitoba legislature in a by-election held on October 2, 1984, following the resignation of Bud Sherman in Fort Garry. He was elected by more than 1,500 votes over his nearest opponent, Liberal leader Sharon Carstairs; Progressive Party leader Sidney Green placed fourth. Birt was re-elected over Nora Losey of the governing New Democratic Party in the 1986 provincial election.

Birt was defeated by Liberal candidate Laurie Evans in the 1988 election, ironically as the Progressive Conservatives formed a minority government. He has not sought a return to provincial politics since this time.

Birt remained active in the Winnipeg community since his defeat. Along with former Mayor Bill Norrie, he has recently been involved in a project to restore the Elmwood Cemetery.
