= Andy Anstett =

Canadian politician

Minister of Municipal Affairs
- In office November 4, 1983 – April 17, 1986
- Preceded by: Aimé Adam
- Succeeded by: John Bucklaschuk

Member of the Legislative Assembly of Manitoba for Springfield
- In office November 17, 1981 – April 26, 1988
- Preceded by: Bob Anderson
- Succeeded by: Gilles Roch

Personal details
- Born: Andrue John Anstett; June 25, 1946 (age 80) Groningen, Netherlands
- Party: New Democratic
- Education: University of Waterloo

Andrue John Anstett (born June 25, 1946) is a former politician in Manitoba, Canada. He served in the New Democratic Party government of Premier Howard Pawley, and made an unsuccessful bid for the party's leadership in 1988.

== Early life and education ==
Anstett was born in Groningen in the Netherlands, and immigrated to Kitchener, Ontario as an infant. He obtained an honours degree in political science from the University of Waterloo and did post-graduate studies in Canadian parliamentary procedure and election administration.

== Career ==
=== Early career ===
In 1973, Anstett moved to Manitoba upon his appointment as deputy clerk of the Legislative Assembly and deputy chief electoral officer for the province. He held these positions until resigning in 1979.

=== Political career ===
Anstett was elected to the Manitoba Legislative Assembly in the 1981 provincial election as a candidate of the New Democratic Party in the rural riding of Springfield. He was appointed Minister of Municipal Affairs on November 4, 1983, and also served as Government House Leader. When Howard Pawley introduced a constitutional amendment to address a court decision respecting French language rights in the 1980s, Anstett was a leading supporter of the measure. As Government House Leader, he was the minister responsible for the constitutional amendment, which was the subject of rancorous debate throughout the province. Most observers cite Anstett's leadership role in the unpopular constitutional amendment as the reason for his defeat by 55 votes by Progressive Conservative Gilles Roch in the election of 1986.

When the Pawley government lost a parliamentary vote of confidence in 1988, Anstett ran to succeed Pawley as leader. He placed third on the first ballot with 317 votes (out of 1,663 valid votes cast), and was eliminated on the second ballot despite the support of fourth-place candidate Maureen Hemphill. The NDP government was defeated in the election which followed, and was reduced to third party status. Anstett contested Springfield in this election, and finished third.

=== Later career and contributions ===
After his career in provincial politics ended, Anstett became chair of the Manitoba Municipal Board, and later served as chair of the Ontario Assessment Review Board until 1998. From 1998 to 2005, he was Vice President of Corporate Affairs for AEC-International in Toronto and through the International Property Tax Institute, United States Agency for International Development (USAID), the Lincoln Institute on Land Policy, the World Bank and the United Nations Development Programme, he advised governments in the developing world and in countries in transition in Eastern Europe on property assessment and tax policy. He was a property tax advisor to the government of Kyrgyzstan in 2002, and to the government of Macedonia in 2003-04. In 2005, he became director of legislation and policy support services with the Municipal Property Assessment Corporation in Ontario and subsequently served as senior policy and issues advisor in their president's office.

== Electoral record ==
1988 Manitoba general election: Springfield
Party	Candidate	Votes	%	±%
Progressive Conservative	Gilles Roch	5,815	43.49	-0.77
Liberal	Lance Laufer	3,806	28.47	16.51
New Democratic	Andy Anstett	3,749	28.04	-15.74
Total valid votes		13,370	–	–
Rejected		40	–	
Eligible voters / Turnout		17,251	77.73	4.40
Source(s) Source: Manitoba. Chief Electoral Officer (1999). Statement of Votes for the 37th Provincial General Election, September 21, 1999 (PDF) (Report). Winnipeg: Elections Manitoba.

1986 Manitoba general election: Springfield
Party	Candidate	Votes	%	±%
Progressive Conservative	Gilles Roch	5,094	44.26	-1.44
New Democratic	Andy Anstett	5,039	43.78	-6.36
Liberal	Laurie Evans	1,376	11.96	8.86
Total valid votes		11,509	–	–
Rejected		28	–	
Eligible voters / Turnout		15,732	73.33	-3.03
Progressive Conservative gain from New Democratic		Swing		+2.46
Source(s) Source: Manitoba. Chief Electoral Officer (1999). Statement of Votes for the 37th Provincial General Election, September 21, 1999 (PDF) (Report). Winnipeg: Elections Manitoba.

1981 Manitoba general election: Springfield
Party	Candidate	Votes	%	±%
New Democratic	Andy Anstett	5,303	50.14	12.23
Progressive Conservative	Bob Anderson	4,833	45.70	-9.75
Liberal	Peter Sanderson	327	3.09	-3.55
Progressive	Dennis Sweatman	113	1.07	–
Total valid votes		10,576	–	–
Rejected		24	–	
Eligible voters / Turnout		13,880	76.37	-5.17
Source(s) Source: Manitoba. Chief Electoral Officer (1999). Statement of Votes for the 37th Provincial General Election, September 21, 1999 (PDF) (Report). Winnipeg: Elections Manitoba.

== See also ==
- List of University of Waterloo people
