= Fort Garry (electoral district) =

Provincial electoral district in Manitoba, Canada

Coordinates: 49.830°N 97.157°W

Manitoba electoral district
- Location in Winnipeg

Provincial electoral district
- Legislature: Legislative Assembly of Manitoba
MLA
Mark Wasyliw
Independent
- District created: 1957
- First contested: 1958
- Last contested: 2023

Fort Garry is a provincial electoral district of Manitoba, Canada, that existed from 1958 to 2011 and was re-created in 2019. It was first created by redistribution in 1957 from parts of Iberville, Assiniboia and St. Boniface, and formally existed beginning with the 1958 provincial election. The riding is in the south-central and southwestern region of the city of Winnipeg. It is named for the historical Fort Garry which was occupied by supporters of Louis Riel during the Red River Rebellion of 1870.

Fort Garry was bordered to the east by Riel and St. Vital (across the Red River of the North), to the south by St. Norbert, to the north by Lord Roberts, and to the west by Fort Whyte. It was a mostly middle-class residential area, with some small businesses. It contained the University of Manitoba's main campus until electoral redistribution in 2008 took effect at the 2011 Manitoba general election, placing the campus in the new district of Fort Richmond.

The riding's population in 1996 was 20,383. In 1999, the average family income was $50,720, and the unemployment rate was 6.40% (though, conversely, it may be noted that 26% of the riding's residents are listed as low-income). Over 16% of Fort Garry's residents were immigrants, with 5% listing German as their ethnic origin. Almost 23% of the riding's residents have a university degree.

The service sector accounted for 17% of Fort Garry's industry, with a further 12% each in the retail trade and educational services.

Historically, Fort Garry was a safe seat for the Progressive Conservatives, who represented the riding from 1958 to 1988 and again from 1990 to 2003. Future Premier Sterling Lyon was Fort Garry's first member of the Legislative Assembly (MLA). In the provincial election of 1999, however, the New Democratic Party (NDP) came within only 30 votes of winning the riding. They made it their primary target in the 2003 election, and won it for the first time in their history.

Fort Garry's last MLA before dissolution was Kerri Irvin-Ross of the NDP, who was re-elected in the 2007 provincial election with 53% of the vote.

Following the 2008 electoral boundary redistribution, Fort Garry was abolished. Most of its territory was divided between the new ridings of Fort Garry-Riverview and Fort Richmond, with a smaller portion going to St. Norbert.

Following the 2018 redistribution, the riding was re-created from Fort Garry-Riverview, Fort Rouge, River Heights, and Fort Richmond. Fort Garry was contested in the 2019 provincial election. It is bordered by River Heights to the northwest, Fort Rouge to the northeast, St. Vital to the east, Riel to the southeast, Fort Richmond to the south, Waverley to the southwest, and Fort Whyte to the west.

== Members of the Legislative Assembly ==
Assembly	Years	Member	Party
Riding created from Iberville, Assiniboia, and St. Boniface
25th	1958–1959	Sterling Lyon	Progressive Conservative
26th	1959–1962	Sterling Lyon	Progressive Conservative
27th	1962–1966	Sterling Lyon	Progressive Conservative
28th	1966–1969	Sterling Lyon	Progressive Conservative
29th	1969–1973	Bud Sherman	Progressive Conservative
30th	1973–1977	Bud Sherman	Progressive Conservative
31st	1977–1981	Bud Sherman	Progressive Conservative
32nd	1981–1981	Bud Sherman	Progressive Conservative
32nd	1984-1986	Charles Birt	Progressive Conservative
33rd	1986–1988	Charles Birt	Progressive Conservative
34th	1988–1990	Laurie Evans	Liberal
35th	1990–1995	Rosemary Vodrey	Progressive Conservative
36th	1995–1999	Rosemary Vodrey	Progressive Conservative
37th	1999–2003	Joy Smith	Progressive Conservative
38th	2003–2007	Kerri Irvin-Ross	New Democratic
39th	2007–2011	Kerri Irvin-Ross	New Democratic
Riding dissolved into Fort Garry-Riverview, Fort Rouge and St. Norbert
Riding re-created from Fort Garry-Riverview, Fort Rouge, River Heights, and Fort Richmond
42nd	2019–2023	Mark Wasyliw	New Democratic
43rd	2023–2024	Mark Wasyliw	New Democratic
43rd	2024–present	Mark Wasyliw	Independent

== Election results ==
=== 1958 ===
1958 Manitoba general election
Party	Candidate	Votes	%
Progressive Conservative	Sterling Lyon	3,731	52.01
Liberal–Progressive	Leslie Fennell	2,408	33.57
Co-operative Commonwealth	Nena Woodward	1,035	14.43
Total valid votes		7,174	99.39
Total rejected ballots		44	0.61
Turnout		7,218	61.10
Eligible voters		11,813	
Source(s) Source: Manitoba. Chief Electoral Officer (1999). Statement of Votes for the 37th Provincial General Election, September 21, 1999 (PDF) (Report). Winnipeg: Elections Manitoba.

=== 1959 ===
1959 Manitoba general election
Party	Candidate	Votes	%	±%
Progressive Conservative	Sterling Lyon	4,842	58.69	+6.68
Liberal–Progressive	Stan Farwell	2,035	24.67	-8.90
Co-operative Commonwealth	Nena Woodward	1,373	16.46	+2.22
Total valid votes		8,250	99.41	
Total rejected ballots		49	0.59	-0.02
Turnout		8,299	68.80	+7.70
Eligible voters		12,062		
Progressive Conservative hold		Swing		+7.79
Source(s) Source:Manitoba. Chief Electoral Officer (1999). Statement of Votes for the 37th Provincial General Election, September 21, 1999 (PDF) (Report). Winnipeg: Elections Manitoba.

=== 1962 ===
1962 Manitoba general election
Party	Candidate	Votes	%	±%
Progressive Conservative	Sterling Lyon	4,721	54.16	-4.53
Liberal	David Bowles	2,828	32.44	+7.78
New Democratic	Cliff Brownridge	1,168	13.40	-3.24
Total valid votes		8,717	98.81	
Total rejected ballots		105	1.19	+0.60
Turnout		8,822	66.05	-2.76
Eligible voters		13,357		
Progressive Conservative hold		Swing		-6.15
Source(s) Source: Manitoba. Chief Electoral Officer (1999). Statement of Votes for the 37th Provincial General Election, September 21, 1999 (PDF) (Report). Winnipeg: Elections Manitoba.

=== 1966 ===
1966 Manitoba general election
Party	Candidate	Votes	%	±%
Progressive Conservative	Sterling Lyon	6,131	59.32	+5.16
Liberal	Peter Stokes	2,435	23.56	-8.88
New Democratic	Victor Ratsma	1,769	17.12	+3.72
Total valid votes		10,335	99.75	
Total rejected ballots		26	0.25	-0.94
Turnout		10,361	66.89	+0.84
Eligible voters		10,335		
Progressive Conservative hold		Swing		+7.02
Source(s) Source: Manitoba. Chief Electoral Officer (1999). Statement of Votes for the 37th Provincial General Election, September 21, 1999 (PDF) (Report). Winnipeg: Elections Manitoba.

=== 1969 ===
1969 Manitoba general election
Party	Candidate	Votes	%	±%
Progressive Conservative	Bud Sherman	3,570	47.17	-12.16
New Democratic	G. Grant Cosby	2,063	27.26	10.14
Liberal	Richard Alan "Dick" Wankling	1,936	25.58	2.02
Total valid votes		7,569	–	–
Rejected		20	–	
Eligible voters / Turnout		9,906	76.61	9.72
Source(s) Source: Manitoba. Chief Electoral Officer (1999). Statement of Votes for the 37th Provincial General Election, September 21, 1999 (PDF) (Report). Winnipeg: Elections Manitoba.

=== 1973 ===
1973 Manitoba general election
Party	Candidate	Votes	%	±%
Progressive Conservative	Bud Sherman	4,783	36.46	-10.71
Liberal	Henry Janzen	4,331	33.01	7.43
New Democratic	C. G. "Giff" Gifford	4,006	30.53	3.28
Total valid votes		13,120	–	–
Rejected		58	–	
Eligible voters / Turnout		15,928	82.73	6.12
Source(s) Source: Manitoba. Chief Electoral Officer (1999). Statement of Votes for the 37th Provincial General Election, September 21, 1999 (PDF) (Report). Winnipeg: Elections Manitoba.

=== 1977 ===
1977 Manitoba general election
Party	Candidate	Votes	%	±%
Progressive Conservative	Bud Sherman	10,052	60.44	23.98
New Democratic	Ruth Pear	4,157	24.99	-5.54
Liberal	Beth Candlish	2,423	14.57	-18.44
Total valid votes		16,632	–	–
Rejected		27	–	
Eligible voters / Turnout		21,742	76.62	-6.11
Source(s) Source: Manitoba. Chief Electoral Officer (1999). Statement of Votes for the 37th Provincial General Election, September 21, 1999 (PDF) (Report). Winnipeg: Elections Manitoba.

=== 1981 ===
1981 Manitoba general election
Party	Candidate	Votes	%	±%
Progressive Conservative	Bud Sherman	6,227	55.71	-4.73
New Democratic	Hans Wittich	3,705	33.15	8.15
Liberal	Lil Haus	1,042	9.32	-5.25
Progressive	James Goodridge	203	1.82	–
Total valid votes		11,177	–	–
Rejected		12	–	
Eligible voters / Turnout		15,346	72.91	-3.71
Source(s) Source: Manitoba. Chief Electoral Officer (1999). Statement of Votes for the 37th Provincial General Election, September 21, 1999 (PDF) (Report). Winnipeg: Elections Manitoba.

=== 1984 by-election ===
Manitoba provincial by-election, October 2, 1984 Resignation of Bud Sherman
Party	Candidate	Votes	%	±%
Progressive Conservative	Charlie Birt	3,561	44.59	-11.12
Liberal	Sharon Carstairs	1,993	24.96	15.63
New Democratic	Shirley Lord	1,211	15.16	-17.98
Progressive	Sidney Green	1,035	12.96	11.14
WCC	Fred Cameron	186	2.33	–
Total valid votes		7,986	–	–
Rejected		N/A	–	
Eligible voters / Turnout		N/A	–	–
Source(s) Source: Manitoba. Chief Electoral Officer (1999). Statement of Votes for the 37th Provincial General Election, September 21, 1999 (PDF) (Report). Winnipeg: Elections Manitoba.

=== 1986 ===
1986 Manitoba general election
Party	Candidate	Votes	%	±%
Progressive Conservative	Charlie Birt	5,146	48.45	3.86
New Democratic	Nora Losey	3,158	29.73	14.57
Liberal	Ian Band	2,114	19.90	-5.05
WCC	Ivan Merritt	204	1.92	-0.41
Total valid votes		10,622	–	–
Rejected		23	–	
Eligible voters / Turnout		16,072	66.23	–
Source(s) Source: Manitoba. Chief Electoral Officer (1999). Statement of Votes for the 37th Provincial General Election, September 21, 1999 (PDF) (Report). Winnipeg: Elections Manitoba.

=== 1988 ===
1988 Manitoba general election
Party	Candidate	Votes	%	±%
Liberal	Laurie Evans	6,055	46.58	26.68
Progressive Conservative	Charlies Birt	5,173	39.80	-8.65
New Democratic	Brian Pannell	1,553	11.95	-17.78
Western Independence	Ivan Merritt	173	1.33	-0.60
Communist	Millie Lamb	45	0.35	–
Total valid votes		12,999	–	–
Rejected		12	–	
Eligible voters / turnout		16,634	78.22	11.99
Liberal gain from Progressive Conservative		Swing		+17.67
Source(s) Source: Manitoba. Chief Electoral Officer (1999). Statement of Votes for the 37th Provincial General Election, September 21, 1999 (PDF) (Report). Winnipeg: Elections Manitoba.

=== 1990 ===
1990 Manitoba general election
Party	Candidate	Votes	%	±%
Progressive Conservative	Rosemary Vodrey	5,105	47.07	7.27
Liberal	Laurie Evans	3,992	36.81	-9.77
New Democratic	Shirley Lord	1,500	13.83	1.88
Western Independence	Jan Mandseth	249	2.30	0.96
Total valid votes		10,846	–	–
Rejected		17	–	
Eligible voters / turnout		14,890	72.96	-5.26
Progressive Conservative gain from Liberal		Swing		+8.52
Source(s) Source: Manitoba. Chief Electoral Officer (1999). Statement of Votes for the 37th Provincial General Election, September 21, 1999 (PDF) (Report). Winnipeg: Elections Manitoba.

=== 1995 ===
1995 Manitoba general election
Party	Candidate	Votes	%	±%	Expenditures
Progressive Conservative	Rosemary Vodrey	5,959	48.29	1.22	$32,899.54
Liberal	Jim Woodman	4,434	35.93	-0.88	$34,086.38
New Democratic	Brock Holowachuk	1,857	15.05	1.22	$1,399.00
Libertarian	Alex Pressey	91	0.74	–	$124.74
Total valid votes		12,341	–	–	
Rejected		53	–		
Eligible voters / turnout		17,418	71.16	-1.80	
Source(s) Source: Manitoba. Chief Electoral Officer (1999). Statement of Votes for the 37th Provincial General Election, September 21, 1999 (PDF) (Report). Winnipeg: Elections Manitoba.

=== 1999 ===
1999 Manitoba general election
Party	Candidate	Votes	%	±%	Expenditures
Progressive Conservative	Joy Smith	4,436	43.92	-4.37	$28,543.84
New Democratic	Lawrie Cherniack	4,406	43.62	28.57	$29,325.00
Liberal	Ted Gilson	1,143	11.32	-24.61	$9,808.98
Manitoba	Denise Van Rooyen	116	1.15	–	$1,032.59
Total valid votes		10,101	–	–	
Rejected		37	–		
Eligible voters / turnout		13,502	75.09	3.93	
Source(s) Source: Manitoba. Chief Electoral Officer (1999). Statement of Votes for the 37th Provincial General Election, September 21, 1999 (PDF) (Report). Winnipeg: Elections Manitoba.

=== 2003 ===
2003 Manitoba general election
Party	Candidate	Votes	%	±%	Expenditures
New Democratic	Kerri Irvin-Ross	3,852	46.75	3.13	$21,049.74
Progressive Conservative	Joy Smith	3,765	45.69	1.78	$29,935.35
Liberal	Taran Malik	562	6.82	-4.50	$13,984.00
Independent	Didz Zuzens	61	0.74	–	$395.34
Total valid votes		8,240	–	–	
Rejected		55	–		
Eligible voters / turnout		13,066	63.49	-11.60	
Source(s) Source: Manitoba. Chief Electoral Officer (2003). Statement of Votes for the 38th Provincial General Election, June 3, 2003 (PDF) (Report). Winnipeg: Elections Manitoba.

=== 2007 ===
2007 Manitoba general election
Party	Candidate	Votes	%	±%	Expenditures
New Democratic	Kerri Irvin-Ross	4,291	52.60	5.85	$28,543.84
Progressive Conservative	Shaun McCaffrey	2,101	25.75	-19.94	$16,517.08
Liberal	Craig Hildahl	1,500	18.39	11.57	$14,094.14
Green	Alon Weinberg	266	3.26	–	$55.55
Total valid votes		8,158	–	–	
Rejected		36	–		
Eligible voters / turnout		12,404	66.06	2.57	
Source(s) Source: Manitoba. Chief Electoral Officer (2007). Statement of Votes for the 39th Provincial General Election, May 22, 2007 (PDF) (Report). Winnipeg: Elections Manitoba.

=== 2019 ===
2016 provincial election redistributed results
Party	%
Progressive Conservative	37.7
New Democratic	35.9
Liberal	13.5
Green	12.5
Others	0.4

2019 Manitoba general election
Party	Candidate	Votes	%	±%	Expenditures
New Democratic	Mark Wasyliw	4,003	42.35	+6.5	$23,569.90
Progressive Conservative	Nancy Cooke	3,007	31.81	-5.9	$29,491.08
Liberal	Craig Larkins	1,719	18.19	+4.7	$5,839.65
Green	Casey Fennessy	723	7.65	-4.8	$15.08
Total valid votes		9,452	–	–	
Rejected		47	–		
Eligible voters / turnout		15,399	61.69	-4.37	
New Democratic notional gain from Progressive Conservative		Swing		+6.2	
Source(s) Source: Manitoba. Chief Electoral Officer (2019). Statement of Votes for the 42nd Provincial General Election, September 10, 2019 (PDF) (Report). Winnipeg: Elections Manitoba. "Candidate Election Returns". Elections Manitoba. Elections Manitoba.

=== 2023 ===
2023 Manitoba general election
Party	Candidate	Votes	%	±%	Expenditures
New Democratic	Mark Wasyliw	5,319	58.82	+16.47	$26,232.97
Progressive Conservative	Rick Shone	2,405	26.60	-5.22	$7,032.45
Liberal	Shandi Strong	1,082	11.97	-6.22	$11,604.00
Green	Aaron Kowal	237	2.62	-5.03	$749.43
Total valid votes/expense limit		9,043	99.46	–	$60,307.00
Total rejected and declined ballots		49	0.54	–	
Turnout		9,092	58.75	-2.94	
Eligible voters		15,476			
New Democratic hold		Swing		+10.84	
Source(s) Source: Elections Manitoba

== See also ==
- List of Manitoba provincial electoral districts
- Canadian provincial electoral districts
