= John Sutherland (Manitoba politician) =

Canadian farmer and Manitoba politician (1837–1922)

John Sutherland (December 23, 1837 – May 31, 1922) was a farmer and political figure in Manitoba. He represented Kildonan from 1871 to 1874 and from 1875 to 1878 in the Legislative Assembly of Manitoba.

He was born at Kildoun, Rupert's Land, the son of Alexander Sutherland and Christy McBeth. Sutherland was superintendent for the Old Kildonan Sunday School. In 1862, he married Flora Polson. Sutherland was named Minister of Public Works but refused the office, having differences of opinion with other cabinet members.

He was buried in Kildonan.
