= Thomas Henry Smith (Canadian politician) =

Canadian politician

- Born: July 3, 1848
- Died: June 14, 1919 (aged 70)
- Occupations: Farmer and Political figure

Thomas Henry Smith (July 3, 1848 – June 14, 1919) was an English-born farmer and political figure in Manitoba. He represented Springfield from 1886 to 1903 in the Legislative Assembly of Manitoba as a Conservative, then as an independent member and later as a Liberal.

He came to Canada in 1865 with archbishop Robert Machray and later settled on a farm in the Springfield district of Manitoba. Smith married Margaret Matheson. He was defeated when he ran for reelection to the Manitoba assembly in 1903.

He died on his farm in Springfield at the age of 70.
