= John James Bird =

Canadian politician

John James Bird (September 11, 1844 – January 2, 1933), was a Metis political figure in Manitoba. He represented Kildonan from 1892 to 1895 in the Legislative Assembly of Manitoba as a Liberal.

John Bird was born in 1844, the son of Joseph Bird (Metis) and Elizabeth Thomas (Metis). Bird married Mary Peebles, a widow, in 1871. Their son, Frederick V. Bird (1885-1977) was a well known physician and Mayor of Boissevain.

John was elected as a Liberal M.L.A. in Kildonan in 1892 and defeated in the election of 1896. He also served as reeve of the Rural Municipality of St. Andrews. Bird was defeated when he ran for reelection to the provincial assembly in 1896. He died at St. Andrews, Manitoba on 2 January 1933.
