= Charles Albert Tanner =

Canadian politician (1887-1970)

Charles Albert Tanner (January 29, 1887—February 12, 1970) was a politician in Manitoba, Canada. He served in the Legislative Assembly of Manitoba from 1920 to 1927, as a member of the Labour Party.

Tanner was first elected to the Manitoba legislature in the provincial election of 1920, defeating Liberal and Farmer candidates in the Winnipeg-area constituency of Kildonan and St. Andrews. He was re-elected in the 1922 election by a greater margin. Tanner served on the opposition benches throughout his time in the legislature.

He appears to have sought re-election in the 1927 campaign as a supporter of the Progressive government of John Bracken, though still identifying himself as a "Labour" candidate. He was defeated, finishing third against Conservative James McLenaghen.

Tanner ran for the House of Commons of Canada in the federal election of 1930, as a candidate of the Independent Labour Party in Winnipeg South. He finished a distant third against Conservative Ronald Rogers. At the time, he listed his occupation as "editor".
