= A. J. Reid =

Canadian politician

Anthony (Tony) John Reid (ca 1909 – February 9, 1993) was a politician in Manitoba, Canada. He served in the Legislative Assembly of Manitoba from 1958 to 1962, originally for the Cooperative Commonwealth Federation and later for its successor party, the NDP.

Born in East Kildonan, Manitoba, Reid worked 42 years for the Canadian Pacific Railway.

He was first elected to the Manitoba legislature in the 1958 provincial election, defeating Progressive Conservative J.E. Willis by 111 votes in the northeast Winnipeg constituency of Kildonan. He was re-elected over Willis by 148 votes in the 1959 election, despite a provincial swing to the Progressive Conservatives.

During the 1962 provincial election, the, PC candidate James Mills defeated Reid by only four votes after two recounts on January 4, 1963, after a judicial recount.

Reid was known as a maverick who drifted from the CCF line on some issues. After 1963, he returned to municipal politics as an alderman for East Kildonan.
