= William Henry Corbett =

Canadian politician (1847–1941)

- Born: July 6, 1847; Cavan, Canada West
- Died: November 25, 1941 (aged 94); Winnipeg, Manitoba, Canada
- Occupation(s): farmer, politician

William Henry Corbett (July 6, 1847 – November 25, 1941) was a farmer and political figure in Manitoba. He represented Springfield from 1903 to 1907 in the Legislative Assembly of Manitoba as a Conservative.

== Early life and career ==
He was born in Cavan, Ontario and came to Winnipeg, Manitoba in 1871. He settled in Springfield and served as reeve for the Rural Municipality of Springfield for 14 years. Corbett married Jennie Wright.

== Death ==
He died at home in Winnipeg in 1941.

== Personal life ==
His son Albert also served in the Manitoba assembly.
