= Clifford Barclay =

Canadian politician (1876–1961)

Clifford Barclay (August 20, 1876 – February 22, 1961) was a politician in Manitoba, Canada. He served as a member of the Legislative Assembly of Manitoba from 1922 to 1927, and again from 1932 to 1936.

Barclay was born in Turriff, Aberdeenshire, Scotland, the son of Hugh Barclay and Imogene Smedley, and came to Manitoba in 1911. He settled near Tyndall. Barclay served with the Royal Engineers during World War I. He was reeve of the Rural Municipality of Brokenhead from 1932 to 1933.

He was first elected to the Manitoba legislature in the 1922 provincial election, as a candidate of the United Farmers of Manitoba (UFM). Campaigning in the electoral district of Springfield, he defeated Liberal candidate William Black by 160 votes. The UFM unexpectedly won a majority of seats in this election, and formed government as the Progressive Party of Manitoba. Barclay was selected as chairman of the caucus meeting which selected John Bracken as the party leader.

Barclay served as a backbench supporter of Bracken's government for the next five years. He was defeated in the 1927 provincial election, losing to Liberal Murdoch Mackay by eighteen votes.

In 1932, the Progressive and Liberal parties formed an electoral alliance to prevent the Conservatives from coming to power. Candidates supported by the government were called "Liberal-Progressives", and Mackay ran under this banner in Springfield. Despite Barclay's background with the Progressive Party, he ran against Mackay as an independent "Farmer-Labour" candidate, and won election by 652 votes. He was injured in an automobile accident on the night of the vote, but recovered to take his seat in the legislature.

Once elected, Barclay appears to have become a government supporter again. He was offered re-nomination as a Liberal-Progressive in the 1936 election, but declined.

In 1943, he was named agricultural representative on the National War Services board, replacing William Bryce.

He died in Winnipeg at the age of 84.
