= Gilles Roch =

Canadian politician

Gilles Roch (born August 26, 1952 in Winnipeg, Manitoba) is a politician in Manitoba, Canada. He was a member of the Legislative Assembly of Manitoba from 1986 to 1990, representing the rural riding of Springfield.

The son of Marcel Roch, he worked as a hotel manager before entering political life. He was a board member of the Tourist Industry Association of Manitoba, and was also a member of the Franco-Manitoban School Trustees Association. Unlike most Franco-Manitoba politicians, Roch was an evangelical Christian rather than a Roman Catholic.

Roch's political career followed an unusual course. He initially supported the Liberals, but defected to the Progressive Conservative Party in 1986 when the Liberals denied him permission to run as a candidate for the party. In the provincial election of 1986, Roch was elected in Springfield as a Progressive Conservative, defeating incumbent New Democrat Andy Anstett by 55 votes. He was re-elected by a much greater margin in the 1988 election, in which the Progressive Conservatives formed a minority government under Gary Filmon.

Roch, against his expectations, was not appointed to Filmon's cabinet following the election. On September 8, 1988, he crossed the floor to rejoin the Liberal Party, which was the official opposition in the legislature at the time. These changing allegiances won Roch few supporters, and he did not seek re-election in the 1990 election.
