= Martin O'Donohoe =

Canadian politician (1868–1909)

Martin J. O'Donohoe (January 1, 1868 – April 15, 1909) was a hotel keeper and political figure in Manitoba. He represented Kildonan and St. Andrews from 1903 to 1907 in the Legislative Assembly of Manitoba as a Liberal.

== Biography ==
He was born and educated in Ontario, of Irish descent. In 1903, O'Donohoe married May Marshall.

He was defeated when he ran for reelection to the Manitoba assembly in 1907. O'Donohoe died in Winnipeg at the age of 41.
