= James Mills (Manitoba politician) =

Canadian politician

James Thomas Mills (June 22, 1914 in Winnipeg, Manitoba – February 15, 1997) was a politician in Manitoba, Canada. He served as a Progressive Conservative member of the Legislative Assembly of Manitoba from 1963 to 1966.

Mills was educated at Immaculate Conception School and St. Paul's High School in Winnipeg, and worked as a merchant in Winnipeg after his graduation. He served as a member of the Royal Canadian Mounted Police from 1939 to 1945, and was active in the local rotary clubs and Knights of Columbus.

His election to the legislature occurred under unusual circumstances after two recounts in the 1962 election in Kildonan. Mills was the Progressive Conservative candidate in this election, and defeated New Democratic Party incumbent A. J. Reid by a mere four votes. Mills was a backbench supporter of Dufferin Roblin's government during his time in office.

In the 1966 election, and Mills lost to Peter Fox of the NDP by 836 votes. He did not seek a return to the legislature after this time.

Mills was also a city alderman in the former City of East Kildonan at the time of his election to the legislature, and a member of the Metro Winnipeg election committee. In 1968, he moved to Victoria, British Columbia where he operated a lady's wear store and then became a real estate agent. He died there at the age of 82.
