= George Olive =

Canadian politician

George Edward Olive (born 1887 in Leeds, England; died April 20, 1973) was a politician in Manitoba, Canada. He served in the Legislative Assembly of Manitoba from 1945 to 1953, as a member of the social-democratic Cooperative Commonwealth Federation (CCF).

Olive came to Canada in 1910. He settled in Transcona, then an independent working-class community adjoining but independent of Winnipeg, in 1914. He was a member of the United Association of Steamfitters and Plumbers, working for the Canadian National Railway. He served as a member of the local school board, and was elected Mayor of Transcona in 1936, a position he continued to hold after being elected to the provincial legislature. He married Amy Thackray (1888–1955), and they had two sons, Bill and Joe, both of whom served overseas in the Royal Canadian Navy during World War II.

He was first elected to the Manitoba legislature in the 1945 provincial election, defeating former Liberal leader Murdoch Mackay in the constituency of Springfield. He was re-elected in Kildonan—Transcona in the 1949 election, defeating Liberal-Progressive candidate M. J. G. McMullen by just under 900 votes.

Olive was not a frequent debater in the legislature, but was known as a diligent worker and was said to have extensive knowledge of every bill that came before the house. CCF leader Lloyd Stinson once called him "a most useful and cooperative member of caucus", assisting other members behind the scenes.

He sought the Kildonan—Transcona CCF nomination again for the 1953 provincial election, but lost to Russell Paulley, who was mayor of Transcona by this time. Olive accepted the result, and agreed to work as Paulley's election agent.

He lived in New York City after his retirement and later died in Winnipeg.

George Olive Nature Park in Winnipeg, Manitoba, commemorates him. Previously, the site hosted a dump for industrial byproducts and a pond for horses. It was rehabilitated into a nature park in the 1990s and opened as such in 2001.
