= John Sutherland (senator) =

Canadian politician

John Sutherland (August 21, 1821 – April 27, 1899) was a Canadian farmer and politician from Manitoba.

== Early life ==
Sutherland was born in Point Douglas in what was then the Red River Colony, and was educated at St. John's College, Following the flood of 1852, he moved to East Kildonan where he operated a general store and farmed. Later in life, Sutherland helped found Manitoba College.

== Political career ==
In 1866, Sutherland was appointed to the Council of Assiniboia which had been created by the Hudson's Bay Company to govern the territory until it was dissolved in 1870.

During the Red River Rebellion, Sutherland was a leader of the "loyalists" and was a delegate to the Convention of Forty in 1870. In February 1870, the Provisional Government of the Red River Colony appointed Sutherland Collector of Customs. When Manitoba entered Canadian Confederation on July 15, 1870, Sutherland was appointed the first High Sheriff of Manitoba and held the office until December 1871, when he was appointed to the Senate of Canada by Sir John A. Macdonald. He sat on the Senate as an Independent Conservative until his death in 1899.
