= Manitoba College =

Former college in Winnipeg, Canada

Coordinates: 49°53′38″N 97°09′04″W

- Active: 1877–1967
- Affiliations: Presbyterian
- Location: Winnipeg, Manitoba, Canada

Manitoba College was a college that existed in Winnipeg, Manitoba, Canada, from 1871 to 1967, when it became one of the University of Winnipeg and University of Manitoba’s founding colleges. It was one of the first institutions of higher learning in the city of Winnipeg and the province of Manitoba. The first graduating class had 12 members.

== History ==
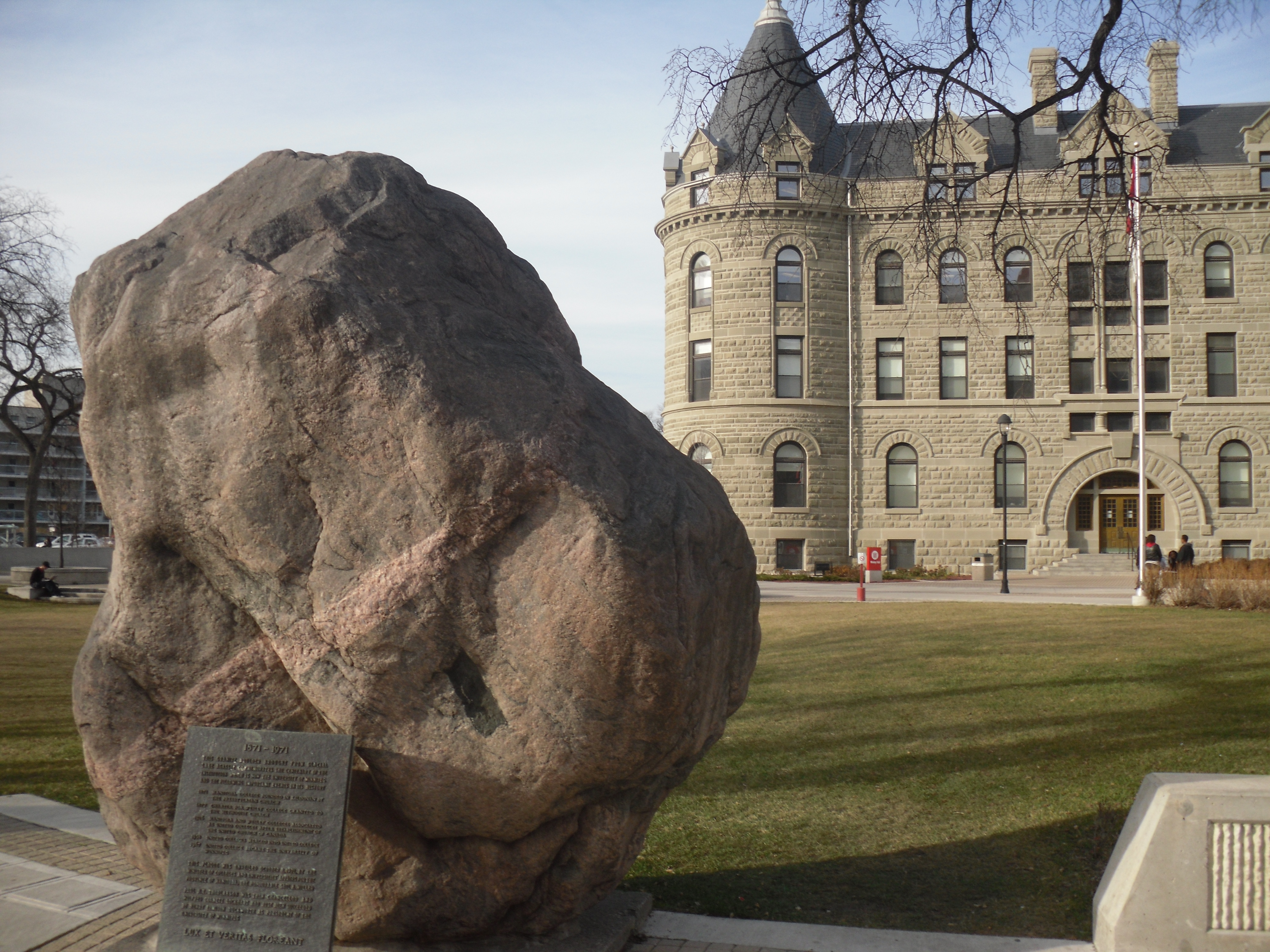
Rock of Remembrance commemorates 100th anniversary of Manitoba College, pictured in front of the University of Winnipeg

In 1864, the Kildonan Presbyterian Church, under the leadership of Reverend James Nisbet (who had been sent west to assist Kildonan's minister Reverend John Black), built a school (later to be named Nisbet Hall in his honour) in Kildonan. This school was located directly to the north and east of the church grounds along the river, near Main Street near Chief Peguis Trail. In 1871 the school was formally established as Manitoba College, a religious school affiliated with the Presbyterian Church. In 1872 a new two-story building was constructed on property adjacent south to become the new home for Manitoba College (Nisbet Hall remaining the school for elementary classes). Rev. George Bryce and Thomas Hart, along with Rev. Black, were employed as instructors and taught a variety of subjects including sciences, modern languages, Latin and Greek.

Manitoba College was moved to Winnipeg in 1874, but it remained a small and financially insecure institution, dependant of subsidies from the Presbyterian church organizations in eastern Canada.

In 1877, Manitoba College collaborated with two church colleges, St. Boniface College Roman Catholic and St John's Anglican, to form the University of Manitoba, a degree-granting organization that set educational standards for all three schools. Unlike these two colleges, Manitoba College's student body included some who were not studying theological subjects; the new university expanded this secular side and offered courses towards a Bachelor of Arts degree. In 1882, Manitoba College opened a new building on Ellice Avenue.

In 1913, Manitoba College and Wesley College attempted to partner as the "United Colleges". This experimentation ended in 1914 and the colleges reverted to their independence. Manitoba College discontinued its instruction in the Arts though it continued to operate as a college within the University of Manitoba. In the 1900s, the college briefly held missionary training courses for members of the Independent Greek Church. From 1920 to 1939 it offered a program for women studying to be deaconesses. In 1925, it became affiliated with the United Church.

In 1931, Manitoba College sold its property to St. John's College. It continued operations and taught theology in rental space at St. John's and Wesley College.

In 1938, Manitoba College merged with Wesley College to form "United College."

In 1967, United College received its charter and became the University of Winnipeg. Wilfred Lockhart became the University of Winnipeg's first president and served from 1967 and 1971.

In 2017, the University of Winnipeg celebrated its 50th anniversary.

== Notable faculty ==
- Marion Bryce (1839-1920)
