= Manitoba Justice =

Government department in Manitoba, Canada

- Justice Manitoba

Department overview
- Formed: 1988
- Preceding Department: Department of the Attorney General
- Type: Justice department
- Jurisdiction: Government of Manitoba
- Headquarters: 450 Broadway, Winnipeg, Manitoba
- Employees: 3,161 FTE (2019–20); 3,343 FTE (2017–18)
- Annual budget: $659.3 m CAD (2019–20)
- Minister responsible: Matt Wiebe, Minister of Justice and Attorney General
- Deputy Minister responsible: Jeremy Akerstream, Deputy Minister of Justice and Deputy Attorney General
- Key documents: The Department of Justice Act; The Victims' Bill of Rights
- Website: www.gov.mb.ca/justice

Manitoba Justice (French: Justice Manitoba), or the Department of Justice (Le ministere de la justice; formerly the Department of the Attorney General), is the provincial government department responsible for administering the Crown Law justice systems in the province of Manitoba.

More specifically, Manitoba Justice deals with the provision of correctional services; the protection of personal and property rights; the drafting of legislation; provision of civil and criminal court services; the provision of civil legal services to government; and development of law reform. Within these areas of concern, Manitoba Justice looks over the Law Enforcement Review Agency (LERA), the Office of the Chief Medical Examiner, and the Public Guardian and Trustee, among others. Manitoba Justice also provides funding to several independent bodies, including the Law Reform Commission, Legal Aid Manitoba, and Manitoba Human Rights Commission.

Established in 1871, the Department of the Attorney General was one of the first departments formed by the newly-established Province of Manitoba—however, the initial legislation related to the Department, the Attorney General's Act, would not be passed until 1885.

The department is overseen by a cabinet minister known as the Minister of Justice and Attorney General (French: Ministre de la Justice et procureur général), currently Matt Wiebe. The minister who holds this office is typically also designated as Keeper of the Great Seal of the Province of Manitoba (French: Gardien du Grand Sceau de la province du Manitoba). (Note: "The Great Seal of the Province of Manitoba | Manitoba." Encyclopædia Britannica. Retrieved 25 January 2021.)

== History and legislation ==
Authority for administering justice within each province and territory of Canada was assigned to provincial governments by section 92(14) of the federal Constitution Act, 1867. Manitoba's justice arm, the Department of the Attorney General, was formed in 1871, becoming one of the first departments formed by the newly-established province. However, the initial legislation related to the Department, the Attorney General's Act, would not be passed until 1885.

Department of Justice Act
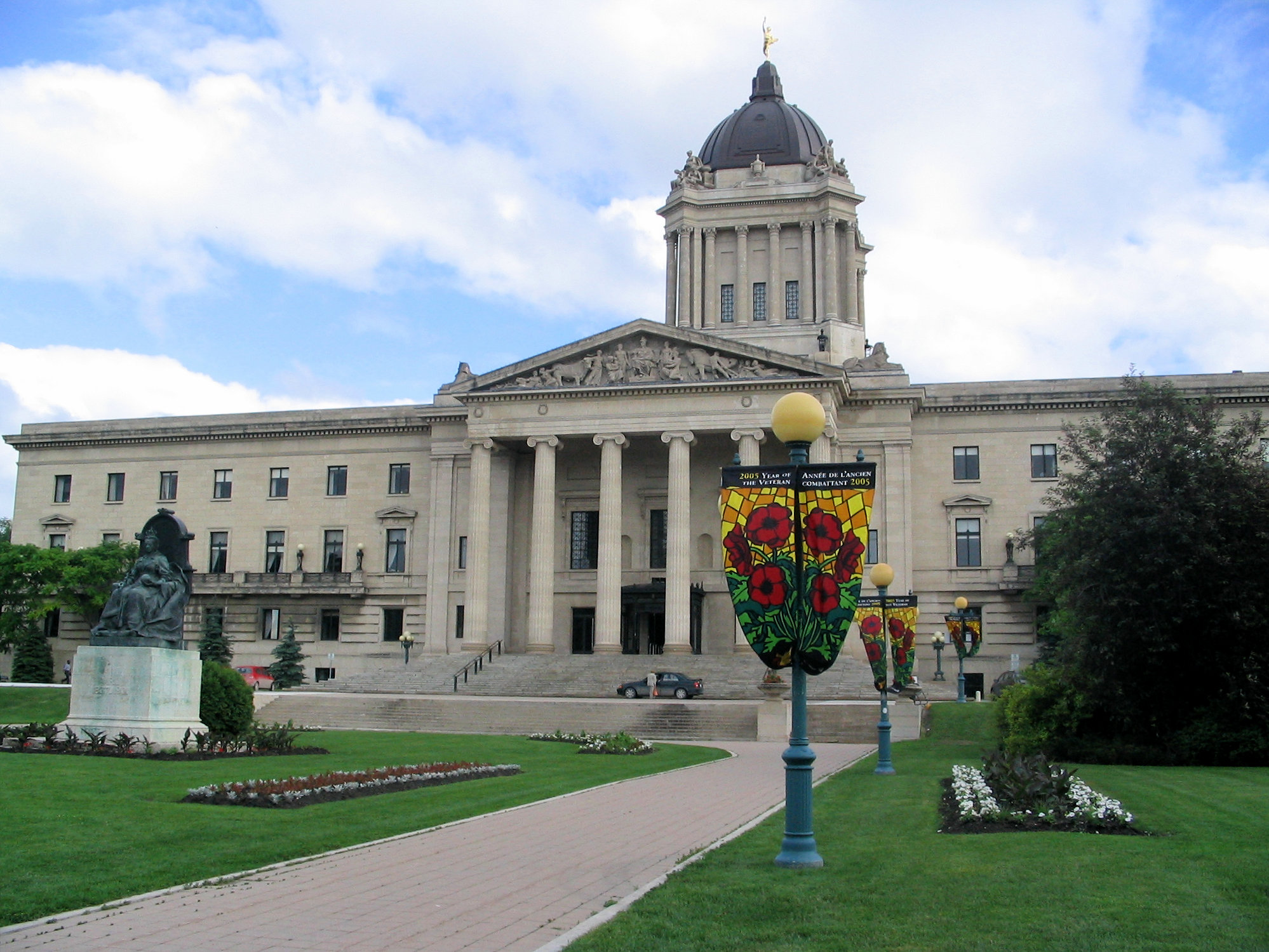

Legislative Assembly of Manitoba
- Citation: C.C.S.M. c. J35 [PDF]
- Territorial extent: Manitoba
- Enacted by: RSM 1987, c. A170
- Commenced: Feb 1, 1988

Amends
- The Attorney General's Act, C.C.S.M. c. A170

Amended by
- SM 2017, c. 14
- Status: Amended

Designating authority to the Department, the 1885 Attorney General's Act would be renamed to the Department of Justice Act in 1987. Accordingly, the Department was reorganized in 1989 and—hoping to reflect its broadened influence in provincial government and justice system—became the Department of Justice.

In 1997, the responsibilities of Manitoba Justice were expanded to include administration of the Justice Initiatives Fund (formerly the Aboriginal Justice Fund), a program designed to fund initiatives that support the Department's goals. In 2016, the department took responsibility over crime prevention (transferred from the Children and Youth Opportunities department) and consumer protection (transferred from the Department of Tourism, Culture, Heritage, Sport and Consumer Protection).

=== Statutes ===
In Manitoba, an Act (or statute) is a law enacted by the Legislative Assembly of Manitoba. A consolidated Act is one that has been updated to incorporate amendments into its original text, with continuing application as amended. Moreover, in Manitoba, consolidated Acts are grouped into three subcategories:

- The Continuing Consolidation of the Statutes of Manitoba (C.C.S.M.) is a set of Manitoba public Acts that have a general, rather than particular, application.
- Municipal Acts are public Acts that are applicable to particular municipalities.
- Private Acts are those that have no general application. Instead, they confer "special rights or exemptions on specific individuals or groups."

On behalf of the province, Manitoba's Department of Justice administers and enforces more than 100 provincial statutes relating to civil law, correctional services, and court administration, among others. Consolidated Acts that Manitoba Justice has been responsible for include, among others, The Human Rights Code (1987–88); The Liquor, Gaming and Cannabis Control Act (2013), formerly The Liquor Control Act; The Child Custody Enforcement Act (1987); The Justice for Victims of Child Pornography Act (2011); The Manitoba Public Insurance Corporation Act; and The Victims' Bill of Rights (1998), formerly The Victims' Rights Act.

Under the Canadian Constitution Act, 1867, Manitoba Justice is also responsible for prosecuting cases under the Criminal Code and the Youth Criminal Justice Act.

== Courts Division ==
The Courts Division of the Department facilitates court services throughout Manitoba and is overseen by Assistant Deputy Minister Suzanne Gervais (2019/20). The three courts of Manitoba are:

1. Manitoba Court of Appeal;
2. the Court of Queen's Bench of Manitoba; and
3. the Provincial Court of Manitoba

== Criminal Justice Division ==
The Criminal Justice Division provides police protection for all parts of Manitoba, working closely with municipal and Indigenous police as well as the RCMP.

=== Law Enforcement Review Agency ===
Law Enforcement Review Agency
Agency overview
- Formed: February 1, 1985
- Headquarters: 420 - 155 Carlton Street, Winnipeg, MB
- Employees: 7
- Annual budget: $655,000 CAD
- Minister responsible: Minister of Justice; Asst. Deputy Minister of Criminal Justice
- Agency executive: Andrew Minor, Commissioner (appointed by Order in Council)
- Parent department: Manitoba Justice
- Key document: The Law Enforcement Review Act
- Website: gov.mb.ca/justice/lera/index.html

The Law Enforcement Review Agency (LERA) is an arm's-length, non-police body of the Criminal Justice Division that, under the authority of The Law Enforcement Review Act (TLERA), investigates public complaints against members of local/municipal police forces in Manitoba—particularly, abuses of authority by on-duty officers. LERA is located in Winnipeg and its current staff consists of the Commissioner, a registrar/administrative officer, a clerk, and 4 investigators.

The Commissioner reports operationally to the Minister of Justice via annual report, as a legislative requirement, and administratively to the Assistant Deputy Minister of Criminal Justice. As of 2020, LERA has statutory jurisdiction over (approx.) 1,664 peace officers that are employed by municipal police departments in Manitoba

Originally, the responsibility of dealing with citizen complaints in Manitoba was handled by local police commissions, composed of some or all members of their respective municipal councils. However, Manitoba Police Commission (MPC)—which was established to provide consultation to municipal police and oversee their operations—would every so often receive complaints that had been inadequately addressed at the local level, and would have to get involved. In 1979, following MPC's investigation of an incident from 1976 that involved the (alleged) beating of a rape suspect by Winnipeg police officers, the Commission recommended a change in public complaint procedures. In March 1981, the Department of the Attorney General proposed for new legislation and, in November 1982, The Law Enforcement Review Act (Bill 2, 32nd Legislature) was introduced into the House. The Bill would pass in August 1983 and would be proclaimed in December 1984. This new law would require that all public complaints regarding the actions of an on-duty police officer be referred to the Commissioner who accesses it according to the Act.

LERA would finally begin operations as an agency on 1 February 1985. In 1988, the Attorney General initiated an evaluation of LERA and the consideration of consolidating LERA and MPC into a single agency dealing with police complaints in order to make use of available resources. In 1992, TLERA was amended, which included the establishment of the Law Enforcement Review Board (LERB); the MPC being dissolved; requiring the burden of proof; and more authority to the Commissioner to resolve complaints.

== Crown Law Division ==
Civil Justice (or Crown Law), overseen by Assistant Deputy AG Mike Mahon (2019/20), is the division of Manitoba Justice that consists of the following branches and agencies:

- Civil Legal Services are the internal law firm to the Government of Manitoba, providing legal services to all provincial government entities that do not have legal counsel of their own.
- The Family Law branch is tasked with providing government departments with legal services and advice regarding family law. They help government develop family law policy, programs and legislative initiatives. They also work to increase awareness of family law initiatives and issues among the general public and the legal profession.
  - Family Law Manitoba, or the Family Justice Resource Centre, is a service that directs people to relevant services regarding matters of family law, as well as providing other, crucial information.
- The Constitutional Law branch is there to provides the provincial government with legal services regarding constitutional matters. This branch was formed as the Department began to expand its responsibilities, addressing issues related to the interpretation of the Canadian Charter of Rights and Freedoms, which was enacted in 1982.
- The Office of the Chief Medical Examiner is there for situations that involve risk to human life. The Chief Medical Examiner (CME) of Manitoba investigates all "unexpected, unexplained, suspicious, violent and children's deaths" in the province.
- The Manitoba Human Rights Commission (MHRC) is an independent Manitoba agency that operates under Manitoba's Human Rights Code, working towards reducing "unreasonable discrimination" for Manitobans.
- The Manitoba Law Reform Commission
- Legal Aid Manitoba

=== Legal Aid Manitoba ===
Legal Aid Manitoba
- Aide juridique Manitoba

Agency overview
- Formed: 1971
- Employees: approx. 190 (2020)
- Annual budget: $37 m CAD (2019/20)
- Agency executives: Allan Fineblit, Management Council Chair; Irene Hamilton, Advisory Committee Chair
- Parent department: Manitoba Justice
- Key document: The Legal Aid Manitoba Act
- Website: legalaid.mb.ca

Legal Aid Manitoba (LAM; French: Aide juridique Manitoba) is an independent agency, established by The Legal Aid Manitoba Act, that provides legal services in Manitoba to those who may require legal aid.

LAM receives funding from the Province of Manitoba, Government of Canada, and Manitoba Law Foundation, as well as client fees. Legal Aid Manitoba currently has offices in Winnipeg, Brandon, Dauphin, The Pas, and Thompson, with its personnel (including contracted private lawyers) regularly travelling to over 40 rural and northern communities. Approximately 190 provincial employees work with LAM, formally or informally, serving (approx.) 90,000 Manitobans per year.

For cases that affect groups of people (e.g., those involving human rights, environmental law, consumer law, poverty law), LAM funds and oversees its provision of services through the Public Interest Law Centre (PILC). PILC receives additional funding support from the Manitoba Law Foundation, as well as pro bono public interest legal services, in-kind services, client contributions, and occasional project grants.

In the 1930s–40s, the Law Society of Manitoba established the first program in Canada to provide free aid for those who could not afford legal counsel. Lawyers would work pro bono. In 1969, with growing demand for free legal aid, a roster of private bar lawyers were paid $50 daily to act as duty counsel at criminal intake court. In 1971–72, Manitoba would finally incorporate legal aid into provincial legislation in 1971 and, in 1972, Legal Aid Services Society of Manitoba would begin operations. A decade later, with the advent of the Canadian Charter of Rights and Freedoms in 1982, LAM would establish the Public Interest Law Centre to handle cases of social significance, i.e. cases that affect groups/Manitobans broadly.

In 2005, the organization formally changed its name to "Legal Aid Manitoba," and its board of directors was replaced by a management council with a chair and vice-chair appointed by the Lieutenant Governor in Council.

=== Manitoba Law Reform Commission ===
The Manitoba Law Reform Commission (MLRC) is an arm's-length agency, established in 1970 by The Law Reform Commission Act, that reviews and recommends reforms regarding "modernizing and improving provincial laws."

Consisting of 5 to 7 members appointed by the Lieutenant Governor in Council, the Commission's membership is required to include a judge of the Court of Queen's Bench; a full-time student of the UManitoba Faculty of Law; "a lawyer entitled to practise in Manitoba and not in the employ of the government; and a non-lawyer." One of the members is appointed President of the Commission, and must be a lawyer.

== Community Safety Division ==
The largest division of Manitoba Justice is the Community Safety Division, which "administers sentences imposed by the courts on offenders who are in custody or on probation." The Division was overseen by Associate Deputy Minister Scott Kolody during the 2019/20 fiscal year.

This Division provides various services through its branches/units:

- Corrections, as well as probation services and conditional sentences—i.e., supervising those in the community who are on probation, bail, or "otherwise following court orders."
  - Manitoba Corrections consists of 6 adult and 2 youth correctional facilities throughout Manitoba.
- Provincial policing, with the responsibility of facilitating the provision of police services throughout the province
  - The Community Notification Advisory Committee (CNAC) is an advisory body that, after reviewing each case, advises police on whether the public should be notified about those living in the community who are convicted sexual offenders labelled as high-risk of re-offending. As a joint initiative with Brandon Police Service, Correctional Services of Canada, RCMP, and Winnipeg Police Service, this program is the first of its kind in all of Canada.
  - The Manitoba Police Commission
- Protective services, which provide security services and other governmental oversight
  - The Independent Investigation Unit, which began operations on 19 June 2015 under of Part VII of The Police Services Act, is responsible for conducting investigations when an officer has been involved in an incident where someone has died or suffered a serious injury, or when there is evidence that an officer has violated prescribed legislation.

Relevant legislation includes The Safer Communities and Neighbourhoods Act, The Body Armour and Fortified Vehicle Control Act, and The Parental Responsibility Act.

The Division also oversees the Vehicle Impoundment Registry (VIR), the administrative centre that—under the Highway Traffic Act—administers the seizures and impoundments of vehicles, which includes recording the status of every vehicle seized in Manitoba.

=== Manitoba Police Commission ===
The Manitoba Police Commission (MPC) provides advice to the Justice Minister on regulations that deal with police operations and conduct. The current Commission was established on 15 November 2010, as per section 6 of Manitoba's Police Services Act, (Note: Police Services Act.) and is also a member of the Manitoba Association of Chiefs of Police, the Canadian Association of Police Governance, and the Canadian Association of Civilian Oversight of Law Enforcement.

The Commission is currently chaired by David Asper.

All police boards and commissions in Manitoba are required by law to submit an annual report to the MRC. There are 10 municipal police boards and 1 First Nation police commission in Manitoba:

- Altona Police Board (Altona Police Service)
- Brandon Police Board (Brandon Police Service)
- Cornwallis Police Board (Cornwallis Police Service)
- Dakota Ojibway Tribal Council Police Commission (Manitoba First Nation Police Service)
- Morden Police Board (Morden Police Service)
- Riverdale Police Board (Rivers Police Service)
- Springfield Police Board (Springfield Police Service)
- Ste. Anne Police Board (Ste. Anne Police Service)
- Victoria Beach Police Board (Victoria Beach Police Service)
- Winkler Police Board (Winkler Police Service)
- Winnipeg Police Board (Winnipeg Police Service)

=== Manitoba Corrections ===
Manitoba Corrections (or the Corrections Division) has its head office located on 810 - 405 Broadway in Winnipeg. It includes 6 adult correctional services; 2 youth correctional services, which provide custody and various programs for young people charged with offences and/or sentenced to custody under the federal Youth Criminal Justice Act; and 27 community corrections offices (incl. 11 in First Nations communities), which provide all "non-custody, community-based offender services and programs."

Manitoba Corrections centres
Adult correctional centres
Name	Location	Security	Rated capacity (Note: See: Rated capacity) (adult)	Note
Brandon Correctional Centre	375 Veterans Way, Brandon	medium	244 males	Short-term holding for young offenders and 8 adult females is also provided for western Manitoba.
Headingley Correctional Institution	6030 Portage Avenue, MB Highway 1	minimum, medium, and maximum	549 males	
Milner Ridge Correctional Centre	Agassiz Provincial Forest, Beausejour	minimum, medium, and maximum	524 males	Located ~20 km (12 mi) southwest of Lac du Bonnet.
The Pas Correctional Centre	Next to the provincial court building in The Pas.	minimum, medium, and maximum	110 males, 4 females	Includes temporary holding unit for young offenders
Winnipeg Remand Centre	141 Kennedy St., downtown Winnipeg	minimum, medium, and maximum	281 males, 8 females	This is a pre-trial detention, i.e. remand, centre for adults, housing people who are waiting for court decisions on their charges or placement in correctional centres.
Women's Correctional Centre	31 Routledge Ave., Headingley	"multi-level"	196 females	This Centre was completed and opened in early 2012.
Youth correctional centres
Name	Location	Rated capacity (youth)		Note
Agassiz Youth Centre (AYC)	59 acres, Portage la Prairie	128 males		Within the centre is a high-security special-handling unit called Lakewood.
Manitoba Youth Centre (MYC)	170 Doncaster St., Winnipeg	105 males, 45 females		The largest youth correctional centre in Manitoba.

Community corrections offices
Winnipeg community
Type	Name	Location
Adult	Family Violence Unit	2031 Portage Ave
Adult	Family Violence Unit	470 Notre Dame Ave
Adult	Intake & Records	435 - 405 Broadway
Adult	Probation Program Unit	225 Garry St
Adult	Probation Services – Bail Supervision	10 Midland St
Adult	Random Assault Unit	225 Garry St
Adult	Restorative Resolutions Program	583 Ellice Ave
Youth	Youth Community Corrections Office	77A Redwood Ave
Youth	Youth Community Corrections Office	533 Notre Dame Ave
Rural community (adult & youth)
Name		Location
Centralized First Nations Unit		172 Doncaster St., Winnipeg
Eastman Region		20 First St., Beausejour
Interlake Region		337A Main St., Selkirk
Norman Region		Otineka Mall, The Pas
Parkland Region		Swan River
Thompson Region		59 Elizabeth Drive Rd, Thompson
Westman Region		340 9th Street, Brandon

== Minister and Attorney General ==
Minister of Justice and Attorney General
- Ministre de la Justice et procureure générale
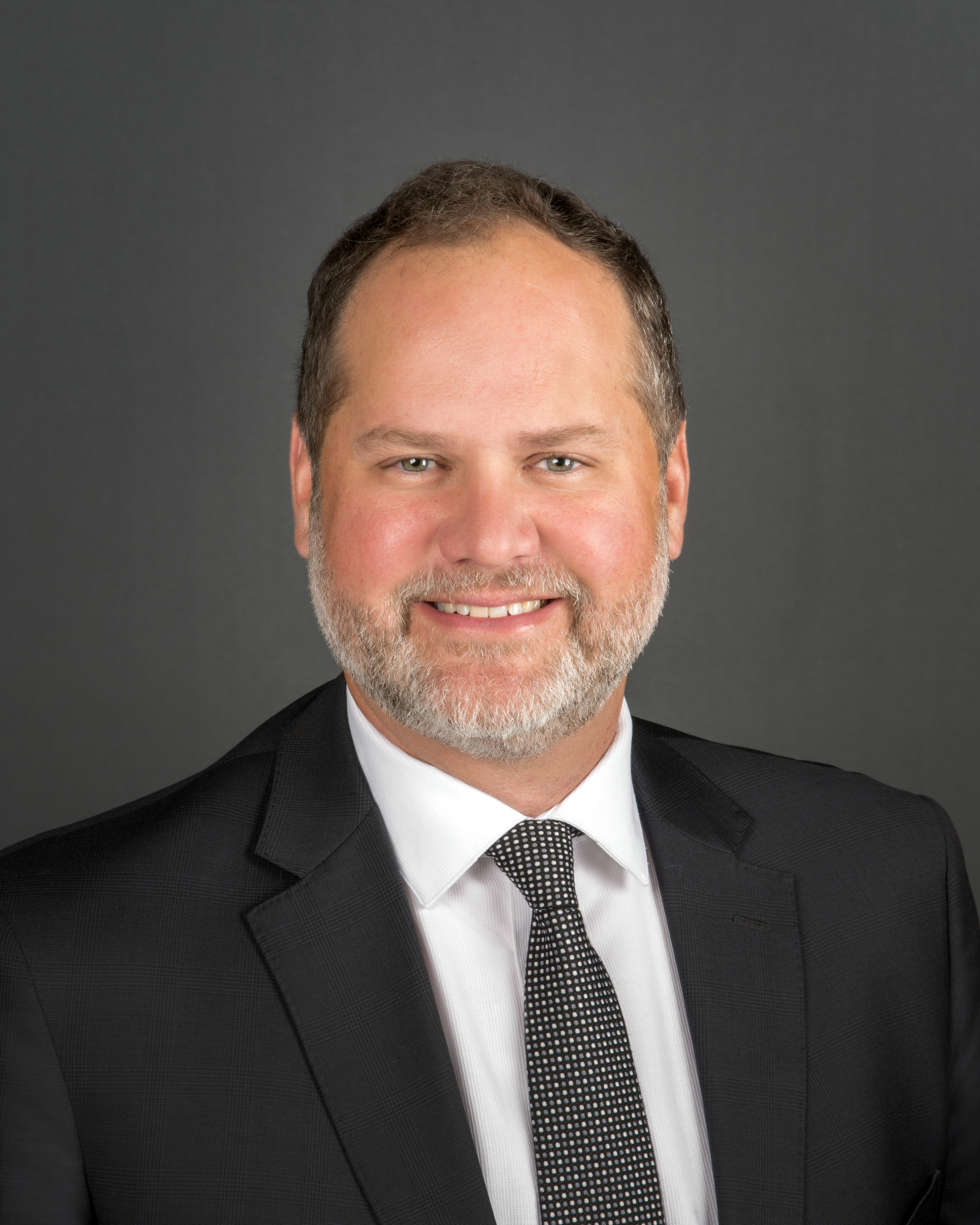
- Incumbent; Matt Wiebe since October 18, 2023
- Member of: Legislative Assembly; Executive Council
- Constituting instrument: The Department of Justice Act
- Precursor: Attorney General
- Formation: 1990

The Minister of Justice and Attorney General (French: Ministre de la Justice et procureur général) is a cabinet minister in the Government of Manitoba. The minister who holds this office is typically also designated as Keeper of the Great Seal of the Province of Manitoba (French: Gardien du Grand Sceau de la province du Manitoba). The current Minister of Justice and Attorney General is Matt Wiebe.

The role of Minister of Justice did not exist in Manitoba prior to 1990, when the designation of Attorney General (AG) was changed to 'Minister of Justice and Attorney General' midway through then-AG James McCrae's time in office. Thereafter, as of September 1990, Manitoba's Minister of Justice has been ex officio the Attorney General for Manitoba.

=== 1871–1990 ===
Manitoba Attorneys General
Minister	Party	Start of term	End of term	Concurrent positions held
Henry Joseph Clarke	N/A	January 13, 1871	July 8, 1874	Premier of Manitoba (Mar 14, 1872 – Jul 8, 1874)
John Donald Cameron	Liberal	November 17, 1896	January 6, 1900	Minister of Municipal Affairs (since Jan 13, 1893)
Joseph Dubuc	Cons.	July 8, 1874	December 2, 1874	
Joseph Royal	Cons.	May 11, 1876	October 16, 1878	Provincial Secretary
David M. Walker	Lib-Cons.	October 16, 1878	July 5, 1882	
Alexander MacBeth Sutherland	Cons.	September 2, 1882	September 3, 1883	
James Andrews Miller	Cons.	September 6, 1883	December 4, 1884	
Charles Edward Hamilton	Cons.	February 4, 1885	December 24, 1887	
Charles Edward Hamilton	Cons.	December 26, 1887	January 18, 1888	
Joseph Martin	Liberal	January 18, 1888	April 22, 1891	Provincial Lands Commissioner/Railway Commissioner (Jan 20, 1888)
Clifford Sifton	Liberal	May 14, 1891	November 17, 1896	Provincial Lands Commissioner (May 15, 1891 – Oct 7, 1896)
John Donald Cameron	Liberal	November 17, 1896	January 6, 1900	
Hugh John Macdonald	Cons.	January 6, 1900	October 9, 1900	Premier of Manitoba; Municipal Commissioner; Railway Commissioner; President of the Council (since Jan 6, 1900)
Colin H. K. C. Campbell	Cons.	October 9, 1900	October 11, 1911	Municipal Commissioner (Oct 29, 1900 – Dec 20, 1900)
James Henry Howden	Cons.	October 11, 1911	May 12, 1915	
Albert Bellock Hudson	Liberal	May 12, 1915	November 10, 1917	Minister of Telephones and Telegraphs
Thomas H. Johnson	Liberal	November 10, 1917	June 6, 1922	Minister of Telephones and Telegraphs
Robert Jacob	Liberal	June 6, 1922	August 8, 1922	
Richard Craig	UFM	August 8, 1922	August 29, 1927	Minister of Telephones and Telegraphs (Jan 12, 1925 – Apr 29, 1927)
William James Major	Prog.	August 29, 1927	February 22, 1929	
William James Major	Prog.	May 18, 1929	April 1, 1941	
James McLenaghen	PC	May 3, 1941	June 23, 1950	Minister of Health (May 4, 1940 – Feb 5, 1944); Minister of Labour (Feb 5, 1944 – Feb 14, 1946)
Charles Rhodes Smith	Lib-Prog	August 16, 1950	November 7, 1952	
Ivan Schultz	Lib-Prog	November 7, 1952	January 25, 1955	
Michael Nicholas Hryhorczuk	Lib-Prog	January 25, 1955	June 30, 1958	
Sterling Lyon	PC	June 30, 1958	December 9, 1963	Minister of Municipal Affairs (Sept 30, 1960 – Oct 25, 1961); Minister of Public Utilities (Oct 31, 1961 – Jun 12, 1963)
Stewart McLean	PC	December 9, 1963	July 22, 1966	
Sterling Lyon	PC	July 22, 1966	July 15, 1969	Minister of Tourism and Recreation Commission, Northern Affairs (till Sept 24, 1968)
Alvin Mackling	NDP	July 15, 1969	September 4, 1973	
Howard Pawley	NDP	September 4, 1973	October 24, 1977	Minister of Municipal Affairs (Jul 15, 1969 – Sept 22, 1976); Minister responsible for the Liquor Control Act (Sept 22, 1976)
Gerald Mercier	PC	October 24, 1977	November 17, 1981	
Roland Penner	NDP	November 17, 1981	September 21, 1987	Government House Leader (Nov 30, 1981 – Nov 4, 1983); Chairman of Treasury Board (Nov 30, 1981 – Jul 28, 1982); Minister for the Liquor Control Act (Mar 4, 1982); Minister of Consumer and Corporate Affairs (Nov 4, 1983 – Apr 17, 1986); Minister for Constitutional Affairs (Apr 17, 1986)
Victor (Vic) Schroeder	NDP	September 21, 1987	May 9, 1988	Minister responsible for Manitoba Development Corporation (since Feb 4, 1987)
James McCrae	PC	May 9, 1988	September 1990	Until April 21, 1989: Minister of Consumer and Corporate Affairs; Minister of Co-operative Development; Minister responsible for Constitutional Affairs; Minister for the Liquor Control Act

=== 1990–present ===
Manitoba Ministers of Justice and Attorneys General
Minister	Party	Start of term	End of term	Concurrent positions held
James McCrae	PC	September 1990	September 10, 1993	Minister responsible for Constitutional Affairs; Minister responsible for Liquor Control Act
Rosemary Vodrey	PC	September 10, 1993	January 6, 1997	Minister responsible for the Status of Women; Minister responsible for Constitutional Affairs
Vic Toews	PC	January 6, 1997	October 5, 1999	Minister responsible for Constitutional Affairs
Gord Mackintosh	NDP	October 5, 1999	September 21, 2006	Minister responsible for Constitutional Affairs; Government House Leader; Minister for The Manitoba Public Insurance Corporation Act (from Jan 17, 2001)
David Chomiak	NDP	September 21, 2006	November 3, 2009	Government House Leader
Andrew Swan	NDP	November 3, 2009	November 3, 2014	Minister responsible for Constitutional Affairs; Minister for The MPI Corporation Act
James Allum	NDP	November 3, 2014	April 29, 2015	Minister responsible for Constitutional Affairs; Minister for The MPI Corporation Act
Gord Mackintosh	NDP	April 29, 2015	May 3, 2016	Minister responsible for Constitutional Affairs; Minister for The MPI Corporation Act
Heather Stefanson	PC	May 3, 2016	August 1, 2018	
Cliff Cullen	PC	August 1, 2018	January 5, 2021	
Cameron Friesen	PC	January 5, 2021	January 18, 2022	
Kelvin Goertzen	PC	January 18, 2022	October 18, 2023	Minister Responsible for Manitoba Public Insurance (MPI)
Matt Wiebe	NDP	October 18, 2023	Incumbent	Minister Responsible for Manitoba Public Insurance (MPI)

== See also ==
Crime and justice in Manitoba

- Aboriginal Justice Implementation Commission
- Court of Queen's Bench of Manitoba
- Independent Investigation Unit
- Law, government, and crime in Winnipeg
  - Winnipeg Police Service
- Manitoba Court of Appeal
- Manitoba Human Rights Commission
- Manitoba Law School
- Manitoba Queen's Printer
- Provincial Court of Manitoba
- RCMP "D" Division

Crime and justice in Canada

- Department of Justice (Canada)
- Correctional Service of Canada
  - Regional Reception Centre
- Crime in Canada
  - List of Canadian provinces and territories by homicide rate
- Royal Canadian Mounted Police
  - Civilian Review and Complaints Commission for the RCMP
