= Comprehensive Ontario Police Services Act, 2019 =

Ontario, Canada statute

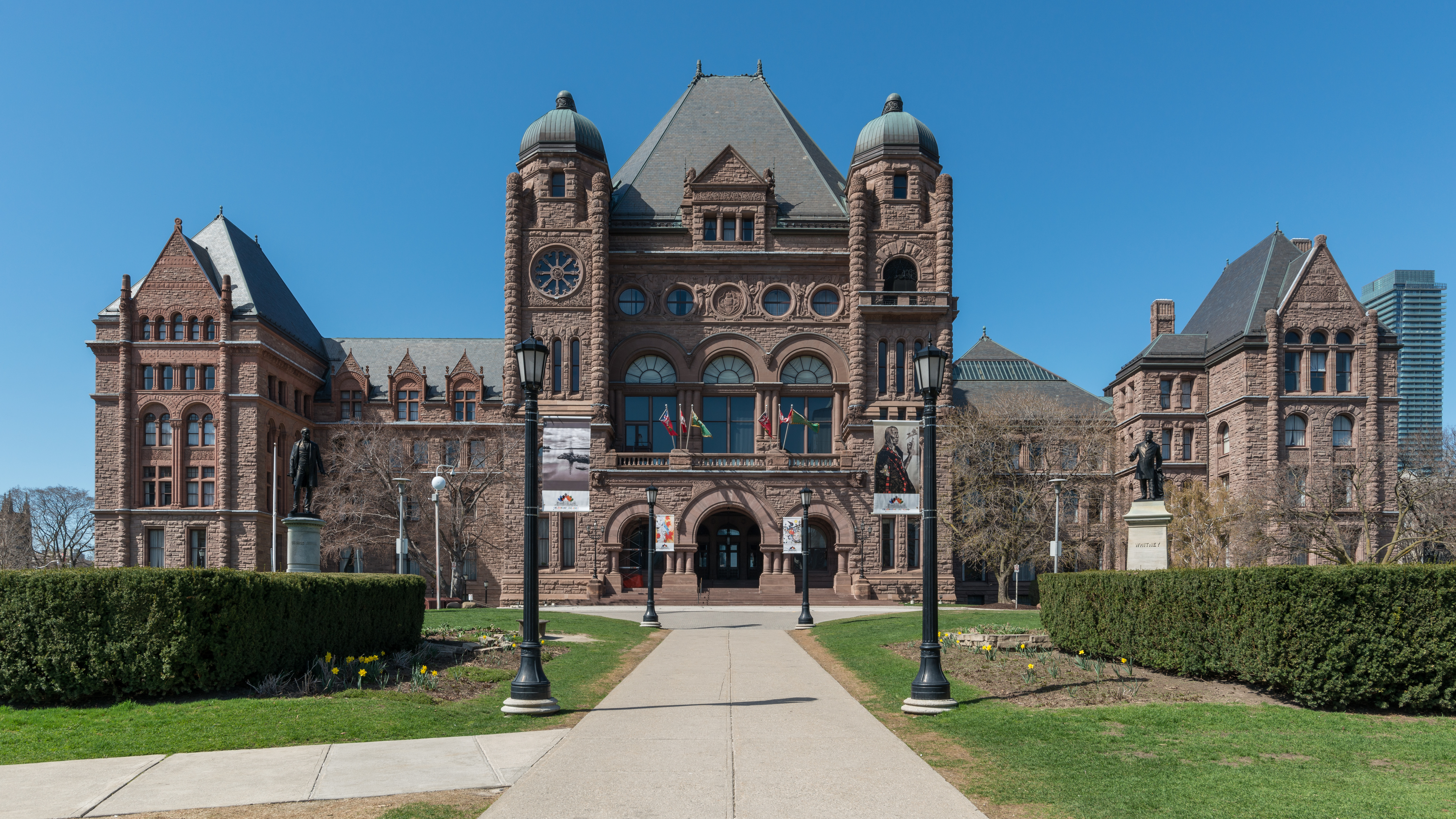

Legislative Assembly of Ontario
- Long title: An Act with respect to community safety and policing
- Citation: S.O. 2019, c. 1
- Royal assent: 26 March 2019

Legislative history
- Bill citation: Bill 68
- Introduced by: Sylvia Jones MLA, Minister of Community Safety and Correctional Services
- First reading: 19 February 2019
- Second reading: 28 February 2019
- Third reading: 26 March 2019
- Status: Current legislation

The Comprehensive Ontario Police Services Act (Bill 68, 2019; French: Loi de 2019 sur la refonte complète des services de police de l'Ontario) is a law in the province of Ontario, Canada that brought a number of reforms to policing in the province.

== Background ==
In 2018, the Government of Ontario, then led by the Ontario Liberal Party and Premier Kathleen Wynne, had introduced a number of police reforms in the Safer Ontario Act, 2018 (Bill 175). After the 2018 Ontario general election, however, the new Progressive Conservative-led government under Premier Doug Ford decried the legislation, with MPP Sylvia Jones stating that it was "the most anti-police legislation in Canadian history. It was a disaster."

== Summary ==
The bill brought a number of changes to policing in Ontario, including:

- Removing court security and the enforcement of municipal bylaws from the definition of adequate and effective policing
- Requiring every municipal police service board to write a diversity plan for board appointments and requiring board members to undergo human rights and diversity training
- Allowing municipal police service boards to increase their numbers from five members to seven or nine
- Requiring police record checks for municipal police service board appointees
- Amendments to the division of responsibilities between municipal police service boards and chiefs of police
- Requiring municipal police service boards to publish orders given to chiefs of police
- Allowing chiefs of police to extend the probationary period for officers by an additional six months
- New regulations for special constables
- Creating the Inspector General of Policing agency
- Re-organising the Independent Police Review Director into the Law Enforcement Complaints Agency
- Amending regulations around reporting of misconduct and to police officer disciplinary procedures
- Introducing the possibility of suspension without pay for police officers
- Allowing members of police associations to sue the association if they feel that it did not fairly represent them

== Legislative history ==
The bill was introduced to the Legislative Assembly of Ontario by Progressive Conservative MPP for Dufferin—Caledon and Solicitor General of Ontario Sylvia Jones in mid-February 2019.

From 7 March to 21 March 2019, the bill was reviewed by the Standing Committee on Justice Policy.

On 26 March 2019, the final vote on the bill was held, with 70 MPPs voting in favour and 31 voting against. It received royal assent from Lieutenant-Governor Elizabeth Dowdeswell that same day.

== Reactions ==
The Ontario Human Rights Commission stated that mistrust of police by marginalised communities was a significant issue in the province and that the bill "includes many features that can help Ontario move towards a modern vision of equitable policing." However, the Commission also argued that additional features were needed, including requiring police agencies to establish permanent collection of human rights data and ensuring that investigations into police misconduct were handled by a fully independent body.

The Canadian Civil Liberties Association opposed the bill, with executive director Michael Bryant stating that "the government has gutted police oversight, scrapped the police complaints commission, and really set the clock back on accountability and transparency of policing."

== Legacy ==
In October 2020, Devon Clunis was chosen to lead the new Inspector General of Policing agency. He had previously served as chief of the Winnipeg Police Service from 2012 until his retirement in 2016.
