= Manitoba Human Rights Commission =

Government agency in Manitoba, Canada

Agency overview
- Jurisdiction: Government of Manitoba
- Headquarters: Winnipeg, Manitoba
- Employees: 21.0 FTE (2009-2010)
- Annual budget: CAD$1.6 million (2023-2024)
- Minister responsible: Matt Wiebe, Minister of Justice and Attorney General
- Agency executives: John Burchill, Chairperson; Karen Sharma, Executive Director
- Website: www.manitobahumanrights.ca

The Manitoba Human Rights Commission (MHRC) is a quasi-judicial arms-length agency of the Government of Manitoba that is responsible for enforcing The Human Rights Code (Manitoba).

The acting chairperson of the Board of Commissioners is John Burchill, who is chief of staff for the Winnipeg Police Service.

== Board of Commissioners ==
As of May 2026, the Board of Commissioners include:

- John Burchill (Chairperson) expiring May 5, 2029.
- Michael Reader (Vice Chairperson) expiring May 5, 2028.
- Daphne Comegan (Member) expiring May 5, 2029.
- Humaira Jaleel (Member) expiring May 5, 2027.
- Cecil Sveinson (Member) expiring May 5, 2027.
- David Kron (Member) expiring May 5, 2028.
- Matthew Haydey (Member) expiring May 5, 2027.
- Angie Conrad (Member) expiring May 5, 2028.

As of December 2021, the Board of Commissioners includes:

- John Burchill (acting chairperson) — chief of staff for the Winnipeg Police Service.
- Loretta Ross — a lawyer and the Treaty Relations Commissioner of Manitoba.
- Jeannette Acheson — a parole officer for the Correctional Service of Canada, the Vice Chair of the Manitoba Police Commission, and a trustee for the Canadian Museum for Human Rights.
- Michael Reader — the Director of Capital Management for the Northern Regional Health Authority.
- Ian Grant — former Chief of Police with the City of Brandon-Brandon Police Service, a special advisor for Public Safety programs at Assiniboine Community College.
- Tracy Leipsic — a speed skating coach with the River Heights Speed Skating Club, and the Vice President (Finance) of the Manitoba Speed Skating Association.
- Darcy Strutinsky — a member of the Manitoba Labour Board and the Labour Management Review Committee, and with the Children’s Hospital Foundation of Manitoba.

== Backlog ==
A 2020 report from the Manitoba Ombudsman revealed that wait times for assignment to an investigator had increased from 4 months in 2012 to 23 months in 2017. As of March 2025, the Manitoba Human Rights Commission reports the wait time is currently 22 months.

Annual Reporting of Preliminary Assessment Statistics
Year	Number of complaints assessed for dismissal without investigation	Complaints dismissed without investigation	Percentage of complaints dismissed
2025	n/a	n/a	n/a
2024	40	39	98%
2023	98	96	98%
2022	133	132	99%
