= John Donald Cameron =

Canadian politician (1858–1923)

John Donald Cameron (September 18, 1858 – March 26, 1923) was a lawyer, judge and political figure in Manitoba. He represented Winnipeg South from 1892 to 1899 in the Legislative Assembly of Manitoba as a Liberal.

He was born on a farm in East Nissouri, Oxford County, Canada West, the son of John Cameron, and was educated in Woodstock, at the Canadian Literary Institute (later Woodstock College) and at the University of Toronto. Cameron was called to the Ontario bar in 1882. He came to Manitoba later that year, settling in Winnipeg. He was first elected to the provincial assembly in an 1892 by-election held after Isaac Campbell ran for a federal seat. Cameron served in the Manitoba cabinet as Provincial Secretary, as Municipal Commissioner and as Attorney General. In 1908, he was named to the Manitoba Court of King's Bench and, in 1909, to the Manitoba Court of Appeal.

Cameron died in St. Paul, Minnesota.
