= Hamilton's Stores (Yellowstone National Park) =

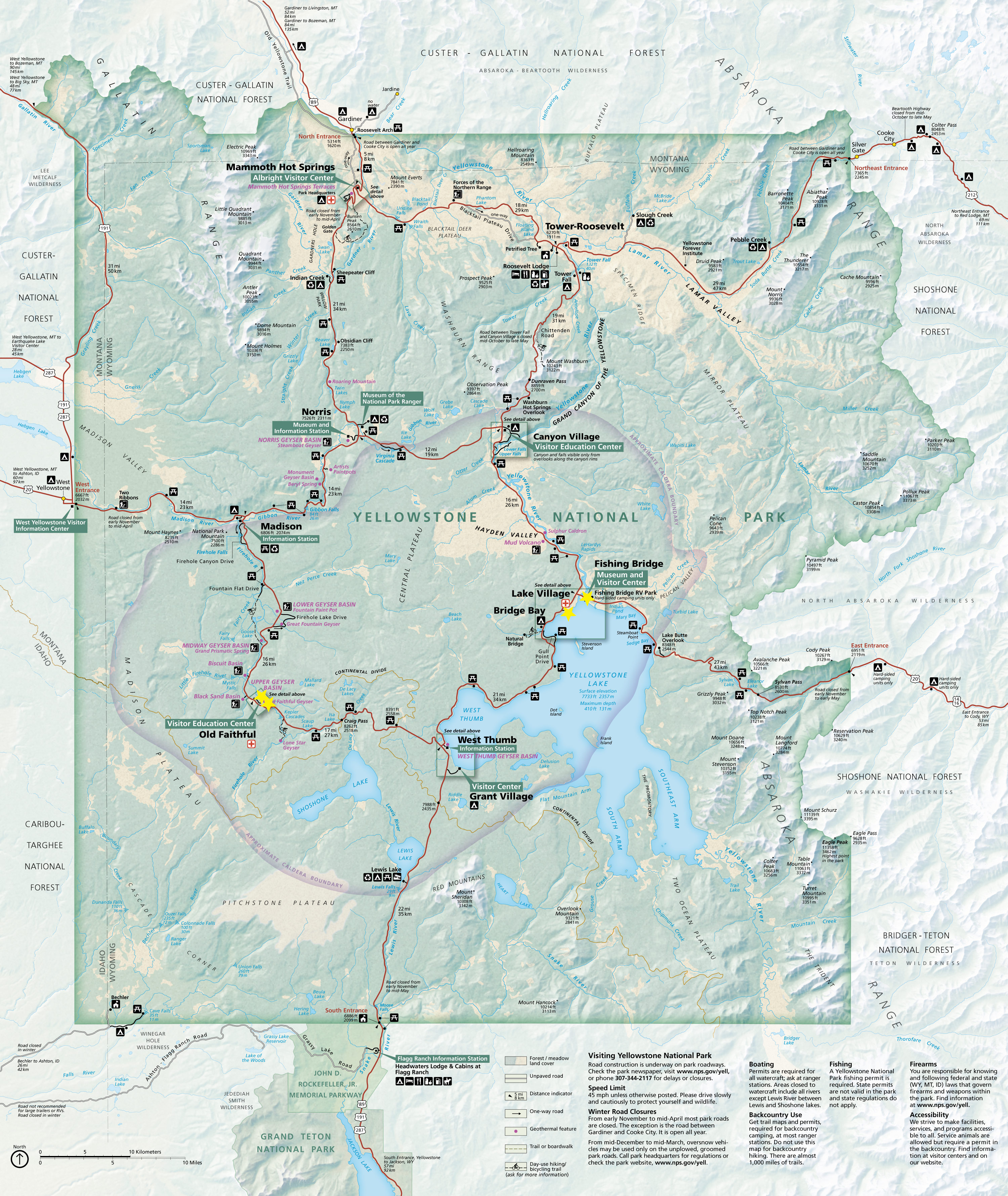
- Historic Hamilton store locations
- Industry: Retail
- Founded: 1915; 110 years ago
- Founder: Charles Hamilton
- Defunct: 2002
- Fate: Ceased operations

Hamilton's Stores were concessioners in Yellowstone National Park from 1915 to 2002. The stores were founded by Winnipeg native Charles Hamilton, who arrived in Yellowstone in 1905, aged 21, to work for the Yellowstone Park Association. The stores provided tourists with food, souvenirs, and sundries at the major attractions along Yellowstone's Grand Loop Road. Several buildings constructed for Hamilton are significant examples of the National Park Service Rustic style of architecture and have assumed prominence as attractions in their own right. Most are included as contributing structures in National Register of Historic Places historic districts.

== Charles Hamilton ==
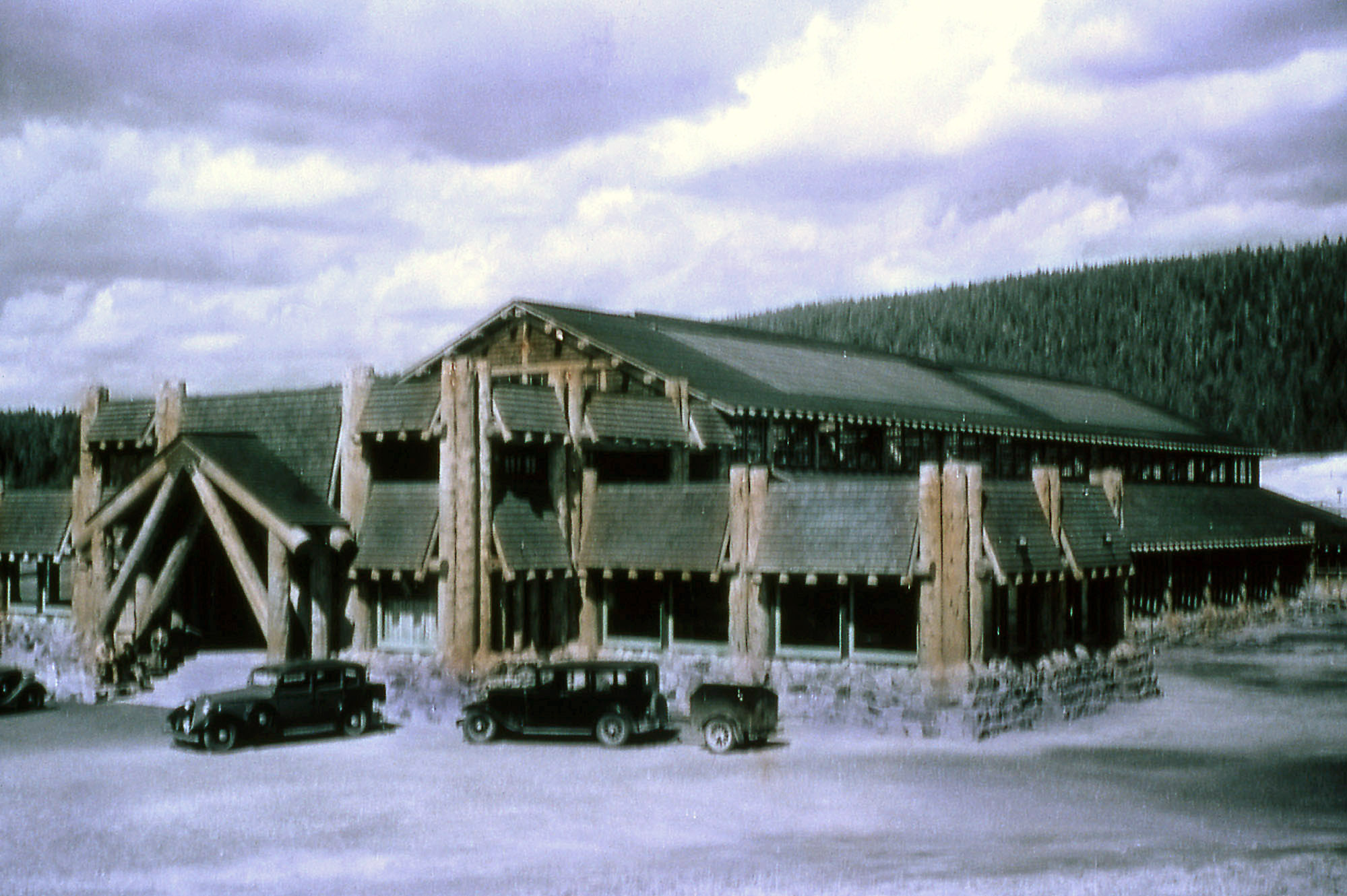
Swimming pool at Old Faithful operated by Hamilton

Charles Ashworth Hamilton was born in Winnipeg on November 19, 1884. His parents were Alma Lizzie Ashworth Hamilton and Charles Edward Hamilton. Alma was from Ottawa, C.E., a lawyer, and was an immigrant from Kent, England. At the time of their son's birth, C.E. was mayor of Winnipeg and attorney general of Manitoba. The family moved to Saint Paul, Minnesota in 1884, where the elder Charles had been appointed British Vice-Consul for Minnesota. After attending high school in Saint Paul, the younger Charles enrolled in a business school. This training helped him obtain a summer job in 1905 as an assistant to the purchasing agent for the Yellowstone Park Association at Mammoth Hot Springs. Hamilton spent subsequent summers as secretary to Harry W. Child, president of the Yellowstone Park Company, which operated the hotels in the park. From 1907 Hamilton was assistant to T.E. Farrow, Superintendent of Hotels. During this time, Hamilton became friends with Huntley Child Sr., son of Harry Child. In 1915 the Klamer store at Old Faithful came on the market and was offered to Huntley, who turned it down but informed Hamilton of the opportunity. Hamilton bought the store for $20,000 with Huntley Child's backing. Hamilton established himself at the Klamer store, which eventually became known as "Hamilton's Lower Store", in a six-room apartment on the upper floor. His office, papered with $1,839,105.60 in checks, was called the "Million Dollar Room." After Army service during World War I, Charles Hamilton married Eva Victoria Spence in 1920.

Hamilton's sisters, Alma Sybil (Syb) Hamilton Parkes, Pauline (Pearl) Hamilton Samson and Eva (Eve) Kraebel de Greve, and cousin Laura Christine Marston d'Allemagne all worked in the stores.

== Expansion ==
In 1916 Hamilton agreed to a 50–50 share of the automotive service concession with the Childs and opened filling stations at Old Faithful and West Thumb. Hamilton offered cooked meals in the stores from 1927.

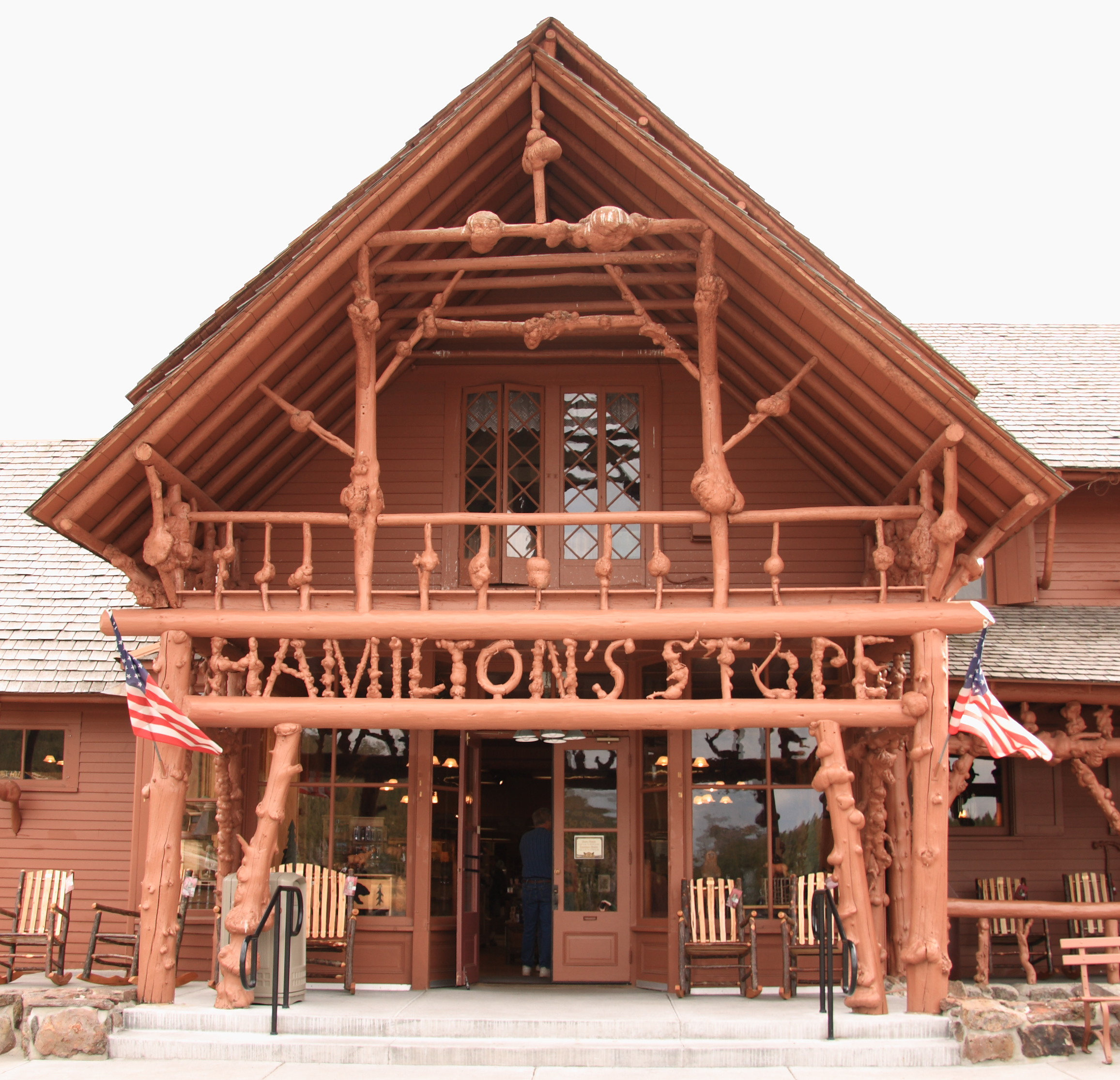
Porch at Lower Store, Old Faithful

- Lower Store, Old Faithful - Built in 1897 as Klamer's General Store, Charles Hamilton bought this store in 1902 from Henry Klamer's widow, Mary. Substantially altered in 1904 with a log and twig decoration, this store epitomizes the rustic style. The rustic detailing is attributed to Robert Reamer, who had completed the nearby Old Faithful Inn the year before. The building was enlarged in 1924, and the elaborate burled log porch was added in 1925. A plaque on the porch reads, "Designed and built by M.C. Schwerdt, 818 Trd. Ave, SE, Great Falls, Mont". Old Faithful Historic District
- Upper Store, Old Faithful (44.4569°N 110.8268°W) - A much larger store built in 1929 near main parking areas with employee dormitories upstairs. The store was originally known as the Basin Auto Camp and was built to serve automobile-borne visitors in the Old Faithful tent camp. Old Faithful Historic District
- Lake General Store (44.5500°N 110.3964°W) - Octagonal center structure with radiating wings near the Lake Hotel, built in 1922.
- Fishing Bridge General Store (44.5646°N 110.3754°W) - Faux-log concrete structure.
- West Thumb Store - Located in an old lunch station.

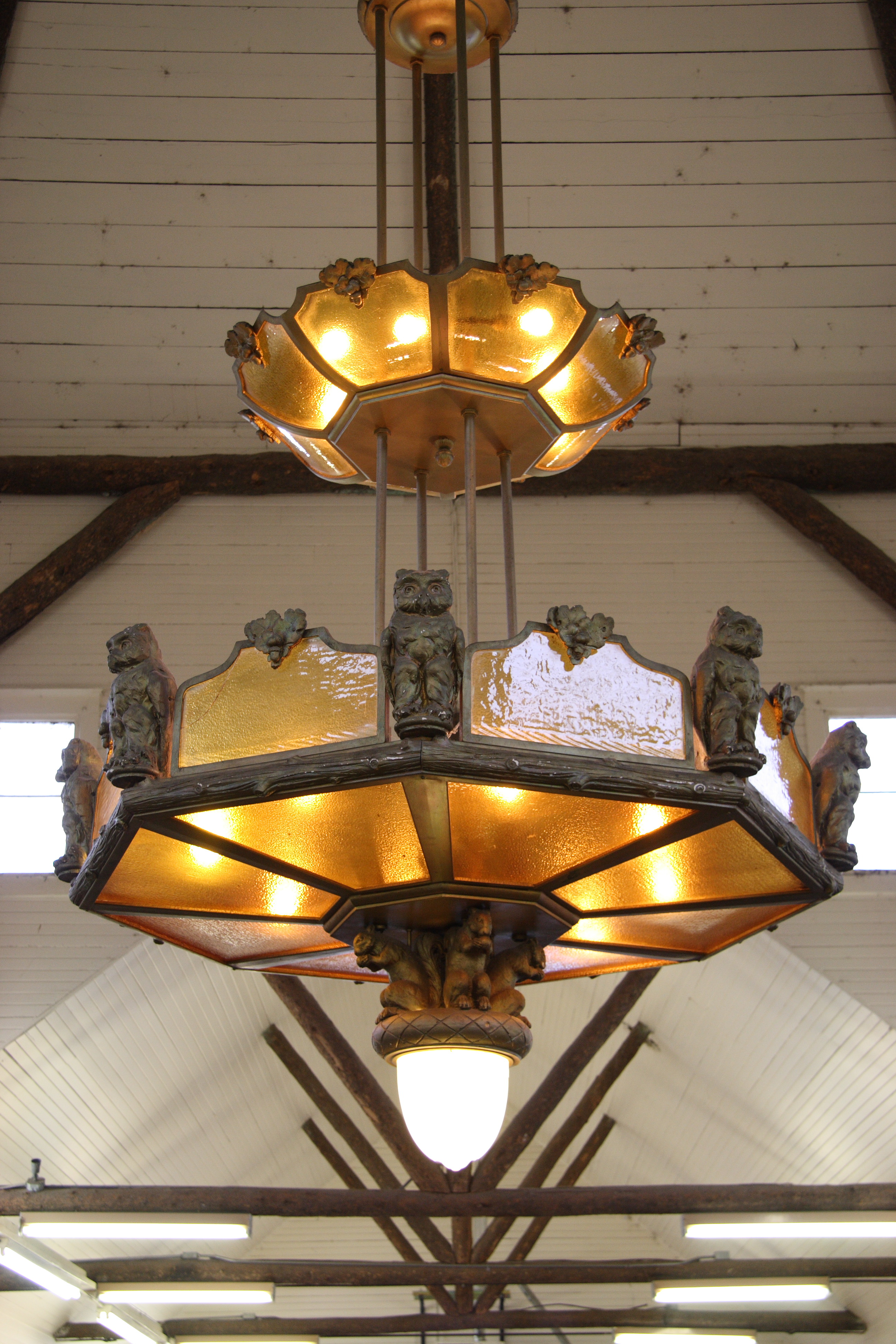
Chandelier at Lake Store

In 1953 Hamilton gained control of most park concessions by purchasing stores at Mammoth Hot Springs and Canyon. Hamilton also operated bathhouses at Old Faithful from 1933, when he bought the geyser-fed pool from Henry Brothers, until 1951 when they were demolished as inappropriate for a national park.

As a result of a 1998 change in National Park Service policy which eliminated preferences for established businesses in parks, Hamilton's Stores lost the concessions contract in Yellowstone to Delaware North in 2002 and ceased operations.
