= Lendrum McMeans =

Canadian politician (1859–1941)

Lendrum McMeans (July 30, 1859 – September 13, 1941) was a politician in Manitoba, Canada. He served in the Legislative Assembly of Manitoba from 1910 to 1914, and was later appointed to the Senate of Canada. McMeans was a member of the Conservative Party.

McMeans was born in Brantford, Canada West (now Ontario), the son of Andrew McMeans, and was educated in Brantford and Toronto. He received a law degree and was called to the Ontario bar in 1881. He came to Manitoba in 1882 and was called to the Manitoba bar the following year. In 1884, he married Mary Beatrice Harris. McMeans was also the president of First National Reality Co., Ltd, and was a commissioner for the revision of the Manitoba statutes in 1902. In religion, he was a member of the Church of England. McMeans served on the city council for Winnipeg and was also a police commissioner and a License Commissioner for Manitoba.

McMeans was elected to the Manitoba legislature in the 1910 provincial election as a member of the provincial Conservative Party, defeating former Liberal Party leader Edward Brown by 49 votes in the constituency of Winnipeg South. The Conservatives won this election, and McMeans served as a backbench supporter of Rodmond Roblin's administration for the next four years.

He was defeated in the 1914 election, losing to Liberal candidate Albert B. Hudson by 98 votes in Winnipeg South "A". He attempted to return to the legislature in the 1915 election, but was resoundingly defeated by Liberal incumbent William Parrish in Winnipeg South "B".

McMeans was appointed to the Senate of Canada by prime minister Robert Borden on July 26, 1917. He served until his death. He introduced at least two bills dealing with the rights of the accused.

He died in Winnipeg in 1941 from complications resulting from a fall. He is commemorated with McMeans Avenue in his honour.
