= Winnipeg South (provincial electoral district) =

Defunct provincial electoral district in Manitoba, Canada

Winnipeg South was a provincial electoral district in Manitoba, Canada, which existed on two separate occasions.

It was initially created for the 1883 provincial election, and abolished with the 1920 election and merged with Winnipeg Centre and Winnipeg North into a single ten-member constituency known as Winnipeg. It was re-established out of Winnipeg for the elections of 1949 and 1953 as a four-member constituency, and was divided into the ridings of River Heights, Fort Rouge, Osborne, Wolseley, and Winnipeg Centre in 1958.

== Members of the Legislative Assembly ==
=== Original constituency ===
The original Winnipeg South constituency was created for the 1883 election, when the Winnipeg constituency was divided into two sections: Winnipeg North and Winnipeg South. It was created a single-member constituency, and remained this way until the 1914 election when it returned two members. From 1914 to 1920, electors were allowed to cast ballots for two seats, which were called "Winnipeg South A" and "Winnipeg South B".

Winnipeg South covered the most affluent and middle-class areas of Winnipeg, and usually supported the winning party in provincial elections. Premier Hugh John Macdonald represented the constituency from 1899 to 1900.

==== Winnipeg South ====
This riding has elected the following members of the Legislative Assembly of Manitoba:

Name	Party	Took office	Left office
Albert Killam	Liberal	1883	1885
Charles Hamilton	Conservative	1885	1886
William Luxton	Liberal	1886	1888
Isaac Campbell	Liberal	1888	1891
John Cameron	Liberal	1891	1899
Hugh John Macdonald	Conservative	1899	1900
James Thomas Gordon	Conservative	1900	1910
Lendrum McMeans	Conservative	1910	1914

==== Winnipeg South A ====
Name	Party	Took office	Left office
Albert B. Hudson	Liberal	1914	1920

==== Winnipeg South B ====
Name	Party	Took office	Left office
William L. Parrish	Liberal	1914	1920

=== Re-established constituency ===
The single constituency of Winnipeg was divided into three sections for the 1949 election: Winnipeg North, Winnipeg Centre and Winnipeg South. All three constituencies elected four members to the legislature, with electors choosing members by a single transferable ballot.

By this time, Winnipeg South had become well-established as the most conservative and middle-class section of Winnipeg. It was dominated by the Civic Election Committee at the municipal level, and regularly returned pro-business candidates at the provincial level. The division returned a total of five representatives, all of whom were prominent figures. Liberal-Progressives John Stewart McDiarmid and Ronald Turner served as cabinet ministers in the administration of Douglas Campbell. Dufferin Roblin became leader of the Progressive Conservative Party in 1954 and Premier of Manitoba in 1958, and included Gurney Evans in his cabinet. Lloyd Stinson was Winnipeg South's sole representative from the left, winning election for the socialist Cooperative Commonwealth Federation in both 1949 and 1953. He was named as the Manitoba CCF's leader in 1953.

The constituency was eliminated at the 1958 election, when Manitoba abolished its multi-member seats. Several single-member constituencies were created in its place.

==== Winnipeg South (1949–1958) ====
Name	Party	Took office	Left office
John Stewart McDiarmid	Liberal–Progressive	1949	1953
Ronald Turner	Liberal–Progressive	1949	1958
Lloyd Stinson	CCF	1949	1958
Dufferin Roblin	Independent Progressive Conservative	1949	1950
Dufferin Roblin	Progressive Conservative	1950	1958
Gurney Evans	Progressive Conservative	1953	1958

== Election results ==
=== 1883 ===
1883 Manitoba general election
Party	Candidate	Votes	%
Liberal	Albert Clements Killam	259	56.92
Conservative	Charles Richard Tuttle	196	43.08
Total valid votes		455	–
Rejected		N/A	–
Eligible voters / Turnout		N/A	–
Source(s) Source: Manitoba. Chief Electoral Officer (1999). Statement of Votes for the 37th Provincial General Election, September 21, 1999 (PDF) (Report). Winnipeg: Elections Manitoba.

=== 1885 by-election ===
Manitoba provincial by-election, 1885
Party	Candidate	Votes	%	±%
Conservative	Charles Edward Hamilton	606	53.39	10.32
Liberal	William Luxton	529	46.61	-10.32
Total valid votes		1,135	–	–
Rejected		N/A	–	
Eligible voters / Turnout		N/A	–	–
Source(s) Source: Manitoba. Chief Electoral Officer (1999). Statement of Votes for the 37th Provincial General Election, September 21, 1999 (PDF) (Report). Winnipeg: Elections Manitoba.

=== 1886 ===
1886 Manitoba general election
Party	Candidate	Votes	%	±%
Liberal	William Luxton	1,012	50.98	4.37
Conservative	William Bain Scarth	973	49.02	-4.37
Total valid votes		1,985	–	–
Rejected		N/A	–	
Eligible voters / Turnout		4,512	43.99	–
Source(s) Source: Manitoba. Chief Electoral Officer (1999). Statement of Votes for the 37th Provincial General Election, September 21, 1999 (PDF) (Report). Winnipeg: Elections Manitoba.

=== 1888 ===
1888 Manitoba general election
Party	Candidate	Votes	%	±%
Liberal	Isaac Campbell	693	60.63	9.65
Conservative	Gilbert McMicken	450	39.37	-9.65
Total valid votes		1,143	–	–
Rejected		N/A	–	
Eligible voters / Turnout		N/A	–	–
Source(s) Source: Manitoba. Chief Electoral Officer (1999). Statement of Votes for the 37th Provincial General Election, September 21, 1999 (PDF) (Report). Winnipeg: Elections Manitoba.

=== 1892 by-election ===
Manitoba provincial by-election, 1892
Party	Candidate	Votes	%	±%
Liberal	John Donald Cameron	766	53.42	-7.21
Conservative	Daniel Emes Sprague	668	46.58	7.21
Total valid votes		1,434	–	–
Rejected		N/A	–	
Eligible voters / Turnout		N/A	–	–
Source(s) Source: Manitoba. Chief Electoral Officer (1999). Statement of Votes for the 37th Provincial General Election, September 21, 1999 (PDF) (Report). Winnipeg: Elections Manitoba.

=== 1892 ===
1892 Manitoba general election
Party	Candidate	Votes	%	±%
Liberal	John Donald Cameron	874	54.52	1.11
Conservative	Daniel Emes Sprague	729	45.48	-1.11
Total valid votes		1,603	–	–
Rejected		N/A	–	
Eligible voters / Turnout		2,142	74.84	–
Source(s) Source: Manitoba. Chief Electoral Officer (1999). Statement of Votes for the 37th Provincial General Election, September 21, 1999 (PDF) (Report). Winnipeg: Elections Manitoba.

=== 1896 ===
1896 Manitoba general election
Party	Candidate	Votes	%	±%
Liberal	John Donald Cameron	Acclaimed	–	–
Total valid votes			–	–
Rejected		N/A	–	
Eligible voters / Turnout		2,464	–	–
Source(s) Source: Manitoba. Chief Electoral Officer (1999). Statement of Votes for the 37th Provincial General Election, September 21, 1999 (PDF) (Report). Winnipeg: Elections Manitoba.

=== 1899 ===
1899 Manitoba general election
Party	Candidate	Votes	%	±%
Conservative	Hugh John Macdonald	1,283	51.20	–
Liberal	John Donald Cameron	1,223	48.80	–
Total valid votes		2,506	–	–
Rejected		N/A	–	
Eligible voters / Turnout		3,336	75.12	75.12
Source(s) Source: Manitoba. Chief Electoral Officer (1999). Statement of Votes for the 37th Provincial General Election, September 21, 1999 (PDF) (Report). Winnipeg: Elections Manitoba.

=== 1900 by-election ===
Manitoba provincial by-election, 1900
Party	Candidate	Votes	%	±%
Government	Hugh John Macdonald	Acclaimed	–	–
Total valid votes			–	–
Rejected		N/A	–	
Eligible voters / Turnout		N/A	–	–
Source(s) Source: Manitoba. Chief Electoral Officer (1999). Statement of Votes for the 37th Provincial General Election, September 21, 1999 (PDF) (Report). Winnipeg: Elections Manitoba.

=== 1901 by-election ===
Manitoba provincial by-election, 1901
Party	Candidate	Votes	%	±%
Government	James Thomas Gordon	Acclaimed	–	–
Total valid votes			–	–
Rejected		N/A	–	
Eligible voters / Turnout		N/A	–	–
Source(s) Source: Manitoba. Chief Electoral Officer (1999). Statement of Votes for the 37th Provincial General Election, September 21, 1999 (PDF) (Report). Winnipeg: Elections Manitoba.

=== 1903 ===
1903 Manitoba general election
Party	Candidate	Votes	%	±%
Conservative	James Thomas Gordon	1,807	52.53	–
Liberal	John Donald Cameron	1,633	47.47	–
Total valid votes		3,440	–	–
Rejected		N/A	–	
Eligible voters / Turnout		4,251	80.92	–
Source(s) Source: Manitoba. Chief Electoral Officer (1999). Statement of Votes for the 37th Provincial General Election, September 21, 1999 (PDF) (Report). Winnipeg: Elections Manitoba.

=== 1907 ===
1907 Manitoba general election
Party	Candidate	Votes	%	±%
Conservative	James Thomas Gordon	2,122	51.63	-0.90
Liberal	Benjamin Elswood Chaffey	1,988	48.37	0.90
Total valid votes		4,110	–	–
Rejected		N/A	–	
Eligible voters / Turnout		4,823	85.22	4.29
Source(s) Source: Manitoba. Chief Electoral Officer (1999). Statement of Votes for the 37th Provincial General Election, September 21, 1999 (PDF) (Report). Winnipeg: Elections Manitoba.

=== 1910 ===
1910 Manitoba general election
Party	Candidate	Votes	%	±%
Conservative	Lendrum McMeans	2,548	50.51	-1.12
Liberal	Edward Brown	2,497	49.49	1.12
Total valid votes		5,045	–	–
Rejected		N/A	–	
Eligible voters / Turnout		6,011	83.93	-1.29
Source(s) Source: Manitoba. Chief Electoral Officer (1999). Statement of Votes for the 37th Provincial General Election, September 21, 1999 (PDF) (Report). Winnipeg: Elections Manitoba.

=== 1914 ===
==== Winnipeg South A ====
1914 Manitoba general election
Party	Candidate	Votes	%
Liberal	Albert Hudson	5,861	54.65
Conservative	Lendrum McMeans	4,863	45.35
Total valid votes		10,724	–
Rejected		N/A	–
Eligible voters / Turnout		12,453	86.12
Source(s) Source: Manitoba. Chief Electoral Officer (1999). Statement of Votes for the 37th Provincial General Election, September 21, 1999 (PDF) (Report). Winnipeg: Elections Manitoba.

==== Winnipeg South B ====
1914 Manitoba general election
Party	Candidate	Votes	%
Liberal	William Parrish	5,812	54.25
Conservative	Henry Walter Whitla	4,902	45.75
Total valid votes		10,714	–
Rejected		N/A	–
Eligible voters / Turnout		12,453	86.04
Source(s) Source: Manitoba. Chief Electoral Officer (1999). Statement of Votes for the 37th Provincial General Election, September 21, 1999 (PDF) (Report). Winnipeg: Elections Manitoba.

=== 1915 ===
==== Winnipeg South A ====
1915 Manitoba general election
Party	Candidate	Votes	%	±%
Liberal	Albert Hudson	5,986	74.85	20.20
Conservative	William J. Boyd	2,011	25.15	-20.20
Total valid votes		7,997	–	–
Rejected		N/A	–	
Eligible voters / Turnout		11,025	72.54	-13.58
Source(s) Source: Manitoba. Chief Electoral Officer (1999). Statement of Votes for the 37th Provincial General Election, September 21, 1999 (PDF) (Report). Winnipeg: Elections Manitoba.

==== Winnipeg South B ====
1915 Manitoba general election
Party	Candidate	Votes	%	±%
Liberal	William Parrish	5,635	70.99	16.74
Conservative	Lendrum McMeans	2,303	29.01	-16.74
Total valid votes		7,938	–	–
Rejected		N/A	–	
Eligible voters / Turnout		11,025	72.00	-14.04
Source(s) Source: Manitoba. Chief Electoral Officer (1999). Statement of Votes for the 37th Provincial General Election, September 21, 1999 (PDF) (Report). Winnipeg: Elections Manitoba.

=== 1949 ===
1949 Manitoba general election
Party	Candidate	Votes	%	±%
Liberal–Progressive	John Stewart McDiarmid	6,466	19.69	–
Co-operative Commonwealth	Lloyd Stinson	6,346	19.32	–
Independent Conservative	Dufferin Roblin	5,557	16.92	–
Liberal–Progressive	Ronald Turner	5,526	16.82	–
Independent	L. F. Greene	3,959	12.05	–
Liberal–Progressive	John Gurzon Harvey	3,003	9.14	–
Progressive Conservative	Alexander John Stringer	1,990	6.06	–
Total valid votes		32,847	–	–
Rejected		155	–	
Eligible voters / Turnout		53,742	61.41	–
Source(s) Source: Manitoba. Chief Electoral Officer (1999). Statement of Votes for the 37th Provincial General Election, September 21, 1999 (PDF) (Report). Winnipeg: Elections Manitoba.

=== 1953 ===
The election in this district used single transferable vote. Shown here is the first round of voting only, as the official report only shows this round.

1953 Manitoba general election
Party	Candidate	Votes	%	±%	Elected
Liberal–Progressive	Ronald Turner	8,007	27.49	+7.47	check
Progressive Conservative	Dufferin Roblin	6,045	20.75	+8.28	check
Co-operative Commonwealth	Lloyd Stinson	4,934	16.94	-6.05	check
Progressive Conservative	Gurney Evans	4,221	14.49		check
Progressive Conservative	Jane Dagg McGovern "Maude" McCreery	1,820	6.25		
Liberal–Progressive	George Peterkin MacLeod	1,806	6.20		
Co-operative Commonwealth	Abraham Montague "Monty" Israels	1,117	3.83		
Social Credit	Doreen Benjamin	612	2.10	–	
Social Credit	Jemina Webster	566	1.94	–	
Total valid votes		29,128	98.92	–	
Rejected		319	1.08	+0.52	
Turnout		29,447	52.52	+0.87	
Eligible voters		56,065			
Source(s) Source: Sayers, A.M. (2017). "1953 Manitoba Election". Canadian Elections Database.

== See also ==
- List of Manitoba provincial electoral districts
- Canadian provincial electoral districts
