= William Parrish =

Canadian politician from Manitoba (1860–1949)

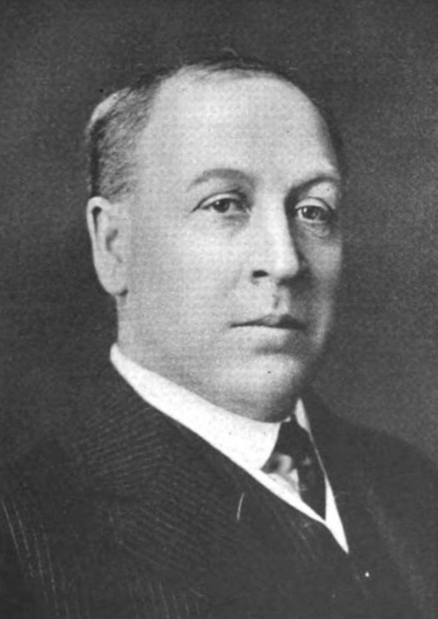

Member of the Legislative Assembly of Manitoba
- In office 1914–1920

Personal details
- Born: William Linton Parrish; August 6, 1860 Vroomanton, Canada West
- Died: February 20, 1949 (aged 88) Winnipeg, Manitoba
- Party: Liberal
- Spouse: Annie Ellen Card (m. 1885; died 1938)
- Occupation: Grain merchant, politician

William Linton Parrish (August 6, 1860 – February 20, 1949) was a politician in Manitoba, Canada. He served in the Legislative Assembly of Manitoba from 1914 to 1920 as a member of the Liberal Party.

== Biography ==
Parrish was born in Vroomanton, Canada West (now Ontario), the son of Samuel Parrish and Jane Cash, and was educated at Uxbridge. He began work in the grain trade with his father and then, in 1879, moved to Huntsville where he operated a grist and flour mill. In 1881, Parrish moved to Manitoba and operated as a grain dealer in Brandon and then, later, in Winnipeg. In 1885, he married Annie Ellen Card. He was a member of Brandon town council for two years. Parrish also served as president of the Winnipeg Grain Exchange. In 1909, he co-founded the Parrish & Heimbecker grain company. He was also the director of Fidelity Trust Co., Equitable Trust Co., Capital Loan Co. and Inland Mortgage Co. Parrish was an honorary captain and paymaster with the 90th Winnipeg Rifles, and was a Methodist in religion.

He was first elected to the Manitoba legislature in the 1914 provincial election, defeating Conservative Harry W. Whitlaw by 910 votes in the constituency of Winnipeg South "B". The Conservatives won this election, and Parrish sat with his party in opposition.

In 1915, the Conservative administration of Rodmond Roblin was forced to resign from office amid a corruption scandal. A new election was called, which the Liberals won in a landslide. Parrish was easily re-elected in his constituency, defeating Conservative Lendrum McMeans by 3,332 votes. He served as a backbench supporter of Tobias Norris's administration for the next five years.

Winnipeg's electoral boundaries were dramatically changed before the 1920 provincial election. The city became a single ten-member constituency, with members elected by a single transferable ballot. Parrish finished 17th on the first count with 945 votes, and was eliminated on the 28th count.

William Parrish died in Winnipeg on February 20, 1949.
