= Albert Hudson =

Canadian politician and judge (1875–1947)

The Honourable Albert Blellock Hudson
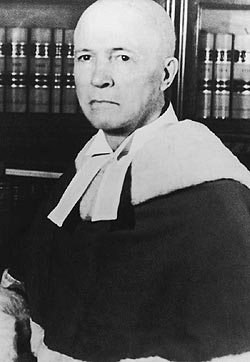

Puisne Justice of the Supreme Court of Canada
- In office March 24, 1936 – January 6, 1947
- Nominated by: William Lyon Mackenzie King
- Preceded by: John Henderson Lamont
- Succeeded by: Charles Holland Locke

Member of the Legislative Assembly of Manitoba for Winnipeg South "A"
- In office 1914–1920
- Preceded by: Lendrum McMeans
- Succeeded by: None (constituency abolished)

Attorney General of Manitoba
- In office May 15, 1915 – November 10, 1917
- Premier: Tobias Norris
- Preceded by: James H. Howden
- Succeeded by: Thomas Herman Johnson

Member of the Canadian Parliament for Winnipeg South
- In office December 6, 1921 – October 28, 1925
- Preceded by: George William Allan
- Succeeded by: Robert Rogers

Personal details
- Born: August 21, 1875 Pembroke, Ontario, Canada
- Died: January 6, 1947 (aged 71) Ottawa, Ontario, Canada
- Education: University of Manitoba
- Profession: Lawyer

Albert Blellock Hudson (August 21, 1875 – January 6, 1947) was a politician, lawyer and judge from Manitoba, Canada. He served in the Legislative Assembly of Manitoba from 1914 to 1920 as a member of the Manitoba Liberal Party, and was a cabinet minister in the government of Tobias Norris. He later served in the House of Commons of Canada from 1921 to 1925, as a member of the Liberal Party of Canada. In 1936, Hudson was appointed to the Supreme Court of Canada.

== Early life ==
Hudson was born in Pembroke, Ontario, the son of Albert Hudson and Elizabeth Blellock, and was educated in Portage la Prairie and Winnipeg. He received a law degree from the University of Manitoba in 1898 and was called to the Manitoba bar the next year.

== Legal and political career ==
He founded the firm of Hudson, Ormond & Marlatt, with which he practised law for thirty-one years. In 1914, he was named King's Counsel. Hudson married Mary R. Russell in 1908. In religion, Hudson was a Presbyterian.

He was first elected to the Manitoba legislature in the provincial election of 1914, defeating incumbent Conservative Lendrum McMeans by 998 votes in the Winnipeg South "A" constituency. The Conservatives won this election, and Hudson sat with his party on the opposition benches.

The Conservative administration of Rodmond Roblin was forced to resign from office in 1915 amid a corruption scandal, and the Liberals were called on to form a new government. Norris was sworn in as Premier of Manitoba on May 15, 1915, and named Hudson as his Attorney-General and Minister of Telephones and Telegraphs. A new election was called, which the Liberals won in a landslide. Hudson was easily returned in Winnipeg South "A", and held both of his cabinet portfolios until resigning from office November 10, 1917. According to a Winnipeg Free Press report, Hudson had wanted to resign for several months to better oversee his personal business. He served as a backbencher for the remainder of legislative sitting, and did not seek re-election in the 1920 campaign.

Hudson then moved to national politics, seeking election to the Canadian House of Commons in the 1921 federal election as an Independent Liberal. He defeated Conservative George Nelson Jackson by 2,866 votes, as well as the official Liberal candidate William Robert Hogarth, to win the Winnipeg South riding, and served as a private member for the next four years. He did not seek re-election in the 1925 campaign. During this time, Hudson rejected two offers from Prime Minister William Lyon Mackenzie King to serve in his cabinet.

== Justice of the Supreme Court of Canada ==
On March 24, 1936, Prime Minister William Lyon Mackenzie King appointed Hudson to the Supreme Court at the age of 60. Hudson filled the western vacancy created by the death of John Henderson Lamont of Saskatchewan on March 10, 1936. While Hudson was viewed favourably in Liberal circles, he did not actively seek an appointment to the Court, although he made it known he would accept the appointment. Contemporary perception of the appointment was positive, especially from the Prairie provinces and Liberals.

He held this position until his death in 1947.

== Archives ==
There is an Albert Blellock Hudson fonds at Library and Archives Canada. Archival reference number is R4653.

== Works cited ==
- Bushnell, Ian (1992). Captive Court: A Study of the Supreme Court of Canada. McGill-Queen's University Press. ISBN 978-0-7735-0851-4.
- Snell, James G.; Vaughan, Frederick (1985). The Supreme Court of Canada: History of the Institution. Toronto: The Osgoode Society. ISBN 978-0-8020-3417-5.

Legal offices
Preceded by John Henderson Lamont	Puisne Justice of the Supreme Court of Canada; March 24, 1936 – January 6, 1947	Succeeded by Charles Locke
