= James Andrews Miller =

Canadian politician (1839–1886)

James Andrews Miller, QC (July 29, 1839 – November 1, 1886) was a lawyer, judge and political figure in Manitoba. He represented Rat Portage from 1883 to 1886 in the Legislative Assembly of Manitoba as a Conservative. His name also appears as James Andrew Miller in some sources.

He was born in Galt, Upper Canada, the son of John Miller, and was educated in Galt, in Simcoe, in Toronto and at Trinity College. Miller articled in law in St. Catharines, was called to the Ontario bar in 1863 and practised law in St. Catharines. In 1865, he married Henrietta Ranney. He ran unsuccessfully for the federal Lincoln seat in an 1877 by-election as a Conservative. In 1880, he was named Queen's Counsel and, a few days later, was named to the Court of Queen's Bench of Manitoba. Unhappy with his salary as judge and that he was not made Chief Justice as promised, Miller resigned from the bench in December 1882. He was named to the Manitoba bar the following year.

Miller ran unsuccessfully in the Rockwood provincial riding in the general election of 1883. He was elected for Rat Portage later that year; jurisdiction of part of the area covered by the riding was disputed between Ontario and Manitoba. Miller was named to the cabinet as Attorney General. However, the judicial committee of the Privy Council ruled in Ontario's favour in July 1884 and Miller was forced to leave cabinet and resign from the assembly.

In 1885, he was named registrar general for the province. On October 27, 1886, Miller slipped and fell on the steps of the McKenzie Hotel in Winnipeg, where he was living at the time. He died from his injuries five days later.
