= Keith McCaskill =

Canadian police chief in Winnipeg

- Born: 1954 (age 71–72); Winnipeg, Manitoba, Canada
- Spouse: Grace McCaskill (m 1986)
- Police career
- Country: 30 years
- Department: Winnipeg Police Service
- Service years: 1976–2012
- Rank: Chief of Police

Keith McCaskill was police chief of the Winnipeg Police Service (WPS), located in Winnipeg, Manitoba, Canada. He took office on December 10, 2007. At the time of his appointment, he was a 29-year veteran of the WPS. On March 2, 2012, McCaskill announced his retirement as Chief of Police, saying he would step down when his term ends on December 9, 2012. He has been succeeded by Devon Clunis.

== Early years ==
McCaskill was born and raised in Winnipeg and worked at the St. James Parks Board before joining the force. His father was Police Chief with the St. James Assiniboine District.

== Controversies ==
In the summer of 2008, McCaskill's first after taking office, there were two controversial incidents—a shooting and a taser-related death—involving WPS officers and Aboriginal peoples in Canada. McCaskill has stated he wants to gain the trust of the aboriginal community in Winnipeg.

That summer, McCaskill also testified at the Taman Inquiry, an investigation into the prosecution of Derek Harvey-Zenk, a former WPS Constable who rear ended and killed Crystal Taman, a 40-year-old mother of three, while he was allegedly impaired. At the inquiry, there were allegations that fellow officers were covering up for Harvey-Zenk, and McCaskill urged testifying officers to "be truthful".

== See also ==
- Winnipeg Police Service
