= Parrish & Heimbecker =

Canadian grain company

Parrish & Heimbecker, Limited

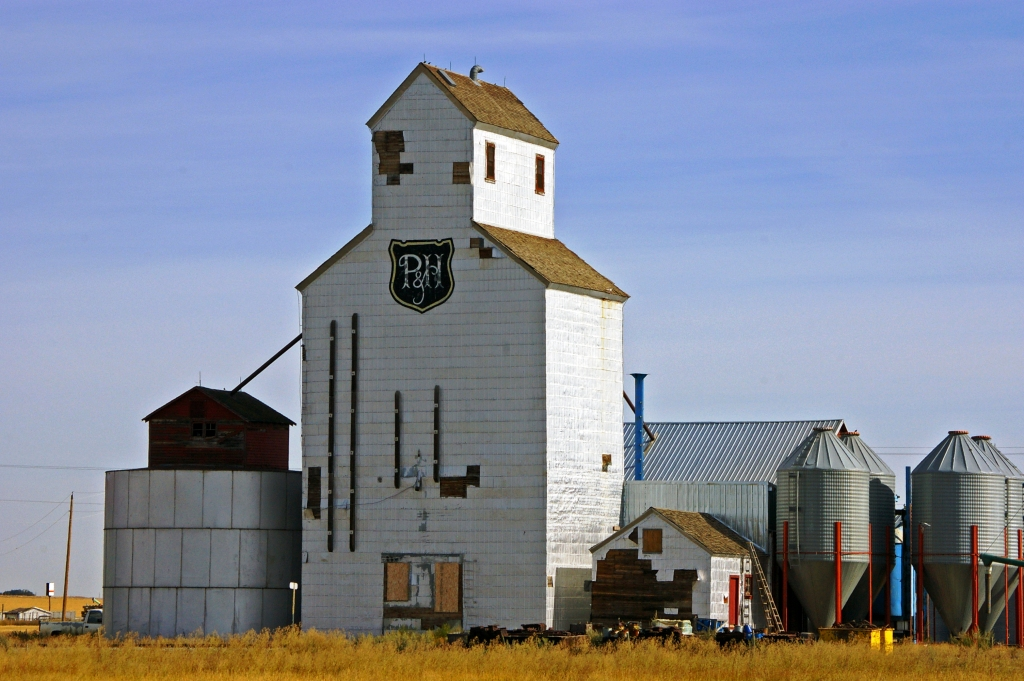
- Type: Private, family-owned
- Industry: Agriculture, agribusiness
- Founded: April 14, 1909; 117 years ago
- Founder: William L. Parrish; Norman G. Heimbecker
- Headquarters: 201 Portage Avenue, Suite 1400, Winnipeg, Manitoba, Canada
- Area served: Canada; customers in 35 countries
- Key people: John Heimbecker (CEO)
- Products: Grain handling and marketing, crop inputs, flour, animal feed, eggs
- Owner: Parrish and Heimbecker families
- Number of employees: 3,000+
- Divisions: P&H Milling Group; New-Life Mills; P&H Foods Inc.
- Website: parrishandheimbecker.com

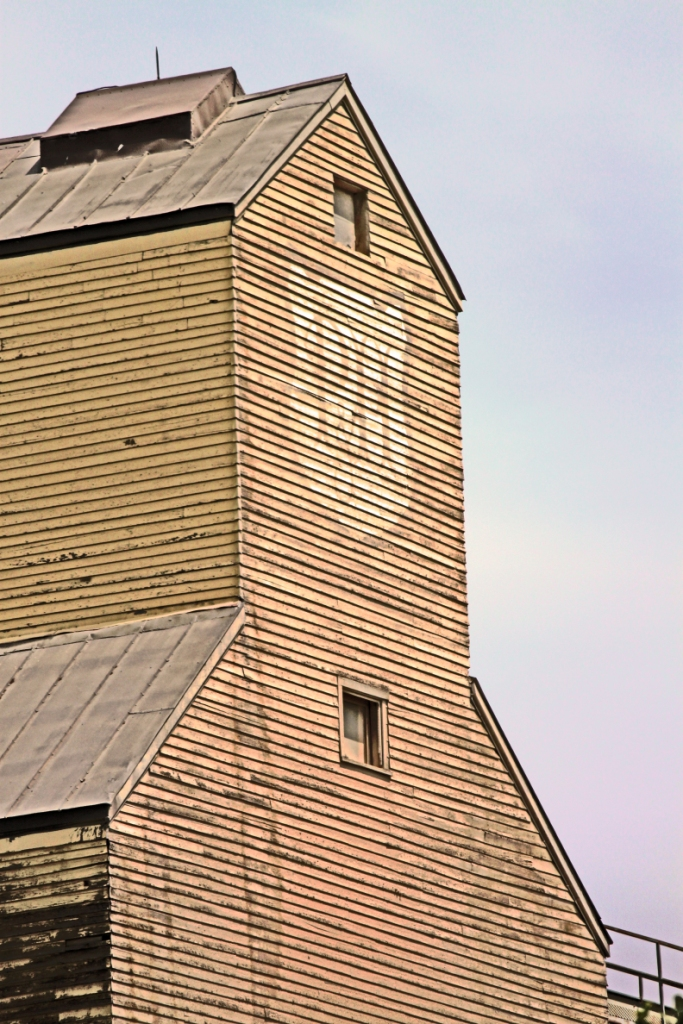
Original P&H signage, Coaldale, Alberta

Parrish & Heimbecker, Limited (P&H) is a Canadian family-owned agribusiness headquartered in Winnipeg, Manitoba. It was incorporated in Winnipeg on 14 April 1909 by William Linton Parrish and Norman George Heimbecker, and members of the two founding families still own and manage the company. P&H buys, handles and markets grain, supplies crop inputs, and operates flour mills, feed mills and egg grading facilities through divisions that include P&H Milling Group, New-Life Mills and P&H Foods. The company says it has more than 3,000 employees across Canada and customers in 35 countries.

In 2002, the company acquired a grain elevator at Dutton Siding, Manitoba from Agricore United. The elevator is located between Gilbert Plains and Grandview.

== History ==
Parrish and Heimbecker was begun in 1909 by William Parrish and Norman G. Heimbecker. Until 1918, the firm bought and sold grain on the Winnipeg Grain Exchange, but did not operate grain elevators.

In 1918, P&H bought ten elevators from Louis Strong and Frederick Dowler, who were Calgary grain brokers. By 1920, P&H had 20 elevators.

== Network of Canadian grain elevators and terminals ==
In 2011, P&H had approximately 32 grain elevators in Canada, including twelve grain elevators in Ontario, that handle a variety of Canadian agricultural products such as wheat, corn, barley, soybeans, oats, distillers grains, IP soybeans and navy beans.

== Ships ==
In the 1980s P&H bought out the bankrupt Soo River Company. They maintained a fleet of ships until they were sold to Canada Steamship Lines. P&H named most of their ships after trees, like Mapleglen. CSL now uses those names.

In 2019, P&H purchased ten grain elevators from Louis Dreyfus Company Canada ULC.

== Divisions ==
Divisions of Parrish and Heimbecker include:

- The P&H Milling Group, focused on flour milling and pea proteins
- New Life Mills, specializing in animal nutrition
