= Jack Ewatski =

- Born: 1952 (age 73–74); Winnipeg, Manitoba, Canada
- Police career
- Country: 34 years
- Department: Winnipeg Police Service
- Service years: 1973–2007
- Rank: Chief of Police

Jack Ewatski was the chief of the Winnipeg Police Service in Winnipeg, Manitoba from 1998 to 2007. He was also the president of the Canadian Association of Chiefs of Police. Ewatski was the first non-anglo chief of the force.

== Early years ==
Born in Winnipeg to a Ukrainian father and Polish mother, Ewatski attended Holy Ghost School and St. Paul's High School and joined the police force after a stint as a TV cameraman.

== Policing career ==
Ewatski worked up the ranks from Constable, to Detective, then deputy chief and finally as chief of the Winnipeg Police Service.

Ewatski announced his plans to retire in 2007 based on the fact that he has served for 34 years, and has entered a milestone in his life; the age of 55.

After retiring from Winnipeg, Ewatski was appointed deputy police commissioner of the Trinidad and Tobago Police Service in 2010 under commissioner Dwayne Gibbs, formerly of Edmonton Police Service. Ewatski retired from the Trinidad force in 2012.

== Post Policing Retirement ==
He has since returned to Winnipeg to work as a public safety consultant with Transonic Group.
