= Devon Clunis =

Canadian law enforcement officer

- Born: 1964 (age 61–62) [Jamaica]
- Police career
- Department: Winnipeg Police Service (WPS)
- Service years: 1987 – 2016
- Status: Retired
- Rank: 2012 – 2016: Chief of Police

Devon Clunis is a Canadian law enforcement officer, who was the chief of the Winnipeg Police Service from 2012 until his retirement in 2016. He was the first Black Canadian ever appointed as a police chief in Canada.

Born in Jamaica, Clunis moved with his family to Winnipeg at age 11, and settled in the city's North End. He joined the police force in 1987, and served in all areas of the force over the course of his career, including uniform patrol, traffic, investigation, community relations, organizational development, operational command and superintendent. He holds a university degree in divinity, and has also served as the force's chaplain.

After being appointed chief of the Winnipeg Police Service in November 2012, Clunis supported the continuation of community policing in neighbourhoods such as North Point Douglas that had begun under his predecessor, Keith McCaskill.

Clunis retired in July 2016, and celebrated by breaking his nearly three decade long promise to never eat a doughnut while on the force. Clunis hoped that his replacement would continue his community policing policies and focus on addressing the social issues at the root of crime.

On February 7, 2017, Clunis was awarded the Lieutenant Governor's Award for the Advancement of Interreligious Understanding by Lt.-Gov. Janice Filmon.
