= Charles Edward Hamilton =

Canadian politician

His Worship Charles Edward Hamilton

7th Mayor of Winnipeg
- In office 1885–1885

Member of the Legislative Assembly of Manitoba, Winnipeg South
- In office 1885–1886

Member of the Legislative Assembly of Manitoba, Shoal Lake
- In office 1886–1888

Personal details
- Born: 1844 Rochester, England
- Died: 25 May 1919 (aged 74–75) Ramsey County, Minnesota, U.S.
- Spouse: Alma Ashworth (m. 1884)

Charles Edward Hamilton (1844 – 25 May 1919) was a Canadian politician serving as a member of the Legislative Assembly of Manitoba and as the seventh Mayor of Winnipeg in 1885.

Born in Rochester, England, Hamilton emigrated to Canada before studying law. Hamilton married Alma Lizzie Ashworth of Ottawa. After moving from St. Catharines, Ontario to Winnipeg in 1881, he established a law practice. In the 1884 city election, he won the contest for mayor as a citizen's candidate.

On 24 February 1885, Hamilton won a provincial by-election in the Winnipeg South riding for the Conservative party. In the 1886 provincial election, he won the Shoal Lake riding.

Hamilton left provincial politics and in 1888 moved to Saint Paul, Minnesota where he became Vice-President of the Pacific and Oriental Investment Company in 1897, as well as serving as the British Vice-Consul for Minnesota. Hamilton died in 1919.

Hamilton's son, Charles Ashworth Hamilton, was the founder of Hamilton's Stores in Yellowstone National Park.

Hamilton Avenue in Winnipeg is named in C.E. Hamilton's honour.
