= Isaac Campbell =

Canadian politician (1853–1929)

Isaac Campbell, QC (June 19, 1853 – August 13, 1929) was a lawyer and political figure in Manitoba. He represented Winnipeg South from 1888 to 1891 in the Legislative Assembly of Manitoba as a Liberal.

He was born in Morpeth, Kent County, Canada West, the son of Duncan Campbell, and was educated there, at the Canadian Literary Institute (later Woodstock College) and at Osgoode Hall. Campbell was called to the Bar of Ontario in 1878, to the Bar of Manitoba in 1882 and to the Bar of the North-West Territories in 1889. He practised law in Winnipeg with John Stanley Hough; this partnership later became the basis of the legal firm Thompson Dorfman Sweatman. From 1886 to 1906, Campbell was solicitor for the city of Winnipeg. In 1890, he was named Queen's Counsel. From 1891 to 1898, Campbell was president of the Law Society of Manitoba; he also served as president of the Manitoba Bar Association and as vice-president of the Canadian Bar Association.

In 1891, Campbell resigned his seat in the Manitoba assembly to run unsuccessfully for the Winnipeg seat in the Canadian House of Commons, losing to Hugh John Macdonald.

He also was a director for the Winnipeg General Hospital. In 1908, he married Mary B. Niles (née Taylor). Campbell died at home in Winnipeg at the age of 76.
