= Winnipeg Police Service =

Canadian police force

Winnipeg Police Service Service de police de Winnipeg (French)
- Badge of the Winnipeg Police Service
- Abbreviation: WPS
- Motto: Building Relationships, A culture of safety for all (2015)

Agency overview
- Formed: 1874
- Annual budget: $320 million (2021)

Jurisdictional structure
- National agency (Operations jurisdiction): Canada
- Operations jurisdiction: Canada
- Legal jurisdiction: Winnipeg
- General nature: Local civilian police

Operational structure
- Headquarters: 245 Smith Street
- Sworn members: 1355
- Unsworn members: 562
- Elected officer responsible: The Honourable Matt Wiebe, Minister of Justice and Attorney General
- Agency executive: Gene Bowers, chief of police

Facilities
- Stations: 4

Website
- www.winnipeg.ca/police

The Winnipeg Police Service is a law enforcement agency and municipal police service to the city of Winnipeg in Manitoba, Canada

== History ==
When Winnipeg became a city, in 1873, an election was held to select the city's new mayor and aldermen. Those appointed decided to hire city officials, including a chief constable. On February 23, 1874, John S. Ingram was appointed the first Chief of Police of Winnipeg.

During the 1919 Winnipeg General Strike, most of the force was replaced with 2000 better-paid special constables, for refusing to sign a declaration promising to not belong to a union or participate in a sympathy strike, even though they remained on duty during the strike. The union was thus broken, and Chris H. Newton became the acting chief constable.

In 1972, Winnipeg merged with its eight neighbouring communities, causing their amalgamation, but still having eight police services with different uniforms and radio channels. The Royal Canadian Mounted Police (RCMP) contract for Charleswood and Headingley was cancelled, and that area fell under the inner city patrol area. On October 21, 1974, the amalgamation of the services was complete, and the remaining eight services formed into six districts. On January 1, 1975, all police officers in Winnipeg started to wear the same uniform with matching shoulder flashes that stated, "One, with the strength of many".

Police chief constables pre-amalgamation
Police chief constable	Years served
John S. Ingram	1874–1875
D. B. Murray	1875–1887
John C. McRae	1887–1911
Donald MacPherson	1911–1919
Christopher H. Newton	1919–1934
George Smith	1934–1947
Charles McIver	1947–1953
Robert T. Taft	1953–1965
George S. Blow	1965–1970
Norman M. Stewart	1970–1974

In the early 1990s, J.B. Dale Henry, a retired RCMP officer and former commander of the Manitoba "D" Division, was selected as the first chief of police not from the service's own ranks. Henry was well respected amongst minorities and sought to change and improve the image of police in Winnipeg. One of the most noticeable changes was the name for the police, from the "Winnipeg Police Force" (which it had been for 120 years), to the "Winnipeg Police Service". Another change was the addition of the motto "Community Commitment".

Henry also changed the department crest to the one known today and pictured above. The 13 golden stars on the badge represent the 13 communities that came together to form Winnipeg during the amalgamation in the 1970s, and the crocus is the provincial flower.

In 2003, city council approved a plan by the Winnipeg Police Service to go from six districts, to four. This plan involved three new police facilities. The new East District Station was completed in 2008, and the West District Station was completed in November 2013.

== Administration ==
The Winnipeg Police Service is headed by Chief of Police Gene Bowers, appointed March 17, 2025, succeeding Chief Danny Smyth who retired September 3, 2024. The three deputy chiefs are Art Stannard, Scot Halley, and Cam Mackid. The service has 1,355 officers of which approximately 20% are on the front lines, known as "general patrol" (uniform operations). The WPS also has 562 civilian workers.

== Operations ==
The Winnipeg Police Service headquarters is located at 245 Smith Street, in the former Canada Post sortation facility, in the downtown area. The previous headquarters was the Public Safety Building, built in 1966, and has been demolished to make way for the Marketlands development.

== Organization ==
The City of Winnipeg is divided into four policing districts: Downtown, West, North and East. Each district contains several generalized and specialized police units.

Specialized units include:

- Bicycle patrol
- Bomb disposal
- Canine
- Central traffic
- Crowd management
- Photo enforcement
- Pawn
- River patrol
- Underwater search and recovery
- Victim services
- Street crime
- Tactical support team (TST) – formerly the part-time emergency response unit (ERU) made up of officers trained for special circumstances, such as hostage situations, armed and barricaded incidents and search warrants
- Training – includes, police vehicle operations instructors, policy and law instructors, firearms instructors, and use of force instructors – located at the WPS Training Academy
- Division 40 – criminal investigation bureau – homicide, drugs, hate crimes, major crimes, morals, integrated proceeds of crime (IPOC), organized crime and Crime Stoppers
- Division 41 – criminal investigation bureau – missing persons, child abuse, Internet child exploitation (ICE), domestic violence, high risk offenders, sex crimes, vulnerable persons, and youth crime
- Division 42 – criminal investigation bureau – arson, commercial crime, stolen auto, pawn, surveillance and forensic services
- Flight operations
- Auxiliary force cadet section

== Fleet ==
- Ford Police Interceptor Sedan (Majority of Fleet)
- Ford Police Interceptor Utility
- Chevrolet Tahoe Police Package
- Terradyne Armored Vehicle Gurka
- EC120 Colibri

== Ranks and Insignia ==
Rank	Chief of police	Deputy chief of police	Superintendent	Inspector	Staff sergeant	Sergeant	Detective sergeant / patrol sergeant	Constable
Insignia								enter

== Recruitment ==
Potential trainees must be at least eighteen years old with a high school diploma, and able to complete the Police Officer's Physical Aptitude Test (POPAT), which determines a recruit's physical ability. Training is salaried and takes 37 weeks consisting of classroom time, use of force and in the field training with assigned field training officers who supervise them while they carry out all regular duties. After this process is finished the recruit is inducted into the police service. After five years of general patrol service, officers may apply for specialty divisions like those listed above.

== Winnipeg Police Museum ==
The Winnipeg Police Museum is a museum that displays the history of the Winnipeg Police Service from 1874 to the present. Pictures, equipment, vehicles and other artifacts are presented within the museum. An original 1911 jail cell from the North End Station is one of the highlights of the museum. In June 2016, the museum moved to a new location inside police headquarters at 245 Smith Street.

== Criticism ==
A 2020 Angus Reid poll of ten major cities in Canada found that 70% of Winnipeg residents had a favourable view of police in their community, and 26% had an unfavourable view. The remaining 4% of respondents did not answer this question. Compared alongside the other nine major cities, a greater percentage of Winnipeg residents had a favourable view of their police force than residents in Vancouver, the Greater Toronto Area, and Montreal had of their police forces. Only Vancouver and Montreal had a greater percentage of residents with a net unfavourable view of their local police forces than Winnipeg residents did.

=== Racism ===
From the years 2000-2017, the Winnipeg Police killed 19 people; 11 of those 19 people killed were Indigenous. Mi’kmaq lawyer and professor Pam Palmater has said in response to this finding that “the statistics really confirm that there is a high level of police racism abuse and violence towards Indigenous peoples.”

The group Justice 4 Black Lives Winnipeg launched a petition in 2020 that calls for defunding and abolishing the Winnipeg Police Service. Their petition states, "No reform can come from these colonial practices.... The system must be rebuilt and include marginalized voices in the process in order to protect all BIPOC to this city's full capability."

In 2022 and 2023, the Winnipeg Police Service faced widespread criticism for its refusal to search a city landfill for the remains of three Indigenous women who are believed to be the victims of an alleged serial killer. Community members, Indigenous leaders, victims’ family members, and family members of 2SMMIWG+ condemned the decision to not search the landfill sites during a press conference in Ottawa on December 8, 2022. One of the demands arising from the press conference was that Danny Smyth resign from his position as chief of police. The Assembly of First Nations National Chief RoseAnne Archibald spoke about the Winnipeg Police Service’s refusal to search the site at the United Nations on International Women’s Day 2023, saying, “There can be no greater metaphor for how Indigenous women are treated and viewed in Canada than this particular case.” Despite the Winnipeg Police Service saying the search couldn't be done, advocacy efforts led to the creation of an Indigenous-led working group tasked with evaluating the feasibility of the search. The remains of Morgan Harris and Marcedes Myran were found in the Prairie Green Landfill in February 2025.

=== Budget ===
The allocation of Winnipeg’s municipal budget towards the Winnipeg Police has drastically increased since the year 2000. While the Winnipeg Police consumed 17 percent of the City’s total operating budget in the year 2000, by 2020 this had risen to over 25% with a police budget of $304.1 million. This represents the highest proportion of funds that the City of Winnipeg gives towards any municipal department. In the same year, the City reduced funding for community groups, the maintenance of transit routes, and the Millennium Library.

Advocacy groups such as Winnipeg Police Cause Harm, Justice 4 Black Lives Winnipeg, Police-Free Schools Winnipeg, the Canadian Centre for Policy Alternatives, and the Police Accountability Coalition, which represents over 90 community-based organizations, have called for the funds allocated to the Winnipeg Police Services to be reallocated towards social services and infrastructure. A survey conducted by the Social Planning Council of Winnipeg found that Winnipeg residents are “three times as likely to favour spending more on poverty reduction than on investing in additional police services” in order to address crime.

== Officer involved shootings ==
On March 9, 1988, Winnipeg Police constable Robert Cross attempted to detain John Joseph Harper, believing Harper was an auto theft suspect. According to Cross, Harper refused to provide identification, and was shot during a scuffle when he attempted to grab Cross's gun. Initially, the shooting was ruled as justified by the internal firearms board of enquiry. The shooting and other events led to the Aboriginal Justice Inquiry, a comprehensive investigation into the treatment of First Nations people within the Manitoba justice system. In 1991, the inquiry concluded that the WPS internal investigation was faulty and intended more to exonerate Cross than to discover the truth. The report recommended that officer-involved shootings be investigated by independent parties.

=== Recent cases ===
On January 31, 2005, 18-year-old Matthew Dumas was armed with a screwdriver and was confronted by Constable Dennis Gbarek (a Metis officer). At the time, police were investigating a home invasion and Dumas was believed to be involved. The constable ordered Dumas to drop the screwdriver several times while Dumas responded by lunging at the constable and was shot. Dumas died from his injuries, It was later determined he was not involved in the home invasion. Two reviews of the shooting were performed by the Calgary Police Service in August 2006 and by the Ontario Crown Attorney's Office in May 2007 at the Manitoba government's request. Both reviews concluded the Winnipeg Police investigation of the shooting was handled properly. In June 2008, an inquest was held into Dumas's death. The inquest's report, released in December 2008, ruled that racism was not a factor in the incident.

In July, 17-year-old Michael Langan, a Métis, died after being tasered by police. Witnesses had reported a youth breaking into a vehicle, and police encountered Langan several blocks away, allegedly wielding a knife and refusing to surrender. David Chartrand, president of the Manitoba Metis Federation, suggested that racial profiling may have resulted in police using excessive force, an accusation that Police Chief Keith McCaskill denied. In August, Craig McDougall, a member of Wasagamack First Nation and nephew of John Joseph Harper, was tasered then shot by police responding to a disturbance call in the city's West End. Police reported that McDougall was brandishing a knife, though family members have disputed that claim, saying McDougall was carrying a cellular phone.

In 2020, 16-year-old Eishia Hudson was shot dead by Winnipeg Police after attempting to drive into police officers in a stolen Jeep. On New Year’s Eve, entering into the year 2024, police were called to the University of Manitoba to do a wellness check on a male experiencing a mental health crisis. Police state the 19 year old boy Afolabi Opaso was brandishing a knife, Opaso’s friends who made the call refute this claim.

=== Other incidents ===
In February 2005, a truck driven by off-duty WPS constable Derek Harvey-Zenk, reportedly drunk after having attended an all-night party, rear-ended and killed Crystal Taman, a 40-year-old woman, while she was stopped at a red light. The incident was initially investigated by East St. Paul Police. Harvey-Zenk was originally charged with "impaired driving causing death" and numerous other charges. In July 2007, however, Harvey-Zenk was pled down to "dangerous driving causing death" (a lesser charge) and given a conditional sentence of "two years less a day", to be served at his home.

Public outcry over the plea and allegations that the investigation had been botched led to a provincial inquiry, which began in June 2008. At the inquiry, multiple police officers testified that they did not notice Harvey-Zenk drinking, leading to allegations of a police cover-up. Furthermore, a waitress who served the officers liquor throughout the evening testified that she was pressured to not "remember too much" by the restaurant's manager, who was friends with the officers. Officers involved in the investigation have denied they gave preferential treatment to Harvey-Zenk.

== Chiefs of Police ==
=== Chief Constables of the Winnipeg Police Force ===
- John S. Ingram 1874–1875
- B. Murray 1875–1887
- John C. McRae 1887–1911
- Donald Macpherson 1911–1919
- Christopher H. Newton 1919–1934
- George Smith 1934–1947
- Charles McIver 1947–1953
- Robert T. Taft 1953-1965
- George S. Blow 1965–1970
- Norman M. Stewart 1970-1974

=== Chiefs of the Winnipeg Police Department ===
- Norman M. Stewart 1974-1981
- Kenneth Johnston 1981-1984
- Herb B. Stephen 1984-1991
- Dale Henry 1991-1995

=== Chiefs of the Winnipeg Police Service ===
#	Name	Term start	Term End
1	Dale Henry	1995	1996
2	David A. Cassels	May 2, 1996	October 1998
3	Jack Ewatski	1998	September 15, 2007
4	Keith McCaskill	December 10, 2007	December 9, 2012
5	Devon Clunis	October 4, 2012	July 9, 2016
6	Danny Smyth	November 4, 2016	September 3, 2024
7	Gene Bowers	March 17, 2025	Present

- Dale Henry 1995-1996
- David A. Cassels 1996-1998
- Jack Ewatski 1998-2007
- Keith McCaskill 2007-2012
- Devon Clunis 2012-2016
- Danny Smyth 2016-2025
- Gene Bowers 2025-

Source: Winnipeg Sun and WPS
