= Social Credit Party of Canada candidates in the 1962 Canadian federal election =

The Social Credit Party of Canada fielded 230 candidates in the 1962 Canadian federal election, and unexpectedly won 30 seats to become the third-largest party in the House of Commons of Canada. Most of the party's success came in the province of Quebec, where Real Caouette led a populist campaign under the Social Credit banner. Information about the party's candidates may be found on this page.

== Manitoba ==
=== Lisgar: Roger H. Poiron ===
Roger H. Poiron was a farmer, and had previously been an "Independent Social Credit" candidate in a 1955 provincial by-election. Social Credit had not planned to field a candidate on that occasion, but Poiron entered the race without consulting the party; although not technically an official candidate, he nonetheless received support from its organization. He was described as a young man in a 1955 newspaper report.

Poiron continued to farm in Somerset after 1962. In 1993, he expressed skepticism about provincial Agriculture Minister Harry Enns's declaration that Manitoba farm incomes would reach an all-time high that year.

Electoral record
Election	Division	Party	Votes	%	Place	Winner
provincial by-election, 27 June 1955	Mountain	Independent Social Credit	201	5.56	3/3	Walter Clark, Liberal-Progressive
1962 federal	Lisgar	Social Credit	3,492		3/4	George Muir, Progressive Conservative
