= Hespeler =

Hespeler may refer to:

- Hespeler, Ontario, now part of the city of Cambridge
- Jacob Hespeler, Canadian businessman and founder of the town of Hespeler
- William Hespeler, Canadian businessman and politician
- HMCS Hespeler, Royal Canadian Navy ship
- Hespeler Hockey, a brand of ice hockey equipment
