= Liberal-Progressive Party candidates in the 1959 Manitoba provincial election =

The Liberal-Progressive Party of Manitoba fielded a full slate of fifty-seven candidates in the 1959 provincial election. The party elected eleven members, retaining their status as the official opposition in the Legislative Assembly of Manitoba.

== Candidates ==
Riding	Candidate's Name	Notes	Gender	Residence	Occupation	Votes	%	Rank
Arthur	John W. McRae		M			1,932		2nd
Assiniboia	Jack Brownrigg		M			1,388		3rd
Birtle-Russell	Rod Clement	Incumbent	M			2,015		2rd
Brandon	Gordon A. Phillips		M			2,159		2nd
Brokenhead	A. A. Trapp	Incumbent for Lac du Bonnet	M			1,083		3rd
Burrows	Joseph R. Hnidan		M			1,155		3rd
Carillon	Edmond Prefontaine	Incumbent; re-elected	M			2,397		1st
Churchill	Kenneth D. Wray		M			954		2nd
Cypress	John Leslie Sundell		M			1,781		2nd
Dauphin	Emma Hildegard Ringstrom		F			967		3rd
Dufferin	Walter Clifton McDonald	Incumbent	M			1,923		2nd
Elmwood	Alex Turk		M			1,488		3rd
Emerson	John Tanchak	Incumbent; re-elected	M			2,752		1st
Ethelbert Plans	Michael Hryhorczuk	Incumbent; re-elected	M			1,856		1st
Fisher	W. J. Griffin, Jr.		M			1,028		3rd
Flin Flon	Francis Lawrence Jobin	Incumbent	M			1,728		2nd
Fort Garry	Stanley Farwell		M			2,035		2nd
Fort Rouge	Jerome Marrin		M			1,947		2nd
Gimli	Alex Hawrysh		M			1,007		2nd
Gladstone	Nelson Shoemaker	Incumbent; re-elected	M			2,469		1st
Hamiota	James Chester Scott		M			2,136		2nd
Inkster	John A. Colt		M			981		3rd
Kildonan	Cornelius K. Huebert		M			1,972		3rd
Lac du Bonnet	John Ateah		M			1,272		2nd
Lakeside	Douglas Lloyd Campbell	Incumbent; re-elected; party leader from 1948 to 1961; premier from 1948 to 1958	M			1,896		1st
La Verendrye	Stan Roberts	Incumbent; re-elected; resigned in May 1962	M			1,799		1st
Logan	John Kozoriz		M			873		3rd
Minnedosa	Charles Shuttleworth	Incumbent	M			2,029		2nd
Morris	Bruce MacKenzie		M			1,298		2nd
Osborne	David Bowman		M			1,166		3rd
Pembina	Lynwood Graham		M			1,199		2nd
Portage le Prairie	Charles Greenlay	Incumbent	M			1,827		2nd
Radisson	Nick Slotek		M			2,029		3rd
Rhineland	Wallace C. Miller	Incumbent; re-elected; died 4 October 1959	M			1,648		1st
River Heights	Keith Routley		M			3,060		2nd
Roblin	Ray Mitchell		M			1,334		3rd
Rock Lake	Walter Clark		M			1,843		2nd
Rockwood-Iberville	Robert Bend	Incumbent	M			2,143		2nd
Rupertsland	Harry Boulette		M			587		2nd
St. Boniface	Laurent Desjardins	Elected	M			3,772		1st
St. George	Elman Guttormson	Incumbent; re-elected	M			2,279		1st
St. James	David Graham		M			1,541		3rd
St. Johns	Abe Yanofsky		M			854		3rd
St. Matthews	Paul Goodman		M			1,900		3rd
Ste. Rose	Gildas Molgat	Incumbent; re-elected; party leader from 1961 to 1969	M			2,390		1st
St. Vital	George Goulet		M			1,946		2nd
Selkirk	Thomas P. Hillhouse	Incumbent; re-elected	M			1,814		1st
Seven Oaks	Calvin Scarfe		M			1,343		3rd
Souris-Lansdowne	George Adrian Griffith		M			1,448		2nd
Springfield	William Lucko	Incumbent	M			1,507		2nd
Swan River	Arvid Burst		M			786		3rd
The Pas	Marvin Hill		M			1,027		2nd
Turtle Mountain	Walter Christianson		M			1,187		2nd
Virden	John Wesley Clarke		M			1,337		2nd
Wellington	William Norrie	Future mayor of Winnipeg	M			1,624		3rd
Winnipeg Centre	J. Gurzon Harvey		M			1,462		3rd
Wolseley	Frank Muldoon		M			1,707		2nd

Source: Historical summaries, Elections Manitoba, pp. 296–297; candidate names taken from the Canadian Parliamentary Guide (1960).

== Candidates in subsequent by-elections ==
Riding	Candidate's Name	Notes	Gender	Residence	Occupation	Votes	%	Rank
Arthur (26 November 1959)	Harry Patmore		M			1,959	49.04	2nd
Cypress (26 November 1959)	John Leslie Sundell		M			1,654	41.02	2nd
Rhineland (26 November 1959)	David K. Friesen	Seat loss for party	M			1,075	29.99	3rd
Turtle Mountain (26 November 1959)	Edward Dow	Elected; seat gain for party	M			2,380	51.14	1st
Pembina (9 December 1960)	Charles Cousins		M			1,491	30.22	2nd
