= Hugh McGavin =

Canadian politician

Dr. Hugh James McGavin (14 November 1874 – 8 March 1958) was a politician in Manitoba, Canada. He served in the Legislative Assembly of Manitoba from 1927 to 1932, as a member of the Conservative Party.

McGavin was born in Paisley, Ontario, son of James McGavin, a saddler born in Catrine, Ayrshire, Scotland and Elizabeth Wright, born in Glasgow Scotland, daughter of James Wight and Jean Malcolm. He came to Manitoba in 1877.

He received a medical degree from the Manitoba Medical College, and practised as a general physician in Plum Coulee. McGavin was appointed a health officer in 1903, with a stipend of $40 per annum.

Dr. McGavin's motto was "Do all the good you can for as many people as you can for as long as you can."

He was married twice: first in 1907, to Emily Christine Bryans, who died 1918, and then to Ida Nauer shortly following the death of his first wife.

He first sought election to the Manitoba legislature in the 1910 provincial election, but lost to Liberal Valentine Winkler by 133 votes in the constituency of Rhineland. When he next ran in the 1927 election, he defeated Progressive candidate J.H. Black by 120 votes in Morden and Rhineland. (Black actually won a plurality of votes on the first count, but was defeated on transfers from the third-place candidate. Manitoba elections were determined by a single transferable ballot in this period.)

The Conservatives formed the official opposition in Manitoba after the 1927 election, and McGavin served as an opposition member for the next five years. In the 1932 campaign, he lost to Liberal-Progressive candidate Cornelius Wiebe by 447 votes.

He died at home in Plum Coulee at the age of 83.
