= Canadian Fellowship Foundation =

Charitable foundation in Canada

The Canadian Fellowship Foundation (CFF) is a federally chartered charitable foundation in Canada that exists to foster the importance of prayer on the Canadian political landscape. At a national level informal weekly prayer meetings are attended by Members of Parliament when Parliament is in session. These weekly meetings provide MPs with a non-partisan opportunity to form and deepen friendships and the participants provide support for a yearly National Prayer Breakfast, attended by our nation's leaders who are invited to meet in the spirit of Jesus and pray together, similar to the US National Prayer Breakfast. Various initiatives at a Provincial level are also encouraged.http://www.canadaprayerbreakfast.ca | The CFF is headed by Jack Murta, an 18-year member of the Canadian Parliament. The National Prayer Breakfast was first held in Ottawa in 1964. It has been held each year since, except for 1968 when it was cancelled due to a federal election, and is chaired by a Member of Parliament. The current Chair is MP Cathay Wagantall, representing the federal electoral riding of Yorkton—Melville (Saskatchewan).
