= Robert Rogers (Manitoba politician) =

Canadian politician

The Honourable Robert Rogers PC
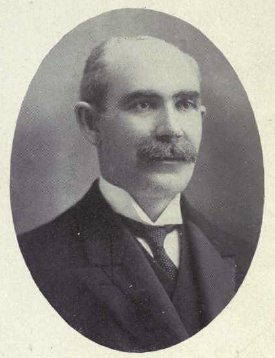

Member of the Canadian Parliament for Winnipeg
- In office 1911–1917
- Preceded by: Alexander Haggart
- Succeeded by: District was abolished in 1914

Member of the Canadian Parliament for Winnipeg South
- In office 1925–1926
- Preceded by: Albert Hudson
- Succeeded by: John Stewart McDiarmid
- In office 1930–1935
- Preceded by: John Stewart McDiarmid
- Succeeded by: Leslie Mutch

Member of the Legislative Assembly of Manitoba for Manitou
- In office 1899–1911

Personal details
- Born: 2 March 1864 Lakefield, Canada East (present-day Gore, Quebec)
- Died: 21 July 1936 (aged 72)
- Party: Conservative
- Cabinet: Provincial: Minister Without Portfolio (1900); Minister of Public Works (1900–1911); Federal: Superintendent-General of Indian Affairs (1911–1912); Minister of the Interior (1911–1912); Minister of Mines (1912); Minister of Public Works (1912–1917)

Robert Rogers, PC (2 March 1864 – 21 July 1936) was a Canadian merchant and politician. He served as a cabinet minister at the federal and provincial levels.

Rogers was born in Lakefield Canada East (now Gore, Quebec), the son of Lieutenant-Colonel George Rogers. He was educated in Lachute, Berthier and Montreal, and later moved to Winnipeg, Manitoba to become director of the Monarch Life Assurance Company. In religion, he was a member of the Church of England.

== Manitoba politics ==
He contested Lisgar in the 1896 federal election as a candidate of the federal Conservative Party, and lost to Liberal Robert Lorne Richardson by fifty-four votes. He was 32 years old.

Rogers was elected to the Legislative Assembly of Manitoba in the 1899 provincial election as a Conservative candidate, defeating Liberal candidate J.L. Brown by twenty-eight votes in Manitou. The Conservatives won this election, and Rogers sat in the legislature as a backbench supporter of Hugh John Macdonald's administration. When Rodmond Roblin succeeded Macdonald as premier on 29 October 1900, he appointed Rogers as a minister without portfolio.

On 20 December 1900, Rogers was promoted to the powerful position of Minister of Public Works. He remained in this position for eleven years, and was often regarded as the second most powerful figure in Roblin's cabinet, helping the premier construct an effective patronage network. He was re-elected without difficulty in the campaigns of 1903, 1907 and 1910.

== Federal politics ==
Rogers turned to federal politics in 1911. The federal Conservative Party under Robert Borden defeated Wilfrid Laurier's governing Liberals in the 1911 federal election, due in part to assistance from Roblin's electoral machine in Manitoba. Although Rogers was not a candidate in the election, he was appointed as Canada's Minister of the Interior and Superintendent-General of Indian Affairs on 10 October 1911. Seventeen days later, he was acclaimed to the House of Commons in a by-election for Winnipeg.

Rogers was given additional responsibilities as Minister of Mines on 30 March 1912. On 29 October 1912, he left his other portfolios to become Canada's Minister of Public Works, a position which he held for five years. He did not seek re-election in 1917.

He attempted to return to the House of Commons for Lisgar in the 1921 election, but lost to Progressive candidate John Livingstone Brown by 1,164 votes.

Rogers was returned to parliament in the 1925 election, defeating former Liberal premier Tobias Norris by 1,617 votes in Winnipeg South. In the following year's election, he lost his seat to Liberal John Stewart McDiarmid by 1,171 votes.

He was a candidate at the Conservative Party leadership convention in 1927. He finished fifth out of six candidates. His vote mostly vanished in the second vote – the leader was elected through run-off voting. His lack of French ended his drive for the leadership.

Rogers won election to the House of Commons for a third time in the 1930 election, defeating McDiarmid by 343 votes. He was not included in the cabinet of Conservative prime minister Richard Bennett, and retired from politics in 1935. He died the following year.

1921 Canadian federal election: Lisgar
Party	Candidate	Votes
Progressive	John Livingstone Brown	4,460
Conservative	Robert Rogers	3,296
