= Rosenfeld (electoral district) =

Defunct provincial electoral district in Manitoba, Canada

Rosenfeld or Rosenfeldt is a former provincial electoral district in Manitoba, Canada. It was located in Rosenfeld. The district was first appeared in the 1888 election and lasted until 1903 when the riding was re-distributed into Rhineland.

== Members of the Legislative Assembly ==
Name	Party	Took office	Left office
Enoch Winkler	Liberal	1888	1899
William Hespeler	Independent-Conservative	1900	1903

== See also ==
- List of Manitoba provincial electoral districts
- Canadian provincial electoral districts
