= Howard Winkler =

Canadian politician

Member of Parliament for Lisgar
- In office October 1935 – June 1953
- Preceded by: John Livingstone Brown
- Succeeded by: William Albert Pommer

Personal details
- Born: Howard Waldemar Winkler; 4 March 1891 Morden, Manitoba, Canada
- Died: 14 November 1970 (aged 79) Mesa, Arizona, United States
- Party: Liberal
- Spouse: Ruth Doern (m. 1954)
- Profession: farmer

Howard Waldemar Winkler (4 March 1891 – 14 November 1970) was a Liberal party member of the House of Commons of Canada. He was born in Morden, Manitoba and became a farmer by career.

Winkler graduated from the University of Manitoba with a Bachelor of Arts in 1912, and a BSA in 1916. He also served in the military as a member of the 11th Canadian Field Ambulance unit in World War I, where he performed some duties in France. His father, Valentine Winkler, was a member of the Legislative Assembly of Manitoba and was provincial Minister of Agriculture from 1915 to 1920.

He was first elected to Parliament at the Lisgar riding in the 1935 general election and re-elected there in 1940, 1945 and 1949. Winkler left the House of Commons after completing his fourth and final term of federal office and did not seek re-election in the 1953 election.

Winkler's uncle was former MLA and Legislative Speaker Enoch Winkler.

Winkler died in the United States in 1970 in Mesa, Arizona.

1945 Canadian federal election: Lisgar
Party	Candidate	Votes
Liberal	Howard Winkler	4,552
Progressive Conservative	Wallace C. Miller	4,257
Co-operative Commonwealth	Edgar James Bailey	1,512

1949 Canadian federal election: Lisgar
Party	Candidate	Votes
Liberal	Howard Winkler	9,190
Progressive Conservative	Diedrich Heppner	5,684
Co-operative Commonwealth	Gordon Morris Atkins	1,470
