= Richard Spink Bowles =

Canadian politician

The Honourable Richard Spink Bowles

16th Lieutenant Governor of Manitoba
- In office November 1, 1965 – September 2, 1970
- Monarch: Elizabeth II
- Governors General: Georges Vanier; Roland Michener
- Premier: Duff Roblin; Walter Weir; Edward Schreyer
- Preceded by: Errick Willis
- Succeeded by: William John McKeag

Personal details
- Born: November 16, 1912 Winnipeg, Manitoba, Canada
- Died: July 9, 1988 (aged 75) Winnipeg, Manitoba, Canada
- Party: Liberal
- Education: University of Manitoba; Manitoba Law School
- Occupation: Lawyer
- Profession: Politician

Richard Spink Bowles (November 16, 1912 – July 9, 1988) was a Canadian lawyer and office holder in Manitoba, Canada. He served as the province's 16th lieutenant governor from 1965 to 1970.

Bowles had no political experience prior to his appointment as lieutenant governor, and was only the second non-political appointee to the position (James Duncan McGregor was the first, although McGregor had previously worked for the federal government in a non-partisan capacity).

Bowles was born in Winnipeg, Manitoba, and was educated at the University of Manitoba and Manitoba Law School. He practiced law from 1937 to 1965, starting his own firm in 1940. He became the first president of Winnipeg's Home and School Association in 1952, and was chairman of the Winnipeg Board of Parks and Recreation in 1956–57. He was named president of the Manitoba Bar Association in 1961, and also served as president of the Law Society of Manitoba in 1964–65.

His appointment as lieutenant governor came in recognition of his legal and community work. The position was primarily ceremonial by this time. Bowles might have been entrusted with determining Manitoba's government after the inclusive 1969 election, but the defection of Liberal MLA Laurent Desjardins to the New Democratic Party made this unnecessary.

Bowles returned to private law practice after his term in office ended. In 1969, he presented an essay on Adams George Archibald (the first lieutenant governor of Manitoba) to the Manitoba Historical Society. He later served as chancellor of the University of Manitoba from 1974 to 1977.

In 1972, Bowles campaigned for the federal House of Commons as a Liberal, in the rural riding of Lisgar. Due to the prestige of his former office, there was widespread speculation that he would be appointed to the cabinet of Prime Minister Pierre Trudeau if elected. As it happened, however, he lost to Progressive Conservative Jack Murta by 12,784 votes, obtaining only 4,469 to Murtha's 17,253. He did not return to political life thereafter.

1972 Canadian federal election: Lisgar
Party	Candidate	Votes
Progressive Conservative	Jack Murta	17,253
Liberal	Richard Spink Bowles	4,469
New Democratic	John Bucklaschuk	1,627
Social Credit	John L. Harms	943
