= William Hespeler =

Canadian politician

The Hon. William Hespeler
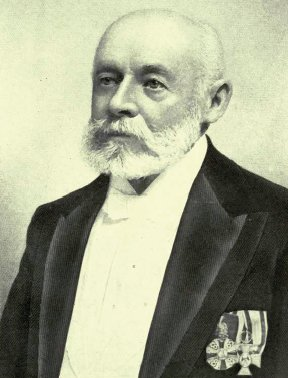

11th Speaker of the Legislative Assembly of Manitoba
- In office March 29, 1900 – December 1903
- Preceded by: Finlay McNaughton Young
- Succeeded by: James Johnson

Member of the Legislative Assembly of Manitoba for Rosenfeld
- In office December 7, 1899 – July 20, 1903
- Preceded by: Enoch Winkler - in riding of Rosenfeld
- Succeeded by: Riding abolished - merged into Rhineland

Personal details
- Born: December 29, 1830 Baden-Baden, Grand Duchy of Baden
- Died: April 18, 1921 (aged 90) Vancouver, British Columbia
- Resting place: Saint Johns Anglican Church Cemetery, Winnipeg
- Party: Independent Conservative
- Spouse: Mary Hope Keachie (1828-1872)
- Relations: Jacob Hespeler - brother, Charlotte Hespeler - mother of Adam Beck
- Children: Alfred Aemilius, Georgina Hope, Wilhelm
- Education: Polytechnic Institute at Karlsruhe
- Occupation: Businessman and immigration agent

William Hespeler (December 29, 1830 – April 18, 1921), born Wilhelm, was a German-Canadian businessman, immigration agent, and member of the Legislative Assembly of Manitoba. He served as Speaker of the Legislature and as honorary consul of Germany to Winnipeg and the Northwest Territories. He was awarded the Order of the Red Eagle for his services to Germany.

== Early life ==
Hespeler was born as Wilhelm Hespeler in Baden-Baden, Grand Duchy of Baden, the son of Georg Johann and Anna Barbara (Wick) Hespeler. His mother was a granddaughter of Count Károly Andrássy de Csíkszentkirály et Krasznahorka (1723–1795), a Hungarian nobleman, and his father was a businessman with the house of Mayer Amschel Rothschild. Hespeler was educated at the Polytechnic Institute at Karlsruhe (likely what is now Karlsruhe Institute of Technology). He left school at the age of nineteen and emigrated to Canada with his mother in 1850, his father having died in 1840.

== Business career ==
Hespeler worked for his older brother Jacob Hespeler before becoming a partner in the firm of Hespeler and Randall, which ran both a distillery (which later became Seagram's) and a grain mill. He married a Canadian woman and became a naturalized British subject at some time before 1867, adopting the first name of "William". In 1870 he returned to Baden-Baden, serving briefly as a stretcher-bearer during the Franco-Prussian War before being hired by the Government of Canada as an immigration agent in 1871. While he was in Baden he heard that a number of Mennonite families in Russia were intending to immigrate to the United States. He reported back to his superiors in Canada, who sent him to Russia to persuade the Mennonites to choose Canada instead. Despite considerable opposition both from British and Russian authorities, he was able to arrange for thousands of Mennonites to immigrate. Most settled in the area around Winnipeg.

Impressed with his success, the Minister of Agriculture, John Henry Pope, appointed him Dominion Immigration and Agriculture Agent for Manitoba and the Northwest Territories. Hespeler moved to Winnipeg, residing in the suburb of Fort Rouge for the rest of his life. He arranged for further Mennonite immigration and also encouraged Icelandic immigrants and Jewish refugees from Germany and elsewhere to settle in Manitoba. During this time he combined his work for the government with his private business of grain merchant, but he also worked to ensure the welfare of new immigrants through the provision of emergency supplies and temporary shelter. He planned the town of Niverville, Manitoba and (with his son) erected the first grain elevator on the Canadian Prairies.

== Political career ==
Hespeler served as city alderman in Waterloo in 1863. In 1876 Hespeler was elected alderman for Winnipeg's South Ward and was appointed a Justice of the Peace and a member of the Council of Keewatin. In 1882 the German government appointed him honorary consul for Winnipeg and the Northwest Territories; in 1903 he was awarded the Order of the Red Eagle in thanks for twenty years of service to the German Empire.

Hespeler was elected to the Legislative Assembly of Manitoba in the 1899 general election as an independent for the rural riding of Rosenfeld. On March 29, 1900, he was elected Speaker of the Legislative Assembly, one of the first men not born a British subject to be appointed to this level of government in the British Empire. Despite his conservative leanings he did not support the government of Conservative premier Hugh John Macdonald. Redistribution eliminated the riding of Rosenfeld in 1903 and Hespeler chose not to run again. His retirement was marred during World War I by hostility from residents of Winnipeg arising from his German connections; he was opposed for attempting to assist German immigrants who had lost their jobs due to anti-German sentiment. After the war he found himself forgotten by the city and the province he had helped to populate.

== Legacy ==
Hespeler was married three times. After the death of his third wife in 1920, Hespeler moved to Vancouver to live with his son Alfred. He died the next year at the age of 90. Hespeler Avenue in Winnipeg's East Kildonan ward was named for William Hespeler. There are also Hespeler Roads in the RM of Stanley, Steinbach, Manitoba, the Rural Municipality of Hanover, Gretna and a Hespeler Park in Niverville that are also named after him.
