= William Albert Pommer =

Canadian politician

W. A. Pommer

Member of Parliament for Lisgar
- In office August 1953 – June 1957
- Preceded by: Howard Winkler
- Succeeded by: George Muir

Personal details
- Born: William Albert Pommer; 15 May 1895 Virden, Manitoba, Canada
- Died: 5 November 1971 (aged 76) Winnipeg, Manitoba, Canada
- Party: Liberal
- Spouse: Grace Raddick (m. 1921)
- Profession: Dentist

William Albert Pommer (15 May 1895 – 5 November 1971) was a Liberal party member of the House of Commons of Canada. He was born in Virden, Manitoba.

Pommer studied at Chicago's Northwestern University and the University of Toronto where he received his degree to practice dentistry. He participated in World War I with the Canadian Expeditionary Force's Dental Corps. Between 1932 and 1948 he was mayor of Manitou, Manitoba.

He was first elected to Parliament at the Lisgar riding in the 1953 general election. After serving in the 22nd Canadian Parliament, he was defeated in the 1957 election by George Muir of the Progressive Conservative party.

1953 Canadian federal election: Lisgar
| Party | Candidate | Votes |
|---|---|---|
| Liberal | William Albert Pommer | 6,581 |
| Progressive Conservative | William Henry Sharpe | 4,780 |
| Social Credit | Ivan Andrew Langtry | 3,096 |

1957 Canadian federal election: Lisgar
| Party | Candidate | Votes |
|---|---|---|
| Progressive Conservative | George Muir | 8,708 |
| Social Credit | Ivan Andrew Langtry | 5,246 |
| Liberal | William Albert Pommer | 4,390 |
| Co-operative Commonwealth | Howard Russell Pawley | 443 |
| Independent | Douglas George Gateson | 205 |
