= Ferris Bolton =

Canadian politician

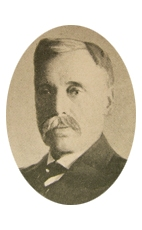

Member of the Canadian Parliament for Lisgar
- In office 1917–1921
- Preceded by: William Henry Sharpe
- Succeeded by: John Livingstone Brown

Personal details
- Born: 13 February 1853 Newboro, Canada West
- Died: 11 May 1937 (aged 84) Brandon, Manitoba
- Party: Unionist Party
- Occupation: farmer

Ferris Bolton (13 February 1853 – 11 May 1937) was a politician and farmer. He was elected to the House of Commons of Canada as a Member of the Unionist Party in the 1917 election to represent the riding of Lisgar. Prior to his federal political experience, he was reeve of South Dufferin and Pemble, Manitoba between 1880 and 1894 and reeve of Pembina, Manitoba between 1891 and 1894. Bolton was also Postmaster of Calf Mountain from 1881 to 1900, and postmaster at Darlingford from 1913 to 1917.

He married Jennie Stewart on 22 December 1880 with whom he had five sons, three of whom were killed in World War I, and two daughters. He was the son of John F. and May "Hannah" Bolton.

1917 Canadian federal election: Lisgar
Party	Candidate	Votes
Government (Unionist)	Ferris Bolton	3,834
Opposition (Laurier Liberals)	Ernest Wesley Quinn	613
