= Cornelius Wiebe =

Canadian politician

Cornelius W. Wiebe

Member of the Legislative Assembly of Manitoba for Morden and Rhineland
- In office June 16, 1932 – July 27, 1936
- Preceded by: Hugh McGavin
- Succeeded by: Wallace C. Miller

Personal details
- Born: February 18, 1893 Altona, Manitoba, Canada
- Died: July 12, 1999 (aged 106) Winkler, Manitoba, Canada
- Party: Manitoba Liberal Party

Cornelius W. Wiebe, CM (February 18, 1893 – July 12, 1999) was a Canadian physician and politician.

== Early life and education ==
Wiebe was born to a Mennonite family in Altona, Manitoba. He was educated at Wesley College, the University of Manitoba and the Manitoba Medical College, receiving his MD in 1925.

== Career ==
Wiebe practiced family medicine in Winkler, Manitoba from 1925 to 1978, and, according to local tradition, continued to practice on an informal basis after his retirement. Over the course of 53 years, he delivered over 6,000 babies.

A member of the Liberal Party, he was elected to the Legislative Assembly of Manitoba in the 1932 provincial election, defeating Conservative incumbent Hugh McGavin by 447 votes in the Morden and Rhineland constituency. A coalition of Liberals and Progressives won this election, and Wiebe served as a backbench supporter of John Bracken's coalition government for the next four years.

Wiebe was the first Mennonite to serve in the Manitoba legislature. He did not seek re-election in 1936. Though his own political career was brief, he remained a lifetime supporter of the merged Liberal-Progressive Party and its successor, the Manitoba Liberal Party.

Wiebe served as president of the Manitoba College of Physicians and Surgeons in 1945-46, and of the Manitoba Medical Association in 1952-53. He played a prominent role in establishing Winkler's Bethel Hospital in 1935, and the Valley Rehabilitation Centre in 1969. Along with four other doctors, he established the Winkler Medical Clinic in 1974. Wiebe also served on the Winkler school board from 1929 to 1953.

At age 105, Wiebe became the oldest person in Canadian history to be granted the Order of Canada. He died at Winkler in 1999, at age 106. The Manitoba legislature paid tribute to his life and held a moment of silence in his honour on December 13, 1999.

In 1983, Mavis Reimer published a biography entitled Cornelius W. Wiebe: A Beloved Physician. As of 1999, Reimer's work was still available through Mennonite Books in Manitoba.
