= Robert Lorne Richardson =

Canadian politician

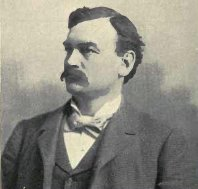

Member of the Canadian Parliament for Lisgar
- In office 1896–1902
- Preceded by: Arthur Wellington Ross
- Succeeded by: Duncan Alexander Stewart

Member of the Canadian Parliament for Springfield
- In office 1917–1921
- Preceded by: District created in 1914
- Succeeded by: Robert Hoey

Personal details
- Born: June 28, 1860 Balderson, Lanark County, Upper Canada
- Died: November 6, 1921 (aged 61) Winnipeg, Manitoba
- Party: Liberal (1896-1900); Independent (1900-1902); Unionist (Conservative and Liberal) (1917-1921)

Robert Lorne Richardson (June 28, 1860 – November 6, 1921) was a Canadian journalist, editor, newspaper owner, author, and politician. He was a central figure in the early decades of long-running rivalry battle between the Winnipeg Tribune and the Winnipeg Free Press, and in the development of Canadian syndicated news.

== Early life ==
Born in Balderson, Lanark County, Canada West, the son of Joseph Richardson and Harriet Thompson, Richardson was educated at the Balderson Public School.

== Journalist and author ==
In 1879 Richardson became a journalist working for the Montreal Star and briefly for the Toronto Globe.

He moved to Winnipeg in 1881 was the city editor for the Daily Sun until the paper stopped publishing in 1890.

In 1890, he founded with Duncan Lloyd McIntyre, a childhood friend, the Winnipeg Daily Tribune and served as its editor. Initially aligned with the Liberal party, the Tribune over time advocated for free trade, government-owned railways, and the abolition of separate schools, positions that ran directly opposite to official Liberal policies. He sold the Tribute in 1920, a year before his death.

He helped found the news service Western Associated Press in 1907 which was a forerunner of the Canadian Press.

He was also the author of two novels Colin of the ninth concession: a tale of pioneer life in eastern Ontario (Toronto, 1903) and The Camerons of Bruce (Toronto, 1906).

== Political career ==
Richardson was first elected to the House of Commons of Canada as the Liberal in the 1896 election that saw Sir Wilfrid Laurier elected prime minister for the first time. Elected as the MP for Lisgar, Richardson gained for the Liberals the only part in Manitoba that had not once returned a Liberal member since Manitoba joined Confederation in 1870. He was appointed a government whip but soon fell out of Liberal party line over the Manitoba Schools question and became an enemy of Laurier’s western lieutenant, interior minister Clifford Sifton (who he challenge as an independent in the 1904 election), who took ownership control of the rival Winnipeg Free Press in 1892.

Richardson was expelled from the Liberal caucus for his insubordination during his first term, but retained the seat in 1900 as an independent with the help of the Manitoba Conservatives, who backed him in return for the Tribune’s support. The support was not lasting however. When the Tribune denounced Conservative premier Rodmond Roblin over railway the following years, the Conservatives exposed the bribery and alcohol distribution to voters by Richardson’s agents, leading to his election being annulled by court. Richardson, though not found personally guilty of corrupted practice, was defeated in the resulting 1902 by-election.

In the 1904 election, Richardson went into the city of Brandon to challenge his nemesis Sifton, and went further west in 1908 to contest the electoral district of Assiniboia in the newly admitted province of Saskatchewan, this time as an independent conservative. He ran in the a by-election in October 1912 for Macdonald (Manitoba) as an independent Liberal but was not successful. The by-election was also declared void, but Richardson did not run the subsequent byelection in 1913.

He was elected MP for Springfield in the 1917 election as a supporter of Robert Borden's Unionist government. He died in Winnipeg on November 6, 1921, a month before the 1921 election.

== Electoral record ==
=== 1896, 1900, 1902: Lisgar, Manitoba ===
1896 Canadian federal election: Lisgar
| Party | Candidate | Votes |
|---|---|---|
| Liberal | Robert Lorne Richardson | 2,657 |
| Conservative | R. Rogers | 2,603 |

1900 Canadian federal election: Lisgar
| Party | Candidate | Votes |
|---|---|---|
| Independent | Robert Lorne Richardson | 3,392 |
| Liberal | Valentine Winkler | 3,143 |

Canadian federal by-election, 1902: Lisgar On Mr. Richardson's election being declared void, 20 July 1901
| Party | Candidate | Votes |
|---|---|---|
| Liberal | D.A. Stewart | 3,370 |
| Independent Liberal | Robert Lorne Richardson | 2,354 |
| Conservative | J.M. Toombs | 1,646 |

=== 1904: Brandon, Manitoba ===
1904 Canadian federal election: Brandon
| Party | Candidate | Votes |
|---|---|---|
| Liberal | Clifford Sifton | 3,625 |
| Independent | R.L. Richardson | 2,804 |

=== 1908: Assiniboia, Saskatchewan ===
1908 Canadian federal election: Assiniboia
| Party | Candidate | Votes |
|---|---|---|
| Liberal | John Gillanders Turriff | 4,048 |
| Independent Conservative | Robert Lorne Richardson | 3,542 |

=== 1912: Macdonald, Manitoba ===
Canadian federal by-election, 12 October 1912: Macdonald On Mr. Staples being appointed Grain Commissioner for Canada, 10 April 1912
| Party | Candidate | Votes |
|---|---|---|
| Conservative | MORRISON, Alexander | 3,534 |
| Liberal | RICHARDSON, R.L. | 2,740 |

=== 1917: Springfield, Manitoba ===
1917 Canadian federal election: Springfield
| Party | Candidate | Votes |
|---|---|---|
| Government (Unionist) | RICHARDSON, Robert Lorne | 5,870 |
| Opposition (Laurier Liberals) | CHARETTE, Guillaume Joseph | 3,781 |
