= Arthur Wellington Ross =

Canadian politician

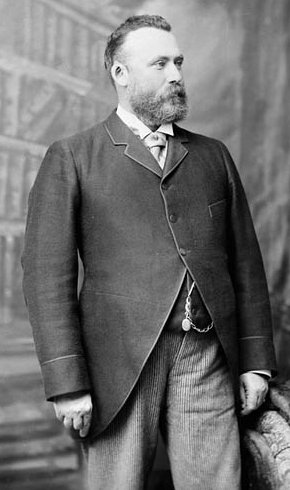

Member of the Canadian Parliament for Lisgar
- In office 1882–1896
- Preceded by: John Christian Schultz
- Succeeded by: Robert Lorne Richardson

Member of the Legislative Assembly of Manitoba for Springfield
- In office 1878–1882
- Preceded by: William Robert Dick
- Succeeded by: Charles Edie

Personal details
- Born: March 25, 1846 Nairn, Upper Canada
- Died: March 25, 1901 (aged 55) Toronto, Ontario
- Party: Liberal-Conservative
- Spouse: Jesse Flora Cattanach
- Children: 4

Arthur Wellington Ross (25 March 1846 – 25 March 1901) was a Canadian politician, educator and lawyer.

== Biography ==
Born in Nairn, Upper Canada, the son of Donald Ross, he studied at the Toronto Normal School and taught school in Cornwall, becoming headmaster for the local high school and then inspector of schools for Glengarry County. He continued his studies at the University of Toronto and then articled as an attorney and solicitor. In 1873, Ross married Jessie Flora Cattanach. He moved to Winnipeg in 1877, was admitted to the Manitoba bar in 1878 and set up practice with his brother in Winnipeg.

From 1878 to 1882, he was the Manitoba Liberal member of the Legislative Assembly of Manitoba for the electoral district of Springfield. From 1882 to 1896, he was the Liberal-Conservative member of the House of Commons of Canada for Lisgar.

Ross married Jesse Flora Cattanach and had four children: Dwight, Donald, Gertie, and John Hugo Ross. (John would die in the sinking of RMS Titanic in 1912 at the age of 36.)

Ross invested heavily in land and suffered heavy financial losses when land values crashed in 1882. In 1888, he entered the real estate business in Vancouver but returned to Winnipeg in 1891. After he retired from politics, he moved to Toronto, where he became involved in mining. Around 1899, he moved to Columbia Gardens in British Columbia near the gold mining area of Rossland. Ross suffered a stroke in 1901 and died from a second stroke after returning to Toronto for treatment.

1882 Canadian federal election: Lisgar
Party	Candidate	Votes
Liberal–Conservative	Arthur Wellington Ross	760
Unknown	John Christian Schultz	720

1887 Canadian federal election: Lisgar
Party	Candidate	Votes
Liberal–Conservative	Arthur Wellington Ross	acclaimed

1891 Canadian federal election: Lisgar
Party	Candidate	Votes
Liberal–Conservative	Arthur Wellington Ross	1,359
Liberal	John Taylor	1,169
