= Arnold Brown (politician) =

Canadian politician

Peter Arnold Brown

Member of the Legislative Assembly of Manitoba
- In office 1973–1988

Personal details
- Born: April 27, 1927 Winkler, Manitoba, Canada
- Died: March 5, 1994 (aged 66) Winkler, Manitoba, Canada
- Party: Progressive Conservative Party of Manitoba
- Occupation: Politician

Peter Arnold Brown (April 27, 1927 in Winkler, Manitoba – March 5, 1994) was a politician in Manitoba, Canada. He was a member of the Legislative Assembly of Manitoba from 1973 to 1988, representing the riding of Rhineland for the Progressive Conservative Party.

The son of Isaac J. Brown and Katherine Hamm, he was educated in Rosenbach and Winkler. In 1960, he married Katie Jansen. Brown worked as a businessman and a farmer before entering political life. He served as a councillor in the town of Winkler from 1967 to 1974, and was the first vice-president of the Manitoba Beet Growers Association for a time, as well as serving on several local boards.

Brown was first elected to the Manitoba legislature in the provincial election of 1973, defeating Social Credit Party leader and MLA Jacob Froese by about 1,400 votes (the Social Credit Party would never again elect an MLA in Manitoba). He was re-elected in the 1977 election, which the Tories won under Sterling Lyon; Brown, however, was not appointed to cabinet. He was re-elected in the elections of 1981 and 1986, and resigned in 1988 when his riding was eliminated through redistribution. He died in Winkler in 1994.
