= 184th Battalion, CEF =

Canadian First World War infantry unit

The 184th Battalion, CEF was a unit in the Canadian Expeditionary Force during the First World War. Based in Winnipeg, Manitoba, the unit began recruiting during the winter of 1915/16 in that city and in southern Manitoba. After sailing to England in November 1916, the battalion was absorbed into the 11th Reserve Battalion on November 11, 1916. The 184th Battalion, CEF had one Officer Commanding: Lieut-Col. W. H. Sharpe.
