= Jack Murta =

Canadian politician

The Honourable Jack Burnett Murta PC

Member of the Canadian Parliament for Lisgar
- In office 1970–1988
- Preceded by: George Muir
- Succeeded by: District was abolished in 1987

Personal details
- Born: May 13, 1943 (age 82) Carman, Manitoba, Canada
- Party: Progressive Conservative
- Cabinet: Minister of State (Multiculturalism) (1984-1985); Minister of State (Tourism) (1985-1986)
- Portfolio: Parliamentary Secretary to the President of the Treasury Board (1979)

Jack Burnett Murta, PC (born May 13, 1943) is a former Canadian politician.

Born in Carman, Manitoba, the son of John James Murta and Jean (Burnett) Murta, he graduated from the Diploma course in Agriculture at the University of Manitoba in 1964.

In 1970, he was elected to the House of Commons of Canada as a Progressive Conservative in a by-election for the riding of Lisgar following the death of the previous incumbent, George Muir. He was re-elected in 1972, 1974, 1979, 1980, and 1984.

He was Parliamentary Secretary to the President of the Treasury Board in the short lived government of Joe Clark in 1979. In the Brian Mulroney government he was Minister of State (Multiculturalism) from 1984 to 1985 and Minister of State (Tourism) from 1985 to 1986.

== Electoral record ==
By-election on 16 November 1970
Party	Candidate	Votes
Progressive Conservative	Jack Murta	11,222
Liberal	Ken R. Hanssen	4,444
New Democratic	Garry Enns	1,814
Social Credit	John L. Harms	1,730
Independent	George G. Elias	377

1972 Canadian federal election: Lisgar
Party	Candidate	Votes
Progressive Conservative	Jack Murta	17,253
Liberal	Richard Spink Bowles	4,469
New Democratic	John Bucklaschuk	1,627
Social Credit	John L. Harms	943

1974 Canadian federal election: Lisgar
Party	Candidate	Votes
Progressive Conservative	Jack Murta	16,465
Liberal	Norm Dashevsky	4,414
New Democratic	Frank Froese	1,278
Social Credit	Jacob Froese	1,164

1979 Canadian federal election: Lisgar
Party	Candidate	Votes
Progressive Conservative	Jack Murta	21,366
Liberal	Peter Cole	6,201
New Democratic	Keith W.D. Poulson	2,920

1980 Canadian federal election: Lisgar
Party	Candidate	Votes
Progressive Conservative	Jack Murta	18,029
Liberal	Peter Cole	7,016
New Democratic	Herman Rempel	3,353
Not affiliated	George G. Elias	396

1984 Canadian federal election: Lisgar
Party	Candidate	Votes
Progressive Conservative	Jack Murta	15,557
Confederation of Regions	James S. Fallis	8,976
Liberal	Anne-Marie McEarcern	4,423
New Democratic	Peter Hiebert	2,052
Rhinoceros	Uncle Bill Harrison	437
