= William Henry Sharpe =

Canadian politician

The Honourable William Henry Sharpe

Member of Parliament for Lisgar
- In office 1908–1916
- Preceded by: Thomas Greenway
- Succeeded by: Ferris Bolton

Canadian Senator from Manitoba
- In office 1916–1942
- Appointed by: Robert Laird Borden

Personal details
- Born: April 19, 1868 Scott Township, Ontario, Canada
- Died: April 19, 1942 (aged 74) Ottawa, Ontario, Canada
- Party: Conservative

Military service
- Allegiance: Canada
- Branch/service: Canadian Army
- Rank: Lieutenant Colonel
- Unit: 184th Battalion, CEF

William Henry Sharpe (April 19, 1868 – April 19, 1942) was a Canadian politician. He represented Lisgar as a member of Parliament (MP) in the House of Commons of Canada from 1908 to 1915 as a Conservative. Sharpe sat for Manitou division in the Senate of Canada from 1916 to 1942.

== Background ==
He was born in Scott Township, Ontario, the son of George Sharpe and Mary Ann Simpson, and was educated in Uxbridge and Belleville. He established himself as a merchant in Manitou, Manitoba. He was married twice: to Cora Alice Bustin in 1891 and to Ida J. Armstrong in 1900. Sharpe raised the 184th Battalion, CEF that served overseas during World War I, serving as lieutenant-colonel. He was a member of the city council for Manitou from 1901 to 1907 and was mayor in 1908. He resigned his seat in the House of Commons in 1915 to run unsuccessfully for a seat in the provincial assembly. He died in office in Ottawa at the age of 74.

His brother Samuel Simpson Sharpe also served in the House of Commons.

== Electoral record ==
1904 Canadian federal election: Lisgar
| Party | Candidate | Votes |
|---|---|---|
| Liberal | Thomas Greenway | 1,657 |
| Conservative | William Henry Sharpe | 1,477 |

1908 Canadian federal election: Lisgar
| Party | Candidate | Votes |
|---|---|---|
| Conservative | William Henry Sharpe | 1,765 |
| Liberal | John Franklin Greenway | 1,660 |

1911 Canadian federal election: Lisgar
| Party | Candidate | Votes |
|---|---|---|
| Conservative | William Henry Sharpe | 1,692 |
| Liberal | John Franklin Greenway | 1,672 |
