= John Livingstone Brown =

Canadian politician

Member of the Canadian Parliament for Lisgar
- In office 1921–1935
- Preceded by: Ferris Bolton
- Succeeded by: Howard Winkler

Personal details
- Born: February 7, 1867 Belwood, Canada West
- Died: March 20, 1953 (aged 86)
- Party: Progressive Party (1922-1926), Liberal-Progressive (1926-1935)
- Occupation: farmer, minister
- Website: John Livingstone Brown – Parliament of Canada biography

John Livingstone Brown (February 7, 1867 – March 20, 1953) was a Canadian politician, farmer and minister. He was elected to the House of Commons of Canada in the 1921 election as a Member of the Progressive Party. He moved to the Liberal-Progressives after the 1926 election and was re-elected in 1930.

== Electoral record ==
1921 Canadian federal election: Lisgar
Party	Candidate	Votes
Progressive	John Livingstone Brown	4,460
Conservative	Robert Rogers	3,296

1925 Canadian federal election: Lisgar
Party	Candidate	Votes
Progressive	John Livingstone Brown	3,112
Conservative	William James Rowe	2,736

1926 Canadian federal election: Lisgar
Party	Candidate	Votes
Liberal–Progressive	John Livingstone Brown	4,657
Conservative	William James Rowe	3,790

1930 Canadian federal election: Lisgar
Party	Candidate	Votes
Liberal–Progressive	John Livingstone Brown	5,162
Conservative	Robert Thomas Hewitt	4,990
