= Valentine Winkler =

Canadian politician (1864–1920)

Valentine Winkler (March 18, 1864 – June 7, 1920) was a politician in Manitoba, Canada. He served in the Legislative Assembly of Manitoba as a Liberal for Rhineland from 1892 to 1900, and again from 1900 to 1920. Winkler was a cabinet minister in the government of Tobias Norris. His brother, Enoch Winkler, was also a member of the provincial legislature from 1888 to 1899.

Winkler was born in Neustadt, Grey County, Canada West, and educated at public schools in the area. He moved to Manitoba in 1879 after the death of his father, and worked in his brother Enoch Winkler's lumberyard. In 1883, he began his own grain and lumber business in Morden. He began farming in 1888. After the incorporation of the Municipality of Stanley in 1890, Winkler was chosen as the community's first reeve. He served in this position until 1892. In the same year, the village of Winkler was established in Manitoba, named after him. He ran a grain elevator and lumber business in the community. Winkler was also an active freemason.

He was first elected to the Manitoba legislature in the 1892 provincial election, defeating Conservative candidate N. Bowman by 186 votes to 74 in the constituency of Rhineland. The Liberals won a majority government in this election, and Winkler served as a backbench supporter of Thomas Greenway's government. He was re-elected over Bowman by an increased margin in the 1896 campaign.

The Liberals were defeated in the 1899 provincial election, although Winkler retained his seat with a victory over Conservative candidate W.J. Potter. He resigned his seat in 1900 to run for the House of Commons of Canada in the 1900 federal election, as a candidate of the Liberal Party of Canada in the riding of Lisgar. He narrowly lost to independent candidate Robert Lorne Richardson, 3,392 votes to 3,143. Winkler's son later wrote that his father was not keen on entering federal politics, but ran at the behest of Clifford Sifton, a prominent cabinet minister from Manitoba.

Twelve days after the federal election, Winkler was narrowly re-elected in a by-election to serve Rhineland again in the provincial legislature. He defeated Bowman again, 185 votes to 174.

Winkler was re-elected by an increased margin in the 1903 provincial election, and again in the elections of 1907, 1910 and 1914. In 1914, he defeated future Lieutenant Governor of Manitoba William Johnston Tupper by 132 votes. The Conservative administration of Rodmond Roblin governed the province throughout this period, and Winkler served as a member of the opposition.

In 1915, Roblin was forced to resign from office after the Lieutenant Governor found his ministry guilty of corruption in the tendering of contracts for new legislative buildings. Although the Liberals did not command a majority in the legislature, they were called upon to form a new administration. Tobias Norris became Premier of Manitoba on May 15, 1915, and appointed Winkler as his Minister of Agriculture and Immigration.

A new election was called in 1915, which the Liberals won with a landslide majority. Winkler defeated Tupper a second time, and was retained as Agriculture and Immigration minister in Norris's government.

Winkler was an activist Minister of Agriculture. He passed the Settlers Animal Purchase Act, which allowed new settlers in Interlake to purchase cattle on credit, and the Seed Grain Act, allowing municipalities to purchase seed on credit. He was also responsible for Manitoba's Farm Implements Act and Producer Dealers Act.

Winkler died of diabetes while campaigning for re-election in the provincial campaign of 1920. It may be noted that insulin was not discovered until two years later.

Winkler's son, Howard Winkler, was a federal Liberal Member of Parliament from 1935 to 1953.

1900 Canadian federal election: Lisgar
Party	Candidate	Votes
Independent	Robert Lorne Richardson	3,392
Liberal	Valentine Winkler	3,143
