= Duncan Alexander Stewart =

Canadian politician (1850–1936)

Duncan Alexander Stewart (30 June 1850 – 18 December 1936) was a Scottish-born farmer and political figure in Manitoba, Canada. He represented Lisgar in the House of Commons of Canada from 1902 to 1904 as a Liberal.

He was born in Anchterarder, Perthshire, the son of John Stewart and Catherine Robertson, and was educated in Lanark County, in Carleton Place and at McGill College. In 1883, he married Marjorie Cameron McIntyre. Stewart was an inspector of schools for Manitoba and treasurer for Rock Lake County. Stewart died in the rural municipality of Louise in Manitoba at the age of 86.
