= Lisgar (electoral district) =

Former federal electoral district in Manitoba, Canada

Lisgar was a federal electoral district in Manitoba, Canada, that was represented in the House of Commons of Canada from 1871 to 1988. This riding was created following the admission of Manitoba into the Canadian Confederation in 1870.

It was abolished in 1987 when it was redistributed into Portage—Interlake, Brandon—Souris, Lisgar—Marquette and Provencher ridings.

== Election results ==
By-election: As a result of Manitoba joining Confederation, 15 July 1870

By-election on 2 March 1871
Party	Candidate	Votes
Conservative	John Christian Schultz	315
Unknown	Colin Inkster	65

1872 Canadian federal election
Party	Candidate	Votes
Conservative	John Christian Schultz	273
Unknown	Edward Hay	128
Source: Canadian Elections Database

1874 Canadian federal election
Party	Candidate	Votes
Conservative	John Christian Schultz	285
Unknown	Edward Hay	216
lop.parl.ca

1878 Canadian federal election
Party	Candidate	Votes
Conservative	John Christian Schultz	acclaimed

1882 Canadian federal election
Party	Candidate	Votes
Liberal–Conservative	Arthur Wellington Ross	760
Unknown	John Christian Schultz	720

1887 Canadian federal election
Party	Candidate	Votes
Liberal–Conservative	Arthur Wellington Ross	acclaimed

1891 Canadian federal election
Party	Candidate	Votes
Liberal–Conservative	Arthur Wellington Ross	1,359
Liberal	John Taylor	1,169

1896 Canadian federal election
Party	Candidate	Votes
Liberal	Robert Lorne Richardson	2,657
Conservative	R. Rogers	2,603

1900 Canadian federal election
Party	Candidate	Votes
Independent	Robert Lorne Richardson	3,392
Liberal	Valentine Winkler	3,143

By-election: On Mr. Richardson's election being declared void, 20 July 1901

By-election on 18 February 1902
Party	Candidate	Votes
Liberal	D.A. Stewart	3,370
Independent Liberal	Robert Lorne Richardson	2,354
Conservative	J.M. Toombs	1,646

1904 Canadian federal election
Party	Candidate	Votes
Liberal	Thomas Greenway	1,657
Conservative	William Henry Sharpe	1,477

1908 Canadian federal election
Party	Candidate	Votes
Conservative	William Henry Sharpe	1,765
Liberal	John Franklin Greenway	1,660

1911 Canadian federal election
Party	Candidate	Votes
Conservative	William Henry Sharpe	1,692
Liberal	John Franklin Greenway	1,672

1917 Canadian federal election
Party	Candidate	Votes
Government (Unionist)	Ferris Bolton	3,834
Opposition (Laurier Liberals)	Ernest Wesley Quinn	613

1921 Canadian federal election
Party	Candidate	Votes
Progressive	John Livingstone Brown	4,460
Conservative	Robert Rogers	3,296

1925 Canadian federal election
Party	Candidate	Votes
Progressive	John Livingstone Brown	3,112
Conservative	William James Rowe	2,736

1926 Canadian federal election
Party	Candidate	Votes
Liberal–Progressive	John Livingstone Brown	4,657
Conservative	William James Rowe	3,790

1930 Canadian federal election
Party	Candidate	Votes
Liberal–Progressive	John Livingstone Brown	5,162
Conservative	Robert Thomas Hewitt	4,990

1935 Canadian federal election
Party	Candidate	Votes
Liberal	Howard Winkler	4,973
Conservative	Wallace C. Miller	4,453
Reconstruction	Eva Nelson	767

1940 Canadian federal election
Party	Candidate	Votes
Liberal	Howard Winkler	5,221
National Government	Reginald Arthur Sprake Follett	2,433
Co-operative Commonwealth	David Leslie McBrien	1,160
New Democracy	Thomas Eldon McIntyre	685

1945 Canadian federal election
Party	Candidate	Votes
Liberal	Howard Winkler	4,552
Progressive Conservative	Wallace C. Miller	4,257
Co-operative Commonwealth	Edgar James Bailey	1,512

1949 Canadian federal election
Party	Candidate	Votes
Liberal	Howard Winkler	9,190
Progressive Conservative	Diedrich Heppner	5,684
Co-operative Commonwealth	Gordon Morris Atkins	1,470

1953 Canadian federal election
Party	Candidate	Votes
Liberal	William Albert Pommer	6,581
Progressive Conservative	William Henry Sharpe	4,780
Social Credit	Ivan Andrew Langtry	3,096

1957 Canadian federal election
Party	Candidate	Votes
Progressive Conservative	George Muir	8,708
Social Credit	Ivan Andrew Langtry	5,246
Liberal	William Albert Pommer	4,390
Co-operative Commonwealth	Howard Russell Pawley	443
Independent	Douglas George Gateson	205

1958 Canadian federal election
Party	Candidate	Votes
Progressive Conservative	George Muir	13,072
Liberal	Kenneth C. Hartwell	4,546
Social Credit	Wilfred Darling	1,445
Co-operative Commonwealth	Joseph Albert Hamilton	520

1962 Canadian federal election
Party	Candidate	Votes
Progressive Conservative	George Muir	9,352
Liberal	Kenneth C. Hartwell	5,394
Social Credit	Roger H. Poiron	3,492
New Democratic	Sidney E. Varcoe	449

1963 Canadian federal election
Party	Candidate	Votes
Progressive Conservative	George Muir	9,698
Liberal	Jack Wilton	5,167
Social Credit	George Loeppky	4,099
New Democratic	Magnus Eliason	416

1965 Canadian federal election
Party	Candidate	Votes
Progressive Conservative	George Muir	8,988
Liberal	Fred Westwood	4,925
Social Credit	George Loeppky	2,711
New Democratic	Edith Alsop	619
Independent	George G. Elias	237

1968 Canadian federal election
Party	Candidate	Votes
Progressive Conservative	George Muir	11,785
Liberal	Donald A. Livingston	7,748
Social Credit	Roy E. Esler	1,350
New Democratic	Edith Alsop	1,305
Independent	George G. Elias	614

By-election: On Mr. Muir's death, 26 August 1970

By-election on 16 November 1970
Party	Candidate	Votes
Progressive Conservative	Jack Murta	11,222
Liberal	Ken R. Hanssen	4,444
New Democratic	Garry Enns	1,814
Social Credit	John L. Harms	1,730
Independent	George G. Elias	377

1972 Canadian federal election
Party	Candidate	Votes
Progressive Conservative	Jack Murta	17,253
Liberal	Richard Spink Bowles	4,469
New Democratic	John Bucklaschuk	1,627
Social Credit	John L. Harms	943

1974 Canadian federal election
Party	Candidate	Votes
Progressive Conservative	Jack Murta	16,465
Liberal	Norm Dashevsky	4,414
New Democratic	Frank Froese	1,278
Social Credit	Jacob Froese	1,164

1979 Canadian federal election
Party	Candidate	Votes
Progressive Conservative	Jack Murta	21,366
Liberal	Peter Cole	6,201
New Democratic	Keith W.D. Poulson	2,920

1980 Canadian federal election
Party	Candidate	Votes
Progressive Conservative	Jack Murta	18,029
Liberal	Peter Cole	7,016
New Democratic	Herman Rempel	3,353
Not affiliated	George G. Elias	396

1984 Canadian federal election
Party	Candidate	Votes
Progressive Conservative	Jack Murta	15,557
Confederation of Regions	James S. Fallis	8,976
Liberal	Anne-Marie McEarcern	4,423
New Democratic	Peter Hiebert	2,052
Rhinoceros	Uncle Bill Harrison	437

== See also ==
- List of Canadian electoral districts
- Historical federal electoral districts of Canada
