= Wallace C. Miller =

Canadian politician (1896–1959)

16th Speaker of the Legislative Assembly of Manitoba
- In office February 14, 1950 – August 15, 1950
- Preceded by: Robert Hawkins
- Succeeded by: Nicholas Bachynsky

Member of the Legislative Assembly of Manitoba for Rineland
- In office November 10, 1949 – October 4, 1959
- Preceded by: Riding established
- Succeeded by: Jacob Froese

Member of the Legislative Assembly of Manitoba for Morden and Rhineland
- In office July 27, 1936 – November 10, 1949
- Preceded by: Cornelius Wiebe
- Succeeded by: Riding abolished

Personal details
- Born: Wallace Conrad Miller; February 7, 1896 Waterloo County, Ontario, Canada
- Died: October 4, 1959 (aged 63)
- Party: Liberal-Progressive
- Occupation: real estate agent and notary public
- Profession: Justice of the Peace, police magistrate

Wallace Conrad Miller (February 7, 1896 – October 4, 1959) was a Canadian politician who served in the Legislative Assembly of Manitoba from 1936 to 1959, and was a cabinet minister in the government of Douglas L. Campbell.

Born in Waterloo County, Ontario, Miller was educated at schools in Ontario and Manitoba, and also in Germany and France. He worked as a real estate agent and Notary Public. He enlisted in the Canadian Expeditionary Force in 1916, and served in France during World War I. Twice wounded, he returned home for medical reasons in June 1918. From 1926 to 1936, Miller served as chair of the Gretna School Board. He was a director of the Manitoba Trustees Association from 1932 to 1940, and was its president in 1939–40. He was also a police magistrate from 1926 to 1928, and a Justice of the Peace from 1932 to 1936.

Miller ran for the House of Commons of Canada for the Conservative Party in the 1935 federal election, but lost to Howard Winkler of the Liberal Party by 520 votes, in the riding of Lisgar.

He was first elected to the Manitoba legislature in the 1936 provincial election. A Conservative, he defeated Liberal-Progressive J.J. Enns by 358 votes in the constituency of Morden and Rhineland.

In 1940, the governing Liberal-Progressives formed an all-party coalition government with the Conservatives, CCF and Social Credit. Miller was re-elected in the 1941 election as a coalition Conservative, defeating three other pro-coalition candidates.

In early 1945, Miller resigned his seat to run for the Canadian House of Commons in the 1945 federal election. He again lost to Howard Winkler, this time by 295 votes.

The Morden & Rhineland seat had not been filled by the time of the 1945 provincial election, which allowed Miller to declare his candidacy for the constituency again. Still running as a coalition Conservative, he defeated coalition Liberal-Progressive J.R. Walkof by a narrow margin. In the 1949 provincial election, he was returned without opposition for the redistributed constituency of Rhineland.

When Douglas Campbell became Premier on December 14, 1948, he appointed Miller as his Provincial Secretary. Miller retained this position until February 14, 1950, when he resigned to become Speaker of the Assembly.

The Progressive Conservative Party left the coalition government in the summer of 1950, to sit on the opposition benches. Though he had been known as a strongly partisan MLA, Miller opposed this opposition and left the Progressive Conservatives to sit with the Liberal-Progressives. He resigned as Speaker on August 15, 1950, and was re-appointed to cabinet the following day as Minister of Education.

Miller was easily re-elected as a Liberal-Progressive in the 1953 election, defeating his Social Credit and Progressive Conservative opponents by a significant margin. He was again returned in the 1958 election, which saw the defeat of the Campbell government as Dufferin Roblin's Progressive Conservatives were able to form a minority administration. Miller formally resigned his cabinet position on June 30, 1958.

Miller was re-elected in the 1959 provincial election, defeating Progressive Conservative Leo Reckseidler by the reduced margin of 186 votes. He died later in the year.

Notwithstanding their name, Manitoba's Liberal-Progressives were to the right of the Progressive Conservatives, and governed the province in a conservative manner. Miller was a conservative figure in the Education portfolio, and regularly opposed calls for expanded school board areas. In 1956, he rejected outright a proposal for student loans.

Miller was considered to be one of the most dramatic speakers in the legislature, and regularly sparred with CCF leader Lloyd Stinson.

A school was named in his honour in the town of Altona, Manitoba, called W.C. Miller Collegiate.

1935 Canadian federal election: Lisgar
Party	Candidate	Votes
Liberal	Howard Winkler	4,973
Conservative	Wallace C. Miller	4,453
Reconstruction	Eva Nelson	767
