= Walter Clark (Canadian politician) =

Canadian politician

Walter Ernest Clark (July 17, 1890 – March 26, 1987) was a politician in Manitoba, Canada. He served in the Legislative Assembly of Manitoba from 1955 to 1958 as a Liberal-Progressive. He was 54 years old at the time of his election, and was a farmer and former municipal official in Baldur.

The son of John and Hanna Clark, he farmed and lived in the Rosehill district near Baldur, moving to the town in 1945 but continued to farm until the 1970s. In 1912, Clark married Teresa Caroline Porter. He was reeve of the Rural Municipality of Argyle for 18 years.

Clark was elected to the Manitoba legislature in a by-election called in the Mountain constituency after the resignation of high-profile cabinet minister Ivan Schultz. He defeated Progressive Conservative Marcel Boulic by 276 votes, and served for the next three years as a backbench supporter of Douglas Campbell's government. Many Liberal-Progressives were concerned with Clark's relatively narrow margin of victory, as Mountain had previously been considered one of the party's safest seats. Clark received support from the constituency's Anglo-Saxon majority and large Flemish population, while Boulic did well among French Canadians, who made up one third of the electorate.

The Liberal-Progressives were defeated in the 1958 provincial election, and Clark lost to Progressive Conservative Abram Harrison by 238 votes in the redistributed constituency of Rock Lake. He tried to return to the legislature in the 1959 provincial election, but lost to Harrison by an increased margin.

He died in Baldur in 1987.

== Electoral record ==
Manitoba provincial by-election, June 27, 1955: Mountain
Party	Candidate	Votes	%	±%
Liberal–Progressive	Walter Clark	1,846	51.04	−7.83
Progressive Conservative	Marcel Boulic	1,570	43.41	
Social Credit	Roger Poiron	201	5.56	
Total valid votes		3,617		
