= Jacob Hespeler =

German-Canadian businessman

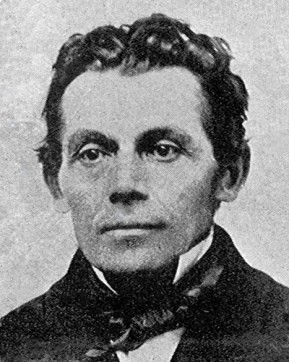
- Born: Jakob Georg Hespeler; 28 January 1811; Eningen unter Achalm, Kingdom of Württemberg
- Died: 22 March 1881 (aged 70); Hespeler, Ontario, Canada
- Burial place: New Hope Cemetery, Hespeler, Ontario
- Children: Laura
- Parents: Johann Georg Hespeler (father); Anna Barbara Wick (mother)

Jacob George Hespeler (né Jakob Georg Hespeler; 28 January 1811 – 22 March 1881) was a German-Canadian businessman. He is best known as the founder and namesake of the town Hespeler, Ontario, which since 1973 has been a neighbourhood in the amalgamated town of Cambridge, Ontario.

== Early life ==
Born Jakob Hespeler in Ehningen in the Kingdom of Württemberg, Hespeler was the eldest son of Johann Georg Hespeler (born 1784) and Anna Barbara Wick (1791–1881). His father was a businessman with the house of Mayer Amschel Rothschild. His younger brother was William Hespeler.

Hespeler received his education in Nancy and moved to North America where he worked in the fur trade for several years, working first for John Jacob Astor in Chicago and then with the Hudson's Bay Company.

== Business activities in Preston ==
Around 1835 Hespeler settled in Preston, Upper Canada (now part of Cambridge, Ontario), which was then a major German-speaking centre and a focus for German-speaking immigrants from both Europe and Pennsylvania.

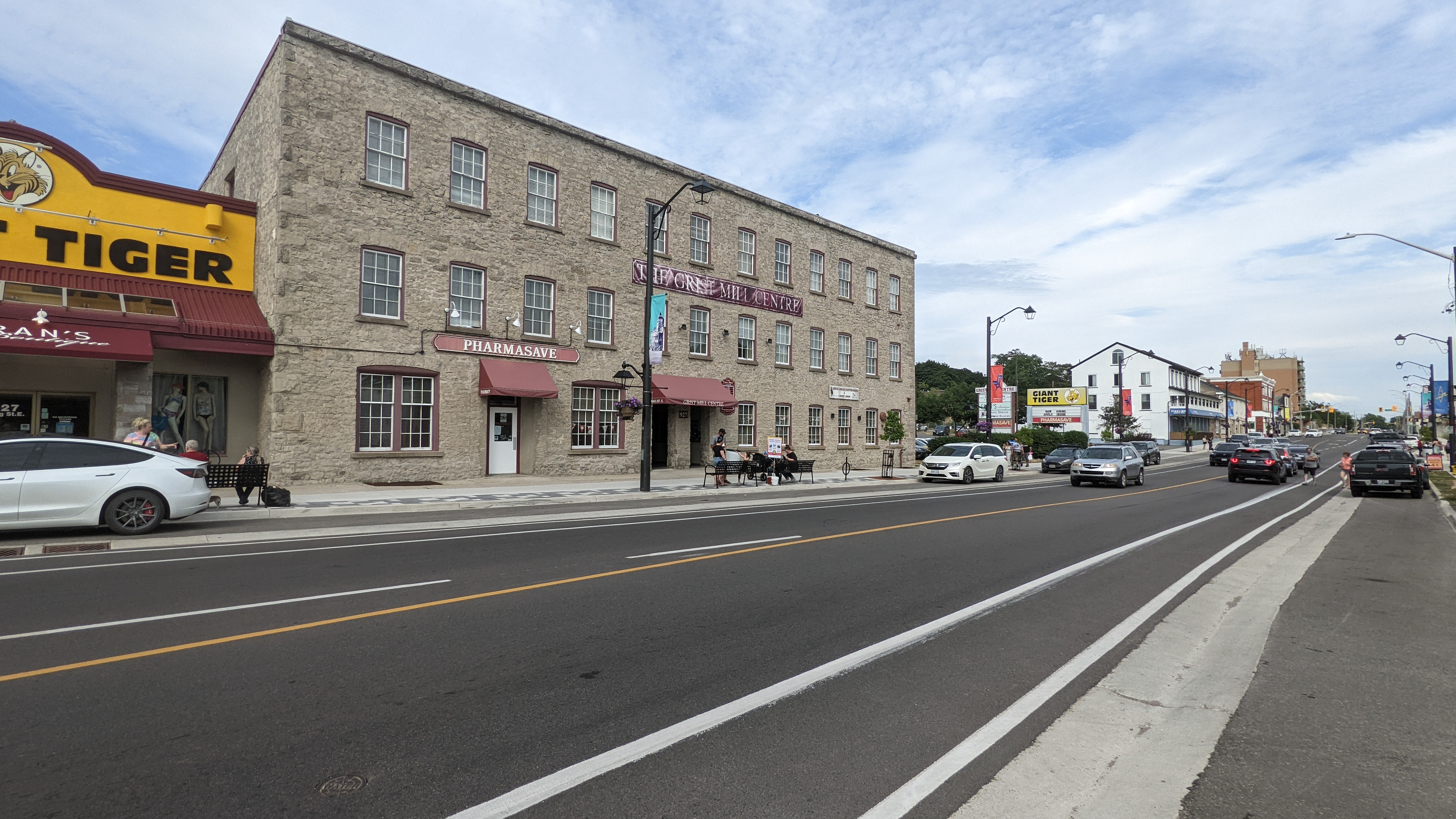
Hespeler's Grist Mill

Hespeler began as a co-owner of a store, which he soon owned outright, and then expanded his business operations in town. He purchased a site along the Grand River intending to build a mill which would compete with the existing mill owned by the Erb family. After beginning the digging of the millrace, he was forced to abandon the project as he could not secure the necessary water rights from the Erbs. He instead bought up some land on King Street in Preston and built a grist mill, general store, and distillery. He held a number of public positions in Preston, serving as reeve, postmaster, and town councillor.

== Development of New Hope / Hespeler ==
Beginning on February 6, 1845, Hespeler made a series of purchases of land on the west bank of the Speed River northeast of Preston, near a small settlement called New Hope, further removed from competition with the Erbs. He greatly enlarged the existing dam on the Speed, and within the next five years erected a gristmill, a sawmill, a cooperage, and a distillery. He also built stone lodgings for single men working in his buildings, and made significant donations to both the local Catholic and Lutheran churches.

His distillery was unusual in Canada at the time in making use of the "German method" for producing vinegar, which allowed vinegar to be fermented through a chemical process much faster than traditional methods. In 1851 Hespeler sent a vinegar sample to The Great Exhibition in Hyde Park and subsequently began exporting vinegar to Britain regularly.

In 1857 he organized a census of New Hope with the aim of seeing it incorporated, and the settlement of New Hope was proclaimed the "Village of Hespeler" in his honour effective January 1, 1859. He was elected as the first reeve of the village, serving from 1859 to 1862.

== Later years ==
In 1861 Hespeler ran for election to the 7th Parliament of the Province of Canada as the Conservative candidate for South Waterloo, but was defeated by the Liberal James Cowan.

Around 1861 he sold his properties in Preston and erected a large stone wool mill in Hespeler near the Speed River. After this mill was severely burned in 1869, Hespeler retired to California for several years before returning to Hespeler, where he died in 1881. He was buried at the New Hope Cemetery in Hespeler.

One of his younger brothers, William, became a prominent Manitoba politician. His daughter Laura married John Walker, a prominent industrialist who served as a member of the House of Commons.

A high school has been named in his honour, Jacob Hespeler Secondary School in Cambridge, Ontario.

== See also ==
- List of German Canadians
