= Enoch Winkler =

Canadian politician

Member of the Legislative Assembly of Manitoba for Rosenfeldt
- In office 1888–1899
- Preceded by: None - new district
- Succeeded by: William Hespeler

Personal details
- Born: January 2, 1852 Waterloo County, Canada West
- Died: 1 November 1928 (aged 76) Winnipeg, Manitoba
- Resting place: Elmwood Cemetery
- Party: Liberal
- Spouse: Helen Stewart
- Relations: Valentine Winkler - brother
- Children: Hal Winkler
- Occupation: farmer, merchant

Enoch Winkler (January 2, 1852 – November 1, 1928) was a farmer, merchant and political figure in Manitoba. He represented Rosenfeldt from 1888 to 1899 in the Legislative Assembly of Manitoba as a Liberal.

He was born in Waterloo County, Canada West, the son of David J. Winkler and the brother of Valentine Winkler. Winkler came west in 1874, working as a translator for a group of Plautdietsch speaking Mennonites emigrating to Manitoba. In 1875, he moved to Emerson, where he set up a lumber business. He later settled in Gretna. In 1878, he married Helen Stewart. Winkler was reeve for the Rural Municipality of Rhineland and served as mayor of Gretna from 1898 to 1899 and in 1901. He was defeated when he ran for reelection to the Manitoba assembly in 1899.

Winkler moved to California around 1908 but returned to Winnipeg a year and a half later. He died at home in Winnipeg at the age of 76.

Winkler's former home in Gretna has been designated as a Municipal Heritage Site by the province of Manitoba.

He was the father of ice hockey goaltender Hal Winkler.
