= George Muir (politician) =

Canadian politician

George Robson Muir
- Official 1968 portrait

Member of Parliament for Lisgar
- In office June 1957 – August 1970
- Preceded by: William Albert Pommer
- Succeeded by: Jack Murta

Personal details
- Born: 1 May 1903 Margaret, Manitoba
- Died: 26 August 1970 (aged 67) Roland, Manitoba
- Party: Progressive Conservative
- Spouse: Emily Louise Lewarton
- Profession: farmer, seed grower

George Robson Muir (1 May 1903 – 26 August 1970) was a Canadian farmer and politician. Muir served as a Progressive Conservative party member of the House of Commons of Canada. He was born in Margaret, Manitoba and became a farmer and seed grower by career.

He was first elected at the Lisgar riding in the 1957 general election, then was re-elected there in 1958, 1962, 1963, 1965 and 1968. However, Muir died in office on 26 August 1970 before completing his term in the 28th Canadian Parliament.

Muir died at his Roland, Manitoba home on 26 August 1970 aged 67.

== Electoral record ==
1957 Canadian federal election: Lisgar
Party	Candidate	Votes
Progressive Conservative	George Muir	8,708
Social Credit	Ivan Andrew Langtry	5,246
Liberal	William Albert Pommer	4,390
Co-operative Commonwealth	Howard Russell Pawley	443
Independent	Douglas George Gateson	205

1958 Canadian federal election: Lisgar
Party	Candidate	Votes
Progressive Conservative	George Muir	13,072
Liberal	Kenneth C. Hartwell	4,546
Social Credit	Wilfred Darling	1,445
Co-operative Commonwealth	Joseph Albert Hamilton	520

1962 Canadian federal election: Lisgar
Party	Candidate	Votes
Progressive Conservative	George Muir	9,352
Liberal	Kenneth C. Hartwell	5,394
Social Credit	Roger H. Poiron	3,492
New Democratic	Sidney E. Varcoe	449

1963 Canadian federal election: Lisgar
Party	Candidate	Votes
Progressive Conservative	George Muir	9,698
Liberal	Jack Wilton	5,167
Social Credit	George Loeppky	4,099
New Democratic	Magnus Eliason	416

1965 Canadian federal election: Lisgar
Party	Candidate	Votes
Progressive Conservative	George Muir	8,988
Liberal	Fred Westwood	4,925
Social Credit	George Loeppky	2,711
New Democratic	Edith Alsop	619
Independent	George G. Elias	237

1968 Canadian federal election: Lisgar
Party	Candidate	Votes
Progressive Conservative	George Muir	11,785
Liberal	Donald A. Livingston	7,748
Social Credit	Roy E. Esler	1,350
New Democratic	Edith Alsop	1,305
Independent	George G. Elias	614
