= Rhineland (electoral district) =

Defunct provincial electoral district in Manitoba, Canada

Rhineland is a former provincial electoral district of Manitoba, Canada. It was created by redistribution in 1892, and eliminated in 1914, when it merged into the new riding of Morden and Rhineland. It was re-established in 1949, and eliminated again in 1989. As its name implies, Rhineland was home to several German settlers, many of whom were Mennonites. It is named after the Rhineland region of Germany.

Jacob Froese, the last Social Credit MLA in Manitoba history, represented this riding from 1959 until 1973.

Rhineland's territory was integrated into the riding of Emerson in 1989.

== Members of the Legislative Assembly ==
Name	Party	Took office	Left office
Valentine Winkler	Lib	1892	1914
Wallace C. Miller	PC	1949	1950
	Lib-Prog	1950	1959
Jacob Froese	Social Credit	1959	1973
Arnold Brown	PC	1973	1988
Jack Penner	PC	1988	1990

== Election results ==
Manitoba provincial by-election, November 26, 1959
Party	Candidate	Votes	%
Social Credit	Jacob Froese	1,300	36.27
Progressive Conservative	Leo Recksiedler	1,209	33.73
Liberal–Progressive	David K. Friesen	1,075	29.99
Total valid votes		3,584	100
Rejected and discarded votes		15	
Turnout		3,599	60.61
Electors on the lists		5,938	

== See also ==
- List of Manitoba provincial electoral districts
- Canadian provincial electoral districts
