= List of Manitoba by-elections =

The list of Manitoba by-elections includes every provincial by-election held in the Canadian province of Manitoba. By-elections occur whenever there is a vacancy in the Legislative Assembly, although an imminent general election may allow the vacancy to remain until the dissolution of parliament.

== Causes ==
A by-election occurs whenever there is a vacancy in the Manitoba Legislature. Vacancies can occur for the following reasons:

- Death of a member
- Resignation of a member
- Voided results
- Expulsion from the legislature
- Ineligibility to sit
- Appointment to the Legislative Council, the appointed upper house of Manitoba, which was abolished in 1876.
- Appointment to the Cabinet.
  - Incumbent members were required to recontest their seats upon being appointed to Cabinet; these ministerial by-elections were almost always uncontested. This requirement was first enacted in 1872 and took effect at the 1874 general election. The requirement was clarified in 1875 to exempt ministers who resigned their offices and, within a month, accepted a new office. In 1924, members from Winnipeg—a 10-member constituency at the time—were exempted from having to seek re-election. In 1927, the remaining members were exempted from seeking reelection if they were appointed within one year of a general election. The requirement was abolished completely in 1937.

== 40th–43rd Legislatures (2011–present) ==
43rd Legislative Assembly (2023–present)
By-election	Date	Incumbent	Party	Winner	Party	Cause	Retained
The Pas-Kameesak	July 21, 2026	Amanda Lathlin	New Democratic	Jennifer Flett	New Democratic	Death	Yes
Spruce Woods	August 26, 2025	Grant Jackson	Progressive Conservative	Colleen Robbins	Progressive Conservative	Resignation to run in the 2025 federal election	Yes
Transcona	March 18, 2025	Nello Altomare	New Democratic	Shannon Corbett	New Democratic	Death	Yes
Tuxedo	June 18, 2024	Heather Stefanson	Progressive Conservative	Carla Compton	New Democratic	Resignation	No
Further information: 2023 Manitoba general election and 43rd Manitoba Legislature

42nd Legislative Assembly (2019–2023)
By-election	Date	Incumbent	Party	Winner	Party	Cause	Retained
Kirkfield Park	December 13, 2022	Scott Fielding	Progressive Conservative	Kevin Klein	Progressive Conservative	Resignation	Yes
Thompson	June 7, 2022	Danielle Adams	New Democratic	Eric Redhead	New Democratic	Death (traffic accident)	Yes
Fort Whyte	March 22, 2022	Brian Pallister	Progressive Conservative	Obby Khan	Progressive Conservative	Resignation	Yes
Further information: 2019 Manitoba general election and 42nd Manitoba Legislature

41st Legislative Assembly (2016–19)
By-election	Date	Incumbent	Party	Winner	Party	Cause	Retained
St. Boniface	July 17, 2018	Greg Selinger	New Democratic	Dougald Lamont	Liberal	Resignation	No
Point Douglas	June 13, 2017	Kevin Chief	New Democratic	Bernadette Smith	New Democratic	Resignation (family reasons)	Yes
Further information: 2016 Manitoba general election and 41st Manitoba Legislature

40th Legislative Assembly (2011–16)
By-election	Date	Incumbent	Party	Winner	Party	Cause	Retained
The Pas	April 22, 2015	Frank Whitehead	New Democratic	Amanda Lathlin	New Democratic	Resignation (health reasons)	Yes
Morris	January 28, 2014	Mavis Taillieu	Progressive Conservative	Shannon Martin	Progressive Conservative	Resignation	Yes
Arthur-Virden	January 28, 2014	Larry Maguire	Progressive Conservative	Doyle Piwniuk	Progressive Conservative	Resignation to contest a federal by-election	Yes
Fort Whyte	September 4, 2012	Hugh McFadyen	Progressive Conservative	Brian Pallister	Progressive Conservative	Resignation	Yes
Further information: 2011 Manitoba general election and 40th Manitoba Legislature

== 30th–39th Legislatures (1973–2011) ==
39th Legislative Assembly (2007–11)
By-election	Date	Incumbent	Party	Winner	Party	Cause	Retained
Concordia	March 2, 2010	Gary Doer	New Democratic	Matt Wiebe	New Democratic	Resignation to become Ambassador to the United States	Yes
The Pas	March 24, 2009	Oscar Lathlin	New Democratic	Frank Whitehead	New Democratic	Death	Yes
Elmwood	March 24, 2009	Jim Maloway	New Democratic	Bill Blaikie	New Democratic	Resignation to run federally	Yes

38th Legislative Assembly (2003–07)
By-election	Date	Incumbent	Party	Winner	Party	Cause	Retained
Fort Whyte	December 16, 2005	John Loewen	Progressive Conservative	Hugh McFadyen	Progressive Conservative	Resignation to run federally	Yes
Turtle Mountain	July 2, 2004	Merv Tweed	Progressive Conservative	Cliff Cullen	Progressive Conservative	Resignation to run federally	Yes
Minto	June 22, 2004	MaryAnn Mihychuk	New Democratic	Andrew Swan	New Democratic	Resignation to run for Mayor of Winnipeg	Yes

37th Legislative Assembly (1999–2003)
By-election	Date	Incumbent	Party	Winner	Party	Cause	Retained
Lac du Bonnet	March 12, 2002	Darren Praznik	Progressive Conservative	Gerald Hawranik	Progressive Conservative	Resignation	Yes
Tuxedo	November 21, 2000	Gary Filmon	Progressive Conservative	Heather Stefanson	Progressive Conservative	Resignation	Yes
Kirkfield Park	November 21, 2000	Eric Stefanson	Progressive Conservative	Stuart Murray	Progressive Conservative	Resignation to provide a seat for Murray	Yes

36th Legislative Assembly (1995–99)
By-election	Date	Incumbent	Party	Winner	Party	Cause	Retained
Charleswood	April 28, 1998	Jim Ernst	Progressive Conservative	Myrna Driedger	Progressive Conservative	Resignation	Yes
Portage la Prairie	September 30, 1997	Brian Pallister	Progressive Conservative	David Faurschou	Progressive Conservative	Resignation to run federally	Yes

35th Legislative Assembly (1990–95)
By-election	Date	Incumbent	Party	Winner	Party	Cause	Retained
The Maples	September 21, 1993	Gulzar Cheema	Liberal	Gary Kowalski	Liberal	Resignation	Yes
St. Johns	September 21, 1993	Judy Wasylycia-Leis	New Democratic	Gord Mackintosh	New Democratic	Resignation to run federally	Yes
Rupertsland	September 21, 1993	Elijah Harper	New Democratic	Eric Robinson	New Democratic	Resignation	Yes
Rossmere	September 21, 1993	Harold Neufeld	Progressive Conservative	Harry Schellenberg	New Democratic	Resignation	No
Osborne	September 21, 1993	Reg Alcock	Liberal	Norma McCormick	Liberal	Resignation to run federally	Yes
Portage la Prairie	September 15, 1992	Edward Connery	Progressive Conservative	Brian Pallister	Progressive Conservative	Resignation	Yes
Crescentwood	September 15, 1992	Jim Carr	Liberal	Avis Gray	Liberal	Resignation	Yes

34th (1988–90) and 33rd (1986–88) Legislative Assembly
By-election	Date	Incumbent	Party	Winner	Party	Cause	Retained
No by-elections	N/A	N/A	N/A	N/A	N/A	N/A	N/A

32nd Legislative Assembly (1981–86)
By-election	Date	Incumbent	Party	Winner	Party	Cause	Retained
Kildonan	October 1, 1985	Mary Beth Dolin	New Democratic	Marty Dolin	New Democratic	Death	Yes
Fort Garry	October 2, 1984	Bud Sherman	Progressive Conservative	Charles Birt	Progressive Conservative	Resignation to run federally	Yes

31st Legislative Assembly (1977–81)
By-election	Date	Incumbent	Party	Winner	Party	Cause	Retained
Rossmere	October 16, 1979	Edward Schreyer	New Democratic	Vic Schroeder	New Democratic	Appointed Governor-General of Canada	Yes
River Heights	October 16, 1979	Sidney Spivak	Progressive Conservative	Gary Filmon	Progressive Conservative	Resignation to run federally	Yes
Fort Rouge	October 16, 1979	Lloyd Axworthy	Liberal	June Westbury	Liberal	Resignation to run federally	Yes

30th Legislative Assembly (1973–77)
By-election	Date	Incumbent	Party	Winner	Party	Cause	Retained
Souris-Killarney	November 7, 1976	Earl McKellar	Progressive Conservative	Sterling Lyon	Progressive Conservative	Death	Yes
Wolseley	June 25, 1975	Israel Asper	Liberal	Robert Wilson	Progressive Conservative	Resignation	No
Crescentwood	June 25, 1975	Harvey Patterson	New Democratic	Warren Steen	Progressive Conservative	Void Election	No
St. Boniface	December 20, 1974	J. Paul Marion	Liberal	Laurent Desjardins	New Democratic	Void Election	No

== 20th–29th Legislatures (1936–73) ==
29th Legislative Assembly (1969–73)
By-election	Date	Incumbent	Party	Winner	Party	Cause	Retained
Wolseley	June 16, 1972	Leonard Claydon	Progressive Conservative	Israel Asper	Liberal	Death	No
Minnedosa	November 16, 1971	Walter Weir	Progressive Conservative	Dave Blake	Progressive Conservative	Resignation	Yes
Ste. Rose	April 5, 1971	Gildas Molgat	Liberal	Aime Adam	New Democratic	Appointed to the Senate	No
St. Vital	April 5, 1971	Jack Hardy	Progressive Conservative	Jim Walding	New Democratic	Resignation	No

28th Legislative Assembly (1966–69)
By-election	Date	Incumbent	Party	Winner	Party	Cause	Retained
Wolseley	February 20, 1969	Dufferin Roblin	Progressive Conservative	Leonard Claydon	Progressive Conservative	Resignation to run federally	Yes
Morris	February 20, 1969	Harry Shewman	Progressive Conservative	Warner Jorgenson	Progressive Conservative	Death	Yes
Churchill	February 20, 1969	Gordon Beard	Independent (Note: Beard was a former Progressive Conservative)	Joseph Borowski	New Democratic	Resignation	No
Birtle-Russell	February 20, 1969	Rod Clement	Liberal	Harry Graham	Progressive Conservative	Resignation to run federally	No
Turtle Mountain	March 4, 1968	Edward Dow	Liberal	Edward Dow	Liberal	Void Election	Yes

27th Legislative Assembly (1962–66)
By-election	Date	Incumbent	Party	Winner	Party	Cause	Retained
River Heights	September 30, 1964	Maitland Steinkopf	Progressive Conservative	Maitland Steinkopf	Progressive Conservative	Resignation to recontest over land assembly payment	Yes

26th Legislative Assembly (1959–62)
By-election	Date	Incumbent	Party	Winner	Party	Cause	Retained
Pembina	December 9, 1960	Maurice Ridley	Progressive Conservative	Carolyne Morrison	Progressive Conservative	Death	Yes
Turtle Mountain	November 26, 1959	Errick Willis	Progressive Conservative	Edward Dow	Liberal-Progressive	Appointed Lieutenant Governor of Manitoba	No
Rhineland	November 26, 1959	Wallace C. Miller	Liberal-Progressive	Jacob Froese	Social Credit	Death	No
Cypress	November 26, 1959	Marcel Boulic	Progressive Conservative	Thelma Forbes	Progressive Conservative	Death	Yes
Arthur	November 26, 1959	John Cobb	Progressive Conservative	J. Douglas Watt	Progressive Conservative	Death	Yes

25th Legislative Assembly (1958–59)
By-election	Date	Incumbent	Party	Winner	Party	Cause	Retained
no by-elections

24th Legislative Assembly (1953–58)
By-election	Date	Incumbent	Party	Winner	Party	Cause	Retained
Manitou—Morden	November 14, 1957	Hugh Morrison	Progressive Conservative	Maurice Ridley	Progressive Conservative	Death	Yes
Emerson	November 14, 1957	John R. Solomon	Independent Liberal-Progressive	John Tanchak	Liberal-Progressive	Appointed a judge	Yes
St. George	December 30, 1956	Christian Halldorson	Liberal-Progressive	Elman Guttormson	Liberal-Progressive	Death	Yes
Mountain	June 27, 1955	Ivan Schultz	Liberal-Progressive	Walter Clark	Liberal-Progressive	Appointed a judge	Yes
Deloraine—Glenwood	June 27, 1955	James O. Argue	Progressive Conservative	Albert Draper	Progressive Conservative	Death	Yes

23rd Legislative Assembly of Manitoba (1949–53)
By-election	Date	Incumbent	Party	Winner	Party	Cause	Retained
La Verendrye	January 21, 1952	Sauveur Marcoux	Liberal-Progressive	Edmond Brodeur	Liberal-Progressive	Death	Yes
Brandon City	January 21, 1952	Joseph Donaldson	Independent (Note: Donaldson was a former Progressive Conservative who opposed leaving the coalition.)	Reginald Lissaman	Progressive Conservative	Resignation	No
St. Clements	October 24, 1950	Nicholas Stryk	Liberal-Progressive	Albert Trapp	Liberal-Progressive	Death	Yes
St. Andrews	October 24, 1950	James McLenaghen	Progressive Conservative	Thomas P. Hillhouse	Liberal-Progressive	Death	No

22nd Legislative Assembly (1945–49)
By-election	Date	Incumbent	Party	Winner	Party	Cause	Retained
Fairford	December 23, 1948	Stuart Garson	Liberal-Progressive	James Anderson	Liberal-Progressive	Resignation upon appointment to federal cabinet	Yes
Minnedosa	November 2, 1948	Earl Rutledge	Progressive Conservative	Henry Rungay	Liberal-Progressive	Resignation	No (Note: The Liberal-Progressives and Progressive Conservatives were in a coalition government during this time)

21st Legislative Assembly (1941–45)
By-election	Date	Incumbent	Party	Winner	Party	Cause	Retained
Portage la Prairie	November 18, 1943	Toby Sexsmith	Conservative	Charles Greenlay	Conservative	Death	Yes
Brandon City	November 18, 1943	George Dinsdale	Conservative	Dwight Johnson	CCF	Death	No
The Pas	August 17, 1943	John Bracken	Liberal-Progressive	Beresford Richards	CCF	Resignation to enter federal politics	No
Killarney	June 22, 1943	John Laughlin	Conservative	Abram Harrison	Conservative	Death	Yes
Dufferin	June 22, 1943 (Note: Won by acclamation)	John Munn	Liberal-Progressive	Earl Collins	Conservative	Death	No

20th Legislative Assembly of Manitoba 1936–1941
By-election	Date	Incumbent	Party	Winner	Party	Cause	Retained
no by-elections

== 10th–19th Legislatures (1899–1936) ==
19th Legislative Assembly (1932–36)
By-election	Date	Incumbent	Party	Winner	Party	Cause	Retained
Carillon	July 4, 1935	Albert Prefontaine	Liberal-Progressive	Edmond Prefontaine	Liberal-Progressive	Death	Yes
Russell	July 4, 1935†	Isaac Griffiths	Liberal-Progressive	Isaac Griffiths	Liberal-Progressive	Sought reelection upon appointment as Minister of Health And Public Welfare	Yes
Arthur	June 24, 1935	Duncan Lloyd McLeod	Liberal-Progressive	John R. Pitt	Liberal-Progressive	Death	Yes
Portage la Prairie	November 27, 1933	Fawcett Taylor	Conservative	Toby Sexsmith	Conservative	Appointed a judge	Yes

18th Legislative Assembly (1927–32)
By-election	Date	Incumbent	Party	Winner	Party	Cause	Retained
Mountain	January 29, 1930	Irving Cleghorn	Liberal	Ivan Schultz	Liberal	Death	Yes
Turtle Mountain	June 22, 1929	Richard G. Willis	Conservative	Alexander Welch	Conservative	Death	Yes
Morris	May 30, 1929	William Clubb	Progressive	William Clubb	Progressive	Sought reelection upon appointment as Minister of Public Works	Yes
Lansdowne	November 10, 1928	Tobias Norris	Liberal	Donald Gordon McKenzie	Progressive	Resignation	No (Note: McKenzie was elected as a "Liberal-Progressive" with both Liberal and Progressive support)

17th Legislative Assembly (1922–27)
By-election	Date	Incumbent	Party	Winner	Party	Cause	Retained
Lansdowne	December 9, 1925†	Tobias Norris	Liberal	Tobias Norris	Liberal	Resignation to run federally	Yes
Carillon	December 24, 1923	Albert Prefontaine	United Farmers	Albert Prefontaine	United Farmers	Sought reelection upon appointment as Provincial Secretary, Lands Commissioner and Railway Commissioner	Yes
Mountain	December 24, 1923	Charles Cannon	United Farmers	Charles Cannon	United Farmers	Sought reelection upon appointment as Minister of Education	Yes
Morris	August 26, 1922	William Clubb	United Farmers	William Clubb	United Farmers	Sought reelection upon appointment as Minister of Public Works	Yes
Minnedosa	August 26, 1922	Neil Cameron	United Farmers	Neil Cameron	United Farmers	Sought reelection upon appointment as Minister of Agriculture	Yes
Arthur	August 26, 1922	Duncan Lloyd McLeod	United Farmers	Duncan Lloyd McLeod	United Farmers	Sought reelection upon appointment as Provincial Secretary and Municipal Commissioner	Yes

16th Legislative Assembly (1920–22)
By-election	Date	Incumbent	Party	Winner	Party	Cause	Retained
Lakeside	January 31, 1921	Charles Duncan McPherson	Liberal	Charles Duncan McPherson	Liberal	Sought reelection upon appointment as Minister of Public Works	Yes
Birtle	October 14, 1920	George Malcolm	Liberal	George Malcolm	Liberal	Sought reelection upon appointment as Minister of Agriculture	Yes

15th Legislative Assembly (1915–20)
By-election	Date	Incumbent	Party		Winner	Party	Cause	Retained
Winnipeg North B	January 15, 1918	Richard Rigg		Social Democratic	Robert Jacob	Union-Liberal	Resignation to run federally	No
Minnedosa	November 30, 1917	George Grierson		Liberal	George Grierson	Liberal	Sought reelection upon appointment as Minister of Public Works	Yes
Roblin	November 19, 1917	Frederic Newton		Liberal	William James Westwood	Independent Liberal	Resignation	No
Iberville	November 1, 1917	Aime Benard		Conservative	Arthur Boivin	Conservative	Appointed to the Senate	Yes
Rupertsland	September 16, 1916	N/A	N/A	N/A	John Morrison	Independent Liberal	New seat created	N/A

14th Legislative Assembly (1914–15)
By-election	Date	Incumbent	Party	Winner	Party	Cause	Retained
no by-elections

13th Legislative Assembly (1910–14)
By-election	Date	Incumbent	Party		Winner	Party	Cause	Retained
Kildonan and St. Andrews	November 29, 1913	Orton Grain		Conservative	Walter Humphries Montague	Conservative	Resignation	Yes
St. Boniface	May 21, 1913	Joseph Bernier		Conservative	Joseph Bernier	Conservative	Sought reelection upon appointment as Provincial Secretary	Yes
Gimli	May 12, 1913	Baldwin Baldwinson		Conservative	Edmund L. Taylor	Conservative	Appointed Deputy Provincial Secretary	Yes
The Pas	October 22, 1912	N/A	N/A	N/A	Robert Orok	Conservative	New Seat created	N/A
Manitou	October 31, 1911	Robert Rogers		Conservative	James Morrow	Conservative	Appointed to the federal cabinet	Yes
Killarney	October 23, 1911	George Lawrence		Conservative	George Lawrence	Conservative	Sought reelection upon appointment as Minister of Agriculture	Yes
Russell	February 4, 1911	Angus Bonnycastle		Conservative	Frederic Newton	Conservative	Resignation	Yes

12th Legislative Assembly (1907–10)
By-election	Date	Incumbent	Party	Winner	Party	Cause	Retained
Birtle	November 27, 1909	Charles Mickle	Liberal	George Malcolm	Liberal	Appointed a judge	Yes
Virden	January 9, 1909	John Hume Agnew	Conservative	Harvey Simpson	Conservative	Death	Yes
Portage la Prairie	November 30, 1908	Hugh Armstrong	Conservative	Hugh Armstrong	Conservative	Sought reelection upon appointment as Provincial Treasurer	Yes
Gilbert Plains	November 17, 1908	Glenlyon Campbell	Conservative	Duncan Cameron	Conservative	Resignation to run federally	Yes
Brandon City	November 25, 1907	Stanley McInnis	Conservative	George Coldwell	Conservative	Death	Yes
Brandon City	July 16, 1907	Stanley McInnis	Conservative	Stanley McInnis	Conservative	Sought reelection upon appointment as Provincial Secretary and Municipal Commissioner	Yes
Beautiful Plains	March 26, 1907	James H. Howden	Conservative	James H. Howden	Conservative	Sought reelection upon appointment as Railway Commissioner	Yes

† Won by acclamation

11th Legislative Assembly (1903–07)
By-election	Date	Incumbent	Party	Winner	Party	Cause	Retained
Morden	May 18, 1906	John Ruddell	Conservative	George Ashdown	Conservative	Death	Yes
Mountain	April 27, 1905	Thomas Greenway	Liberal	Daniel A. McIntyre	Conservative	Resignation to run federally	No
Virden	March 12, 1904	John Hume Agnew	Conservative	John Hume Agnew	Conservative	Sought reelection upon appointment as Provincial Treasurer	Yes
Beautiful Plains	December 2, 1903	John Andrew Davidson	Conservative	James H. Howden	Conservative	Death	Yes

10th Legislative Assembly (1899–1903)
By-election	Date	Incumbent	Party	Winner	Party	Cause	Retained
Portage la Prairie	February 6, 1902	William Garland	Conservative	Hugh Armstrong	Conservative	Death	Yes
Winnipeg South	January 24, 1901	Hugh John Macdonald	Conservative	James Thomas Gordon	Conservative	Resignation to run federally	Yes
Manitou	December 31, 1900	Robert Rogers	Conservative	Robert Rogers	Conservative	Sought reelection upon appointment as Minister of Public Works	Yes
St. Boniface	November 24, 1900	S.A.D. Bertrand	Liberal	Joseph Bernier	Conservative	Resignation to run federally	No
Rhineland	November 19, 1900	Valentine Winkler	Liberal	Valentine Winkler	Liberal	Resignation to run federally	Yes
Woodlands	November 8, 1900	Rodmond Roblin	Conservative	Rodmond Roblin	Conservative	Sought reelection upon appointment as Premier	Yes
Winnipeg Centre	November 1, 1900	Daniel Hunter McMillan	Liberal	Thomas William Taylor	Conservative	Appointed Lieutenant Governor of Manitoba	No
Morris	October 29, 1900	Colin H. Campbell	Conservative	Colin H. Campbell	Conservative	Sought reelection upon appointment as Attorney-General	Yes
Beautiful Plains	March 10, 1900	Robert Ennis	Liberal	John Andrew Davidson	Conservative	Resignation	No
Winnipeg South	January 30, 1900	Hugh John Macdonald	Conservative	Hugh John Macdonald	Conservative	Sought reelection upon appointment as Premier	Yes
Emerson	January 30, 1900	David Henry McFadden	Conservative	David Henry McFadden	Conservative	Sought reelection upon appointment as Provincial Secretary and Minister of Public Works	Yes

== 1st–9th Legislatures (1870–96) ==
9th Legislative Assembly (1896–99)
By-election	Date	Incumbent	Party	Winner	Party	Cause	Retained
Turtle Mountain	November 27, 1897	John Hettle	Liberal	James Johnson	Independent Conservative	Death	No
Brandon South	November 20, 1897	Herbert Graham	Liberal	Frank Oliver Fowler	Liberal	Resignation	Yes
Dennis	July 15, 1897	Watson Crosby	Patrons of Industry	William James Kennedy	Liberal	Death	No
St. Boniface	February 20, 1897	James Prendergast	Liberal	Jean-Baptiste Lauzon	Conservative	Appointed a judge	No
Brandon North	December 19, 1896	Clifford Sifton	Liberal	Alexander Cumming Fraser	Liberal	Appointed to the federal cabinet	Yes
Birtle	December 11, 1896	Charles Mickle	Liberal	Charles Mickle	Liberal	Sought reelection upon appointment as Provincial Secretary	Yes
Lakeside	November 19, 1896	John Gunion Rutherford	Liberal	James McKenzie	Liberal	Resignation to run federally	Yes

8th Legislative Assembly (1892–95)
By-election	Date	Incumbent	Party	Winner	Party	Cause	Retained
Brandon City	August 23, 1894	Charles Adams	Liberal	Charles Adams	Liberal	By-election voided	Yes
Beautiful Plains	August 23, 1894	John Andrew Davidson	Conservative	John Forsyth	Patrons of Industry	Void Election	No
Brandon City	September 8, 1893	William Alexander Macdonald	Conservative	Charles Adams	Liberal	Void Election	No
Winnipeg South	January 20, 1893	John Donald Cameron	Liberal	John Donald Cameron	Liberal	Sought reelection upon appointment as Provincial Secretary	Yes

7th Legislative Assembly (1888–92)
By-election	Date	Incumbent	Party	Winner	Party	Cause	Retained
Winnipeg South	January 13, 1892	Isaac Campbell	Liberal	John Donald Cameron	Liberal	Resignation to run federally	Yes
Manitou	January 13, 1892	William Winram	Liberal	James Huston	Liberal	Death	Yes
Brandon North	May 1891	Clifford Sifton	Liberal	Clifford Sifton	Liberal	Sought reelection upon appointment as Attorney-General	Yes
Portage la Prairie	March 28, 1891	Joseph Martin	Liberal	Joseph Martin	Liberal	Resignation to run federally	Yes
Kildonan	February 1, 1890	John Norquay	Conservative	Thomas Norquay	Conservative	Death	Yes
Dennis	September 15, 1889	Daniel McLean	Liberal	Daniel McLean	Liberal	Sought reelection upon appointment as Provincial Secretary	Yes
Winnipeg Centre	May 18, 1889	Daniel Hunter McMillan	Liberal	Daniel Hunter McMillan	Liberal	Sought reelection upon appointment as Provincial Treasurer	Yes

6th Legislative Assembly (1886–88)
By-election	Date	Incumbent	Party	Winner	Party	Cause	Retained
Dufferin North	March 12, 1888	David H. Wilson	Conservative	Rodmond Roblin	Independent	Resignation	No
Shoal Lake	March 10, 1888	Charles Edward Hamilton	Conservative	Lyman Melvin Jones	Liberal	Resignation	No
Portage la Prairie	February 16, 1888	Joseph Martin	Liberal	Joseph Martin	Liberal	Sought reelection upon appointment as Attorney-General	Yes
La Verendrye	February 16, 1888	James Prendergast	Conservative	James Prendergast	Liberal	Sought reelection upon appointment as Provincial Secretary	No
Mountain	February 9, 1888	Thomas Greenway	Liberal	Thomas Greenway	Liberal	Sought reelection upon appointment as Premier	Yes
Brandon East	February 9, 1888	James A. Smart	Liberal	James A. Smart	Liberal	Sought reelection upon appointment as Minister of Public Works	Yes
St. Francois Xavier	January 12, 1888	Joseph Burke	Conservative	Frederick Francis	Liberal	Sought reelection upon appointment as Provincial Secretary	No
Assiniboia	January 10, 1888	Alexander Murray	Conservative	Duncan MacArthur	Liberal	Resignation	No

5th Legislative Assembly (1883–86)
By-election	Date	Incumbent	Party	Winner	Party	Cause	Retained
La Verendrye	August 24, 1885	Louis Arthur Prud'homme	Conservative	James Prendergast	Conservative	Appointed a judge	Yes
Winnipeg South	February 24, 1885	Albert Clements Killam	Liberal	Charles Edward Hamilton	Conservative	Appointed to the Supreme Court of Canada	No
Dufferin North	May 13, 1884	David H. Wilson	Conservative	David H. Wilson	Conservative	Sought reelection upon appointment as Provincial Secretary	Yes
Kildonan and St. Paul	April 8, 1884	Alexander Sutherland	Conservative	John MacBeth	Conservative	Death	Yes
La Verendrye	January 15, 1884	Maxime Goulet	Conservative	Louis Arthur Prud'homme	Conservative	Void Election	Yes
Emerson	June 23, 1883	Frederick Ernest Burnham	Liberal	Charles Douglas	Conservative	Void Election	No
Ste. Agathe	June 15, 1883	Alexander Kittson	Conservative	Joseph Ernest Cyr	Conservative	Death	Yes
Portage la Prairie	May 26, 1883	Joseph Martin	Liberal	Joseph Martin	Liberal	Void Election	Yes

4th Legislative Assembly (1879–82)
By-election	Date	Incumbent	Party		Winner	Party	Cause	Retained
Kildonan and St. Paul	September 14, 1882	Alexander Sutherland		Conservative	Alexander Sutherland	Conservative	Sought reelection upon appointment as Attorney-General	Yes
Birtle	August 24, 1882	Stephen Clement		Liberal	Edward Leacock	Conservative	Appointed Sheriff for the Western Judicial District	No
Springfield	August 17, 1882	Arthur Wellington Ross		Liberal	Charles Edie	Conservative	Resignation to run federally	No
La Verendrye	July 20, 1882†	Maxime Goulet		Conservative	Louis Arthur Prud'homme	Conservative	Appointed registrar	Yes
St. Boniface	December 15, 1881	Alphonse Alfred Clément Larivière		Conservative	Alphonse Alfred Clément Larivière	Conservative	Sought reelection upon appointment as Provincial Secretary	Yes
Turtle Mountain	November 2, 1881	N/A	N/A	N/A	James Peterkin Alexander	Conservative	New Seat created	N/A
Minnedosa	November 2, 1881	N/A	N/A	N/A	John Crerar	Liberal	New Seat created	N/A
Dauphin	November 2, 1881	N/A	N/A	N/A	John Andrew Davidson	Liberal	New Seat created	N/A
Brandon	November 2, 1881	N/A	N/A	N/A	John Wright Sifton	Liberal	New Seat created	N/A
Birtle	November 2, 1881	N/A	N/A	N/A	Stephen Clement	Liberal	New Seat created	N/A
Dufferin North	August 1, 1881	Andrew Laughlin		Conservative	David H. Wilson	Conservative	Appointed registrar	Yes
Winnipeg	December 4, 1880	Thomas Scott		Conservative	Daniel Hunter McMillan	Liberal	Resignation to run federally	No
Emerson	August 25, 1880	William Nash		Conservative	Thomas Carney	Conservative	Appointed registrar	Yes
La Verendrye	January 16, 1880	Maxime Goulet		Independent	Maxime Goulet	Conservative	Sought reelection upon appointment as Minister of Agriculture	No

3rd Legislative Assembly (1878–79)
By-election	Date	Incumbent	Party	Winner	Party	Cause	Retained
Headingly	June 24, 1879	John Taylor	Government	John Taylor	Government	Sought reelection upon appointment as Minister of Agriculture	Yes
St. Paul	June 17, 1879	Samuel Clarke Biggs	Government	Samuel Clarke Biggs	Government	Sought reelection upon appointment as Minister of Public Works	Yes
St. Norbert	January 1879	Pierre Delorme	Government	Pierre Delorme	Government	Sought reelection upon appointment as Minister of Agriculture	Yes
St. Charles	January 1879	Alexander Murray	Government	Alexander Murray	Government	Vacated seat on appointment as Police Magistrate in East Marquette, resigned office and was re-elected	Yes

2nd Legislative Assembly (1874–78)
By-election	Date	Incumbent	Party		Winner	Party	Cause	Retained
Lake Manitoba	January 17, 1877	Angus McKay		Independent	James McKay	Opposition	Resignation	No
St. Pauls	November 25, 1876	Curtis Bird		Independent	Alexander Black	Government	Death	No
Kildonan	April 1875	N/A	N/A	N/A	John Sutherland	Opposition	Election voided due to tie between John Sutherland and John Fraser	N/A
Ste. Anne	March 13, 1875	Charles Nolin		Government	Charles Nolin	Government	Sought reelection upon appointment as Minister of Agriculture	Yes
St. Andrews South	March 13, 1875	John Norquay		Government	John Norquay	Government	Sought reelection upon appointment as Provincial Secretary	Yes

1st Legislative Assembly (1870–74)
By-election	Date	Incumbent	Party	Winner	Party	Cause	Retained
Winnipeg and St. John	April 1874	Donald Alexander Smith	Government	Robert Atkinson Davis	Opposition	Resignation upon abolition of the dual mandate	No

== See also ==
- List of federal by-elections in Canada
