= 6th Manitoba Legislature =

The members of the 6th Manitoba Legislature were elected in the Manitoba general election held in December 1886. The legislature sat from April 14, 1887, to June 16, 1888.

Premier John Norquay formed a majority government. A falling-out with Canadian prime minister John A. Macdonald over railway development led to a financial shortfall in the Manitoba government accounts and the fall of the Norquay government in December 1887. David Howard Harrison served as premier for less than a month and then the Liberals led by Thomas Greenway took power.

Thomas Greenway served as Leader of the Opposition until 1888, when John Norquay became opposition leader.

David Glass served as speaker for the assembly.

There were two sessions of the 6th Legislature:

Session	Start	End
1st	April 14, 1887	June 10, 1887
2nd	January 12, 1888	May 8, 1888

James Cox Aikins was Lieutenant Governor of Manitoba.

== Members of the Assembly ==
The following members were elected to the assembly in 1886:

Member	Electoral district	Party	First elected / previously elected	No.# of term(s)	Notes
Alexander Murray	Assiniboia	Conservative	1874	5th term	
Duncan MacArthur (1888)	Assiniboia	Liberal	1888	1st term	from January 10, 1888
John Crawford	Beautiful Plains	Liberal	1886	1st term	
James A. Smart	Brandon East	Liberal	1886	1st term	
John Kirchhoffer	Brandon West	Conservative	1886	1st term	
Roger Marion	Carillon	Conservative	1886	1st term	
Thomas Gelley	Cartier	Conservative	1886	1st term	
Thomas Gelley	Cartier	Liberal	1886	1st term	
Robert Schuyler Thompson	Cypress	Liberal	1886	1st term	
Daniel McLean	Dennis	Liberal	1886	1st term	
David H. Wilson	Dufferin North	Conservative	1881	3rd term	
William Winram	Dufferin South	Liberal	1879	3rd term	
Rodmond Roblin (1888)	Dufferin South	Conservative	1888	1st term	
Charles Douglas	Emerson	Conservative	1883	2nd term	
John MacBeth	Kildonan and St. Paul	Conservative	1884	2nd term	
Kenneth McKenzie	Lakeside	Liberal	1874, (Note: Portage la Prairie) 1886	3rd term*	
James Prendergast	La Verendrye	Conservative	1885	2nd term	
James Prendergast	La Verendrye	Liberal	1885	2nd term	
John MacDonnell	Lorne	Liberal	1886	1st term	
James Gillies	Minnedosa East	Conservative	1886	1st term	
David Howard Harrison	Minnedosa West	Conservative	1883	2nd term	
Alphonse-Fortunat Martin	Morris	Liberal	1874, (Note: Ste. Agathe) 1886	2nd term*	
Thomas Greenway	Mountain	Liberal	1879	3rd term	
Samuel Thompson	Norfolk	Liberal	1886	1st term	
Joseph Martin	Portage la Prairie	Liberal	1883	2nd term	
Samuel Jacob Jackson	Rockwood	Liberal	1883	2nd term	
Edward Leacock	Russell	Conservative	1882	3rd term	
John Norquay	St. Andrews	Conservative	1870	6th term	
Alphonse Larivière	St. Boniface	Conservative	1878	4th term	
David Glass	St. Clements	Independent	1886	1st term	
Joseph Burke	St. Francois Xavier	Conservative	1886	1st term	
Frederick Francis (1888)	St. Francois Xavier	Liberal	1888	1st term	
Charles Edward Hamilton	Shoal Lake	Conservative	1886	1st term	
Lyman Melvin Jones (1888)	Shoal Lake	Liberal	1888	1st term	
James Peterkin Alexander	Souris	Conservative	1881, (Note: Turtle Mountain) 1888	2nd term*	
Thomas Henry Smith	Springfield	Conservative	1886	1st term	
Finlay Young	Turtle Mountain	Liberal	1883	2nd term	
Corydon Partlow Brown	Westbourne	Conservative	1874	5th term	
Edward Drewery	Winnipeg North	Liberal	1886	1st term	
William Luxton	Winnipeg South	Liberal	1874, (Note: Rockwood) 1886	2nd term*	
John Moore Robinson	Woodlands	Conservative	1886	1st term	

== By-elections ==
By-elections were held to replace members for various reasons:

Electoral district	Member elected	Affiliation	Election date	Reason
Assiniboia	Duncan MacArthur	Liberal	January 10, 1888	Resignation of A. Murray
St. Francois Xavier	Frederick Francis	Liberal	January 12, 1888	J Burke ran for reelection upon appointment as Provincial Secretary
Brandon East	James A. Smart	Liberal	February 9, 1888	J. A. Smart ran for reelection upon appointment as Minister of Public Works
Mountain	Thomas Greenway	Liberal	February 9, 1888	T. Greenway ran for reelection upon appointment as Premier
La Verendrye	James Prendergast	Liberal	February 16, 1888	J. Prendergast ran for reelection upon appointment as Provincial Secretary
Portage la Prairie	Joseph Martin	Liberal	February 16, 1888	J. Martin ran for reelection upon appointment as Attorney-General
Shoal Lake	Lyman Melvin Jones	Liberal	March 10, 1888	CE Hamilton left province
Dufferin North	Rodmond Roblin	Independent	March 12, 1888	Resignation of D.H. Wilson
