= John Andrew Davidson =

Canadian politician (1852–1903)

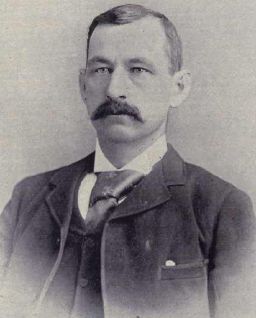

Member of the Legislative Assembly of Manitoba for Dauphin
- In office 1881–1886

Member of the Legislative Assembly of Manitoba for Beautiful Plains
- In office 1892–1903

Personal details
- Born: August 19, 1852 Thamesford, Canada West
- Died: November 14, 1903 (aged 51) Neepawa, Manitoba

John Andrew Davidson (August 19, 1852 – November 14, 1903) was a Manitoba politician. He was briefly the leader of Manitoba's Conservative parliamentary caucus in 1894, and later served as a cabinet minister in the governments of Hugh John Macdonald and Rodmond Roblin.

== Biography ==
Davidson was born in Thamesford, Canada West (now Ontario). He moved to Manitoba in 1871, and became a mill owner and general merchant, also serving on the Protestant school board.

Manitoba's boundaries were expanded in 1881, and Davidson was elected to the provincial legislature in a by-election as the first member for Dauphin. A Liberal, he defeated his sole opponent, Peter St. Clair McGregor, 148 votes to 17.

Party affiliations were fluid in Manitoba in this period, and by the general election of 1883 Davidson was identifying himself as a Liberal-Conservative, and a supporter of Premier John Norquay. He was re-elected in Dauphin without opposition.

Following redistribution, Davidson campaigned in the Beautiful Plains constituency for the provincial election of 1886. The Liberals saw their support rise in this campaign, and Davidson (now a Conservative) lost to Liberal John Crawford by thirty votes. Crawford again defeated Davidson in the 1888 election, this time by twenty-four votes.

Provincial support for the Conservatives recovered slightly in the 1892 election, and Davidson defeated Crawford by sixteen votes in their third encounter. The opposition caucus to which he belonged initially chose William Alexander Macdonald as its leader. When Macdonald's constituency election was overturned in 1893, Davidson was chosen in his place. He made his first speech as leader of the opposition in January 1894. Davidson was a moderate figure, whose interventions were respected by the province's Liberal leadership.

He did not serve as opposition leader for long. His constituency victory was also overturned on April 17, 1894, and he was subsequently defeated by John Forsyth of the Patrons of Industry in a by-election. After his loss, the leadership of the opposition seems to have fallen to James Fisher, an Independent MLA. Davidson again lost to a Patrons of Industry candidate in the 1896 election.

Though the Conservatives returned to government in the 1899 election, Davidson was once again defeated in Beautiful Plains, losing to Liberal Robert Ennis by ninety votes. He was, nonetheless, appointed to cabinet by Premier Hugh John Macdonald in January 1900, serving as Provincial Treasurer, Minister of Agriculture, and Provincial Lands Commissioner. Ennis was persuaded to resign his seat the following month, and Crawford was returned to the legislature in a by-election.

Rodmond Roblin took the Agriculture portfolio for himself on becoming Premier in late 1900, but kept Davidson in his other two positions. Within a year, Davidson had eliminated the debt accumulated during the previous administration of Thomas Greenway.

Davidson was re-elected in the 1903 election, but died shortly after the election.
