= James William Armstrong =

Canadian politician (1860–1928)

James William Armstrong (January 14, 1860 – February 26, 1928) was a politician in Manitoba, Canada. He served in the Legislative Assembly of Manitoba from 1907 to 1922 as a member of the Liberal Party, and was a cabinet minister in the government of Tobias Norris.

Armstrong was born in Kingston, Nova Scotia, the son of James Armstrong and Elizabeth Pearce, both Baptists of loyalist descent. He was educated at the Pictou Academy, Acadia College, the Manitoba Medical College, and King's College Hospital in London, UK. He received a Bachelor of Arts degree from Acadia, and medical certification from the MMC. Armstrong worked as a physician and surgeon, and was also president and director of the Gladstone Telephone and Electric Light Company. He served as district health officer and was a member of the Manitoba Board of Health from 1897 to 1899. In 1897, Armstrong married Mary Campbell.

He was first elected to the Manitoba legislature in the 1907 provincial election, defeating Conservative incumbent David Wilson by 61 votes in the constituency of Gladstone. He was re-elected by an increased margin in the 1910 election, and again in the election of 1914.

The Conservative administration of Rodmond Roblin, which had governed Manitoba since 1900, was forced to resign from office in early 1915 as the result of a corruption scandal. Although the Liberals held a minority of seats in the legislature, they were called on by the province's Lieutenant Governor to form a new government. Armstrong was appointed to Premier Norris's first cabinet on May 12, 1915, as Provincial Secretary and Municipal Commissioner. Armstrong was then re-elected by a landslide in the 1915 provincial election, in which the Liberals won 40 seats out of 47. He was retained in his cabinet portfolios after the election.

The Liberals were reduced to a minority government in the 1920 provincial election. Armstrong defeated Farmer candidate Wesley Lobb by 180 votes, and was retained in office after the election. He chose not to run again in 1922.

Armstrong died in Winnipeg at the age of 68 after suffering a stroke.
