= Minister of Agriculture (Manitoba) =

The Minister of Agriculture (formerly the Minister of Agriculture and Resource Development) is a cabinet minister in the province of Manitoba, Canada, responsible for Manitoba Agriculture. The ministry oversees provincial government activity in agriculture, agri-food, and the agri-product sector, as well as natural resource development.

The current Minister of Agriculture is Ron Kostyshyn of the New Democratic Party. He was appointed following the inauguration of the government led by Wab Kinew after the NDP's victory in the 2023 Manitoba general election.

== History ==
Some changes in the ministerial responsibilities have resulted in change to the name of the ministry. Manitoba Agriculture, Food and Rural Initiatives (MAFRI) was created on 4 November 2003, under the NDP government led by Gary Doer, when the Department of Agriculture and Food was merged with Rural Initiatives and Cooperative Development (both from the Department of Intergovernmental Affairs). On 3 May 2016, the new Progressive Conservative government, led by Brian Pallister, renamed the cabinet position as the "Minister of Agriculture".

In late 2019, oversight of the agriculture portfolio merged with that of natural resource development and sustainable development, thereby forming the new Ministry of Agriculture and Resource Development. Likewise, the remaining economic development and business portfolios of Growth, Enterprise and Trade formed the new Ministry of Economic Development and Training.

Name	Party	Took office	Left office
Minister of Agriculture
Thomas Howard	Conservative	January 13, 1871	January 23, 1871
Alfred Boyd	Government	January 23, 1871	December 14, 1871
John Norquay	Conservative	December 14, 1871	July 8, 1874
Edward Hay	Liberal	July 8, 1874	December 2, 1874
James McKay	Government	December 16, 1875	October 16, 1878
Pierre Delorme	Conservative	January 14, 1879	June 4, 1879
Maxime Goulet	Government	January 7, 1880	November 16, 1881
Marc-Amable Girard	Conservative	November 16, 1881	January 1883
Alphonse Larivière	Lib-Con	September 6, 1883	August 27, 1886
David Howard Harrison	Lib-Con	August 27, 1886	December 24, 1887
Thomas Greenway	Liberal	January 19, 1888	January 6, 1900
John Andrew Davidson	Liberal	January 10, 1900	December 22, 1900
Rodmond Roblin	Conservative	December 22, 1900	October 11, 1911
George Lawrence	Conservative	October 11, 1911	May 2, 1915
Valentine Winkler	Liberal	May 15, 1915	June 7, 1920
George Malcolm	Liberal	September 30, 1920	June 6, 1922
John Williams	Liberal	June 6, 1922	August 8, 1922
Neil Cameron	Progressive	August 8, 1922	December 3, 1923
John Bracken	Progressive	December 3, 1923	January 12, 1925
Albert Prefontaine	Progressive	January 12, 1925	May 29, 1932
Donald Gordon McKenzie	Lib–Progressive	May 27, 1932	April 28, 1936
John Bracken	Lib–Progressive	April 28, 1936	September 21, 1936
Douglas Campbell	Lib–Progressive	December 21, 1936	December 14, 1948
Francis Bell	Lib–Progressive	December 14, 1948	November 7, 1952
Ronald Robertson	Lib–Progressive	November 7, 1952	July 6, 1956
Charles Shuttleworth	Lib–Progressive	July 6, 1956	June 30, 1958
Errick Willis	PC	June 30, 1958	August 7, 1959
Minister of Agriculture and Conservation
George Hutton	PC	August 7, 1959	June 30, 1966
Minister of Agriculture
Harry Enns	PC	July 22, 1967	September 24, 1968
James Douglas Watt	PC	September 24, 1968	July 15, 1969
Sam Uskiw	New Democratic	July 15, 1969	October 24, 1977
James Downey	PC	October 24, 1977	November 30, 1981
Bill Uruski	New Democratic	November 30, 1981	September 21, 1987
Leonard Harapiak	New Democratic	September 21, 1987	May 9, 1988
Glen Findlay	PC	May 9, 1988	September 10, 1993
Harry Enns	PC	September 10, 1993	October 5, 1999
Minister of Agriculture and Food
Rosann Wowchuk	New Democratic	October 5, 1999	November 4, 2003
Minister of Agriculture, Food and Rural Initiatives
Rosann Wowchuk	New Democratic	November 4, 2003	November 3, 2009
Stan Struthers	New Democratic	November 3, 2009	January 13, 2012
Ron Kostyshyn	New Democratic	January 13, 2012	October 18, 2013
Minister of Agriculture, Food and Rural Development
Ron Kostyshyn	New Democratic	October 18, 2013	May 3, 2016
Minister of Agriculture
Ralph Eichler	PC	May 3, 2016	October 23, 2019
Minister of Agriculture and Resource Development
Blaine Pedersen	PC	October 23, 2019	July 15, 2021
Ralph Eichler	PC	July 15, 2021	January 18, 2022
Minister of Agriculture
Derek Johnson	PC	January 18, 2022	October 18, 2023
Ron Kostyshyn	New Democratic	October 18, 2023	present
