= Thomas Gilroy =

Thomas Gilroy is the name of:

- Thomas Francis Gilroy (1840–1911), mayor of New York, United States in 1893–1894
- Thomas Gilroy (Canadian politician) (1848–1905), mayor of Winnipeg in 1895
