= John Hume Agnew =

Canadian politician

Manitoba Provincial Treasurer
- In office March 2, 1904 – November 4, 1908
- Premier: Rodmond Roblin
- Preceded by: John Andrew Davidson
- Succeeded by: Hugh Armstrong

Member of the Legislative Assembly of Manitoba for Virden
- In office July 20, 1903 – November 9, 1908
- Preceded by: James Simpson
- Succeeded by: Harvey Simpson

Personal details
- Born: May 20, 1854 Prince Albert, Ontario County, Canada West
- Died: November 9, 1908 (aged 54)
- Education: Upper Canada College

John Hume Agnew (October 18, 1863 – November 9, 1908) was a politician in Manitoba, Canada. He served in the Legislative Assembly of Manitoba from 1903 until his death as a member of the Conservative Party, and was a prominent cabinet minister in the government of Rodmond Roblin.

Agnew was born in Prince Albert, Ontario County, Canada West (now Ontario), the son of Dr. Niven Agnew and Jane Somerville Ross, and was educated at Upper Canada College. Agnew moved to Winnipeg with his family in 1879; he studied law, articling with James Albert Manning Aikins, and was called to the Manitoba bar in 1884. He practised law in Virden, Manitoba. In 1888, he married Anna M. Dickson. Agnew was a school trustee in Virden for over ten years, and was a town councillor for two. In religion, he was a member of the Church of England.

He was first elected to the Manitoba legislature in the 1903 provincial election, defeating Liberal candidate F.W. Clinigan by 25 votes in the Virden constituency. He was appointed to Roblin's cabinet on March 2, 1904 as Provincial Treasurer. New cabinet appointees were required to seek a renewed mandate from their electors in this period of Canadian history, and Agnew was returned for Virden without opposition on March 12.

He was re-elected with an increased majority in the 1907 election, and was retained as Provincial Treasurer in the legislative sitting that following. He died in office in 1908.
