= John Greenway =

John Greenway may refer to:

- John Greenway (British politician), former British MP
- John Greenway (folklorist) (1919–1991)
- John Campbell Greenway (1872–1926), American mining, steel and railroad executive
- John Wesley Greenway (1861–1928), Canadian civil servant and politician
- John Greenway (died 1529), merchant of Tiverton, Devon
