= Friedrich Franz (disambiguation) =

Friedrich Franz (1783–1860) was a photography pioneer and university teacher of Gregor Mendel.

Friedrich Franz (or Frederick Francis) was also the name of several members of the House of Mecklenburg-Schwerin:

- Friedrich Franz I, Grand Duke of Mecklenburg-Schwerin (1756–1837)
- Friedrich Franz II, Grand Duke of Mecklenburg-Schwerin (1823–1883)
- Friedrich Franz III, Grand Duke of Mecklenburg-Schwerin (1851–1897)
- Friedrich Franz IV, Grand Duke of Mecklenburg-Schwerin (1882–1945)
- Friedrich Franz, Hereditary Grand Duke of Mecklenburg-Schwerin (1910–2001)

Frederick Francis may also refer to:

- Frederick Francis (Australian politician) (1881–1949), member of the Australian House of Representatives
- Frederick Francis (Canadian politician) (1845–1895), politician in Manitoba, Canada
- Frederick Francis (architect) (1818–1896), British architect of St Elphin's Church, Warrington
