= Manitoba Finance =

Department of finance for Manitoba, Canada

- Finances Manitoba

Department overview
- Type: Finance department
- Annual budget: $308.6 m CAD (2019/2020)
- Department executives: Adrien Sala, Minister of Finance; Richard Groen, Deputy Minister of Finance; Ann Ulusoy, Secretary to Treasury Board
- Website: www.gov.mb.ca/finance/

Manitoba Finance (French: Finances Manitoba) is the department of finance for the Canadian province of Manitoba.

The Minister of Finance (Ministre des Finances; originally Provincial Treasurer) is the cabinet minister responsible for the department, as well as for managing the province's fiscal resources, overseeing taxation policies, and allocating funds to other governmental departments. Every year, the minister submits a budget to the Legislature outlining anticipated expenditures and revenues for the next 12 months. The minister is also required to submit a completed financial report for the annual cycle just completed.

The Finance portfolio is the oldest cabinet position in the province of Manitoba, even predating the office of Premier by four years. Similarly, many regard the Finance Minister as the most important member of government, second only to the Premier. Prior to 1977, it was not considered unusual for Manitoba's provincial premiers to reserve the position of Treasurer or Finance Minister for themselves. In the 20th century, John Bracken, Stuart Garson, Douglas L. Campbell, Dufferin Roblin, and Edward Schreyer all assumed this responsibility at one time or another. (Roblin was his own Treasurer for the entire extent of his term in office). No premier has taken this responsibility since 1977, and such a combination of responsibilities would now be considered very unlikely.

The current Finance Minister of Manitoba is Adrien Sala of the New Democratic Party.

== Branches and divisions ==
Manitoba Finance includes the following special operating agencies, which present their own respective annual reports:

- Entrepreneurship Manitoba (a.k.a. the Companies Office) — the registrar for information about corporations and business names in Manitoba. The registry is publicly available to search. It is also responsible for the appointments and renewals of Commissioner for Oaths and Notary Publics.
- Manitoba Financial Service Agency
  - Financial Institutions Regulation Branch (FIRB)
  - Manitoba Securities Commission
- Public Guardian and Trustee Agency (under the Consumer Protection Division) — "manages and protects the affairs of Manitobans who are unable to do so themselves and have no one else willing or able to act," including mentally incompetent and vulnerable adults, children, and deceased estates.
- Vital Statistics Agency (under the Consumer Protection Division)

Other branches and divisions of Manitoba Finance include:

- Communication and Engagement Division (CED) — leads government communications in Manitoba, supporting the work of all government departments and several Crown organizations to provide information to Manitobans. CED, acting as the Queen’s Printer of Manitoba, also publishes the Manitoba Gazette and other statutory publications; provides leadership and coordination of Manitoba’s style and visual identity; and ensures the effective administration and oversight of Crown copyright.
  - Information and Privacy Policy Secretariat — responsible for central administration and coordination of The Freedom of Information and Protection of Privacy Act (FIPPA).
- Finance Research Division — primarily responsible for intergovernmental fiscal relations, economic and fiscal policy analysis, and the formulation of tax policy.
  - Manitoba Bureau of Statistics
- Manitoba Tax Assistance Office — provides information and assistance regarding Manitoba's income tax, tax credit programs, and program applications.
- Pension Commission — the Office of the Superintendent - Pension Commission is responsible for safeguarding employees’ rights to benefits promised under employment pension plans as provided under pension benefits legislation.
- Taxation Division — administers taxation legislation through information, compliance, audit, and enforcement programs, including: retail sales Tax, health and post secondary education tax levy, insurance corporations tax, corporation capital tax, tobacco tax, fuel tax, mining tax, and emissions tax on coal and petroleum coke.
- Treasury Board Secretariat — coordinates the annual budget and estimates, prepares the public accounts for the Government of Manitoba and provides financial and analytical support as well as strategic management advice to the Minister of Finance and the Treasury Board
- Treasury Division — manages and administers the cash resources, borrowing programs, and all investment and debt management activities of the provincial government.

=== Funeral Board of Manitoba ===
The Funeral Board of Manitoba (FBM) is a not-for-profit regulatory organization concerned with consumer protection within Manitoba's funeral and cemetery services marketplace. Administering The Funeral Directors and Embalmers Act, The Cemeteries Act, and The Prearranged Funeral Services Act, it is responsible for licensing all Manitoba funeral directors and embalmers; funeral homes; particular cemeteries and their sales persons; and prearranged funeral service plan providers.

Through the 1967 Embalmers and Funeral Directors Act the Board was established as the Board of Administration to oversee Manitoba's funeral industry. The Act was amended and renamed in 2009 to The Funeral Directors and Embalmers Act, which changed the Board's name to the Funeral Board of Manitoba.

=== Vital Statistics Agency ===
Manitoba Vital Statistics Agency
- Le Bureau de l'état civil

Agency overview
- Formed: 1995
- Type: special operating agency Civil registrar of vital events
- Employees: 40 FTEs (2019)
- Minister responsible: Richard Groen, Deputy Minister of Finance; Asst. Deputy Minister of the Consumer Protection Division
- Agency executives: Alena Lukes, Chief Operating Officer and Director of Vital Statistics; Kathryn Durkin-Chudd, Advisory Board Chair
- Parent department: Manitoba Finance
- Key document: The Vital Statistics Act
- Website: vitalstats.gov.mb.ca/

The Manitoba Vital Statistics Agency (VSA) is a special operating agency of the provincial government that is the civil registrar of Manitoba's vital records. More specifically, it is responsible for registering vital statistics (birth, death, marriage, stillbirth and change of name) in Manitoba and provides documents as proof of those events.

While the Agency began operations on 1 April 1994, the provincial vital event registry dates to 1882. As such, with all records being held in perpetuity for all Manitoba events, the database contains vital records information for the Province of Manitoba from 1882 to present. Nearly 4 million records are held in the database as of 2020.

The VSA reports to the Legislature through the Minister of Finance, and is responsible for administering and enforcing Manitoba's Vital Statistics Act, Marriage Act, Change of Name Act, as well as processing disinterments under The Public Health Act.

It is a member of the Vital Statistics Council for Canada (VSCC), which was established in 1945 as partnership of provincial/territorial vital event registrars and federal officials responsible for national statistics.

=== Manitoba Bureau of Statistics ===
The Manitoba Bureau of Statistics (MBS), a branch of the Finance Department's Finance Research Division, is the Manitoba government’s central statistics agency, tasked with compiling, managing, analyzing, coordinating, and disseminating of economic, demographic, and social statistics for the province.

Operating under the provincial Statistics Act, the Bureau addresses data and statistical requirements by collaborating with government departments and agencies; and, under a federal-provincial agreement, MBS is the designated contact and official liaison between the Government of Manitoba and the federal government's Statistics Canada.

=== Manitoba Financial Services Agency ===
Manitoba Financial Service Agency
- Office des services financiers du Manitoba

Agency overview
- Type: special operating agency
- Headquarters: 500-400 St. Mary Ave., Winnipeg, MB
- Employees: 48.6 FTEs (2019/2020)
- Minister responsible: Richard Groen, Deputy Minister of Finance
- Agency executive: David Cheop, Chief Administrative Officer
- Child agencies: Manitoba Securities Commission (MSC); Financial Institutions Regulation Branch (FIRB)

The Manitoba Financial Service Agency (MFSA; French: Office des services financiers du Manitoba) is a special operating agency of the Manitoba government responsible for administering and enforcing legislation for the securities and insurance sectors, real estate and mortgage brokers, credit unions/caisses populaires, cooperatives, and trust and loan companies who operate in Manitoba. It comprises the Manitoba Securities Commission (MSC) and Financial Institutions Regulation Branch (FIRB).

It is headed by a chief administrative officer, who is ex officio the Chair and chief executive officer of the MSC. As of at least 2020, the chief is David Cheop.

The Agency administers the following provincial legislation:

- The Securities Act, C.C.S.M. c. S 5 0
- The Commodity Futures Act, C.C.S.M. c. C152
- The Real Estate Brokers Act, C.C.S.M. c. R20
- The Mortgage Brokers Act, C.C.S.M. c. M210
- The Insurance Act, C.C.S.M. c. I40
- The Credit Unions and Caisse Populaires Act, C.C.S.M. c. C301
- The Cooperatives Act, C.C.S.M. c. C223
- The Corporations Act, C.C.S.M. c. C225, Part XXIV

==== Financial Institutions Regulation Branch ====
The Financial Institutions Regulation Branch (FIRB; French: Direction de la réglementation des institutions financières, DRIF) is the body responsible for regulatory oversight to financial institutions and cooperatives operating in Manitoba, including the insurance sector, credit unions/caisses populaires, and trust and loan companies. It is tasked with administering the provincial Insurance Act, Credit Unions and Caisses Populaires Act, and the Corporations Act (Part XXlV).

The FIRB was created in April 2000 through the amalgamation of two branches under the Department of Consumers and Corporate Affairs: the Insurance Branch and the Trust, Cooperatives and Credit Union Regulation Branch. Since then, government restructuring has led to the FIRB being part of various departments; as of October 2012, FIRB was merged into the Manitoba Financial Services Agency (MFSA).

==== Manitoba Securities Commission ====
The Manitoba Securities Commission (MSC; French: Commission des valeurs mobilières du Manitoba) is the securities regulatory authority of Manitoba. As a division of the Manitoba Financial Services Agency, it is an independent agency of the provincial government and its Chair reports to the legislature through the Minister of Finance.

Following The Securities Act, MSC was structured in its present form in 1968, divided into two branches:

1. the administrative or functional arm, consisting of full-time employees who conduct day-to-day operations. This arm includes 2 operating divisions of its own:
  - the Securities division, which is organized into several operational sections—investigation, legal, registration & compliance, corporate finance & continuous disclosure, finance & administration, and education/information.
  - Real Estate division
2. Commission members, the policy-making body consisting of Order-in-Council appointees (maximum of 7) who meet regularly.

The Chair presides at the Commission members' meetings and is also the chief executive officer of the administrative arm.

=== Public Utilities Board ===
The Manitoba Public Utilities Board is an independent quasi-judicial administrative tribunal that regulates public utilities and designated monopolies. It has oversight and supervisory powers over the rates charged for electrical utility, auto insurance, gas and propane utilities, and all water and sewer utilities outside of Winnipeg.

The Board is led by a chair and a vice-chair, appointed by the Lieutenant Governor. The chair has similar authority to that of a justice of the Manitoba Court of Queen's Bench or as the deputy minister for the Manitoba Justice. Board members, appointed by the chair, are tasked with carrying out the Board's legislative mandate. The PUB Chairperson reports to the Minister of Finance.

The Board has regulated services under legislation since 1913, with the current Public Utilities Board Act being passed in 1959. In addition to the Public Utilities Board Act, regulatory administration is provided through:

- Centra Gas Manitoba Inc. (natural gas distribution, utility rate setting)
- Crown Corporations Governance and Accountability Act
- Efficiency Manitoba Act
- Gas Allocation Act
- Gas Pipe Line Act (safety of natural gas and propane distribution)
- Greater Winnipeg Gas Distribution Act (natural gas distribution franchise)
- Manitoba Hydro (electric utility rate setting)
- Manitoba Public Insurance (auto insurance rate setting)
- Manitoba Water Services Board Act (appeals)
- Municipal Act (water and sewer utility rate regulation, excluding Winnipeg)
- Stittco Utilities Man Ltd. (propane distribution)
- The City of Winnipeg Charter

=== Treasury Board ===
The Treasury Board of Manitoba is a Cabinet sub-committee responsible for the overall fiscal management and reporting of the provincial government, as well as the "establishment of policies required for the effective management of public funds to meet government objectives."

The Treasury Board Secretariat of Manitoba provides financial and analytical support as well as strategic management advice to the Minister of Finance and Treasury Board. The Secretariat is headed by a Deputy Minister who acts as Secretary to Treasury Board, currently Ann Ulusoy. It has been an independent secretariat since 1987/88.

Treasury Board Secretariat consists of the:

- Office of the Secretary to Treasury Board,
- Office of the Provincial Comptroller,
- Fiscal Management and Capital Planning Division,
- Analytical Division,
- Strategic Initiatives Division, and the
- Scorecards Division.

== History ==
The Finance portfolio is the oldest cabinet position in the province, predating the office of Premier by four years; and the minister was styled as the Provincial Treasurer until 1969. The first Provincial Secretary in Manitoba was Marc-Amable Girard, who was appointed to the position on 16 September 1870 by Lieutenant-Governor Adams George Archibald soon after his arrival in the province. Until January 1871, Girard and Provincial Secretary Alfred Boyd were the only members of Archibald's ministry. Since the introduction of partisan politics in 1888, all Manitoba Finance Ministers have belonged to the governing party of the day. During the coalition ministry that governed Manitoba from 1940 to 1950, the position was reserved for members of the dominant Liberal-Progressive Party.

Prior to 1977, it was typical for Manitoba's provincial premiers to reserve the position of Treasurer or Finance Minister for themselves. In the 20th century, John Bracken, Stuart Garson, Douglas L. Campbell, Dufferin Roblin, and Edward Schreyer all assumed this responsibility at one time or another. (Roblin was his own Treasurer for the entire extent of his term in office). No premier has taken this responsibility since 1977, and such a combination of responsibilities would now be considered very unlikely.

In early 2005, then Minister of Finance Greg Selinger indicated that his department would soon move to a system known as generally accepted accounting principles, which had already been adopted in most other provinces.

Following the 2019 provincial general election, Manitoba Finance underwent significant reorganization. While Central Services branched off as an independent department, the Finance department gained its Labour and Regulatory Services Division, the Consumer Protection Division, and Communications Services Manitoba, as well as the Vital Statistics Agency, Entrepreneurship Manitoba, and the Public Guardian and Trustee of Manitoba.

== List of ministers of finance ==
Minister of Finance
- Ministre des Finances
- Incumbent; Adrien Sala since October 18, 2023
- Manitoba Finance
- Member of: Executive Council of Manitoba
- Formation: 1870 (as Provincial Treasurer)
- First holder: Marc-Amable Girard

Name	Party	Took office	Left office
Marc-Amable Girard	Conservative	September 16, 1870	March 14, 1872
Thomas Howard	Conservative	March 14, 1872	July 8, 1874
Robert A. Davis	Non-partisan	July 8, 1874	October 16, 1878
John Norquay	Conservative	October 16, 1878	August 27, 1886
Alphonse La Riviere	Liberal-Conservative	August 31, 1886	December 26, 1887
David H. Harrison	Liberal-Conservative	December 26, 1887	January 19, 1888
Lyman Jones	Liberal	January 19, 1888	May 7, 1889
Daniel H. McMillan	Liberal	May 7, 1889	January 6, 1900
John Andrew Davidson	Liberal	January 10, 1900	November 14, 1903
John Hume Agnew	Conservative	March 2, 1904	November 4, 1908
Hugh Armstrong	Conservative	November 19, 1908	May 12, 1915
Edward Brown	Liberal	May 12, 1915	August 8, 1922
Francis Black	Progressive	August 8, 1922	January 12, 1925
John Bracken	Progressive	January 18, 1925	May 27, 1932
Ewan McPherson	Liberal-Progressive	May 27, 1932	September 21, 1936
Stuart Garson	Liberal-Progressive	September 21, 1936	November 13, 1948
John Cameron Dryden	Liberal-Progressive	December 14, 1948	February 16, 1950
Douglas L. Campbell	Liberal-Progressive	February 16, 1950	December 1, 1951
Ronald Turner	Liberal-Progressive	December 1, 1951	July 6, 1956
Charles Greenlay	Liberal-Progressive	July 6, 1956	June 30, 1958
Dufferin Roblin	Progressive Conservative	June 30, 1958	July 22, 1966
Edward Gurney Evans	Progressive Conservative	July 22, 1966	July 17, 1969
Saul Cherniack	New Democratic Party	July 17, 1969	November 13, 1972
Edward Schreyer	New Democratic Party	November 13, 1972	May 2, 1973
Saul Cherniack	New Democratic Party	May 2, 1973	January 8, 1975
Edward Schreyer	New Democratic Party	January 8, 1975	September 22, 1976
Saul Miller	New Democratic Party	September 22, 1976	October 24, 1977
Donald Craik	Progressive Conservative	October 24, 1977	January 16, 1981
Brian Ransom	Progressive Conservative	January 16, 1981	November 30, 1981
Victor Schroeder	New Democratic Party	November 30, 1981	April 17, 1986
Eugene Kostyra	New Democratic Party	April 17, 1986	May 9, 1988
Clayton Manness	New Democratic Party	May 9, 1988	September 10, 1993
Eric Stefanson	Progressive Conservative	September 10, 1993	February 5, 1999
Harold Gilleshammer	Progressive Conservative	February 5, 1999	October 5, 1999
Greg Selinger	New Democratic Party	October 5, 1999	September 14, 2009
Rosann Wowchuk	New Democratic Party	November 3, 2009	October 3, 2011
Stan Struthers	New Democratic Party	October 19, 2011	October 18, 2013
Jennifer Howard	New Democratic Party	October 18, 2013	November 3, 2014
Greg Dewar	New Democratic Party	November 3, 2014	May 3, 2016
Cameron Friesen	Progressive Conservative	May 3, 2016	August 1, 2018
Scott Fielding	Progressive Conservative	August 1, 2018	January 18, 2022
Cameron Friesen	Progressive Conservative	January 18, 2022	January 30, 2023
Cliff Cullen	Progressive Conservative	January 30, 2023	October 18, 2023
Adrien Sala	New Democratic Party	October 18, 2023	incumbent

== See also ==
- Minister of Finance (Canada)
