= Dufferin (Manitoba provincial electoral district) =

Defunct provincial electoral district in Manitoba, Canada

Dufferin is a former provincial electoral district in Manitoba, Canada. It was originally created in 1879 as two divisions, Dufferin North and Dufferin South. Dufferin was consolidated into a single constituency for the 1888 provincial election, but was eliminated with the 1892 election.

Dufferin returned to the electoral map for the 1903 election, and was eliminated through redistribution in 1969.

The constituency was represented for many years by Rodmond Roblin, who served as Premier of Manitoba from 1900 to 1915. Roblin's grandson, who also served as premier, was named "Dufferin."

== Members of the Legislative Assembly for Dufferin North ==
Dufferin North elected members to the Legislative Assembly of Manitoba from 1879 to 1886. The members it elected were:

Name	Party	Took office	Left office
Andrew Laughlin	Opposition/Conservative	1879	1881
David H. Wilson	Conservative	1881	1888
Rodmond Roblin	Liberal	1888	1888

== Members of the Legislative Assembly for Dufferin South ==
Dufferin South elected members to the Legislative Assembly of Manitoba from 1879 to 1886. The winner of all three elections was William Winram.

Name	Party	Took office	Left office
William Winram	Independent	1879	1883
William Winram	Liberal	1883	1888

== Members of the Legislative Assembly for Dufferin ==
Dufferin elected members to the Legislative Assembly of Manitoba from 1888 to 1966. The members it elected were:

Name	Party	Took office	Left office
Rodmond Roblin	Liberal	1888	1889
Rodmond Roblin	Conservative	1889	1892
Riding did not exist			
Rodmond Roblin	Conservative	1903	1915
Edward August	Liberal	1915	1922
William Brown	Progressive	1922	1927
John Munn	Progressive	1927	1932
	Liberal–Progressive	1932	1941
Earl Collins	Conservative (Coalition)	1941	1945
Earl Collins	Independent (Coalition)	1945	1949
Walter McDonald	Liberal–Progressive	1949	1959
William Homer Hamilton	Progressive Conservative	1959	1969

== See also ==
- List of Manitoba provincial electoral districts
- Canadian provincial electoral districts
