= Albert Prefontaine =

Canadian politician (1861–1935)

Albert Préfontaine (October 11, 1861 – February 21, 1935) was a politician in Manitoba, Canada. He served as leader of the Manitoba Conservatives in the late 1910s, and was subsequently a member of the United Farmers of Manitoba.

Born in Upton, Canada East (now Quebec), the son of Firmin Prefontaine and Mathilde (Mathilda) Desautels, Préfontaine was educated in Greenfield, Massachusetts. He subsequently moved to Manitoba in 1880, where he worked as a farmer and store manager and served as Reeve of the Municipality of De Salaberry from 1892 to 1896. In 1888, he married Albina L'Heureux. Préfontaine was president of the Carillon Agricultural Society, of the Carey Elevator Company and of the St. Pierre Trading Company.

Préfontaine was first elected to the provincial parliament in 1903, running for Rodmond Roblin's governing Conservatives in the francophone riding of Carillon. He was re-elected in 1907 and 1910.

In 1914, Préfontaine lost his seat to Liberal Thomas Molloy by seven votes. He was re-elected the following year, despite the disastrous showing of the Conservatives in the rest of the province. His victory may be credited to the fact that the provincial Conservatives were seen as more supportive of francophone rights than were Tobias Norris's Liberals (indeed, Norris' government withdrew state funding for French-language education soon after the election).

Conservative leader James Aikins lost his seat in the 1915 election, and Préfontaine was chosen to lead the small opposition caucus in parliament (he was sworn in as leader of the opposition in January 1916). He declined to be a candidate in the party's leadership convention, held on November 6, 1919.

Although it had been in government from 1900 to 1915, the Conservative Party of Manitoba was marginalized by developments in the later half of the 1910s. Increasingly radicalized farmer and labour groups were forming political organizations of their own, and the old divisions between Grit and Tory no longer seemed as relevant. The Conservatives again fared poorly in the election of 1920, and Préfontaine was personally defeated by Farmer candidate Maurice Duprey.

After this loss, Préfontaine detached himself from the Conservative Party. He ran as an Independent in the federal election of 1921, losing to Progressive candidate Arthur-Lucien Beaubien in the Provencher riding, and subsequently left the Conservatives to join the United Farmers of Manitoba. Running as a UFM candidate, he was re-elected for Carillon in 1922.

On December 3, 1923, Premier John Bracken appointed Préfontaine to the high-level cabinet positions of Provincial Secretary, Provincial Lands Commissioner and Railway Commissioner. Préfontaine also became Minister of Agriculture in 1925. In the 1927 election, he defeated his old nemesis Thomas Molloy by a landslide.

Préfontaine stood down as Provincial Secretary, Provincial Lands Commissioner and Minister of Agriculture in 1928, though he retained the Railway Commissioner's position until 1932. He was re-elected in that year's general election, and continued to serve the Franco-Manitoban community as a Minister without Portfolio until his death in 1935.

Préfontaine's career reveals the continued importance of the francophone community to Manitoba politics, even after immigration from Ontario and Eastern Europe had significantly reduced their relative strength. His decision to join the UFM was indicative of a larger cultural change, as Franco-Manitobans became an important part of the Progressive Party of Manitoba during its long period in government.

His son Edmond also served in the Manitoba assembly.

The resort community of Albert Beach, Manitoba (French: "Plage Albert") was named after him.
