= Thomas Howard (Manitoba politician) =

Canadian politician

Thomas Howard (1845 – July, 1903) was a political figure in Manitoba. He represented St Peters from 1871 to 1874 and St. Clements from 1874 to 1878 in the Legislative Assembly of Manitoba.

He was born in Kingston, Ontario, the son of Dr. Henry Howard, and was educated in Montreal. Howard came to Manitoba as captain and paymaster with Wolseley's Red River Expeditionary Force in 1869. He served in the Manitoba cabinet as Minister of Agriculture, Minister of Public Works, Provincial Secretary and Provincial Treasurer. Howard was also secretary for the Board of Health for Manitoba and the North-West Territories, a founding member of the Winnipeg Board of Trade in 1873 and a director for the Manitoba and Northwestern Railway.

He was murdered during a visit to San Francisco in 1903.
