= Daniel McLean (sheriff) =

Canadian politician

Daniel Dennis McLean
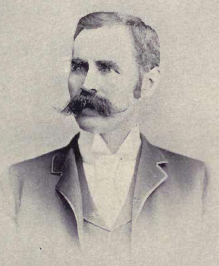

Member of the Legislative Assembly of Manitoba for Dennis
- In office December 9, 1886 – July 23, 1892
- Preceded by: Constituency Created
- Succeeded by: James Findlay Frame

Personal details
- Born: May 20, 1854 Elgin County, Canada West
- Died: August 25, 1908 (aged 54) Portage la Prairie, Manitoba
- Party: Liberal

Daniel Dennis McLean (May 20, 1854 – August 25, 1908) was a Canadian politician. He represented Dennis in the Legislative Assembly of Manitoba from 1886 to 1892 as a Liberal. His surname also appears as MacLean.

Born in Elgin County, Canada West, the son of John McLean, McLean was raised on a farm before studying to become a teacher. After having health problems, he moved to Manitoba settling in the Pipestone Valley in the County of Dennis where he was a farmer. From 1884 to 1886, he was reeve for the Rural Municipality of Pipestone. McLean was elected to the Legislative Assembly of Manitoba in the 1886 election. He was re-elected in 1888 and was defeated in 1892. From September 5, 1889 to May 26, 1892 he was the Provincial Secretary. McLean also served as Minister of Education. In 1891, he married Elizabeth Strevel.

In 1892, McLean was named sheriff for the Central Judicial District in Portage la Prairie. In 1895, he was named governor for the Central Judicial Jail, resigning from that post in 1907 due to poor health. McLean died at home in Portage la Prairie the following year.
