= David Wilson (Manitoba politician) =

Canadian politician (1858–1927)

Member of the Legislative Assembly of Manitoba for Gladstone
- In office 1903–1907
- Preceded by: Corydon Brown
- Succeeded by: James William Armstrong

Personal details
- Born: May 25, 1858 Limerick, Ireland
- Died: December 6, 1927 (aged 69) Ireland
- Party: Conservative

David Wilson (May 25, 1858 – December 6, 1927) was an Irish-born rancher, financial agent and political figure in Manitoba. He represented Gladstone from 1903 to 1907 in the Legislative Assembly of Manitoba as part of the Conservative Party of Manitoba.

== Background ==
Born in Limerick, the son of Reverend David Wilson, Wilson was educated at Switzers and Weir's College and was a member of the Corn Exchange in London from 1879 to 1883. In 1883, Wilson moved to Manitoba and ranched until 1902, also serving as reeve for the Rural Municipality of Lansdowne.

Wilson married Emily Bates in 1891. He was defeated when he ran for reelection to the Manitoba assembly in 1907.

== Last Years ==
After becoming a partner in an investment firm in Winnipeg around 1906, Wilson retired in 1922 due to poor health and subsequently returned to Ireland. He died there at the age of 69.
