= Hugh John Macdonald =

Canadian politician (1850–1929)

The Honourable Sir Hugh John Macdonald PC
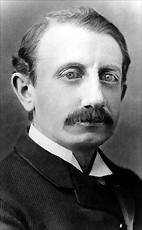

8th Premier of Manitoba
- In office January 10, 1900 – October 29, 1900
- Monarch: Victoria
- Lieutenant Governor: James C. Patterson; Daniel Hunter McMillan
- Preceded by: Thomas Greenway
- Succeeded by: Rodmond Roblin

Member of Parliament for Winnipeg
- In office March 5, 1891 – May 4, 1893
- Preceded by: William Bain Scarth
- Succeeded by: Joseph Martin
- In office June 23, 1896 – March 29, 1897
- Preceded by: Joseph Martin
- Succeeded by: Richard Willis Jameson

Member of the Legislative Assembly of Manitoba for Winnipeg South
- In office December 7, 1899 – October 29, 1900
- Preceded by: John Donald Cameron
- Succeeded by: James Thomas Gordon

Personal details
- Born: March 13, 1850 Kingston, Canada West
- Died: March 29, 1929 (aged 79) Winnipeg, Manitoba
- Party: Conservative
- Spouses: Jean Murray King (m. 1876; died 1881) Gertrude Agnes VanKoughnet (m. 1883)
- Children: Isabella Mary "Daisy" Gainsford (née Macdonald); John Alexander "Jack" Macdonald
- Parent(s): John A. Macdonald; Isabella Clark
- Education: University of Toronto (BA)
- Occupation: Lawyer
- Profession: politician
- Cabinet: Minister of the Interior (1896); Superintendent-General of Indian Affairs (1896); President of the Council (1900); Attorney-General (1900); Municipal Commissioner (1900); Railway Commissioner (1900)

Military service
- Allegiance: Upper Canada
- Branch/service: Canadian militia
- Years of service: 1866-1885
- Rank: Private; Ensign; Lieutenant
- Unit: 14th Battalion Volunteer Militia Rifles; Queen's Own Rifles of Canada; 90th Winnipeg Rifles
- Battles/wars: Fenian Raids; Cornwall; Wolseley expedition; North-West Rebellion; Battle of Fish Creek

Sir Hugh John Macdonald, PC (March 13, 1850 – March 29, 1929) was the only surviving son of the first prime minister of Canada, John A. Macdonald. He too was a politician, serving as a member of the House of Commons of Canada and a federal cabinet minister, and briefly as the eighth premier of Manitoba.

== Early life ==
Macdonald was born in Kingston, Canada West (now Ontario) to Canada's first Prime Minister, John A. Macdonald and his first wife Isabella Clark Macdonald (1809–1857). After Isabella died leaving Macdonald a widower with a seven-year-old son, Hugh John Macdonald would be principally raised by his paternal aunt and her husband. In 1869, he received a Bachelor of Arts degree from the University of Toronto and then studied law in Toronto and Ottawa. He was called to the Bar in 1872, and became a member of his father's firm. Grieved by the death of his first wife, Macdonald moved to Winnipeg in 1882 and set up his own law practice.

== Military service ==
Macdonald served with the 14th Battalion Volunteer Militia Rifles during the summer of 1866 near Cornwall, in anticipation of a Fenian invasion. While at the University of Toronto, he enrolled in The Queen's Own Rifles of Canada on 13 October 1868 as a rifleman and rose to the rank of sergeant before being commissioned as an ensign on 22 April 1870.

Macdonald then joined the expedition of Colonel Garnet Joseph Wolseley as an ensign in the 16th Company of the 1st (Ontario) Battalion of Rifles and made the trek to the Red River settlement in Manitoba. The Wolseley Expedition was formed to put down Louis Riel's Red River Rebellion. After taking part in the bloodless capture of Upper Fort Garry (after Riel's departure) he returned to Toronto, but would take part in putting down Riel's second rebellion.

He retired from the QOR on 26 April 1882 and moved to Winnipeg. During the North-West rebellion in 1885, Macdonald served as a lieutenant in the 90th (Winnipeg) Battalion of Rifles, a unit which he helped to organize. He later fought at Fish Creek in Saskatchewan.

== Marriage ==
In 1876, Hugh John Macdonald married Jean Murray King, a Roman Catholic. They had one daughter, Isabella Mary "Daisy" Macdonald (1877–1959). Jean King Macdonald later died in 1881 as a result of fragile health due to Daisy's birth.

In 1883, he married Agnes Gertrude VanKoughnet. She was the daughter of a close friend and political ally of his father, Salter Jehosaphat VanKoughnet (1833–1888) QC, of Toronto, a brother of Philip Michael Matthew Scott VanKoughnet. Gertrude's mother, Agnes, was a daughter of Senator Benjamin Seymour, of Port Hope, Ontario, and the sister of Emily Seymour who was married to Lt. Colonel Arthur Trefusis Heneage Williams. They had a son, John Alexander "Jack" Macdonald (1884–1905). The Macdonalds are buried at St John's Cathedral Cemetery.

== Politics ==
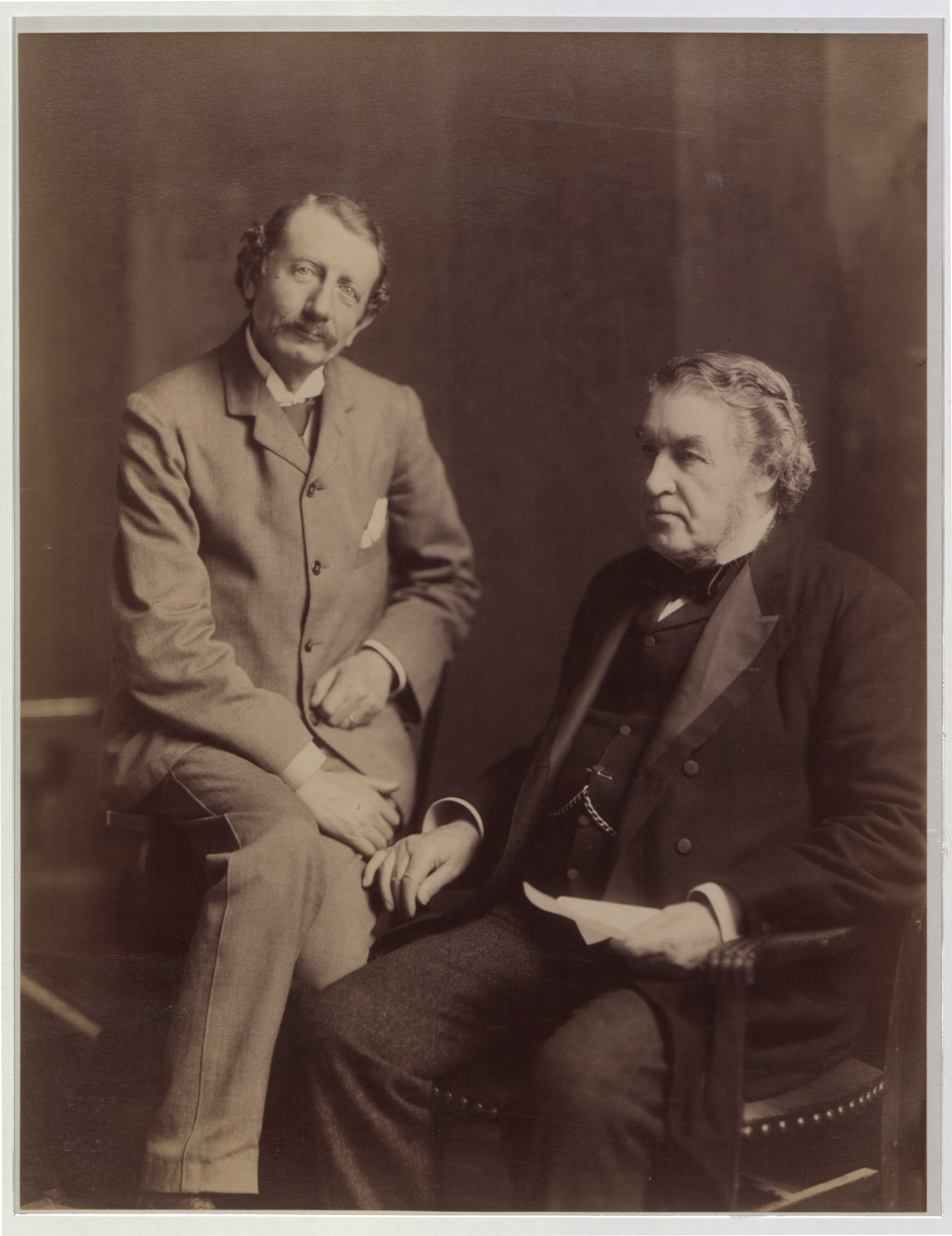
Macdonald with Charles Tupper, 1900

Macdonald was elected to the House of Commons in the 1891 federal election, representing Winnipeg City for the Conservative Party. He was sworn into parliament at the side of his father, to the applause of members from both sides. After the older Macdonald died later in the year, however, Hugh John showed little enthusiasm for life in Ottawa. Despite efforts by John Abbott and John S.D. Thompson to keep him in federal politics, he resigned his seat in 1893 and returned to Winnipeg.

In 1896, Prime Minister Charles Tupper convinced him to return to Ottawa and serve as Minister of the Interior and Superintendent-General of Indian Affairs. This occurred at a time when the Conservative Party was suffering from internal divisions, and was due to face the public in a general election. Tupper probably hoped that the Macdonald name would win back some wayward voters.

The 1896 election was won by Wilfrid Laurier's Liberals, and while Macdonald was again elected for Winnipeg City (narrowly defeating former provincial minister Joseph Martin), his election was declared void in early 1897. He once again returned to Winnipeg, and did not contest the subsequent by-election.

In March 1897, Macdonald was approached to take the leadership of Manitoba's Conservative Party. The party had suffered severe losses to Thomas Greenway's Liberals in the elections of 1888, 1892 and 1896, and had lacked direction since the death of former Premier John Norquay in 1889. By 1897, however, there was a recognition that the provincial situation was susceptible to change. Greenway's second and third majorities were based almost entirely on popular support for his education reforms; with the education issue resolved in 1896, the Conservatives had a viable chance to form government. Macdonald accepted the leadership position, and (though without seat in the legislature) spent the next two years touring the province in anticipation of the next election.

== Premiership ==
The Conservative Party of Manitoba became a legally recognized entity in 1899, and drew up its first election platform shortly thereafter. This was a progressive document by the standards of its age, calling for an independent board of education, new agricultural and technical colleges, a Workmen's Compensation Act, prohibition, and the nationalization of railways. On a less progressive note, the party also tapped into popular resentment toward new Eastern European immigrants. Both of these factors contributed to an upset victory in the 1899 provincial election, with Conservatives taking 22 seats out of 40. Macdonald narrowly defeated incumbent Liberal John D. Cameron in Winnipeg South, and was sworn in as Premier on January 10, 1900. He also took the position of Municipal Commissioner.

His term in office was brief. Macdonald succeeded in passing a prohibition bill (known as the "Macdonald Act"), but was again prevailed upon to run for the federal Conservatives in the 1900 federal election. It is possible that he intended to replace Charles Tupper as national party leader.

Macdonald resigned as premier on October 29, 1900, and challenged minister of the interior Clifford Sifton in the riding of Brandon. Sifton was the most powerful cabinet minister in western Canada, but the Conservatives believed that Hugh John's personal popularity would be enough to defeat him. They were mistaken. Despite a spirited challenge, Sifton won the election with 5,011 votes to Macdonald's 4,342.

Macdonald abandoned electoral politics after this loss, and returned to his law practice. He continued to be involved in the Conservative Party organization within Manitoba, serving as president of the Manitoba Conservative Association from 1905 to 1908. He was appointed police magistrate for Winnipeg in 1911, and was made a Knight Bachelor in June 1913. There were rumours that he would return to lead the Conservative Party in 1915, but this did not come to pass.

Macdonald was Winnipeg's magistrate during the Winnipeg General Strike in 1919. Immigrants arrested during the strike appeared before him, and he ordered them sent to an internment camp at Kapuskasing, from where they were eventually deported without the right to formal hearings.

Macdonald's last home in downtown Winnipeg, called Dalnavert, is now a museum. It was designated a National Historic Site of Canada in 1990.

== See also ==
- Canadian peers and baronets concerning his stepmother Agnes Macdonald, 1st Baroness Macdonald of Earnscliffe
