= James H. Howden =

Canadian politician

James Henry Howden (October 11, 1860 – July 16, 1938) was a politician in Manitoba, Canada. He served in the Legislative Assembly of Manitoba as a member of the Conservative Party from 1903 to 1915, and was a cabinet minister in the government of Rodmond Roblin.

Howden was born in Milton, Canada West (now Ontario), the son of Robert Howden, and was educated at St. Catharines. In 1882, Howden came to Winnipeg where he trained as a lawyer and was called to the Manitoba bar in 1887. He practised as a barrister. In 1891, Howden moved to Neepawa. He married Barbara McIntosh in 1894. Howden served as mayor of Neepawa from 1900 to 1904. He also owned farms in the province and was president of the King Edward Hotel Company. In religion, Howden was a Methodist.

He was first elected to the Manitoba legislature in a by-election held on December 2, 1903, in the constituency of Beautiful Plains. Howden ran to replace the late Conservative cabinet minister John Andrew Davidson and was elected without opposition. He initially served as a backbench supporter of Roblin's ministry.

He was re-elected over Liberal Alexander Dunlop by 112 votes in the 1907 election, and was named to cabinet on March 16, 1907 as Railway Commissioner. He was reassigned as Minister of Telephones and Telegraphs on March 4, 1908, and was also named Provincial Secretary on November 6, 1908.

Howden was returned by acclamation in the 1910 provincial election, and was promoted to Attorney General on October 11, 1911. He also retained responsibility for Telephones and Telegraphs. He defeated Liberal candidate William Wood by thirty-two votes in the 1914 election, and kept both of his portfolios in the legislative sitting which followed.

The Roblin administration was forced to resign in early 1915, after a commission of enquiry established by the Lieutenant Governor concluded that the government was guilty of corruption in the tendering of contracts for new legislative buildings. Howden resigned from office on May 12, 1915, and did not seek re-election in the campaign that followed.

The commission report concluded that Roblin, Attorney General James H. Howden and developer Thomas Kelly had conspired to commit fraud in the contract arrangements. Howden was indicted, but was eventually discharged of criminal responsibility.

He died suddenly at a family reunion at Wasagaming.
