= George R. Coldwell =

Canadian politician

George Robson Coldwell (4 July 1858 – 24 January 1924) was a politician in Manitoba, Canada. He served in the Legislative Assembly of Manitoba from 1907 to 1915, and was a cabinet minister in the government of Rodmond Roblin. Coldwell was a member of the Conservative Party.

Coldwell was born in Darlington Township, Durham County, Canada West (now Ontario). He moved with his family to Hullett Township in Huron County in 1860, and lived on his parents’ farm until he was twenty-one years old. He was educated at public schools in Kilburn, at Trinity College School in Port Hope, and at Trinity College in Toronto. He received a Bachelor of Arts degree from the latter institution, and entered the office of Holmstead & McCaughey in Seaforth as a law student. He also worked for Foy & Tupper in Toronto before moving to Manitoba in 1882, where he completed his legal studies at the firm of Kennedy & Sutherland in Winnipeg. He was called to the bar in November 1882, and briefly practiced in Winnipeg before moving to Brandon in February 1883. He joined T.M. Daly in a law business, and continued this partnership for twelve years before forming the firm of Coldwell, Coleman & Curran.

Coldwell was involved in Brandon municipal affairs, and was a member of the Brandon City Council for twenty years.

Coldwell was also active in a variety of community pursuits. He was rector warden at the Anglican Church. He was a founder of the Brandon Opera House Company and a director of the Brandon Winter Fair. He was active in the Law Society of Manitoba and the founding of the Union of Manitoba Municipalities.

He entered provincial politics in 1907, following the death of Brandon's Member of the Legislative Assembly (MLA) Stanley McInnis. McInnis had been Provincial Secretary and Municipal Commissioner in Roblin's government. Coldwell was appointed as McInnis's successor in cabinet on November 14, 1907 and entered the legislature by winning a by-election in Brandon City a few days later. Coldwell was elected by acclamation (without opposition).

Coldwell was also named Minister of Education on March 14, 1908, and stepped down as Provincial Secretary on November 6 of the same year. He was easily re-elected in the 1910 election.

In 1912, Coldwell introduced a series of amendments to the province's education act. He insisted these were only meant to clarify existing provisions, but many Manitobans believed that the Roblin government wanted to reintroduce funding for separate Catholic schools. The issue cost the government support in the 1914 provincial election, which they won with a reduced majority. Coldwell was personally re-elected, defeating Liberal candidate Stephen Emmett Clement by 163 votes.

In 1915, the Roblin administration was forced to resign from office after a report commissioned by the Lieutenant Governor found the government guilty of corruption in the tendering of contracts for new legislative buildings. Coldwell resigned from cabinet on May 12, and was not a candidate in the general election that followed.

Coldwell was indicted on charges of fraud for his role in the contracts scandal, but the first trial resulted in a hung jury and charges against Coldwell were later dropped.

He died in Brandon in 1924 at the age of 65.

The Rural Municipality of Coldwell was named for him.
