= Edmond Prefontaine =

Canadian politician (1898–1971)

Member of the Manitoba Legislative Assembly for Carillon
- In office 1935–1962
- Preceded by: Albert Prefontaine
- Succeeded by: Leonard Barkman

Personal details
- Born: July 18, 1898 St. Pierre, Manitoba, Canada
- Died: October 9, 1971 (aged 73) Quebec City, Quebec, Canada
- Party: Liberal-Progressive
- Parent: Albert Prefontaine (father)

Edmond Préfontaine (July 18, 1898 in St. Pierre, Manitoba – October 9, 1971) was a politician in Manitoba, Canada. He served in the Legislative Assembly of Manitoba as a Liberal-Progressive from 1935 to 1962, and was a cabinet minister in the government of Douglas L. Campbell. His father, Albert Préfontaine, had previously served in the Assembly for twenty-nine years, and was a cabinet minister in John Bracken's government.

Fluently bilingual, Préfontaine was educated at the University of Manitoba and received a Bachelor of Arts degree in 1918. He worked as a farmer, and as a breeder of pure Holsteins. He also served as director of the Winnipeg District Milk Producers Cooperative Association.

The Préfontaines were prominent Franco-Manitoban family in the Conservative Party during World War I. Although popular opinion among Canadian francophones was generally against the war, Edmond Préfontaine enlisted for service on May 12, 1918, following his graduation. He spent four months at the Petawawa Training Camp, and might have served overseas had the war not come to an end. After the war, the Préfontaines left the Conservative Party for the United Farmers of Manitoba, and later for the Liberal-Progressives.

After Albert Préfontaine died in 1935, Edmond campaigned to succeed him in the rural constituency of Carillon. He was successful, defeating his sole opponent, Louis-P. Gagnon, by 155 votes. A Liberal-Progressive, he was a backbench supporter of Bracken's government.

Préfontaine was re-elected in the 1936 and 1941 provincial elections, and won without opposition in 1945. From 1940 to 1950, Manitoba was governed by a multi-party coalition dominated by the Liberal-Progressives, and also including the Progressive Conservatives. Préfontaine was a supporter of the coalition for many years, but crossed to the opposition benches in 1949.

In the 1949 election, Préfontaine campaigned as an Independent Liberal opposing the coalition government. He was again re-elected, defeating government candidate H.B. Johnson by 600 votes. During this period, he described the coalition as damaging to the British system of parliamentary government.

Préfontaine rejoined the government side in 1950, as the coalition was coming to a close. He was appointed to Campbell's cabinet as Municipal Commissioner on December 1, 1951. This position was restructured on April 20, 1953, and Préfontaine was sworn in as the province's first Minister of Municipal Affairs. In the 1953 provincial election, he described a vote for the Liberal-Progressives as a vote for "progress plus sanity" (Winnipeg Free Press, 21 May 1953).

Easily returned as a Liberal-Progressive candidate in the 1953 election, Préfontaine was given the additional portfolio of Provincial Secretary on September 4, 1953. He held both cabinet positions until June 30, 1958, when the Campbell government resigned from office.

Lloyd Stinson, leader of the Manitoba CCF, once described Préfontaine as an "independent spirit", and claimed he never seemed comfortable in the Campbell administration.

Préfontaine was re-elected in the 1958 election. The Liberal-Progressives, who in one form or another had governed Manitoba since 1915, were defeated by Dufferin Roblin's Progressive Conservatives in this election, and Préfontaine moved with his party to the opposition benches. He was again re-elected in the 1959 election, but did not run in 1962.

Préfontaine's son, René Préfontaine, was also active in politics, though ironically as a supporter of Roblin's Progressive Conservatives. It was on Edmond's advice that René turned down an offer to join the Roblin cabinet in 1959.

Préfontaine died in Quebec City in 1971 following a lengthy illness.
