= John Wesley Greenway =

Canadian politician

John Wesley Greenway (August 27, 1861 – April 24, 1928) was a Canadian civil servant and politician. He served as a Member of the Northwest Territories Council beginning in 1921 and also served as Commissioner of Dominion Lands for the Department of the Interior.

== Early life ==
Greenway was born on August 27, 1861, in Bervie, Canada West. He was the eldest son of Thomas Greenway a prominent early Canadian politician. His family moved west to Manitoba in 1878 settling on a 1,000-acre stead. Greenway took over management of the farm after his father was elected to the Manitoba Legislature in 1879.

In 1885 Greenway married his only wife Elizabeth Daly, but she died of illness before she was able to have children. Greenway joined the civil service in 1898 with his appointment as Inspector for School Lands with the Manitoba Government.

== Civil service career ==
The federal government appointed Greenway Commissioner of Dominion Lands after John Gillanders Turriff was appointed to the Senate in 1904. On April 20, 1921, by virtue of his position in the Department of the Interior Greenway was appointed to the re-emerging Northwest Territories Council which had been reconstituted for the first time since 1905. Greenway served on the council until his death on April 24, 1928.
