= Clifford Sifton =

Canadian lawyer and politician (1861–1929)

The Honourable Sir Clifford Sifton KCMG, PC, KC
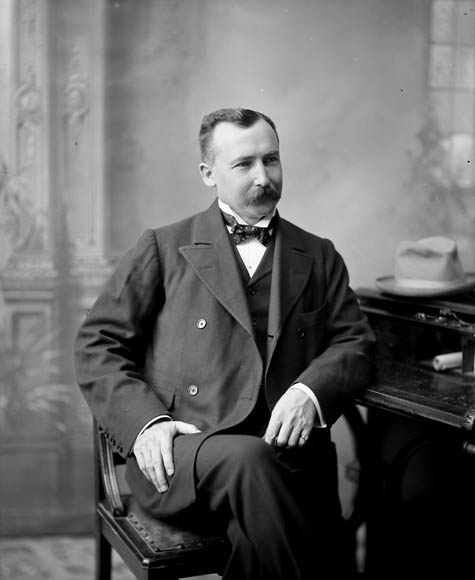

Minister of the Interior
- In office November 17, 1896 – February 28, 1905
- Preceded by: Hugh John Macdonald
- Succeeded by: Frank Oliver

Member of Parliament for Brandon
- In office November 27, 1896 – September 20, 1911
- Preceded by: D'Alton McCarthy
- Succeeded by: James Albert Manning Aikins

Personal details
- Born: March 10, 1861 Middlesex County, Canada West
- Died: April 17, 1929 (aged 68) New York City, New York, U.S.
- Party: Liberal
- Spouse: Elizabeth Armanella Burrows
- Children: 5 sons
- Relatives: Arthur Sifton (brother), Theodore Arthur Burrows (brother-in-law)

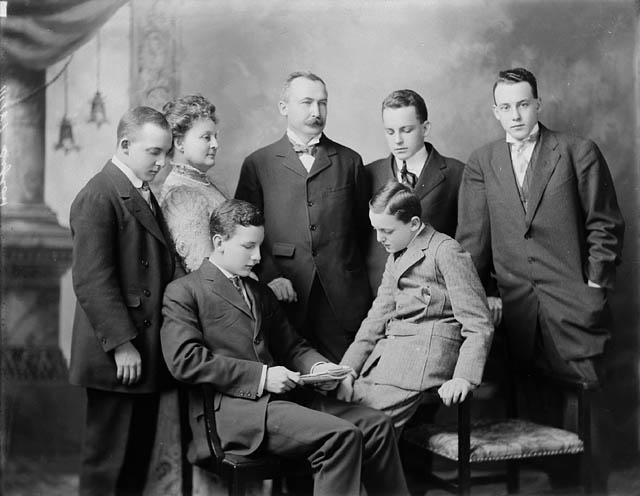
Sifton and his family in 1910

Sir Clifford Sifton, KCMG, PC, KC (March 10, 1861 – April 17, 1929), was a Canadian lawyer and a long-time Liberal politician. He was best known for being Minister of the Interior in 1896 to 1905, under Sir Wilfrid Laurier. He was responsible for encouraging the massive amount of immigration to Canada which occurred during the first decade of the 20th century. In 1905, he broke with Laurier and resigned from cabinet over the issue of publicly funded religious education in the new provinces of Alberta and Saskatchewan.

== Early life ==
Sifton was born in Middlesex County, Canada West (now Ontario). Sifton's father, John Wright Sifton, was a contractor and businessman who moved with his family to Manitoba when Sifton was a boy.

Sifton trained as a lawyer and graduated from Victoria University in the University of Toronto, where he was the founding manager of Acta Victoriana.

== Political career ==
=== Manitoba provincial politics: Attorney General for Manitoba ===
Sifton worked on his father's political campaigns before being himself elected to the legislative assembly of Manitoba in 1888. Sifton served in the cabinet of Thomas Greenway from 1891 to 1896 as attorney general and Provincial Lands Commissioner. He played a role in negotiating the Laurier-Greenway Compromise, which temporarily resolved the Manitoba Schools Question.

=== Federal politics: Minister of the Interior ===
In 1896, Sifton was first elected a Member of Parliament after being acclaimed in a by-election in Brandon. He was re-elected in the 1900 Canadian federal election against a strong challenge from former Manitoba premier Hugh John Macdonald. Sifton would be re-elected two more times, in 1904 and 1908.

Sifton was appointed Minister of the Interior under Laurier and implemented a vigorous immigration policy called "The Last Best West" to encourage people to settle and populate the West. Sifton established colonial offices in Europe and the United States. He enticed people to come to western Canada. While many of the immigrants came from Britain and the United States, there was also, to Canada, a large influx of Ukrainians, Scandinavians, Doukhobors from Russia, and other groups from the Austro-Hungarian Empire. He famously defended the "stalwart peasants in sheep-skin coats" who were turning some of the most difficult parts of the western plains into productive farms.

Between 1891 and 1914, more than three million people came to Canada, largely from continental Europe, following the path of the newly constructed transcontinental railway. In the same period, mining industries were begun in the Klondike and the Canadian Shield.

After presiding over the creation of Alberta and Saskatchewan in 1905, Sifton resigned from cabinet following a dispute with Laurier over religious education.

Especially later in his life, Sifton battled increasing deafness, which precluded any further potential political advances.

== Later life ==
Sifton retired from politics in 1911 but crusaded against the government policy of reciprocity, because he believed that increased economic integration between Canada and the United States would result in Canada being taken over by the Americans.

Having fallen out with Laurier earlier, Clifford Sifton was a major broker that facilitated the inclusion of many provincial Liberal leaders in Robert Borden's Unionist government during the Conscription Crisis of 1917. While he himself was not part of the resulting ministry, his brother Arthur, Premier of Alberta at the time who have declared in 1914 his staunch support of conscription was a member.

A sometimes repeated assertion on immigration policy, that "a stalwart peasant in a sheep-skin coat, born on the soil,[...]is good quality," was made in a 1922 article he wrote.

Sifton died in 1929 in New York City, where he had been visiting a heart specialist. He left a fortune estimated at $3.2 million, equivalent to about $60 million in present-day terminology. Sifton is buried at Mount Pleasant Cemetery, Toronto.

== Family ==
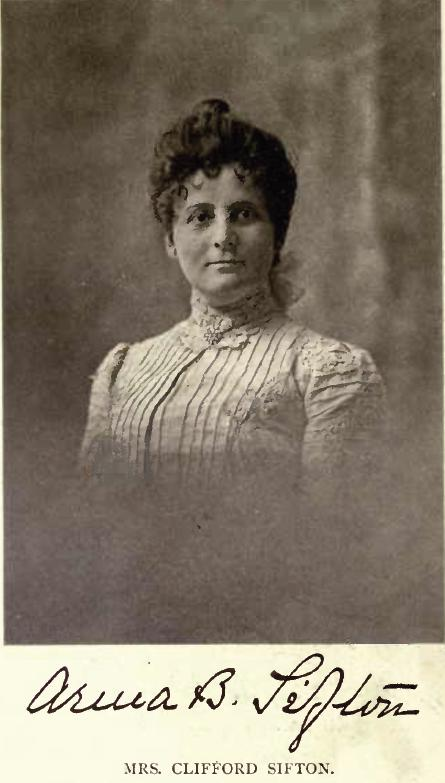
Mrs. Clifford Sifton in 1903, by William James Topley

Sifton, then a young lawyer, was married in Winnipeg, Manitoba, on August 18, 1884, to Elizabeth Armanella Burrows (1862-1925). She was the daughter of Henry James Burrows and his wife, Sarah Sparks. Elizabeth was born in Ottawa, Ontario, and educated at the Ottawa Ladies' College. She founded and presided over the Woman's Christian Temperance Union (WCTU) in Brandon, Manitoba.

The couple had five sons.

- John Wright Sifton (1886–1932)
- Winfield Burrows Sifton (1890–1928)
- Henry Arthur "Harry" Sifton (1891–1934)
- Wilfred Victor Sifton (1897–1961)

His brother-in-law Theodore Arthur Burrows would also serve as a Liberal MP in the Laurier government, and he was later appointed the tenth Lieutenant Governor of Manitoba.

His brother Arthur Sifton served as the second Premier of Alberta.

== In popular culture ==
Brad Austin portrays Sifton in episode 15 of season 13 "The Trial of Terrence Meyers" (February 10, 2020) of the Canadian television period detective series Murdoch Mysteries.

== Archives ==
There is a Clifford Sifton fonds at Library and Archives Canada.

Parliament of Canada
Preceded by D'Alton McCarthy	Member of Parliament for Brandon; 1896–1911	Succeeded by James Albert Manning Aikins
