= John Black (clergyman) =

John Black (8 January 1818 – 11 February 1882) was a Presbyterian clergyman who had emigrated from Scotland to New York State.

After a time in the United States preparing himself for the ministry, Black attended Free Church's college (later Knox College) in Toronto. He became an ordained minister and was a reluctant placement at the Red River Colony. He arrived there in 1851 and, in 1853, married a local girl, the daughter of Alexander Ross.

At Red River Black worked with the Presbyterian congregation who were mainly of Scottish descent and, because of a good knowledge of French, became interested in the Métis and Indian population. During the Riel conflicts, he attempted to mediate between the English- and French-speaking interests in the settlement. He was a key person in the creation of Manitoba College and was the first moderator of the Presbyterian Church in Manitoba. Later in his life he received an honorary dd from Queen's College in Kingston.

Black had a second marriage to the sister of Andrew Graham Ballenden Bannatyne.
