= Duncan Lloyd McLeod =

Canadian politician (1874–1935)

Duncan Lloyd McLeod (May 26, 1874 – May 10, 1935) was a politician in Manitoba, Canada. He served in the Legislative Assembly of Manitoba from 1922 to 1935 as a member of the Progressive Party, and was a cabinet minister in the government of John Bracken.

McLeod was born in Glen Huron, Ontario, and was educated at Collingwood Collegiate Institute. He worked as a teacher, and continued in this profession after moving to Manitoba in 1902. McLeod served a councillor and reeve in the municipality of Albert, and was active in various farming organizations.

He first campaigned for the Manitoba legislature in the provincial election of 1920, when he lost by ten votes to Liberal incumbent John Williams in the rural southwestern constituency of Arthur. McLeod ran as an independent farmer candidate, and might have also been endorsed by the local Conservative organization.

He later joined the United Farmers of Manitoba. Under its banner, he defeated Williams by 353 votes in the 1922 election. The United Farmers won an unexpected majority in this election, and formed government as the Progressive Party. McLeod was appointed as Manitoba's Provincial Secretary and Municipal Commissioner on August 8, 1922. He gave up the former position on December 3, 1923.

McLeod was re-elected in the 1927 election, defeating Conservative challenger J. Arthur Ross by 324 votes. He was retained as Municipal Commissioner, and was appointed Provincial Secretary for a second time on December 31, 1929. On May 27, 1932, he was also appointed as Manitoba's Railway Commissioner.

McLeod defeated Ross again in the 1932 election, and was retained in all three cabinet positions. He was still a member of the government at the time of his death in Winnipeg in 1935.
