= Department of Intergovernmental Affairs =

Office of Government

In many Canadian provinces, a Department of Intergovernmental Affairs or a Ministry of Intergovernmental Affairs is a cabinet-level agency charged with relations between the province and other provinces, the federal government and, in some cases, foreign governments.

In 2021, the federal government appoints a Minister of Intergovernmental Affairs, but this minister does not head an independent department, being instead a member of the Privy Council Office.

== See also ==
- Department of Intergovernmental Affairs (New Brunswick)
- Ministry of Intergovernmental Affairs (Manitoba)
