= Samuel Clarke Biggs =

Canadian politician

Member of the Legislative Assembly of Manitoba
- In office 1878–1879

Personal details
- Born: 8 October 1851 Ancaster, Canada West
- Died: 27 September 1911 (aged 59)

Samuel Clarke Biggs (8 October 1851 – 27 September 1911) was a Canadian politician in the province of Manitoba.

Born in Ancaster, Wentworth County, Canada West, the son of Richard Biggs and Eleanor Wood, Biggs was educated at Victoria College in Cobourg, and the University of Toronto where he received a Bachelor of Arts degree in 1872. He studied to be a lawyer and was made a King's Counsel in 1884. He moved to Winnipeg in 1875 and became the head of the law firm of Biggs, Dawson and Curran. From 1878 to 1879, he was a member of the Legislative Assembly of Manitoba and was Minister of Public Works in 1879. In 1878, he helped to establish The Winnipeg Daily Sun. He moved to Saint Paul, Minnesota, and then returned to Toronto.
