= Municipal Commissioner (Manitoba) =

The Office of the Municipal Commissioner was government department in the Canadian province of Manitoba.

Established by the government of John Norquay in 1887, the office was restructured by the Douglas Campbell government as the Ministry of Municipal Affairs in 1953, after taking on increased responsibilities.

The longest-serving Municipal Commissioner was Duncan Lloyd McLeod, who held the position for almost 13 years.

== List of Municipal Commissioners in Manitoba ==
Name	Party	Took office	Left office
Alexander Murray	Independent	July 7, 1887	April 30, 1888
James Allan Smart	Liberal	April 30, 1888	January 7, 1893
John Donald Cameron	Liberal	January 13, 1893	January 6, 1900
Hugh John Macdonald	Conservative	January 10, 1900	October 29, 1900
Colin H. Campbell	Conservative	October 29, 1900	December 20, 1900
David H. McFadden	Conservative	December 20, 1900	June 26, 1907
Stanley McInnis	Conservative	June 26, 1907	November 4, 1907
George Coldwell	Conservative	November 14, 1907	May 12, 1915
James William Armstrong	Liberal	May 12, 1915	August 8, 1922
Duncan Lloyd McLeod	Progressive	August 8, 1922	May 27, 1932
Duncan Lloyd McLeod	Liberal-Progressive	May 27, 1932	May 8, 1935
Ewan McPherson	Liberal-Progressive	May 10, 1935	September 21, 1936
William James Major	Liberal-Progressive	September 21, 1936	November 22, 1939
William Morton	Liberal-Progressive	November 22, 1939	December 14, 1948
Sauveur Marcoux	Liberal-Progressive	December 14, 1948	November 16, 1951
Edmond Prefontaine	Liberal-Progressive	December 1, 1951	April 20, 1953
