= Thomas Gilroy (Canadian politician) =

Canadian politician

His Worship Thomas Gilroy
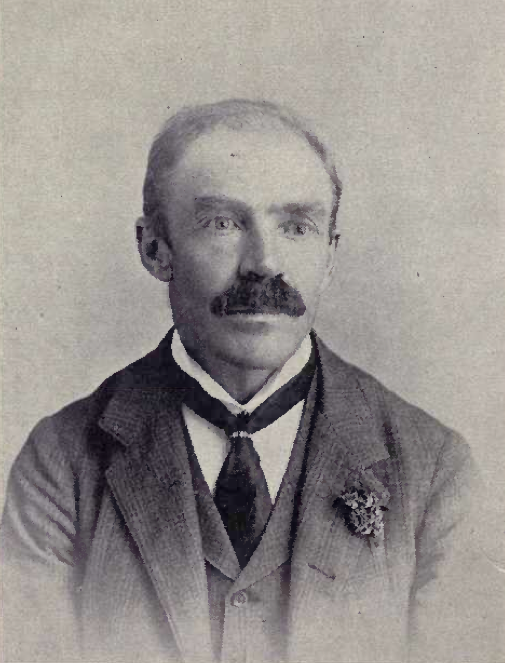

14th Mayor of Winnipeg
- In office 1895–1895

Personal details
- Born: 16 October 1848 Norfolk County, Canada West
- Died: 22 February 1905 (aged 56) Winnipeg, Manitoba, Canada
- Spouse: Beatrice Groff

Thomas Gilroy (16 October 1848 – 22 February 1905) was a Canadian politician, the 14th Mayor of Winnipeg in 1895.

Gilroy was born in Norfolk County, Canada West. In 1872 he joined the Sun Life Assurance company, supervising its Ontario operations. He moved west in 1882 to be Sun Life's manager for the North-West region, including Winnipeg.

He attempted to enter provincial politics by campaigning in the 1888 Manitoba election at the Centre Winnipeg riding, but was defeated by Daniel Hunter McMillan. In 1891, he became a City of Winnipeg alderman, and was elected mayor in 1894.
