= Daniel Hunter McMillan =

Canadian politician (1846–1933)

The Honourable Sir Daniel Hunter McMillan KCMG
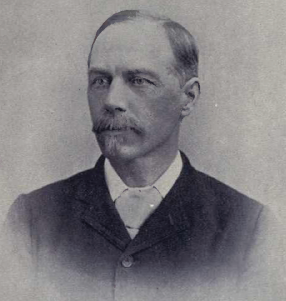

7th Lieutenant Governor of Manitoba
- In office October 10, 1900 – August 1, 1911
- Monarchs: Queen Victoria; Edward VII; George V
- Governors General: The Earl of Minto; The Earl Grey
- Premier: Hugh John Macdonald; Rodmond Roblin
- Preceded by: James Colebrooke Patterson
- Succeeded by: Douglas Colin Cameron

Personal details
- Born: January 14, 1846 Whitby, Canada West
- Died: April 14, 1933 (aged 87)

Sir Daniel Hunter McMillan, KCMG (January 14, 1846 – April 14, 1933) was a Manitoba politician. He was a cabinet minister in Thomas Greenway's government from 1889 to 1900, and served as the seventh Lieutenant Governor of Manitoba from 1900 to 1911.

== Biography ==
McMillan was born in Whitby, Canada West (now Ontario), and was educated there and at Collingwood. His initial career goal was to be a professional soldier. He saw active service on the Niagara frontier in 1864, and was an officer with the 19th Lincoln Battalion of Infantry involved in repelling the Fenian raids of 1866. In 1870, he served in the expedition of Col. Wolseley which ended the Red River Rebellion. Staying in Manitoba, McMillan would be one of the founding officers of the 90th Winnipeg Battalion of Rifles in 1883. When the North-West Rebellion broke out in 1885, McMillan became a Major with the newly formed 95th Battalion of Infantry (Manitoba Grenadiers) and later was promoted to Lieutenant Colonel on June 17, 1887. In 1904, McMillan would be appointed Colonel of the 12th Manitoba Dragoons.

McMillan settled in Winnipeg following the Wolseley expedition, and became a successful businessman within the city. He established a milling and grain business in Winnipeg in 1874, and oversaw the first shipment of western Canadian wheat to Minneapolis shortly thereafter. He also served as the first president of the Winnipeg Grain Exchange for one year (1887–1888), served too as a Director and later vice-president of the Great-West Life Assurance Company.

McMillan became politically active during this period. In 1879, he ran for the Manitoba legislature in the riding of Winnipeg against Thomas Scott, the leader of the opposition to John Norquay's government. Norquay was supported by both Liberals and Conservatives at the time, and McMillan was a prominent member of the Winnipeg Liberal community. Despite strong backing from the Manitoba Free Press, however, he lost to Scott by 387 votes to 321.

The 1879 election was unusual even by the standards of early Manitoba politics, in that both Norquay and Scott claimed the support of a majority of elected members after the results were announced. Eventually, Norquay consolidated his hold over the government and Scott departed for federal politics. On December 4, 1880, McMillan was elected for Winnipeg in a by-election, defeating Alexander Logan.

Norquay would gradually break his ties with the Winnipeg Liberals over the next two years, and forged an alliance with the province's Conservative establishment in 1882. It may be assumed that McMillan had crossed into the opposition by this time. He was never a cabinet minister under Norquay, and did not run for re-election in 1883.

Thomas Greenway's Liberals were called to form a government in January 1888, and won a landslide majority in a general election held later in the year. McMillan was returned to parliament for the riding of Winnipeg Centre in this election, defeating Conservative Thomas Gilroy by 972 votes to 470. He was not immediately called into Greenway's cabinet, but was named Provincial Treasurer on May 7, 1889. He held this position for the remainder of Greenway's time as Premier, and was given the additional portfolio of Provincial Lands Commissioner on October 7, 1896. He had no difficulty being re-elected in 1892, and won unopposed in 1896.

Greenway's Liberals were defeated by the Conservatives under Hugh John Macdonald in 1899, although McMillan retained his seat over Conservative A.J. Andrews by 1364 votes to 1249. On October 9, 1900, he was appointed as the Lieutenant-Governor of Manitoba by Canadian Prime Minister Wilfrid Laurier. The post was mostly ceremonial by this time, and McMillan had little practical influence over the governments of Macdonald and Rodmond Roblin. He was knighted in 1902 and stepped down from the Lt. Governor's position in 1911.
