= 2009 Manitoba provincial by-elections =

Two provincial by-elections were held in the Canadian province of Manitoba on March 24, 2009 to fill vacancies in the Legislative Assembly of Manitoba. Both were won by the governing Manitoba New Democratic Party.

== Elmwood ==
The electoral district of Elmwood became vacant in fall 2008 when incumbent New Democratic Party MLA Jim Maloway resigned from the legislature to run as the federal New Democratic Party candidate in Elmwood—Transcona in the 2008 federal election.

Bill Blaikie, the former MP whose retirement from federal politics opened up the NDP candidacy in Elmwood—Transcona, subsequently announced his intention to stand in the provincial by-election. Two other candidates, Ed Innes and Darryl Livingstone, had submitted nomination papers, but both dropped out before the nomination meeting, and Blaikie was acclaimed as the party's candidate on December 14, 2008. The Manitoba Progressive Conservative Party chose Adrian Schulz, a 25-year-old businessman who left high school at 14 to start his first computer business, the Manitoba Liberal Party chose Regan Wolfrom, a community activist, and the Green Party of Manitoba candidate was James Beddome, who was selected as the party's new leader in 2008.

Blaikie won the by-election, marking the first time in his 30-year political career that he will be serving in a governing party caucus rather than an opposition role.

Manitoba provincial by-election, March 24, 2009: Elmwood Resignation of Jim Maloway
Party	Candidate	Votes	%	±%	Expenditures
New Democratic	Bill Blaikie	2,325	53.76	-7.75	$17,603.25
Progressive Conservative	Adrian Schulz	913	21.11	0.10	$15,919.78
Liberal	Regan Wolfrom	877	20.28	2.79	$27,106.33
Green	James R. Beddome	210	4.86	–	$1,115.73
Total valid votes		4,325	–	–	
Rejected		14	–		
Eligible voters / turnout		11,907	36.44	−13.54	
Source(s) Source:

== The Pas ==
The electoral district of The Pas became vacant with the death of incumbent New Democratic MLA Oscar Lathlin on November 1, 2008. The by-election was won by Frank Whitehead, a former chief of the Opaskwayak Cree Nation, who ran for the New Democrats.

The Liberal candidate was Maurice Berens, a high school teacher from Norway House, and the Progressive Conservatives selected Edna Nabess, a clothing store owner in The Pas.

Manitoba provincial by-election, March 24, 2009: The Pas Death of Oscar Lathlin
Party	Candidate	Votes	%	±%	Expenditures
New Democratic	Frank Whitehead	2,949	75.11	6.25	25,898.41
Progressive Conservative	Edna Nabess	722	18.39	-3.06	31,676.75
Liberal	Maurice Berens	255	6.50	-3.19	9,255.99
Total valid votes		3,926	–	–	
Rejected		23	–		
Eligible voters / turnout		13,334	29.44	–	
New Democratic hold		Swing		+4.66	
Source(s) Source: "2009 The Pas Byelection Results" (PDF). Elections Manitoba.
