= Maitland Steinkopf =

Canadian politician (1912–1970)

Maitland Steinkopf OC MBE QC

Manitoba Provincial Secretary
- In office October 8, 1964 – July 22, 1966
- Premier: Dufferin Roblin
- Succeeded by: Stewart McLean
- In office June 12, 1963 – August 24, 1964
- Premier: Dufferin Roblin
- Preceded by: Gurney Evans

Manitoba Minister of Public Utilities
- In office October 8, 1964 – July 22, 1966
- Premier: Dufferin Roblin
- Preceded by: Sterling Lyon
- Succeeded by: Stewart McLean
- In office June 12, 1963 – August 24, 1964
- Premier: Dufferin Roblin
- Preceded by: Sterling Lyon
- Succeeded by: Sterling Lyon

Member of the Legislative Assembly of Manitoba for River Heights
- In office December 14, 1962 – 1966
- Preceded by: W. B. Scarth
- Succeeded by: Sidney Spivak

Personal details
- Born: Maitland Bernard Strauss Steinkopf; September 10, 1912 Winnipeg, Manitoba, Canada
- Died: November 22, 1970 (aged 58) Winnipeg, Manitoba, Canada
- Party: Progressive Conservative Party of Manitoba
- Spouse: Helen Katz (m. 1947)

Maitland Bernard Strauss Steinkopf OC MBE QC (September 10, 1912 – November 22, 1970) was a politician in Manitoba, Canada. He was a Progressive Conservative member of the Legislative Assembly of Manitoba from 1962 to 1964, and again from 1964 to 1966. Steinkopf was a cabinet minister in the government of Dufferin Roblin, the first Jewish cabinet minister in Manitoba.

== Biography ==
Born at Winnipeg on September 10, 1912, son of Max Steinkopf (1881–1935) and Hedwig Meyer, he graduated in law from the University of Manitoba in 1936. As a student he had organized the athletic board of control and was vice-president of the students' union. Steinkopf was called to the Manitoba Bar in December 1936. He succeeded his father as honorary consul for Czechoslovakia in 1937. He served in the Canadian Forces in World War II, as a private in the Queen's Own Cameron Highlanders and a lieutenant colonel with the Royal Canadian Ordnance Corps. He served as chairman of a special committee of the Manitoba Legislative Assembly on consumer credit in 1966. He was Chancellor of Brandon University from 1967 to 1970. He was chairman of the Manitoba Centennial Corporation from 1963 until his death of a heart attack on Sunday, November 22, 1970.

He founded the Canada West Shoe Manufacturing Company, and was a president of several companies including Bonded Investments Ltd., L.H. Packard Co. Ltd., Dayton Shoe Mfg. Col. Ltd., and the Tel Aviv Hilton Hotel. Steinkopf was a member of the Canada Israel Development Corporation, and served as chairman of State of Israel bonds in Manitoba. He was also an honorary counsel with the government of Czechoslovakia until 1948. Prior to his election, he assisted the Roblin government in land-development for cultural projects.

Steinkopf was elected to the Manitoba legislature in the 1962 provincial election, defeating Liberal Roy Matas by over 1,000 votes in the upscale Winnipeg riding of River Heights. He was appointed to cabinet on June 12, 1963, as Provincial Secretary and Minister of Public Utilities.

In 1964, Steinkopf was implicated in controversial a land assembly payment. Although Premier Roblin later referred to the matter as an innocent technical breach, it was considered serious enough for Steinkopf to resign his position and his seat in the legislature. He was re-elected in a by-election on September 30, and was re-appointed to cabinet on October 8.

During the flag debates of the 1960s, Steinkopf favoured a design competition for a new provincial flag.

Steinkopf did not run for re-election in 1966. He later served as chairman of the Manitoba Centennial Centre Corporation from 1963 until his death of a heart attack on Sunday, 22 November 1970. The Manitoba Centennial Centre Corporation later established the Maitland Steinkopf Youth Fund in 1972 for students in the arts.

In 1947, he married Helen Katz of Chicago and they had six children.

He received a Manitoba Centennial Medal from the Manitoba Historical Society (1970), and was inducted into the Manitoba Order of the Buffalo Hunt (1961) and the Order of Canada (1970).

He died on Sunday, November 22, 1970, from a heart attack.

== See also ==
- Politics of Canada

Academic offices
New office	Chancellor of Brandon University; 1967–1970	Succeeded by Stanley Knowles
