= Provincial Secretary (Manitoba) =

Ministerial position in Manitoba

The position of Provincial Secretary was particularly important in Manitoba from 1870 to 1874, as that province's institutions were being established. The province had no Premier during this period, and its Lieutenant-Governor acted as the de facto leader of government. The early Provincial Secretaries (including Alfred Boyd and Henry Joseph Clarke) were the most prominent elected officials in the province, and are retrospectively regarded as Premiers in many modern sources.

== List of Provincial Secretaries ==
- Alfred Boyd September 16, 1870–December 14, 1871
- Marc-Amable Girard 1871-1872
- Thomas Howard 1871-1872
- Henry Joseph Clarke 1872-1874
- Joseph Royal 1872-1874
- Marc-Amable Girard 1874
- John Norquay 1875-1876
- Corydon Partlow Brown 1878-1879
- Marc Amable Girard 1879-1881
- Alphonse Alfred Clement Riviere 1881-1883
- Alexander MacBeth Sutherland 1883-1884
- David Henry Wilson 1884-1886
- Corydon Partlow Brown 1886-1887
- John Norquay 1886-1887
- Joseph Burke 1887-1888
- James Emile Pierre Prendergast 1888-1889
- Daniel Dennis McLean 1889-1892
- John Donald Cameron 1893-1896
- Charles Julius Mickle 1895-1900
- David Henry McFadden 1900-1907
- Stanley William McInnis 1908
- George Robson Coldwell KC 1907-1908
- James Henry Howden 1908-1915
- Rodmond Palen Roblin 1911-1913
- William James Armstrong 1915-1922
- Duncan Lloyd McLeod 1922-1923
- Charles Reginald Lionel Cannon 1927
- Donald Gordon McKenzie 1928-1929
- Duncan Lloyd McLeod 1929-1935
- John Bracken 1935-1939
- John Stewart McDiarmid 1939-1946
- Charles Edwin Greenlay 1946-1948
- Wallace C. Miller 1948-1950
- Charles Edwin Greenlay 1950-1953
- Edmond Prefontaine 1953-1958
- Marcel Boulic 1958-1959
- John Benson Carroll 1959
- Edward Gurney Vaux Evans 1959-1963
- Maitland Steinkopf 1963-1966
