= David H. Wilson (politician) =

Canadian politician (1855–1926)

David Henry Wilson (October 2, 1855 – December 10, 1926) was a physician and political figure in Manitoba. He represented Dufferin North from 1881 to 1888 in the Legislative Assembly of Manitoba as a Conservative.

He was born in Huntley Township, Canada West, the son of Thomas Wilson, and was educated in Pakenham and at Trinity College. Wilson practised medicine in Winnipeg for a few months in 1879 and then moved to Nelson. He was a founding member of the Manitoba Medical College, later the faculty of medicine at the University of Manitoba.

He was first elected to the provincial assembly in an 1881 by-election held after Andrew Laughlin was named registrar. Wilson served in the Manitoba cabinet as Provincial Secretary and Minister of Public Works. He married Annie E. Armstrong in 1887. He served as coroner for Marquette County and was secretary-treasurer for the North Dufferin Agricultural Society.

In 1889, Wilson returned to the practice of medicine in Vancouver, retiring in 1894. He was the first president of the Vancouver Medical Association and was vice-president of the British Columbia Permanent Loan Company, the Pacific Coast Fire Insurance Company and the Royal Plate Glass Insurance Company. Wilson died in Vancouver at the age of 71.
