= Rodmond Roblin =

Canadian businessman and politician

Sir Rodmond Palen Roblin KCMG
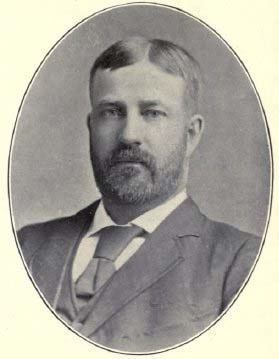

9th Premier of Manitoba
- In office October 29, 1900 – May 12, 1915
- Monarchs: Victoria; Edward VII; George V
- Lieutenant Governor: Daniel Hunter McMillan; Douglas Cameron
- Preceded by: Hugh John Macdonald
- Succeeded by: Tobias Norris

Member of the Legislative Assembly of Manitoba for Dufferin
- In office March 12, 1888 – July 23, 1892
- Preceded by: District created
- Succeeded by: District eliminated
- In office July 20, 1903 – August 6, 1915
- Preceded by: District recreated
- Succeeded by: Edward August

Member of the Legislative Assembly of Manitoba for Woodlands
- In office January 15, 1896 – July 20, 1903
- Preceded by: Hugh Armstrong
- Succeeded by: District abolished

Personal details
- Born: February 15, 1853 Sophiasburgh, Prince Edward County, Canada West
- Died: February 16, 1937 (aged 84) Hot Springs, Arkansas
- Spouse: Adelaide DeMille (m. 1875; died 1928) Ethel Leggett (m. 1929)
- Relations: Dufferin Roblin (grandson)
- Children: Frederick Roblin (1876–?); Wilfrid Laurier Roblin (1878–1952); James Platt Roblin (1883–1890); Arthur Bettram Roblin (1885–1950); George Aubrey Roblin (1887–1941); Charles Dufferin Roblin (1892–1973)
- Education: Albert College
- Occupation: businessman
- Profession: politician
- Cabinet: President of the Council (1900–1915); Railway Commissioner (1900–1907); Minister of Agriculture (1900–1911); Provincial Lands Commissioner (1905–1915); Railway Commissioner (1908–1915); Provincial Secretary (1911–1913)

Sir Rodmond Palen Roblin KCMG (February 15, 1853 – February 16, 1937) was a businessman and politician in Manitoba, Canada.

== Early life and career ==
Roblin was born in Sophiasburgh, in Prince Edward County, Canada West (later Ontario). The Roblin family was established in Sophiasburgh by the Loyalist farmers Philip and Elizabeth Roblin from Smith's Clove (now known as Monroe) in Orange County, New York. He was educated at Albert College in Belleville, arrived in Winnipeg in 1877, and worked as a grain merchant. Roblin served as reeve of Dufferin for five years and as warden for two and was also a school trustee in the community.

He entered provincial politics in the 1886 Manitoba election, running as a Liberal Party candidate against the Conservative cabinet minister David H. Wilson in the constituency of Dufferin North. He lost the race by five votes but won a subsequent by-election held on May 12, 1888.

The by-election took place shortly after Thomas Greenway had been inaugurated as Manitoba's first Liberal premier. Roblin was then a supporter of Greenway and was re-elected by acclamation when the new premier called another provincial election for July 1888.

Although Greenway's Liberals won the election with a landslide majority, the new premier was unable to fulfill a campaign promise for the development of local railways. The Canadian Pacific Railway had lost its formal monopoly in the region, but it remained the dominant line, and transportation costs remained high. Confronted with Greenway's failure, Roblin abandoned the government in 1889 and caucused with the small Conservative opposition. With the death of John Norquay in the same year, Roblin emerged as the party's leading spokesman and was the Conservative Party's de facto leader in the legislature between 1890 and 1892.

In opposition, Roblin spoke against Greenway's proposed education reforms. After his failure to reform the provincial railway system, Greenway repudiated an earlier pledge and withdrew state support for Manitoba's Catholic and francophone education system. His reforms triggered a national political crisis known as the Manitoba Schools Question. Many Canadian francophones regarded Greenway's policy as discriminatory, but it was extremely popular with Manitoba's anglophone and Protestant majority. Greenway's government was re-elected in the 1892 election, and Roblin was personally defeated in the rural constituency, including the town of Morden.

Greenway won another landslide victory in the 1896 election, but Roblin was this time returned to the legislature for the constituency of Woodlands. He became the parliamentary leader of the Conservatives for a second time but stood aside to allow Hugh John Macdonald to become the official leader of the party in 1897.

The 1899 provincial election was very different from the previous two campaigns. The schools question had been resolved in 1896, and Greenway was forced to defend a fairly-mediocre record on other issues against a more organized opposition. The result was a narrow victory for Macdonald's Conservatives, who won 22 of 40 seats. Macdonald was inaugurated as premier early in 1900. Roblin, who was re-elected in Woodlands, but despite being was the main architect of the Conservative victory, he was left out of cabinet.

== Premiership ==
Macdonald resigned as premier on October 29, 1900, to run for the Conservative Party of Canada against Clifford Sifton in the federal riding of Brandon. Roblin became premier in his place and also took the powerful cabinet position of Railway Commissioner. In December, he also appointed himself as Minister of Agriculture. That consolidation of power reflected Roblin's personal authority over both the government and the provincial Conservative Party: his control over both would be unquestioned for 14 years.

While Greenway had won elections on single-issue populism, Roblin relied on machine politics for his electoral success. Despite (or because of) some coercion, he was able to effectively dispense patronage and could rely on the support of many loyal followers at the community level.

Roblin's Conservatives won 31 seats in the 1903 election against 9 for Greenway's Liberals. The extent of that victory may be credited to Greenway's leadership of the Liberal Party since he was increasingly uninterested in provincial politics and was spending much of his time looking for a federal patronage appointment. Roblin's machine also coasted to easy victories in 1907 and 1910 by winning 28 of 41 seats on both occasions.

Roblin played a crucial role in the 1911 federal election on reciprocity by putting his electoral machine at the disposal of the federal Conservative Party. Roblin thus helped to defeat Sir Wilfrid Laurier and put Robert Borden in power. Borden in turn enacted legislation to expand Manitoba's boundaries to their current limit.

Like his counterpart James Whitney, in Ontario, Roblin expanded the role of government in Manitoba and promoted many initiatives that would be regarded today as progressive. As railway commissioner, he reached an agreement with Canadian Northern Railways to build an alternate route to the lakehead, and he put control of the rates into the hands of the province. His government also promoted significant, expansions in health, education, and road services, all of which were required to service Manitoba's rapidly-increasing population.

Roblin created Manitoba's first crown corporations by expropriating Bell's telephone services to create a state-owned system, the first effective public utilities system in Canada. The government also started a state-owned system of grain elevators to assist farmers, but that was less successful. A scandal involving the elevators weakened his government's hold on power in the early 1910s.

Roblin was more conservative on social issues. He is often remembered today for his opposition to women's suffrage and for clashing with Nellie McClung on the issue. McClung made Roblin appear foolish in her famous "parliament of women" parodying the premier's patronizing comments on traditional gender roles. Roblin also resisted demands to enact a labour code to protect workers and was sometimes reluctant to enforce the province's existing legislation.

Roblin is also remembered for folding to pressure from Winnipeg's business community. In 1904, he took the step of reducing the ages for child labour and increasing the maximum hours of work for women and children.

Roblin's handling of the prohibition issue was also controversial. Macdonald's government had passed prohibition legislation in 1900, after two separate referendums had confirmed public support for the initiative. Roblin was reluctant to enforce the legislation, however, because his government received significant revenues from the sale of alcohol. He called a third referendum in 1902. When temperance supporters boycotted the poll, prohibition was defeated by a narrow margin.

The 1914 provincial election was the start of a watershed period in Manitoba politics. Roblin's government went into the election weakened by a scandal involving the construction of new legislative buildings. His opponents accused the government of corruption and claimed misappropriation of funds and overspending. The Conservatives were re-elected by a reduced margin by winning 28 seats against 20 for the Liberals in an expanded legislature.

When Roblin rejected calls for a formal investigation into the legislative buildings scandal, the Liberal opposition petitioned the Lieutenant Governor to take direct action. The Lieutenant-Governor convened his own commission of enquiry, popularly known as the Mathers Commission, as it was led by Chief Justice T.A. Mathers. After only two weeks, the commission had uncovered enough evidence to force the government's resignation. Roblin formally resigned as premier on May 12, 1915, and the Liberal leader, Tobias Norris, was called to form a new administration. A new general election was called, which the Liberals won a landslide.

== Later life ==
The commission's report concluded that Roblin, Attorney General James H. Howden, and the developer Thomas Kelly had conspired to commit fraud in the contract arrangements. Roblin was indicted but was eventually discharged of criminal responsibility. He died in Hot Springs, Arkansas, in 1937.

He was the paternal grandfather of Dufferin Roblin, premier of Manitoba from 1958 to 1967, through his youngest son, Charles D. Roblin.
