= Andrew Laughlin =

Canadian politician (1844–1916)

Andrew Laughlin (October 8, 1844 – March 25, 1916) was a banker and political figure in Manitoba. He represented Dufferin North from 1879 to 1881 in the Legislative Assembly of Manitoba as a Conservative.

He was born in Ontario and came to Manitoba in 1877. Laughlin married Rachel Bell. He served as registrar at Nelson. Laughlin resigned his seat in the Manitoba assembly when he was named registrar. He also was a banker in Cartwright. Laughlin died in Winnipeg at the age of 71.

His son John later served in the Manitoba legislature.
