= Joseph Burke (politician) =

Canadian politician

Joseph Burke (November 12, 1853 – after 1888) was a land surveyor and political figure in Manitoba. He represented St. Francois Xavier from 1886 to 1888 in the Legislative Assembly of Manitoba as a Conservative.

He was born in Saint-Jean-Port-Joli, Quebec, the son of Walter Burke, a native of Ireland, and Mary Comeford, and was educated at Ste. Anne's College, at Montmagny Business College and at McGill University. Burke qualified as a provincial land surveyor for Quebec in 1874. He served as a lieutenant in the Quebec militia during the Fenian raids. From 1877 to 1879, he was director of surveys for Richelieu County. Burke moved to Manitoba in 1880, where he spent three years subdividing townships. He then opened his own business in St. Charles. Burke was named Provincial Secretary in December 1887 but was defeated by Frederick Francis when he ran for reelection in January of the following year. The defeat of Burke in this by-election was regarded as a loss of the right to govern by the Conservatives and led to the Liberals forming a government.
