= Frederick Francis (Canadian politician) =

Canadian politician

Frederick Henhurst Francis (c. 1845–1895) was a Canadian merchant and political figure in Manitoba. He represented St. Francois Xavier in 1888 in the Legislative Assembly of Manitoba as a Liberal.

He came to Manitoba and operated a store in Headingley. Francis married Sarah Margaret, the daughter of John Black, a Presbyterian clergyman. He was elected to the provincial assembly in an 1888 by-election held after Joseph Burke was named to the Manitoba cabinet. Francis was elected in a largely Roman Catholic and francophone riding based on promises from the Liberals that separate schools in the province would be protected. Two years later, legislation was introduced abolishing separate schools in Manitoba.

Francis died in Headingley.
