= 1886 Manitoba general election =

- December 9, 1886

35 seats in the Legislative Assembly of Manitoba 18 seats needed for a majority
- Registered: 45,373
- Turnout: 50.3%
	First party	Second party
Party	Progressive Conservative	Liberal
Seats won	20	15
Popular vote	10,995	10,305
Percentage	50.9%	47.7%

The 1886 Manitoba general election was held on December 9, 1886. As a result of the election, 20 Progressive Conservative MLAs were elected, and 15 were Liberals.
