= 1892 Manitoba general election =

Manitoban Election

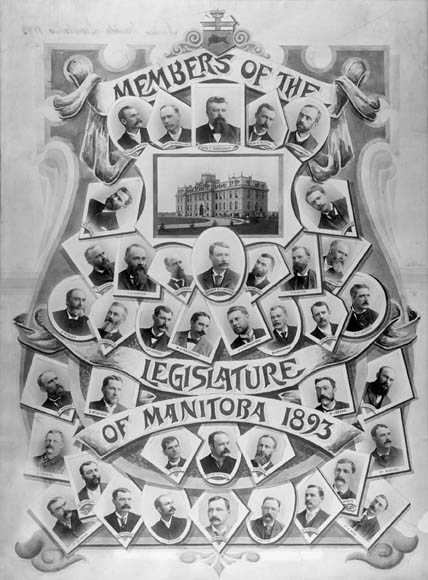
Members of the Legislature of the Province of Manitoba, 1893

The 1892 Manitoba general election was held on July 23, 1892. The Liberals, led by Thomas Greenway, won with 28 out of 40 seats.
