= 1888 Manitoba general election =

- July 11, 1888

The 1888 Manitoba general election was held on July 11, 1888.
