= Thomas Greenway =

Canadian politician

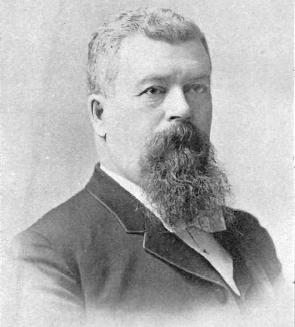

7th Premier of Manitoba
- In office 19 January 1888 – 10 January 1900
- Monarch: Victoria
- Lieutenant Governor: James Cox Aikins; John Christian Schultz; James C. Patterson
- Preceded by: David Howard Harrison
- Succeeded by: Hugh John Macdonald

Member of Parliament for Huron South
- In office 11 February 1875 – 17 September 1878
- Preceded by: Malcolm Colin Cameron
- Succeeded by: Malcolm Colin Cameron

Member of Parliament for Lisgar
- In office 3 November 1904 – 30 October 1908
- Preceded by: Duncan Alexander Stewart
- Succeeded by: William Henry Sharpe

Member of the Legislative Assembly of Manitoba for Mountain
- In office 16 December 1879 – 3 November 1904
- Preceded by: first member
- Succeeded by: Daniel A. McIntyre

Personal details
- Born: 25 March 1838 Kilkhampton, United Kingdom
- Died: 30 October 1908 (aged 70) Ottawa, Ontario
- Party: Liberal
- Spouses: Annie Hicks (m. 1860) Emma Essery (m. 1877)
- Relations: John Wesley Greenway (son)
- Children: 14
- Occupation: merchant and farmer
- Profession: politician
- Cabinet: Minister of Agriculture (1888–1900); President of the Council (1888–1900); Railway Commissioner (1891–1900)

Thomas Greenway (25 March 1838 – 30 October 1908) was a Canadian politician, merchant and farmer. He served as the seventh premier of Manitoba from 1888 to 1900. A Liberal, his ministry formally ended Manitoba's non-partisan government, although a de facto two-party system had existed for some years.

== Early life ==
Greenway was born in Kilkhampton, UK, emigrating to Canada with his family in 1846. He was a Methodist in religion. His eldest child John Wesley Greenway was born on 27 August 1861. Greenway moved his family west in 1878 to a 1000-acre stead in Manitoba.

== Political career ==
Greenway began his political career in Ontario, contesting Huron South for the Conservative Party in 1872. He narrowly lost to Liberal candidate Malcolm Colin Cameron, and suffered the same result in 1874. Cameron's 1874 victory was overturned for illegal campaign activities, however, and Greenway was elected unopposed the following year. He entered parliament as an "Independent Conservative", in opposition to Alexander Mackenzie's Liberal government. He was also an active Methodist lay preacher.

Greenway's affiliation with the Conservative Party was always tenuous. He opposed protectionism, and in 1876 voted for the budget of Liberal Finance Minister Richard John Cartwright. He generally favour the Liberals for the remainder of his time in parliament (though continuing to sit as an Independent), and stood aside in favour of Cameron in 1878.

Greenway moved to Manitoba in 1879, having acquired a large tract of land in the province's southwestern corner (with financial backing from Cameron). He was the founder of Crystal City, Manitoba. When a provincial election was held on 16 December of that year, he was elected unopposed in the riding of Mountain. Greenway again referred to himself as an "Independent Conservative", and sought to represent his constituents in the manner of an independent country politician; however, he soon became known as a leading opponent of John Norquay's government.

When Prime Minister John A. Macdonald disallowed Manitoba's local railway legislation in 1882, Greenway formed an opposition group known as the Provincial Rights Party, which ran 15 candidates in the provincial election of 1883. Although it did not achieve immediate success (Norquay's government won 21 of 30 seats), it emerged as the most powerful voice on the opposition side. Greenway had to fend off a personal challenge from premier Norquay, who ran as a candidate in Mountain as well as his own riding of St. Andrew's. If Norquay hoped to silence the strongest opposition voice by this tactic, he was unsuccessful: Greenway won the riding by 330 votes to 244.

The Provincial Rights group subsequently consolidated the non-government MLAs into the Manitoba Liberal Party — rather to the chagrin of some Winnipeg Liberals, who were suspicious of Greenway's rural base. Some ex-parliamentary "Provincial Rights" groups merged in the same period. These faded away after a few public protests, but Greenway's control over the provincial Liberal organization soon became unchallengeable.

The Liberals believed they had a chance to win the provincial election of 1886, and in fact, received about as many votes as Norquay's Conservatives. A personal visit from John A. Macdonald boosted Conservative strength, however, and Norquay's government won roughly 21 seats compared to 14 for the opposition. Greenway himself faced a surprisingly strong challenge in Mountain, defeating Conservative candidate R. Rogers by 385 votes to 370.

=== Premier of Manitoba ===
Norquay was unable to maintain his alliance with John A. McDonald and resigned after losing the support of his ministers in December 1887. When his successor David Howard Harrison proved unable to command a parliamentary majority, Greenway was asked by the Lieutenant Governor to form a new administration in January 1888. Through by-election wins and defections, he was able to sustain a stable administration before calling new elections in mid-year.

Greenway's Liberal administration was tolerated by John A. Macdonald, who once claimed in private correspondence that he preferred Greenway to Norquay. The Premier's commitment to "liberalism" in the Canadian context was no stronger than his commitment to "conservatism" ten years earlier. As an administrator, he remained an independent figure unbothered by questions of ideology. Perhaps the only thing that Greenway unambiguously stood for in 1888 was provincial railway rights: when he assumed power, he promised to be more successful in securing these rights than the Norquay administration had been.

Greenway was extremely fortunate, in this sense, that his term began just as the Canadian Pacific Railway voluntarily ended its provincial monopoly over rail travel, subject to hefty compensation from the federal government. He rode a wave of popular support to a landslide election victory in the 1888 campaign, taking 33 seats against 5 for the Conservatives. No Conservative even challenged Greenway in Mountain.

Greenway, however, was unable to resolve the railway issue. His administration mishandled negotiations for a new connection to the United States, and the CPR's continued to dominate the region. Transportation rates remained high, and provincial development suffered accordingly. One of Greenway's legislative supporters, Rodmond Palen Roblin, bolted to the Conservative opposition in disgust.

After failing in railway reform, Greenway turned his attention to education. His controversial reforms of Manitoba's school system provoked a national crisis in the 1890s, and are still regarded as his administration's most notable accomplishment.

When Manitoba was created in 1870, the provincial government established a dual school system to reflect the province's demographic balance. The Manitoba Act of 1870 and School Act of 1871 provided for separate and equally funded Catholic and Protestant school boards. These boards were divided by language as well as religion: the province's original Catholic population was predominantly francophone, while its Protestant population was almost exclusively anglophone.

The demographics of Manitoba changed considerably between 1870 and 1888. Protestants came to outnumber Catholics by a significant margin, and the dual system was regarded by many new settlers as an anachronism. Many anglophones, both Conservative and Liberal, resented the continued state funding for French-language education. Greenway sought to appeal to these voters in 1890 by abolishing the dual system and setting up a single Department of Education. Also in 1890, Greenway's Liberals enacted legislation to unilaterally abolish the province's obligation to ensure all its law were bilingual, doing away with French-language legislation. This was declared illegal by two lower court decisions, which the Province ignored. In 1984, the federal Government referred the question to the Supreme Court of Canada, which held Greenway's actions had been unconstitutional. The Court forced Manitoba to translate all its legislation into French, a job that took seven years to complete.

Under Greenways's anti-French and anti-Catholic education legislation of 1890, while Catholic schools were allowed, but they were denied state funding; parents who sent their children to Catholic schools were required to contribute to their secular board as well. These reforms were popular with Protestants, particularly among the evangelical faiths. Greenway's government was re-elected in the 1892 election, winning 28 seats to approximately 12 for the opposition. Greenway personally defeated Rogers for the second time in Mountain.

This election did not bring an end to the education issue. Greenway's legislation brought about a complex series of legal cases, as well as threats of disallowance from various levels of government. The resulting controversy (known as the Manitoba Schools Question) dominated Canadian politics in the mid-1890s, and divided both the Conservatives and Liberals on the national level.

In 1895, after the Privy Council refused to decide the matter, Conservative Prime Minister Mackenzie Bowell passed remedial legislation defending Catholic rights. Greenway responded by calling another election and again presented himself as the champion of provincial rights against federal intrusion. The result, on 15 January 1896, was another Liberal landslide victory — Greenway's Liberals won 31 seats, compared with 6 for the still-leaderless Conservatives (the Patrons of Industry, an upstart third party, were sidelined by the education controversy and won only 2 seats). These results were a significant blow to the federal Conservatives, who soon withdrew their remedial legislation. Bowell stood aside as national Conservative leader, leaving a weakened and badly divided party in his wake.

Shortly thereafter, the federal Liberals under Wilfrid Laurier won a national election, and resolved the Schools Questions with a mild compromise (providing minimal state support for Catholic and French education on a case-by-case basis). Greenway's efforts to introduce secular education into the province were successful, and the Laurier government's bid for further concessions in later years came to nothing.

The resolution of the education issue did not benefit Greenway's chances for re-election, however. No longer able to benefit from protest votes, the Liberals were defeated by the Conservatives under Hugh John Macdonald (son of the former Prime Minister) in late 1899. Many voters were apprehensive about recent East European immigration into the province, and were offended by even the minor concessions which Greenway had made on the education question; the Conservative Party was able to tap into this xenophobia, and won 22 seats out of 40. Greenway reluctantly returned to the leadership of the opposition, and sought a patronage appointment to cap off his career. An attempt for an early Senate promotion came to nothing, and he continued to lead the Liberals in a desultory fashion through the election of 1903 (wherein his party won only 9 of 40 seats).

=== Post-premiership, federal politics, and death ===
Greenway returned to federal politics in 1904, winning election for the Manitoba riding of Lisgar. Although his loyalty to the Liberal Party was now unquestioned, he accomplished very little in Ottawa and continued to spend most of his time seeking out a comfortable sinecure. In 1908, he finally received an appointment to the expanded Board of Railway Commissioners. However, he suffered a fatal heart attack on the day that he was scheduled to be sworn in.

== Legacy ==
Greenway remained a controversial figure for much of the twentieth century. Some regarded his education reforms as discriminatory toward minority groups; others (including some in the social gospel and secular left) saw him as a champion of the public school system in western Canada. Since the rise of official bilingualism in the 1960s, Greenway's reputation has fallen somewhat.

== Electoral record ==
1904 Canadian federal election: Lisgar
Party	Candidate	Votes
Liberal	Thomas Greenway	1,657
Conservative	William Henry Sharpe	1,477
