= List of Manitoba government departments and agencies =

This list of Manitoba government departments and agencies shows the names and periods of activity for departments of the provincial Government of Manitoba, along with their respective agencies, boards, and commissions.

== Current departments and agencies ==
Manitoba departments, 2023
Name	Areas of concern	Formed	Minister (Min.)	Notable agencies / organizations	Precursor
Manitoba Advanced Education and Training	Higher education; Immigration	2021	Min. Advanced Education and Training: Minister of Labour and Immigration	Apprenticeship Manitoba; Campus Manitoba; Louis Riel Institute; Manitoba Provincial Nominee Program; Manitoba Student Aid; Post-secondary governing boards: Assiniboine Community College; Brandon University; MITT; Red River College; Universite de Saint-Boniface; University College of the North (governing council); University of Manitoba; University of Winnipeg (regents)	Dept. of Advanced Education and Literacy; Dept. of Education and Advanced Learning; Dept. of Advanced Education, Skills and Immigration
Manitoba Agriculture	Agriculture; Farming; Animal welfare	2016	Min. Agriculture	(Note: Manitoba also has three positions on the Prairie Agriculture Machinery Institute Board of Directors, which belongs to the Government of Saskatchewan.): Agricultural Services Corp.; Agriculture Research and Innovation Committee (MARIC); Animal Care Appeal Board; Appeal Tribunal; Association of Agricultural Societies; Farm Industry Board; Farm Management Canada; Farm Products Marketing Council; Freshwater Fish Marketing Corp.; Habitat Heritage Corp.; Prairie Provinces Water Board; Surface Rights Board; Veterinary Medical Association Council; Veterinary Services Commission; Women’s Institute Provincial Board	Manitoba Agriculture, Food and Rural Initiatives (2003–2016)
Public Service Delivery: Manitoba Public Service Commission	Consumer protection; Competition; Government procurement, IT, and infrastructure	2019	Min. Consumer Protection and Government Services: Min, responsible for the Public Utilities Board and Public Service Commission	Public Guardian and Trustee of Manitoba; Public Utilities Board; Residential Tenancies Branch	Manitoba Labour, Consumer Protection and Government Services; Manitoba Consumer Protection and Government Services
Manitoba Business, Mining, Trade and Job Creation (BMTJC)	Business and economic development; Employment; Workforce		Min. Economic Development, Investment and Trade	RBC Convention Centre; Communities Economic Development Fund; Economic Development Winnipeg; Manitoba Development Corporation; Research Manitoba; Rural Manitoba Economic Development Corporation	Dept. of Economic Development and Training Dept. of Economic development and Jobs
Manitoba Education and Early Childhood Learning	Public education (K-12); child care	2016	Min. Education	Board of Reference; Child Care Qualifications and Training Committee; Dispute Resolution Review Committee; Public Schools Finance Board; Student Advisory Council; Teachers’ Retirement Allowances Fund (TRAF) Board	Dept. of Education, Citizenship and Youth
Manitoba Environment and Climate	Environmental protection; Natural resource use; Water stewardship; Waste management	1928	Min. Environment and Climate	Certification Advisory Committee; Clean Environment Commission; Ecological Reserves Advisory Committee; Efficiency MB; Endangered Species Advisory Committee; Expert Advisory Council; Hazardous Waste Management Corporation Board; Watershed Districts Boards	Dept. of Sustainable Development (1999) founded as Dept. of Mines and Natural Resources
Department of Families: Accessibility Compliance Secretariat; Status of Women Secretariat; Francophone Affairs Secretariat	Child & family services; Accessibility & disabilities; Housing	2016	Min. Families: Minister responsible for Accessibility; Minister responsible for the Status of Women; Minister responsible for Francophone Affairs	Accessibility Advisory Council; Adult Abuse Registry Committee; Manitoba Developmental Centre; Francophone Affairs Advisory Council; Manitoba Housing; Women’s Advisory Council	Dept. of Family Services (2016); Dept. of Children and Youth Opportunities (2016); Dept. of Housing and Community Development
Manitoba Finance: Crown Services Secretariat	Finance; Crown corporations		Min. Finance: Min. responsible for Manitoba Hydro; Min. responsible for MPI	Manitoba Bureau of Statistics; Funeral Board of Manitoba; Manitoba Hydro; Labour Board; Landlord and Tenant Advisory Committee; Manitoba Liquor & Lotteries; Manitoba Public Insurance; Public Utilities Board; Residential Tenancies Commission; Manitoba Securities Commission; Treasury Board Secretariat; Vital Statistics Agency; Workers Compensation Board	
Manitoba Health	Healthcare; Pharmacare; Dental care	2016	Min. Health	Addictions Foundation of Manitoba; Adolescent Treatment Centre; Association of Optometrists; Assoc. of Registered Respiratory Therapists; CancerCare Manitoba; Chiropractors Association; College of... (Note: These institutions are named "College of __ of Manitoba"); Audiologists and Speech Pathologists; Dental Hygienists; Dietitians; Licensed Practical Nurses; Medical Laboratory Technologists; Occupational Therapists; Pharmacists; Physicians and Surgeons; Physiotherapists; Registered Nurses; Registered Psychiatric Nurses; Dental Association; Denturist Association of Manitoba – BOD; Drug Standards and Therapeutics Committee of Manitoba; Health Appeal Board; Health Information Privacy Committee; Health Professions Advisory Council; Hearing Aid Board; Institute for Patient Safety; Mental Health Review Board; Rehabilitation Centre for Children; Sanatorium Board of Manitoba; Seven Oaks General Hospital; Regional Health Authorities (Interlake-Eastern, Northern, Prairie Mountain, Southern Health-Santé Sud, Winnipeg)	Health and Seniors Care
Indigenous Reconciliation and Northern Relations	Indigenous–government relations; Northern Manitoba	2016	Min. Indigenous Reconciliation and Northern Relations		Dept. of Indigenous and Municipal Relations; Manitoba Aboriginal and Northern Affairs
Intergovernmental Affairs and International Relations: Manitoba Strategic Infrastructure Secretariat	Federal–provincial government relations; interprovincial government affairs; international relations; Crown–government relations		Min. Intergovernmental Affairs and International Relations		Dept. of Federal/Provincial Relations
Manitoba Justice	Justice		Minister of Justice and Attorney General	Community Notification Advisory Committee; Criminal Code Review Board; Horse Racing Commission; Human Rights Commission; Adjudicators; Board of Commissioners; Judicial Compensation Committee; Judicial Council; Judicial Inquiry Board; Law Foundation; Law Reform Commission; Legal Aid Management Council; Liquor, Gaming & Cannabis Authority of Manitoba (LGCA); Manitoba Police Boards; Manitoba Police Commission	Department of the Attorney General
Mental Health and Community Wellness	Mental health; Addictions and recovery; Wellness		Min. Mental Health and Community Wellness	Mental Health Review Board; Office of the Chief Provincial Psychiatrist; Selkirk Mental Health Centre	
Manitoba Municipal Relations	Provincial–municipal government relations	1953	Minister of Municipal Relations _{(previously Municipal Commissioner)}: Min. responsible for MLLC	Municipal Board; Office of the Fire Commissioner; Water Services Board; Board of Directors: CentrePort Canada; Keystone Centre; Forks North Portage Partnership (FNPP)	Dept. of Local Government; Dept. of Urban Affairs
Natural Resources and Northern Development	Natural resource development; Northern Manitoba development; Fishing and wildlife; Forestry; Parks; Conservation		Min. responsible for Natural Resources and Northern Development	Beverly and Qamanirjuaq Caribou Management Board; Conservation Agreements Board; Fish and Wildlife Enhancement Fund and Subcommittees; Resource Tourism Appeal Committee; Surface Rights Board; Whiteshell Advisory Board; Wildfire Suppression Services	
Seniors and Long-Term Care	Senior citizens; Long-term care		Min. Seniors and Long-term Care		Health and Seniors Care
Manitoba Sport, Culture and Heritage	Sport; Arts; Culture; Heritage	2016	Minister of Sport, Culture and Heritage	Advisory Council on Citizenship, Immigration and Multiculturalism; Manitoba Arts Council; Brandon Manitoba Centennial Auditorium; Centennial Centre Corporation; Centre Culturel Franco-Manitobain; Combative Sports Commission; Manitoba Film and Sound Recording; Heritage Council; Manitoba Museum; Public Library Advisory Board; Sport Manitoba; Winnipeg Art Gallery	Manitoba Culture, Heritage, Tourism and Sport
Manitoba Transportation and Infrastructure	Transportation; infrastructure	2016	Min. Transportation and Infrastructure	CentrePort Canada Inc. – BOD; Disaster Assistance Appeal Board; Land Value Appraisal Commission; Licence Suspension Appeal Board; Medical Review Committee	Department of Public Works; Department of Government Services

== Notable former departments and agencies ==
Name	Formed	Dissolved	Note
Aboriginal and Northern Affairs	1999	2016	Now Indigenous Reconciliation and Northern Relations
Agriculture, Food and Rural Initiatives: also Agriculture, Food and Rural Development		2016	
Business Development and Tourism also known as Ministry of Economic Development	1978	1988	
Growth, Enterprise and Trade	2016		
Healthy Living and Seniors		2016	As of 2023, the "healthy living" portfolio belongs to the Dept. of Mental Health and Community Wellness, while the "seniors" portfolio belongs to the Dept. of Seniors and Long-Term Care
Housing and Community Development		2016	
Indigenous and Municipal Relations	2016		
Industry, Trade and Technology	1983	1988	
Industry, Trade and Tourism	1988	1999	
Infrastructure and Transportation also known as: Highways and Government Services; Transportation and Government Services	1999	2016	
Jobs and the Economy		2016	
Labour and Immigration		2016	Labour and Immigration is no longer a department on its own. As of 2023, the immigration portfolio is part of the Dept. of Advanced Education, Skills and Immigration; former components of Labour have now been moved to different departments.
Mineral Resources		2016	
Multiculturalism and Literacy		2016	
Municipal Affairs	1953	1989	Now Municipal Relations
Water Stewardship: also Conservation and Water Stewardship		2016	Water stewardship and conservation falls under the Conservation and Climate portfolio.
Crown Services Secretariat	2016		Now part of the Department of Finance
