= Eileen Clarke =

Eileen Clarke may refer to:

- Eileen Clarke (Neighbours), a character on the soap opera Neighbours
- Eileen Clarke (politician), Canadian politician in Manitoba

== See also ==
- Aileen Hernandez (born Aileen Blanche Clarke, 1926–2017) American union organizer and civil rights activist
