= Politics of Manitoba =

- Coat of arms of Manitoba
- Polity type: Province within a federal parliamentary constitutional monarchy
- Constitution: Constitution of Canada

Legislative branch
- Name: Legislature: Legislative Assembly
- Type: Unicameral
- Meeting place: Manitoba Legislative Building, Winnipeg
- Presiding officer: Speaker of the Legislative Assembly

Executive branch
- Head of state
- Currently: King Charles III represented by Anita Neville, Lieutenant Governor
- Head of government
- Currently: Premier; Wab Kinew
- Appointer: Lieutenant Governor
- Cabinet
- Name: Executive Council
- Leader: Premier (as President of the Executive Council)
- Appointer: Lieutenant Governor
- Headquarters: Winnipeg

Judicial branch
- Court of Appeal
- Chief judge: Marianne Rivoalen
- Seat: Law Courts Building, Winnipeg

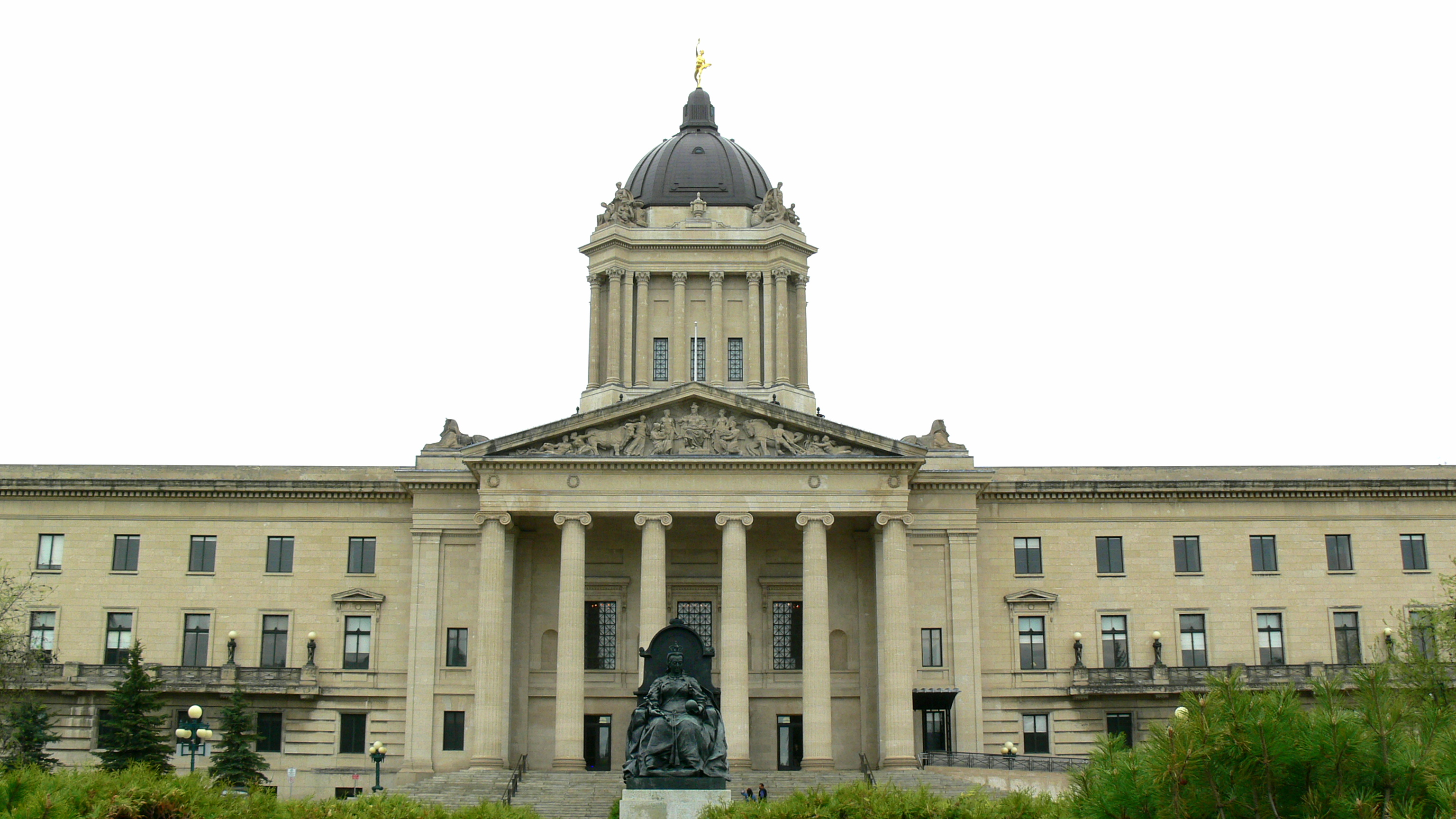
The Manitoba Legislative Building

The Province of Manitoba, similar to other Canadian provinces and territories, is governed through a Westminster-based parliamentary system. The Manitoba government's authority to conduct provincial affairs is derived from the Constitution of Canada, which divides legislative powers among the federal parliament and the provincial legislatures. Manitoba operates through three branches of government: the executive, the legislative, and the judicial. The executive branch—the Government of Manitoba—consists of the Executive Council and the Premier, who is the head of government and the President of the Executive Council. The legislative branch—the Manitoba Legislature—is composed of the Lieutenant Governor and the Legislative Assembly, which is composed of the 57 members (MLAs) elected to represent the people of Manitoba, as well as the Speaker, the Clerk, the Officers of the Legislative Assembly, and the employees of the legislative service.

The judicial arm consists of the Chief Justice and the judges who preside over the courts. These three branches are linked through the Crown, which is the head of state and represented by the Lieutenant Governor of Manitoba. Under section 23 of the 1870 Manitoba Act (which is part of the Constitution of Canada), both English and French are official languages of the legislature and courts of Manitoba.

Manitoba's primary political parties are the New Democratic Party (NDP) and the Progressive Conservative Party (PC). The premier of Manitoba is Wab Kinew, who leads the NDP with 34 seats. The last general election was held on October 3, 2023.

Manitoba is represented in federal politics by fourteen Members of Parliament and six Senators.

== Arms of Government ==
The Government of Manitoba uses a Westminster-based parliamentary system and has three levels of government: the executive, the legislative, and the judiciary.

These three branches are linked through the Crown, which is the head of state and represented by the Lieutenant Governor of Manitoba, who is appointed by the Governor General of Canada on advice of the Prime Minister.

Legislatures of Manitoba
Period	Parliament	Lower house	Upper house
1870–76	Legislature of Manitoba	Legislative Assembly of Manitoba	Legislative Council of Manitoba
1876–	Legislature of Manitoba	Legislative Assembly of Manitoba	N/A (abolished)

=== Legislative ===
In Canada, each provincial legislature is composed of the Lieutenant-Governor and the provincial legislative assembly. The Legislative Assembly consists of the 57 members (MLAs) elected to represent the people of Manitoba.

The Lieutenant Governor of Manitoba, who is appointed by the Governor General of Canada on advice of the Prime Minister, represents the head of state, the Crown. The head of state is primarily a ceremonial role, although the Lieutenant Governor has the official responsibility of ensuring that Manitoba always has a duly constituted government, with the authority to summon, prorogue, and dissolve the legislature.

In 1869, after the control of Rupert's Land was passed from Great Britain and the Hudson's Bay Company to the Government of Canada, Manitoba was split off of the North-Western Territory and was created as a province. It was given upper house (the Legislative Council) and a lower house, attaining full-fledged rights and responsibilities of self-government. The Legislative Assembly of Manitoba was established on 14 July 1870, and would first meet on 15 March 1871 in Fort Garry (now Winnipeg). In 1876, Manitoba abolished its upper house, thereby becoming a unicameral legislature. In 1920 it was the first province in Canada to adopt a form of proportional representation to elect part of its legislative assembly. In the 1950s it was the first province in Canada to adopt an independent electoral commission to draw the boundaries of electoral districts. In 1980, the Office of the Chief Electoral Officer was established to serve as an independent office of the Legislative Assembly for the purpose of administering fair elections

=== Executive ===
The executive branch (or cabinet) of Manitoba—the Executive Council—is formed by members who are appointed by the majority party in the Legislative Assembly. That party's leader is the Premier of Manitoba, and is both the head of government and the President of the Executive Council.

In addition to the Premier, the executive branch consists of government ministries and deputy ministers.

The Lieutenant Governor appoints and may dismiss the Premier and the members of their cabinets.

=== Judiciary ===
Manitoba's judiciary consists of three courts:

1. the Provincial Court — This court is primarily a criminal court; 95% of criminal cases in Manitoba are heard in this court.
2. the Court of King's Bench — This court is the highest trial court in Manitoba. It has four jurisdictions: family law (child and family services cases), civil law, criminal law (for indictable offences), and appeals for Provincial Court decisions.
3. the Court of Appeal — This court hears appeals from both the Court of King's Bench and the Provincial Court; decisions of this court can only be appealed to the Supreme Court of Canada.

== Official languages ==
Under section 23 of the 1870 Manitoba Act (which is part of the Constitution of Canada), both English and French are official languages of the legislature and courts of Manitoba.

With a provisional government set up by Métis leader Louis Riel in the Red River Colony—following the Red River Rebellion (or Resistance) against the federal Canadian government—Prime Minister John A. Macdonald decided to negotiate with Riel and his party. The provisional government drafted four successive lists of rights, the final version of which became the basis of federal legislation that created Manitoba: the Manitoba Act. In addition to demanding that Manitoba be admitted into Confederation as a province (rather than a territory), among other things, the final list also demanded that the lieutenant governor of the new province speak both French and English. Though Macdonald was reluctant, Manitoba entered Confederation as a province, and English and French-language rights were safeguarded in the new legislature and the courts. However, the right to education in either English or French was not protected by the Act.

In April 1890, the Manitoba Legislature ceased to publish bilingual legislation, as well as taking other courses of action in attempts to abolish the official status of French in the province. However, in Reference Re Manitoba Language Rights (1985), the Supreme Court of Canada ruled that Manitoba Act §23 still applied, and that legislation published only in English was invalid. (Unilingual legislation was declared valid for a temporary period to allow time for translation.)

Although French is an official language for the purposes of the legislature, legislation, and the courts, the Manitoba Act does not require it to be an official language for the purpose of the executive branch—except when performing legislative or judicial functions. The Government of Manitoba is therefore not completely bilingual. The Manitoba French Language Services Policy of 1999 was established with the intent to provide a comparable level of provincial government services in both official languages. According to the 2006 Census, 82.8% of Manitoba's population spoke only English, 3.2% spoke only French, 15.1% spoke both, and 0.9% spoke neither.

In 2010, the Government of Manitoba passed the Aboriginal Languages Recognition Act, giving official recognition to seven indigenous languages: Cree, Dakota, Dene, Inuktitut, Michif, Ojibway, and Oji-Cree.

== Federal politics ==
Manitoba is represented in federal politics by fourteen Members of Parliament and six Senators. At its inception, the province was allotted only four seats in the federal Parliament, which at the time allowed strong representation for Manitoba considering its small population.

Federal elections are administered by Elections Canada.

=== Confederation ===
Following the Red River Rebellion (or Resistance) against the federal Canadian government—with concern over Métis land rights, among other things—local people of the Red River Settlement (or Colony) demanded for a voice to create the terms under which the Colony would be incorporated into the newly formed Canada. As such, a popularly-elected convention supported the creation of a provisional government. This government, considered illegal by the federal government in Ottawa, was led by Louis Riel, himself a Métis. With a provisional government in place, Prime Minister John A. Macdonald decided to negotiate with Riel and his people. Riel's government drafted four successive lists of rights, the final version of which became the basis of federal legislation that created the Province of Manitoba: the Manitoba Act, which became part of the Constitution of Canada. Among other things, the final list demanded that Manitoba be admitted into Confederation as a province (rather than a territory). Though met with reluctance from Macdonald, Manitoba indeed entered Confederation as a province.

Centred on the area of Fort Garry, or present-day Winnipeg, the initial geography of Manitoba was much smaller—roughly 1,400,000 acres (5,700 km^{2}) of land were set aside for the Métis upon the Manitoba Act's passing. (Cf. Manitoba's total area today: 160,610,000 acres or 650,000 km^{2}.) The small population and size of the province made it unable to support itself financially. The federal government agreed to pay subsidies to the province, as well as grant it four seats in the federal Parliament.

== Political parties ==
Historically, political parties first appeared between 1878 and 1883, with a two-party system: Liberals and Conservative.

The United Farmers of Manitoba appeared in 1922, and later merged with the Liberals in 1932 to form the dominant political party. Other parties, including the Co-operative Commonwealth Federation (CCF), appeared during the Great Depression.

In the 1950s, Manitoban politics became a three-party system, and the Liberal party gradually declined in power. The CCF became the New Democratic Party (NDP), which came to power in 1969. Since then, the Conservatives, now the Progressive Conservative Party (PC), and the NDP have been the dominant parties.

Political parties/ideologies of Manitoba
Ideology	Party
Communism	Communist Party
Green politics	Green Party
Social democracy	New Democratic Party
Liberalism	Liberal Party
Conservatism	Progressive Conservative Party
Right-wing libertarianism	Manitoba First
Right-wing libertarianism	Manitoba Forward

== Provincial elections ==
The Elections Act
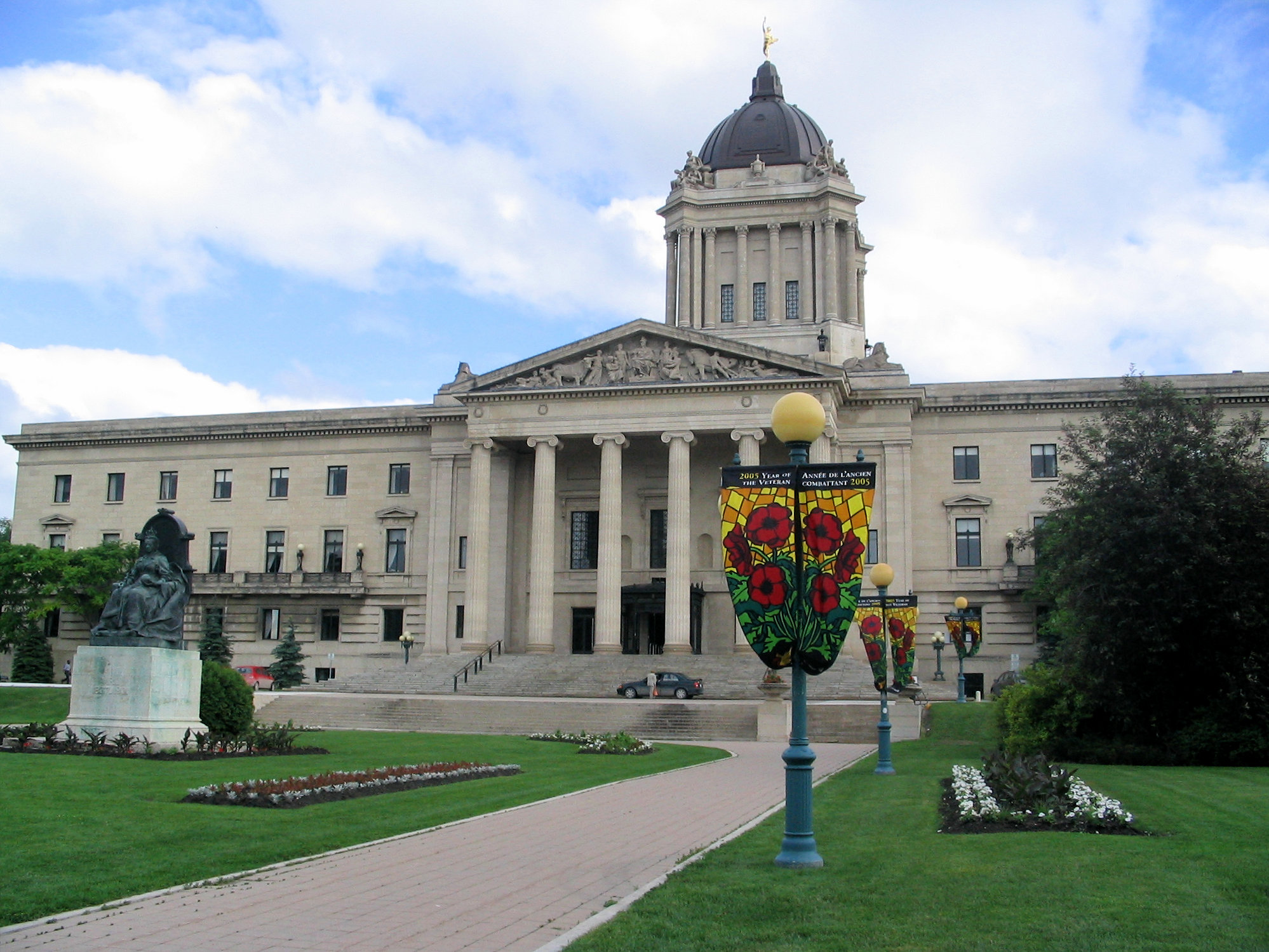

Legislative Assembly of Manitoba
- Citation: C.C.S.M. c. E30
- Territorial extent: Manitoba
- Enacted by: 4th Session, 38th Legislature
- Assented to: 13 June 2006

Amended by
- SM 2019, c. 22

Related legislation
- The Election Financing Act; The Electoral Divisions Act; The Legislative Assembly Act
- Status: Current legislation

In Manitoba, general elections to the Legislative Assembly are typically held every five years; however, the Lieutenant Governor is able to call one at any time. The last general election of Manitoba was held on 3 October 2023, four years after the one held on 10 September 2019.

These provincial elections are regulated by Elections Manitoba. Much like federal elections, Manitoba elections are administered by the province's Chief Electoral Officer (CEO), who is appointed by the Lieutenant Governor-in-council. The Office of the Chief Electoral Officer was established in 1980 to serve as an independent office of the Legislative Assembly and the Clerk of Executive Council. Obstructing the CEO would become an election offence as of 1998. Moreover, the CEO appoints the Commissioner of Elections, who carries sole investigation and prosecution responsibilities.

As of 2001, the CEO would also have the authority to appoint Returning Officers, which was originally a political appointment by Cabinet. Prior to 2001, in the case of a tie vote, the Returning Officer would be the one to cast the deciding ballot. Tie votes are now resolved through a by-election.

=== History of electoral system ===
In 1870, only males who were established members of the community and in good financial standing, could vote. At that time, voting took place at public constituency meetings, in which each voter would publicly declare his preference. There, the electoral officer would record the votes, and the simple plurality (i.e., first-past-the-post or FPTP) system was used to elect members for the 24 seats in the Legislative Assembly. In 1888, the requirement to be in "good financial standing" was eliminated, (Note: Elections Act 1888) and two years later, those receiving government salary of CA$350 or more could now vote. (Note: Manitoba Elections Act 1900)

In 1916, Manitoba became the first Canadian province to grant women the right to vote. (However it did not hold a general election until 1920 so its first woman MLA did not come first in Canada.)

A new system of representation was introduced in 1914, when Winnipeg was divided into three constituencies, each represented by two members, each of which was elected in separate contest. Two ballots, one for each seat in a district, were issued. No candidate could be listed on both ballots in a district. The districts outside Winnipeg meanwhile retained the plain FPTP system.

Manitoba's electoral system was again the center of innovation with the 1920 introduction of Single transferable vote, a proportional representation election system, in Winnipeg. This was the first time a PR system was used in a provincial election in Canada. In this system, the city was consolidated into a single constituency electing ten members; and voters cast one vote. Preferential votes were used to allow voters to mark back-up preferences. Voters had the right to indicate their preferences by putting a number beside candidates' names on the ballot paper (i.e., 1, 2, 3, etc.). The votes were counted using a method of counting provided via amendments to The Elections Act.

In 1924, the FPTP system in districts outside Winnipeg was replaced by alternative voting, where to be elected a candidate had to have a majority of the votes (or close to it). In constituencies with more than two candidates, voters cast transferable votes by ranking candidates by marking candidates' name on the ballot with a number - 1, 2, 3, etc. With the retention of STV in Winnipeg, the mixed STV/AV system was used in eight elections, until 1955. (In 1949 Winnipeg was redistricted.)

Advance voting was first introduced during the 1932 general election of Manitoba. (Note: Manitoba Elections Act 1931)

In 1949, (Note: Elections Act 1949) the single, ten-member constituency of Winnipeg was replaced by three constituencies, each represented by 4 members. As well, the constituency of St. Boniface was given two members, also elected by STV. IRV outside of Winnipeg and St. Boniface was retained.

Six years later, Manitoba dropped the mixed STV/AV system. The four multi-member districts were divided into single-seat districts, and there and everywhere elsewhere the election system switched to First past the post. Winnipeg, St. Boniface and two suburban districts were made into 20 single-member constituencies.

Manitoba was the first province in Canada with an independent boundaries commission in 1957, when the Electoral Divisions Boundaries Commission is formed. The Commission included three members until 2006, when the number was increased to five and the presidents of Brandon University and University College of the North were added.

The voting age was lowered in 1969 from 21 to 18.

In 1980, the Elections Finances Act (EFA) was proclaimed in Manitoba, (Note: The Election Financing Act, C.C.S.M. c. E27) introducing spending limits on advertising for candidates and parties; a tax-credit system for contributions to registered political parties and candidates; and provisions for financial disclosure of contributions and expenses. Three years later, it would be decided that election day is always to take place on a Tuesday. (Note: Elections Act 1982) In 1985, spending limits were expanded to include all expenses, rather than just advertising. Since then, definitions were clarified (e.g., the definition of election expense), exclusions were made (e.g., voluntarism from being an election expense), and provisions were added (e.g., making advance payments and assigning reimbursements) throughout the decades. Effective 1 July 1986, only Canadian citizens would be eligible to vote, which would exclude British subjects and landed immigrants.

In 1998, penalties for election offences were increased. Though spending limits for advertising were also eliminated that year, they would be reinstated in 2001. Five years later, in 2006, rewriting of the Elections Act would bring about significant changes to understanding Manitoba's electoral system. A set election date was established in 2008, with the first election set to take place on 4 October 2011, and subsequent elections to take place on the first Tuesday of October every four years. Also that year, election expense limits and election advertising expense limits for parties and candidates were increased; political parties were made entitled to public funding (called an 'annual allowance'), with a requirement of having to file a statement in order to receive that allowance; the ban on government advertising and publications was extended to 90 days prior to a set-date election; and thresholds were increased for fundraising-event ticket sales and on items sold for fundraising.

Enfranchisement in Manitoba
Date	Demographic
1916	Women
1932	First Nations persons in Armed Forces
1952	Manitoba's Treaty Indian population (Note: Manitoba Elections Act 1952, section 5, p. 51)

=== Seats won in past elections ===
The current Premier of Manitoba is Wab Kinew, who leads the New Democratic Party (NDP) with 34 seats. The Progressive Conservative Party (PC) holds 22 seats, and the Liberal Party with 1 seat; however, the Liberals do not have official party status in the Manitoba Legislature.

Seats in the Legislative Assembly
Date	Number of seats	Notes
1870	24 seats	
1892	40 seats (Note: Manitoba Electoral Divisions Act 1892, section 8, p. 27)	
1914	49 seats (Note: Manitoba Legislative Act 1914)	
1920	55 seats	
1946	58 seats	This increase was caused by the addition of 3 members to represent the three branches of the Armed Forces, elected by Manitobans in the Armed Forces.
1949	57 seats	The 3 Armed Forces seats in the Assembly are eliminated, while the number of constituencies within Manitoba is increased to 57.

==== Before World War I ====
Seats won by party, 1879–1914
Government	Conservative			Liberal			Conservative				
Party	1879	1883	1886	1888	1892	1896	1899	1903	1907	1910	1914
Liberal-Conservative	7				2		3				
Conservative	6	20	20	4	9	5	18	32	28	28	28
Liberal	2	10	15	33	26	32	17	8	13	13	20
National Party	1										
Patrons of Industry						2					
Independent Conservative	2						2				
Independent Liberal	1				2						
Independent	5			1	1	1					1
Total	24	30	35	38	40	40	40	40	41	41	49

==== Farmers, Labour, CCF and Duff Roblin (1915–69) ====
Seats won by party, 1915–66
Government	Liberal		UFM	Progressive	L-P		Coalition			L-P	Progressive Conservative			
Party	1915	1920	1922	1927	1932	1936	1941	1945	1949	1953	1958	1959	1962	1966
Liberal	40	21	8	7									13	14
Liberal-Progressive					38	23	27	25	31	32	19	11		
Independent Liberal-Progressive										3				
Conservative	5	8	7	15	10	16	12							
Anti-Coalition Conservative							3							
Progressive Conservative								13	9	12	26	36	36	31
Farmer		12												
United Farmers of Manitoba			28											
Progressive				29										
Labour		9												
Independent Labour			6	3	5									
ILP-CCF						7								
Co-operative Commonwealth Federation							3	9	7	5	11	10		
New Democratic													7	11
Social Democratic	1	1												
Socialist		1												
Social Credit						5	3	2		2			1	1
Communist						1								
Labour Progressive								1	1	1				
Independent	1	3	6	1	2	3	7	5	9	2	1			
Total	47	55	55	55	55	55	57	57	57	57	57	57	57	57

==== Recent history (1969–present) ====
Seats won by party, 1969–2019
Government	NDP		PC	NDP		PC			NDP				PC		NDP
Party	1969	1973	1977	1981	1986	1988	1990	1995	1999	2003	2007	2011	2016	2019	2023
New Democratic	28	31	23	34	30	12	20	23	32	35	36	37	14	18	34
Progressive Conservative	22	21	33	23	26	25	30	31	24	20	19	19	40	36	22
Liberal	5	5	1		1	20	7	3	1	2	2	1	3	3	1
Social Credit	1														
Independent	1														
Total	57	57	57	57	57	57	57	57	57	57	57	57	57	57	57

% share of popular vote by party
Party	1969	1973	1977	1981	1986	1988	1990	1995	1999	2003	2007	2011	2016	2019	2023
New Democratic	38.27	42.31	38.62	47.38	41.50	23.62	28.80	32.81	44.51	49.47	48.00	46.16	25.74	31.38	45.63
Progressive Conservative	35.56	36.73	48.75	43.82	40.56	38.37	41.99	42.87	40.84	36.19	37.89	43.71	53.20	47.07	41.86
Liberal	23.99	19.04	12.29	6.70	13.92	35.52	28.15	23.72	13.40	13.19	12.39	7.52	14.24	14.48	10.63
Social Credit	1.36	0.37	0.27	–	–	–	–	–	–	–	–	–	–	–	–
Progressive	–	–	–	1.81	0.51	0.18	0.24	–	–	–	–	–	–	–	–
Confederation of Regions	–	–	–	–	2.44	1.32	0.32	–	–	–	–	–	–	–	–
Western Canada Concept	–	–	–	–	0.14	–	–	–	–	–	–	–	–	–	–
Western Independence	–	–	–	–	–	0.45	0.28	–	–	–	–	–	–	–	–
Green	–	–	–	–	–	–	–	–	0.20	0.96	1.34	2.52	5.17	6.43	0.74
Manitoba Party/Manitoba First	–	–	–	–	–	–	–	–	–	–	–	–	1.11	0.14	–
Keystone	–	–	–	–	–	–	–	–	–	–	–	–	–	–	0.77
Independent	0.60	1.49	–	0.24	0.85	0.39	0.09	0.47	0.25	0.04	0.30	0.05	0.46	0.18	0.28
Other	0.22	0.06	0.07	0.05	0.08	0.14	0.13	0.13	0.80	0.14	0.09	0.04	0.07	–	0.09

== Administrative divisions and municipal elections ==
Winnipeg city elections began to use single transferable voting (STV) in 1920, electing six councillors in three wards but only three at a time due to staggered terms. This system was used until 1970, when single-member wards were introduced.

Meanwhile Winnipeg's municipal structure was changed to the Metro system.

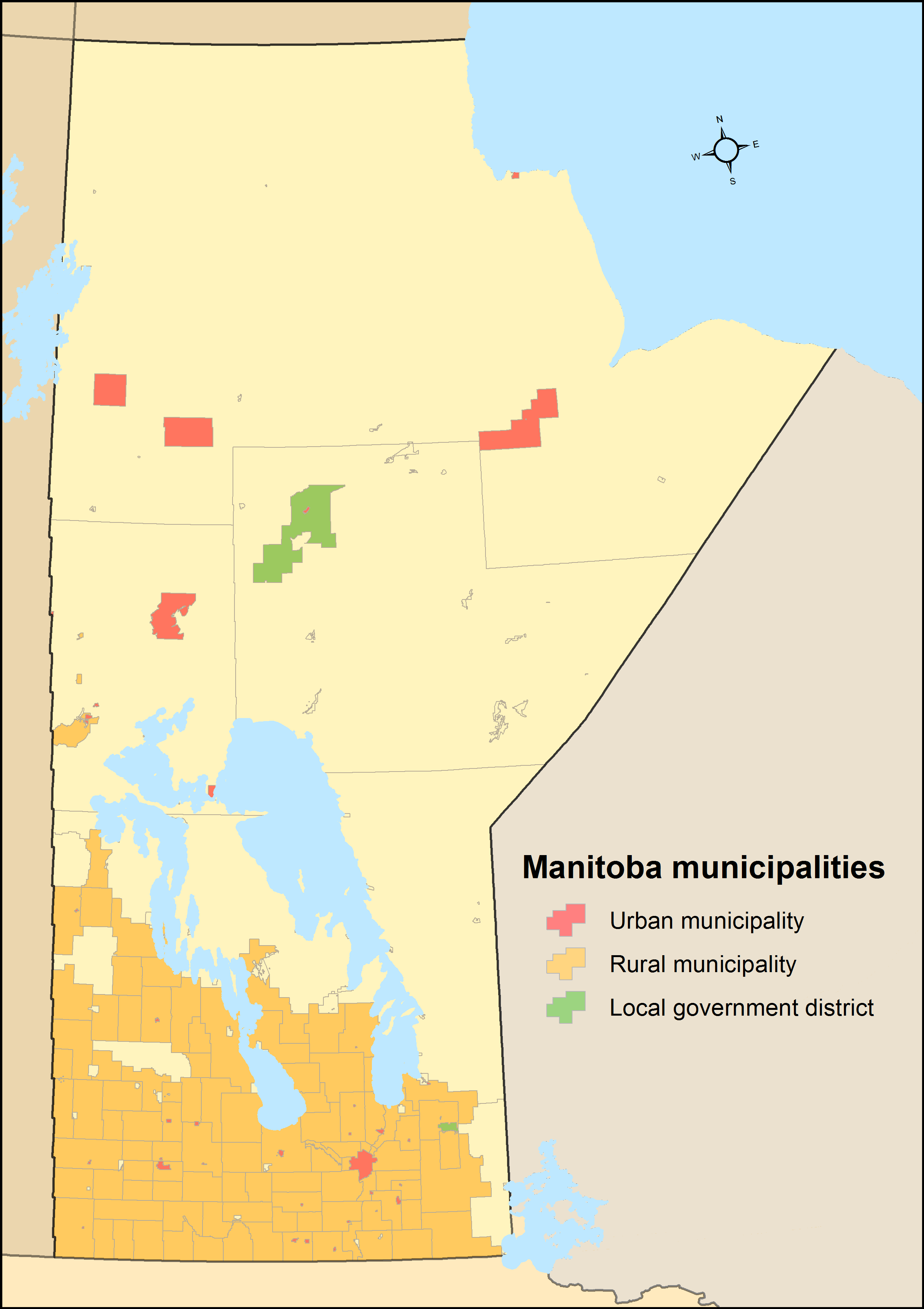
The urban and rural municipalities of Manitoba.

Below the provincial level of government, Manitoba is divided into municipalities of two types: urban and rural. A municipality in Manitoba is "a municipality that is continued or formed under" the Municipal Act, which was enacted in 1996. Municipalities that can be formed under this legislation include urban municipalities (cities, towns and villages) and rural municipalities. The Local Government Districts Act, enacted in 1987, allows the formation of local government districts as another municipality type. Of Manitoba's 137 municipalities, 37 of them are urban municipalities (10 cities, 25 towns and 2 villages), 98 are rural municipalities and 2 are local government districts. The Municipal Act and the Local Government Districts Act stipulate governance of these municipalities. Additional charters or acts are in place specifically for the cities of Brandon, Flin Flon, Portage la Prairie, Thompson and Winnipeg, the towns of Morris and Winnipeg Beach, and the rural municipalities of Kelsey, St. Andrews and Victoria Beach.

== See also ==
- List of Manitoba general elections
- Monarchy in Manitoba
- List of Manitoba government departments and agencies
- Elections Manitoba
- Politics of Canada
  - Political culture of Canada
  - Council of the Federation
