= Gildas Molgat =

Canadian politician

The Honourable Gildas Molgat CD
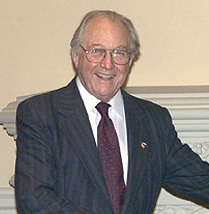
- Molgat in 2000

Speaker of the Senate of Canada
- In office November 22, 1994 – January 25, 2001
- Nominated by: Jean Chrétien
- Appointed by: Ramon Hnatyshyn
- Preceded by: Roméo LeBlanc
- Succeeded by: Daniel Hays

Canadian Senator from Manitoba
- In office October 7, 1970 – February 28, 2001
- Nominated by: Pierre Trudeau
- Appointed by: Roland Michener

Leader of the Opposition in Manitoba
- In office 1961–1969
- Preceded by: Douglas Lloyd Campbell
- Succeeded by: Walter Weir

Member of the Legislative Assembly of Manitoba for Ste. Rose
- In office July 6, 1953 – October 7, 1970
- Preceded by: Maurice Dane MacCarthy
- Succeeded by: Aime Adam

Leader of the Manitoba Liberal Party
- In office April 20, 1961 – May 10, 1969
- Preceded by: Douglas Campbell
- Succeeded by: Robert Bend

President of the Liberal Party of Canada
- In office 1973–1976
- Preceded by: Richard Stanbury
- Succeeded by: Alasdair Graham

Personal details
- Born: January 25, 1927 Sainte-Rose-du-Lac, Manitoba, Canada
- Died: February 28, 2001 (aged 74)
- Party: Liberal (federal); Liberal (provincial)

Gildas Laurent Molgat, CD (January 25, 1927 – February 28, 2001) was a Canadian politician. He served as leader of the Manitoba Liberal Party from 1961 to 1969, and was subsequently appointed to the Senate of Canada, where he served as Speaker from 1994 until 2001. He died shortly thereafter.

== Early life and education ==
The son of Louis F. Molgat and Adele Abraham, Molgat was born in Ste. Rose du Lac, Manitoba. He was educated at Ste. Rose School and the University of Manitoba. He worked as a manager for Bethel-Rennie Ltd. United Stores and Advance Credit Corporation, and served as an army captain in the Royal Winnipeg Rifles. He was married to Allison Malcolm.

== Political career ==
Molgat was first elected to the Manitoba legislature in 1953, in the francophone riding of Ste. Rose. He was a Liberal-Progressive, and a supporter of Premier Douglas Lloyd Campbell.

The Liberal-Progressives lost the election of 1958, though Molgat was easily re-elected over his Progressive Conservative opponent. This was partly the result of historical francophone voting patterns in the province—most Franco-Manitobans supported the Progressive Party of John Bracken in the 1920s, and continued to support the party after it merged with the Liberals in 1932. Although Dufferin Roblin's Tories made several gains in 1958, the province's francophone ridings continued to elect Liberal-Progressive MLAs.

Molgat was re-elected in 1959, again by a significant margin. When Campbell resigned as Liberal leader in 1961 (the "Progressive" name having been dropped), Molgat was selected to replace him. A protégé of Campbell, he was aligned with the more traditionalist wing of the party. His primary opponent for the party's leadership was Stan Roberts, who represented its modernizing wing. He was the first francophone party leader in Manitoba since 1919, and the first ever in the province's Liberal Party.

As party leader, Molgat prevented the Liberals from falling behind the New Democratic Party for third-party status, but he was never able to pose a serious threat to Roblin's government. The Progressive Conservatives had greater urban support, and were generally regarded as the more "modernizing" party. The Liberals won 13 seats in 1962, and 14 in 1966 (out of 57). Molgat never faced any serious competition in his own riding.

Roblin resigned as Progressive Conservative leader in 1967 and was replaced by the more conservative Walter Weir. After the election of Pierre Trudeau as Prime Minister of Canada in 1968, Weir's government took a number of steps to prevent the establishment of official bilingualism in the province. These measures seemed to be supported by many in Manitoba's anglophone community, and the provincial Liberals were shut out in four crucial by-elections in early 1969. Molgat resigned as party leader soon thereafter, and was replaced by Robert Bend.

This proved to be a poor strategic decision for the Liberals. Bend represented the rural, traditional wing of the party, and had been out of politics for a decade. His campaign fared poorly, and the party was reduced to five members in the general election of 1969 (three of whom were francophone). Molgat was again elected in Ste. Rose without serious difficulty.

The election itself resulted in a temporary stalemate; Edward Schreyer's New Democrats had won 28 seats out of 57, one shy of a majority. There were negotiations between the Liberal and Conservative parties to form a coalition; one scenario would have seen Molgat serving as premier. The impasse ended when a francophone Liberal MLA, Laurent Desjardins, announced that he would support the NDP.

Molgat resigned his seat on October 7, 1970, having been appointed on the recommendation of Pierre Trudeau to the Canadian Senate. He soon became one the Senate's leading figures in the field of constitutional reform, co-chairing a Special Joint Committee on the Constitution of Canada in 1971, and another on Senate Reform in 1983. He also served as president of the Liberal Party of Canada from 1973 until 1976. Later in the 1980s, he would serve as chair of the Senate Committee of the Whole on the Meech Lake Constitutional Accord.

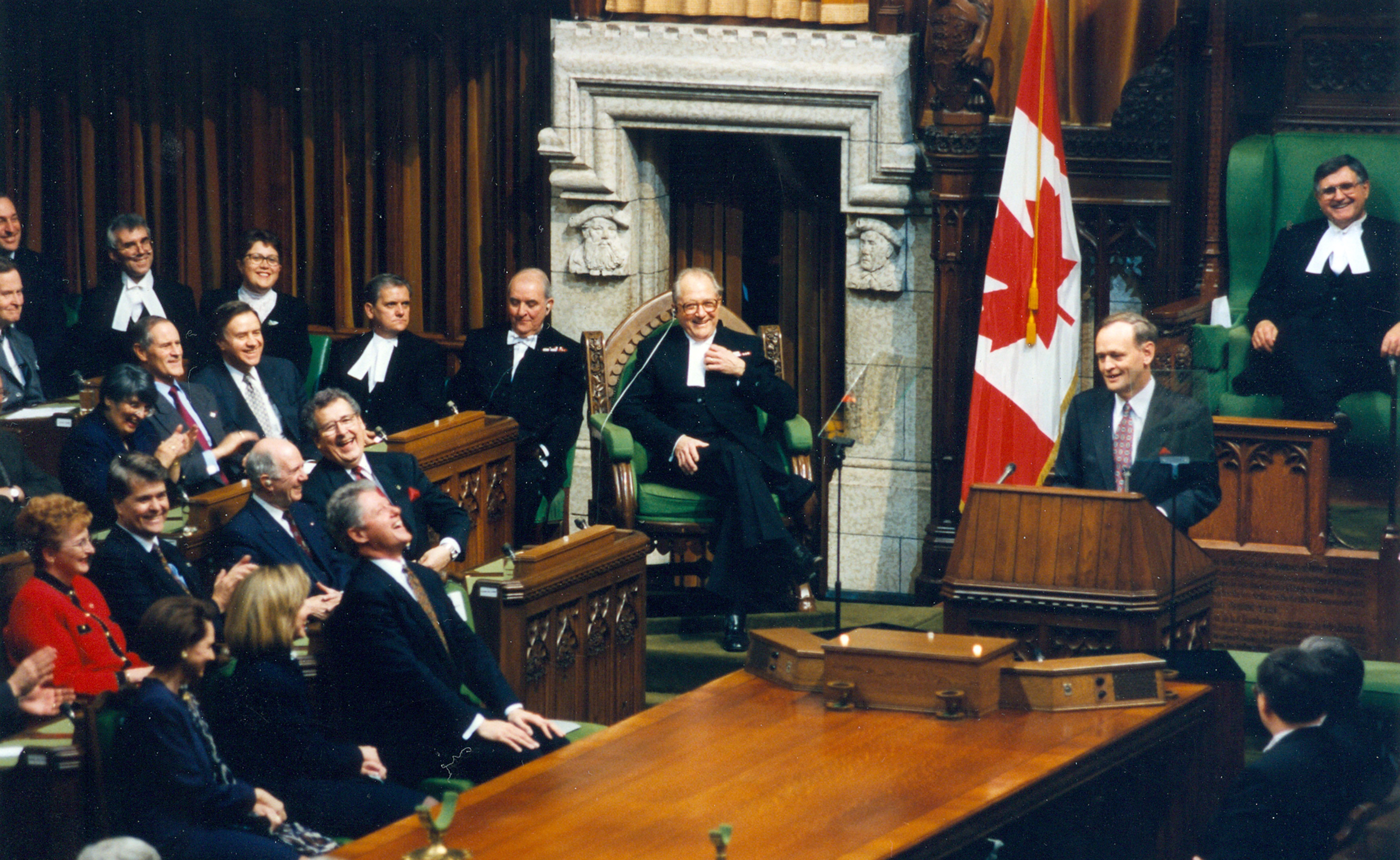
Molgat (center seated), Canadian Prime Minister Jean Chrétien speaking to Parliament in Ottawa, during the visit of US President Bill Clinton, and First Lady Hillary Clinton in 1995.

Molgat was elected deputy speaker in 1983 and was re-elected to the position in 1988. From September 30, 1991, to November 11, 1993, he served as deputy opposition leader in the Senate. When the federal Liberals under Jean Chrétien formed government, Molgat became deputy government leader. One year later, when Roméo LeBlanc was appointed Governor General of Canada, Molgat replaced him as Speaker of the Senate of Canada.

Molgat also served as president of the Liberal Party of Canada.

== Death ==
He died in hospital on February 28, 2001, following a stroke.

Parliament of Canada
Preceded by Roméo LeBlanc	Speaker of the Senate of Canada; 1994–2001	Succeeded by Dan Hays
Party political offices
Preceded by Richard Stanbury	President of the Liberal Party of Canada; 1973–1976	Succeeded by Alasdair Graham
