= Ministry of Municipal Affairs (Manitoba) =

Ministry in Manitoba, Canada

Manitoba Municipal and Northern Relations
Agency overview
- Preceding agencies: Dept. of Local Government; Minister of Municipal Relations
- Headquarters: 800 Portage Avenue, Winnipeg, MB
- Minister responsible: Glen Simard, Minister of Municipal and Northern Relations
- Website: gov.mb.ca/mr/

Manitoba Municipal and Northern Relations (formerly Department of Municipal Affairs until 1978) is a department of the Government of Manitoba that deals with local administrations and bodies, including municipalities, planning districts, and non-governmental organizations. This includes the provision of training, ongoing consultation, technical analysis, and funding related to land management, community renewal, infrastructure, and the building of capacity of local governments to provide services.

The department is organized into two functional areas: Community Planning and Development; and Infrastructure and Municipal Services. There are also two areas of special focus:

- The Manitoba Water Services Board is a Crown Corporation of the department that helps deliver technical advice/information in order to develop and upgrade sewer and water infrastructure
- The Office of the Fire Commissioner is a special operating agency of the department, with a mandate to "safeguard both persons and property from fire and life safety hazards through education, investigations, inspections, emergency response and code application."

== History ==
From 1886 to 1953, responsibility for overseeing municipal affairs throughout the province of Manitoba belong to the Department of the Municipal Commissioner, which was established by The Manitoba Municipal Act. The Municipal Commissioner replaced the existing system of municipal councils, county councils, and judicial boards which was established in the 1870s. This system was maintained by municipal taxation, and was soon found to be too costly and difficult to manage. County councils were abolished in 1884, followed by the judicial boards two years later; the Department of Municipal Commissioner was created thereafter.

In 1953, the office of Municipal Commissioner was restructured and the provincial government assumed new responsibilities for municipal supervision. The result was the creation of the Department of Municipal Affairs by The Department of Municipal Affairs Act on 20 April 1953.

From around 1966 to 1969, the department was known as the Department of Urban Development and Municipal Affairs. However, in 1971, the enactment of the new City of Winnipeg Act saw the creation a new Department of Urban Affairs, which was responsible for advising and assisting the new City of Winnipeg. The Department of Municipal Affairs continued to advise and assist rural municipalities in Manitoba.

In 1978, the Municipal Affairs and Urban Affairs departments briefly merged to create the Department of Municipal and Urban Affairs. In 1979, a Minister of Urban Affairs was appointed but the departments did not formally separate again until 1981.

In 1989, under the government of Gary Filmon, Municipal Affairs was combined with parts of the Department of Industry, Trade and Tourism, the Department of Agriculture, and the Department of Natural Resources to form the Department of Rural Development. It provided advisory and program services to municipalities, local economic and environmental organizations, and citizens in rural Manitoba. In 1992, the Department was organized into two divisions—Local Government Services and Rural Economic Development—which oversaw branches and programs including the Food Development Centre, Rural Development Institute, Conservation Districts Program, and Assessment Branch.

In 1999, Rural Development merged with the Department of Urban Affairs to create the Department of Intergovernmental Affairs. All of the programs of the former Department of Rural Development were absorbed into the new department, except for the Food Development Centre, which became part of the Department of Agriculture and Food.

In 2003, the Department's Rural and Northern Community Economic Development division was transferred to the newly-created Manitoba Agriculture, Food and Rural Initiatives (MAFRI) department. At the same time, the Trade and Federal-Provincial and International Relations division was created in the department through programming transfers from five departments; as result, the department was renamed the Department of Intergovernmental Affairs and Trade. In September 2006, the Trade and Federal-Provincial and International Relations division, the Canada-Manitoba Infrastructure Agreement and the Economic Partnership Agreement were transferred out of the department and it was again renamed the Department of Intergovernmental Affairs.

In November 2009, the various divisions were transferred out of the Department of Intergovernmental Affairs and it was subsequently renamed the Department of Local Government. In October 2013, a government reorganization added the Energy Division, along with responsibilities for Manitoba Hydro, to the department which was then renamed the Department of Municipal Government. A new position of Minister Responsible for Relations with the City of Winnipeg was created under this new department.

On 3 May 2016, the responsibilities of the former departments of Municipal Government and Aboriginal and Northern Affairs were combined into a single unit, the department of Indigenous and Municipal Relations, created by the newly-elected government led by Brian Pallister. The following year, the portfolios were again split, establishing the departments of Municipal Relations and Indigenous and Northern Relations.

== List of Municipal Relations ministers ==
The longest-serving Minister of Municipal Affairs in Manitoba was Howard Pawley, who served from 1969 to 1976 and played a significant role in the amalgamation of Winnipeg. Pawley later served as Premier of Manitoba from 1981 to 1988.

Name	Party	Took office	Left office	Notes
Minister of Municipal Affairs
Edmond Prefontaine	Lib-Prog	April 20, 1953	June 30, 1958	
John Thompson	PC	June 30, 1958	December 21, 1969	
Maurice Ridley	PC	December 21, 1959	September 30, 1960	
Sterling Lyon	PC	December 30, 1960	October 25, 1961	
Walter C. Weir	PC	October 25, 1961	February 27, 1963	
Robert Smellie	PC	February 27, 1963	July 22, 1966	
Thelma Forbes	PC	July 22, 1966	September 24, 1968	as the Minister of Urban Development and Municipal Affairs
Obie Baizley	PC	September 24, 1968	July 15, 1969	concurrently the Commissioner of Northern Affairs
Howard Pawley	NDP	July 15, 1969	September 22, 1976	
Bill Uruski	NDP	September 22, 1976	October 24, 1977	
Gerald Mercier	PC	October 24, 1977	November 15, 1979	
Douglas Gourlay	PC	November 15, 1979	November 30, 1981	
Aime Adam	NDP	November 30, 1981	November 4, 1983	
Andy Anstett	NDP	November 4, 1983	April 17, 1986	
John Bucklaschuk	NDP	April 17, 1986	September 21, 1987	
Bill Uruski	NDP	September 21, 1987	May 9, 1988	
Glen Cummings	PC	May 9, 1988	April 21, 1989	
Minister of Rural Development
Jack Penner	PC	April 21, 1989	February 5, 1991	
Jim Downey	PC	February 5, 1991	January 14, 1992	concurrently the Deputy Premier, Minister of Northern Affairs, and the Minister responsible for Communities Economic Development Fund
Leonard Derkach	PC	January 14, 1992	October 5, 1999	
Minister of Intergovernmental Affairs
Jean Friesen	NDP	October 5, 1999	June 25, 2003	
Rosann Wowchuk	NDP	June 25, 2003	November 4, 2003	as Minister responsible for Intergovernmental Affairs
MaryAnn Mihychuk	NDP	November 4, 2003	May 18, 2004	as Minister of Intergovernmental Affairs and Trade
Scott Smith	NDP	October 12, 2004	September 21, 2006	as Minister of Intergovernmental Affairs and Trade
Steve Ashton	NDP	September 21, 2006	September 14, 2009	
Minister of Municipal Government
Ron Lemieux	NDP	November 3, 2009	October 18, 2013	as the Minister of Local Government (Portfolio name change)
Stan Struthers	NDP	October 18, 2013	November 3, 2014	(Kevin Chief was the "Minister responsible for the City of Winnipeg within the Department of Municipal Government")
Drew Caldwell	NDP	November 3, 2014	May 3, 2016	
Minister of Indigenous and Municipal Relations
Eileen Clarke	PC	May 3, 2016	August 17, 2017	After August 17, Clarke's portfolio was renamed Minister of Indigenous and Northern Relations.
Minister of Municipal Relations
Jeff Wharton	PC	August 17, 2017	October 23, 2019	
Rochelle Squires	PC	October 23, 2019	January 5, 2021	
Derek Johnson	PC	January 5, 2021	January 18, 2022	
Eileen Clarke	PC	January 18, 2022	January 30, 2023	
Andrew Smith	PC	January 30, 2023	October 18, 2023	
Minister of Municipal and Northern Relations
Ian Bushie	NDP	October 18, 2023	November 13, 2024	Also the Minister of Indigenous Economic Development
Glen Simard	NDP	November 13, 2024	incumbent	

Ministers
Name	Party	Title	Took office	Left office
Darren Praznik	PC	Minister responsible for French Language Services	February 5, 1991	May 9, 1995
Darren Praznik	PC	Minister responsible for French Language Services	January 6, 1997	October 5, 1999
Gary Filmon	PC	Minister of French Language Services	February 5, 1991	October 5, 1999
Greg Selinger	NDP	Minister responsible for Francophone Affairs	October 5, 1999	September 14, 2009
Greg Selinger	NDP	Minister responsible for French Language Services	November 3, 2009	May 3, 2016
Rochelle Squires	PC	Minister responsible for Francophone Affairs	May 3, 2016	October 18, 2023
Glen Simard	NDP	Minister responsible for Francophone Affairs	October 18, 2023	incumbent

== Statutory responsibilities ==
- The Buildings and Mobile Homes Act
- City of Winnipeg Charter (S.M. 2002, c. 39)
- The Capital Region Partnership Act
- The Community Renewal Act
- The Convention Centre Corporation Act (S.M. 1988-89, c. 39)
- The Electricians' Licence Act
- The Elevator Act
- The Fires Prevention and Emergency Response Act
- The Gas and Oil Burner Act
- The Local Government Districts Act
- The Municipal Act
- The Municipal Assessment Act
- The Municipal Affairs Administration Act
- The Municipal Amalgamations Act
- The Municipal Board Act
- The Municipal Councils and School Boards Elections Act
- An Act respecting Debts Owing by Municipalities to School Districts
- The Official Time Act
- The Planning Act [except Part 10]
- The Power Engineers Act
- The Regional Waste Management Authorities Act
- The Soldiers' Taxation Relief Act
- The Steam and Pressure Plants Act
- The Technical Safety Act
- The Unconditional Grants Act
- The Manitoba Water Services Board Act
- The Bilingual Service Centres Act, C.C.S.M. c. B37
- The Francophone Community Enhancement and Support Act, C.C.S.M. c. F157
- The Department of Agriculture, Food and Rural Development Act [Section 9 "insofar as it relates to Rural Opportunities 4 Growth, Infrastructure Grants or Rural Economic Development Initiatives"]
- The Amusements Act [Part II]
- The Labour Administration Act ["insofar as it relates to the administration of The Fires Prevention and Emergency Response Act"]
- The Municipal Taxation and Funding Act [Part 2]

== See also ==
- Ministry of Municipal Affairs (Alberta)
- Department of Municipal Affairs (New Brunswick)
- Ministry of Municipal Affairs and Housing (Ontario)
- Ministry of Municipal Affairs and Housing (Quebec)
