= Glen Cummings (politician) =

Canadian politician (born 1944)

Member of the Legislative Assembly of Manitoba for Ste. Rose
- In office March 18, 1986 – May 22, 2007
- Preceded by: Aimé Adam
- Succeeded by: Stu Briese

Personal details
- Born: April 12, 1944 (age 82) Neepawa, Manitoba, Canada
- Party: Progressive Conservative
- Profession: farmer

James Glen Cummings (born April 12, 1944) is a farmer and former politician in Manitoba, Canada. He was a member of the Legislative Assembly of Manitoba from 1986 to 2007, and was as a cabinet minister in the government of Gary Filmon.

The son of James William Cummings and Lillian Grace McDonald, he was born in Neepawa, Manitoba, and was educated at Neepawa Area College. Before entering provincial politics, he was a school board chair and trustee in the Beautiful Plains School Division, and worked as a farmer. He also sat on the executive of the Beautiful Plains Agricultural Society for twelve years. In 1969, he married Heather Lynne Harvey.

In the provincial election of 1986, Cummings was elected as a Progressive Conservative in the rural riding of Ste. Rose, defeating New Democrat Gary Anderson by 3735 votes to 3020. The NDP won the election, and Cummings became a member of the parliamentary opposition.

The Progressive Conservatives won the provincial election of 1988, and Cummings was re-elected in Ste. Rose by an increased margin (with the Liberals overtaking the NDP for second place). When Gary Filmon was sworn in as Manitoba's Premier on May 9, 1988, Cummings became Deputy Premier and Minister of Municipal Affairs with responsibility for administration of the Manitoba Public Insurance Corporation Act and the Jobs Fund Act. On April 21, 1989, he was shifted out of Municipal Affairs and was made Minister of the Environment, while retaining his other positions.

Cummings was easily re-elected in the provincial election of 1990, in which the Progressive Conservatives won a majority of seats. He was removed as Deputy Premier on February 5, 1991, while retaining his other positions. In the provincial election of 1995, he defeated NDP candidate John Morrisseau by 3762 votes to 2341.

Following a cabinet shuffle on January 6, 1997, Cummings was made Minister of Natural Resources, with responsibility for the Natural Resources Development Act. He retained this position until 1999, when Filmon's Tories were defeated by the NDP under Gary Doer in a provincial election.

Cummings retained his own seat in the 1999 election, defeating NDP candidate Louise Wilson by 3871 votes to 3293. He returned to the opposition benches, and served as his party's family services critic. In 2002, he called for a financial bailout of the Manitoba Métis fishing industry.

In the 2003 election, he defeated NDP candidate John Harapiak by over 1400 votes, despite the poor showing of the Progressive Conservative party elsewhere in the province. In the buildup to this election, Cummings was a leading proponent of the PC party's plan to remove education taxes from residences and farmland. He remains a leading voice in the party's parliamentary caucus.

In 2004, Cummings endorsed Steven Fletcher for election to the federal House of Commons. He did not run for re-election in 2007.
