= Joseph Hamelin =

Canadian politician (1873–1947)

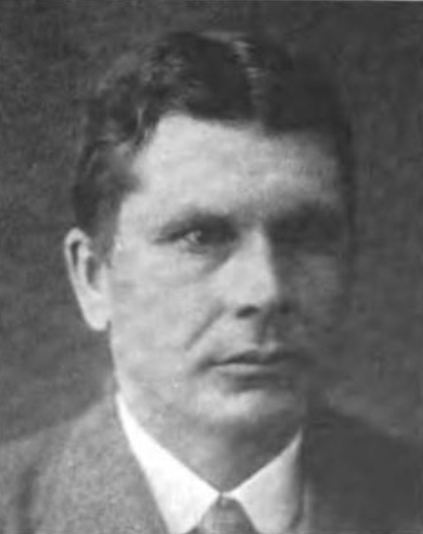

Member of the Legislative Assembly of Manitoba
- In office 1914–1927
- Constituency: Ste. Rose

Personal details
- Born: February 22, 1873 St. Vital, Manitoba
- Died: August 29, 1947 (aged 74) Niagara Falls, Ontario
- Party: Conservative
- Spouse: Parmélie Gamache (m. 1900)
- Children: 10
- Occupation: Merchant, politician

Joseph Hamelin (February 22, 1873 – August 29, 1947) was a politician in Manitoba, Canada. He served in the Legislative Assembly of Manitoba from 1914 to 1927.

Hamelin's paternal grandfather, Salomon Hamelin, served in the Legislative Council of Manitoba from 1871 to 1876, while his maternal grandfather was legislator Pascal Breland.

== Biography ==
Hamelin was born in St. Vital, Manitoba (now part of Winnipeg), the son of Firmin Hamelin and Clemence Breland, and was educated in St. Boniface and at the Juniorate of the Sacred Heart in Ottawa, Ontario. He then returned to Manitoba and worked as a merchant, becoming manager of the Joseph Hamelin Co. general store in Ste. Rose du Lac in 1912. He served as reeve of Ste. Rose from 1900 to 1916.

Hamelin was first elected to the Manitoba legislature in the 1914 provincial election. Running for the Conservative Party in Ste. Rose, he defeated Liberal candidate J.A. Campbell by sixty votes. After the election, he served as a backbench supporter of Rodmond Roblin's government.

Hamelin's time on the government benches was brief. The Roblin government was forced to resign amid scandal in early 1915, and was resoundingly defeated in the 1915 provincial election. Hamelin was one of only five Conservatives to win re-election, defeating Liberal candidate Z.H. Rheaume by twenty-nine votes. Hamelin was the last member to speak against the bill granting women the vote in Manitoba in 1916. In the end, he voted in support of the bill, making its passage unanimous. He was again returned in the 1920 election, in which the Conservatives won eight seats out of fifty-five.

In the 1922 election, Hamelin won re-election over United Farmers of Manitoba candidate Thomas McDonald by ninety votes. He identified himself as an independent candidate during this campaign, although most political observers considered him to be a Conservative in all but name. He appears to have rejoined the Conservative caucus during the parliament that followed. In the 1927 election, he lost the Ste. Rose constituency to Progressive candidate Maurice Dane MacCarthy by 224 votes.

Hamelin attempted to return to the legislature in the 1936 election, but lost to Liberal-Progressive candidate Sauveur Marcoux by 830 votes in the La Verendrye constituency.

In 1900 at Laurier, Manitoba, he married Parmélie Gamache. They had 10 children. Hamelin died in Niagara Falls, Ontario on August 29, 1947.
