= Government of Manitoba =

Canadian provincial government

- Provincial government

Overview
- Established: July 15, 1870
- Country: Canada
- Polity: Province
- Leader: Premier; Wab Kinew
- Appointed by: Lieutenant Governor; Anita Neville
- Main organ: Executive Council
- Responsible to: Legislative Assembly
- Headquarters: Winnipeg
- Website: www.gov.mb.ca

The powers and structure of the provincial Government of Manitoba (French: Gouvernement du Manitoba) are set out in the Constitution Act, 1867.

In modern Canadian use, the term "government" refers broadly to the cabinet of the day (formally the Executive Council), elected from the Legislative Assembly and the non-political staff within each provincial department or agency – that is, the civil service.

The Province of Manitoba has a unicameral legislature, the Manitoba Legislature, consisting of the Lieutenant Governor and the Legislative Assembly, which operates in framework of a Westminster-style parliamentary constitutional monarchy. The political party that wins the largest number of seats in the legislature normally forms the government, and the party's leader becomes premier of the province, i.e., the head of the government.

== Role of the Crown ==
The functions of the Sovereign, Charles III, King of Canada, known in Manitoba as the King in Right of Manitoba, are exercised by the Lieutenant Governor of Manitoba. The Lieutenant Governor is appointed by the Governor General of Canada on the recommendation of the Prime Minister of Canada, in consultation with the Premier of Manitoba.

== Departments ==
- Advanced Education and Training
- Agriculture
- Business, Mining, Trade and Job Creation
- Economic Development, Investment, Trade and Natural Resources
- Education and Early Childhood Learning
- Environment and Climate Change
- Families
  - Accessibility
  - Women and Gender Equity
- Finance
- Health, Seniors and Long Term Care
- Housing, Addictions and Homelessness
- Indigenous Reconciliation and Northern Relations
- Innovation and New Technology
- Intergovernmental Affairs
- Justice
- Labour and Immigration
- Municipal and Northern Relations
  - Francophone Affairs
- Natural Resources and Indigenous Futures
- Public Service Commission
- Public Service Delivery
- Sport, Culture, Heritage and Tourism
- Transportation and Infrastructure

== See also ==
- Politics of Manitoba
- Lieutenant Governor of Manitoba
- Premier of Manitoba
- Manitoba Legislature
- Legislative Assembly of Manitoba
- Executive Council of Manitoba
- 2023 Manitoba general election
