= Agassiz (electoral district) =

Provincial electoral district in Manitoba, Canada

Coordinates: 50.434°N 99.210°W

Manitoba electoral district

Provincial electoral district
- Legislature: Legislative Assembly of Manitoba
MLA
Jodie Byram
Progressive Conservative
- District created: 2008
- First contested: 2011
- Last contested: 2023

Demographics
- Population (2016): 23,205
- Electors (2019): 13,514
- Area (km²): 7,840
- Pop. density (per km²): 3

Agassiz is a provincial electoral district of Manitoba, Canada. It was created by redistribution in 2008, out of parts of Ste. Rose and Turtle Mountain.

Communities in the riding include Gladstone, Neepawa, McCreary, Carberry, MacGregor and Westbourne. The riding's population in 2006 was 20,805.

== Members of the Legislative Assembly ==
Assembly	Years	Member	Party
Riding created from Ste. Rose and Turtle Mountain
40th	2011–2016	Stu Briese	Progressive Conservative
41st	2016–2023	Eileen Clarke	Progressive Conservative
42nd	2016–2023	Eileen Clarke	Progressive Conservative
43rd	2023–Present	Jodie Byram	Progressive Conservative

== Election results ==
=== 2023 ===
2023 Manitoba general election
Party	Candidate	Votes	%	±%	Expenditures
Progressive Conservative	Jodie Byram	4,519	63.85	-11.67	$15,784.10
New Democratic	Danica Wiggins	1,553	21.94	+9.17	$168.00
Keystone	Mark Wilson	694	9.81	–	$2,420.84
Liberal	Richard Davies	311	4.39	-1.74	$0.00
Total valid votes/expense limit		7,077	99.24	–	$52,088.00
Total rejected and declined ballots		54	0.76	–	
Turnout		7,131	53.35	-2.70	
Eligible voters		13,366			
Progressive Conservative hold		Swing		-10.42	
Source(s) Source: Elections Manitoba

=== 2019 ===
2019 Manitoba general election
Party	Candidate	Votes	%	±%	Expenditures
Progressive Conservative	Eileen Clarke	5,700	75.53	+0.2	$7,945.59
New Democratic	Kelly Legaspi	964	12.77	+6.4	$631.55
Liberal	Hector Swanson	463	6.13	+5.2	$4,095.23
Green	Liz Clayton	420	5.57	+0.3	$1,276.17
Total valid votes		7,547	99.63	–	
Rejected		28	0.37		
Turnout		7,575	56.05		
Eligible voters		13,514			
Progressive Conservative hold		Swing		-3.1	
Source(s) Source: Manitoba. Chief Electoral Officer (2019). Statement of Votes for the 42nd Provincial General Election, September 10, 2019 (PDF) (Report). Winnipeg: Elections Manitoba.

=== 2016 ===
2016 provincial election redistributed results
Party	%
Progressive Conservative	75.3
New Democratic	6.4
Green	5.3
Liberal	0.9
Others	12.1

2016 Manitoba general election
Party	Candidate	Votes	%	±%	Expenditures
Progressive Conservative	Eileen Clarke	5,228	74.72	3.67	$11,942.69
Independent	Damian Dempsey	910	13.01	–	$6,465.29
New Democratic	Courtney Lucas	450	6.43	-10.77	$146.90
Green	Robert F. Smith	409	5.85	0.74	$781.10
Total valid votes		6,997	–	–	
Rejected		49	–		
Eligible voters / turnout		12,332	57.14	11.13	
Progressive Conservative hold		Swing		–4.51	
Source(s) Source: Manitoba. Chief Electoral Officer (2016). Statement of Votes for the 41st Provincial General Election, April 19, 2016 (PDF) (Report). Winnipeg: Elections Manitoba. "Election Returns: 41st General Election". Elections Manitoba. 2016.

=== 2011 ===
2011 Manitoba general election
Party	Candidate	Votes	%	Expenditures
Progressive Conservative	Stu Briese	4,396	71.05	$14,131.88
New Democratic	Amity Sagness	1,064	17.20	$525.28
Liberal	Gary Sallows	411	6.64	$2,989.12
Green	Kate Storey	316	5.11	$78.00
Total valid votes		6,187	–	
Rejected		28	–	
Eligible voters / turnout		13,509	46.01	
Source(s) Source: Manitoba. Chief Electoral Officer (2011). Statement of Votes for the 40th Provincial General Election, October 4, 2011 (PDF) (Report). Winnipeg: Elections Manitoba. "Election Returns: 40th General Election". Elections Manitoba. 2011.

== See also ==
- List of Manitoba provincial electoral districts
- Canadian provincial electoral districts
