= Aimé Adam =

Canadian politician

Minister of Municipal Affairs
- In office November 30, 1981 – November 4, 1983
- Premier: Howard Pawley
- Preceded by: Doug Gourlay
- Succeeded by: Andy Anstett

Member of the Legislative Assembly of Manitoba for Ste. Rose
- In office April 5, 1971 – March 18, 1986
- Preceded by: Gildas Molgat
- Succeeded by: Glen Cummings

Personal details
- Born: Aimé Raleigh Adam; December 5, 1913 Radville, Saskatchewan, Canada
- Died: January 7, 2009 (aged 95) Dauphin, Manitoba, Canada
- Party: New Democratic Party of Manitoba
- Profession: Farmer, politician

Aimé Raleigh (Pete) Adam (December 5, 1913 – January 7, 2009) was a politician in Manitoba, Canada. He served as a New Democratic member of the Legislative Assembly of Manitoba from 1971 to 1986, and was a cabinet minister in the government of Howard Pawley.

Adam was born in Radville, Saskatchewan, the son of Lionel and Marcella Adam. His nickname "Pete" came from his mother's French name for him: "petit" (small). While he was still young, his family moved to Toutes Aides, Manitoba and later to Crane River. In 1937, he married Mary Didychuk. After they married, the couple moved to Winnipeg, where Adam worked for the Canadian National Railway. He later returned to Crane River to help his father. In 1949, Adam opened an International Harvester farm implement dealership with his brother at Ste. Rose du Lac. In 1961, he began farming and ranching near Ochre River. He was a charter member of the National Farmers Union and served as president of its Local 509.

He was first elected to the Manitoba legislature in a 1971 by-election in the rural riding of Ste. Rose, called after the sitting MLA, former Liberal leader Gildas Molgat, was appointed to the Senate of Canada. Although the NDP had never won the seat before, Adam scored a convincing victory over his Liberal and Progressive Conservative opponents, and provided Edward Schreyer's government with a functioning majority. He was easily re-elected in the election of 1973, although he was not appointed to Schreyer's cabinet.

Adam was again re-elected in the 1977 election, which was won by the Tories under Sterling Lyon. In early 1979, he supported Howard Pawley's bid to replace Schreyer as interim leader of the party.

The NDP under Pawley returned to government in the election of 1981, although Adam ironically faced the toughest re-election challenge of his career, defeating Progressive Conservative candidate Ivan Traill by fewer than 200 votes. It may be noted that there was no Liberal candidate in this race and that most traditionally Liberal voters in rural Manitoba had shifted to the Progressive Conservatives by this time.

Despite being almost seventy years old, Adam was appointed Minister of Municipal Affairs and Minister of Cooperative Development on November 30, 1981. He was relieved of the latter position on August 20, 1982, and of the former on November 4, 1983, when he was named Minister of Government Services in a cabinet shuffle. Adam left cabinet entirely on January 30, 1985, and did not seek re-election in 1986.

Adam was a prominent defender of Canada's Western Grain Transportation Act (sometimes called the "Crow Benefit"), a subsidy which covered transportation costs for farmers shipping wheat. On one occasion, he printed off a series of buttons with the slogan, "Save the Crow".

After he retired, Adam moved to Dauphin, Manitoba. He died there at the age of 95.

== Electoral record ==
1981 Manitoba general election: Ste. Rose
Party	Candidate	Votes	%	±%
New Democratic	Aimé Adam	4,031	50.09	3.96
Progressive Conservative	Ivan Traill	3,823	47.50	15.17
Progressive	Valerie Wilson	194	2.41	–
Total valid votes		8,048	–	–
Rejected		23	–	
Eligible voters / Turnout		11,036	73.13	4.15
Source(s) Source: Manitoba. Chief Electoral Officer (1999). Statement of Votes for the 37th Provincial General Election, September 21, 1999 (PDF) (Report). Winnipeg: Elections Manitoba.

1977 Manitoba general election: Ste. Rose
Party	Candidate	Votes	%	±%
New Democratic	Aimé Adam	2,611	46.13	1.54
Progressive Conservative	Arthur Erickson	1,830	32.33	6.60
Liberal	John Fleming	1,219	21.54	-8.14
Total valid votes		5,660	–	–
Rejected		9	–	
Eligible voters / Turnout		8,218	68.98	-5.85
Source(s) Source: Manitoba. Chief Electoral Officer (1999). Statement of Votes for the 37th Provincial General Election, September 21, 1999 (PDF) (Report). Winnipeg: Elections Manitoba.

1973 Manitoba general election: Ste. Rose
Party	Candidate	Votes	%	±%
New Democratic	Aimé Adam	2,627	44.59	3.00
Liberal	Dwight Hopfner	1,748	29.67	-1.96
Progressive Conservative	Alf O'Loughlin	1,516	25.73	-1.03
Total valid votes		5,891	–	–
Rejected		44	–	
Eligible voters / Turnout		7,931	74.83	–
Source(s) Source: Manitoba. Chief Electoral Officer (1999). Statement of Votes for the 37th Provincial General Election, September 21, 1999 (PDF) (Report). Winnipeg: Elections Manitoba.

Manitoba provincial by-election, April 5, 1971: Ste. Rose Resignation of Gildas Molgat
Party	Candidate	Votes	%	±%
New Democratic	Aimé Adam	2,785	41.60	24.89
Liberal	Fred Werbiski	2,118	31.64	-18.16
Progressive Conservative	John Boerchers	1,792	26.77	0.21
Total valid votes		6,695	–	–
Rejected		N/A	–	
Eligible voters / Turnout		N/A	–	–
Source(s) Source: Manitoba. Chief Electoral Officer (1999). Statement of Votes for the 37th Provincial General Election, September 21, 1999 (PDF) (Report). Winnipeg: Elections Manitoba.
