= Stu Briese =

Canadian politician (1946–2019)

Member of the Legislative Assembly of Manitoba for Agassiz Ste. Rose (2007-2011)
- In office May 22, 2007 – April 19, 2016
- Preceded by: Glen Cummings
- Succeeded by: Eileen Clarke

Personal details
- Born: May 6, 1946 Neepawa, Manitoba, Canada
- Died: March 12, 2019 (aged 72) North Cypress–Langford, Manitoba, Canada
- Party: Progressive Conservative

Stuart Gordon Briese (May 6, 1946 – March 12, 2019) was a politician in Manitoba, Canada. He was elected to the Legislative Assembly of Manitoba in the 2007 provincial election, for the electoral division of Ste. Rose. Briese was a member of the Progressive Conservative Party.

== Biography ==
Briese served twenty years on the council for the Rural Municipality of Langford. He also was a director of the Association of Manitoba Municipalities, serving as president and vice-president as well, and served three years on the board for the Federation of Canadian Municipalities. In 2013, he was awarded the Queen Elizabeth II Diamond Jubilee Medal for outstanding contribution to municipal government in Manitoba.

Briese was reelected in the 2011 provincial election for the newly created electoral division of Agassiz. In June 2014, he announced that he would not run for reelection in the upcoming general election. He died on March 12, 2019, at the age of 72.
