= Indigenous and Municipal Relations (Manitoba) =

The department of Indigenous and Municipal Relations was created on May 3, 2016 by the newly-elected government led by Brian Pallister. It combined the responsibilities of the former departments Aboriginal and Northern Affairs and Municipal Government into a single unit.

== Related Legislation ==
=== Indigenous Relations ===
Acts
The Northern Affairs Act
The Path to Reconciliation Act
The Planning Act, (Part 9)
The Communities Economic Development Fund Act

=== Municipal Relations ===
Acts
The Biofuels Act
The Capital Region Partnership Act
The City of Winnipeg Charter (S.M. 2002, c.39)
The Community Revitalization Tax Increment Financing Act
The Energy Act
The Energy Savings Act
The Gas Pipe Line Act
The Gas Allocation Act
The Greater Winnipeg Gas Distribution Act (S.M. 1988-89, c.40)
The Local Government Districts Act
The Municipal Act
The Municipal Assessment Act
The Municipal Affairs Administration Act
The Municipal Amalgamations Act
The Municipal Board Act
The Municipal Councils and School Boards Elections Act
An Act Respecting Debts Owing by Municipalities to School Districts
The Municipal Taxation and Funding Act [Part 2]
The Official Time Act
The Planning Act [except Part 10]
The Property Tax and Insulation Assistance Act [Part V, and section 1 and Part VI as they relate to subjects covered under Part V]
The Regional Waste Management Authorities Act
The Renewable Energy Jobs Act
The Soldiers’ Taxation Relief Act
The Unconditional Grants Act
The Manitoba Water Services Board Act
The Taxicab Act

== See also ==
- List of Manitoba government departments and agencies
