= Salomon Hamelin =

Salomon Hamelin (April 6, 1810 – September 10, 1893) was a political figure in Manitoba who served in the Legislative Council of Manitoba from 1871 to 1876.

He was the son of Jacques Hamelin and Angelique Tourengeau. In 1831, he married Isabella Vandale. Hamelin ran unsuccessfully for a seat in the Legislative Assembly of Manitoba in 1878, losing to Joseph Royal. He died in Sainte Rose du Lac at the age of 83.

His grandson Joseph Hamelin served in the Manitoba Legislative Assembly. The singer Ray St. Germain is also a descendant of Hamelin.
