= Ste. Rose (electoral district) =

Defunct provincial electoral district in Manitoba, Canada

Coordinates: 50.764°N 99.052°W

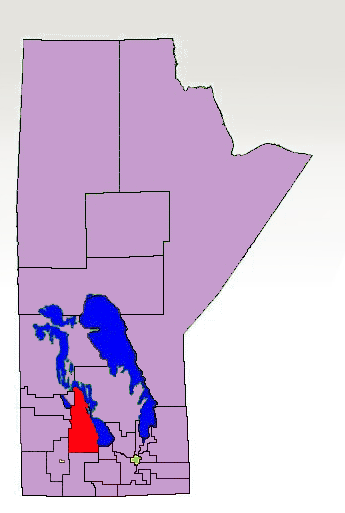
The 1998–2011 borders for Ste. Rose highlighted in red

Ste. Rose was a provincial electoral district of Manitoba, Canada. It was created by redistribution in 1914, and existed until 2011.

Ste. Rose was located in the southwestern section of the province. It was bordered to the north by Swan River, to the west by Russell, Dauphin-Roblin, and Minnedosa, to the south by Turtle Mountain and to the east by Lake Manitoba.

Communities in the riding included Gladstone, Neepawa, McCreary, Ste. Rose, Ste. Rose du Lac and Westbourne.

== Demographics ==
The riding's population in 1996 was 19,038. In 1999, the average family income was $36,883, and the unemployment rate was 7.60%. Much of the riding was farmland and agriculture accounted for 29% of its industry, followed by health and social services at 11%. Twenty-six per cent of Ste. Rose's population was aboriginal, and 8% were German. There was once a significant francophone population in this region, and 4% of the riding's residents listed themselves as francophone. Over 25% of the population had less than a Grade Nine education, one of the highest rates in the province.

== History ==
From the 1930s to the 1970s, Ste. Rose was a safe seat for the Manitoba Liberal Party (formerly known as the Liberal-Progressive Party). The New Democratic Party held the seat from 1971 to 1986, at which time it was won by Glen Cummings of the Progressive Conservative Party. He held the seat until 2007 when he retired. The riding was subsequently won by Progressive Conservative Party candidate Stu Briese.

Following the 2008 electoral redistribution, Ste. Rose was dissolved into the riding of Interlake and the new ridings of Dauphin and Agassiz. This change took effect for the 2011 election.

== Members of the Legislative Assembly ==
Name	Party	Took office	Left office
Joseph Hamelin	Cons	1914	1920(?)
	Independent/Conservative	1920(?)	1927
Maurice Dane MacCarthy	Prog	1927	1932
	Lib-Prog	1932	1953
Gildas Molgat	Lib-Prog	1953	1961
	Lib	1961	1970
Aime Adam	NDP	1971	1986
Glen Cummings	PC	1986	2007
Stu Briese	PC	2007	2011

== Electoral results ==
=== 1914 ===
1914 Manitoba general election
Party	Candidate	Votes	%
Conservative	Joseph Hamelin	596	52.65
Liberal	John A. Campbell	536	47.35
Total valid votes		1,132	–
Rejected		N/A	–
Eligible voters / Turnout		1,338	84.60
Source(s) Source: Manitoba. Chief Electoral Officer (1999). Statement of Votes for the 37th Provincial General Election, September 21, 1999 (PDF) (Report). Winnipeg: Elections Manitoba.

=== 1915 ===
1915 Manitoba general election
Party	Candidate	Votes	%	±%
Conservative	Joseph Hamelin	443	39.45	-13.20
Liberal	Zatque H. Rheaume	414	36.87	-10.48
Independent	Albert McLeod	266	23.69	–
Total valid votes		1,123	–	–
Rejected		N/A	–	
Eligible voters / Turnout		1,499	74.92	-9.69
Source(s) Source: Manitoba. Chief Electoral Officer (1999). Statement of Votes for the 37th Provincial General Election, September 21, 1999 (PDF) (Report). Winnipeg: Elections Manitoba.

=== 1920 ===
1920 Manitoba general election
Party	Candidate	Votes	%	±%
Conservative	Joseph Hamelin	878	41.59	2.14
Liberal	D. J. Hill	745	35.29	-1.57
Liberal	T. H. Rheaume	488	23.12	-13.75
Total valid votes		2,111	–	–
Rejected		N/A	–	
Eligible voters / Turnout		3,508	60.18	-14.74
Source(s) Source: Manitoba. Chief Electoral Officer (1999). Statement of Votes for the 37th Provincial General Election, September 21, 1999 (PDF) (Report). Winnipeg: Elections Manitoba.

=== 1922 ===
1922 Manitoba general election
Party	Candidate	Votes	%	±%
Independent	Joseph Hamelin	1,362	51.71	–
United Farmers	Thomas McDonald	1,272	48.29	–
Total valid votes		2,634	–	–
Rejected		N/A	–	
Eligible voters / Turnout		4,410	59.73	-0.45
Source(s) Source: Manitoba. Chief Electoral Officer (1999). Statement of Votes for the 37th Provincial General Election, September 21, 1999 (PDF) (Report). Winnipeg: Elections Manitoba.

=== 1927 ===
1927 Manitoba general election
Party	Candidate	Votes	%	±%
Progressive	Maurice Dane MacCarthy	1,161	46.83	–
Conservative	Joseph Hamelin	960	38.73	–
Liberal	Arthur Hurst	358	14.44	–
Total valid votes		2,479	–	–
Rejected		N/A	–	
Eligible voters / Turnout		4,122	60.14	0.41
Source(s) Source: Manitoba. Chief Electoral Officer (1999). Statement of Votes for the 37th Provincial General Election, September 21, 1999 (PDF) (Report). Winnipeg: Elections Manitoba.

=== 1932 ===
1932 Manitoba general election
Party	Candidate	Votes	%	±%
Liberal–Progressive	Maurice Dane MacCarthy	1,959	61.95	–
Conservative	Robert Doucette	1,203	38.05	-0.68
Total valid votes		3,162	–	–
Rejected		N/A	–	
Eligible voters / Turnout		4,289	73.72	13.58
Source(s) Source: Manitoba. Chief Electoral Officer (1999). Statement of Votes for the 37th Provincial General Election, September 21, 1999 (PDF) (Report). Winnipeg: Elections Manitoba.

=== 1936 ===
1936 Manitoba general election
Party	Candidate	Votes	%	±%
Liberal–Progressive	Maurice Dane MacCarthy	1,592	45.75	-16.21
Conservative	Earlston Stuart Everall	1,097	31.52	-6.52
Independent Labour	J. S. Zaplitny	791	22.73	–
Total valid votes		3,480	–	–
Rejected		37	–	
Eligible voters / Turnout		4,994	70.42	-3.30
Source(s) Source: Manitoba. Chief Electoral Officer (1999). Statement of Votes for the 37th Provincial General Election, September 21, 1999 (PDF) (Report). Winnipeg: Elections Manitoba.

=== 1941 ===
1941 Manitoba general election
Party	Candidate	Votes	%	±%
Liberal–Progressive	Maurice Dane MacCarthy	1,624	53.26	7.52
Social Credit	Paul Prince	1,425	46.74	–
Total valid votes		3,049	–	–
Rejected		26	–	
Eligible voters / Turnout		5,228	58.82	-11.61
Source(s) Source: Manitoba. Chief Electoral Officer (1999). Statement of Votes for the 37th Provincial General Election, September 21, 1999 (PDF) (Report). Winnipeg: Elections Manitoba.

=== 1945 ===
1945 Manitoba general election
Party	Candidate	Votes	%	±%
Liberal–Progressive	Maurice Dane MacCarthy	1,907	69.85	16.59
Co-operative Commonwealth	Jake Heesaker	823	30.15	–
Total valid votes		2,730	–	–
Rejected		40	–	
Eligible voters / Turnout		5,191	53.36	-5.46
Source(s) Source: Manitoba. Chief Electoral Officer (1999). Statement of Votes for the 37th Provincial General Election, September 21, 1999 (PDF) (Report). Winnipeg: Elections Manitoba.

=== 1949 ===
1949 Manitoba general election
Party	Candidate	Votes	%	±%
Liberal–Progressive	Maurice Dane MacCarthy		0.00	-69.85
Total valid votes			–	–
Rejected		N/A	–	
Eligible voters / Turnout		4,953	0.00	-53.36
Source(s) Source: Manitoba. Chief Electoral Officer (1999). Statement of Votes for the 37th Provincial General Election, September 21, 1999 (PDF) (Report). Winnipeg: Elections Manitoba.

=== 1953 ===
1953 Manitoba general election
Party	Candidate	Votes	%	±%
Liberal–Progressive	Gildas Molgat	1,561	50.88	–
Independent Liberal	James Albert Fletcher	1,166	38.01	–
Social Credit	Antoine Pineau	341	11.11	–
Total valid votes		3,068	–	–
Rejected		76	–	
Eligible voters / Turnout		4,932	63.75	63.75
Source(s) Source: Manitoba. Chief Electoral Officer (1999). Statement of Votes for the 37th Provincial General Election, September 21, 1999 (PDF) (Report). Winnipeg: Elections Manitoba.

=== 1958 ===
1958 Manitoba general election
Party	Candidate	Votes	%	±%
Liberal–Progressive	Gildas Molgat	2,400	57.43	6.55
Progressive Conservative	Alvin Getz	1,010	24.17	–
Social Credit	Alphonse Bouchard	415	9.93	-1.18
Co-operative Commonwealth	Leon W. Hoefer	354	8.47	–
Total valid votes		4,179	–	–
Rejected		36	–	
Eligible voters / Turnout		6,086	69.26	5.51
Source(s) Source: Manitoba. Chief Electoral Officer (1999). Statement of Votes for the 37th Provincial General Election, September 21, 1999 (PDF) (Report). Winnipeg: Elections Manitoba.

=== 1959 ===
1959 Manitoba general election
Party	Candidate	Votes	%	±%
Liberal–Progressive	Gildas Molgat	2,390	55.34	-2.09
Progressive Conservative	Albert Fletcher	1,576	36.49	12.32
Co-operative Commonwealth	Leon W. Hoefer	353	8.17	-0.30
Total valid votes		4,319	–	–
Rejected		25	–	
Eligible voters / Turnout		6,067	71.60	2.34
Source(s) Source: Manitoba. Chief Electoral Officer (1999). Statement of Votes for the 37th Provincial General Election, September 21, 1999 (PDF) (Report). Winnipeg: Elections Manitoba.

=== 1962 ===
1962 Manitoba general election
Party	Candidate	Votes	%	±%
Liberal	Gildas Molgat	2,648	62.13	–
Progressive Conservative	J. Albert Fletcher	1,467	34.42	-2.07
New Democratic	Leon W. Hoefer	147	3.45	–
Total valid votes		4,262	–	–
Rejected		31	–	
Eligible voters / Turnout		6,008	71.45	-0.15
Source(s) Source: Manitoba. Chief Electoral Officer (1999). Statement of Votes for the 37th Provincial General Election, September 21, 1999 (PDF) (Report). Winnipeg: Elections Manitoba.

=== 1966 ===
1966 Manitoba general election
Party	Candidate	Votes	%	±%
Liberal	Gildas Molgat	2,410	60.89	-1.24
Progressive Conservative	Michael "Mike" Posmituck	1,187	29.99	-4.43
Social Credit	David L. G. Dunning	275	6.95	–
New Democratic	Harry Shafransky	86	2.17	-1.28
Total valid votes		3,958	–	–
Rejected		19	–	
Eligible voters / Turnout		5,730	69.41	-2.05
Source(s) Source: Manitoba. Chief Electoral Officer (1999). Statement of Votes for the 37th Provincial General Election, September 21, 1999 (PDF) (Report). Winnipeg: Elections Manitoba.

=== 1969 ===
1969 Manitoba general election
Party	Candidate	Votes	%	±%
Liberal	Gildas Molgat	2,247	49.80	-11.09
Progressive Conservative	Heinz Marohn	1,198	26.55	-3.44
New Democratic	Leon Hoefer	754	16.71	14.54
Social Credit	Norma Oswald	313	6.94	-0.01
Total valid votes		4,512	–	–
Rejected		29	–	
Eligible voters / Turnout		7,379	61.54	-7.87
Source(s) Source: Manitoba. Chief Electoral Officer (1999). Statement of Votes for the 37th Provincial General Election, September 21, 1999 (PDF) (Report). Winnipeg: Elections Manitoba.

=== 1971 by-election ===
Manitoba provincial by-election, April 5, 1971 Resignation of Gildas Molgat
Party	Candidate	Votes	%	±%
New Democratic	Aimé Adam	2,785	41.60	24.89
Liberal	Fred Werbiski	2,118	31.64	-18.16
Progressive Conservative	John Boerchers	1,792	26.77	0.21
Total valid votes		6,695	–	–
Rejected		N/A	–	
Eligible voters / Turnout		N/A	–	–
Source(s) Source: Manitoba. Chief Electoral Officer (1999). Statement of Votes for the 37th Provincial General Election, September 21, 1999 (PDF) (Report). Winnipeg: Elections Manitoba.

=== 1973 ===
1973 Manitoba general election
Party	Candidate	Votes	%	±%
New Democratic	Aimé Adam	2,627	44.59	3.00
Liberal	Dwight Hopfner	1,748	29.67	-1.96
Progressive Conservative	Alf O'Loughlin	1,516	25.73	-1.03
Total valid votes		5,891	–	–
Rejected		44	–	
Eligible voters / Turnout		7,931	74.83	–
Source(s) Source: Manitoba. Chief Electoral Officer (1999). Statement of Votes for the 37th Provincial General Election, September 21, 1999 (PDF) (Report). Winnipeg: Elections Manitoba.

=== 1977 ===
1977 Manitoba general election
Party	Candidate	Votes	%	±%
New Democratic	Aimé Adam	2,611	46.13	1.54
Progressive Conservative	Arthur Erickson	1,830	32.33	6.60
Liberal	John Fleming	1,219	21.54	-8.14
Total valid votes		5,660	–	–
Rejected		9	–	
Eligible voters / Turnout		8,218	68.98	-5.85
Source(s) Source: Manitoba. Chief Electoral Officer (1999). Statement of Votes for the 37th Provincial General Election, September 21, 1999 (PDF) (Report). Winnipeg: Elections Manitoba.

=== 1981 ===
1981 Manitoba general election
Party	Candidate	Votes	%	±%
New Democratic	Aimé Adam	4,031	50.09	3.96
Progressive Conservative	Ivan Traill	3,823	47.50	15.17
Progressive	Valerie Wilson	194	2.41	–
Total valid votes		8,048	–	–
Rejected		23	–	
Eligible voters / Turnout		11,036	73.13	4.15
Source(s) Source: Manitoba. Chief Electoral Officer (1999). Statement of Votes for the 37th Provincial General Election, September 21, 1999 (PDF) (Report). Winnipeg: Elections Manitoba.

=== 1986 ===
1986 Manitoba general election
Party	Candidate	Votes	%	±%
Progressive Conservative	Glen Cummings	3,735	45.77	-1.74
New Democratic	Garry Anderson	3,020	37.01	-13.08
Liberal	Rafi Mohammed	952	11.67	–
Confederation of Regions	Dave Mutch	454	5.56	–
Total valid votes		8,161	–	–
Rejected		18	–	
Eligible voters / Turnout		11,258	72.65	-0.48
Source(s) Source: Manitoba. Chief Electoral Officer (1999). Statement of Votes for the 37th Provincial General Election, September 21, 1999 (PDF) (Report). Winnipeg: Elections Manitoba.

=== 1988 ===
1988 Manitoba general election
Party	Candidate	Votes	%	±%
Progressive Conservative	Glen Cummings	3,723	46.15	0.38
Liberal	Brent Johnson	2,631	32.61	20.95
New Democratic	Gerald Follows	1,464	18.15	-18.86
Confederation of Regions	David Mutch	249	3.09	-2.48
Total valid votes		8,067	–	–
Rejected		10	–	
Eligible voters / Turnout		11,375	71.01	-1.64
Source(s) Source: Manitoba. Chief Electoral Officer (1999). Statement of Votes for the 37th Provincial General Election, September 21, 1999 (PDF) (Report). Winnipeg: Elections Manitoba.

=== 1990 ===
1990 Manitoba general election
Party	Candidate	Votes	%	±%
Progressive Conservative	Glen Cummings	3,646	51.58	5.43
Liberal	Ivan Traill	1,882	26.63	-5.99
New Democratic	Sam Voisey	1,540	21.79	3.64
Total valid votes		7,068	–	–
Rejected		15	–	
Eligible voters / Turnout		11,497	61.61	-9.40
Source(s) Source: Manitoba. Chief Electoral Officer (1999). Statement of Votes for the 37th Provincial General Election, September 21, 1999 (PDF) (Report). Winnipeg: Elections Manitoba.

=== 1995 ===
1995 Manitoba general election
Party	Candidate	Votes	%	±%
Progressive Conservative	Glen Cummings	3,762	51.99	0.41
New Democratic	John Morrisseau	2,341	32.35	10.56
Liberal	David Martin	1,133	15.66	-10.97
Total valid votes		7,236	–	–
Rejected		25	–	
Eligible voters / Turnout		11,532	62.96	1.36
Source(s) Source: Manitoba. Chief Electoral Officer (1999). Statement of Votes for the 37th Provincial General Election, September 21, 1999 (PDF) (Report). Winnipeg: Elections Manitoba.

=== 1999 ===
1999 Manitoba general election
Party	Candidate	Votes	%	±%	Expenditures
Progressive Conservative	Glen Cummings	3,871	49.92	-2.07	$25,226.25
New Democratic	Louise Wilson	3,293	42.46	10.11	$20,154.00
Liberal	Fred Juskowiak	591	7.62	-8.04	$9,389.28
Total valid votes		7,755	–	–	
Rejected		38	–		
Eligible voters / turnout		12,580	61.95	-1.02	
Source(s) Source: Manitoba. Chief Electoral Officer (1999). Statement of Votes for the 37th Provincial General Election, September 21, 1999 (PDF) (Report). Winnipeg: Elections Manitoba.

=== 2003 ===
2003 Manitoba general election
Party	Candidate	Votes	%	±%
Progressive Conservative	Glen Cummings	3,709	56.64	6.73
New Democratic	John Harapiak	2,301	35.14	-7.32
Liberal	Wendy Menzies	538	8.22	0.60
Total valid votes		6,548	–	–
Rejected		18	–	
Eligible voters / Turnout		12,454	52.72	-9.23
Source(s) Source: Manitoba. Chief Electoral Officer (2003). Statement of Votes for the 38th Provincial General Election, June 3, 2003 (PDF) (Report). Winnipeg: Elections Manitoba.

=== 2007 ===
2007 Manitoba general election
Party	Candidate	Votes	%	±%	Expenditures
Progressive Conservative	Stu Briese	3,599	59.14	2.49	$18,703.39
New Democratic	Denise Harder	2,022	33.22	-1.92	$5,421.04
Liberal	Janelle Mailhot	465	7.64	-0.58	$606.90
Total valid votes		6,086	–	–	
Rejected		26	–		
Eligible voters / turnout		12,054	50.71	-2.02	
Source(s) Source: Manitoba. Chief Electoral Officer (2007). Statement of Votes for the 39th Provincial General Election, May 22, 2007 (PDF) (Report). Winnipeg: Elections Manitoba.

== See also ==
- List of Manitoba provincial electoral districts
- Canadian provincial electoral districts
