= Maurice Dane MacCarthy =

Canadian politician

Maurice Dane MacCarthy (May 11, 1878 – June 7, 1953) was a politician in Manitoba, Canada. He served in the Legislative Assembly of Manitoba from 1927 to 1953.

MacCarthy was born in Bracebridge, Ontario, the son of John Maurice MacCarthy and Ann Cooper, and was educated in that city. He worked as a farmer. In 1907, he married Frances Mary Tucker. A Roman Catholic, MacCarthy was also a member of the Knights of Columbus.

He was first elected to the Manitoba legislature in the 1927 election, for the rural constituency of Ste. Rose in the western part of the province. MacCarthy ran as a candidate of the Progressive Party, and defeated long-serving Conservative incumbent Joseph Hamelin by 224 votes. He was re-elected by an increased majority in the 1932 election, and was again returned to the legislature in the campaigns of 1936, 1941, 1945 and 1949. Following the merger of the Liberal and Progressive parties in 1932, he served as a Liberal-Progressive.

His only difficult bid for re-election came in 1941, when he defeated Social Credit candidate Paul Prince by 199 votes. He served as a government backbencher for his entire career in the legislature.

MacCarthy died at age seventy-five, one day before the 1953 provincial election, while seeking a seventh term in the legislature. He suffered a stroke at a political meeting, and died in hospital the same night. There is some confusion as to whether he died on June 7 or June 8, though newspaper reports from the period indicate the former.

On June 9, the Winnipeg Free Press newspaper published the following tribute: "The quiet-spoken member contributed little to the actual debates in the House, but no one would deny that he was most active on behalf of his constituency, and that in his own quiet, sincere and effective way he brought it benefits which a more vocal and less active member would have been unable to do."
