= Eileen Clarke (politician) =

Canadian provincial politician

Minister of Indigenous Reconciliation and Northern Relations
- In office January 30, 2023 – October 18, 2023
- Premier: Heather Stefanson
- Preceded by: Alan Lagimodiere
- Succeeded by: Wab Kinew (Indigenous reconciliation); Ian Bushie (Northern Relations)

Minister of Municipal Relations
- In office January 18, 2022 – January 30, 2023
- Premier: Heather Stefanson
- Preceded by: Derek Johnson
- Succeeded by: Andrew Smith

Minister of Indigenous and Northern Relations
- In office August 17, 2017 – July 15, 2021
- Premier: Brian Pallister
- Preceded by: Portfolio Renamed
- Succeeded by: Alan Lagimodiere

Minister of Indigenous and Municipal Relations
- In office April 19, 2016 – August 17, 2017
- Premier: Brian Pallister
- Preceded by: Eric Robinson
- Succeeded by: Portfolio Renamed

Member of the Legislative Assembly of Manitoba for Agassiz
- In office April 19, 2016 – September 5, 2023
- Preceded by: Stu Briese
- Succeeded by: Jodie Byram

Personal details
- Party: Progressive Conservative

Eileen Clarke is a Canadian provincial politician, who was elected as the Member of the Legislative Assembly of Manitoba for the riding of Agassiz in the 2016 election. She is a member of the Manitoba Progressive Conservative Party.

On 3 May 2016, Clarke was appointed to the Executive Council of Manitoba as Minister of Indigenous and Municipal Relations. On July 9, 2021, Clarke resigned from Cabinet following controversial comments made by the Premier of Manitoba, Brian Pallister, about the history of colonization in Canada.

She did not seek re-election in the 2023 Manitoba general election.
