= Manitoba Housing Authority =

Provincial Crown corporation in Manitoba, Canada

Manitoba Housing
Corporation overview
- Formed: 1967
- Type: Crown corporation
- Headquarters: 352 Donald St., Winnipeg, MB R3B 2H8
- Minister responsible: Bernadette Smith, Minister of Housing, Addictions and Homelessness
- Corporation executives: Michelle Dubik, Board Chair; Joseph Bradbury, CEO
- Parent department: Department of Families
- Key documents: The Housing and Renewal Corporation Act; The Cooperative Housing Strategy Act; The Elderly and Infirm Persons’ Housing Act

Manitoba Housing, legally incorporated as the Manitoba Housing and Renewal Corporation (MHRC), is a crown corporation under the provincial Department of Families responsible for developing and managing public housing policies and programs in Manitoba.

The agency provides subsidies to around 35,000 housing units in the province.

MHRC was created in 1967 via The Housing and Renewal Corporation Act. It is governed by a board of directors, with policy direction provided by the government. The Deputy Minister of Housing and Community Development serves as chair of the board.
