= Manitoba Agriculture =

Department of the Government of Manitoba

Department overview
- Formed: November 4, 2003
- Preceding agencies: Manitoba Agriculture and Food; Manitoba Rural Initiatives and Cooperative Development
- Jurisdiction: Government of Manitoba
- Headquarters: 915 - 401 York Ave, Winnipeg, MB R3C 0P8
- Employees: 618.23 FTE
- Annual budget: CAD$220 million (2009-2010)
- Minister responsible: Ron Kostyshyn, Minister of Agriculture
- Deputy Minister responsible: Dori Gingera-Beauchemin, Deputy Minister of Agriculture
- Child Department: Manitoba Agricultural Services Corporation
- Key document: The Department of Agriculture and Resource Development Act
- Website: www.gov.mb.ca/agriculture

Manitoba Agriculture—officially the Department of Agriculture and Resource Development (ARD; French: Agriculture et Développement des ressources)—is the department of the Government of Manitoba responsible for the agriculture and natural resources sectors in Manitoba, including agrifood, agriproduct, and food safety, as well as animal health and welfare.

The department was formerly called Manitoba Agriculture, Food and Rural Initiatives. It is overseen by the Minister of Agriculture, who is currently Ron Kostyshyn.

== Branches and child organizations ==
The Animal Health and Welfare branch, headed by the Chief Veterinary Officer (CVO), is responsible for animal health, welfare, and protection in Manitoba. The current CVO of Manitoba is Dr. Scott Zaari.

The CVO regulates the following legislation:

- The Animal Care Act
- The Animal Diseases Act
- The Dairy Act
- The Livestock Industry Diversification Act
- The Livestock and Livestock Products Act

=== Agencies and boards ===
Agencies and boards under Manitoba Agriculture include the following:

- Agricultural Services Corporation — "encourages the sustainability, development and diversification of agriculture and the rural economy of Manitoba."
- Manitoba Agriculture Research and Innovation Committee (MARIC) — "helps direct research that accelerates the Agri-Food sector’s contribution to economic growth."
- Animal Care Appeal Board — independent appeal body that holds and adjudicates hearings regarding "animal seizures, orders and adverse licensing decisions."
- Appeal Tribunal — body that hears and determines appeals under section 44 of The Manitoba Agricultural Services Corporation Act and section 7.6 of The Crown Lands Act.
- Manitoba Association of Agricultural Societies (MAAS) — organization representing agricultural societies in Manitoba. The Board is composed of civil servants and representatives of non-governmental organizations.
- Beverly Qamanirjuaq Caribou Management Board (BQCMB) — coordinates the management of the Beverly and Qamanirjuaq barren-ground caribou herds, as per the Beverly and Qamanirjuaq Barren Ground Caribou Management Agreement signed by the governments of Canada, Manitoba, Saskatchewan, the Northwest Territories, and Nunavut.
- Conservation Agreements Board
- Manitoba Farm Industry Board
- Farm Management Canada (FMC)
- Manitoba Farm Products Marketing Council
- Fish and Wildlife Enhancement Fund
- Surface Rights Board — a quasi-judicial board that administers and enforces the Surface Rights Act by resolving land-access and development disputes between "oil and gas development proponents and surface rights holders."
- Manitoba Veterinary Medical Association Council (MVMA) — passes by-laws that govern the practice of veterinary medicine in Manitoba.
- Veterinary Services Commission
- Manitoba Women’s Institute (MWI) — an organization purposed towards improving "the lives of rural women by supporting them through personal development, building leadership skills, family, agriculture, rural development, and community action." It is a member of the Associated Country Women of the World (ACWW) and the Federated Women's Institute of Canada (FWIC/WI Canada).

=== Agricultural Services Corporation ===
Manitoba Agricultural Services Corporation
Corporation overview
- Formed: 1 September 2005
- Preceding agencies: Manitoba Crop Insurance Corporation; Manitoba Agricultural Credit Corporation
- Type: Crown corporation
- Employees: 150 full-time, 160 part-time (2021)
- Corporation executives: James Wilson, Chair; Jared Munro, President & CEO
- Website: masc.mb.ca/

The Manitoba Agricultural Services Corporation (MASC) is a Crown corporation of the Manitoba government under the agriculture ministry created to provide land-based products and services that support the growth of agriculture in Manitoba.

It was established in 2005 by The Manitoba Agricultural Services Corporation Act, amalgamated the Manitoba Agricultural Credit Corporation (MACC) and the Manitoba Crop Insurance Corporation (MCIC).

=== Farm Industry Board ===
The Manitoba Farm Industry Board was established to administer and enforces the provincial Farm Lands Ownership Act, a statute that preserves farm land for Canadian use by limiting foreign interest in Manitoba farm land to 40 acres (160,000 m^{2}).

== Acts administered ==
=== Provincial legislation ===
- The Agricultural Producers' Organization Funding Act
- The Agri-Food and Rural Development Council Act
- The Manitoba Agricultural Services Corporation Act
- The Agricultural Societies Act
- The Department of Agriculture, Food and Rural Initiatives Act
- The Agrologists Act
- The Animal Care Act
- The Animal Diseases Act
- The Animal Liability Act
- The Bee Act
- The Cattle Producers' Act
- The Coarse Grain Marketing Control Act
- The Community Development Bonds Act
- The Cooperative Promotion Trust Act
- The Crown Lands Act — enables the administration of agricultural Crown lands.
- The Dairy Act — enabling legislation for dairy farm and dairy processors to produce dairy products within the province.
- The Family Farm Protection Act
- The Farm Income Assurance Plans Act
- The Farm Lands Ownership Act — legislation limiting foreign interest in Manitoba farm land to 40 acres (160,000 m^{2}), thereby preserving farm land for Canadian use.
- to limit speculation and support the development of strong rural communities.
- The Farm Machinery and Equipment Act
- The Farm Practices Protection Act
- The Farm Products Marketing Act
- The Fruit and Vegetables Sales Act
- The Horse Racing Commission Act
- The Land Rehabilitation Act
- The Livestock and Livestock Products Act — enabling legislation for animal operation within Manitoba.
- The Livestock Industry Diversification Act — the statute regarding animal protection in game animal production within Manitoba
- The Milk Prices Review Act
- The Noxious Weed Act
- The Pesticides and Fertilizers Control Act
- The Planning Act — legislation setting out roles and responsibilities for local governments as they develop land-use plans and zoning bylaws.
- The Plant Pests and Disease Act
- The Public Health Act — enabling legislation for food and food-handling establishments including abattoirs.
- The Seed and Fodder Relief Act
- The Veterinary Medical Act
- The Veterinary Science Scholarship Fund Act
- The Veterinary Services Act
- The Wildlife Act
- The Women's Institute Act

=== Federal legislation ===
- Food and Drugs Act — legislation concerned with health, safety, and economic fraud regarding food, drugs, cosmetics, and medical devices.
- Safe Food for Canadians Act — legislation establishing food safety and traceability requirements for "all food that is destined for interprovincial trade, exported or imported to Canada."

== See also ==
- Manitoba Agricultural Museum
