= Monarchy in Manitoba =

Function of the Canadian monarchy in Manitoba

King in Right of Manitoba
- Provincial
- Coat of arms of Manitoba

Incumbent
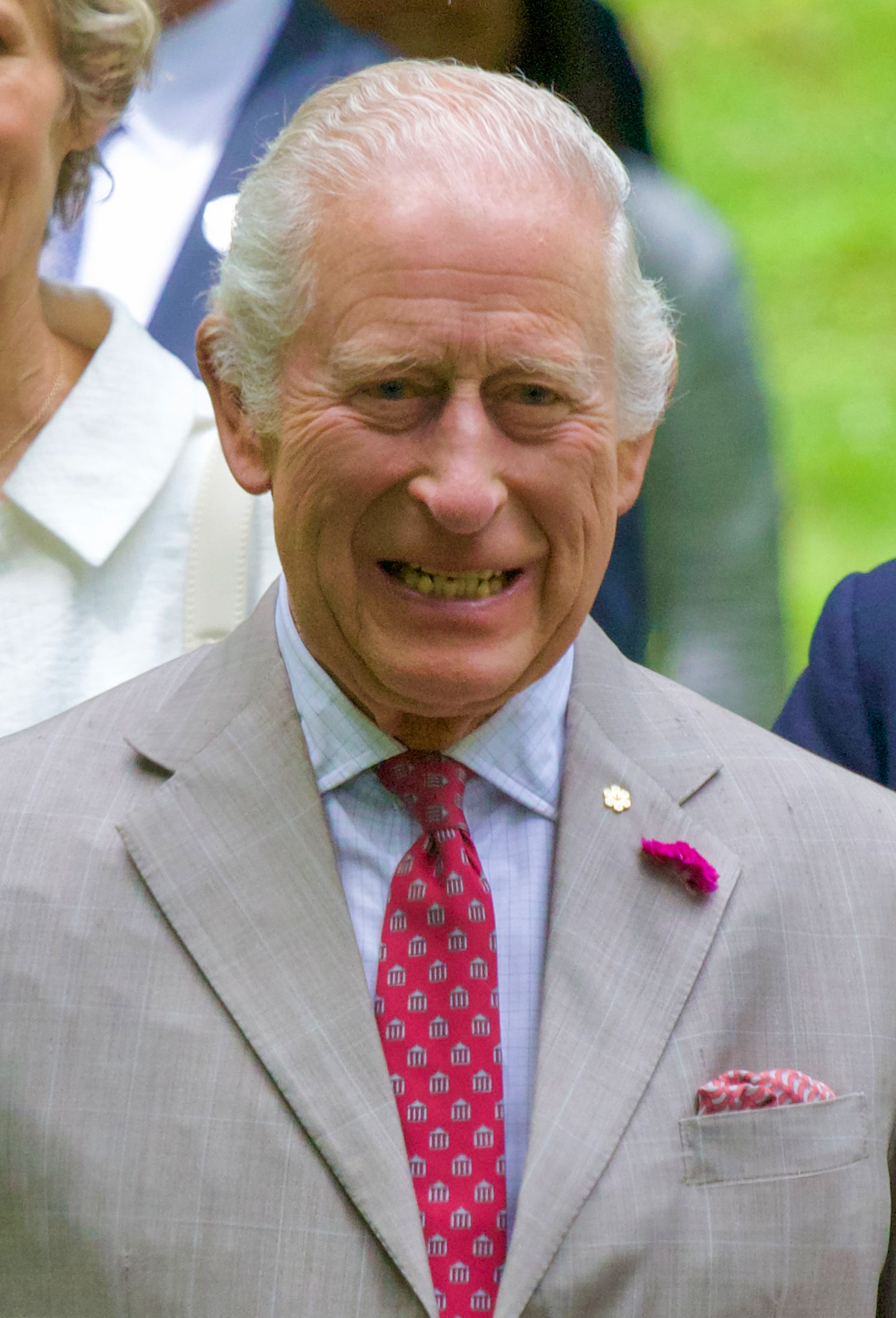
- Charles III; King of Canada since 8 September 2022

Details
- Style: His Majesty
- First monarch: Victoria
- Formed: 15 July 1870

By the arrangements of the Canadian federation, Canada's monarchy operates in Manitoba as the core of the province's Westminster-style parliamentary democracy. As such, the Crown within Manitoba's jurisdiction is referred to as the Crown in Right of Manitoba, His Majesty in Right of Manitoba, or the King in Right of Manitoba. The Constitution Act, 1867, however, leaves many royal duties in Manitoba specifically assigned to the sovereign's viceroy, the lieutenant governor of Manitoba, whose direct participation in governance is limited by the conventional stipulations of constitutional monarchy.

== Constitutional role ==
The role of the Crown is both legal and practical; it functions in Manitoba in the same way it does in all of Canada's other provinces, being the centre of a constitutional construct in which the institutions of government acting under the sovereign's authority share the power of the whole. It is thus the foundation of the executive, legislative, and judicial branches of the province's government. The Canadian monarch—since 8 September 2022, King Charles III—is represented and his duties carried out by the Lieutenant Governor of Manitoba, whose direct participation in governance is limited by the conventional stipulations of constitutional monarchy, with most related powers entrusted for exercise by the elected parliamentarians, the ministers of the Crown generally drawn from amongst them, and the judges and justices of the peace. The Crown today primarily functions as a guarantor of continuous and stable governance and a nonpartisan safeguard against the abuse of power. This arrangement began with the granting of royal assent to the 1870 Manitoba Act and continued an unbroken line of monarchical government extending back to the early 17th century. However, though Manitoba has a separate government headed by the King, as a province, Manitoba is not itself a kingdom.

Government House in Winnipeg is owned by the sovereign in his capacity as King in Right of Manitoba and used as an official residence by both the lieutenant governor and the sovereign. The lieutenant governor and Canadian royalty also have use of the Lieutenant Governor's Reception Room in the Manitoba Legislative Building.

== Royal associations ==
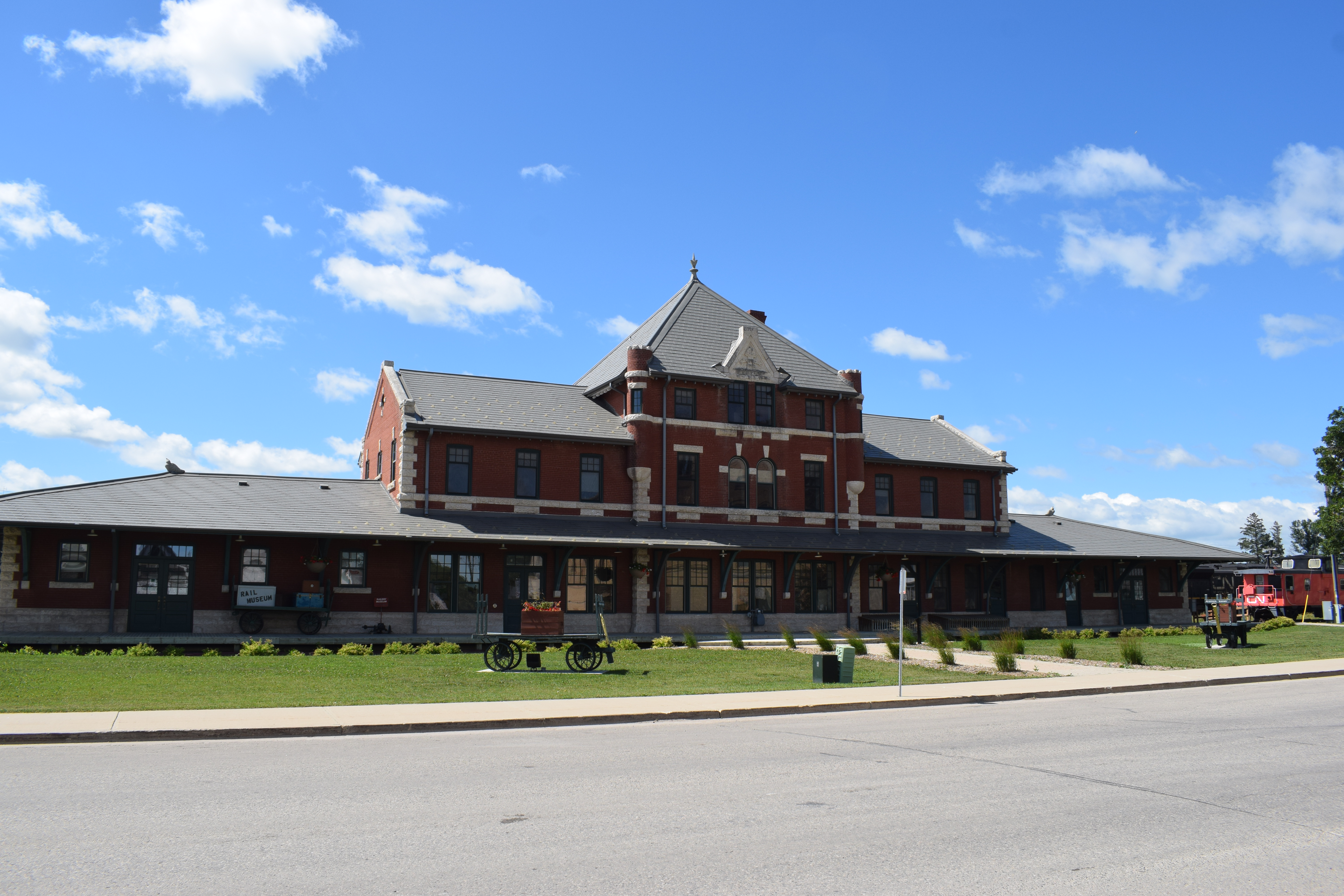
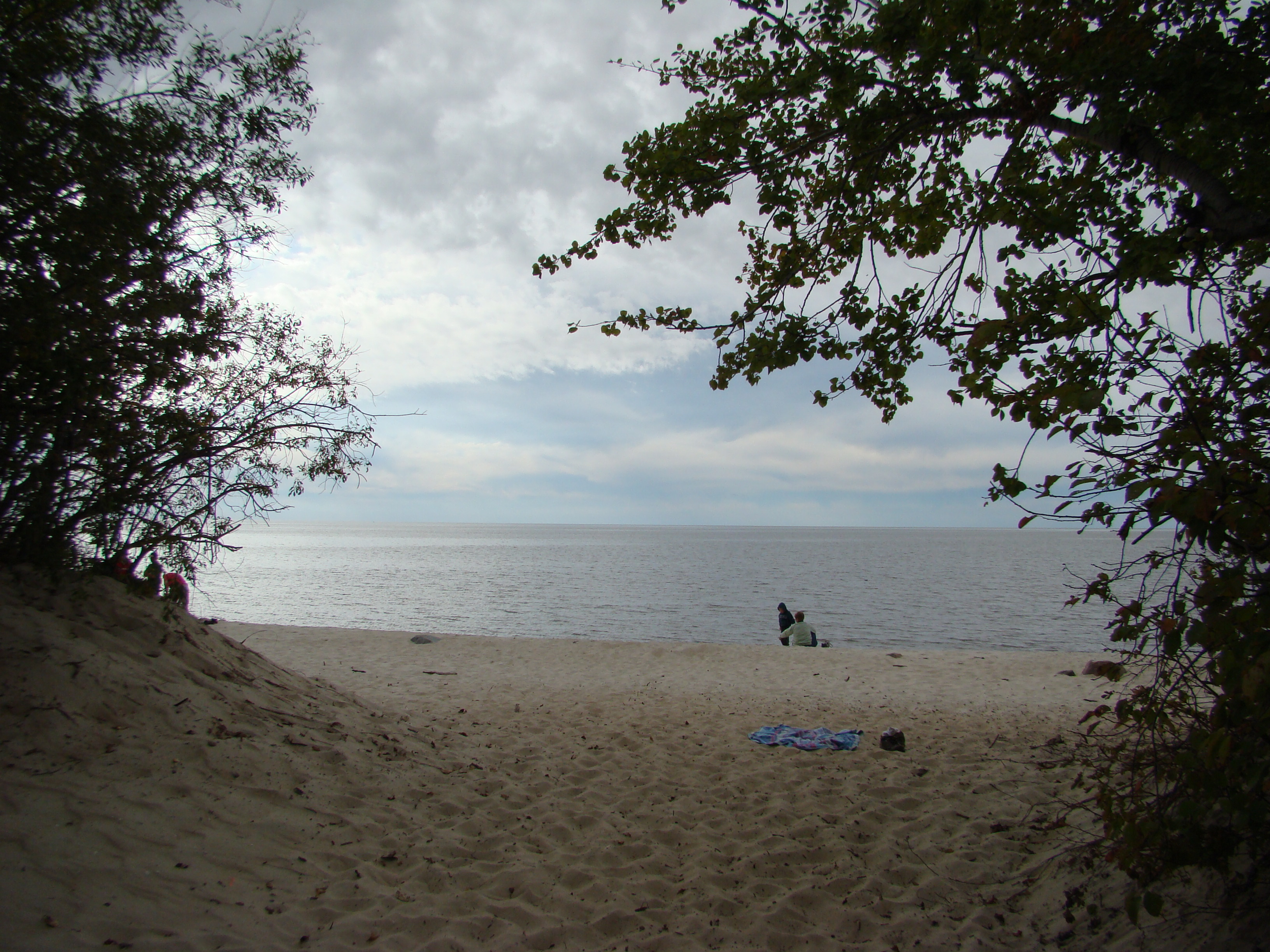
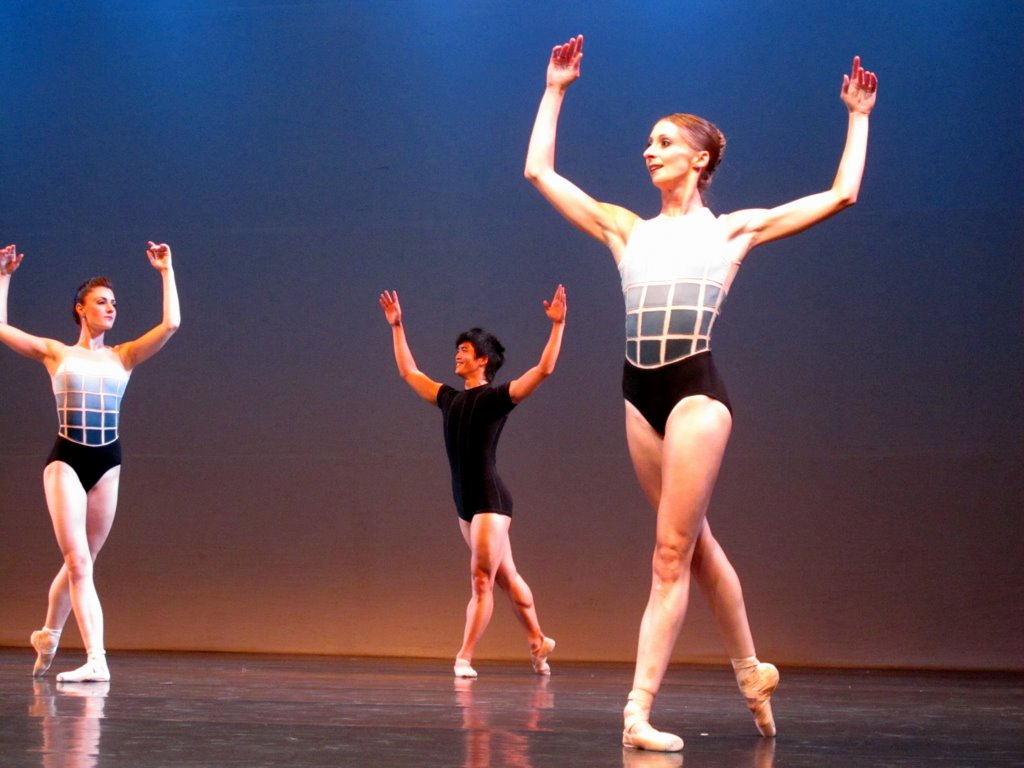
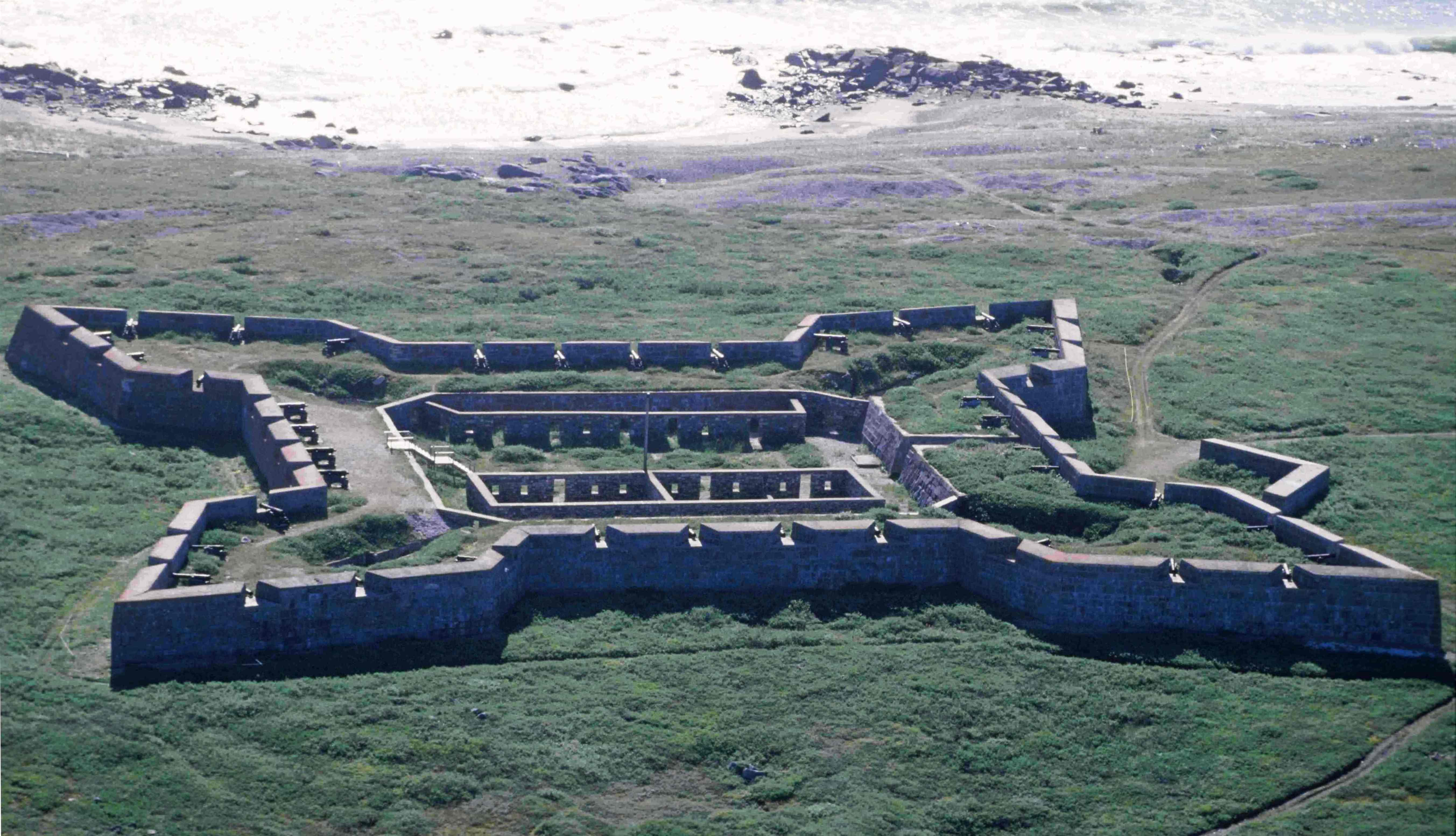
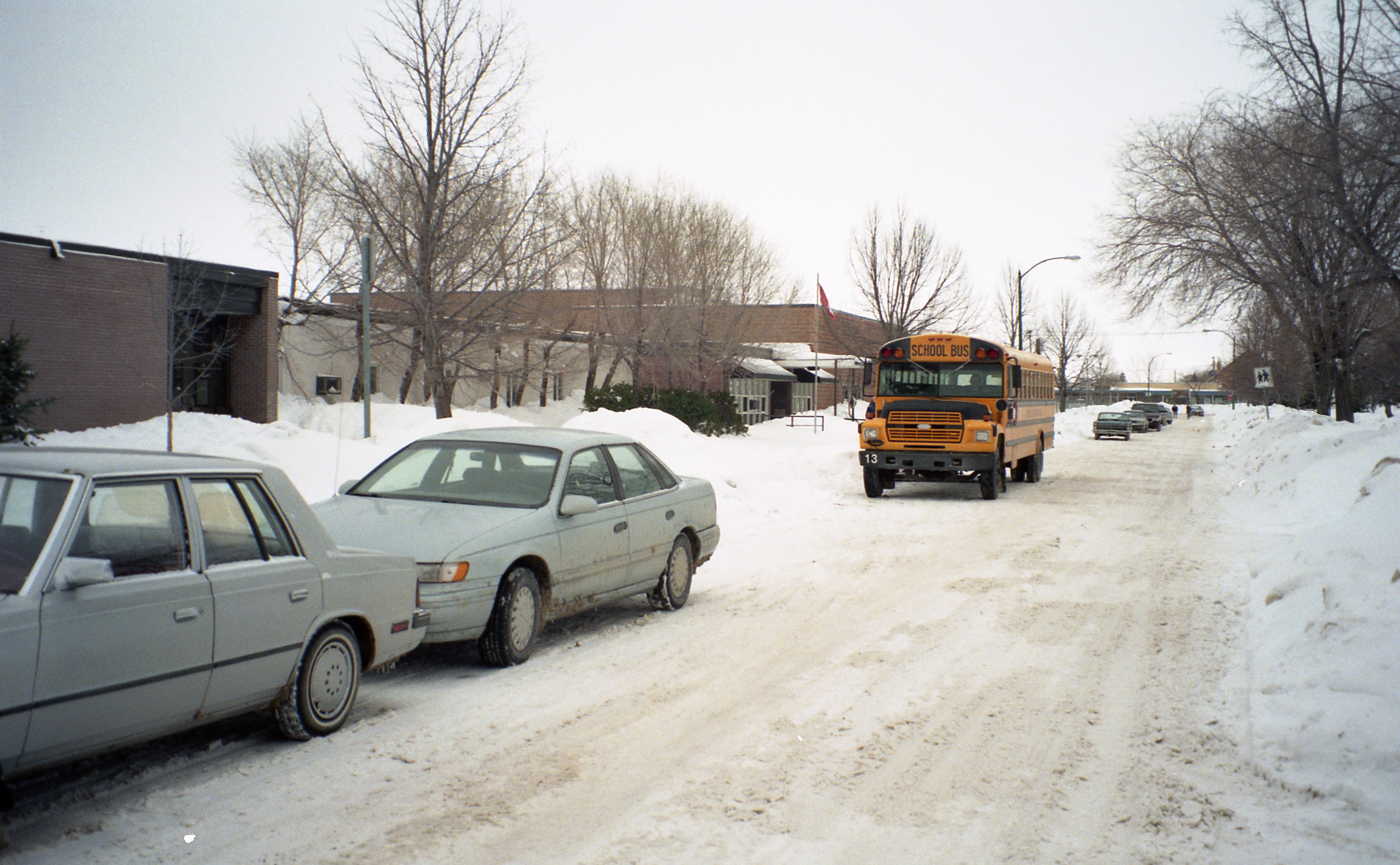
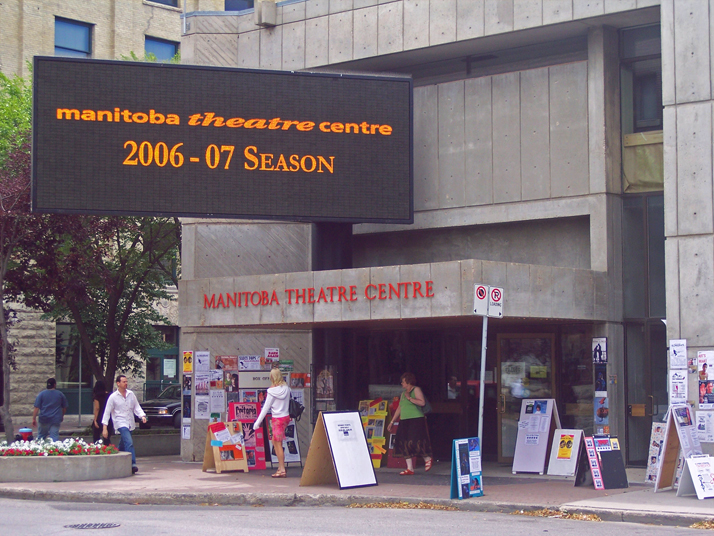
(Clockwise from top) The railway station in Dauphin, the eponym of Louis, Dauphin of France; performers in the Royal Winnipeg Ballet, 2010; Prince of Wales Fort, named for Prince George, Prince of Wales (later King George II); Princess Margaret School, Winnipeg, named for Princess Margaret, Countess of Snowdon; the Royal Manitoba Theatre Centre, which received its royal prefix from Queen Elizabeth II in 2010; Victoria Beach, on Lake Winnipeg, named for Queen Victoria

Those in the Royal Family perform ceremonial duties when on a tour of the province; the royal persons do not receive any personal income for their service, only the costs associated with the exercise of these obligations are funded by both the Canadian and Manitoba Crowns in their respective councils. Monuments around Manitoba mark some of those visits, while others honour a royal personage or event. Further, Manitoba's monarchical status is illustrated by royal names applied regions, communities, schools, and buildings, many of which may also have a specific history with a member or members of the Royal Family. Associations also exist between the Crown and many private organizations within the province; these may have been founded by a Royal Charter, received a royal prefix, and/or been honoured with the patronage of a member of the Royal Family. Examples include the Court of King's Bench of Manitoba, the Royal Manitoba Winter Fair, which was under the patronage of Queen Elizabeth II, and the Royal Lake of the Woods Yacht Club, which received its royal prefix from King George V in 1924. At the various levels of education within Alberta, there also exist a number of scholarships and academic awards either established by or named for royal persons.

The main symbol of the monarchy is the sovereign himself, his image (in portrait or effigy) thus being used to signify government authority. A royal cypher or crown may also illustrate the monarchy as the locus of authority, without referring to any specific monarch. Additionally, though the monarch does not form a part of the constitutions of Manitoba's honours, they do stem from the Crown as the fount of honour, and so bear on the insignia symbols of the sovereign.

=== Winnipeg Arena portraits of Queen Elizabeth II ===
Three large portraits of Queen Elizabeth II were created for Winnipeg Arena. The first was in place upon the rink's opening in 1955; it watched over game three of the 1972 Summit Series between the Soviet and Canadian national ice hockey teams.

Twenty-one years later, Lieutenant Governor William John McKeag commissioned billboard artist Gilbert Burch to create a new portrait, which was 4.2 metres (13.8 feet) square. It was not, however, considered a good likeness; Burch admitted as much, explaining he only had a tiny, poorly-lit photograph to work from. This prompted the commissioning of the third painting, which was a gift from Lieutenant Governor Francis Lawrence Jobin in 1978.

Also painted by Burch, using oil on plywood, the final iteration, five by seven metres (16.4 by 23 feet) in size, depicts the Queen in the gown she wore for the 1977 opening of the federal parliament, with her insignia of the Sovereign of the Order of Canada and Sovereign of the Order of Military Merit and, on her head, the Grand Duchess Vladimir Tiara. After it was installed the following year, when the Winnipeg Jets, housed in Winnipeg Arena, became a National Hockey League team, Jets players were known to try to hit the painting with pucks during practice.

When the Jets left the city for Phoenix, Arizona, in 1996, the portrait remained in the arena for another three years, thereafter being purchased by Syd Davy, President of the Royal Commonwealth Society, and then Vancouver-based singer-songwriter Tim Lawson, who put it in storage in Whitby, Ontario. The present owner, Ron D'Errico, has willed it to Brent Fitz; though, D'Errico would like to see it installed at the Canada Life Centre, where the Jets now play; the corporate ownership has not been receptive. It was put on display outside the Canada Life Centre when Winnipeg hosted the 2016 Heritage Classic and at Polo Park mall, near where Winnipeg Arena used to stand, as a form of tribute following the death of Elizabeth II in 2022.

== History ==
=== Rupert's Land to Confederation ===
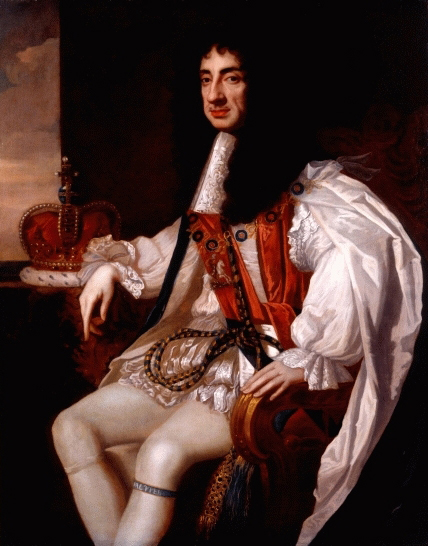
King Charles II in 1675

King Charles II in 1670 founded the Hudson's Bay Company by a royal charter that applied to the entire Hudson's Bay drainage basin, including the entirety of what is today Manitoba. The King gave governorship of the company to his cousin, Prince Rupert of the Rhine, and the territory came to be known as Rupert's Land.

When, in 1869, the newly confederated Canada sought to buy Rupert's Land from the United Kingdom, the Anglo-Métis and francophone Métis who comprised the Red River Colony, became concerned that their way of life would be threatened by increased Canadian migration, including possible confiscation of their farmland, to which they had only a tenuous right of occupancy. Louis Riel emerged as a Métis leader who asserted he and the Métis were loyal subjects of Queen Victoria, the then-reigning monarch of the UK and, consequently, Canada. (The Red River Colony's provisional government celebrated Victoria's birthday with a show of skill at the militia's drill.) However, tensions within the Métis community and with the Lieutenant Governor of the North-West Territories' Canadian government-appointed designate, William McDougal, led to the Red River Rebellion, in which Fort Garry was taken by Riel.

The Queen's Canadian representative, Governor General the Lord Lisgar, was advised by his Prime Minister, John A. Macdonald, to proclaim, on 6 December, an amnesty for all in the Red River area who would lay down their arms. Though the offer was ignored, negotiations between Riel's provisional government and the Canadian Cabinet continued and, on 12 May 1870, Lisgar granted royal assent to the Canadian parliament's Manitoba Act, 1870, creating an area around Winnipeg as the province of Manitoba.

In the aftermath of the Red River Rebellion, Lisgar's viceregal successor, the Earl of Dufferin, prevented the execution of Ambroise Lépine, a supporter of Riel who had executed Thomas Scott. Although Scott had been the son a tenant on Dufferin's estate in Northern Ireland, Dufferin heeded appeals from francophones in Quebec who were sympathetic to the Métis and reduced Lépine's sentence to two years in jail.

=== 20th century ===
In 1912, parts were put in the jurisdiction of the Crown in Right of Manitoba, to form the province's current borders.

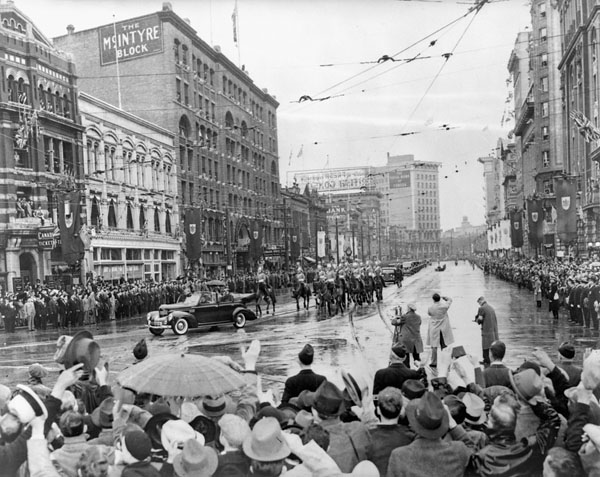
King George VI and Queen Elizabeth in Winnipeg, 1939

Queen Elizabeth II Platinum Jubilee Medal (Manitoba)

Princess Anne and her elder brother, Prince Charles, Prince of Wales, presided over the celebrations of the centennial of Manitoba's entry into Confederation in 1870.

=== 21st century ===
In 2022, Manitoba instituted a provincial Platinum Jubilee medal to mark the Queen's seventy years on the Canadian throne; the first time in Canada's history that a royal occasion was commemorated on provincial medals.

== See also ==
- Symbols of Manitoba
- Monarchy in Canada
