= Manitoba Indigenous Reconciliation and Northern Relations =

- Logo of the Manitoba Aboriginal and Northern Affairs (1999-2016)

Department overview
- Preceding Department: Manitoba Aboriginal and Northern Affairs (1999-2016)
- Jurisdiction: Government of Manitoba
- Headquarters: Winnipeg, Manitoba
- Employees: 94.00 FTE (2009-2010)
- Annual budget: $40.9 m CAD (2009-2010)
- Minister responsible: Eileen Clarke, Minister of Indigenous Reconciliation and Northern Relations
- Deputy Minister responsible: Michelle Dubik
- Key documents: Northern Affairs Act; Path to Reconciliation Act; Sioux Valley Dakota Nation Governance Act; Aboriginal Languages Recognition Act'
- Website: www.gov.mb.ca/inr/

Manitoba Indigenous Reconciliation—formerly Manitoba Aboriginal and Northern Affairs and Manitoba Indigenous Reconciliation and Northern Relations—is the department of the Manitoba government responsible for issues related to Indigenous affairs and reconciliation in the province, and regional economic development in northern Manitoba.

The department is headed by the Minister of Indigenous Reconciliation, currently Wab Kinew. As of 2021, there are 50 Northern Affairs communities over which the Minister has municipal authority.

== History ==
Following the reorganization of the Manitoba cabinet after the general election of 2016, most of the responsibilities of the preceding Department of Aboriginal and Northern Affairs were transferred to the new Ministry of Indigenous and Municipal Relations, under the direction of Eileen Clarke. Following the 2023 general election, Northern relations were moved to the Department of Municipal Relations, with Kinew assuming responsibility for Indigenous Relations.
