= 5th Manitoba Legislature =

The members of the 5th Manitoba Legislature were elected in the Manitoba general election held in January 1883. The legislature sat from May 17, 1883, to November 11, 1886.

Premier John Norquay formed a majority government. This is believed to be the first Manitoba provincial election where candidates ran for election purely on party lines.

Thomas Greenway was Leader of the Opposition.

Alexander Murray served as speaker for the assembly.

There were four sessions of the 5th Legislature:

Session	Start	End
1st	May 17, 1883	July 7, 1883
2nd	March 13, 1884	June 3, 1884
3rd	March 19, 1885	May 2, 1885
4th	March 4, 1886	May 28, 1886

James Cox Aikins was Lieutenant Governor of Manitoba.

== Members of the Assembly ==
The following members were elected to the assembly in 1883:

Member	Electoral district	Party	First elected / previously elected	No.# of term(s)
Alexander Murray	Assiniboia	Conservative	1874	4th term
Joseph Woodworth	Brandon	Conservative	1883	1st term
Edward Leacock	Birtle	Conservative	1882	2nd term
Edward Fairbanks	Baie St. Paul	Conservative	1883	1st term
Isaiah Mawhinney	Burnside	Conservative	1883	1st term
Joseph Lecomte	Cartier	Conservative	1883	1st term
John Andrew Davidson	Dauphin	Conservative	1881	2nd term
David H. Wilson	Dufferin North	Conservative	1881	2nd term
William Winram	Dufferin South	Liberal	1879	2nd term
Frederick Ernest Burnham	Emerson	Liberal	1883	1st term
Charles Douglas (1883)	Emerson	Conservative	1883	1st term
William Crawford	High Bluff and Poplar Point	Conservative	1883	1st term
Alexander Sutherland	Kildonan and St. Paul	Conservative	1878	3rd term
John MacBeth (1884)	Kildonan and St. Paul	Conservative	1884	1st term
Maxime Goulet	La Verendrye	Conservative	1878, (Note: St. Vital) 1883	2nd term*
Louis Prud'homme (1884)	La Verendrye	Conservative	1882, 1884	2nd term*
James Prendergast (1885)	La Verendrye	Conservative	1885	1st term
David Howard Harrison	Minnedosa	Conservative	1883	1st term
Henry Tennant	Morris	Conservative	1883	1st term
Thomas Greenway	Mountain	Liberal	1879	2nd term
Charles Hay	Norfolk	Liberal	1883	1st term
Joseph Martin	Portage la Prairie	Liberal	1883	1st term
Samuel Jacob Jackson	Rockwood	Liberal	1883	1st term
James Andrews Miller (Note: Election held September 21, 1883, because part of division was located in disputed territory; division dissolved in 1884 after Privy Council of Canada ruled against Manitoba's claim)	Rat Portage	Conservative	1883	1st term
John Norquay	St. Andrews	Conservative	1870	5th term
Alphonse Larivière	St. Boniface	Conservative	1878	3rd term
John Beresford Allan	St. Clements	Conservative	1883	1st term
Edward Gigot	St. Francois Xavier	Conservative	1883	1st term
Alexander Kittson	Ste. Agathe	Conservative	1879	2nd term
Joseph Cyr (1883)	Ste. Agathe	Liberal	1883	1st term
John Hedley Bell	Springfield	Liberal	1883	1st term
Finlay Young	Turtle Mountain	Liberal	1883	1st term
Corydon Partlow Brown	Westbourne	Conservative	1874	4th term
Elias George Conklin	Winnipeg North	Liberal	1883	1st term
Albert Clements Killam	Winnipeg South	Liberal	1883	1st term
Charles Edward Hamilton (1885)	Winnipeg South	Conservative	1885	1st term
William Wagner	Woodlands	Conservative	1883	1st term

== By-elections ==
By-elections were held to replace members for various reasons:

Electoral district	Member elected	Affiliation	Election date	Reason
Portage la Prairie	Joseph Martin	Liberal	May 26, 1883	J Martin unseated after election declared invalid
Ste. Agathe	Joseph Cyr	Liberal	June 15, 1883	A Kittson died
Emerson	Charles Douglas	Conservative	June 23, 1883	FE Burnham unseated after election declared invalid
La Verendrye	Louis Prud'homme	Conservative	January 15, 1884	M Goulet unseated after election declared invalid
Kildonan and St. Paul	John MacBeth	Conservative	April 8, 1884	A Sutherland died
Dufferin North	David H. Wilson	Conservative	May 13, 1884	DH Wilson ran for reelection upon appointment as Provincial Secretary
Winnipeg South	Charles Edward Hamilton	Conservative	February 24, 1885	AC Killam named to Supreme Court of Canada
La Verendrye	James Prendergast	Conservative	August 24, 1885	L Prud'homme named a county court judge
