= 1883 Manitoba general election =

Election

- January 23, 1883

30 16 seats needed for a majority
	First party	Second party
Leader	John Norquay	Thomas Greenway
Party	Ind. Conservative	Liberal
Leader since	October 16, 1878	1882
Leader's seat	St. Andrews	Mountain
Seats won	21	9
Popular vote	5,393	4,464
Percentage	54.71%	45.29%
Premier before election
John Norquay
Independent
Elected Premier
John Norquay
Ind. Conservative

The 1883 Manitoba general election was held on January 23, 1883, to elect 31 members to the Legislative Assembly of Manitoba. Incumbent premier John Norquay and his allies won re-election. This was the first partisan election in Manitoba, though the political parties were still unofficial. Norquay himself was officially independent, but he aligned with the Conservative Party, and his MLAs were considered to be the province's de facto Conservative Party. Norquay was opposed by the Liberals, led by Thomas Greenway, who had previously founded the Provincial Rights Party before merging with the Liberals.

== Background ==
One of the main issues in the election was the CPR monopoly of railways in Manitoba. Business leaders and farmers wanted increased competition to lower costs, but Canadian prime minister John A. Macdonald refused to allow competition with the CPR. Thomas Greenway and the Liberals blamed Norquay for this, arguing that as a political ally of the Conservative prime minister, Norquay agreed to the CPR monopoly in exchange for federal financial aid to the province. Norquay hoped to break the monopoly too, but was uncertain about whether constructing railways was legally in provincial jurisdiction, and was wary of ruining relations with the federal government.

== Results by riding ==
Electoral district	Candidates		Incumbent
Electoral district	Conservative	Liberal	Incumbent
Assiniboia	Alexander Murray 95 - 72.0%	James Cunningham 37 - 28%	Alexander Murray
Baie St. Paul	Edward Fairbanks Acclaimed		Marc Amable Girard
Birtle	Edward Leacock 251 - 50.9%	Robert Nelson 242 - 49.1%	Edward Leacock
Brandon	Joseph Woodworth 859 - 55.8%	John Sifton 681 - 44.2%	John Sifton
Burnside	Isaiah Mawhinney 185 - 60.0%	John Smith 124 - 40.0%	John Smith
Cartier	Joseph Lecomte 153 - 65.1% John Hargrave (Note: Two competing Conservative candidates contested this riding) 67 - 28.5%	J Parker 15 - 6.4%	Gilbert McMicken
Dauphin	John Davidson Acclaimed		John Davidson
Dufferin North	David Wilson 304 - 60.2%	H Landerkin 201 - 39.8%	David Wilson
Dufferin South	John Stewart 112 - 41.9%	William Winram 155 - 58.1%	William Winram
Emerson	R Chalmers 168 - 48.6%	Frederick Burnham 178 - 51.4%	Thomas Carney
High Bluff-Poplar Point	William Crawford 68 - 50.7%	H Rose 49.3%	John Drummond
Kildonan and St. Paul	Alexander Sutherland 100 - 57.1%	John Sutherland 75 - 42.9%	Alexander Sutherland
La Verendrye	Maxime Goulet 181 - 51.1% Louis Prud'homme (Note: Two competing Conservative candidates contested this riding) 173 - 48.9%		Louis Prud'homme
Minnedosa	David Harrison 495 - 53.6%	David Glass 428 - 46.4%	John Crerar
Morris West	Henry Tennant 204 - 42.9% G Wilde 134 - 28.2% (Note: Two competing Conservative candidates contested this riding)	Alphonse Martin 138 - 30.0%	Joseph Taillefer
Mountain	John Norquay 244 - 42.5%	Thomas Greenway 330 - 57.5%	Thomas Greenway
Norfolk	W Ross 37.1%	Charles Hay 62.9%	New riding
Portage la Prairie	W Black 304 - 49.0%	Joseph Martin 315 - 50.7% Edward Hay (Note: Two competing Liberal candidates contested this riding) 2 - 0.3%	James Cowan
Rockwood	James Miller 74 - 22.8%	Samuel Jackson 250 - 77.2%	John Aikins
Springfield	Charles Edie 162 - 48.9%	John Bell 169 - 51.1%	Charles Edie
St. Agathe	Alexander Kittson Acclaimed		Alexander Kittson
St. Andrews	John Norquay Acclaimed		John Norquay
St. Boniface	Alphonse Larivière 97 - 68.8%	Edouard Richard 44 - 31.2%	Alphonse Larivière
St. Clements	John Allan 94 - 54.7%	John Gunn 78 - 45.3%	Edward Hay
St. Francois Xavier	Edward Gigot 66.7%	Daniel Carey 36 - 33.3%	Patrice Breland
Turtle Mountain	James Alexander 145 - 38.5%	Findlay Young 232 - 61.5%	James Alexander
Westbourne	Corydon Brown Acclaimed		David Marr Walker
Winnipeg North	A Monkman 218 - 42.2%	Elias Conklin 299 - 57.8%	New riding
Winnipeg South	C Tuttle 196 - 43.1%	Albert Killam 259 - 56.9%	New riding
Woodlands	William Wagner 136 - 78.6% Francis Lipsett 37 - 21.4% (Note: Ran as a Liberal-Conservative)		Francis Lipsett
