= 4th Manitoba Legislature =

Legislature of Manitoba

The members of the 4th Manitoba Legislature were elected in the Manitoba general election held in December 1879. The legislature sat from January 22, 1880, to November 13, 1882.

Premier John Norquay formed a majority government. There appears to have been some debate at the time of this election whether or not candidates were running for election based on party lines.

Thomas Greenway was Leader of the Opposition.

John Wright Sifton served as speaker for the assembly.

There were four sessions of the 4th Legislature:

| Session | Start | End |
|---|---|---|
| 1st | January 22, 1880 | February 14, 1880 |
| 2nd | December 16, 1880 | December 23, 1880 |
| 3rd | March 3, 1881 | May 25, 1881 |
| 4th | April 22, 1882 | May 30, 1882 |

Joseph-Édouard Cauchon was Lieutenant Governor of Manitoba until September 29, 1882, when James Cox Aikins became lieutenant governor.

== Members of the Assembly ==
The following members were elected to the assembly in 1879:

| Member | Electoral district | Affiliation | First elected / previously elected | No.# of term(s) | Notes |
|---|---|---|---|---|---|
| Alexander Murray | Assiniboia | Liberal-Conservative | 1874 | 3rd term | |
| Marc Amable Girard | Baie St. Paul | Conservative | 1870, (Note: St. Boniface West) 1879 | 2nd term* | |
| Stephen Clement | Birtle | Liberal | 1881 | 1st term | |
| Edward Leacock (1882) | Birtle | Conservative | 1882 | 1st term | |
| John Wright Sifton | Brandon | Liberal | 1881 | 1st term | |
| John Smith | Burnside | Independent | 1879 | 1st term | |
| Gilbert McMicken | Cartier | Liberal-Conservative | 1879 | 1st term | |
| John Andrew Davidson | Dauphin | Liberal | 1881 | 1st term | |
| Andrew Laughlin | Dufferin North | Conservative | 1879 | 1st term | |
| David H. Wilson (1881) | Dufferin North | Conservative | 1881 | 1st term | |
| William Winram | Dufferin South | Liberal | 1879 | 1st term | |
| William Hill Nash | Emerson | Conservative | 1879 | 1st term | |
| Thomas Carney (1880) | Emerson | Conservative | 1880 | 1st term | |
| Corydon Partlow Brown | Gladstone | Liberal | 1874 | 3rd term | |
| John Drummond | High Bluff and Poplar Point | Conservative | 1878 | 2nd term | |
| Alexander Sutherland | Kildonan and St. Paul | Liberal-Conservative | 1878 | 2nd term | |
| Maxime Goulet | La Verendrye | Independent | 1878 | 2nd term | |
| Louis Arthur Prud'homme (1882) | La Verendrye | Conservative | 1882 | 1st term | |
| John Crerar | Minnedosa | Liberal | 1881 | 1st term | |
| Joseph Taillefer | Morris | Independent | 1878 | 2nd term | |
| Thomas Greenway | Mountain | Independent Conservative | 1879 | 1st term | |
| James Cowan | Portage la Prairie | Independent Liberal | 1874 | 3rd term | |
| John Aikins | Rockwood | Liberal-Conservative | 1879 | 1st term | |
| John Norquay | St. Andrews | Conservative | 1870 | 4th term | |
| Alphonse Larivière | St. Boniface | Liberal-Conservative | 1878 | 2nd term | |
| Edward Hay | St. Clements | Independent Liberal | 1870, (Note: St. Andrews South) 1879 | 2nd term* | |
| Patrice Breland | St. Francois Xavier | Conservative | 1879 | 1st term | |
| Alexander Kittson | Ste. Agathe | Liberal-Conservative | 1879 | 1st term | |
| Arthur Wellington Ross | Springfield | Liberal | 1878 | 2nd term | |
| Charles Edie (1882) | Springfield | Conservative | 1882 | 1st term | |
| James Peterkin Alexander | Turtle Mountain | Conservative | 1881 | 1st term | |
| David Marr Walker | Westbourne | Liberal-Conservative | 1878 | 2nd term | |
| Thomas Scott | Winnipeg | Conservative | 1878 | 2nd term | |
| Daniel H. MacMillan (1880) | Winnipeg | Liberal | 1880 | 1st term | |
| Francis Wesley Lipsett | Woodlands | Liberal-Conservative | 1879 | 1st term | |

== By-elections ==
By-elections were held to replace members for various reasons:

| Electoral district | Member elected | Affiliation | Election date | Reason |
|---|---|---|---|---|
| Emerson | Thomas Carney | Conservative | August 1880 | WH Nash named registrar |
| Winnipeg | Daniel H. MacMillan | Liberal | December 4, 1880 | T Scott elected to Canadian House of Commons |
| Dufferin North | David H. Wilson | Conservative | August 1, 1881 | A Laughlin named registrar |
| Birtle | Stephen Clement | Liberal | November 2, 1881 | new riding created when western boundary of Manitoba extended |
| Brandon | John Wright Sifton | Liberal | November 2, 1881 | new riding created when western boundary of Manitoba extended |
| Dauphin | John Andrew Davidson | Liberal | November 2, 1881 | new riding created when western boundary of Manitoba extended |
| Minnedosa | John Crerar | Liberal | November 2, 1881 | new riding created when western boundary of Manitoba extended |
| Turtle Mountain | James Peterkin Alexander | Conservative | November 2, 1881 | new riding created when western boundary of Manitoba extended |
| St. Boniface | Alphonse Larivière | Conservative | December 15, 1881 | A Larivière ran for reelection upon appointment as Provincial Secretary |
| La Verendrye | Maxime Goulet | Conservative | December 15, 1881 | M Goulet ran for reelection upon appointment as Minister of Agriculture |
| La Verendrye | Louis Arthur Prud'homme | Conservative | July 20, 1882 | M Goulet named registrar |
| Springfield | Charles Edie | Conservative | August 24, 1882 | AW Ross ran for federal seat |
| Birtle | Edward Leacock | Conservative | September 1, 1882 | S Clement named sheriff for the Western judicial district |
| Kildonan and St. Paul | Alexander Sutherland | Conservative | September 14, 1882 | A Sutherland ran for reelection upon appointment as Attorney-General |
