= Jean-Baptiste Lauzon =

Canadian politician (1858–1944)

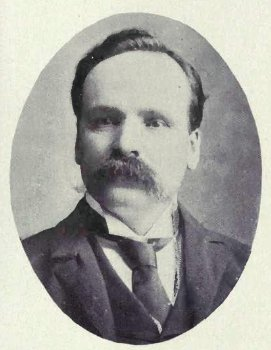

Member of the Legislative Assembly of Manitoba for St. Boniface
- In office 1896–1899

Member of the Legislative Assembly of Manitoba for La Vérendrye
- In office 1907–1910
- Preceded by: William Lagimodière
- Succeeded by: William Molloy
- In office 1914–1915
- Preceded by: William Molloy
- Succeeded by: Philippe Adjutor Talbot

Personal details
- Born: March 15, 1858 Pointe-Claire, Canada East
- Died: June 18, 1944 (aged 86) Winnipeg, Manitoba

Jean-Baptiste Lauzon (March 15, 1858 – June 18, 1944) was a politician in Manitoba, Canada. He served in the Legislative Assembly of Manitoba on three occasions: from 1897 to 1899, from 1907 to 1910, and from 1914 to 1915. Lauzon was a member of the Conservative Party.

Lauzon was born on March 15, 1858, in Pointe-Claire, Canada East (now Quebec). He was educated at Pointe Claire College, and moved to Manitoba to work as a cattle dealer. He first sought election to the Manitoba legislature in the 1896 provincial election and lost to Liberal candidate James Prendergast in the constituency of St. Boniface, 357 votes to 278.

Prendergast resigned shortly after the election, and Lauzon was elected to take his place in the legislature in a by-election held on February 7, 1897. He defeated Liberal candidate S.A.D. Bertrand by 388 votes to 208, and sat with the Conservative caucus on the opposition benches of the legislature.

The Conservatives won a majority government in the 1899 provincial election, though Lauzon lost his St. Boniface constituency to S.A.D. Bertrand by twenty-five votes. He attempted to return to the legislature in the 1903 campaign for the rural constituency of La Vérendrye, but lost to Liberal incumbent William Lagimodière by a margin of only eleven votes.

Lauzon was re-elected in the 1907 provincial election, defeating Lagimodière by twenty-three votes. He served as a backbench supporter of Rodmond Roblin's government for the next three years, and lost to Liberal candidate William Molloy by nine votes in the 1910 campaign.

Lauzon was elected to the legislature for a third time in the 1914 provincial election, defeating Liberal candidate Philippe Adjutor Talbot by 228 votes. He again served as a backbench supporter of Roblin's government.

In 1915, Roblin's administration was forced to resign after a commission established by the Lieutenant Governor found the government guilty of corruption in the tendering of legislative contracts. A new election was called, which the Liberals won in a landslide. Lauzon lost the La Vérendrye constituency to Talbot by 155 votes.
