= Steinbach City Council =

Governing body in Canada

Steinbach City Council is the governing body of the City of Steinbach, Manitoba, Canada.

The council consists of the mayor and six councillors.

== Council members ==
- Earl Funk - Mayor
- Susan Penner - Deputy Mayor
- Greg Carlos
- Ron Falk
- Bill Hiebert
- Jake Hiebert
- Damian Penner

== Mayoral history ==
The unincorporated village of Steinbach was governed by a Schulz (mayor) and Schultebott (council) from 1874 to 1947 when Steinbach was incorporated as a town (and later as a city). Steinbach's first schulz was Johan Reimer, while the longest-serving schulz was Johan G. Barkman, who served as schulz for 25 years. His grandson Leonard Barkman also later served as mayor. The following chart lists Steinbach's mayors since incorporation as a town in 1947.

Mayors of Steinbach
Name	Term
Earl Funk	2018-
Chris Goertzen	2006−2018
Les Magnusson	1996−2006
Wes Reimer	1992−1996
Ernie Friesen	1986−1992
Helmut Pankratz	1980−1986
Abe Penner	1970-1980
Leonard Barkman	1958-1970
Klaas Barkman	1947-1958

== See also ==
- Manitoba municipal elections, 2006
- Manitoba municipal elections, 2010
