= Henry Mullins =

Canadian politician

The Honourable Henry Alfred Mullins
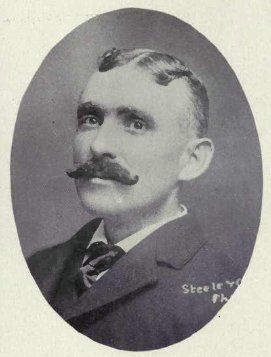

Member of the Legislative Assembly of Manitoba for Russell
- In office 1899–1903
- Preceded by: James Fisher
- Succeeded by: W. J. Doig

Member of Parliament for Marquette
- In office 1926–1930
- Preceded by: Thomas Crerar
- Succeeded by: James Allison Glen

Canadian Senator from Manitoba
- In office 1935–1950
- Appointed by: R. B. Bennett

Personal details
- Born: August 27, 1861 Oswestry, England
- Died: July 8, 1952 (aged 90)
- Party: Conservative
- Other political affiliations: Progressive Conservative Party of Manitoba
- Spouse: Annie M. Langrill (m. 1885)
- Children: 2

Henry Alfred Mullins (August 27, 1861 – July 8, 1952) was a Canadian politician.

== Early life and education ==
Born in Oswestry, England, the son of James and Margaret Mullins, Mullins was educated in Lindsay, Ontario, Canada.

== Political career ==
In 1899, he was elected as the Conservative candidate to the Legislative Assembly of Manitoba for the electoral district of Russell. During World War I, he was a Colonel, Inspector of Supplies and Transport. He was first elected to the House of Commons of Canada for the Manitoba electoral district of Marquette in the 1925 federal election. A Conservative, he was defeated in the 1926 federal election. He was elected again in the 1930 election. In 1935, he was summoned to the Senate of Canada for the senatorial division of Marquette, Manitoba on the advice of Prime Minister R. B. Bennett. He retired in 1950.

== Personal life ==
A Methodist, he married Annie M. Langrill in 1885. They had two daughters.
