= Stephen Clement =

Stephen Clement may refer to:

- Stephen Emmett Clement (1867–1947), politician in Manitoba, Canada
- Stephen Clement (Manitoba sheriff) (1831–1901), his father, political figure in Manitoba
- Stephen Merrell Clement (1859–1913), American banker, businessman and industrialist in Buffalo, New York
