= Minister of Culture, Heritage, Tourism and Sport (Manitoba) =

Provincial cabinet position in Manitoba, Canada

Minister of Sport, Culture, Heritage and Tourism
- Incumbent; Nellie Kennedy since November 13, 2024
- Manitoba Sport, Culture, Heritage and Tourism

The Minister of Sport, Culture, Heritage and Tourism (French: Ministre du Sport, de la Culture et du Patrimoine; formerly Minister of Culture, Heritage, Tourism and Sport) is the cabinet position in Manitoba that oversees the Department of Sport, Culture and Heritage. Since November 2024, the Minister has been Nellie Kennedy.

Manitoba Sport, Culture and Heritage—through developing, supporting, promoting, and celebrating the identity and well-being of the province and its communities—manages those government programs and services that support the sport, art, culture, and heritage of Manitoba.

The Minister and the Department are responsible for generating sustainable economic growth based on Manitoba's unique qualities and identity; increasing community capacity to improve well-being; enhancing public access to knowledge and information; encouraging, sharing, and making use of the province’s cultural and heritage resources; building Manitoba’s identity and reputation as a hub for artistic opportunity; and supporting Manitoba’s investments in amateur sport and encourage the hosting of regional, national, and international sport events.

== Legislation ==
Statutes that are the responsibility of the Minister of Sport, Culture and Heritage, include:

- The Manitoba Advisory Council on Citizenship, Immigration and Multiculturalism Act
- The Amusements Act (except Part II)
- The Archives and Recordkeeping Act
- The Arts Council Act
- The Centre culturel franco-manitobain Act
- The Coat of Arms, Emblems and the Manitoba Tartan Act
- The Combative Sports Act
- The Manitoba Film and Sound Recording Development Corporation Act
- The Foreign Cultural Objects Immunity from Seizure Act
- The Freedom of Information and Protection of Privacy Act
- The Heritage Manitoba Act
- The Heritage Resources Act
- The Income Tax Act (section 10.4)
- The Legislative Library Act
- The Manitoba Multiculturalism Act
- The Manitoba Museum Act
- The Public Libraries Act
- The Queen's Printer Act

== History ==
The precise ministerial designations related to sport, culture, and/or heritage in Manitoba have changed several times.

The ministerial position can be traced back to 1966, when Attorney-General Sterling Lyon was named as Minister of Tourism and Recreation. The newly-elected government of Edward Schreyer added a separate ministry of Cultural Affairs in 1969, but united the two ministries in 1971. In 1978, a minister in Sterling Lyon's government was given responsibility for Sport.

Responsibility for Tourism was transferred to the Economic Development portfolio in 1979, and was not reunited with Culture until 1999. Culture Ministers were also responsible for Citizenship from 1991 until 1999, when the responsibility was given to the Minister of Labour and Immigration.

=== Lists of ministers ===
Ministers of culture, heritage, and recreation
Name	Party	Took office	Left office
Minister of Tourism and Recreation
Sterling Lyon	PC	July 22, 1966	September 24, 1968
John Carroll	PC	September 24, 1968	July 15, 1969
Peter Burtniak	NDP	July 15, 1969	December 1, 1971
Minister of Cultural Affairs
Philip Petursson	NDP	July 17, 1969	November 4, 1970
Peter Burtniak	NDP	November 4, 1970	December 1, 1971
Minister of Tourism, Recreation and Cultural Affairs
Laurent Desjardins	NDP	December 1, 1971	January 28, 1974
Rene Toupin	NDP	January 28, 1974	September 22, 1976
Ben Hanuschak	NDP	September 22, 1976	October 24, 1977
Robert Banman	PC	October 24, 1977	October 20, 1978
Minister of Tourism and Cultural Affairs
Norma Price	PC	October 20, 1978	November 15, 1979
Minister of Cultural Affairs and Historical Resources
Norma Price	PC	November 15, 1979	November 30, 1981
Minister of Culture, Heritage and Recreation
Eugene Kostyra	NDP	November 30, 1981	April 17, 1986
Judy Wasylycia-Leis	NDP	April 17, 1986	May 9, 1988
Bonnie Mitchelson	PC	May 9, 1988	February 5, 1991
Minister of Culture, Heritage and Citizenship
Bonnie Mitchelson	PC	February 5, 1991	September 10, 1993
Harold Gilleshammer	PC	September 10, 1993	January 6, 1997
Rosemary Vodrey	PC	January 6, 1997	October 5, 1999
Minister of Culture, Heritage and Tourism
Diane McGifford	NDP	October 5, 1999	January 17, 2001
Ron Lemieux	NDP	January 17, 2001	September 25, 2002
Eric Robinson	NDP	September 25, 2002	September 12, 2007
Flor Marcelino	NDP	November 3, 2009	October 18, 2013

Ministers of Sport
Name	Party	Took office	Left office
Minister of Fitness, Recreation and Sport
Robert Banman	PC	October 20, 1978	November 30, 1981
Minister responsible for Recreation and Sport
Laurent Desjardins	NDP	November 30, 1981	November 4, 1983
Minister responsible for Sport, the Fitness and Amateur Sport Act and the Boxing and Wrestling Commission Act
Laurent Desjardins	NDP	November 4, 1983	February 10, 1988
James Ernst	PC	May 9, 1988	February 5, 1991
Eric Stefanson	PC	February 5, 1991	September 10, 1993
James Ernst	PC	September 10, 1993	January 6, 1997
Minister responsible for Fitness and Amateur Sport and the Boxing Commission Act
Eric Stefanson	PC	January 6, 1997	October 5, 1999
Minister responsible for Sport
David Chomiak	NDP	October 5, 1999	January 17, 2001
Ron Lemieux	NDP	January 17, 2001	September 25, 2002
Eric Robinson	NDP	September 25, 2002	September 12, 2007
Eric Robinson	NDP	November 3, 2009	October 18, 2013

Ministers of Culture, Heritage, and Sport
Name	Party	Took office	Left office
Minister of Culture, Heritage, Tourism and Sport
Eric Robinson	NDP	September 12, 2007	November 3, 2009
Minister of Tourism, Culture, Heritage, Sport and Consumer Protection
Ron Lemieux	NDP	October 18, 2013	May 3, 2016
Minister of Sport, Culture and Heritage
Rochelle Squires	PC	May 3, 2016	August 17, 2017
Cathy Cox	PC	August 17, 2017	January 18, 2022
Andrew Smith	PC	January 18, 2022	January 30, 2023
Obby Khan	PC	January 30, 2023	October 18, 2023
Minister of Sport, Culture, Heritage and Tourism
Glen Simard	NDP	October 18, 2023	November 13, 2024
Nellie Kennedy	NDP	November 13, 2024	incumbent

== See also ==
- Minister of Canadian Heritage
- Minister for Sport (Canada)
- Minister responsible for the Status of Women (Manitoba)
