= Pankratz (surname) =

Pankratz is a surname. Notable people with the surname include:

- David Pankratz, Canadian politician
- Helmut Pankratz (born 1937), Canadian politician
- Loren Pankratz (born 1940), American psychiatrist, mentalist, magician, author and skeptic
- Marcia Pankratz (born 1964), American field hockey player
