= Philippe Adjutor Talbot =

Canadian politician (1879–1967)

14th Speaker of the Legislative Assembly of Manitoba
- In office January 18, 1923 – June 12, 1936
- Preceded by: James Bryson Baird
- Succeeded by: Robert Hawkins

Member of the Legislative Assembly of Manitoba for La Verendrye
- In office August 6, 1915 – July 27, 1936
- Preceded by: Jean-Baptiste Lauzon
- Succeeded by: Sauveur Marcoux

Personal details
- Born: November 11, 1879 St. Pierre du Sud, Quebec
- Died: March 8, 1967 (aged 87) Winnipeg, Manitoba
- Party: Progressive / Liberal-Progressive
- Occupation: telegraph operator, businessman

Philippe Adjutor Talbot (November 11, 1879 – March 8, 1967) was a politician in Manitoba, Canada. He served in the Legislative Assembly of Manitoba from 1915 to 1936, and was Speaker of the Assembly from 1923 to 1936. His name sometimes appears as Peter Talbot.

Talbot was born at St. Pierre du Sud, in the county of Montmagny, Québec, the son of Elzear Talbot and Delina Bacon, and was educated at St. Ferdinand d'Halifax College. Talbot first worked as a telegraph operator and was employed with the Canadian National Railway until 1906. He was a broker and a director of Canadian Agencies Limited and Northern Supply Co., Ltd. Talbot was a business partner of Aimé Bénard. In 1913, he married Charlotte Duguet.

He first ran for the Manitoba legislature in the 1914 provincial election, as a candidate of the Manitoba Liberal Party in La Verendrye. He lost to Conservative Jean-Baptiste Lauzon by 228 votes. He ran again in the 1915 election, and defeated Lauzon by 155 votes amid a provincial Liberal landslide.

Talbot initially served as a backbench supporter of Tobias Norris's ministry, but later left the party to become an independent member over the Manitoba Schools question. He was re-elected as an independent in the 1920 provincial election, defeating Farmer candidate L.R. Magnum by 314 votes. He became affiliated with the United Farmers of Manitoba (UFM) after this election, and was re-elected under the UFM banner in the 1922 provincial election. The UFM unexpectedly won a majority of seats, and formed government as the Progressive Party. Talbot was named as Speaker of the Legislature when it met on January 18, 1923, and continued in this office for the next thirteen years.

Talbot was re-elected without difficulty in the 1927 provincial election. In 1932, the Progressive Party formed an electoral alliance with the Liberal Party, and government members became known as "Liberal-Progressives". Talbot was narrowly returned in the 1932 campaign, defeating Conservative R.J.E. Arpin by only 76 votes. He did not seek re-election in 1936.

From 1937 to 1948, he served as clerk of the Executive Council.
