= Albert Vielfaure =

Canadian politician

Member of the Legislative Assembly of Manitoba for La Verendrye
- In office December 14, 1962 – June 25, 1969
- Preceded by: Stan Roberts
- Succeeded by: Leonard Barkman

Personal details
- Born: April 6, 1923; La Broquerie, Manitoba, Canada
- Died: December 12, 2007 (aged 84)
- Children: 5
- Occupation: Farmer, bulk oil salesman, politician

Albert Vielfaure (April 6, 1923 – December 12, 2007) was a politician in Manitoba, Canada. He was a Liberal member of the Legislative Assembly of Manitoba from 1962 to 1969.

Vielfaure was born and educated at La Broquerie (completing Grade 11), and worked as a farmer and bulk oil salesman. In 1951, he married Solange Desrosiers. Vielfaure served as a member of the Chamber of Commerce. He also was active in the Knights of Columbus.

He was first elected to the Manitoba legislature in the 1962 provincial election, defeating Progressive Conservative Rene Préfontaine by 308 votes in the rural francophone riding of La Vérendrye. He was re-elected by a much greater margin in the 1966 election. The Liberals were in opposition during this period, and Vielfaure spent his entire legislative career on the opposition benches. He did not run for re-election in 1969, after his riding was significantly changed by redistribution.

Vielfaure returned to his farm after leaving politics, focusing on hog and corn production. He served on the Manitoba Hog Marketing Commission from 1970 to 1975, and was an advisor to the federal Minister of Agriculture from 1970 to 1979. From 1986 to 1990, he was an adviser for farm programming on the Canadian Broadcasting Corporation's French network. He served with the Fédération des Caisses Populaires du Manitoba from 1971 to 1982, and received the "Prix Riel" in 2000 for his lifetime achievements in the francophone community. He retired from active farming in 1999, and has been recognized as a member of the Manitoba Agricultural Hall of Fame.

On the night of December 11, 2007, after a deteriorating condition, Vielfaure suffered a serious heart attack which slowed his breathing down and caused him to die in the early morning.
