= Ben Sveinson =

Canadian politician

Ben Sveinson (born August 4, 1945) is a former politician in Manitoba, Canada. He served as a member of the Manitoba legislature from 1990 to 1999 as a Progressive Conservative.

The son of August Sveinson and Mary Gibson, he was born in Spearhill, Manitoba. He attended secondary school in Moosehorn, and did not attend university. He subsequently worked as a federal meat inspector, and operated businesses in towing, security and TV antenna installation. In 1967, Sveinson married Millie Prokopich.

Sveinson was elected as a school trustee in Seine River in 1986, and re-elected in 1989. He was elected to the Manitoba legislature in the general election of 1990, beating his nearest opponent by about 1,000 votes in the rural southeastern riding of La Verendrye.

Sveinson was re-elected in 1995 by about 2,000 votes over his nearest opponent. He was never appointed to Premier Gary Filmon's cabinet, though he did serve as Deputy Chair of Committees for a time.

The Progressive Conservatives, who had governed the province since 1988, were defeated by the New Democratic Party in the 1999 provincial election. Sveinson was upset in La Verendrye, losing to NDP candidate Ron Lemieux by 166 votes. Sveinson did not seek to return to office in 2003.

Following his defeat, Sveinson joined the real estate firm Century 21. He also joined the federal Progressive Conservative riding association executive in the riding of Provencher. In 2003, he led the executive in a unanimous vote against a political merger with the Canadian Alliance, and declared his support for Joe Clark's (ultimately unsuccessful) attempts to prevent the merger.
