= Alfred Doig =

Canadian politician

Representative for Cypress in the Legislative Assembly of Manitoba
- In office 1892–1899

Personal details
- Born: March 15, 1855 Toronto, Canada West
- Died: May 2, 1939 (aged 84) Glenboro, Manitoba, Canada
- Party: Liberal
- Spouse: Adelaide Wilcox (m. 1877)
- Parents: Andrew Doig (father); Ann Spaulding (mother)
- Occupation: merchant, politician

Alfred Doig (March 15, 1855 – May 2, 1939) was a merchant and political figure in Manitoba. He represented Cypress from 1892 to 1899 in the Legislative Assembly of Manitoba as a Liberal.

== Life ==
He was born in Toronto, Canada West, the son of Andrew Doig and Ann Spaulding, both natives of Scotland. Doig was educated in Owen Sound. He then apprenticed as a copper and tin smith, completing his apprenticeship in Walkerton. Doig worked at this trade in Meaford and then Bolton. He married Adelaide Wilcox in 1877. In 1890, he left Ontario for Manitoba, settling in Glenboro. There, Doig purchased a tin business, which he expanded to include wholesale and retail hardware sales. He was defeated when he ran for reelection to the Manitoba assembly in 1899.

Doig was named an honorary life member of the Manitoba Curling Association in 1922. He died in Glenboro at the age of 84.

His brother William also served in the Manitoba assembly.
