= William Molloy (Manitoba politician) =

Canadian politician

William Molloy (October 28, 1877 – April 10, 1917) was a politician in Manitoba, Canada. He served in the Legislative Assembly of Manitoba from 1910 to 1914 as a member of the Liberal Party.

He was born in Arthur, Ontario, the son of John Molloy and Mary Alice Daly, came to Manitoba with his family in 1879 and was educated at the University of Minnesota. At first, Molloy taught school in Manitoba; he later was employed as a land surveyor.

Molloy was elected to the Manitoba legislature in the 1910 provincial election, defeating Conservative incumbent Jean-Baptiste Lauzon by seven votes in the rural constituency of La Verendrye. The Conservatives won the election, and Molloy served in the legislature as a member of the opposition. He was defeated in the 1914 election, losing to Conservative Jacques Parent by 262 votes in the Morris constituency.

Molloy attempted to return to the legislature in the 1915 election, but lost to Parent by 57 votes.

His brother John was a member of the Canadian House of Commons and his brother Thomas served in the Manitoba assembly.

Molloy served in the Canadian Expeditionary Force as a lieutenant during World War I. He died while serving overseas with the 1st Canadian Mounted Rifles (Saskatchewan) and was buried in France.
