= Russell (Manitoba electoral district) =

Defunct provincial electoral district in Manitoba, Canada

Coordinates: 50.645°N 100.327°W

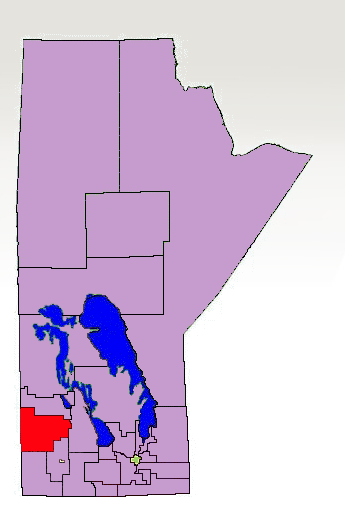
The 1998–2011 boundaries for Russell highlighted in red

Russell was a provincial electoral district of Manitoba, Canada. It was located in the southwestern section of the province.

== Historical riding ==
The original Russell riding was created in 1886, shortly after the expansion of Manitoba's western boundaries. It existed until 1957, when it was combined with the riding of Birtle as Birtle-Russell. The riding was primarily agrarian, and elected candidates from various parties who supported agrarian interests.

== Members of the Legislative Assembly (1886–1958) ==
Name	Party	Took office	Left office
Edward Leacock	Cons	1886	1888
James Fisher	Lib	1888	1889(?)
	Independent/Opposition	1889(?)	1896
	Cons	1896	1899
Henry Mullins	Cons	1899	1903
W.J. Doig	Lib	1903	1907
Angus Bonnycastle	Cons	1907	1914
Donald C. McDonald	Lib	1914	1915
William Wilson	Lib	1915	1922
Isaac Griffiths	Prog	1922	1932
	Lib-Prog	1932	1941
William Wilson	Lib-Prog	1941	1949
Rodney Clement	Independent Lib-Prog	1949	1954(?)
	Lib-Prog	1954(?)	1958

== Modern riding ==
The riding of Birtle-Russell lasted from 1957 to 1979, and the subsequent riding of Roblin-Russell from 1979 to 1999. In 1999, the Roblin section of the riding was joined with Dauphin as Dauphin—Roblin, and a separate Russell riding was re-established. The riding was dissolved again in 2011.

The modern riding was bordered to the north by Dauphin—Roblin, to the east by Ste. Rose, to the south by Minnedosa and Arthur-Virden, and to the west by the province of Saskatchewan. The town of Russell was the main urban centre in this riding, which also included Birtle, Inglis, Angusville, Rossburn, Erickson, Oakburn, Shoal Lake, and Hamiota. The Riding Mountain National Park and Asessippi Provincial Park were also located in Russell.

The riding's population in 1996 was 18,647. In 1999, the average family income was $39,999, and the unemployment rate was 6.10%. Russell remained primarily an agrarian riding, with agriculture accounting for 32% of its industry. Fourteen per cent of the riding's residents were aboriginal, and a further 13% were Ukrainian. The riding also had the second-highest percentage of senior citizens in Manitoba, at 21% of the total.

The last MLA was Len Derkach of the Progressive Conservative Party, who held the riding of Roblin-Russell from 1986 to 1999. The New Democratic Party made serious inroads in the riding before its dissolution.

Following the 2008 electoral redistribution, the riding was renamed Riding Mountain and expanded to include parts of the riding of Minnedosa. This change took effect for the 2011 election.

== Members of the Legislative Assembly (1999–2011) ==
Name	Party	Took office	Left office
Len Derkach	PC	1999	2011

== Electoral results ==
=== 1886 ===
1886 Manitoba general election
Party	Candidate	Votes	%
Conservative	Edward Leacock	228	50.89
Liberal	James Fisher	220	49.11
Total valid votes		448	–
Rejected		N/A	–
Eligible voters / Turnout		697	64.28
Source(s) Source: Manitoba. Chief Electoral Officer (1999). Statement of Votes for the 37th Provincial General Election, September 21, 1999 (PDF) (Report). Winnipeg: Elections Manitoba.

=== 1888 ===
1888 Manitoba general election
Party	Candidate	Votes	%	±%
Liberal	James Fisher	346	79.18	30.07
Independent	John Butternut Fraser	91	20.82	–
Total valid votes		437	–	–
Rejected		N/A	–	
Eligible voters / Turnout		N/A	–	–
Source(s) Source: Manitoba. Chief Electoral Officer (1999). Statement of Votes for the 37th Provincial General Election, September 21, 1999 (PDF) (Report). Winnipeg: Elections Manitoba.

=== 1892 ===
1892 Manitoba general election
Party	Candidate	Votes	%	±%
Independent	James Fisher		0.00	–
Total valid votes			–	–
Rejected		N/A	–	
Eligible voters / Turnout		730	0.00	–
Source(s) Source: Manitoba. Chief Electoral Officer (1999). Statement of Votes for the 37th Provincial General Election, September 21, 1999 (PDF) (Report). Winnipeg: Elections Manitoba.

=== 1896 ===
1896 Manitoba general election
Party	Candidate	Votes	%	±%
Independent	James Fisher	337	51.69	–
Liberal	Thomas Almack	315	48.31	–
Total valid votes		652	–	–
Rejected		N/A	–	
Eligible voters / Turnout		806	80.89	80.89
Source(s) Source: Manitoba. Chief Electoral Officer (1999). Statement of Votes for the 37th Provincial General Election, September 21, 1999 (PDF) (Report). Winnipeg: Elections Manitoba.

=== 1899 ===
1899 Manitoba general election
Party	Candidate	Votes	%	±%
Conservative	Henry Mullins	466	51.95	–
Liberal	William S. Crerar	431	48.05	-0.26
Total valid votes		897	–	–
Rejected		N/A	–	
Eligible voters / Turnout		1,211	74.07	-6.82
Source(s) Source: Manitoba. Chief Electoral Officer (1999). Statement of Votes for the 37th Provincial General Election, September 21, 1999 (PDF) (Report). Winnipeg: Elections Manitoba.

=== 1903 ===
1903 Manitoba general election
Party	Candidate	Votes	%	±%
Liberal	William Doig	475	57.51	9.46
Conservative	Angus Bonnycastle	351	42.49	-9.46
Total valid votes		826	–	–
Rejected		N/A	–	
Eligible voters / Turnout		946	87.32	13.24
Source(s) Source: Manitoba. Chief Electoral Officer (1999). Statement of Votes for the 37th Provincial General Election, September 21, 1999 (PDF) (Report). Winnipeg: Elections Manitoba.

=== 1907 ===
1907 Manitoba general election
Party	Candidate	Votes	%	±%
Conservative	Angus Bonnycastle	605	50.37	7.88
Liberal	Dr. Thomas Alexander Wright	596	49.63	-7.88
Total valid votes		1,201	–	–
Rejected		N/A	–	
Eligible voters / Turnout		1,589	75.58	-11.73
Source(s) Source: Manitoba. Chief Electoral Officer (1999). Statement of Votes for the 37th Provincial General Election, September 21, 1999 (PDF) (Report). Winnipeg: Elections Manitoba.

=== 1910 ===
1910 Manitoba general election
Party	Candidate	Votes	%	±%
Conservative	Angus Bonnycastle	900	50.22	-0.15
Liberal	William Valens	892	49.78	0.15
Total valid votes		1,792	–	–
Rejected		N/A	–	
Eligible voters / Turnout		2,181	82.16	6.58
Source(s) Source: Manitoba. Chief Electoral Officer (1999). Statement of Votes for the 37th Provincial General Election, September 21, 1999 (PDF) (Report). Winnipeg: Elections Manitoba.

=== 1911 by-election ===
Manitoba provincial by-election, February 4, 1911
Party	Candidate	Votes	%	±%
Conservative	Frederic Newton	916	58.46	8.23
Liberal	William Valens	651	41.54	-8.23
Total valid votes		1,567	–	–
Rejected		N/A	–	
Eligible voters / Turnout		N/A	–	–
Source(s) Source: Manitoba. Chief Electoral Officer (1999). Statement of Votes for the 37th Provincial General Election, September 21, 1999 (PDF) (Report). Winnipeg: Elections Manitoba.

=== 1914 ===
1914 Manitoba general election
Party	Candidate	Votes	%	±%
Liberal	Donald Cromwell McDonald	892	50.86	9.31
Conservative	Edward Graham	862	49.14	-9.31
Total valid votes		1,754	–	–
Rejected		N/A	–	
Eligible voters / Turnout		2,140	81.96	–
Source(s) Source: Manitoba. Chief Electoral Officer (1999). Statement of Votes for the 37th Provincial General Election, September 21, 1999 (PDF) (Report). Winnipeg: Elections Manitoba.

=== 1915 ===
1915 Manitoba general election
Party	Candidate	Votes	%	±%
Liberal	William Wilber Wilfred Wilson	1,033	62.72	11.86
Conservative	James Powell Laycock	614	37.28	-11.86
Total valid votes		1,647	–	–
Rejected		N/A	–	
Eligible voters / Turnout		2,234	73.72	-8.24
Source(s) Source: Manitoba. Chief Electoral Officer (1999). Statement of Votes for the 37th Provincial General Election, September 21, 1999 (PDF) (Report). Winnipeg: Elections Manitoba.

=== 1920 ===
1920 Manitoba general election
Party	Candidate	Votes	%	±%
Liberal	William Wilber Wilfred Wilson	1,274	50.78	-11.94
Farmer	R. J. Brown	642	25.59	–
Independent	Albert G. Lanigan	593	23.63	–
Total valid votes		2,509	–	–
Rejected		N/A	–	
Eligible voters / Turnout		3,884	64.60	-9.13
Source(s) Source: Manitoba. Chief Electoral Officer (1999). Statement of Votes for the 37th Provincial General Election, September 21, 1999 (PDF) (Report). Winnipeg: Elections Manitoba.

=== 1922 ===
1922 Manitoba general election
Party	Candidate	Votes	%	±%
United Farmers	Isaac Griffiths	1,177	43.58	–
Liberal	William Wilber Wilfred Wilson	783	28.99	-21.79
Conservative	Edgar Carnegy de Galinhard	741	27.43	–
Total valid votes		2,701	–	–
Rejected		N/A	–	
Eligible voters / Turnout		4,018	67.22	2.62
Source(s) Source: Manitoba. Chief Electoral Officer (1999). Statement of Votes for the 37th Provincial General Election, September 21, 1999 (PDF) (Report). Winnipeg: Elections Manitoba.

=== 1927 ===
1927 Manitoba general election
Party	Candidate	Votes	%	±%
Progressive	Isaac Griffiths	1,431	36.43	–
Conservative	Robert Peden	1,311	33.38	5.94
Liberal	William Wilber Wilfred Wilson	932	23.73	-5.26
Independent	Basil Lazaruk	254	6.47	–
Total valid votes		3,928	–	–
Rejected		N/A	–	
Eligible voters / Turnout		5,042	77.91	10.68
Source(s) Source: Manitoba. Chief Electoral Officer (1999). Statement of Votes for the 37th Provincial General Election, September 21, 1999 (PDF) (Report). Winnipeg: Elections Manitoba.

=== 1932 ===
1932 Manitoba general election
Party	Candidate	Votes	%	±%
Liberal–Progressive	Isaac Griffiths	2,523	67.10	–
Conservative	Ernest Harold Whelpley	1,237	32.90	-0.48
Total valid votes		3,760	–	–
Rejected		N/A	–	
Eligible voters / Turnout		5,667	66.35	-11.56
Source(s) Source: Manitoba. Chief Electoral Officer (1999). Statement of Votes for the 37th Provincial General Election, September 21, 1999 (PDF) (Report). Winnipeg: Elections Manitoba.

=== 1935 by-election ===
Manitoba provincial by-election, June 24, 1935
Party	Candidate	Votes	%	±%
Liberal–Progressive	Isaac Griffiths	acclaimed	–	–
Total valid votes			–	–
Rejected		N/A	–	
Eligible voters / Turnout		N/A	–	–
Source(s) Source: Manitoba. Chief Electoral Officer (1999). Statement of Votes for the 37th Provincial General Election, September 21, 1999 (PDF) (Report). Winnipeg: Elections Manitoba.

=== 1936 ===
1936 Manitoba general election
Party	Candidate	Votes	%	±%
Liberal–Progressive	Isaac Griffiths	1,827	53.14	–
Independent Labour	H. J. Peddie	1,611	46.86	–
Total valid votes		3,438	–	–
Rejected		44	–	
Eligible voters / Turnout		6,524	53.37	–
Source(s) Source: Manitoba. Chief Electoral Officer (1999). Statement of Votes for the 37th Provincial General Election, September 21, 1999 (PDF) (Report). Winnipeg: Elections Manitoba.

=== 1941 ===
1941 Manitoba general election
Party	Candidate	Votes	%	±%
Liberal–Progressive	William Wilber Wilfred Wilson	1,907	50.32	-2.82
Co-operative Commonwealth	H. J. Peddie	1,883	49.68	–
Total valid votes		3,790	–	–
Rejected		16	–	
Eligible voters / Turnout		6,369	59.76	6.39
Source(s) Source: Manitoba. Chief Electoral Officer (1999). Statement of Votes for the 37th Provincial General Election, September 21, 1999 (PDF) (Report). Winnipeg: Elections Manitoba.

=== 1945 ===
1945 Manitoba general election
Party	Candidate	Votes	%	±%
Liberal–Progressive	William Wilber Wilfred Wilson	2,250	56.00	5.68
Co-operative Commonwealth	Michael John Tokar	1,768	44.00	-5.68
Total valid votes		4,018	–	–
Rejected		61	–	
Eligible voters / Turnout		5,991	68.09	8.33
Source(s) Source: Manitoba. Chief Electoral Officer (1999). Statement of Votes for the 37th Provincial General Election, September 21, 1999 (PDF) (Report). Winnipeg: Elections Manitoba.

=== 1949 ===
1949 Manitoba general election
Party	Candidate	Votes	%	±%
Independent	Rod Clement	2,207	62.12	–
Independent	Michael John Tokar	1,346	37.88	–
Total valid votes		3,553	–	–
Rejected		29	–	
Eligible voters / Turnout		5,227	68.53	0.44
Source(s) Source: Manitoba. Chief Electoral Officer (1999). Statement of Votes for the 37th Provincial General Election, September 21, 1999 (PDF) (Report). Winnipeg: Elections Manitoba.

=== 1953 ===
1953 Manitoba general election
Party	Candidate	Votes	%	±%
Independent Liberal	Rod Clement	2,033	46.70	–
Co-operative Commonwealth	Michael John Sotas	1,322	30.37	–
Progressive Conservative	Keith Porter	846	19.43	–
Social Credit	Charles Russell Beswatherick	152	3.49	–
Total valid votes		4,353	–	–
Rejected		56	–	
Eligible voters / Turnout		5,206	84.69	16.16
Source(s) Source: Manitoba. Chief Electoral Officer (1999). Statement of Votes for the 37th Provincial General Election, September 21, 1999 (PDF) (Report). Winnipeg: Elections Manitoba.

=== 1999 ===
1999 Manitoba general election
Party	Candidate	Votes	%	±%	Expenditures
Progressive Conservative	Len Derkach	4,397	53.63	34.19	$25,226.25
New Democratic	Vince Lelond	3,802	46.37	–	$20,154.00
Total valid votes		8,199	–	–	
Rejected		137	–		
Eligible voters / turnout		12,785	65.20	-19.49	
Source(s) Source: Manitoba. Chief Electoral Officer (1999). Statement of Votes for the 37th Provincial General Election, September 21, 1999 (PDF) (Report). Winnipeg: Elections Manitoba.

=== 2003 ===
2003 Manitoba general election
Party	Candidate	Votes	%	±%	Expenditures
Progressive Conservative	Len Derkach	4,087	51.96	-1.67	$27,389.37
New Democratic	Don Yanick	3,208	40.78	-5.59	$16,433.91
Liberal	Joan Clement	571	7.26	–	$5,109.83
Total valid votes		7,866	–	–	
Rejected		42	–		
Eligible voters / Turnout		12,484	63.35	-1.86	
Source(s) Source: Manitoba. Chief Electoral Officer (2003). Statement of Votes for the 38th Provincial General Election, June 3, 2003 (PDF) (Report). Winnipeg: Elections Manitoba.

=== 2007 ===
2007 Manitoba general election
Party	Candidate	Votes	%	±%	Expenditures
Progressive Conservative	Len Derkach	4,141	58.49	6.53	$24,191.42
New Democratic	Teri Nicholson	2,375	33.55	-7.24	$16,949.28
Liberal	Clarice Wilson	564	7.97	0.71	$10.92
Total valid votes		7,080	–	–	
Rejected		21	–		
Eligible voters / turnout		11,652	60.94	-2.40	
Source(s) Source: Manitoba. Chief Electoral Officer (2007). Statement of Votes for the 39th Provincial General Election, May 22, 2007 (PDF) (Report). Winnipeg: Elections Manitoba.

== See also ==
- List of Manitoba provincial electoral districts
- Canadian provincial electoral districts
