= James Allison Glen =

Canadian politician (1877–1950)

The Hon. James Allison Glen P.C.
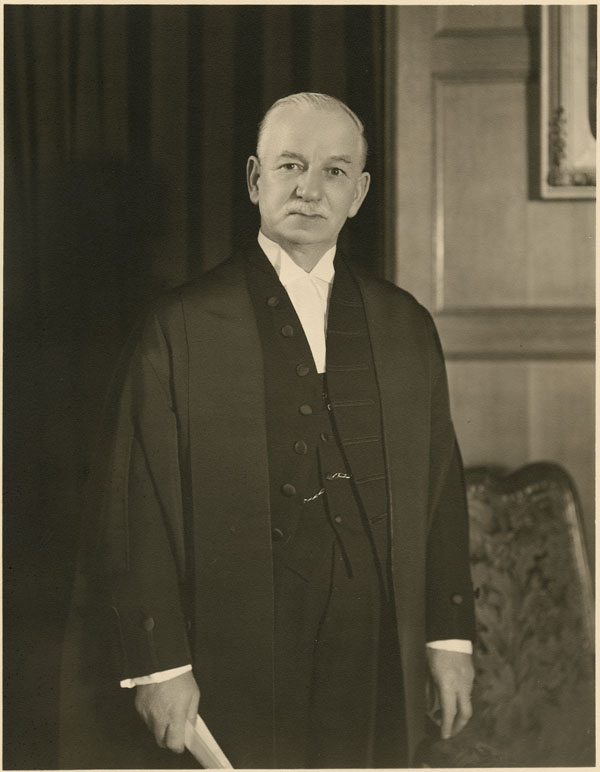

20th Speaker of the House of Commons of Canada
- In office 16 May 1940 – 5 September 1945
- Preceded by: Pierre-François Casgrain
- Succeeded by: Gaspard Fauteux

Member of the Canadian Parliament for Marquette
- In office 1926–1930
- Preceded by: Henry Mullins
- Succeeded by: Henry Mullins
- In office 1935–1948
- Preceded by: Henry Mullins
- Succeeded by: Stuart Garson

Personal details
- Born: 18 December 1877 Renton, Scotland
- Died: 28 June 1950 (aged 72) Ottawa, Ontario, Canada
- Party: Liberal Progressive (1926–1945); Liberal Party of Canada (1945–1948)
- Cabinet: Minister of Mines and Resources (1945–1948)
- Portfolio: Speaker of the House of Commons (1940–1945)

James Allison Glen, PC (18 December 1877 – 28 June 1950) was a Canadian parliamentarian and Speaker of the House of Commons of Canada from 1940 to 1945.

== Early life ==
Born in Renton, Scotland, Glen graduated in law from the University of Glasgow before immigrating to Canada in 1911 where he settled in Winnipeg. He later moved to Russell, Manitoba, where he practised law and was elected to the school board.

== Politics ==
A supporter of the Progressive Party in Manitoba, Glen had been the chief organizer for party leader Thomas Crerar in the 1917 federal election when Crerar was a Liberal-Unionist candidate, and the 1921 election in which the Progressives made their debut.

Glen was first elected to the House of Commons of Canada in the 1926 election as a Liberal-Progressive at a time when Manitoba Progressives, including the Manitoba Progressive Party provincial government, had decided to align with the Liberals in order to increase their influence. He lost his seat in the 1930 election but was re-elected to Parliament in the federal election of 1935.

Glen was chosen as Speaker of the House following the 1940 election, and had to deal with issues of wartime security such as censoring Hansard in order to remove sensitive military information. Due to the international situation and wartime mobilization, there was a greater degree of interparty cooperation during the war which assisted Glen in his role as Speaker.

Glen remained a Liberal-Progressive in name until the 1945 election when he ran as a Liberal—immediately prior to the 1945 election, Mackenzie King appointed Glen to the Canadian Cabinet as Minister of Mines and Resources. In practice, however, he and his fellow Liberal-Progressives were Liberals in every respect.

Glen remained Minister of Mines and Resources until he retired from Cabinet following a heart attack in 1948. A few months later Glen resigned from the House of Commons in order to provide a seat for Stuart Garson, the Premier of Manitoba who had been enticed to join the federal Cabinet as Minister of Justice. Glen was appointed Canadian Co-Chairman of the International Joint Commission. He died two years later.
