= William Wilber Wilfred Wilson =

Canadian politician (1885–1964)

William Wilber Wilfred Wilson (October 6, 1885 in Birtle, Manitoba – January 27, 1964) was a politician in Manitoba, Canada. He served in the Legislative Assembly of Manitoba from 1915 to 1922, and again from 1941 to 1949.

The son of Edmund James Wilson and Mary Ann Dunsmore, Wilson was educated at Manitoba's Wesley College, and worked as an attorney-at-law. In 1909, he married Bertha Cairns. He was the mayor of Russell, Manitoba from 1915 to 1918, concurrent with his early tenure in the legislature.

Wilson was first elected to the Manitoba legislature in the provincial election of 1915. Running for the Liberal Party, he easily defeated Conservative candidate J.P. Laycock in the constituency of Russell.

Wilson was re-elected without difficulty in the 1920 election. During these years, he was a backbench supporter of Premier Tobias Norris's government.

The Liberals were defeated in the 1922 provincial election, and Wilson lost his seat to Isaac Griffiths of the United Farmers of Manitoba. He sought re-election in 1927, but was again defeated.

Wilson served as chair of the Russell School Board from 1935 to 1942.

He was re-elected to the Manitoba legislature in the 1941 provincial election, following a nineteen-year absence. Previously, the United Farmers of Manitoba had evolved into the Progressive Party, and had merged with the Liberals to create the "Liberal-Progressive Party". Wilson ran as a Liberal-Progressive, and defeated Cooperative Commonwealth Federation candidate H.J. Peddies by 14 votes in Russell. He again served as a government backbencher, supporting the administrations of John Bracken and, after 1943, Stuart Garson.

Wilson again defeated a candidate of the CCF in the 1945 provincial election. He did not run in 1949.
