= Dennis Smook =

Canadian politician

Member of the Legislative Assembly of Manitoba for La Verendrye
- In office October 4, 2011 – September 5, 2023
- Preceded by: Ron Lemieux
- Succeeded by: Konrad Narth

Personal details
- Party: Progressive Conservative

Dennis Smook is a Canadian politician, formerly a member of the Legislative Assembly of Manitoba representing the electoral district of La Verendrye as a member of the Progressive Conservative Party of Manitoba. He was first elected in the 2011 provincial election, and re-elected in 2016 and 2019.

== Electoral record ==
2019 Manitoba general election: La Verendrye
Party	Candidate	Votes	%	±%	Expenditures
Progressive Conservative	Dennis Smook	5,305	72.81	+2.04	$13,774.87
New Democratic	Erin McGee	1,052	14.44	+4.96	$150.00
Liberal	Lorena Mitchell	929	12.75	+3.39	$2,425.53
Total valid votes		7,295	99.14		
Total rejected ballots		63			
Turnout		7,358			
Eligible voters					

2016 Manitoba general election: La Verendrye
Party	Candidate	Votes	%	±%
Progressive Conservative	Dennis Smook	5,262	71.23	7.16
Green	Janine Gibson	724	9.80	5.02
New Democratic	Echo Asher	705	9.54	-16.59
Liberal	Bill Paulishyn	696	9.42	4.41
Total valid votes		7,387	–	–
Rejected		78	–	
Eligible voters / turnout		13,494	55.32	1.71
Source(s) Source: Manitoba. Chief Electoral Officer (2016). Statement of Votes for the 41st Provincial General Election, April 19, 2016 (PDF) (Report). Winnipeg: Elections Manitoba.

2011 Manitoba general election: La Verendrye
Party	Candidate	Votes	%	±%	Expenditures
Progressive Conservative	Dennis Smook	4,487	64.07	26.25	$20,489.51
New Democratic	Maurice Tallaire	1,830	26.13	-24.99	$11,908.18
Liberal	Monica Guetre	351	5.01	-1.22	$4,148.98
Green	Janine Gibson	335	4.78	–	$0.00
Total valid votes		7,003	–	–	
Rejected		30	–		
Eligible voters / turnout		13,119	53.61	-6.45	
Source(s) Source: Manitoba. Chief Electoral Officer (2011). Statement of Votes for the 40th Provincial General Election, October 4, 2011 (PDF) (Report). Winnipeg: Elections Manitoba.
