= Ron Lemieux =

Canadian politician (born 1950)

Ron Lemieux MLA

Minister of Tourism, Culture, Sport and Consumer Protection
- In office October 18, 2013 – May 3, 2016
- Premier: Greg Selinger
- Preceded by: Flor Marcelino

Manitoba Minister of Local Government
- In office November 3, 2009 – October 18, 2013
- Premier: Greg Selinger
- Preceded by: Steve Ashton
- Succeeded by: Stan Struthers

Manitoba Minister of Infrastructure and Transportation
- In office September 21, 2006 – November 3, 2009
- Premier: Gary Doer; Greg Selinger
- Preceded by: new portfolio
- Succeeded by: Steve Ashton

Manitoba Minister of Transportation and Government Services
- In office November 4, 2003 – September 21, 2006
- Premier: Gary Doer
- Preceded by: Scott Smith
- Succeeded by: portfolio abolished

Manitoba Minister of Education and Youth
- In office September 25, 2002 – November 4, 2003
- Premier: Gary Doer
- Preceded by: Drew Caldwell
- Succeeded by: Peter Bjornson

Manitoba Minister of Culture, Heritage and Tourism
- In office January 17, 2001 – September 25, 2002
- Premier: Gary Doer
- Preceded by: Diane McGifford
- Succeeded by: Eric Robinson

Manitoba Minister of Consumer and Corporate Affairs
- In office October 5, 1999 – January 17, 2001
- Premier: Gary Doer
- Preceded by: Shirley Render
- Succeeded by: Scott Smith

Member of the Legislative Assembly of Manitoba for Dawson Trail La Verendrye, 1999–2011
- In office October 4, 2011 – April 19, 2016
- Preceded by: new constituency
- Succeeded by: Bob Lagassé
- In office September 21, 1999 – October 4, 2011
- Preceded by: Ben Sveinson
- Succeeded by: Dennis Smook

Personal details
- Born: August 15, 1950 (age 76) Dauphin, Manitoba, Canada
- Party: New Democratic Party
- Education: University of Winnipeg; University of Manitoba

Ron Lemieux, MLA (born August 15, 1950) is a Canadian politician, who was an elected member of the Legislative Assembly of Manitoba from 1999 to 2016, and a former professional ice hockey player.

== Biography ==
Born in Dauphin, Manitoba, Lemieux was an ice hockey defenceman and was selected by the Pittsburgh Penguins 110th overall in the 1970 NHL Amateur Draft. Lemieux started with the Dauphin Kings of the Manitoba Junior Hockey League, helping the Kings to the Manitoba championship in 1971–72. He played for the Green Bay Bobcats in the United States Hockey League for the 1974–75 season (scoring seven goals and eighteen assists), but was never called up to the NHL. He later coached girls' hockey in Lorette, Manitoba and St. Adolphe.

After leaving hockey, Lemieux received degrees in Bachelor of Arts in 1979 and Bachelor of Education in 1985 from the University of Winnipeg. He completed post-baccalaureate work in education at the University of Manitoba. He worked as a teacher for several years, coaching various high school teams and holding positions in the teacher's association.

In the provincial election of 1999, Lemieux was elected to the Manitoba legislature for the rural riding of La Verendrye, defeating Progressive Conservative incumbent Ben Sveinson by 3,533 votes to 3,367. Lemieux's victory was something of an upset, as it occurred in a riding which had never before been won by the New Democratic Party or its social-democratic predecessors (despite having existed since 1879).

On October 5, 1999, Premier of Manitoba Gary Doer appointed Lemieux to be Minister of Consumer of Corporate Affairs, with responsibility for the Gaming Control Act. He was relieved of the latter responsibility on July 4, 2000; after a cabinet shuffle on January 17, 2001, he was appointed Minister of Culture, Heritage and Tourism with responsibility for Sport.

Lemieux later served as Minister of Education and Youth from September 25, 2002, until he was reassigned as Minister of Transportation and Government Services on November 4, 2003. In the 2003 election, Lemieux was re-elected with 58% of his riding's vote.

In September 2006 he was appointed Minister of Infrastructure and Transportation in Gary Doer's new cabinet.

In November 2009, Premier Greg Selinger named Lemieux as Minister of Local Government. He served in this capacity until October 2013, when he became Minister of Tourism, Culture, Sport and Consumer Protection. He did not seek a fifth term as MLA at the 2016 provincial election.

Lemieux has described his political views as being closer to the "New Labour" philosophy espoused by former Prime Minister of the United Kingdom Tony Blair than to traditional democratic socialism. In 2003, he supported Bill Blaikie's campaign to become leader of the federal New Democratic Party. He was re-elected in the 2007 and 2011 provincial elections.
