= Robert Banman =

Canadian politician

Member of the Manitoba Legislative Assembly for La Verendrye
- In office 1973–1986
- Preceded by: Stan Roberts
- Succeeded by: Leonard Barkman

Personal details
- Born: January 10, 1945 (age 81) Winnipeg, Manitoba, Canada
- Party: Progressive Conservative Party of Manitoba

Robert David "Bob" Banman (born January 10, 1945) is a Canadian politician from the province of Manitoba. He was a member of the Legislative Assembly of Manitoba from 1973 to 1986, and served as a cabinet minister in the government of Sterling Lyon.

The son of Jacob G. Banman and Barbara Enns, he was born in Winnipeg in 1945 and raised in Steinbach, Manitoba. He worked as an automobile dealer after graduating from high school and was on the Steinbach Town Council from 1970 to 1973. In 1968, Banman married Joanne Baerg.

He was first elected to the Manitoba legislature in the 1973 Manitoba general election, defeating incumbent Liberal Leonard Barkman by about 550 votes in the rural riding of La Verendrye. He was re-elected in the 1977 election, which was won by the Conservatives under Sterling Lyon.

Banman was named Minister of Industry and Commerce and Manitoba Minister of Tourism, Recreation and Cultural Affairs|Minister of Tourism, Recreation and Cultural Affairs on October 24, 1977, also holding responsibility for the Manitoba Development Corporation Act. Following a cabinet shuffle on October 20, 1978, he was named Minister of Fitness, Recreation and Sport and Minister of Cooperative Development, with responsibility for the MDCA. On November 15, 1979, he was also named responsible for the Communities Economic Development Fund and the Manitoba Lotteries Corporation Act (which was retitled the Manitoba Lotteries and Gaming Control Act on January 16, 1981). As Industry Minister, he considered privatizing the government-owned company McKenzie Seeds.

The Progressive Conservatives were defeated in the provincial election of 1981, but Banman was re-elected in his own riding by 3,269 votes. He did not run for a fourth term as MLA in 1986.
