= John Siveright =

Canadian fur trader

John Siveright was a fur trader and later became Chief Factor of the Hudson's Bay Company. Born 2 December 1779 in Drumdelgy, Cairnie, Scotland, he was the son of John Siveright I and Jannet Glass.

Siveright began in the fur trade with the New North West Company (sometimes known as the XY Company) on a seven-year contract in 1799. The New North West Company merged into the North West Company in 1804 he continued his service. By 1815, when he was at Fort La Reine (Portage la Prairie, Man.), he was cited by the Hudson's Bay Company as part of a conspiracy by the NWC to destroy the Red River Colony. He was at Fort Gibraltar when Duncan Cameron was arrested and was charged as an accessory in the murder of Governor Robert Semple a short time later. The charges against him were not pursued to conclusion because of other acquittals. In 1817 he became a member of the Beaver Club.

John married a Metis woman named Louise Roussin. They had a daughter named Josephte who married Alexis Goulet and had numerous children including Maxime, Elzear and Leonide Goulet, who was the grandfather of George R. D. Goulet.

He died 4 September 1856 in Edinburgh, Scotland, and is buried in Warriston Cemetery in Edinburgh.
