= A. D. Penner =

Canadian businessman and politician (1910–2008)

- Born: Abraham Dueck Penner; September 3, 1910; Hanover, Manitoba, Canada
- Died: March 7, 2008 (aged 97); Steinbach, Manitoba, Canada
- Occupations: Businessman; politician

Abraham Dueck Penner (1910–2008) was a Canadian businessman and politician from Steinbach, Manitoba, who was instrumental in transforming and modernizing the lifestyle of the conservative Kleine Gemeinde Mennonites of the region.

Penner was born on a farm just outside of Steinbach to a Russian Mennonite family on September 3, 1910, and established Steinbach's first Dodge dealership in 1937. While serving on Steinbach City Council from 1947 to 1957, he helped establish Steinbach as a town separate from the Rural Municipality of Hanover.

Most significantly, however, was his cultural impact on the Mennonite community, leading to the assimilation of the Mennonites in southern Manitoba into mainstream society. Prior to Penner, Kleine Gemeinde Mennonites were reserved, spoke Plautdietsch, were primarily agrarian, and eschewed flashiness and consumerist consumption. Penner spoke English, was flamboyant and aggressive in his lifestyle, political leadership and approach to business. During the 1950s, he "created a new helm for businessmen" of the region that was not based on agriculture. His buildings were "ultramodern" and his approach was aggressive, all things that clashed with the traditional lifestyle of the local Mennonites. In 1960 Penner tore down the last historic housebarn in Steinbach, an act of destruction that spurred on concerned locals to create the Mennonite Heritage Village in order preserve the area's remaining historic buildings. Whereas the traditional Mennonite lifestyle meant that Steinbach had had a primarily agricultural-based economy before this time, Penner coined the phrase "The Automobile City" and promoted Steinbach as a centre for the automobile trade in Manitoba, a reputation that still stands today. By 1960, Carillon News observed that "things aren't as simple as they used to be in this peaceful Mennonite darp." Penner was a co-creator of the 18-hole Steinbach Fly-in Golf Course which was completed in 1970, with Premier Ed Schreyer presiding over the opening.

Penner was mayor of Steinbach from 1971 to 1980. He died on March 7, 2008. A large park in his name was established in north Steinbach. Steinbach's "Abe's Hill" is also named in his honour and is a popular tobogganing site in winter located in L.A. Barkman Kinsmen Park on the west side of Steinbach.
