= Stan Roberts =

Canadian politician (1927–1990)

Member of the Manitoba Legislative Assembly for La Verendrye
- In office 1958–1962
- Preceded by: Albert Vielfaure
- Succeeded by: Edmond Brodeur

Personal details
- Born: Stanley Carl Roberts; January 17, 1927 St. Adolphe, Manitoba, Canada
- Died: September 6, 1990 (aged 63) Burnaby, British Columbia, Canada
- Party: Manitoba Liberal Party; Liberal-Progressive (1958–61)
- Other political affiliations: Liberal (federal); Reform (federal); BC Liberal
- Education: University of Manitoba; University of Western Ontario

Stanley Carl Roberts (January 17, 1927 – September 6, 1990) was a Canadian politician. He was a member of the Legislative Assembly of Manitoba between 1958 and 1962, and ran for the leadership of the Manitoba Liberal Party in 1961. He was later involved with the Liberal Party of Canada, and was a founding member of the Reform Party of Canada.

== Early years ==
Roberts was born in St. Adolphe, Manitoba in 1927, later farming there, and received of Bachelor of Science degree from the University of Manitoba and an MBA from Western University. He was first elected to the Manitoba legislature in 1958, as a Liberal-Progressive candidate in the francophone riding of La Verendrye (Roberts was himself bilingual). Although Dufferin Roblin's Progressive Conservative (PC) Party won the general election, Roberts defeated his Tory opponent Stan Bisson by 1565 votes to 1395. He was re-elected in 1959, defeating PC candidate Edmond Guertin.

When Douglas Campbell resigned as Liberal-Progressive leader in 1961, Roberts ran to succeed him. He represented a "left opposition" within the party, and accused its more conservative leadership of being ineffective against Roblin's centrist/progressive government. He was defeated by establishment candidate Gildas Molgat by 475 votes to 279 on April 20, 1961, one day after the party formally renamed itself the Manitoba Liberal Party.

== Resignation ==
Roberts resigned from the legislature to contest the 1962 federal election in the riding of Provencher; he was defeated by Progressive Conservative Warner Jorgenson by about a thousand votes. He again lost to Jorgenson in the 1963 federal election, by a slightly greater margin.

Roberts subsequently served as president and acting leader of the Manitoba Liberal Party from 1969 to 1970 (after party leader Robert Bend failed to win his seat in the 1969 provincial election). He also worked as an executive officer for McCabe Grain Company Limited, later National Grain Company Limited. In 1971, he was named vice-president of Simon Fraser University, serving until 1976.

== Constitutional reform involvement ==
In 1976, Roberts became the first president of the Canada West Foundation. In this capacity, he took a leading role in arguing for the position of the west in Canada's constitutional debates. He also developed contacts with Ernest and Preston Manning. In late 1978, Roberts expressed interest in Francis Winspear's proposed constitutional reforms, which included Senate reform and the equal treatment of all provinces.

During this period, Roberts made several speeches warning about the possibility of western separatism. There were some within the Canada West Foundation who believed that Roberts himself was partly sympathetic to separatism; he never became affiliated with the movement, but was forced to step down as CWF President in December 1980 after some controversial statements on the subject. In 1980, he moved from British Columbia to Toronto after being named president of the Canadian Chamber of Commerce. Roberts left that position in 1982.

Roberts remained loyal to the Liberal Party during this period. He ran for the leadership of the British Columbia Liberal Party in 1984, but lost to former Member of Parliament Art Lee on the first ballot. Roberts's participation in this contest probably prevented him from running to succeed Pierre Trudeau as leader of the federal party. Roberts disagreed with the selection of John Turner as party leader, but he nevertheless ran for the federal Liberals in the Quebec riding of Lachine in 1984, losing to Progressive Conservative Bob Layton.

== Reform Party of Canada ==
After this election, Roberts began to consider forming a new political party. The federal Liberal Party had long been weak in western Canada, and won only two seats west of Ontario in 1984. Roberts believed that a new party might be necessary to oppose Progressive Conservative Prime Minister Brian Mulroney in western Canada. In 1987, he became involved with Francis Winspear, Preston Manning and Ted Byfield in plans to create what would later become the Reform Party of Canada.

Roberts was in many respects an unlikely figure within this group. His political philosophy was centrist, perhaps somewhat left-of-centre. He was not an uncritical supporter of free-market economics, and he does not seem to have been a social conservative. Nevertheless, he was willing to work with more conservative figures to create the new party.

Even before the Reform Party's founding convention (October 30-November 1, 1987), Roberts began to have concerns about the new party's ideology. He opposed its regionalist aspects, and was concerned by its popularity with voters who opposed bilingualism and Quebec's role in Canada's Confederation. One week before the founding convention, he agreed to stand for the party's leadership against Preston Manning, the only other declared candidate.

At the convention, Manning's supporters among the convention-goers voted to close the registration process one day ahead of schedule, perhaps fearing Roberts was planning to bus in several "instant delegates". After failed negotiations with the Manning camp, Roberts dropped out of the race on November 1, claiming that Manning's supporters had hijacked the party from its original intentions. He referred to Manning's supporters as "fanatical Albertans" and "small-minded evangelical cranks".

Roberts subsequently sought the Reform Party's nomination in the British Columbia riding of Saanich—Gulf Islands for the 1988 federal election, but was defeated. He had no further involvement with the Reform Party, and died of a brain tumour in Burnaby two years later, on September 6, 1990.
