= Théophile Paré =

Canadian politician

Théophile Paré (December 1, 1850 – November 17, 1926) was a farmer and political figure in Manitoba. He represented La Verendrye from 1892 to 1899 in the Legislative Assembly of Manitoba as a Conservative.

He was born in Lacine, Canada East, the son of Louis Paré, and was educated at the Séminaire de Sainte-Thérèse. Paré was registrar for La Verendrye County from 1882 to 1890 and was secretary-treasurer for the rural Municipalities of Ste. Anne and La Broquerie. Hé was defeated when he ran for reelection to the Manitoba assembly in 1899.

Paré was married to Angelique Nolan. After her death in 1904, he moved to St. Boniface, Manitoba and entered the priesthood in 1906.

Paré died in St. Boniface at the age of 75.
