= Konrad Narth =

Canadian politician

Konrad Narth MLA

Leader of the Opposition of Manitoba
- Incumbent
- Assumed office September 29, 2026
- Preceded by: Obby Khan

Leader of the Progressive Conservative Party of Manitoba
- Interim
- Assumed office September 29, 2026
- Preceded by: Obby Khan
- Succeeded by: TBD

Member of the Legislative Assembly of Manitoba for La Verendrye
- Incumbent
- Assumed office October 3, 2023
- Preceded by: Dennis Smook

Personal details
- Born: c. 1987 Zhoda, Manitoba, Canada
- Party: Progressive Conservative
- Spouse: Candice
- Children: 2
- Education: University of Manitoba (BA); University of Winnipeg (BBA)

Konrad Narth (born c. 1987) is a Canadian politician and farmer who has served as the interim leader of the Progressive Conservative Party of Manitoba and leader of the Opposition since 2026. A member of the Legislative Assembly of Manitoba (MLA), he has represented the electoral district of La Verendrye since 2023.

== Political career ==
Narth was elected to the council of the Rural Municipality of Stuartburn in 2010 at the age of 23, and served on council for 12 years.

On October 24, 2023, he was appointed as the Shadow Minister for Sport, Culture, Heritage and Tourism and as the Shadow Minister for Manitoba Liquor & Lotteries.

After the resignation of Obby Khan, Narth was named interim leader of the Progressive Conservative Party. He will lead the party into the 2027 Manitoba general election, after being endorsed by the PC's executive council.

== Electoral history ==
2023 Manitoba general election: La Verendrye
Party	Candidate	Votes	%	±%	Expenditures
Progressive Conservative	Konrad Narth	4,586	61.02	-11.77	$15,816.55
New Democratic	Bianca Siem	1,554	20.68	+5.34	$168.00
Keystone	Matthew Wiebe	736	9.79	–	$1,782.49
Liberal	Monica Guetre	640	8.52	-4.36	$4,912.37
Total valid votes/expense limit		7,516	99.47	+0.33	$54,396.00
Total rejected and declined ballots		40	0.53	–	
Turnout		7,556	55.54	+0.13	
Eligible voters		13,604			
Progressive Conservative hold		Swing		-9.06	
Source(s) Source: Elections Manitoba
