= Edmond Brodeur =

Canadian politician

Joseph Edmond Brodeur (July 5, 1898 – May 19, 1988) was a politician in Manitoba, Canada. He served in the Legislative Assembly of Manitoba as a Liberal-Progressive from 1952 to 1958.

== Biography ==
Brodeur was born in 1898 at St. Hyacinthe, Quebec and was educated at St. Boniface College. He was a member of the Knights of Columbus, reaching the fourth degree by the mid-1950s. He was secretary-treasurer for the Rural Municipality of Ritchot. Brodeur ran an insurance agency and also operated a garage in partnership with his brother.

He was first elected to the Manitoba legislature in a by-election held on January 21, 1952, in the rural constituency of La Verendrye. He was re-elected without difficulty in the 1953 provincial election, and was a backbench supporter of Douglas Campbell's government during his time in the legislature. He did not seek re-election in 1958.

Brodeur died in Winnipeg and was buried in St. Adolphe.
