= Stephen Emmett Clement =

Canadian politician

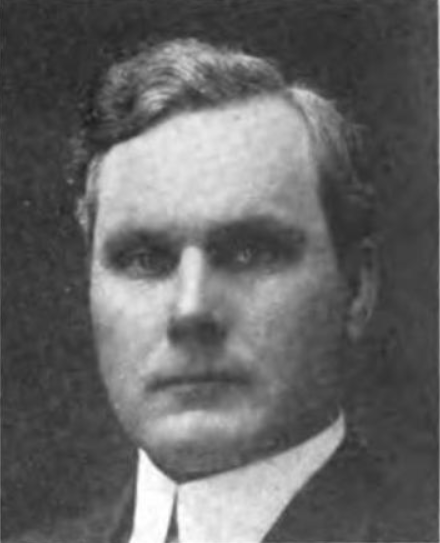

Member of the Legislative Assembly of Manitoba
- In office 1915–1920

Mayor of Brandon, Manitoba
- In office 1907–1908

Personal details
- Born: October 14, 1867 Cookstown, Ontario
- Died: December 31, 1947 (aged 80) Brandon, Manitoba
- Party: Liberal
- Spouse: Aleta E. Paisley (m. 1899)
- Parent: Stephen Clement (father)
- Education: Wesley College
- Occupation: Politician

Stephen Emmett Clement (October 14, 1867 – December 31, 1947) was a politician in Manitoba, Canada. He served in the Legislative Assembly of Manitoba from 1915 to 1920 as a member of the Liberal Party. His father, also named Stephen Clement, was a member of the legislature from 1881 to 1882.

Clement was born in Cookstown, Ontario, was educated there and moved to Brandon, Manitoba with his family in 1882. He continued his education at public schools in Brandon and received a Bachelor of Arts degree from Wesley College. He went on to study law, was called to the Manitoba bar in 1895 and set up practice in Brandon. In 1899, Clement married Aleta E. Paisley. He served as mayor of Brandon from 1907 to 1908, and was chosen as president of the Canadian Club in 1912. Clement was a Methodist in religion, and a director of Manitoba's Wesley College.

He first sought election to the Manitoba legislature in the provincial election of 1914, running against Conservative cabinet minister George R. Coldwell in the constituency of Brandon City. He lost by 163 votes. He contested Brandon City again in the 1915 provincial election, and this time defeated newly chosen Conservative leader James Albert Manning Aikins by 701 votes. The Liberals won a landslide majority in this election, and Clement served as a backbench supporter of Tobias Norris's government for the next five years.

Clement was defeated in the 1920 provincial election, losing to Labour candidate Albert Edward Smith by 604 votes.

From 1927 to 1944, he served as a county court judge.

He died in Brandon at the age of 80.
