= Provincial Rights Party (Manitoba) =

Political party in Manitoba, Canada

The Provincial Rights Party was a political party in Manitoba, Canada, founded by Thomas Greenway and James Thomas Johns in 1882. It opposed the John Norquay government for its closeness to the Conservative Party of Canada led by John A. Macdonald, the Prime Minister of Canada. It called for greater provincial control over natural resources and the railway, before merging with the fledgling Manitoba Liberal Party.
