= James Fisher (Manitoba politician) =

Canadian politician

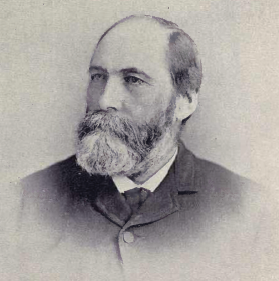

Member of the Legislative Assembly of Manitoba

Personal details
- Born: November 6, 1840
- Died: March 8, 1927 (aged 86)

James Fisher (November 6, 1840 – March 8, 1927) was a politician in Manitoba, Canada. He may have served as leader of the parliamentary opposition in the Legislative Assembly of Manitoba for a brief period in the mid-1890s.

Born at Glenquaich in Perthshire, Scotland, Fisher moved to Canada West (now Ontario) in his youth. He was educated at the University of Toronto, and was a member of that body's Senate.

In July 1875, Fisher contested a federal by-election in Perth North for the Liberals, losing to Conservative Andrew Monteith by 20 votes. He was defeated in the same riding in the general election of 1878.

Fisher subsequently moved to Winnipeg, where he practised law and was a member of the University of Manitoba Council. In 1886, he ran for the provincial riding of Russell as a Liberal, losing to Conservative Edward Leacock by eight votes. He was easily elected in his second attempt for the seat, in the Liberal landslide victory of 1888.

Fisher soon lost confidence in the government of Thomas Greenway, and crossed the floor to the opposition. He was re-elected without opposition in 1892, and appears to have served as the de facto leader of the opposition from 1894 to 1896. He did not identify himself as a Conservative, but sat among their ranks in parliament.

Fisher was re-elected in 1896, but did not contest the election of 1899. In 1897, while still serving as a Member of the Legislative Assembly (MLA), he served in a Hudson's Bay Expedition unit.
