= John Wright Sifton =

Canadian politician

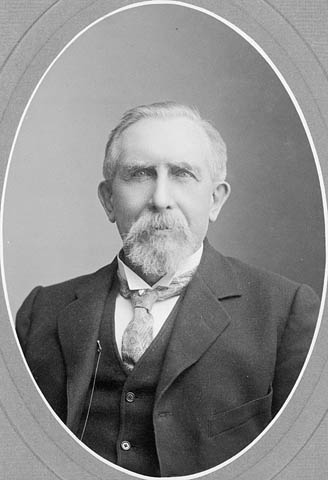

4th Speaker of the Legislative Assembly of Manitoba
- In office January 21, 1880 – December 1882
- Preceded by: Joseph Dubuc
- Succeeded by: Gilbert McMicken

Member of the Legislative Assembly of Manitoba for St. Clements
- In office 1879–1881

Member of the Legislative Assembly of Manitoba for Brandon
- In office 1881–1883

Personal details
- Born: August 10, 1833 London Township, Upper Canada
- Died: September 19, 1912 (aged 79) Winnipeg, Manitoba
- Spouse: Kate Watkins
- Children: 5, including Arthur Sifton and Sir Clifford Sifton
- Occupation: Businessman

John Wright Sifton (August 10, 1833 – September 19, 1912) was a Canadian politician who was the 4th Speaker of the Legislative Assembly of Manitoba and the founder of an important political family in Western Canada.

== Life and career ==
Sifton was the son of Bamlet Sifton (1793–1876) and his wife Mary (née Evans), members of the Anglo-Irish gentry who arrived in Upper Canada in 1832 from County Tipperary, Ireland. Members of the Sifton family, including Sifton's grandparents, Charles Sifton (1752–1842) and his wife Rebecca (née Wright), had already established themselves around present-day London, Ontario, in 1818 and 1819.

Born in London Township, Upper Canada, Sifton was educated at local schools. In October 1853, he married Kate Watkins (d. March 1909), third daughter of James Watkins of Parsonstown, Kings County, Ireland. He became a farmer and oil producer in Lambton County.

Following the birth of his son Clifford in 1861, Sifton became a railway contractor in Brant County and then a businessman in London, Ontario. The Siftons went on to have five children in all.

In religion, Sifton was a Wesleyan Methodist, and in politics he was a Reformer, and supporter of and campaigner for George Brown and Alexander Mackenzie. When Mackenzie as Prime Minister formed Canada's first Liberal government in 1874, Sifton was rewarded with contracts to build two sections of rail line between northern Ontario and Manitoba, and telegraph lines in the latter province.

In 1875, Sifton relocated to Manitoba, settling in Selkirk, and he became involved in the new province's political life. Sifton was twice elected to the Manitoba legislature, including in the 1879 provincial election as the Member of the Legislative Assembly for St. Clements, and served as the first Liberal Speaker of the body from February to December 1879, when he left the legislature. He was elected again as MLA in 1881 representing the new constituency of Brandon, however, he was defeated in his bid for re-election. He attempted to regain a seat in the 1886 election, but was defeated once again.

Sifton moved to Brandon, Manitoba, to take part in the town's land boom, but he suffered when the boom turned into a bust. He operated a large farm there and served two terms as reeve for the Rural Municipality of Cornwallis. After his 1886 defeat, he moved to California for two years. He eventually returned to Manitoba and filled a series of patronage positions, serving as deputy minister of public works in the government of Thomas Greenway and then as inspector of public institutions.

In 1902, Sifton became vice-president of the Manitoba Free Press Company and subsequently served as its president. He was also a strong supporter of prohibition and advocated passage of the Canada Temperance Act.

One of his sons, Clifford Sifton, would be elected in the 1888 provincial election. He served as Attorney-General of Manitoba and education minister in the 1890s, and he would go on to have a successful career in federal politics under Sir Wilfrid Laurier. Another son, Arthur Sifton, would serve as Premier of Alberta.
