= Sauveur Marcoux =

Canadian politician

Sauveur Marcoux (May 2, 1893 – November 16, 1951) was a politician in Manitoba, Canada. He served in the Legislative Assembly of Manitoba as a Liberal-Progressive from 1936 until the time of his death, and was a cabinet minister in the governments of John Bracken, Stuart Garson and Douglas Campbell.

The son of Leon Marcoux and Adeline Ferland, Marcoux was born in Lorette, Manitoba, was educated in Lorette and St. Boniface, and worked as a farmer. He served as reeve for the Rural Municipality of Taché and was an active member of l'Association des Canadiens-Français du Manitoba and in l'Association des Commissaires d'écoles Canadiens-Français du Manitoba. He was also a member of the Laurier Club and the Canadian Club. He was a Liberal by background, and became a member of the Liberal-Progressives following the merger of the two constituent parties. In 1920, Marcoux married Eloria Normandeau.

He was first elected to the Manitoba legislature in the 1936 provincial election, defeating Conservative candidate Joseph Hamelin by 830 votes in the La Verendrye constituency. He was appointed to Bracken's cabinet on September 27, 1936, as a minister without portfolio, representing the interests of Manitoba's francophone community.

Marcoux was re-elected in the 1941 provincial election, defeating a Social Credit candidate by 490 votes. He increased his majority in the 1945 election, and defeated independent candidate E.J.R. Arpin by 373 votes in the 1949 campaign.

After serving as a minister without portfolio for over twelve years (perhaps a Canadian record), Marcoux was promoted to Municipal Commissioner by Premier Douglas Campbell on December 14, 1948. He served in this portfolio until his death, in St. Boniface in November 1951.
