= William Doig =

Canadian politician

Representative for Russell in the Legislative Assembly of Manitoba
- In office 1903–1907

Personal details
- Born: William James Doig; May 16, 1867; Owen Sound, Ontario
- Died: May 9, 1924 (aged 56); Russell, Manitoba
- Political party: Liberal
- Spouse: Mary Maude Heath (m. 1918)
- Occupation: merchant, politician

William James Doig (May 16, 1867 – May 9, 1924) was a merchant and political figure in Manitoba. He represented Russell from 1903 to 1907 in the Legislative Assembly of Manitoba as a Liberal.

He was born in Owen Sound, Ontario, of Scottish descent. Doig served during the North-West Rebellion. He operated a hardware store in Russell, Manitoba, first built on the site of the former Hudson's Bay Company post. Later, he also sold farm implements, furniture and automobiles. In 1913, Doig served on the first town council for Russell. He married the widow of William Heath, Mary Maude Heath, in 1918.

Doig died in Russell at the age of 56.

His brother Alfred also served in the Manitoba assembly.
