= James Prendergast (Canadian politician) =

Canadian politician (1858–1945)

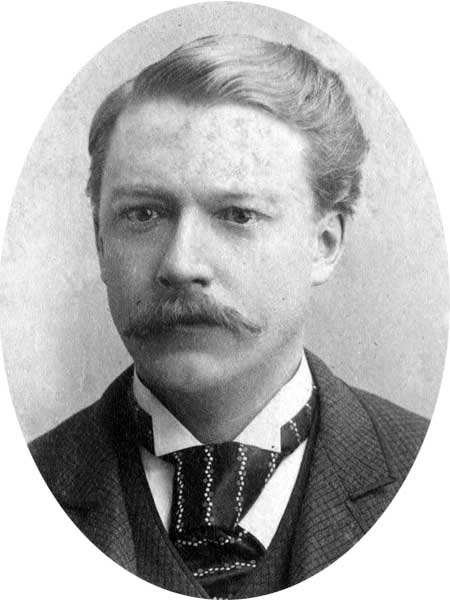
James Emile Pierre Prendergast

James Emile Pierre Prendergast (March 22, 1858 – April 18, 1945) was a lawyer, judge and political figure in Manitoba. He represented La Verendrye from 1885 to 1888 and Woodlands from 1888 to 1892 and St. Boniface from 1892 to 1896 in the Legislative Assembly of Manitoba as a Conservative and later Liberal.

== Biography ==
Prendergast was born in Quebec City, Canada East, the son of James Pierre Prendergast and Emeline Gauvreau, and was educated at Université Laval. Prendergast was called to the Quebec bar in 1881. In 1882, he came to Manitoba, was called to the Manitoba bar in 1883 and practised law in Winnipeg. In 1886, he married Olivina Mondor.

He was elected to the Manitoba assembly in an 1885 by-election held after Louis Prud'homme was named a county court judge. Prendergast served in the provincial cabinet as Provincial Secretary. In 1890, he left the cabinet over the Manitoba Schools Question and joined the opposition.

Prendergast was mayor of St. Boniface from 1893 to 1896. He served as president of the Saint-Jean-Baptiste Society for Manitoba in 1886 and 1910 and for Saskatchewan in 1905 and 1909. Prendergast was a county court judge for the Northern division of the Eastern judicial district of Manitoba from 1897 to 1902; he was a judge in the Supreme Court of the North-West Territories from 1902 to 1906, a judge in the Supreme Court of Saskatchewan from 1906 to 1910 and a judge in the Manitoba Court of King's Bench from 1910 to 1922. He was named to the Manitoba Court of Appeal in 1922. In 1929, he became Chief Justice in the Court of Appeal; he retired from the bench in 1944. Prendergast also served in the Roman Catholic section of the Manitoba Board of Education, the council for the University of Manitoba and the senate of the University of Saskatchewan.

Prendergast also published two booklets of poems and served as co-editor of the French language newspaper Le Manitoba. For his contributions to the arts, he was elected to the French Académie des muses santones in Rouen. In 1944, he was appointed Knight Commander of the Order of St. Gregory by Pope Pius XII.

He died from a heart attack in Winnipeg at the age of 87 and was buried in St. Boniface.
