= William Lagimodière =

Canadian politician

William Lagimodière (April 29, 1857 – October 2, 1930) was a farmer and political figure in Manitoba. He represented La Verendrye from 1888 to 1892 and from 1899 to 1907 in the Legislative Assembly of Manitoba as a Liberal.

He was born in St. Boniface, Manitoba, the son of Elzéar Lagimodière and Sarah Goulet, and was educated at St. Joseph's College there. In 1880, he married Lucy Genthon. Lagimodière served as secretary-treasurer for the Rural Municipality of Taché from 1880 to 1903. He was also a homestead inspector from 1905 to 1929. He was defeated when he ran for reelection to the Manitoba assembly in 1892 and 1896, and again in 1907. Lagimodière died at home in Lorette.

Lagimodière was the great-grandson of Jean-Baptiste Lagimodière and Marie-Anne Gaboury, who were also the grandparents of Louis Riel.
