= La Verendrye (electoral district) =

Provincial electoral district in Manitoba, Canada

Coordinates: 49.525°N 95.800°W

La Vérendrye
Manitoba electoral district

Provincial electoral district
- Legislature: Legislative Assembly of Manitoba
MLA
Konrad Narth
Progressive Conservative
- District created: 1879
- First contested: 1879
- Last contested: 2023

Demographics
- Population (2021): 25,185
- Electors (2023): 13,279
- Area (km²): 7,329
- Pop. density (per km²): 3.4
- Region: Eastman

La Vérendrye is a provincial electoral district of Manitoba, Canada. It was created by redistribution in 1879, and has existed since that time, making it one of the oldest ridings in Manitoba.

Located in the southeastern region of the province, it is bordered within Manitoba by the neighbouring electoral divisions of Lac du Bonnet, Dawson Trail, Steinbach, Springfield-Ritchot, Midland, and Borderland to the west and north; by the province of Ontario to the east; and by the U.S. state of Minnesota to most of the south.

Communities in the riding include Buffalo Point (and Buffalo Point First Nation), Gardenton, Grunthal, Kleefeld, La Broquerie, Marchand, Middlebro, New Bothwell, Otterburne, Piney, St. Malo, St-Pierre-Jolys, Sarto, Sprague, Stuartburn, Sundown, Vassar, Vita, and Woodridge. The Lake of the Woods' Buffalo Bay is also in the riding.

La Vérendrye was a hotly contested riding between the Liberals and Conservatives in its earliest years. After 1922, it became dominated by the Progressives, who later became the Liberal-Progressives before metamorphosizing into the Liberals again. It remained with the Liberals even as the party dwindled to third-party status in the 1960s. The Progressive Conservative Party of Manitoba (PCs) seized the riding in 1973 and held it for the next three decades, during which time it was usually fairly safe for the PCs.

In the 1999 election, Ron Lemieux became the first New Democrat to be elected for the constituency. He was re-elected in the 2003 election with almost 60% of the popular vote. The boundary changes of 2008 greatly changed the borders of the riding, which contributed to the decisive victory of PC candidate Dennis Smook in the 2011 election. Lemieux was personally re-elected to the newly created riding of Dawson Trail.

The La Vérendrye riding has remained under PCs since 2011, with Konrad Narth most recently being elected in October 2023 to replace retiring MLA Smook.

The riding is named for Pierre Gaultier de Varennes, Sieur de La Vérendrye, explorer and fur trader under whose authority Fort Rouge was built in 1738 in what is now Winnipeg.

== Demographics ==
The riding's population in 1996 was 19,558. In 1999, the average family income was $49,308, and the unemployment rate was 5.9%. Manufacturing accounts for 12% of the riding's industry, followed by the service sector at 11%.

Before the electoral boundaries redistricting done prior to the 2011 election, La Verendrye had the second-highest francophone population in Manitoba (after St. Boniface), at 23% of the total population. Nine percent of the riding's residents were German, and 7% were Indigenous.

As of the 2021 census, the riding has a total population of 25,185, 92.5% of whom are Canadian citizens. The median age of constituents is 32.8. The construction industry accounts for 15.2% of the riding's labour force, followed by agriculture, forestry, fishing, and hunting at 14%.

People of German ethnicity now make up the largest ethnic or cultural group of the riding's population with 25.3%, followed by Mennonites at 17.6% and French at 14.5%. Seventeen point two percent of the population were identified to have Indigenous identity.

As of 2021, the community includes two hospitals, four personal care homes, and 17 schools.

== Members of the Legislative Assembly ==
Name	Party	Took office	Left office
Maxime Goulet	Government/Conservative	1879	1882
Louis Prud'homme	Cons	1882	1883
Maxime Goulet	Independent Conservative	1883	1884
Louis Prud'homme	Cons	1884	1885
James Prendergast	Conservative-Liberal	1885	1888
	Lib	1888	1888
William Lagimodiere	Lib	1888	1892
Theophile Pare	Cons	1892	1899
William Lagimodiere	Lib	1899	1907
Jean Lauzon	Cons	1907	1910
William Molloy	Lib	1910	1914
Jean Lauzon	Cons	1914	1915
Philippe Talbot	Lib, later Independent	1915	1920
	Independent	1920	1922
	Prog	1922	1932
	Lib-Prog	1932	1936
Sauveur Marcoux	Lib-Prog	1936	1951
Edmond Brodeur	Lib-Prog	1952	1958
Stan Roberts	Lib-Prog	1958	1961
	Lib	1961	1962
Albert Vielfaure	Lib	1962	1969
Leonard Barkman	Lib	1969	1973
Robert Banman	PC	1973	1986
Helmut Pankratz	PC	1986	1990
Ben Sveinson	PC	1990	1999
Ron Lemieux	NDP	1999	2011
Dennis Smook	PC	2011	2023
Konrad Narth	PC	2023	

== Election results ==
=== 2023 ===
2023 Manitoba general election
Party	Candidate	Votes	%	±%	Expenditures
Progressive Conservative	Konrad Narth	4,586	61.02	-11.77	$15,816.55
New Democratic	Bianca Siem	1,554	20.68	+5.34	$168.00
Keystone	Matthew Wiebe	736	9.79	–	$1,782.49
Liberal	Monica Guetre	640	8.52	-4.36	$4,912.37
Total valid votes/expense limit		7,516	99.47	+0.33	$54,396.00
Total rejected and declined ballots		40	0.53	–	
Turnout		7,556	55.54	+0.13	
Eligible voters		13,604			
Progressive Conservative hold		Swing		-9.06	
Source(s) Source: Elections Manitoba

=== 2019 ===
2019 Manitoba general election
Party	Candidate	Votes	%	±%	Expenditures
Progressive Conservative	Dennis Smook	5,310	72.79	+1.56	$13,774.87
New Democratic	Erin McGee	1,046	14.34	+6.7	$150.00
Liberal	Lorena Mitchell	939	12.87	+2.3	$2,425.53
Total valid votes		7,295	99.14	–	
Rejected		63	0.86		
Turnout		7,358	55.41		
Eligible voters		13,279			
Progressive Conservative hold		Swing		-6.3	
Source(s) Source: Manitoba. Chief Electoral Officer (2019). Statement of Votes for the 42nd Provincial General Election, September 10, 2019 (PDF) (Report). Winnipeg: Elections Manitoba.

=== 2016 ===
2016 provincial election redistributed results
Party	%
Progressive Conservative	78.6
Liberal	10.6
New Democratic	7.6
Green	3.2

2016 Manitoba general election
Party	Candidate	Votes	%	±%
Progressive Conservative	Dennis Smook	5,262	71.23	7.16
Green	Janine Gibson	724	9.80	5.02
New Democratic	Echo Asher	705	9.54	-16.59
Liberal	Bill Paulishyn	696	9.42	4.41
Total valid votes		7,387	–	–
Rejected		78	–	
Eligible voters / turnout		13,494	55.32	1.71
Source(s) Source: Manitoba. Chief Electoral Officer (2016). Statement of Votes for the 41st Provincial General Election, April 19, 2016 (PDF) (Report). Winnipeg: Elections Manitoba.

=== 2011 ===
2011 Manitoba general election
Party	Candidate	Votes	%	±%	Expenditures
Progressive Conservative	Dennis Smook	4,487	64.07	26.25	$20,489.51
New Democratic	Maurice Tallaire	1,830	26.13	-24.99	$11,908.18
Liberal	Monica Guetre	351	5.01	-1.22	$4,148.98
Green	Janine Gibson	335	4.78	–	$0.00
Total valid votes		7,003	–	–	
Rejected		30	–		
Eligible voters / turnout		13,119	53.61	-6.45	
Source(s) Source: Manitoba. Chief Electoral Officer (2011). Statement of Votes for the 40th Provincial General Election, October 4, 2011 (PDF) (Report). Winnipeg: Elections Manitoba.

=== 2007 ===
2007 Manitoba general election
Party	Candidate	Votes	%	±%	Expenditures
New Democratic	Ron Lemieux	4,018	51.12	−6.95	$34,191.10
Progressive Conservative	Bob Stefaniuk	2,973	37.82	+3.26	$27,029.65
Liberal	Roland Chaput	490	6.23	−1.13	$1,028.66
Independent	Jay Murray	379	4.82	+4.82	$2,616.77
Total valid votes		7,834	99.67		
Rejected and declined votes		26			
Turnout		7,860	60.07	+7.53	
Electors on the lists		13,129			
Source(s) Source: Manitoba. Chief Electoral Officer (2007). Statement of Votes for the 39th Provincial General Election, May 22, 2007 (PDF) (Report). Winnipeg: Elections Manitoba.

=== 2003 ===
2003 Manitoba general election
Party	Candidate	Votes	%	±%	Expenditures
New Democratic	Ron Lemieux	3,881	58.07	16.88	23,896.26
Progressive Conservative	Gerard Simard	2,310	34.57	-4.70	16,342.17
Liberal	Paula Ryplanski Marsch	492	7.36	-9.72	980.01
Total valid votes		6,683	–	–	
Rejected		29	–		
Eligible voters / turnout		12,775	52.54	-15.88	
Source(s) Source: Manitoba. Chief Electoral Officer (2003). Statement of Votes for the 38th Provincial General Election, June 3, 2003 (PDF) (Report). Winnipeg: Elections Manitoba.

=== 1999 ===
1999 Manitoba general election
Party	Candidate	Votes	%	±%	Expenditures
New Democratic	Ron Lemieux	3,533	41.20	15.49	$25,839.00
Progressive Conservative	Ben Sveinson	3,367	39.26	-8.76	$27,578.30
Liberal	Leon E. Morrissette	1,465	17.08	-9.20	$16,544.56
Manitoba	Bonnie Fedak	211	2.46	–	$1,880.50
Total valid votes		8,576	–	–	
Rejected		37	–		
Eligible voters / turnout		12,588	68.42	-1.29	
Source(s) Source: Manitoba. Chief Electoral Officer (1999). Statement of Votes for the 37th Provincial General Election, September 21, 1999 (PDF) (Report). Winnipeg: Elections Manitoba.

=== 1995 ===
1995 Manitoba general election
Party	Candidate	Votes	%	±%
Progressive Conservative	Ben Sveinson	4,581	48.02	3.53
Liberal	Marinus Van Osch	2,507	26.28	-6.13
New Democratic	Renald Fiola	2,452	25.70	2.60
Total valid votes		9,540	–	–
Rejected		45	–	
Eligible voters / turnout		13,749	69.71	3.03
Source(s) Source: Manitoba. Chief Electoral Officer (1999). Statement of Votes for the 37th Provincial General Election, September 21, 1999 (PDF) (Report). Winnipeg: Elections Manitoba.

=== 1990 ===
1990 Manitoba general election
Party	Candidate	Votes	%	±%
Progressive Conservative	Ben Sveinson	3,731	44.49	-10.00
Liberal	Claire Noel	2,718	32.41	-4.29
New Democratic	Ronald Fiola	1,938	23.11	14.29
Total valid votes		8,387	–	–
Rejected		26	–	
Eligible voters / turnout		12,617	66.68	6.90
Source(s) Source: Manitoba. Chief Electoral Officer (1999). Statement of Votes for the 37th Provincial General Election, September 21, 1999 (PDF) (Report). Winnipeg: Elections Manitoba.

=== 1988 ===
1988 Manitoba general election
Party	Candidate	Votes	%	±%
Progressive Conservative	Helmut Pankratz	4,377	54.49	-4.63
Liberal	Cornelius Goertzen	2,948	36.70	24.71
New Democratic	Walter McDowell	708	8.81	-20.08
Total valid votes		8,033	–	–
Rejected		14	–	
Eligible voters / turnout		13,462	59.78	9.36
Source(s) Source: Manitoba. Chief Electoral Officer (1999). Statement of Votes for the 37th Provincial General Election, September 21, 1999 (PDF) (Report). Winnipeg: Elections Manitoba.

=== 1986 ===
1986 Manitoba general election
Party	Candidate	Votes	%	±%
Progressive Conservative	Helmut Pankratz	3,618	59.12	-11.33
New Democratic	Walter McDowell	1,768	28.89	10.57
Liberal	Walter Hiebert	734	11.99	–
Total valid votes		6,120	–	–
Rejected		27	–	
Eligible voters / turnout		12,192	50.42	-7.84
Source(s) Source: Manitoba. Chief Electoral Officer (1999). Statement of Votes for the 37th Provincial General Election, September 21, 1999 (PDF) (Report). Winnipeg: Elections Manitoba.

=== 1981 ===
1981 Manitoba general election
Party	Candidate	Votes	%	±%
Progressive Conservative	Robert Banman	4,418	70.45	4.39
New Democratic	Jim Henry	1,149	18.32	-3.20
Progressive	Alphonse Fornier	704	11.23	–
Total valid votes		6,271	–	–
Rejected		18	–	
Eligible voters / turnout		10,795	58.26	-7.68
Source(s) Source: Manitoba. Chief Electoral Officer (1999). Statement of Votes for the 37th Provincial General Election, September 21, 1999 (PDF) (Report). Winnipeg: Elections Manitoba.

=== 1977 ===
1977 Manitoba general election
Party	Candidate	Votes	%	±%
Progressive Conservative	Robert Banman	4,914	66.06	23.32
New Democratic	Alphonse Fournier	1,601	21.52	-0.70
Liberal	Robert "Bob" Rempel	924	12.42	-22.61
Total valid votes		7,439	–	–
Rejected		18	–	
Eligible voters / turnout		11,309	65.94	-8.02
Source(s) Source: Manitoba. Chief Electoral Officer (1999). Statement of Votes for the 37th Provincial General Election, September 21, 1999 (PDF) (Report). Winnipeg: Elections Manitoba.

=== 1973 ===
1973 Manitoba general election
Party	Candidate	Votes	%	±%
Progressive Conservative	Robert Banman	2,912	42.74	14.37
Liberal	Leonard Barkman	2,387	35.04	-17.14
New Democratic	Roger Smith	1,514	22.22	2.76
Total valid votes		6,813	–	–
Rejected		33	–	
Eligible voters / turnout		9,256	73.96	23.29
Source(s) Source: Manitoba. Chief Electoral Officer (1999). Statement of Votes for the 37th Provincial General Election, September 21, 1999 (PDF) (Report). Winnipeg: Elections Manitoba.

=== 1969 ===
1969 Manitoba general election
Party	Candidate	Votes	%	±%
Liberal	Leonard Barkman	1,933	52.17	-15.58
Progressive Conservative	John Blatz	1,051	28.37	-3.88
New Democratic	Elmer Reimer	721	19.46	–
Total valid votes		3,705	–	–
Rejected		29	–	
Eligible voters / turnout		7,369	50.67	4.17
Source(s) Source: Manitoba. Chief Electoral Officer (1999). Statement of Votes for the 37th Provincial General Election, September 21, 1999 (PDF) (Report). Winnipeg: Elections Manitoba.

=== 1966 ===
1966 Manitoba general election
Party	Candidate	Votes	%	±%
Liberal	Albert Vielfaure	1,807	67.75	24.18
Progressive Conservative	Stan Bisson	860	32.25	-1.70
Total valid votes		2,667	–	–
Rejected		18	–	
Eligible voters / turnout		5,774	46.50	-11.37
Source(s) Source: Manitoba. Chief Electoral Officer (1999). Statement of Votes for the 37th Provincial General Election, September 21, 1999 (PDF) (Report). Winnipeg: Elections Manitoba.

=== 1962 ===
1962 Manitoba general election
Party	Candidate	Votes	%	±%
Liberal	Albert Vielfaure	1,394	43.58	–
Progressive Conservative	J. Rene Prefontaine	1,086	33.95	-12.83
Social Credit	Raymond Thuot	719	22.48	–
Total valid votes		3,199	–	–
Rejected		56	–	
Eligible voters / turnout		5,625	57.87	-5.34
Source(s) Source: Manitoba. Chief Electoral Officer (1999). Statement of Votes for the 37th Provincial General Election, September 21, 1999 (PDF) (Report). Winnipeg: Elections Manitoba.

=== 1959 ===
1959 Manitoba general election
Party	Candidate	Votes	%	±%
Liberal–Progressive	Stan Roberts	1,799	53.22	0.35
Progressive Conservative	Edmund Guertin	1,581	46.78	-0.35
Total valid votes		3,380	–	–
Rejected		21	–	
Eligible voters / turnout		5,381	63.20	6.94
Source(s) Source: Manitoba. Chief Electoral Officer (1999). Statement of Votes for the 37th Provincial General Election, September 21, 1999 (PDF) (Report). Winnipeg: Elections Manitoba.

=== 1958 ===
1958 Manitoba general election
Party	Candidate	Votes	%	±%
Liberal–Progressive	Stan Roberts	1,565	52.87	-5.42
Progressive Conservative	Stan Bisson	1,395	47.13	–
Total valid votes		2,960	–	–
Rejected		15	–	
Eligible voters / turnout		5,288	56.26	-6.67
Source(s) Source: Manitoba. Chief Electoral Officer (1999). Statement of Votes for the 37th Provincial General Election, September 21, 1999 (PDF) (Report). Winnipeg: Elections Manitoba.

=== 1953 ===
1953 Manitoba general election
Party	Candidate	Votes	%	±%
Liberal–Progressive	Edmond Brodeur	2,203	58.30	–
Social Credit	Damase Dufresne	1,576	41.70	–
Total valid votes		3,779	–	–
Rejected		53	–	
Eligible voters / turnout		6,089	62.93	–
Source(s) Source: Manitoba. Chief Electoral Officer (1999). Statement of Votes for the 37th Provincial General Election, September 21, 1999 (PDF) (Report). Winnipeg: Elections Manitoba.

=== 1952 by-election ===
Manitoba provincial by-election, 1952
Party	Candidate	Votes	%	±%
Liberal	Edmond Brodeur	2,334	63.13	–
Conservative	Eugene Joseph Raphael Arpin	1,363	36.87	–
Total valid votes		3,697	–	–
Rejected		N/A	–	
Eligible voters / turnout		N/A	–	–
Source(s) Source: Manitoba. Chief Electoral Officer (1999). Statement of Votes for the 37th Provincial General Election, September 21, 1999 (PDF) (Report). Winnipeg: Elections Manitoba.

=== 1949 ===
1949 Manitoba general election
Party	Candidate	Votes	%	±%
Liberal–Progressive	Sauveur Marcoux	1,901	55.44	-13.74
Independent	E. J. Raphael Arpin	1,528	44.56	–
Total valid votes		3,429	–	–
Rejected		40	–	
Eligible voters / turnout		5,991	57.90	3.96
Source(s) Source: Manitoba. Chief Electoral Officer (1999). Statement of Votes for the 37th Provincial General Election, September 21, 1999 (PDF) (Report). Winnipeg: Elections Manitoba.

=== 1945 ===
1945 Manitoba general election
Party	Candidate	Votes	%	±%
Liberal–Progressive	Sauveur Marcoux	1,620	45.85	-8.04
Social Credit	Paul Prince	1,089	30.82	-8.34
Liberal–Progressive	Alfred Lagimodiere	824	23.32	-30.57
Total valid votes		3,533	–	–
Rejected		50	–	
Eligible voters / turnout		6,642	53.94	5.75
Source(s) Source: Manitoba. Chief Electoral Officer (1999). Statement of Votes for the 37th Provincial General Election, September 21, 1999 (PDF) (Report). Winnipeg: Elections Manitoba.

=== 1941 ===
1941 Manitoba general election
Party	Candidate	Votes	%	±%
Liberal–Progressive	Sauveur Marcoux	1,793	53.89	-0.62
Social Credit	Antonio Lemoine	1,303	39.16	27.71
Conservative	J. H. Graham	231	6.94	-27.09
Total valid votes		3,327	–	–
Rejected		42	–	
Eligible voters / turnout		6,990	48.20	-16.72
Source(s) Source: Manitoba. Chief Electoral Officer (1999). Statement of Votes for the 37th Provincial General Election, September 21, 1999 (PDF) (Report). Winnipeg: Elections Manitoba.

=== 1936 ===
1936 Manitoba general election
Party	Candidate	Votes	%	±%
Liberal–Progressive	Sauveur Marcoux	2,209	54.52	8.37
Conservative	Joseph Hamelin	1,379	34.03	-9.95
Social Credit	A. G. Gobert	464	11.45	–
Total valid votes		4,052	–	–
Rejected		52	–	
Eligible voters / turnout		6,322	64.92	-3.26
Source(s) Source: Manitoba. Chief Electoral Officer (1999). Statement of Votes for the 37th Provincial General Election, September 21, 1999 (PDF) (Report). Winnipeg: Elections Manitoba.

=== 1932 ===
1932 Manitoba general election
Party	Candidate	Votes	%	±%
Liberal–Progressive	Philippe Adjutor Talbot	1,627	46.14	-5.12
Conservative	E. J. R. Arpin	1,551	43.99	22.99
Independent	Allan Ramsay	348	9.87	–
Total valid votes		3,526	–	–
Rejected		N/A	–	
Eligible voters / turnout		5,172	68.17	16.59
Source(s) Source: Manitoba. Chief Electoral Officer (1999). Statement of Votes for the 37th Provincial General Election, September 21, 1999 (PDF) (Report). Winnipeg: Elections Manitoba.

=== 1927 ===
1927 Manitoba general election
Party	Candidate	Votes	%	±%
Progressive	Philippe Adjutor Talbot	1,074	51.26	-10.78
Liberal	J. Napoleon Landry	581	27.73	-10.23
Conservative	Dr. Paul Royal	440	21.00	–
Total valid votes		2,095	–	–
Rejected		N/A	–	
Eligible voters / turnout		4,061	51.59	-4.02
Source(s) Source: Manitoba. Chief Electoral Officer (1999). Statement of Votes for the 37th Provincial General Election, September 21, 1999 (PDF) (Report). Winnipeg: Elections Manitoba.

=== 1922 ===
1922 Manitoba general election
Party	Candidate	Votes	%	±%
United Farmers	Philippe Adjutor Talbot	1,134	62.04	2.98
Liberal	Louis Philippe Roy	694	37.96	–
Total valid votes		1,828	–	–
Rejected		N/A	–	
Eligible voters / turnout		3,287	55.61	-0.99
Source(s) Source: Manitoba. Chief Electoral Officer (1999). Statement of Votes for the 37th Provincial General Election, September 21, 1999 (PDF) (Report). Winnipeg: Elections Manitoba.

=== 1920 ===
1920 Manitoba general election
Party	Candidate	Votes	%	±%
Independent	Philippe Adjutor Talbot	1,023	59.06	2.96
Farmer	L. R. Magnum	709	40.94	–
Total valid votes		1,732	–	–
Rejected		N/A	–	
Eligible voters / turnout		3,060	56.60	-18.47
Source(s) Source: Manitoba. Chief Electoral Officer (1999). Statement of Votes for the 37th Provincial General Election, September 21, 1999 (PDF) (Report). Winnipeg: Elections Manitoba.

=== 1915 ===
1915 Manitoba general election
Party	Candidate	Votes	%	±%
Liberal	Philippe Adjutor Talbot	713	56.10	14.68
Conservative	Jean-Baptiste Lauzon	558	43.90	-14.68
Total valid votes		1,271	–	–
Rejected		N/A	–	
Eligible voters / turnout		1,693	75.07	-8.08
Source(s) Source: Manitoba. Chief Electoral Officer (1999). Statement of Votes for the 37th Provincial General Election, September 21, 1999 (PDF) (Report). Winnipeg: Elections Manitoba.

=== 1914 ===
1914 Manitoba general election
Party	Candidate	Votes	%	±%
Conservative	Jean-Baptiste Lauzon	778	58.58	8.99
Liberal	Philippe Adjutor Talbot	550	41.42	-8.99
Total valid votes		1,328	–	–
Rejected		N/A	–	
Eligible voters / turnout		1,597	83.16	-3.74
Source(s) Source: Manitoba. Chief Electoral Officer (1999). Statement of Votes for the 37th Provincial General Election, September 21, 1999 (PDF) (Report). Winnipeg: Elections Manitoba.

=== 1910 ===
1910 Manitoba general election
Party	Candidate	Votes	%	±%
Liberal	William Molloy	438	50.40	2.05
Conservative	Jean-Baptiste Lauzon	431	49.60	-2.05
Total valid votes		869	–	–
Rejected		N/A	–	
Eligible voters / turnout		1,000	86.90	8.27
Source(s) Source: Manitoba. Chief Electoral Officer (1999). Statement of Votes for the 37th Provincial General Election, September 21, 1999 (PDF) (Report). Winnipeg: Elections Manitoba.

=== 1907 ===
1907 Manitoba general election
Party	Candidate	Votes	%	±%
Conservative	Jean-Baptiste Lauzon	361	51.65	2.45
Liberal	William Lagimodière	338	48.35	-2.45
Total valid votes		699	–	–
Rejected		N/A	–	
Eligible voters / turnout		889	78.63	-9.42
Source(s) Source: Manitoba. Chief Electoral Officer (1999). Statement of Votes for the 37th Provincial General Election, September 21, 1999 (PDF) (Report). Winnipeg: Elections Manitoba.

=== 1903 ===
1903 Manitoba general election
Party	Candidate	Votes	%	±%
Liberal	William Lagimodière	348	50.80	-5.51
Conservative	Jean-Baptiste Lauzon	337	49.20	5.51
Total valid votes		685	–	–
Rejected		N/A	–	
Eligible voters / turnout		778	88.05	19.75
Source(s) Source: Manitoba. Chief Electoral Officer (1999). Statement of Votes for the 37th Provincial General Election, September 21, 1999 (PDF) (Report). Winnipeg: Elections Manitoba.

=== 1899 ===
1899 Manitoba general election
Party	Candidate	Votes	%	±%
Liberal	William Lagimodière	370	56.32	10.09
Conservative	Théophile Paré	287	43.68	-10.09
Total valid votes		657	–	–
Rejected		N/A	–	
Eligible voters / turnout		962	68.30	5.16
Source(s) Source: Manitoba. Chief Electoral Officer (1999). Statement of Votes for the 37th Provincial General Election, September 21, 1999 (PDF) (Report). Winnipeg: Elections Manitoba.

=== 1896 ===
1896 Manitoba general election
Party	Candidate	Votes	%	±%
Conservative	Théophile Paré	292	53.78	0.68
Liberal	William Lagimodière	251	46.22	-0.68
Total valid votes		543	–	–
Rejected		N/A	–	
Eligible voters / turnout		860	63.14	12.62
Source(s) Source: Manitoba. Chief Electoral Officer (1999). Statement of Votes for the 37th Provincial General Election, September 21, 1999 (PDF) (Report). Winnipeg: Elections Manitoba.

=== 1892 ===
1892 Manitoba general election
Party	Candidate	Votes	%	±%
Conservative	Théophile Paré	257	53.10	10.38
Liberal	William Lagimodière	227	46.90	-10.38
Total valid votes		484	–	–
Rejected		N/A	–	
Eligible voters / turnout		958	50.52	–
Source(s) Source: Manitoba. Chief Electoral Officer (1999). Statement of Votes for the 37th Provincial General Election, September 21, 1999 (PDF) (Report). Winnipeg: Elections Manitoba.

=== 1888 ===
1888 Manitoba general election
Party	Candidate	Votes	%	±%
Liberal	William Lagimodière	240	57.28	–
Conservative	L. G. Gagnon	179	42.72	-31.21
Total valid votes		419	–	–
Rejected		N/A	–	
Eligible voters / turnout		N/A	–	–
Source(s) Source: Manitoba. Chief Electoral Officer (1999). Statement of Votes for the 37th Provincial General Election, September 21, 1999 (PDF) (Report). Winnipeg: Elections Manitoba.

=== 1888 by-election ===
Manitoba provincial by-election, 1888
Party	Candidate	Votes	%	±%
Conservative	James Prendergast	207	73.93	27.06
Unknown	J. A. Nolin	73	26.07	–
Total valid votes		280	–	–
Rejected		N/A	–	
Eligible voters / turnout		N/A	–	–
Source(s) Source: Manitoba. Chief Electoral Officer (1999). Statement of Votes for the 37th Provincial General Election, September 21, 1999 (PDF) (Report). Winnipeg: Elections Manitoba.

=== 1886 ===
1886 Manitoba general election
Party	Candidate	Votes	%	±%
Conservative	James Prendergast	208	52.13	–
Liberal	L. G. Gagnon	191	47.87	–
Total valid votes		399	–	–
Rejected		N/A	–	
Eligible voters / turnout		715	55.80	–
Source(s) Source: Manitoba. Chief Electoral Officer (1999). Statement of Votes for the 37th Provincial General Election, September 21, 1999 (PDF) (Report). Winnipeg: Elections Manitoba.

=== 1885 by-election ===
Manitoba provincial by-election, 1885
Party	Candidate	Votes	%	±%
Conservative	James Prendergast	Acclaimed	–	–
Total valid votes			–	–
Rejected		N/A	–	
Eligible voters / turnout		N/A	–	–
Source(s) Source: Manitoba. Chief Electoral Officer (1999). Statement of Votes for the 37th Provincial General Election, September 21, 1999 (PDF) (Report). Winnipeg: Elections Manitoba.

=== 1884 by-election ===
Manitoba provincial by-election, 1884
Party	Candidate	Votes	%	±%
Conservative	Louis Arthur Prud'homme	300	66.96	18.09
Liberal	J. W. Owens	148	33.04	–
Total valid votes		448	–	–
Rejected		N/A	–	
Eligible voters / turnout		N/A	–	–
Source(s) Source: Manitoba. Chief Electoral Officer (1999). Statement of Votes for the 37th Provincial General Election, September 21, 1999 (PDF) (Report). Winnipeg: Elections Manitoba.

=== 1883 ===
1883 Manitoba general election
Party	Candidate	Votes	%	±%
Independent	Maxime Goulet	181	51.13	–
Conservative	Louis Arthur Prud'homme	173	48.87	–
Total valid votes		354	–	–
Rejected		N/A	–	
Eligible voters / turnout		N/A	–	–
Source(s) Source: Manitoba. Chief Electoral Officer (1999). Statement of Votes for the 37th Provincial General Election, September 21, 1999 (PDF) (Report). Winnipeg: Elections Manitoba.

=== 1882 by-election ===
Manitoba provincial by-election, 1882
Party	Candidate	Votes	%	±%
Conservative	Louis Arthur Prud'homme	Acclaimed	–	–
Total valid votes			–	–
Rejected		N/A	–	
Eligible voters / turnout		N/A	–	–
Source(s) Source: Manitoba. Chief Electoral Officer (1999). Statement of Votes for the 37th Provincial General Election, September 21, 1999 (PDF) (Report). Winnipeg: Elections Manitoba.

=== 1880 by-election ===
Manitoba provincial by-election, 1880
Party	Candidate	Votes	%	±%
Liberal–Conservative	Maxime Goulet	Acclaimed	–	–
Total valid votes			–	–
Rejected		N/A	–	
Eligible voters / turnout		N/A	–	–
Source(s) Source: Manitoba. Chief Electoral Officer (1999). Statement of Votes for the 37th Provincial General Election, September 21, 1999 (PDF) (Report). Winnipeg: Elections Manitoba.

=== 1879 ===
1879 Manitoba general election
Party	Candidate	Votes	%
Liberal–Conservative	Maxime Goulet	219	55.44
Undeclared	J. Desautels	176	44.56
Total valid votes		395	–
Rejected		N/A	–
Eligible voters / turnout		N/A	–
Source(s) Source: Manitoba. Chief Electoral Officer (1999). Statement of Votes for the 37th Provincial General Election, September 21, 1999 (PDF) (Report). Winnipeg: Elections Manitoba.

== Previous boundaries ==
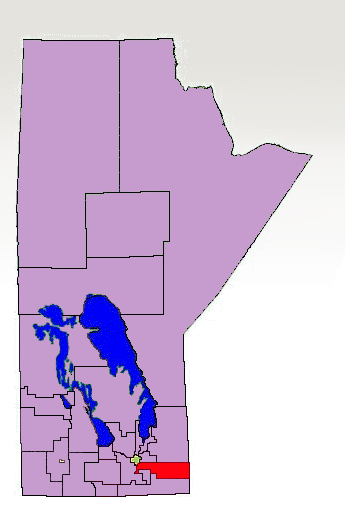
Boundaries of La Verendrye in 1997, highlighted in red

== See also ==
- List of Manitoba provincial electoral districts
- Canadian provincial electoral districts
