= William Winram =

Canadian politician

William James Winram

Member of the Legislative Assembly of Manitoba
- In office December 16, 1879 – 1891

8th Speaker of the Legislative Assembly of Manitoba
- In office August 28, 1888 – February 25, 1891
- Preceded by: David Glass
- Succeeded by: Samuel Jackson

Personal details
- Born: January 8, 1838 Douglas, Isle of Man
- Died: February 12, 1891 (aged 53) Manitou, Manitoba, Canada
- Party: Liberal

William James Winram (January 8, 1838 – February 12, 1891) was a Canadian politician in the province of Manitoba.

Born in Douglas, Isle of Man, as one of a set of twins, the son of James Winram, a shipbuilder, and Annie Hartley, who lived in Ulverston, England, but often traveled back and forth between Liverpool and the Isle of Man, as they had built the ferry which ran between these two ports. Winram was educated at Liverpool Collegiate Institute. He worked for his father as a mechanical engineer until emigrating to Canada and settling in the County of Simcoe, Ontario. In 1878, he moved to Manitoba, where he was a farmer in the Pembina Mountain district.

He was acclaimed to the Legislative Assembly of Manitoba as the Liberal candidate for the electoral district of Dufferin South in 1879 and was re-elected in 1883 and 1886, and then was acclaimed for Manitou in 1888. From August 28, 1888, to February 12, 1891, he was the Speaker of the Legislative Assembly of Manitoba.

Winram was married twice: first to Catherine Ingersoll in 1863 and then to Mary Bannerman in 1863 following his first wife's death.

There still exists a church, St. Mary St. Alban Anglican Church and Cemetery, also known as the Winram Memorial Church, in the Rural District of Pembina, Manitoba, which was erected in his memory.
