= Maxime Goulet =

Canadian politician (1855–1932)

Maxime Goulet

Maxime Goulet (January 28, 1855 – January 17, 1932) was a Canadian politician. He served as a member of the Legislative Assembly of Manitoba from 1878 to 1886 and was the Minister of Agriculture under Conservative Premier John Norquay.

== Life ==
Goulet was born in Saint Boniface, Rupert's Land in 1855. His father was Alexis Goulet, a St. Boniface resident of Métis heritage; his mother Josephte was the daughter of John Siveright, a Scots factor for the Hudson's Bay Company. He was elected in the 1878 general election as a member of the French Party for the riding of St. Vital. He then ran in the riding of La Verendrye as an independent conservative, winning in the 1879 and 1883 elections. He served as Minister of Agriculture from 7 January 1880 to 16 November 1881. He left office as a legislator in 1886. In 1889, Maxime appeared in the Buffalo Bill Cody Wild West Show at the Exposition Universelle (Paris World's Fair). He was accompanied at this event by Ambroise Lépine, his brother Maxime Lépine, Michel Dumas and Jules Marion, all Red River Metis.

Maxime Goulet was a younger brother of the Métis martyr Elzéar Goulet, who was killed for his part in the rebellion of Louis Riel.

He married Elise Genthon, daughter of Joseph Genthon of St. Boniface, on 1 July 1873. The couple had 14 children.

In later years, Goulet worked in the land department of the Canadian federal government. He died January 17, 1932, at his home in Winnipeg.

Goulet Street in central St. Boniface is named for Maxime Goulet.
