= Charles Hay (politician) =

Canadian politician

Charles Hay (October 28, 1843 – November 14, 1924) was a Scottish-Canadian merchant and political figure in Manitoba, Canada. He represented Norfolk from 1883 to 1886 in the Legislative Assembly of Manitoba as a Liberal.

He was born on Flotta, Orkney, the sixth child of James Hay, Flotta's Society school teacher for 45 years, and Barbara Simpson, midwife.

Charles came to North America with the Hudson's Bay Company, but quit before its term was up. He came to Portage la Prairie, Rupert's Land in 1862. In 1869, Hay married Annie Munro Wild. He was postmaster at Portage la Prairie and served on the council for the Rural Municipality of Portage la Prairie. Hay was also a justice of the peace. He was a member of the firm Campbell, Hay and Boddy.

Around 1914, Hay retired to Vancouver, British Columbia, where he died at the age of 81.
