= Helmut Pankratz =

Canadian politician (born 1937)

Helmut Pankratz (born October 10, 1937) is a retired Canadian politician from Manitoba. Pankratz served as mayor of Steinbach from 1981 to 1986. From 1986 to 1990, he represented the electoral district of La Verendrye for the Progressive Conservative Party in the Legislative Assembly of Manitoba.

He was born to a Mennonite family in Winnipeg. His parents were Henry and Justina Pankratz. Before entering politics, he worked as a farmer. On August 24, 1961, he married Dolores Jean and had two children with her: Kevin Blair and Jillayne Fay.

Pankratz was first elected to the Manitoba legislature in the provincial election of 1986, defeating Walter McDowell of the NDP by almost 2,000 votes. In the 1988 election, he defeated Liberal C.E. Goertzen by over 1,400 votes as the Progressive Conservatives formed a minority government under Gary Filmon.

Pankratz was not appointed to cabinet, but served as Chairman of the Standing Committee on Economic Development. He retired from the legislature at the calling of the 1990 provincial election, and has not returned to political life since this time. He now owns a recreational vehicle dealership in the Steinbach area.
