= Edward Fairbanks =

Canadian politician

Edward Lewis Fairbanks (1850 – September 14, 1924) was a merchant and political figure in Manitoba. He represented Baie St. Paul from 1883 to 1886 in the Legislative Assembly of Manitoba as a Conservative.

He was born in Belle-Riviere, Canada East and was educated at the Carillon Academy. Fairbanks was postmaster at Baie St. Paul, Manitoba from 1878 to 1883. He served as warden for the rural municipality of Belcourt (dissolved in 1890). He was a member of the Board of Agriculture and Statistics for Manitoba. A few years after leaving politics, Fairbanks moved to Ottawa. He died there in 1924.
