= William Crawford (Canadian politician) =

Canadian politician

William Crawford (August 28, 1847 – 1897) was a land surveyor, farmer and political figure in Manitoba. He represented High Bluff and Poplar Point from 1883 to 1886 in the Legislative Assembly of Manitoba as a Conservative.

He was born in South Leeds, Canada West, the son of John Crawford. Crawford came to Manitoba in 1871 as an assistant surveyor. In 1875, he became a Dominion Lands Surveyor. He was hired in 1877 by the federal government as a valuator of the Canadian Pacific Railway right-of-way. Crawford was an unsuccessful candidate for a seat in the Manitoba assembly in 1879 before being elected in 1883. He also served as Swamp Lands Commissioner for Manitoba.

He later farmed in the Dauphin area. Crawford established a sawmill in partnership with David Howard Harrison. He was a prominent member of the Masons. Crawford died in Dauphin.
