= Edward Gigot =

Canadian politician

Edward Francis Gigot (/dʒiːˈɡoʊ/; May 30, 1847 – December 3, 1928) was a German-born merchant and political figure in Manitoba. He represented St. Francois Xavier from 1883 to 1886 in the Legislative Assembly of Manitoba as a Liberal.

He was born in Mayence, the son of Nicholas Gigot and Josephine von Kirckesh, and was educated at Jacoby's College. Gigot came to Canada in 1864 and was employed in railway construction until 1873. He came to the Red River Settlement around 1871. In 1873, Gigot joined the Hudson's Bay Company. He worked three years at White Horse Plains and then was transferred to Portage la Prairie. He left the Hudson's Bay Company in 1882 and then joined again in 1885, working at Fort Macleod, then part of the Northwest Territories, and then at Nelson, British Columbia. In Nelson, he was president of the Kootenay Lake Hospital Society and secretary of the Nelson Board of Trade and the Retail Merchants Society.

Gigot married Rosina Ness and had six children.

He retired in 1915 and later died in Nelson at the age of 81.
