= Joseph E. Woodworth =

Canadian politician

Representative for Brandon in Legislative Assembly of Manitoba
- In office 1883–1886

Personal details
- Born: 1837 Kings County, Nova Scotia
- Died: 1889 (aged 51–52) Georgia, USA
- Party: Conservative
- Profession: merchant

Joseph E. Woodworth (1837-1889) was a ship builder, merchant, and member of the Woodworth political family.

== Life ==
Joseph was born in 1837 in Nova Scotia, the son of Benjamin B. Woodworth, a Justice of the Peace and important business figure in Kings County. He was the brother of Douglas Benjamin Woodworth.

He was educated in Kings County, and began a career as a shipbuilder, constructing the largest vessels in the county at that time. Woodworth eventually moved west, becoming a pioneer of Manitoba after settling in Brandon. There he began a career as a merchant and real-estate broker.

In 1883, he was elected to the Legislative Assembly of Manitoba, representing Brandon in the 5th Legislature. He won that election with 57% of the vote.

== Marriage and children ==
Joseph married Nancy Cox, daughter of Joseph Cox and Mary Bigelow, and had two children:

- Abel Woodworth, who became a lawyer in New York City
- Benjamin F. Woodworth, who moved to New York City

== Namesake ==
The rural municipality of Woodworth is named after Joseph.
