= William Wagner (land surveyor) =

Canadian surveyor and politician

William Wagner (13 September 1820 – 25 February 1901) was a Polish born immigrant to Canada who became a certified land surveyor after he reached the country. In 1860, he was appointed immigration commissioner and sent to Germany, where he stayed until 1863 promoting immigration to the Canadas.

Wagner accomplished important survey work and wrote about Manitoba, the province which became his home, with accuracy and insight. He represented Woodlands from 1883 to 1886 in the Legislative Assembly of Manitoba as a Conservative.
