= Louis Arthur Prud'homme =

Canadian politician

Louis Arthur Prud'homme (November 21, 1853 – March 1, 1941) was a lawyer, judge, historian and political figure in Manitoba. He represented La Verendrye from 1882 to 1883 and from 1884 to 1885 in the Legislative Assembly of Manitoba as a Conservative.

He was born in St. Urbain, Canada East, the son of Lieutenant-Colonel J. M. Prud’Homme and Marguerite D’Amour. Prud'homme studied law and was called to the Quebec bar in 1879 and the Manitoba bar in 1881. In 1880, he married Appoline C. Henault. Prud'homme served as a captain in the St. Boniface Infantry Company. He was president of the Saint-Jean-Baptiste Society of Manitoba and of the St. Vincent de Paul Society. Prud'homme was elected to the provincial assembly in an 1882 by-election held after Maxime Goulet was named registrar. He was defeated by Goulet when he ran for reelection in 1883 and then was again elected to the assembly in an 1884 by-election held after Goulet was unseated. He resigned his seat in the Manitoba assembly in 1885 after he was named a county court judge for St. Boniface County.

Prud'homme was editor of L'Avenir de Beauharnois from 1875 to 1877 and contributed articles to La Revue Canadienne, L'Opinion publique and La Nouvelle. He wrote The History of Manitoba and Northwest Territories. Notes Historiques sur la vie de Pierre Radisson, published in 1891, and Le premier parlement de Manitoba, 1870-1874, published in 1923.

Prud'homme died at home in St. Boniface at the age of 87.
