= Francis Wesley Lipsett =

Canadian politician

Francis Wesley Lipsett (October 25, 1850 – October 27, 1889) was a veterinarian and political figure in Manitoba, Canada. He represented Woodlands from 1879 to 1883 in the Legislative Assembly of Manitoba as a Liberal-Conservative.

He was the son of Robert Lipsett and Caroline Campbell and was educated at the Toronto Veterinary College. Lipsett practised in Woodlands, Manitoba and then in Portage la Prairie. He was defeated when he ran for reelection in 1883. He was an investor in the Portage la Prairie Street Railway Company.
