= Edward Leacock =

Canadian politician

Edward Philip "EP" Leacock (December 28, 1853 – 1927) was an English-born confidence man, real estate speculator and political figure in Manitoba. He represented Birtle from 1882 to 1886 and Russell from 1886 to 1888 in the Legislative Assembly of Manitoba as a Conservative.

He was born on the Isle of Wight and was the uncle of humorist Stephen Leacock. He was the subject of his nephew's 1942 essay My Remarkable Uncle. Leacock came to Canada in 1878 and arrived in Winnipeg the following year. In 1881, he married Georgina Eliza Vickers.

Leacock ran unsuccessfully for a seat in the Manitoba assembly in 1879 and then was elected in an 1882 by-election held after Stephen Clement was named sheriff. He was reelected in 1883 and 1886. Leacock was defeated when he ran for reelection to the assembly in 1888.

He retired to England in 1894, where he was known as "Colonel Leacock", a retired Northwest Mounted Police colonel.
