= Isaiah Mawhinney =

Canadian politician

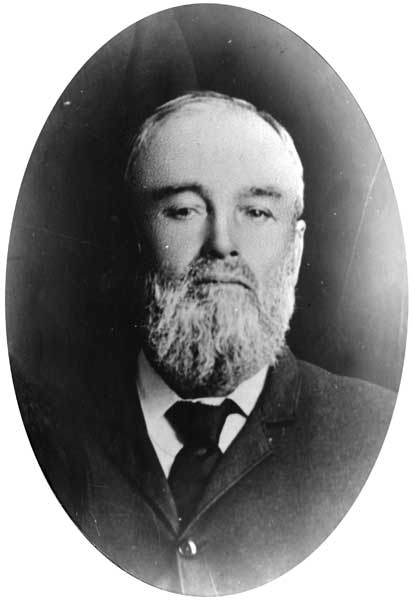
Isaiah Mawhinney

Isaiah Mawhinney (12 December 1830 – 26 January 1913) was an Irish-born political figure in Manitoba. He represented Burnside from 1883 to 1886 in the Legislative Assembly of Manitoba as a Conservative.

He was born in County Monaghan and was educated there. In 1850, he married Elizabeth Rutledge. Mawhinney came to Manitoba in 1873. In 1885, he was elected Provincial Grand Master for the Orange Order. Mawhinney was defeated by Kenneth McKenzie when he ran for reelection in 1886. He died at Victoria, British Columbia in 1913.
