= John Hedley Bell =

Canadian politician

John Hedley Bell (September 6, 1840 – March 16, 1897) was a merchant and political figure in Manitoba. He represented Springfield from 1883 to 1886 as a Liberal.

He was born in London Township, Upper Canada and was educated there. He trained for a career in business and for many years taught at the London Commercial College. Bell married Margaret Scott in 1862. The family came to Manitoba in 1871, settling in Kildonan. Bell worked as a bookkeeper and was a member of the municipal council. In 1883, he was warden for Kildonan County. After leaving politics, Bell served as assistant to the clerk for the Manitoba assembly. He was a prominent member of the Masons.
