= Leonard Barkman =

Canadian politician

- Born: Leonard A. Barkman; July 12, 1920; Steinbach, Manitoba, Canada
- Died: January 5, 1979 (aged 58); Steinbach, Manitoba, Canada
- Occupation: politician
- Years active: 1962–1973
- Known for: member, Manitoba legislature
- Political party: Liberal Party
- Spouse: Agnes Reimer (m. 1945)
- Parents: Jacob F. Barkman (father); Margaret Dueck (mother)

Leonard A. Barkman (July 12, 1920 – January 5, 1979) was a politician in Manitoba, Canada. He was a member of the Manitoba legislature from 1962 to 1973, sitting as a member of the Liberal Party. He was the first Mennonite elected to the Manitoba assembly from an area formerly known as the East Reserve, which had at one time been set aside by the federal government for settlement by Mennonite immigrants.

== Biography ==
Leonard A. Barkman was born July 12, 1920, in Steinbach, Manitoba, the son of Jacob F. Barkman and Margaret Dueck, both natives of Manitoba. Barkman was educated in Steinbach-area schools, operated a small business in the city and married Agnes Reimer in 1945 (she died May 2, 2002). He also served as mayor of Steinbach for a number of years.

He was first elected to the Manitoba legislature in the election of 1962, defeating Progressive Conservative Peter Thiessen by over 800 votes in the riding of Carillon. He was re-elected by an expanded margin in the 1966 election. In the 1969 election, he was re-elected in the redistributed riding of La Verendrye.

Support for the Manitoba Liberal Party declined in the 1970s, and Barkman was defeated by Progressive Conservative Robert Banman by 525 votes in the provincial election of 1973. He did not seek a return to the legislature after this time.

He died in Steinbach at the age of 58.

== Legacy ==
A public park located in the western portion of the city of Steinbach is named after L.A. Barkman. A plaque in honour of Barkman—near the southeast corner of the park—reads, "L.A. Barkman (1920-1979); Councillor 1952-1958; Mayor 1958-1970; MLA 1962-1973. A life dedicated to public service." L.A. Barkman Park contains a famous landmark known as "Abe's Hill," which serves as an ideal toboggan hill in the winter months.

This park recently became the subject of a controversy, regarding its use as a purely recreational park. In 1973, when the land was sold to the then "town" of Steinbach, the mayor at the time, A.D. Penner, had agreed verbally that the entire resulting park would remain strictly recreational. In Dec. 2008, however, the city council decided to proceed with the residential development of a two-acre strip of land along the northern boundary of L.A. Barkman Park, fronting the extension of Woodhaven Ave., against the wishes of the original owner of the property, Justice Gordon J. Barkman, who had formerly served as a justice on Manitoba's Court of Queen's Bench (1972–2001). Ultimately, due to a lack of response to the Request for Proposals, Council voted not to proceed with this development. Rezoning of land just outside the park, at the west end of Woodhaven Ave., was approved by the Manitoba Municipal Board, which allowed for the future development of a 5-storey, 128 unit apartment/condominium complex.

== Electoral results ==
1969 Manitoba general election: La Verendrye
Party	Candidate	Votes	%	±%
Liberal	Leonard Barkman	1,933	52.17	-15.58
Progressive Conservative	John Blatz	1,051	28.37	-3.88
New Democratic	Elmer Reimer	721	19.46	–
Total valid votes		3,705	–	–
Rejected		29	–	
Eligible voters / turnout		7,369	50.67	4.17
Source(s) Source: Manitoba. Chief Electoral Officer (1999). Statement of Votes for the 37th Provincial General Election, September 21, 1999 (PDF) (Report). Winnipeg: Elections Manitoba.

1966 Manitoba general election: Carillon
Party	Candidate	Votes	%	±%
Liberal	Leonard Barkman	2,352	63.83	
Progressive Conservative	John Blatz	1,217	33.03	
New Democratic	Elmer Reimer	116	3.12	
Total valid votes		3,685	100.00	
Rejected and discarded votes		59		
Turnout		3,744	59.84	
Electors on the lists		6,257		
