= Stephen Clement (Manitoba sheriff) =

Canadian politician

Stephen Clement (December 30, 1831 – November 22, 1901) was a political figure in Manitoba, Canada. He represented the electoral district of Birtle from 1881 to 1882 in the Legislative Assembly of Manitoba.

He was born in Upper Canada and came to Manitoba in 1880. He married Eleanor Dixon. Clement was elected to the Manitoba assembly in an 1881 by-election held after the western boundary of Manitoba was extended. He resigned his seat after being named sheriff for the Western judicial district in 1882. Clement held that post until his death in 1901. He also served on the Brandon school board.

His son Stephen also served in the provincial assembly.
