= Alexander Kittson =

Canadian politician

Alexander Kittson (February 26, 1853 – April 27, 1883) was a political figure in Manitoba. He represented Ste. Agathe from 1879 to 1883 in the Legislative Assembly of Manitoba as a Liberal-Conservative.

He was born in North Pembina, Rupert's Land, the son of Norman Kittson and Elise Marion, and was educated at St. Boniface College. In 1875, he married Elise Gingras. Kittson died in office of smallpox at St. Boniface.

His daughter Annie Jane married Horace Chevrier.

His former home in St. Boniface, known as the Maison Kittson, is recognized as a heritage landmark by the city of Winnipeg.
