= 1879 Manitoba general election =

- December 16, 1879

The 1879 Manitoba general election and was held on 16 December 1879. It is the province's fourth general election. Balloting in 1879 was vocal.
