= Intelligence services in Canada =

Canadian Government intelligence services

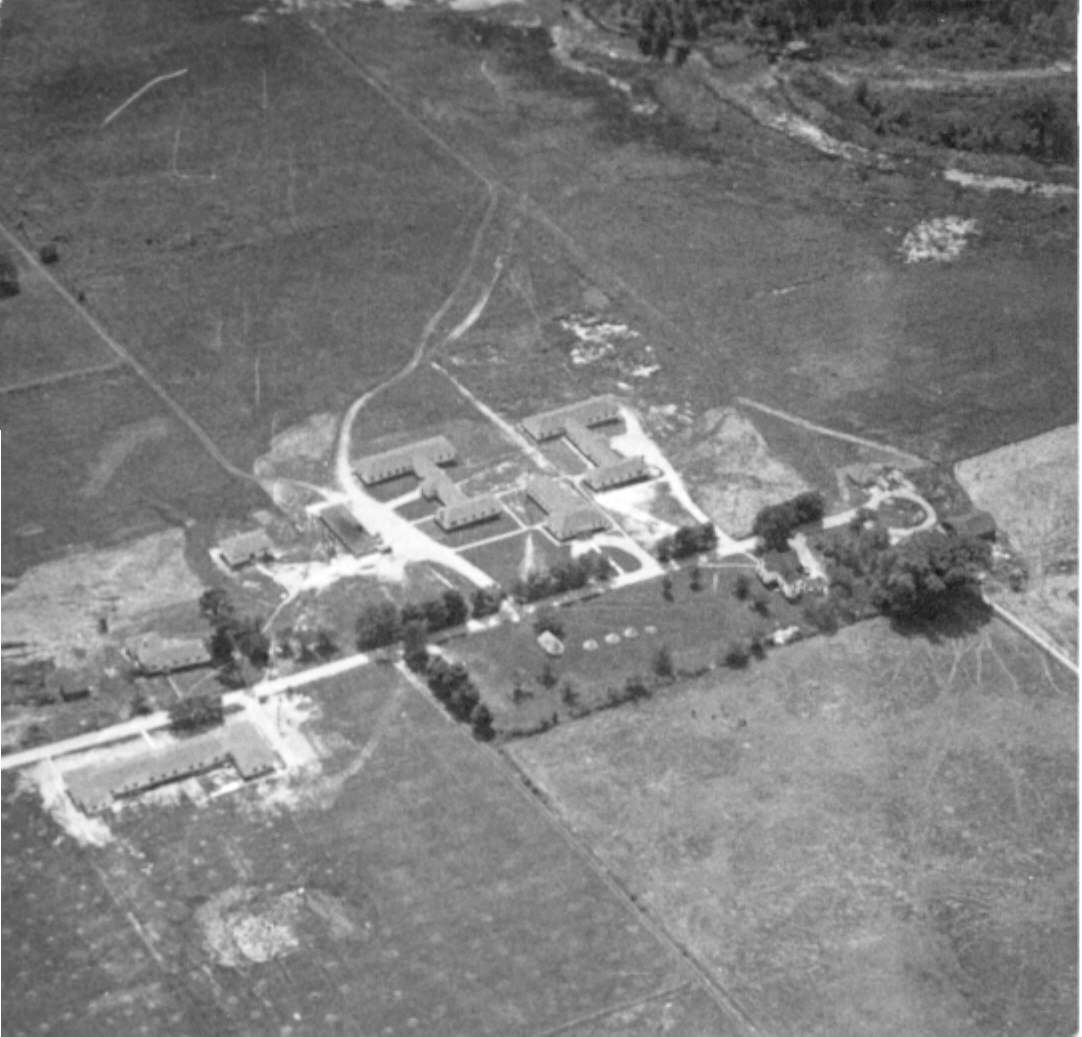
Camp X, a secret allied training camp

The decades following the Rebellions of 1837–1838 marked the start of intelligence services in Canada. Defeat in the failed uprising caused the restoration of colonial regimes and the reform of imperialism. As a result, informal intelligence services were formed to conduct certain activities. 1864 marked the formation of two secret police forces and the formal intelligence service in Canada. Created to protect the Canada–United States border, these organization were under the control of a Montreal police commander and political ally. In response to a number of raid and attacks connected with Irish nationalism, Prime Minister John A. Macdonald merged the two forces to form the Dominion Police (DP). The DP was subsequently merged with the North-West Mounted Police to form the Royal North-West Mounted Police in 1904 and the Royal Canadian Mounted Police (RCMP) in 1920.

During the World War II period, ties with allied intelligence strengthened. Canadian intelligence services, usually following in the way that the British collect information, began to follow the ways of the United States' system; new governmental committees were established and Canadians served in a variety of intelligence capacities, both home and abroad. Camp X, a secret training facility in Ontario, in an example of such joint activities. The camp led to the establishment of the Communications Security Establishment, scientific cooperation in the Manhattan Project and the establishment of the first biological germ warfare station. The 1945 defection of Soviet cipher clerk, Igor Gouzenko served as the catalyst of major structural reform to the security and intelligence system and led to the formation of one of several royal commissions to investigate the activities of foreign intelligence networks in Canada. Recognition came to the RCMP's Intelligence Section when it was elevated to branch status and then re-established as the Directorate of Security and Intelligence or the "I" Directorate. Following a 1969 report, the DSI became the RCMP Security Service and was further elevated from regional-level division to national-level division giving the director even more power.

In 1984, the RCMP Security Service was disbanded to make way for the Canadian Security Intelligence Service. This reform was caused by a report released by the McDonald Commission in 1981. The Department of National Defence and the Canadian Forces have two main agencies responsible for providing intelligence: the Communications Security Establishment, which is responsible for the signals intelligence aspects of military intelligence and the Canadian Forces Intelligence Command which is the main intelligence service of the Canadian Forces. The Int Branch, as it is sometimes referred as, conduct operations both home and abroad to provide correct and up-to-date information to defence operation planners and commanders.

== History ==
=== Early days ===
Canadian intelligence got its start decades after the 19th century rebellions of Upper (now Ontario) and Lower (now Quebec) Canada. With republicanism defeated in the failed uprisings, the colonial regimes in the Canadas were reconstituted and imperial rule was reformed. Stipendiary Magistrates were encouraged to form informal intelligence services to intercept mails, police taverns, and suppress political discussions.

In September 1864, John A. Macdonald, the premier of the United Provinces (and eventually the first prime minister of Canada), formed two secret police forces to guard the Canada–United States border, and to prevent U.S. infringement on Canadian neutrality during the U.S. Civil War. William Ermatinger, a Montreal police administrator with some anti-labor experience, was placed in charge of the secret police service in eastern Canada. In Ontario, Gilbert McMicken, a political ally, was chosen to form an organization which would later become the Western Frontier Constabulary.

The formative period in the institutional development of Canadian intelligence agencies is unique in the sense that the birth of the fledgling services predated confederation in 1867 by several years. The Fenians, an Irish nationalist movement that operated in North America, whose goal was to liberate Ireland from British rule, got these two intelligence services preoccupied. Between the period of 1865 to 1870, Irish nationalists launched a number of raids to strike back at the British Empire. A "lone wolf" believed to be, who was a sympathizer for Irish nationalism, assassinated Canadian politician Thomas D'Arcy McGee. In response to these events, Prime Minister Macdonald, in 1868, merged the two police forces to form the Dominion Police (DP) which was headquartered in Ottawa.

In 1873, the Ottawa-based DP was joined in western Canada by the creation of the North-West Mounted Police (NWMP) which led to the creation of the Royal North-West Mounted Police (RNWMP) in 1904. The RNWMP later became the Royal Canadian Mounted Police in 1920. Early reports of an intelligence nature were provided in addition to the main responsibilities of the force, which were to provide law and order or pacifying the west depending on one's politics.

=== Early 1900s ===
The fledgling intelligence services in Canada grew in the 1900s and its network of officers expanded. W. C. Hopkinson, a representative of the British Home Office, the India Office and the Canadian government between 1909 and 1914 through the Immigration Department and the DP, gave special attention to the Sikh and Hindu nationalists. Paid a substantial monthly stipend by the Indian, British, and Canadian governments, Hopkinson was assassinated in Victoria, British Columbia, in 1914 by a Sikh nationalist named Mewa Singh. The network, which had depended so much upon Hopkinson's mercenary style, fell apart shortly thereafter under his successors Robert Nathan, Malcolm J. Reid, and A. F. Jolliffe.

World War I and the 1917–1920 Labor revolt were the main reasons for the reform of the institutional framework of the Canadian security and intelligence service. Coordination of the decentralized Canadian wartime security effort was the responsibility of the DP. However, Other agencies such as the RNWMP, the Department of Immigration and provincial and municipal authorities also conducted investigations. each of these agencies reported to a different ministers, this caused considerable overlapping in responsibilities and active investigations. Thus, the system proved an unworkable amalgam and it was only a matter of time before a clearer system would be worked out, or it would be scrapped altogether.

With the fear of the consequences of increased labor and industrial unrest in early 1918, the Criminal Investigations Branch (CIB) was formed in the RNWMP in Regina. An overheated and reactionary federal government felt Canada was headed toward a Bolshevik-style revolution after the number of strikes dramatically increased. Prime Minister Robert Borden called a meeting with A. B. Perry, the commissioner of the RNWMP, in August 1919 to discuss the unworkable intelligence system in Canada and find a solution to it. Perry supplied a blueprint with several options days later. A decision was come upon and, in 1920, the RNWMP was dissolved to make way for the Royal Canadian Mounted Police. The RCMP's headquarters was to be set up in Ottawa, in order to make the agency national in scope. The RCMP would become the sole agency for security and intelligence matters in Canada.

At the Ottawa RCMP headquarters, Facilitation of this newly centralized security and intelligence apparatus called for a number of new sections and positions to be established. This task was, for the most part, carried out by the CIB, which was also responsible for more menial tasks such as enforcing federal statutes. The liaison and intelligence officer (LIC) position was one of the positions which were created. This position was first held by Colonel C. F. Hamilton. Hamilton subsequently with various levels in the Canadian government and consulted similar police and intelligence agencies abroad, as well as oversaw the generation of weekly and biweekly intelligence bulletins. A Central Registry (CR) was also established for filing and indexing intelligence materials sent directly to Ottawa from the outlying divisions.

The Canadian left-wing became a major priority for intelligence services in the RCMP during the period between the two world wars, particularity focusing on the Communist Party of Canada (CPC). As the likelihood of a second world war increased in 1938, some attention shifted to fascist movements in Canada. In these years, at divisions and in the field, the number of persons involved in intelligence work varied enormously. This number did not usually exceed 10 to 20 officers in major cities and most work was done on a part-time basis. Likewise, the full-time Ottawa intelligence staff never exceeded more than a handful of personnel in the inter-war period. However, the efforts of Ottawa and out-lying divisions produced hundreds of thousands of pages of material in the period alone.

=== World War II ===
During World War II, while the government cracked down on suspected subversives in Canada, links strengthened with Allied intelligence agencies. The Canadian services, originally much more closely aligned with the British, became increasingly similar with the United States' system; new governmental department committees were created and Canadians served in a variety of intelligence capacities at home and abroad.

One example of joint intelligence activity was establishing Camp X, a secret allied training facility in Ontario involved in the eventual creation of the Communications Security Establishment (CSE), through Bill Stephenson's U.S.-based British Security Coordination (BSC), and through scientific cooperation in the Manhattan Project, and also the creation of the first biological germ warfare stations.

In 1945, Igor Gouzenko, a cipher clerk from the Soviet Union, defected to Ottawa. This event served as the catalyst for major reform to the security and intelligence system in Canada. It also caused the formation of the first of several royal commissions to investigate the activities of foreign intelligence networks operating on Canadian soil, and the failures and illegal activities of the Canadian service since its inception.

A security panel was established in 1946 to supervise and advise on security policy and the RCMP's Intelligence Section, although still within the CIB, was elevated to branch status. Further recognition of the RCMP's intelligence apparatus came in 1950 when the officer in charge of the Intelligence Section became directly responsible to the commissioner, and, in 1956, when the branch was elevated once again and re-established as the Directorate of Security and Intelligence (DSI) or RCMP "I" Directorate. Following the 1969 report of the Mackenzie Commission, the DSI became the RCMP Security Service and the branch was elevated from regional-division level to national-division level giving the Director-General even more responsibility.

=== Modern intelligence ===
Logo of the Canadian Security Intelligence Service.

In 1981, Royal Commission of Inquiry into Certain Activities of the Royal Canadian Mounted Police, commonly referred to as the McDonald Commission released a scathing report. This report included a recommendation that the RCMP's Security Service be completely removed and a new civilian agency be formed. This recommendation came after revelations of the illegal activities that were carried out by the service's officers. A group called the Security Intelligence Transitional Group (SITG) was formed to implement these policy decisions and on 16 July 1984, the Security Service was disbanded in order to make way for the Canadian Security Intelligence Service (CSIS)

Major and minor intelligence organisations have proliferated since World War II. They are spread across different government departments. Major organisations include the Bureau of Intelligence Analysis and Security and Bureau of Economic Intelligence within the Department of Foreign Affairs and International Trade (DFAIT) and the Communications Security Establishment and Intelligence and Security in the Department of National Defence (DND); and a Police and Security Branch was established in the solicitor general's office.

A foreign intelligence service, similar to the Central Intelligence Agency of the United States and MI6 of the United Kingdom, has never been established in Canada. However, through a number of agencies and through its Foreign Affairs postings, it has provided considerable political and economic intelligence to Ottawa decision makers. This has very much blurred the boundaries as to what is required before a foreign intelligence service (FIS) is said to exist. Thinking has been that, due to the lack of clear and present danger to Canada, the high cost and political risk involved, such an agency is not a necessity. However, supporters of a dedicated Canadian agency noted that Canada could not rely on its interests coinciding with those of the UK and USA which supplied its intelligence, in contrast to the Cold War period when they shared a common enemy. A dedicated agency might also boost Canada's international standing and increase its global influence.

The Conservative government of Stephen Harper raised the issue again in 2006, and stated that it would "expand the Canadian Foreign Intelligence Agency to effectively gather intelligence overseas, independently counter threats before they reach Canada, and increase allied intelligence operations." However it later changed its mind and decided to give further powers to CSIS instead.

=== Intelligence networks ===
The attention that fledgling intelligence services paid over time evolved. However, immigrants, labor, and political organizations earned more coverage than most other groups. The preoccupation with Irish nationalists in the 1860s and 1870s saw expanded networks which peaked with a combined total of approximately 60 agents and operatives, and on more than one occasion these agents slipped south of the Canada–US border to infiltrate US branches of the Fenian movement in cities such as New York, Buffalo, Chicago, and Kansas City.

A notable British/American operative was Thomas Beach (aka Henri Le Caron) an Englishman first recruited in 1867 to work for British intelligence services, but who eventually negotiated a healthy monthly stipend to provide the DP with regular intelligence, and who published his own memoir in 1893.

When the perceived threat of Irish nationalist receded, focus of the Canadian intelligence system shifted. Limited intelligence was collected between the 1884-85 Red River Rebellion, and anarchists also caught the attention of the Canadian service a decade later. Then, after a lock at the Welland Canal was dynamited in 1900 by Irish nationalists prompting renewed state interest in the organization, and between 1901 and 1903 another group, the Order of the Midnight Sun, a U.S. annexation movement, was the target of Canadian intelligence. During the Yukon Gold Rush, the NWMP provided the federal government with considerable intelligence, and for the next two decades RNWMP and DP attention turned to other immigrants, political organizations, and unions, such as the Socialist Party of Canada (SPC), the Industrial Workers of the World (IWW), and the One Big Union (OBU).

== Military intelligence ==
The main intelligence service of the Department of National Defence and the Canadian Forces is the Canadian Forces Intelligence Command, which is the centre of the activity of Intelligence Branch. The Intelligence Branch is a Personnel branch with the mandate to provide correct and up-to-date information to Defence policymakers and commanders. In order for them to comply with this mandate, they conduct operations, covert or overt, at home or abroad. In such conditions and environments abroad such as Haiti, Bosnia and Herzegovina and Afghanistan or environments in Canada such as the Quebec ice storms or the British Columbian wildfires.

The interception of foreign radio and communications, commonly referred to as signals intelligence or SIGINT, is in the mandate of the Communications Security Establishment (CSE), an agency that is located within the portfolio of the Department of National Defence. The agency is also responsible for providing technical advice and guidance to the federal government and to ensure the security of Canadian government communications. The CSE was established as the Examinations Unit of the National Research Council in June 1941 and was headquartered at the Laurier Avenue residence of the prime minister. The government had chosen this headquarters because they felt it wouldn't draw undue public attention. At its establishment, the Examinations Unit had been mandated to intercept communications of Vichy France and Germany. When Japan entered the Second World War, the unit's mandate expanded to include the interception of Japanese communications. In a 1944 estimation, the unit had 45 staff members. It was later renamed the Communications Branch.

The Military of Canada had intelligence operatives on the ground in Afghanistan from the time Canada started contributing to Operation Enduring Freedom. This was confirmed by Brigadier General Denis Thompson, on the same day that it was revealed that the Canadian Forces had established a new, specialized unit, called the Human Intelligence Company, to conduct intelligence operations in Afghanistan. The Canadian Broadcasting Corporation obtained documents saying that the Canadian Forces spent over $20 million on the new unit, which was reported in 2008 to be actively recruiting new soldiers.

== See also ==
- Five Eyes
