= David Dyson =

David Dyson may refer to:

- David Dyson (musician) (born 1965), American bassist, songwriter, arranger, and producer
- David Dyson (businessman) (born 1970), chief executive of Three UK
- David Dyson (naturalist), (1823–1856) British naturalist, scientific collector, curator and weaver
- David J. Dyson (1863–1949), mayor of Winnipeg, Manitoba
