= Lyman Melvin Jones =

Canadian politician

The Honourable Sir Lyman Melvin Jones
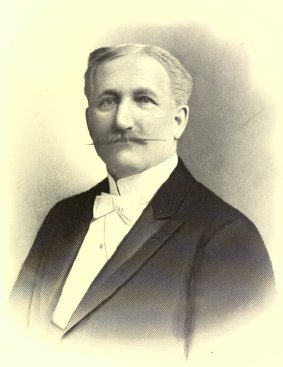

Canadian Senator from Ontario
- In office 21 January 1901 – 15 April 1917
- Appointed by: Wilfrid Laurier

Member of the Legislative Assembly of Manitoba for Winnipeg North
- In office 1888–1892

9th Mayor of Winnipeg
- In office 1887–1888
- Preceded by: Henry Shaver Westbrook
- Succeeded by: Thomas Ryan

Personal details
- Born: 21 September 1843 Whitchurch Township, Upper Canada
- Died: 15 April 1917 (aged 73) Toronto, Ontario, Canada
- Party: Liberal

Sir Lyman Melvin Jones (21 September 1843 – 15 April 1917) was a Canadian businessman and politician.

== Background ==
Born into a farming family near Whitchurch, Upper Canada, Jones settled as a young man in Winnipeg, Manitoba, where he was the representative of A. Harris, Son and Company of Brantford. Following the merger of the Massey Manufacturing Co. and Harris's company, Jones became, in 1891, the general manager of the newly formed Massey-Harris Company based in Toronto, Ontario. On 21 January 1901, he was appointed to the Senate of Canada on the recommendation of Sir Wilfrid Laurier, and represented the senatorial division of Toronto, Ontario, as a Liberal until his death.

In 1887 and 1888, he served as Mayor of Winnipeg.
