= Frederick Davison =

Frederick Davison may refer to:

- Frederick Davison (organ builder) (1815–1889), British pipe organ builder
- Frederick Corbet Davison (1929–2004), president of the University of Georgia
- F. Trubee Davison (1896–1974), New York State Representative, Assistant US Secretary of War

== See also ==
- Frederic E. Davison (1917–1999), United States Army general
- Frederick Davidson (1865–1935), mayor of Winnipeg
- David Frederick Case (1932–2005), audiobook narrator who used the alias Frederick Davidson
