= Edward Parnell =

Edward Parnell may refer to:

- Edward Parnell (politician) (1859–1922), mayor of Winnipeg, Canada
- Edward Parnell (sport shooter) (1875–1941), British Olympic sport shooter
