= Stephen Juba =

Canadian politician (1914–1993)

- Juba in 1978

37th Mayor of Winnipeg
- In office 1957–1977
- Preceded by: George Sharpe
- Succeeded by: Robert Steen

Member of the Legislative Assembly of Manitoba
- In office 1953–1959

Personal details
- Born: July 1, 1914 Winnipeg, Manitoba
- Died: May 2, 1993 (aged 78) Petersfield, Manitoba
- Party: Independent
- Spouse: Elva Juba
- Children: None
- Occupation: Entrepreneur

Stephen Juba OC (July 1, 1914 – May 2, 1993) was a Canadian politician. He was a member of the Legislative Assembly of Manitoba from 1953 to 1959, and served as the 37th Mayor of Winnipeg from 1957 to 1977. He was the first Ukrainian Canadian to hold high political office in the city.

== Early life ==
He was born in Winnipeg to Gregory Juba (1885–1958, originally Dziuba) and Sophia Mosata (1888–1970) who both came from Horodok, Ukraine. He married Jennie Brow on April 14, 1946 at Holy Ghost Ukrainian Catholic Church in Brooklands, Manitoba. They divorced in 1948. He would then marry Elva. There were no children by either marriage. His brother, Daniel Harry Juba (1909–1986), was mayor of Brooklands, Manitoba. Juba Street in Brooklands was named after his brother.

Juba left school at age fifteen, when his family could no longer pay for his education. His father, a building contractor, saw his practice decline after the stock market crash of 1929. Juba worked in odd jobs for several years and started two small businesses before he was twenty-one: Weston Builders Ltd. and S.N. Juba & Co. These names reflected Juba's gift for self-promotion. Weston Builders Ltd. was not actually an incorporated company; Juba had simply added "Ltd." to its name to make it "look official". In the case of S.N. Juba & Co., he added a fictitious middle initial because he thought it "sounded good". He was largely unsuccessful as a businessman until 1945, when he started a wholesale distributing firm called Keystone Supply Ltd, which would make him wealthy.

== Political career ==
Juba's first forays into electoral politics were unsuccessful. He ran as an independent candidate in Winnipeg North Centre in the June 1949 Canadian federal election, against rising CCF star Stanley Knowles. He later acknowledged that he did not expect to win, but entered the race "to gain experience" and "to be educated by an expert". He received only 694 votes, finishing a very distant fourth.

In the 1949 Manitoba general election in November, Juba ran in the riding of Winnipeg Centre as an Independent Liberal, supporting the coalition government of Douglas Lloyd Campbell. The City of Winnipeg was divided into three provincial constituencies at the time, each of which elected four members by preferential balloting. Juba finished eighth with 1015 votes on the first ballot, and was eliminated on the fourth count.

He ran for the Winnipeg City Council in 1950 and 1952, and came surprisingly close to winning on the second occasion.

He challenged Winnipeg mayor Garnet Coulter later in 1952, and received 28,000 votes to Coulter's 38,000; CCF candidate Donovan Swailes finished third with 22,000. Under the Alternative Voting system in use, Swailes' votes were transferred, mostly to Coulter who won the seat. Juba called for reform of the province's liquor laws during this campaign.

In 1954 he ran for mayor again, this time placing second to alderman George Sharpe. Juba would be more successful in the next election.

== MLA ==
With an increased civic profile, Juba ran again as an independent in the 1953 provincial election. He finished second in Winnipeg Centre, and secured election on the eighth count. During this election, Juba supported racetrack gambling to fund the provincial hospital system.

During his time as an MLA, Juba remained independent of party politics and was not committed to any particular ideology. His primary accomplishment was securing reform for the province's outdated liquor laws.

Juba was also re-elected as an MLA in the provincial election of 1958, this time defeating CCF candidate Art Coulter in the redistributed, single-member riding of Logan. Dufferin Roblin led the Progressive Conservatives to a minority government that proved to be short-lived. He did not seek re-election again when it fell in 1959. He chose instead to concentrate on his responsibilities at city hall. He had been elected mayor of Winnipeg in 1956.

== Mayor of Winnipeg ==
Juba ran for the mayor's office again in 1956, and was successful. He would serve as mayor from then until 1977.

His 1956 win came, after a campaign in which he referred to Sharpe as Premier Campbell's "trained seal", and promised to fight harder for the city's fair share of provincial revenues. On election day, Juba received 46,197 votes to Sharpe's 44,266. Most of his support came from the city's ethnically diverse north-end, and his election was seen as a major victory for the city's non-British communities. One local newspaper described the result as a "big upset", and provincial CCF leader Lloyd Stinson later called it "a pretty shocking experience for South Winnipeg".

Winnipeg was the first city in North America to use a central emergency number (in 1959). It instituted the change at the urging of Mayor Juba.

Juba's tenure as mayor saw the eviction and demolition of the Rooster Town Métis community south of the city in 1959, which made way for the development of the Grant Park Shopping Centre and Grant Park High School.

Juba was a flamboyant mayor. He was skilled at using the media to win support for his causes. He was a strong promoter of Winnipeg on the world stage: in 1967, he oversaw the Pan-American Games in the city. Though he presented himself as a spokesman for marginalized groups in the city's north end, he did not adhere to social democracy and often had a difficult relationship with the CCF and its successor, the NDP. Some have referred to him as a "pro-business populist".

Juba supported the amalgamation of Winnipeg during the late 1960s. He convinced the NDP government led by Edward Schreyer to grant direct mayoral elections in the unified city. Schreyer had favoured a parliamentary model of government, in which the elected councillors would choose a mayor from among themselves.

Not surprisingly, Juba himself was elected the first mayor of the unified city in 1971. He was opposed by the city's right-wing Independent Citizens' Election Committee during the 1970s, and frequently clashed with ICEC leader and Deputy Mayor Bernie Wolfe. Notwithstanding this, he also endorsed a variety of urban development projects that were promoted by ICEC leaders.

== Relationship with the NDP ==
In 1966, Juba considered running in the provincial riding of Inkster against New Democrat Len Stevens, but withdrew after Sidney Green replaced Stevens as the NDP candidate.

While Juba was usually an ally of NDP Premier Edward Schreyer in the 1970s, he also frequently clashed with ministers such as Russell Doern over the allocation of provincial resources. During the 1977 provincial election, he campaigned against NDP candidates in several Winnipeg ridings.

== Ended his mayoralty 1977 ==
He was initially a candidate for re-election in the mayoral election of 1977, but unexpectedly withdrew at the last moment. Most suspect that he timed his departure to prevent Wolfe from succeeding him in 1980. ICEC opponent Robert Steen was able to win a narrow victory in the election which followed, primarily with support from Juba's north-end base.

Juba made another foray into electoral politics in the provincial election of 1981, running as an independent candidate in his old riding of Logan. He garnered only 676 votes and was defeated by NDP candidate Maureen Hemphill with 3,744 votes. He did not attempt any further comebacks after this.

== Legacy ==
The Stephen Juba Park was opened in Winnipeg in 1984. In 1986, Michael Czuboka published Juba, a biography of the former mayor.

In 1970, he was made an Officer of the Order of Canada.

== Later life ==
Juba died at home in Petersfield in 1993 at the age of 78.

Elva Juba died in 1996.
