= Alfred Pearson =

Alfred Pearson may refer to:

- Alfred Pearson (bishop) (1848–1909), Bishop of Burnley, 1905–1909
- Alfred Pearson (politician) (1850–1921), entrepreneur and politician, mayor of Winnipeg
- Alfred Astley Pearson (1850–1937), British Indian Army officer
- Alfred Chilton Pearson (1861–1935), English classical scholar
- Alfred J. Pearson (1869–1939), American diplomat
- Alfred L. Pearson (1838–1903), lawyer and Union Army general in the American Civil War
