= Alfred Pearson (politician) =

Canadian politician

Alfred Pearson (c. 1850 - April 19, 1921) was an entrepreneur and politician who served as the 11th Mayor of Winnipeg.

Pearson was born in Bannington, Warwickshire, England and emigrated to Canada as a young adult. He settled in Winnipeg and started a general store with a business partner. In 1890, he was elected to mayor and served until 1891.

In 1892, he moved to Chicago and became a stockbroker.

He died in Los Angeles, where he had moved as a result of a bout of pneumonia.

Preceded by Thomas Ryan	Mayor of Winnipeg, MB; 1890-1891	Succeeded by Alexander Macdonald
