= Alexander Logan =

Mayor Alexander Logan

4th Mayor of Winnipeg
- In office 1879–1880
- In office 1882–1882
- In office 1884–1884

Personal details
- Born: 5 November 1841 Fort Douglas
- Died: 23 June 1894 (aged 52) Winnipeg, Manitoba
- Spouse: Maria Lane (m. 1864)

Alexander Logan (5 November 1841 – 23 June 1894) was a Canadian politician, serving as the fourth Mayor of Winnipeg on three occasions, first from 1879 to 1882 then in 1882 and finally in 1884. Prior to this, he served as a city alderman between 1874 and 1878.

Logan's major work as mayor was to create incentives for the federal government to build the Canadian Pacific Railway route through Winnipeg. Charles Tupper, then the Canadian minister of public works, originally intended to locate the railway away from the city, but relented when Logan led a series of city measures to provide the railway with exemption from taxation, land donation for the passenger terminal. Logan also presided over a council decision to offer funding for a bridge across the Red River which resulted in the construction of the Louise Bridge.
