= Frank Oliver Fowler =

Canadian politician

Mayor Frank Oliver Fowler

29th Mayor of Winnipeg
- In office 20 June 1922 – 1922
- Preceded by: Edward Parnell
- Succeeded by: Seymour Farmer

Member of the Legislative Assembly of Manitoba for Brandon South
- In office 1897–1903
- Preceded by: Herbert Graham
- Succeeded by: Alfred Carroll

Personal details
- Born: 14 December 1861 Wingham, Canada West
- Died: 18 February 1945 (aged 83) unknown
- Spouse: Elizabeth Nichol
- Profession: farmer

Frank Oliver Fowler (14 December 1861 – 18 February 1945) was a Canadian politician serving as a member of the Legislative Assembly of Manitoba, then in Winnipeg city politics as an alderman and subsequently as the 29th Mayor.

He moved from Ontario to the Brandon, Manitoba region in the early 1880s where he was a farmer. He established a grain company in Wawanesa in 1891 and became a leader in regional grain industry associations after Fowler and his family moved to Winnipeg in 1902.

Fowler was acclaimed to the Manitoba legislature for the South Brandon riding following a by-election on 20 November 1897. He was re-elected in the 1899 general provincial election and remained in provincial office until 1903. After leaving provincial office, he became a city alderman in 1908 where he supported restrictions on trade unions. He was acclaimed Mayor on 20 June 1922, 11 days after Edward Parnell died in office. Fowler served as Mayor for the remainder of that year.

His name is commemorated by Fowler Street in Winnipeg.
