= Charles Gray (Canadian politician) =

Canadian politician

Mayor Charles Frederick Gray
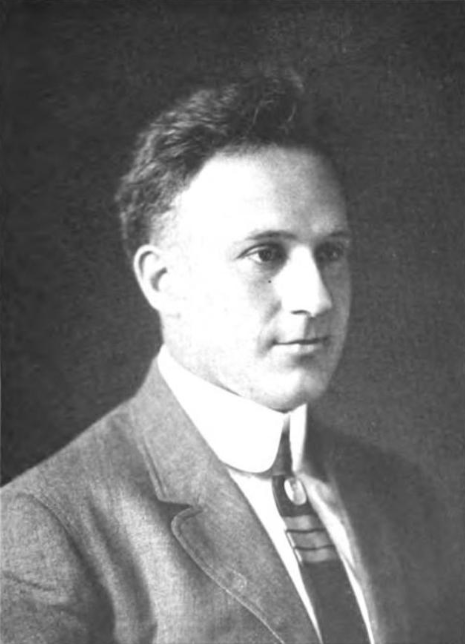

27th Mayor of Winnipeg
- In office 1919–1920
- Preceded by: Frederick Harvey Davidson
- Succeeded by: Edward Parnell

Personal details
- Born: 17 December 1879 London, England
- Died: 27 June 1954 (aged 74) Victoria, British Columbia, Canada

Charles Frederick Gray (17 December 1879 – 27 June 1954) was a Canadian politician, the 27th Mayor of Winnipeg in 1919 and 1920.

Gray was born in London, England and moved to Canada, eventually settling in Winnipeg. In 1917, he joined the city's Board of Control,

He successfully sought election as mayor the next year. His first year as mayor was marked by the Winnipeg General Strike in which he replaced much of the police force with special constables in an effort to control the protests, ending with a violent confrontation with striking workers on 21 June 1919, known as "Bloody Saturday".

He was re-elected mayor in November 1919, getting more votes than his Labour opponent Seymour Farmer. presiding over a Citizen's Committee-dominated (anti-labour) city government. He did not run for re-election in 1920, the first city election held using Single Transferable Voting.

He moved to Ashland, British Columbia in 1941 and managed a salt mining operation there.
