= Cartier (Manitoba provincial electoral district) =

Defunct provincial electoral district in Manitoba, Canada

Cartier is a former provincial electoral district in Manitoba, Canada. It was located in Cartier. The district was first appeared in the 1879 election and lasted until 1892 when the riding was re-distributed into Morris.

== Members of the Legislative Assembly ==
Name	Party	Took office	Left office
Gilbert McMicken	Liberal-Conservative	1879	1883
Joseph Lecomte	Conservative	1883	1886
Thomas Gelley	Conservative	1886	1888
Thomas Gelley	Independent-Liberal	1888	1892

== See also ==
- List of Manitoba provincial electoral districts
- Canadian provincial electoral districts
