= Frederick Warriner =

Frederick Edgar Warriner (April 3, 1884 – December 26, 1966) was the 34th Mayor of Winnipeg in 1937.

He was born in Stouffville, Ontario and received his degree in dentistry from the University of Toronto in 1907. He moved to Winnipeg in 1917 and set up practice.

Warriner was elected to the Winnipeg School Board in 1928 and served on it until 1937 when he was elected mayor replacing John Queen who, in turn, succeeded Warriner one year later.

He also served as mayor of Winnipeg Beach from 1931 to 1936.

== Sources ==
- Biography

Preceded by John Queen	Mayor of Winnipeg, MB; 1937	Succeeded by John Queen
