= John Arbuthnot (Canadian politician) =

Canadian politician

Mayor John Arbuthnot
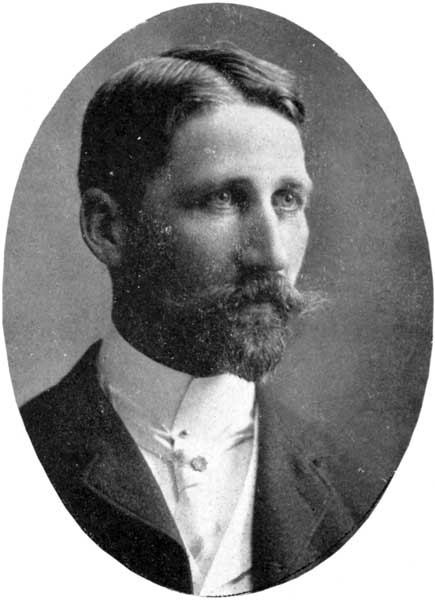

19th Mayor of Winnipeg
- In office 1901–1903
- Preceded by: Horace Wilson
- Succeeded by: Thomas Sharpe

Personal details
- Born: 7 January 1861 St. Catharines, Canada West
- Died: 18 September 1931 (aged 70) New Westminster, British Columbia
- Spouse: Agnes Barbara Savage (m. 1886)

John Arbuthnot (7 January 1861 – 18 September 1931) was a Canadian businessman and politician who served as an alderman and the 19th Mayor of Winnipeg. He was born in Grantham township, Lincoln County, Ontario.

Arbuthnot worked as a clerk at Port Arthur, Ontario for John Ross, manager of construction 1882-85 for the Canadian Pacific Railway along the north shore of Lake Superior from Port Arthur to Missanabie. After railway construction ended, he moved back to St Catharines, Ontario where he married Agnes Barbara Savage 17 February 1886, a niece of John Ross. The 1891 Canada census at St Catharines records John as a lumber salesman, living there with his wife, two children, Ross and William, and in-laws, William and Christina Ross Savage. About 1891-92 John then moved to Rat Portage, Ontario to work at the Western Lumber Company where his brother-in-law James Malcolm Savage was company secretary. He established his own lumber business after moving to Winnipeg.

He was elected as a Winnipeg alderman for the years 1896 and 1897 before serving as City Parks Board chair the following two years. He was elected as Mayor to serve terms from 1901 to 1903. In 1907 he left Winnipeg for British Columbia and remained in that province until his death in 1931. He initially worked in partnership with his brother-in-law James Malcolm Savage managing a coal mining company.

The City of Winnipeg named Arbuthnot Street in his honour.
