= William McCreary =

Canadian politician

16th Mayor of Winnipeg
- In office 1897–1897
- Succeeded by: A.J. Andrews

Member of Parliament for Selkirk
- Preceded by: John Alexander MacDonell
- Succeeded by: Samuel Jacob Jackson

Personal details
- Born: 5 May 1855 Pakenham, Canada West
- Died: 4 May 1904 (aged 48) Ottawa, Ontario, Canada
- Spouse: Annie Ellis Greene (m. 1882)

William Forsythe McCreary (5 May 1855 – 4 May 1904) was a Canadian politician and lawyer. McCreary served as an alderman and the 16th Mayor of Winnipeg and as a Member of the House of Commons of Canada.

McCreary was a lawyer who moved to Manitoba in 1881 where he became a Winnipeg alderman in 1883. He held that city post again in 1884 and 1886 and after a nine-year gap became the city's Mayor for 1897. He also became Commissioner of Immigration that year, noted for his assistance with providing Doukhobors with food supplies in 1898 as they settled in Western Canada.

McCreary was elected to the House of Commons of Canada under the Liberal party in the 1900 federal election at Selkirk electoral district. He served most of his term in the 9th Canadian Parliament until his sudden death at Ottawa's Russell House Hotel on 4 May 1904. A doctor and coroner examining his body concluded that McCreary died of heart disease early that morning. He indicated to some colleagues the previous evening that he was experiencing chest pains, following his attendance in Parliament.

The City of Winnipeg named McCreary Road in his honour. The Rural Municipality of McCreary is also named after him.
