= Percy Sherwood (police officer) =

Colonel Sir Percy Sherwood KCMG MVO
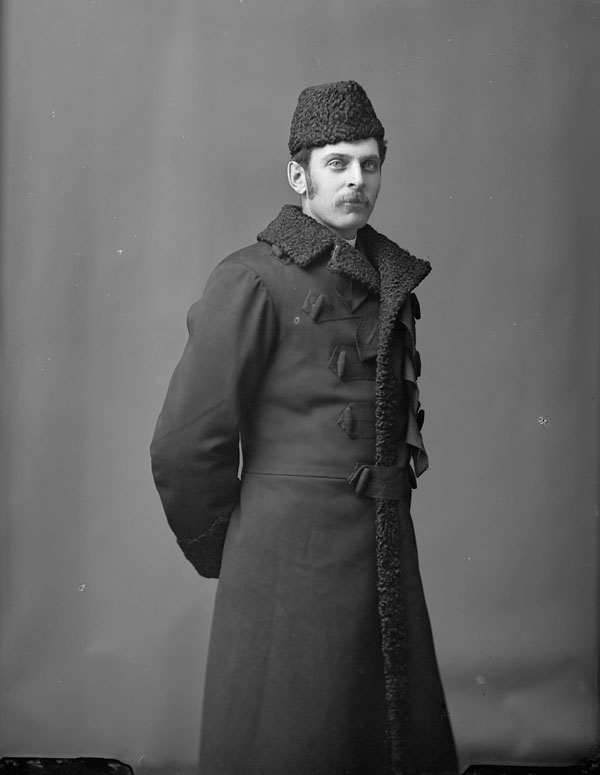
- Sherwood in c. 1889

Chief Commissioner of the Dominion Police Force
- In office 1885–1919

Personal details
- Born: March 18, 1854 Ottawa, Canada West
- Died: October 15, 1940 (aged 86) Ottawa, Ontario

Colonel Sir Arthur Percy Sherwood KCMG MVO (March 18, 1854 – October 15, 1940) was the Commissioner of Police of the Dominion Police in Canada.

Percy Sherwood was born in Ottawa and educated at the Ottawa Grammar School.

Sherwood was instrumental in the development of intelligence and security in Canada in the late 19th century through the early 20th century. He was appointed Deputy Sheriff of Carleton County, June, 1877; Chief of Police of the City of Ottawa, April 5, 1879: Superintendent of Dominion Police, October, 1882; and Commissioner of same, November, 1885. Chief Commissioner of Dominion Police (1885-1919).

Sherwood served in the militia of Canada with the Governor General's Foot Guards and eventually commanding the 43rd Duke of Cornwall's Own Rifles.
