= James Henry Ashdown =

Canadian businessman

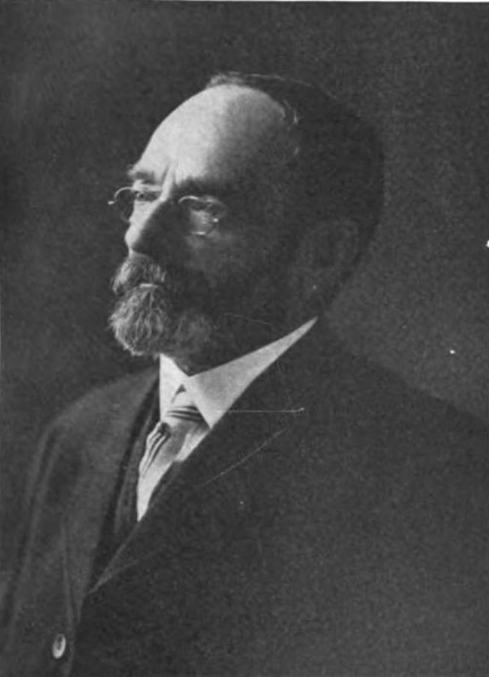

21st Mayor of Winnipeg
- In office 1907–1908
- Preceded by: Thomas Sharpe
- Succeeded by: William Sanford Evans

Personal details
- Born: 31 March 1844 London, England
- Died: 5 April 1924 (aged 80) Winnipeg, Manitoba
- Occupation: Merchant, politician

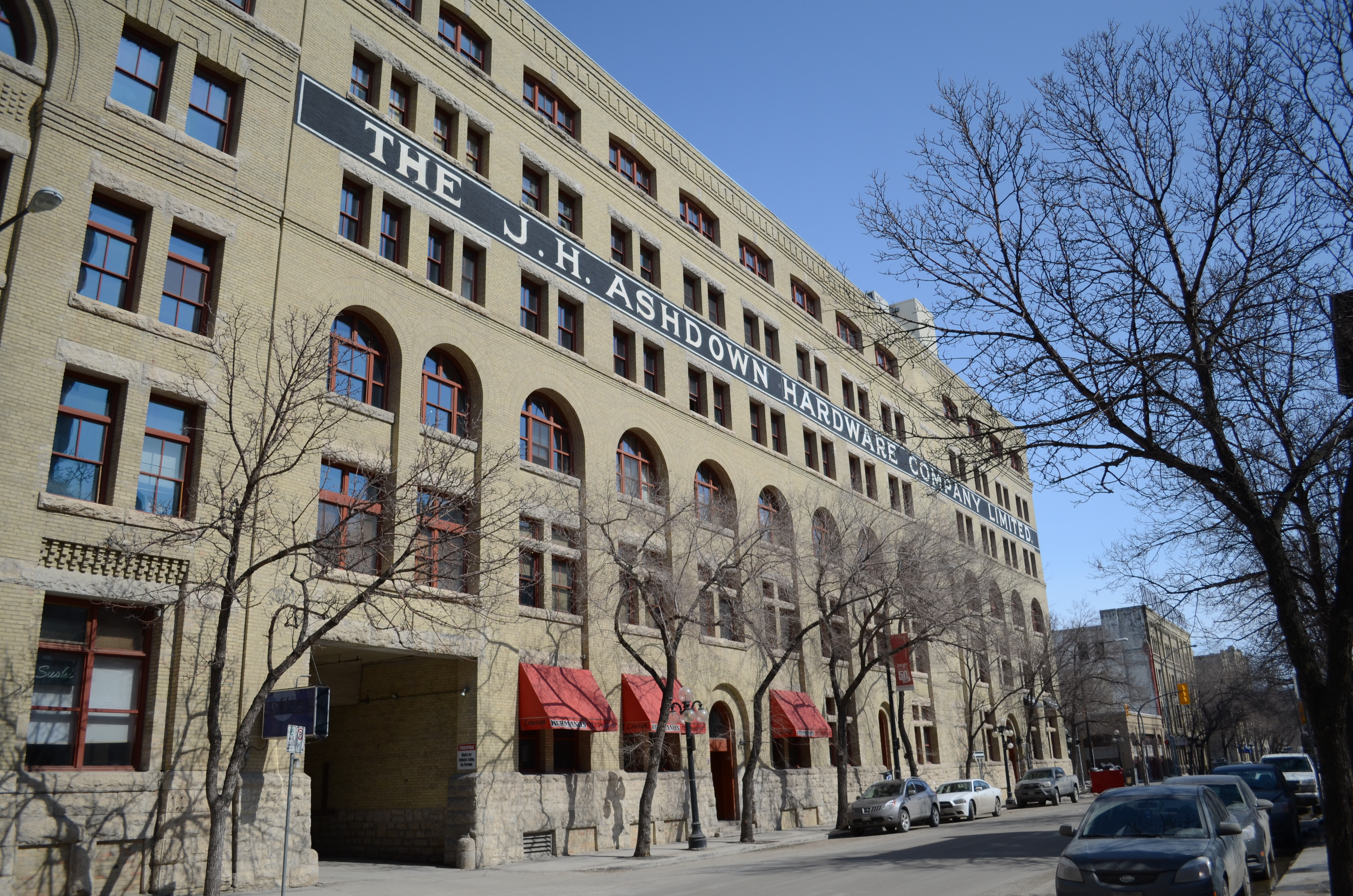
JH Ashdown Hardware Company Ltd Building (167 Bannatyne)

James Henry Ashdown (31 March 1844 – 5 April 1924), the "Merchant Prince of Winnipeg", arrived in Winnipeg in 1868 and began his business as a tinsmith. In 1870, he purchased two lots on the corner of Main Street and Bannatyne Avenue, the location of the Ashdown retail store for over one hundred years. Ashdown's successful real estate speculation, combined with his business acumen, made him a millionaire by 1910.

By 1875, his business had expanded into both retail and wholesale operations and by 1881, his worth was over $150,000. He established branch stores in Portage la Prairie and Emerson, employing over seventy-five people. In 1889, he opened a store in Calgary. He settled in the then affluent part of Winnipeg known as Point Douglas, along with W. G. Fonseca, Robert & Stewart Mulvey and Dr. Schultz.

He was elected to the Winnipeg Board of Trade in 1879 along with president A. G. B. Bannatyne, W. H. Lyon, vice-pres., and D. H. McMillan.

He was active in a number of projects to expand the city. The construction of the Canadian Pacific Railway as the main mode of cross-country shipment prompted Ashdown in 1878 to propose that the city offer a bonus of $300,000 toward the construction of a bridge across the Red River from Saint Boniface and to build the desired railway to the western boundary of the province. The Manitoba and South Western Railway co. was created to carry out this proposal and to guarantee that the Dominion Government change the route of the Pacific Railway from Winnipeg westward.

In 1897, Winnipeg wholesalers won a major concession, thanks in part to Ashdown's efforts as chairman of the Freight Rates Committee, to introduce a "Traders Tariff" that ensured that they paid freight charges no greater than those paid by eastern companies.

In 1900, Ashdown sent a whole train through the west loaded with 800 tons of building material and general hardware, with each car labelled, "Hardware from J.H. Ashdown". This spectacular stunt raised the interest of eastern Canadian and American companies to the commercial opportunities in western Canada.

In 1904, the J.H. Ashdown store in Winnipeg burned down and was immediately replaced with a new one that was considered to be the finest hardware store in Canada. Not to be outdone, the T. Eaton Co. of Toronto opened its first store in Winnipeg, in July 1905, comprising 5.5 acres (22,000 m^{2}) of floor space and employing 800 people.

In 1907, Ashdown was elected mayor of Winnipeg and served for two years before being defeated by William Sanford Evans. Winnipeg was hit by a recession in 1907 as an indirect consequence of the Wall Street panic of the same year, with construction hardest hit at the time. Ashdown travelled to Montreal, New York and London in an unsuccessful attempt to sell bonds in order to pay off large loans from the banks. Various developments within the city such as the Louise Bridge construction, a gas plant and a hydro-electric plant at Pointe de Bois were postponed.

Throughout the years, Ashdown's Warehouse supplied every conceivable kind of merchandise, including its own "Diamond A Brand" goods. In the 1990s, the warehouse was one of the first structures in the Exchange District to be converted for residential use.

James H. Ashdown died at his home in Winnipeg on 5 April 1924, but the firm remained a family business until it was sold in 1971. His brother George Ashdown was also a politician, who served as mayor of Morden and in the Legislative Assembly of Manitoba.
