= Thomas Sharpe (politician) =

Canadian politician (1866–1929)

Mayor Thomas Sharpe

20th Mayor of Winnipeg
- In office 1904–1906
- Preceded by: John Arbuthnot
- Succeeded by: James Henry Ashdown

Personal details
- Born: 14 March 1866 County Sligo, Ireland
- Died: 10 May 1929 (aged 63) St. Clements, Manitoba, Canada
- Spouse: Mary Jane Cathcart (m. 1887, d. 1922)
- Profession: contractor, mason

Thomas Sharpe (14 March 1866 – 10 May 1929) was a Canadian politician, the 20th Mayor of Winnipeg from 1904 to 1906.

Sharpe was born in County Sligo, Ireland and worked as a bank clerk in his teens. He moved to Canada in 1885 initially working in Toronto as a pavement contractor, then in 1892 moved to Winnipeg. He was a Winnipeg city alderman since 1899 before becoming mayor.

When a rise in cases of typhoid fever in Winnipeg was discovered in 1904 by the municipal Department of Health, mayor Sharpe responded with an aggressive program to develop and enforce sewage and water services. His work as mayor also led to the establishment of Winnipeg's first Board of Control in 1906.

In March 1906, he responded to a strike by employees of the Winnipeg Electric Railway Company with strikebreakers and then with armed militia, earning the mayor the nickname "Gatling Gun Sharpe". This incident was considered a precursor to the 1919 Winnipeg General Strike.

After 1906, Sharpe did not seek another term as mayor and returned to business interests.
