= John Tully Speirs =

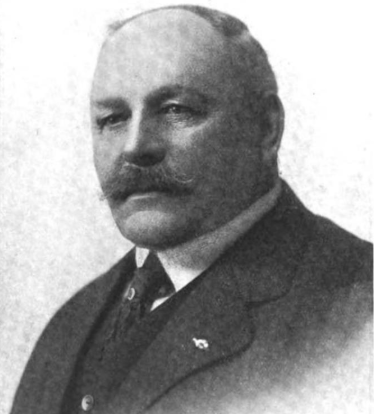
- Born: March 10, 1860; Glasgow, Scotland
- Died: March 13, 1925 (aged 65); Winnipeg, Manitoba
- Occupation: Businessman
- Spouse: Susan Manie (m. 1883)

John Tully Speirs (March 10, 1860 – March 13, 1925) was a Scottish-born businessman and politician in Winnipeg, Manitoba.

== Biography ==
The son of John Speirs and Elisabeth Tully, he was born in Glasgow, was educated in Argyleshire and moved to Winnipeg in 1882. He operated a large bakery in partnership with Edward Parnell. One of the largest in western Canada, the bakery's daily output was 100,000 loaves.

In 1883, Speirs married Susan Manie. He served on Winnipeg City Council.

Speirs died at home in Winnipeg at the age of 63.
