= David J. Dyson =

David J. Dyson (September 12, 1863 – March 12, 1949) was the 25th Mayor of Winnipeg, Manitoba for several days in 1917. His family owned Dyson and Gibson Spice Mills, the makers of Seven Day Pickles.

Dyson was originally declared mayor as a result of the January 1917 municipal election but was unseated on January 5, 1917, due to a recount and Frederick Harvey Davidson was sworn in as Mayor on January 8, 1917. Dyson is accordingly the shortest serving mayor in Winnipeg's history.

Dyson is the great-great-grandfather of CNN journalist Jake Tapper.

Preceded by Richard Deans Waugh	Mayor of Winnipeg, MB; 1917	Succeeded by Frederick Harvey Davidson
