= Thomas Gelley =

Canadian politician

Member of the Legislative Assembly of Manitoba for Cartier
- In office 1886–1892
- Preceded by: Joseph Lecomte
- Succeeded by: None

Personal details
- Born: December 27, 1860 Lévis, Canada East
- Died: March 11, 1939 (aged 78) Ste. Anne des Chenes, Manitoba
- Party: Conservative 1886-1888; Liberal 1888-1892
- Education: Levis Commercial College

Thomas Fraser Gelley (December 27, 1860 – March 11, 1939) was an accountant, farmer and political figure in Manitoba. He represented Cartier from 1886 to 1892 in the Legislative Assembly of Manitoba as a Conservative and then Liberal.

He was born in Lévis, Quebec, the son of Joseph Edmond Gelley, and was educated at Levis Commercial College. Gelley came to Manitoba in 1882, settling on a farm in St. Norbert. He served as a justice of the peace there. Gelley later worked in Winnipeg as an accountant. He was married twice: first to Elizabeth Ann Gallie in 1883 and then to Frances Patricia Dowling in 1925.

When Premier Thomas Greenway named francophone James Prendergast to his cabinet in 1888, Gelley threw his support behind the Liberals.

After leaving politics, Gelley worked as a clerk for the Department of Immigration and Colonization in Winnipeg from 1899 until his retirement in 1931. He died at home in Ste. Anne des Chenes at the age of 78.
