= A. J. Andrews =

Canadian politician (1865–1950)

17th Mayor of Winnipeg
- In office 1898–1899
- Preceded by: William McCreary
- Succeeded by: Horace Wilson

Personal details
- Born: Alfred Joseph Andrews; 24 April 1865 Franklin Centre, Canada East
- Died: 31 January 1950 (aged 84) Winnipeg, Manitoba, Canada
- Spouse: Maude Watson

Alfred Joseph Andrews (24 April 1865 – 31 January 1950) was a Canadian politician serving as an alderman and the 17th Mayor of Winnipeg.

Andrews was a lawyer who moved to Winnipeg in 1880. He became a Winnipeg alderman in 1884 and served in that role until his election as Mayor for 1898 and 1899. He was the founding member of the Citizens' Committee of 1000.

The City of Winnipeg named Andrews Street in his honour.
