= George Sharpe (politician) =

Canadian politician

George Edward Sharpe

36th Mayor of Winnipeg
- In office 1955–1956
- Preceded by: Garnet Coulter
- Succeeded by: Stephen Juba

Personal details
- Born: 6 November 1908 Winnipeg, Manitoba, Canada
- Died: 20 November 1985 (aged 77) Winnipeg, Manitoba, Canada

George Edward Sharpe (6 November 1908 – 20 November 1985) was a Canadian politician who served as an alderman and the 36th Mayor of Winnipeg.

He became a Winnipeg alderman in 1946 and served in that role until his election as Mayor for 1955 and 1956.

Sharpe's significant accomplishment as Mayor was the elimination of the city's streetcar service in September 1955, in the belief that "another big step has been taken in the progress of our city."
