= Katherine Ross Queen =

- Queen in 1932
- Born: Katherine Ross; 14 February 1885; Black Isle, Scotland
- Died: 10 September 1934 (aged 49); Winnipeg, Manitoba
- Spouse: John Queen (m. 1908)
- Children: Five

Katherine Ross Queen (14 February 1885 – 10 September 1934) was a Scottish-born feminist and socialist in Winnipeg, Manitoba.

== Early life ==
She was born Katherine Ross in on 14 February 1885 in Black Isle, Scotland, to a William Ross, but grew up in Inverness and then Glasgow. In that city, she became acquanted with socialism and the labour movement, and met John Queen, whom she would later marry.

In 1906, he journeyed to Canada, settling in Winnipeg where he found work as a cooper for the Prairie City Oil Company. The next year she followed him to Winnipeg and they wed on 25 June 1908.

== Activism ==
The couple quickly became active members of the moderate Social Democratic Party of Canada, and her husband was elected as a city alderman in 1916. During World War I, she joined the local branch of the Women's Labour League and campaigned for a minimum wage law for women, and against conscription.

After the war she was elected president of the Labour Women of Greater Winnipeg, which raised money to support male candidates representing socialist and labour parties in elections. She pushed to expand the group's role, supporting the establishment of family planning clinics and advocating for provincial medical insurance and government-run hospitals and clinics. (She also espoused eugenics policies, advocating for forced sterlization of those considered unfit to reproduce.)

Queen taught a Socialist Sunday School in Brooklands (near Winnipeg) from around 1919 until around 1930. She also helped establish a mothers' allowance auxiliary, which helped poor women—especially widows—to navigate bureaucracy in order to claim allowances to which they were entitled. In 1932 she represented the Independent Labour Party at a Calgary conference of agricultural, labour, and socialist parties.

== Personal life and death ==
Queen and her husband had two sons and three daughters, including journalist Katherine Gloria Queen-Hughes.

She suffered from a heart condition, and on 10 September 1934 she collapsed on a flight of stairs, and died in hospital due to heart failure. Her coffin was draped in a red flag, as she had wished.
