= Alexander McMicken =

Canadian politician

His Worship Alexander McMicken

6th Mayor of Winnipeg
- In office 1883–1883

Personal details
- Born: 27 August 1837 Queenstown, Upper Canada
- Died: 30 July 1916 (aged 78) Winnipeg, Manitoba, Canada
- Spouse: Margaret Johnson (m. 1859)
- Parent(s): Gilbert McMicken, Ann Theresa Duff

Alexander McMicken (27 August 1837 – 30 July 1916) was the sixth Mayor of Winnipeg in 1883.

After moving to Winnipeg in 1871, he established a banking career and the following year established a bank in his own name. After serving in two city council terms, he became as Mayor following the 1882 election.

He once lived at the J.C. Falls House at Roslyn Road, designated today as a historic building. McMicken Street in Winnipeg is named in his honour.
