= John Alexander MacDonell =

Canadian politician

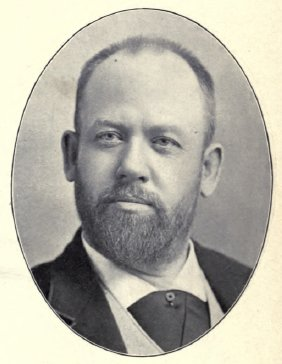

Member of the Canadian Parliament for Selkirk
- In office 1896–1900
- Preceded by: Thomas Mayne Daly
- Succeeded by: William McCreary
- Majority: 1

Member of the Legislative Assembly of Manitoba for Lorne
- In office 1886–1888

Personal details
- Born: November 22, 1854 Dundas, Canada West
- Died: October 27, 1912 (aged 57)
- Party: Liberal
- Other political affiliations: Liberal Party of Manitoba

John Alexander MacDonell (November 22, 1854 – October 27, 1912) was a Canadian politician.

Born in Dundas, Canada West, MacDonell was educated in Hamilton and Toronto. A civil engineer and contractor, he was Chief Clerk of the Manitoba Department of Public Works and Chief Engineer of Manitoba. At one time, he also was editor and owner of the Manitou Mercury; MacDonell also took part in the survey and construction of the Canadian Pacific Railway. A former member of the Dufferin Municipal Council, he was elected to the Legislative Assembly of Manitoba in 1886 as Liberal candidate for the riding of Lorne. He was defeated in 1888.

In 1896, he was elected to the House of Commons of Canada for the electoral district of Selkirk. A Liberal, he did not run in 1900 because of ill health.

He died in Kingston, Ontario in 1912.
