= Joseph Lecomte =

Canadian politician

Joseph J. Lecomte

Member of the Legislative Assembly of Manitoba for Cartier
- In office 1883–1886
- Preceded by: Gilbert McMicken
- Succeeded by: Thomas Gelley

Personal details
- Born: December 27, 1850 Henryville, Canada East
- Died: July 5, 1938 (aged 87) St. Boniface, Manitoba
- Party: Conservative
- Education: University of St. Joseph

Joseph Lecomte (December 27, 1850 – July 5, 1938) was a notary public and political figure in Manitoba. He represented Cartier from 1883 to 1886 in the Legislative Assembly of Manitoba as a Conservative.

He was born in Henryville, Quebec, the son of J.B. Lecomte and Marguerite Fortin, and was educated in Henryville, at St. Hyacinthe College and at the University of St. Joseph in Ottawa. He served as a Papal Zouave. In 1875, Lecomte married Anna Payment. He was registrar for Iberville, Manitoba from 1873 to 1883. Lecomte also served as mayor of St. Boniface. He died in St. Boniface and was buried in St. Norbert.
