= John Queen =

Canadian politician

Mayor of Winnipeg
- In office 1938–1942
- Preceded by: Ralph Webb
- Succeeded by: Frederick Warriner
- In office 1935–1936
- Preceded by: Frederick Warriner
- Succeeded by: Garnet Coulter

Member of the Legislative Assembly of Manitoba for Winnipeg
- In office June 29, 1920 – April 22, 1941

Leader of the Independent Labour Party of Manitoba
- In office 1923–1935
- Preceded by: Fred Dixon

Winnipeg City Councilor
- In office 1916–1921

Personal details
- Born: February 11, 1882 Lanarkshire, Scotland
- Died: July 15, 1946 (aged 64) Winnipeg, Manitoba
- Party: Independent Labour Party of Manitoba
- Other political affiliations: Social Democratic Party of Canada
- Spouse: Katherine Ross (m. 1908)

John Queen (February 11, 1882 – July 15, 1946) was a labour activist and Manitoba politician who was a leader of the Winnipeg General Strike, for which he served a year in prison.

He was a Labour city councillor in Winnipeg from 1916 to 1921; MLA for Winnipeg from 1920 to 1941; and the mayor of Winnipeg from 1935–1936 and 1938–1942. He was also the parliamentary leader of Manitoba's Independent Labour Party from 1923 to 1935.

== Background ==
Queen was born at Lanarkshire, Scotland in 1882, the son of John Queen and Jane Todd, both natives of Scotland. A cooper by trade, he arrived in Canada in 1906 with his younger brother William, moving into a rooming house at 259 Dorothy St., a stone's throw from the massive Canadian Pacific Railway yards where many working-class Scottish and English immigrants were then employed. He operated a horse-drawn delivery wagon for a laundry. On June 25, 1908, Queen married Katherine Ross, who had herself emigrated from Scotland in 1907.

By 1911 the family, which by then included a son John and a daughter Gloria (later Gloria Queen-Hughes, a prominent feminist and mayoral candidate), were living in the working-class neighbourhood of Weston.

== Political activism ==
Queen soon became involved in the radical politics of Winnipeg. He joined the Social Democratic Party of Canada in 1908, as the group was breaking away from the more doctrinaire Socialist Party of Canada. Queen's own variety of socialism was undogmatic, and was strongly influenced by the reform liberalism of John Stuart Mill.

== Elected political career ==
=== City council ===
Queen was elected to the Winnipeg City Council in 1916. He served on this body representing Ward Five until 1921. In this capacity, he argued for a more progressive tax system, and defended the rights of returning soldiers. He intended to run for federal office in 1917 but stood aside in the interest of labour unity.

Queen was a leading figure in the Winnipeg General Strike, and received a one-year jail sentence for "seditious conspiracy" in 1920. This did not hurt his popularity among the city's workers, and he was elected by Winnipeg voters to the Manitoba Legislature in 1920 and as mayor later.

=== Elected to provincial legislature ===
In June 1920, while still serving his prison term, he was elected to the Manitoba Legislature in the ten-member district of Winnipeg. After taking his seat in 1921, he supported a motion to allow "peaceful picketing" within the province; this motion was defeated.

The SDPC ceased to exist in 1920. Queen was re-elected in 1922 as an "Independent Workers" candidate.

He then joined the Independent Labour Party. When Fred Dixon resigned in 1923, Queen became the ILP's parliamentary leader.

Canada's labour movement experienced several setbacks in the late 1920s, and the ILP was not an especially strong electoral force during Queen's time as leader. Only three party members were elected in 1927, all from Winnipeg—Queen, William Ivens and Seymour Farmer.

The party fared slightly better in 1932, winning four seats in Winnipeg (electing Ivens, Farmer, Hyman and Queen) and electing Harold Lawrence in St. Boniface who beat out veteran Conservative MLA Joseph Bernier.

The party made little headway beyond urban areas, however, and remained a relatively small opposition group to the Progressive government of John Bracken.

=== Mayor ===
After failed attempts in 1932 and 1933, Queen was elected mayor of Winnipeg in 1934 (defeating John McKerchar, the candidate of the city's business interests). Queen again pushed for progressive taxation, and spoke out against a proposed tax reduction for various businesses within the city. As mayor, he passed a tax reform bill that provided for a significant increase in the city's revenues.

Queen served as mayor from 1935 to 1936, and again from 1937 to 1942. He did not endorse many explicitly socialist policies during his period in office, instead he favoured a general programme of civic improvement. Queen's housing reforms were upheld as a model for the rest of the nation. He held leading positions in the Canadian Federation of Mayors and Municipalities.

=== Later political career ===
Queen continued to serve in the provincial legislature during his tenure as mayor, though he turned over the leadership of the party to Seymour Farmer in 1935.

Along with the rest of the ILP caucus, he became affiliated with the Cooperative Commonwealth Federation in 1933. His defeat in the provincial election of 1941 seems to have been unexpected.

Queen was also defeated when he ran for re-election as Winnipeg's mayor in 1942, He lost another bid in 1944. Opposition from Winnipeg's Communists was undoubtedly a contributing factor in both cases.

He died at home in Winnipeg on July 15, 1946.

== Notes ==
Preceded by Ralph Webb	Mayor of Winnipeg, MB; 1935-1936	Succeeded by Frederick Warriner
Preceded by Frederick Warriner	Mayor of Winnipeg, MB; 1937-1942	Succeeded by Garnet Coulter
