= Horace Wilson (politician) =

Canadian politician

Mayor Horace Wilson
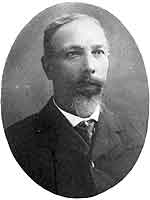

18th Mayor of Winnipeg
- In office 1900–1900
- Preceded by: A.J. Andrews
- Succeeded by: John Arbuthnot

Personal details
- Born: 24 April 1848 Canada West
- Died: c. 1903 unknown

Horace Wilson (24 April 1848 – c. 1903) was a Canadian politician who served as an alderman and was the 18th Mayor of Winnipeg.

Wilson was a painter who moved to Winnipeg no later than 1889 where he began a joint venture with Simon Betrand in the business of oil and painting. He became a Winnipeg alderman around 1895 and served in that role until his election as Mayor for 1900. In August 1903, Wilson left Winnipeg under mysterious circumstances and is thought to have died later that year.

The City of Winnipeg named Wilson Street in his honour.
