= Edward Parnell (politician) =

Mayor Edward Parnell
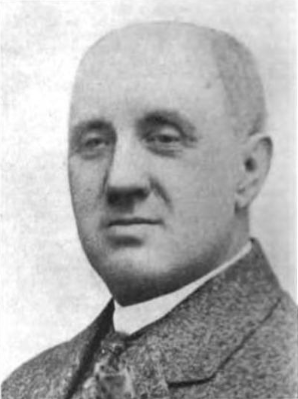

28th Mayor of Winnipeg
- In office 1921 – 1922 (died in office)
- Preceded by: Charles Frederick Gray
- Succeeded by: Frank Oliver Fowler

Personal details
- Born: 8 April 1859 Dover, England
- Died: 9 June 1922 (aged 63) Victoria, British Columbia

Edward Parnell (8 April 1859 – 9 June 1922) was a Canadian politician, the 28th Mayor of Winnipeg from 1921 until his death in office.

== Biography ==
Edward Parnell was born in Dover, England on 8 April 1859. He came to Canada while still young and settled in London, where he worked as a baker and served 11 years on the city council. He ran unsuccessfully for the position of London's mayor, losing to Adam Beck. He moved to Winnipeg in 1909, where he established a bread-making company in partnership with John Tully Speirs. The company operated a second bakery in London. He married Mary Jane Harwood and the couple had seven children. From 1918 to 1919, Parnell was president of the Canadian Manufacturers Association and, from 1920 to 1921, was president of the Winnipeg Board of Trade.

His name is commemorated by Parnell Avenue in Winnipeg.

His former home has been designed as a historic building by the city of Winnipeg.
