= Gilbert McMicken =

Canadian politician

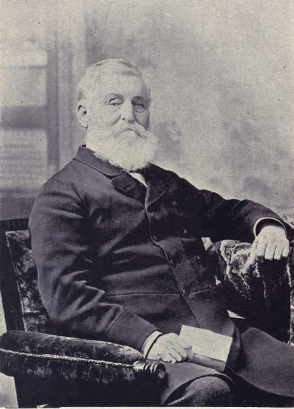

Mayor of Clifton, Canada West
- In office 1856–1857
- Preceded by: None
- Succeeded by: Frederic William Hill

Member of the Legislative Assembly of Manitoba for Cartier
- In office 1879–1883
- Preceded by: None
- Succeeded by: Joseph Lecomte

5th Speaker of the Legislative Assembly of Manitoba
- In office 1880–1882
- Preceded by: John Sifton
- Succeeded by: Alexander Murray

Personal details
- Born: October 13, 1813 London, England, or Glenluce, Scotland
- Died: March 7, 1891 (aged 77) Winnipeg, Manitoba
- Children: Alexander McMicken
- Occupation: customs collector and notary public

Gilbert McMicken (October 13, 1813 – March 7, 1891) was a Canadian businessman and political figure. He served on the Council of Keewatin the governing body of the District of Keewatin from 1876 to 1877.

He was born in England or Scotland in 1813 and came to Upper Canada in 1832. He entered the business of forwarding goods at Chippawa in the Niagara region. He later moved to Queenston where he became a customs collector and a notary public. He formed a forwarding company there in partnership with James Hamilton. He was elected to the council for the Niagara District and then to the council for Niagara Township, where he was chosen to be reeve. He moved to Clifton (later Niagara Falls) in 1851 where he served several terms as postmaster and became the town's first mayor.

In 1857, he was elected to the Legislative Assembly of the Province of Canada for Welland. He was appointed excise officer in Windsor in 1864. Later that year, he was named stipendiary magistrate and justice of the peace throughout Canada West. McMicken was charged with collecting intelligence for the government during the period leading up to the Fenian raids. His injection of spies into the Fenian organization helped defuse this threat. In 1869, he was named commissioner for the Dominion Police, later merged into the Royal Canadian Mounted Police.

In 1871, he went to Winnipeg to help establish government offices there. McMicken took on the role of lands agent and had to deal with the thorny problem of distributing land in Manitoba. He later lobbied for the incorporation of Winnipeg as a town and helped keep it on the route chosen for the transcontinental railroad.

McMicken was appointed to the Council of Keewatin serving as one of six members appointed on November 25, 1876. He served on the council until he was asked to resign along with the rest of the council April 16, 1877

In 1879, he was elected to the Legislative Assembly of Manitoba. He served as speaker for the provincial assembly from 1880 to 1882. He also served on the council for the University of Manitoba. He supplemented his pension income by working as an insurance agent in Winnipeg. He died there in 1891.
