= Garnet Coulter =

Canadian politician

Garnet Coulter QC

35th Mayor of Winnipeg
- In office 1943–1954
- Preceded by: John Queen
- Succeeded by: George Sharpe

Personal details
- Born: August 1882 Dominion City, Manitoba, Canada
- Died: 8 October 1975 (aged 93)
- Spouse: Jessica Allan (m. 1948)
- Profession: lawyer

Garnet Coulter QC (August 1882 – 8 October 1975) was a Canadian politician serving as an alderman and the 35th Mayor of Winnipeg.

After graduating with a Bachelor of Law degree from the University of Manitoba, Coulter served as a lawyer in Winnipeg since 1907. He joined the Winnipeg School Board in 1924, serving as its chairman in 1932 and 1933.

In 1936, he left the school board and became a Winnipeg alderman for Ward Two. He was elected Winnipeg's Mayor in 1942, holding that position from 1943 until 1954. He established the Manitoba Flood Relief Fund following the 1950 Red River Flood.

Coulter remained single until 1948 when he married Jessica Allan, the first full-time Executive Director of the Canadian Federation of Mayors and Municipalities
