= David Dyson (naturalist) =

British naturalist, scientific collector, curator and weaver (1823–1856)

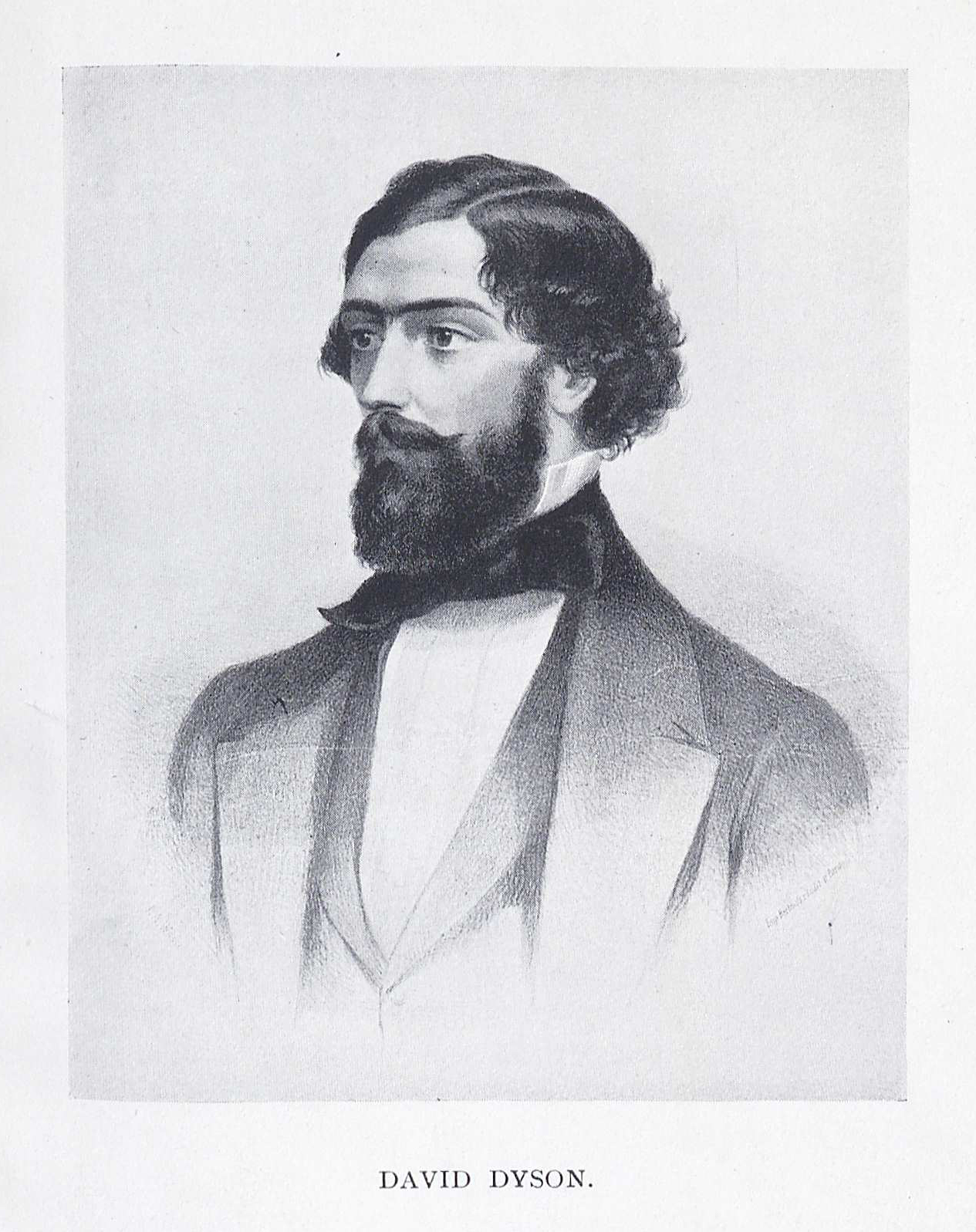
- Lithograph of Dyson from c. 1857
- Born: April 1823; Oldham, U.K.
- Died: 10 December 1856 (age 33); Rusholme, U.K.
- Occupations: Weaver; Entomologist; Conchologist; Ornithologist; Scientific Collector; Natural History Curator
- Employer(s): British Museum; Edward Smith-Stanley, 13th Earl of Derby; Hugh Cuming
- Scientific career
- Workplaces: Knowsley Hall; Salford Museum

David Dyson (1823–1856) was a British naturalist, scientific collector, curator and weaver who travelled and collected specimens in the United States, Central America, and Venezuela during the 1840s.

== Biography ==
=== Family and education ===
Dyson was born in Oldham, England in April 1823. His exact birth date was not recorded in parish records, but he was baptised on 24 April 1823 at St Peter's Chapel in Oldham. His parents were John Dyson, a weaver and spinner, and his wife Mary. David had older brothers named John (a clerk, born c. 1815) and James (a musician, born c. 1817); he had a younger brother named Amos (who was also a musician like James, c. 1825-1860). The Dyson family lived at Broadway Lane, which was then part of the main road between Oldham and Ashton.

David Dyson began his career as a factory worker, specifically a weaver. He became passionate about entomology and spent his spare time and money pursuing the hobby. Dyson was reportedly inspired by his father, who also loved natural history. Dyson had begun by exploring his own local area: he said in 1850 on the subject of shell collecting that he had searched for specimens in the districts around Manchester for "many years."

Dyson's early biographer Mrs. Ives of Stockport, England (c.1900) asserted that Dyson was illiterate as he had told the British Museum authorities that he distinguished between natural history objects using a "mode of writing... a hieroglyphic marking understood only to himself." His possible illiteracy is considered to be unlikely by his later biographers John Wilfred Jackson (1908) and John Calhoun (2011) as they had seen surviving documents written by Dyson. A bundle of letters written by Dyson and his correspondents, belonging to Dyson's nephew David, was loaned to Jackson about 1912 and some of the letters were serialized in the journal Lancashire and Cheshire Naturalist. As Jackson pointed out, "the letters have proved beyond a doubt that Dyson was so far from being illiterate that he was in constant correspondence with a large number of people."

Mrs. Ives said that Dyson approached people from "various tribes" on his travels to seek information and assistance in finding plants and other natural history specimens, reportedly playing a penny whistle as he approached a camp of Indians to signal that his intentions were not hostile. Ives does not specify whether that refers to Dyson contacting Native American people in North America, or indigenous people in Central America and Venezuela - but it may indicate that Dyson sought and valued local intelligence on his voyages.

=== Travels ===
==== United States of America, 1843 ====
Dyson's initial passage across the Atlantic was funded with his savings and a gift of money from one of his older brothers. Dyson arrived in the US with "only a few shillings", but proceeded to travel across the Allegheny Mountains and got as far as St. Louis, Missouri:

John Calhoun said that the route implies that Dyson followed the Ohio and Mississippi River valleys. Dyson sustained himself financially by selling part of the collections he was making to local museums as he traveled. In Ohio, likely in the vicinity of Cincinnati, he collected examples of a butterfly which was described by Edward Doubleday (1811–1849) in 1847 as the new-to-science species Melitaea nycteis.

Dyson spent about a year in the US and returned to the U.K. with 18,000 specimens of insects, birds, plants and shells. A naturalist, Hugh Strickland (1811–1853) attempted to engage Dyson to make another collecting trip to the USA on behalf of himself and a consortium of gentlemen, but the negotiations failed.

==== Central America, 1844 ====
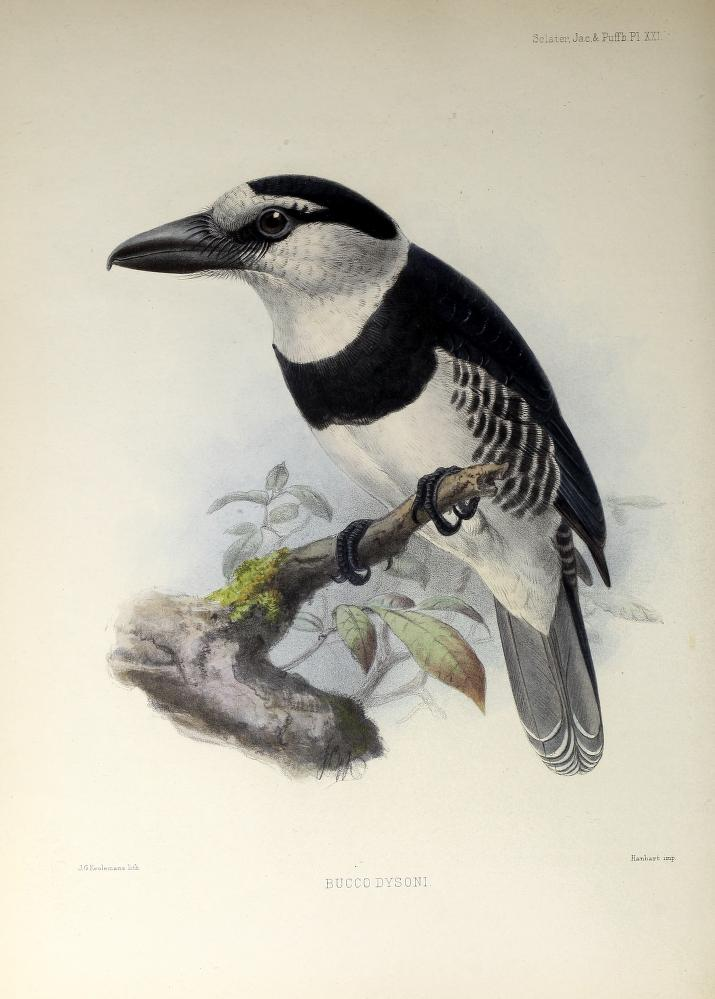
Bucco dysoni (now Notharchus hyperrhynchus) illustrated by John Gerrard Keulemans, described by Philip Lutley Sclater from a specimen collected in Honduras by Dyson

After the success of his trip to the eastern United States, Dyson was contracted by the British Museum to collect in Central America. Dyson was also sponsored by Edward Smith-Stanley the thirteenth Earl of Derby, the natural history collector Hugh Cuming, the Zoological Society of London and Manchester Botanical Gardens. Dyson left the U.K. on 17 September 1844 and arrived in Belize on 3 November 1844.

Although contemporary publications often give Dyson's collecting locality as "Honduras," or "Honduras Bay" Dyson is known to have visited the British settlement at Honduras / British Honduras, now Belize. [note: Belize had formally become a 'Colony of British Honduras' in 1840, so it is possible that the terms 'Honduras' and 'Belize' were being used interchangeably around this time, or that Dyson did visit both Honduras and Belize. The available information in the public domain leaves this issue uncertain. This article says 'Honduras' or 'Belize' verbatim as it is given in the original references, which in one case also include co-usage of both "Honduras" in conjunction with "at some distance from Balize"].

In Belize Dyson suffered from sunstroke and other ailments which caused his eventual return home, but his trip was successful. Dyson collected insects, shells, birds, reptiles, mammals and plants of the order Orchidaecae. Many of the specimens (but not the plants) became part of the British Museum collection.

Bats collected by Dyson including the species Sturnira lilium and Rhogeessa tumida were the first from Belize to be scientifically documented.

A female example of the beetle Chalcolepidus rugatus collected by Dyson in Belize was later cited by George Charles Champion in Godman and Salvin's Biologia Centrali Americana. Dyson's specimen of the beetle Tarpela reticulata from Honduras was stated by Champion to still be the only known example of that species in the British Museum's collection more than forty years after Dyson had recorded it.

Dyson also collected some living specimens on this voyage, including a squirrel and a lone female ocellated turkey Meleagris ocellata, which somewhat disappointed his patron the thirteenth Earl of Derby who had hoped to acquire a breeding pair of the turkeys for his aviary at Knowlsey. After the death of the thirteenth Earl, the turkey collected by Dyson was sold to Charles Jamrach for £15.

Dyson stayed in "Honduras" until the latter part of 1845.

==== Venezuela, 1846-1847 ====
Accompanied by his brother Amos, Dyson left the U.K. on 9 March 1846 and on their Atlantic crossing the brothers entertained their fellow ship passengers by playing music. Dyson and Amos arrived at Venezuela on 22 April 1846. The Dysons spent about 11–12 months collecting beetles, flies, butterflies, moths, shells, birds and plants.

On this voyage Dyson collected the Type specimen of the butterfly Papilio zagreus Doubleday, 1847, described by Edward Doubleday as: "without exception the most remarkable Papilio yet found in the New World." In the mountains of Caracas Dyson collected specimens of the butterfly Corades enyo, which was rarely seen in the locality. Dyson collected Venezuelan Diptera specimens for the British Museum which were later described by Francis Walker, including some new-to-science species e.g. Trichopoda umbra Walker 1849, Tachina aequabilis [now known as Cryptopalpus aequabilis (Walker, 1849)] and Sarcophaga jejuna [now known as Microcerella jejuna Walker].

At Caracas towards the end of April 1846, Dyson was introduced to Belford Hinton Wilson (1803–1858), Queen Victoria's Charge D'Affaires at Venezuela, who gave him a letter of introduction to the Dutch Consul, who was also a naturalist. More prosaically, in Dyson's letter home to his brother John from La Guayra [La Guaira] on 2 May 1846 he noted "Amos has been bit by flies very much."

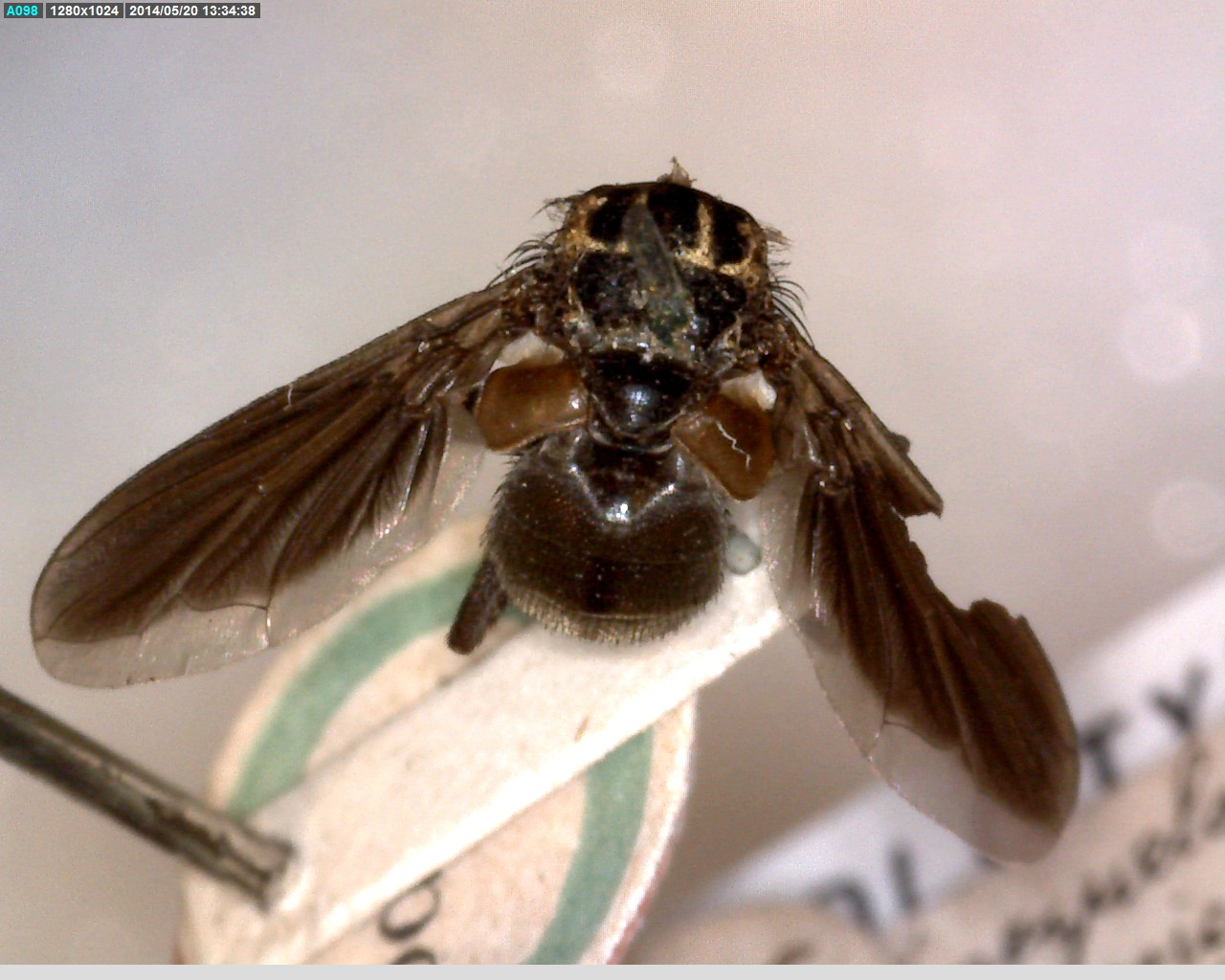
Hairy-legged fly Trichopoda umbra Walker, 1849: Holotype specimen collected by David Dyson in Venezuela [BMNH(E)914345]

Near the end of May 1846 Dyson visited Cumaná, the capital of Sucre State, where he collected Chondropoma and Columbella shells.

At a place named "Acienda Gallipan" near Galipán where the brothers stayed c. the beginning of June 1846 Dyson sent out the local enslaved farm workers to collect for him, speaking what little Spanish he knew to talk with them. At Galipán Dyson remarked "we could hear the howling and groaning of the Jaguars and Pumas every day." Only Amos Dyson actually saw a Puma, which crossed a woodland pathway before him; Amos and the cat both escaped unharmed.

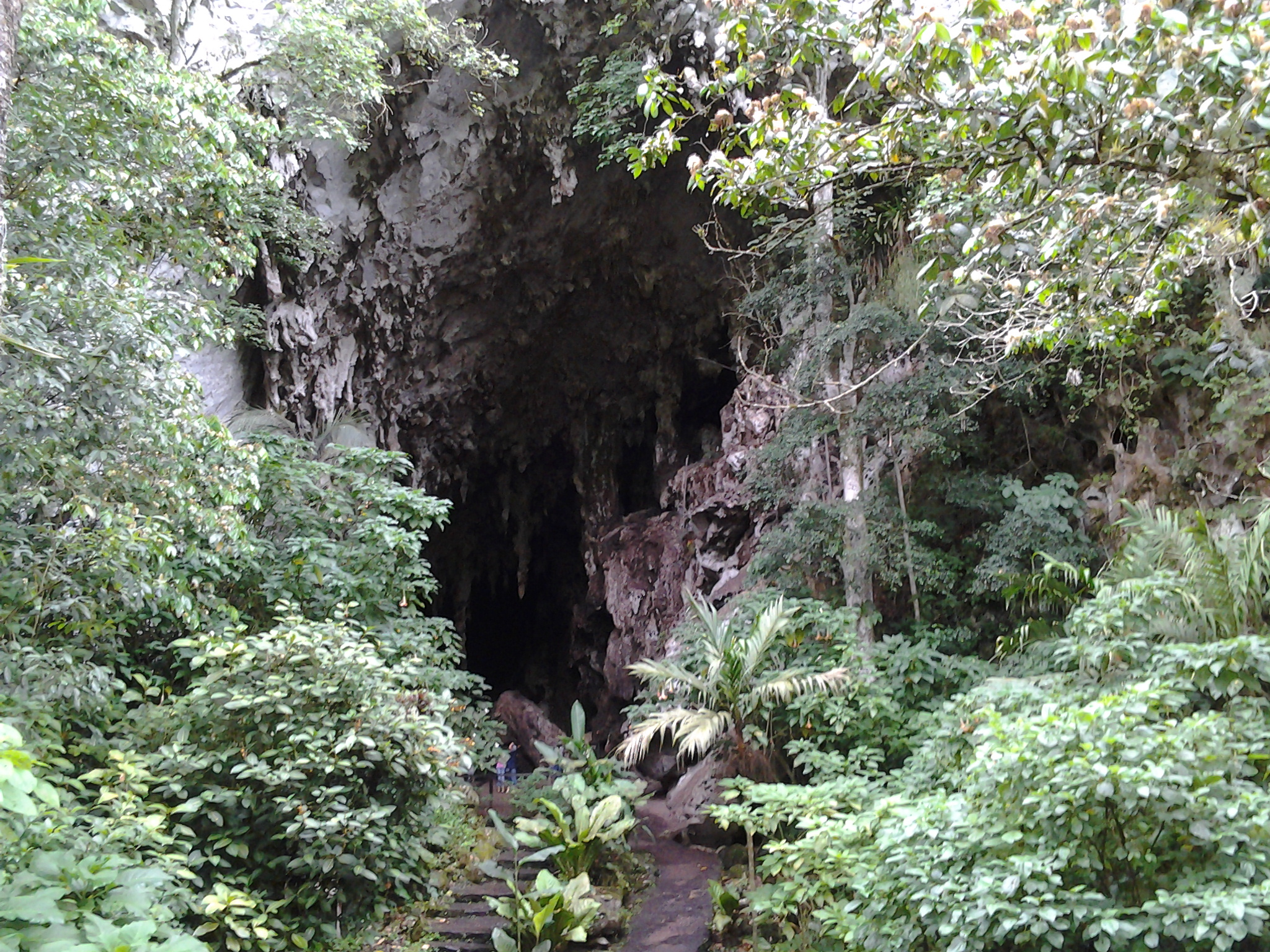
Entrance to the Cueva del Guácharo National Park; the Dysons visited the park near the end of July 1846

The Dyson brothers experienced difficulties and accidents on this trip: local children at Cumaná visited their accommodation, seemingly to sell natural history specimens, but then tried to steal from them; the men they had hired to convey them in a boat to Punto Ria threatened the Dysons with violence and they and their hired servant had to brandish guns and a knife in order to be ferried back to Cumaná. The servant and his horse slipped down a precipice on the way from Cumanacoa to St. Antonia and were nearly killed: Amos Dyson was able to reach and rescue them, but the two men and the horse then spent an exposed stormy night up to their knees in water. David Dyson injured his legs while collecting birds at the Cave of Guacharo, and the damage took months to heal. The Dysons were also travelling in areas of heightened military activity, due to the 1846 Venezuelan peasant insurrection.

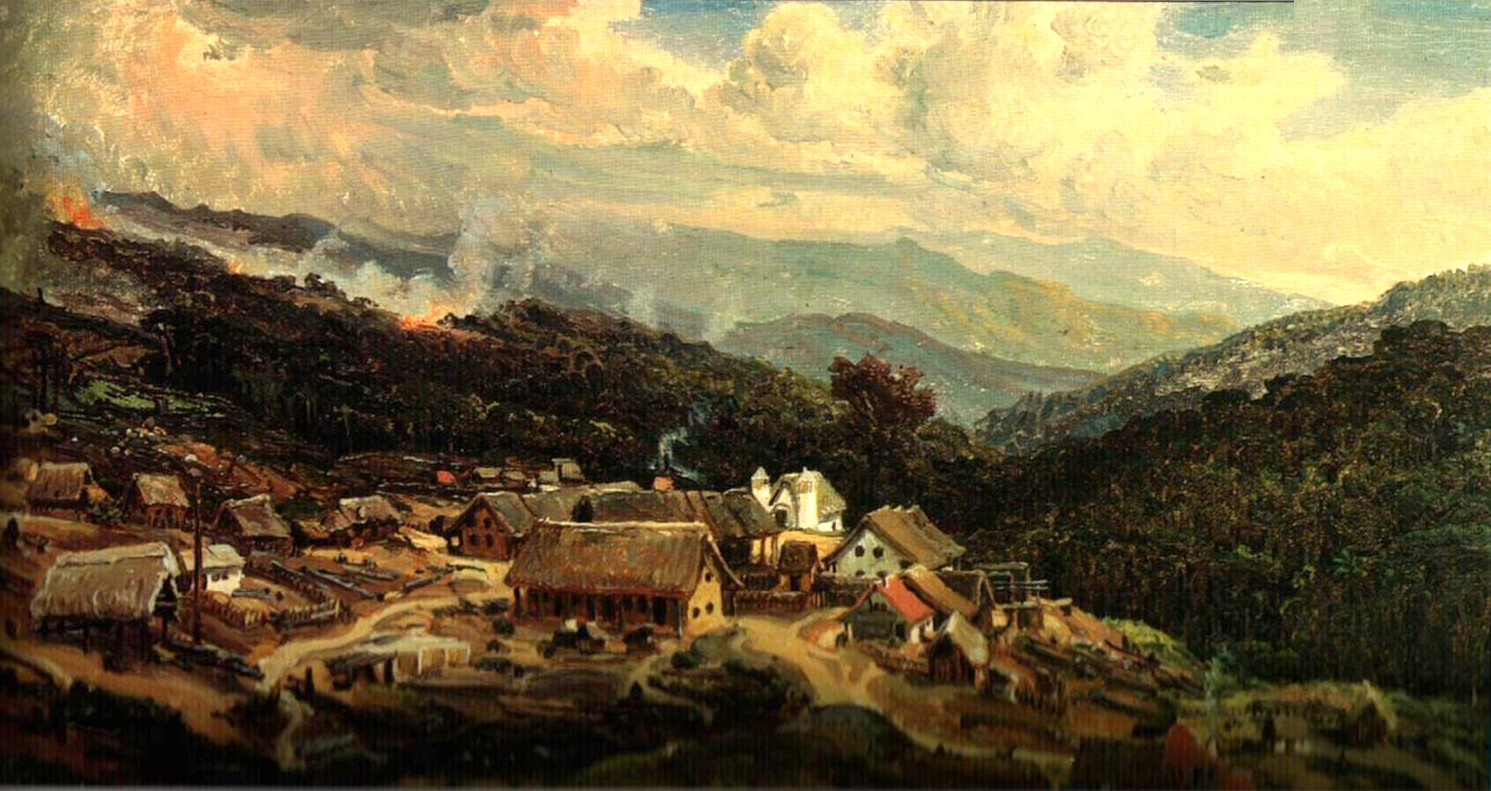
Colonia Tovar in Venezuela, painted by Ferdinand Bellermann in 1844, two years before David Dyson visited the area

Dyson collected a pair of lizards near "Colonia de Tovar", Tovar Colony in Aragua State, a then-relatively inaccessible German agricultural colony founded in 1843, close to a tree named "Grand Cedro" the largest known tree species in Venezuela. Dyson's lizards were initially thought by John Edward Gray to be a new species, Argalia olivacea Gray 1847, but this species was later synonymised with Anadia marmorata (Gray, 1846).

The Dysons' violins were broken on their travels. When they sent them home for repair, Dyson stuffed one instrument with contraband cigars as a gift for his brother John, but it was seized by Customs officials.

==== Unrealised and possible voyages ====
In February 1848 Dyson had spoken with the British Museum authorities about a possible trip to the interior of Persia, but he did not undertake such a voyage.

In May 1851, Dyson offered to travel to Sardinia on behalf of the thirteenth Earl of Derby to collect living Mouflon sheep which the Earl had been offered by the Sardinian authorities. The Earl had hoped that the trip would be good for Dyson's health, but the Earl himself was ailing and died only a month later. The fourteenth Earl of Derby was in possession of a Sardinian Mouflon ewe in February 1852 which he donated to the Zoological Society of London, but it is not clear whether this sheep was brought to the U.K. by Dyson.

=== Manchester shells guidebook, 1850 ===
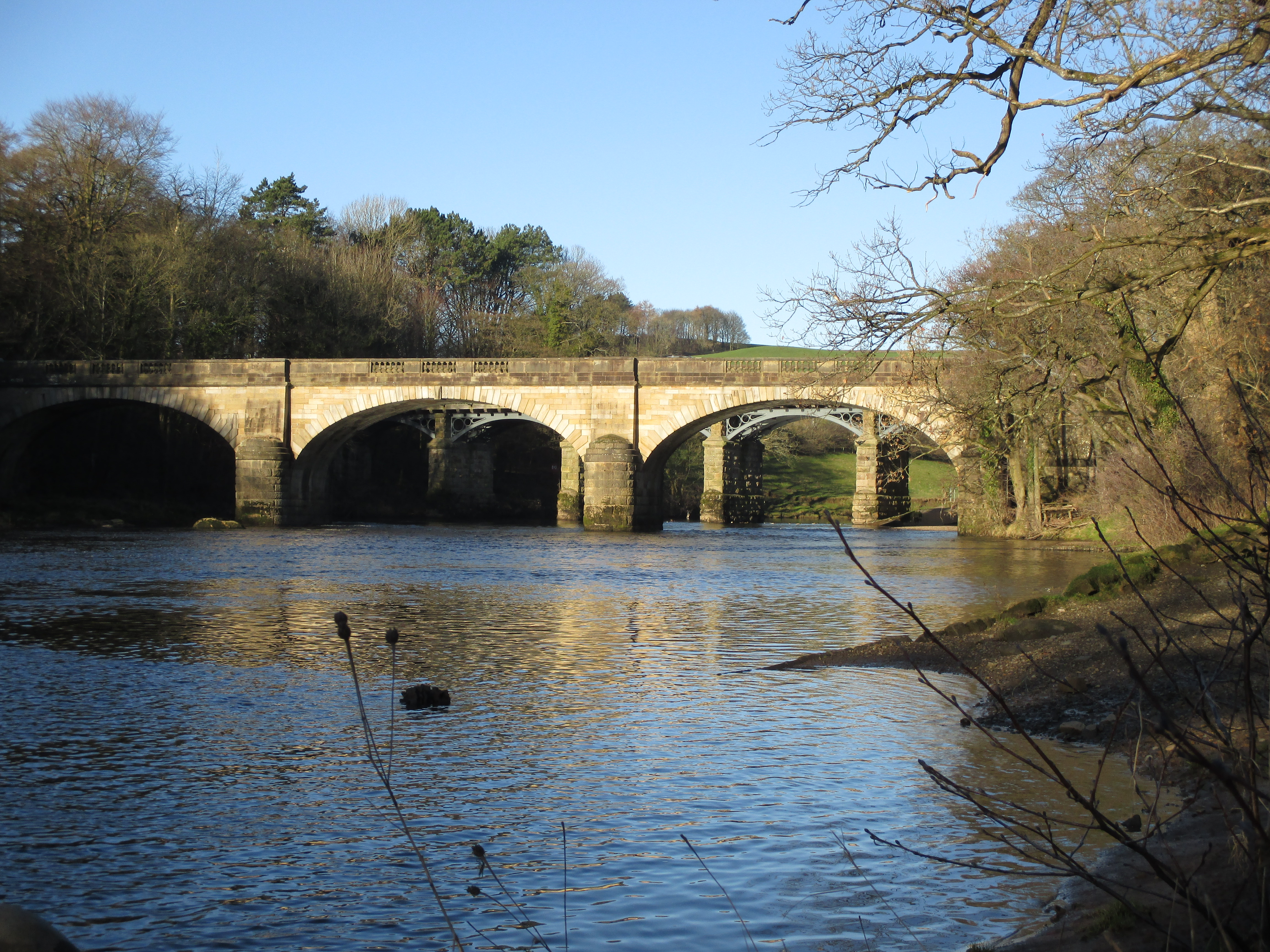
The Crook o' Lune viaduct (east) at Caton, constructed in 1849: Dyson collected shells in the area around the time he wrote his books

In 1850 Dyson published a book about the shells that could be found in the vicinity of Manchester: The Land and Fresh Water Shells of the Districts Around Manchester: With Their Particular Localities. While looking for shell specimens, Dyson had travelled at least as far from Manchester as Llandudno in North Wales [a distance of about 65 miles / 105 km]. Many of the collecting localities detailed by Dyson were found in features of the Victorian industrial landscape like millponds, railway cuttings and canals. In 1849 some railway navvies working near the River Lune at Caton had observed Dyson collecting the freshwater mussel Alasmodon margaritferus: after Dyson had left the area, they tried to collect the shellfish themselves. The workmen's manager later bumped into Dyson at a hotel in Warrington, and remembered him for the distraction he had caused.

Dyson said that his favourite location for entomological study and walking was The Brushes, Stalybridge, an area which would later be in the vicinity of the Brushes Reservoir (built in the 1870s). Dyson was a Christian and applied his faith to his study of shells, which he felt reflected the wisdom of God: 'His care is not confined to the higher orders of creation; but that He regards equally the little occupant of the shell which floats in the water, or the monarch of the forest.' (Dyson 1850, pgs iv-v)

=== Work as a Natural History Curator ===
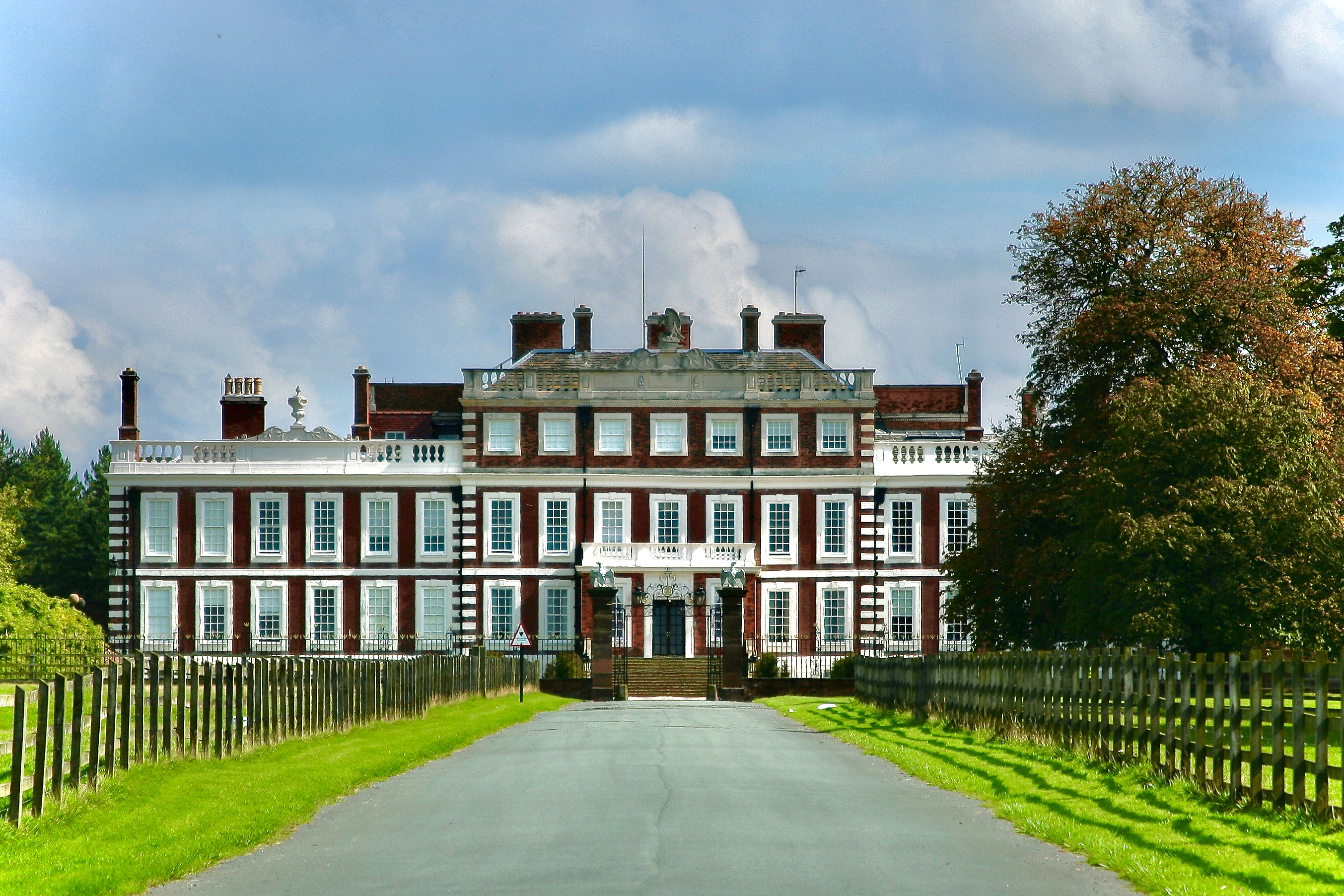
Knowsley Hall

Dyson succeeded Louis Fraser as a curator at Knowsley Hall, looking after the natural history collections of Edward Smith-Stanley, the thirteenth Earl of Derby. Dyson was resident at Knowsley Hall on the night of the 1851 England Census. Dyson had a good working relationship with the Earl, based upon samples of their letters. Dyson's employment ended after the thirteenth Earl died in 1851 and his son Edward the 14th Earl disposed of much of Knowsley's museum collections. Dyson himself instructed the auctioneer Mister Capes about the sale of the collections of birds, insects, archaeological and ethnographic material. Part of the 13th Earl's zoology collection was bequeathed to the people of Liverpool and became the foundation of the Derby Museum, now the World Museum in Liverpool.

Dyson worked for some time circa 1847 arranging the shell collection of Hugh Cuming at Cuming's home at 80 Gower Street, London. While working for Cuming Dyson was in contact with John Gould, to whom he sold a Crane specimen. Gould sent Dyson some rare Australian shells which had been collected by one of his recently deceased agents [the person is not named in Dyson's letters, but in context Gould's Australian deceased shell collector was likely John Gilbert or Johnston Drummond, both of whom had died in 1845].

At the time of his death, Dyson was working at the Salford Museum.

=== Death ===
Dyson's health was described as "shattered" as a consequence of the hardships and risks taken from his overseas collecting trips, particularly through disorders he had contracted in the swamps of Belize. He died on 10 December 1856 at the age of 33, at the residence of his brother John, Woodbine Cottage at Rusholme. David's cause of death was described as ulceration of the larynx. He was laid to rest at Manchester General Cemetery.

In 1857 David Dyson's friends advertised that they hoped to make lithograph copies of Dyson's portrait, with subscriptions to be raised by the artist John Angelo Wasse (1817–1885) [this is likely to be the portrait of Dyson featured above].

== Dyson's collections and legacy ==
Dyson left a personal collection of 20000 shells, representing between 8000 and 9,000 species, which were offered for sale after his death. Amos Dyson and later the conchologist Frederick Price Marrat (1820–1904) were in charge of the sale, but the disposal of David's shell collection was not a quick one and the collection was listed for sale from 1857 until 1859. Amos died in 1860. More of David Dyson's collections including 38 cases of butterflies and moths, four cases of beetles, hummingbirds preserved in spirit, reptiles, cabinets, equipment, books and cigars were offered for sale in 1858 and 1859. Despite his enquiries, by 1913 Dyson's biographer John Wilfrid Jackson was not able to discover what had become of Dyson's personal shell, bird or insect collections.

An investigation by the botanists James Britten (1846–1924) and Charles Bailey (1838–1924) circa 1905 indicated that none of Dyson's plant specimens had come to the British Museum or Kew Gardens. Britten was dismissive of Dyson's career, having taken umbrage at an alleged Dyson quote from Dyson's biographer Mrs Ives: "in speaking of the British Museum people, he said they were a set of prejudiced and dried up old fogies." Contradicting that, Dyson's letters indicate that he had a good working relationship with British Museum Lepidoptera curator Edward Doubleday, and Doubleday spoke of Dyson highly: "[his] indefatigable exertions as a collector merit the highest praise." Dyson did complain about the botanical patrons of his Venezuela trip making unreasonable demands, writing to his brother John: "These people are such a set of men that they would not be pleased if we would send them half of South America," but these patrons cannot have been British Museum or Kew employees as Dyson did not collect plants for those institutions.

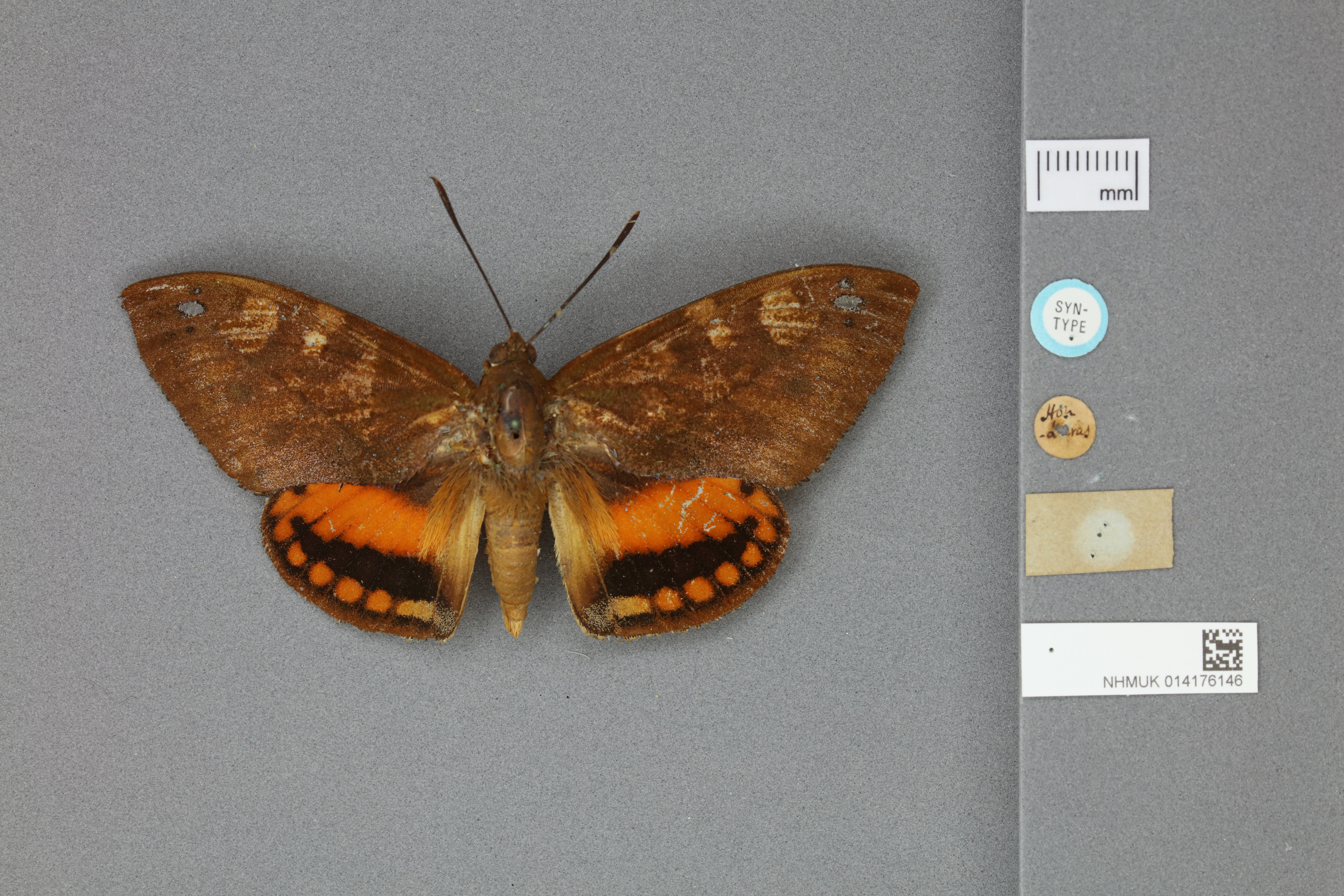
A syntype specimen of Castnia inca [now known as Athis inca (Walker, 1849)] collected in Honduras by David Dyson; from the collection of the Natural History Museum, London (NHMUK014176146)

Dyson's Manchester Guardian obituary suggests that during his lifetime, he was generally held in good esteem by his fellow naturalists: "notwithstanding early disadvantages, his acquirements were considerable; his kind and gentlemanly bearing gathering about him a large circle of highly cultivated men, whose esteem he retained to the last." John Wilfred Jackson said after having posthumously come to know and respect Dyson and his work: "it is a cause of great surprise that his work of collection should so far have been forgotten in the places the most indebted to him to lead to his identity being even questioned." Jackson himself proved to be a valuable preserver of David Dyson's legacy through making contact with Dyson's family and publishing his letters.

John Gould eulogized Dyson, among other deceased ornithologists, in his book An Introduction to the Trochilidae, Or Family of Humming-birds (1861): "the travellers of all these countries have shown equal intrepidity in their endeavours to bring to light the hidden treasures of the great primaeval forests of the New World."

Specimens of insects, shells, birds, and reptiles collected by Dyson on his voyages are preserved in the collection of the Natural History Museum, London.

== Selected animals named for David Dyson ==
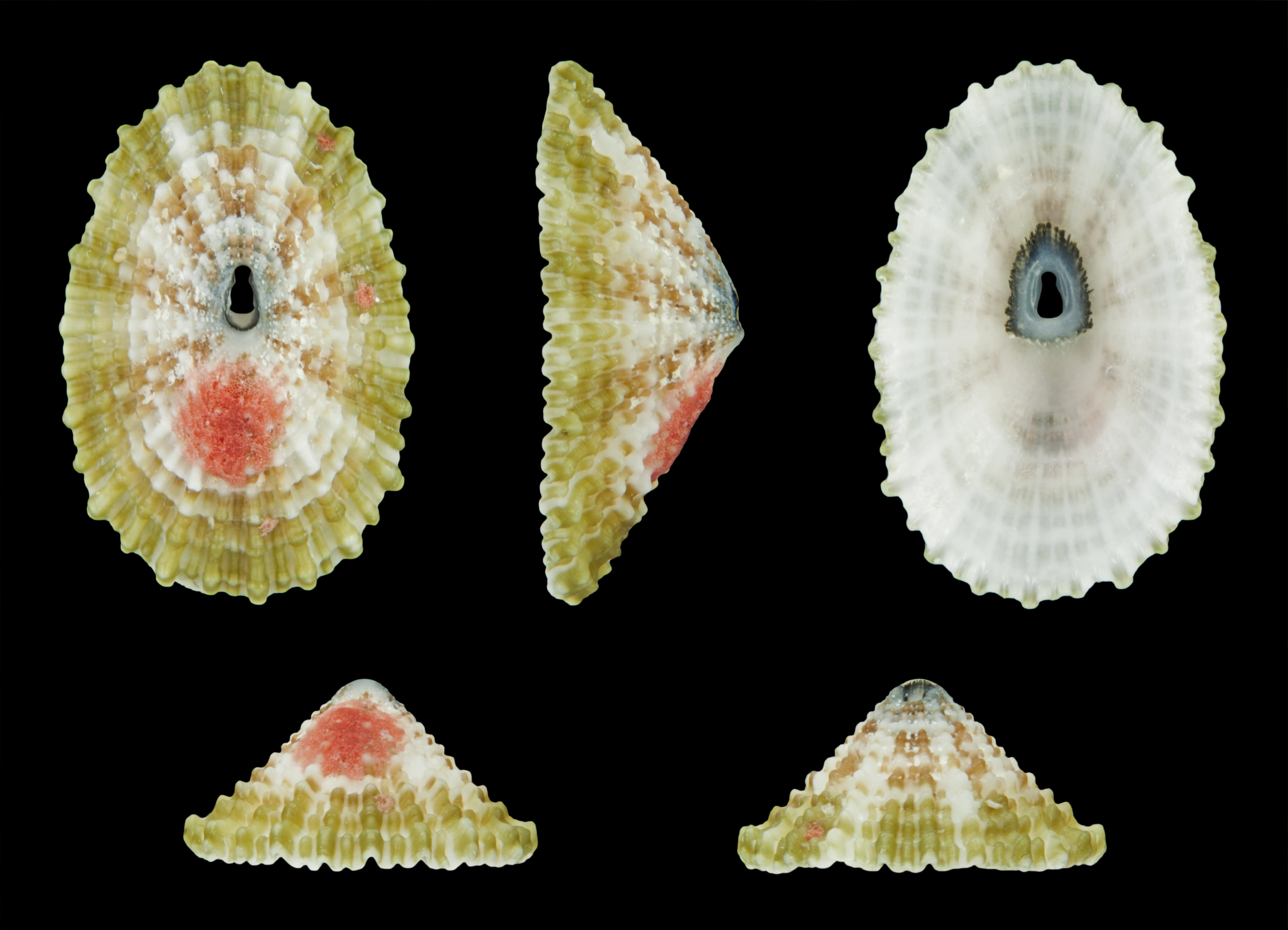
An example of Dyson's Keyhole Limpet (Diodora dysoni), a species which was found in the Dominican Republic, photographed by H. Zell

- The land snail Achatina dysoni [now Stretostyla dysoni (Pfieffer, 1847)] was named by Louis Pfieffer from a specimen found by Dyson under decayed leaves at Honduras.
- The sea snail Mangelia dysoni [now Tenaturris dysoni (Reeve, 1846)], common name "Dyson's Mangelia", was named by Lovell Reeve from specimens found by Dyson on the sands at Honduras. Dyson's specimens were originally part of Hugh Cuming's collection and later became part of the Natural History Museum collection.
- The butterfly Euterpe dysoni [now Leodonta dysoni (Doubleday 1847)] was named by Edward Doubleday from a specimen Dyson had collected in Venezuela.
- "Dyson's Keyhole Limpet" Diodora dysoni (Reeve, 1850) was originally described by Lovell Reeve as Fissurella dysoni, from specimens Dyson had collected in Honduras.
- The puffbird Bucco dysoni [possibly synonymised with Notharchus hyperrhynchus] was named by Phiiip Lutley Sclater in 1855 for a specimen collected at Honduras by Dyson.
