= List of mayors of Winnipeg =

Mayor of Winnipeg
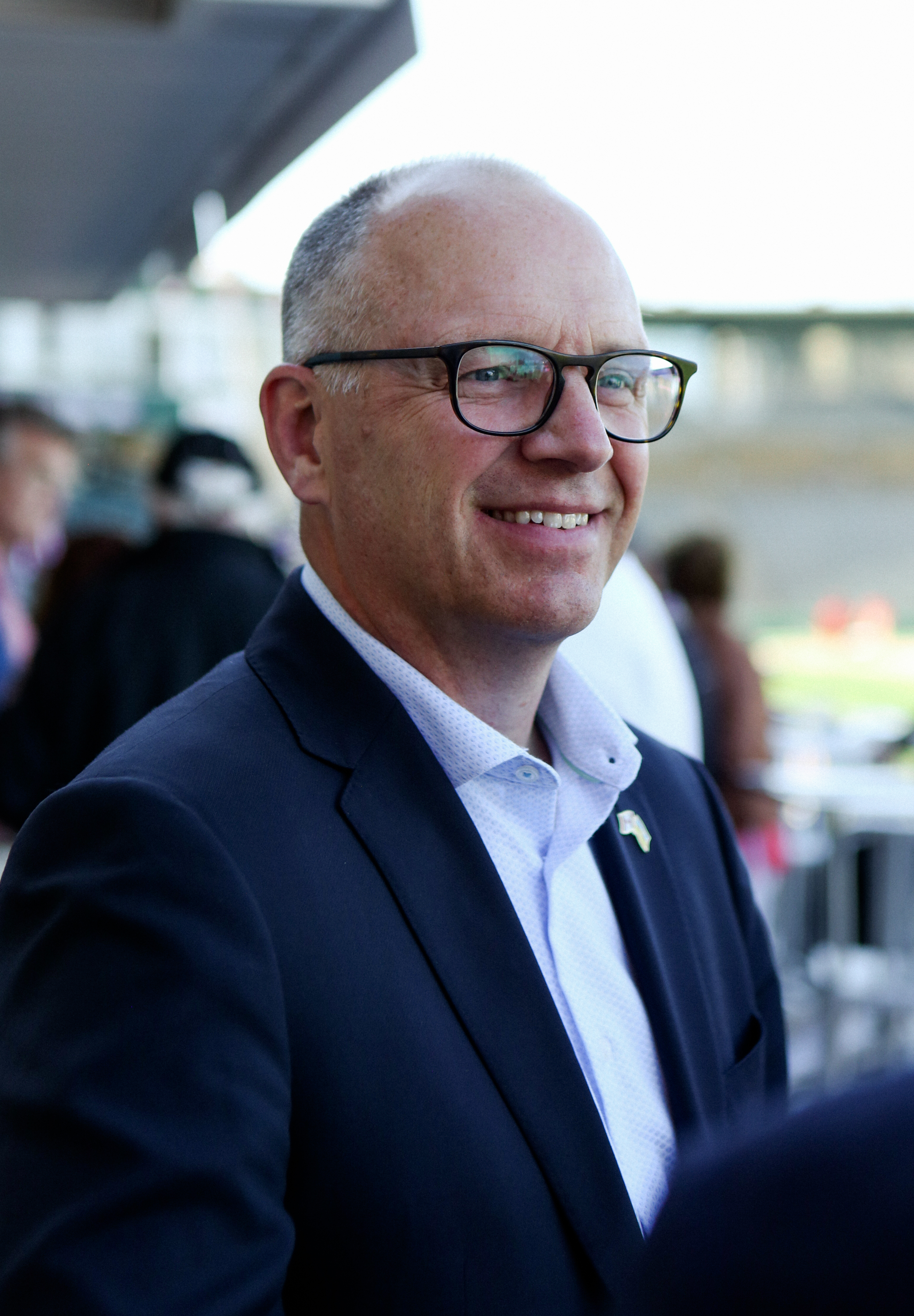
- Incumbent; Scott Gillingham since November 1, 2022
- Style: His Worship; Mayor (informal)
- Member of: Winnipeg City Council
- Seat: Winnipeg City Hall
- Constituting instrument: The City of Winnipeg Charter
- Formation: 1874
- First holder: Francis Evans Cornish

The mayor of Winnipeg is a member of Winnipeg City Council, but does not represent a ward. The position of mayor was created in 1873 following the incorporation of Winnipeg. Since 1998, the term of office has been for four years.

The 44th and current mayor of Winnipeg is Scott Gillingham, elected on October 26, 2022.

== History ==
The position of mayor was created in 1873 following the incorporation of Winnipeg (renamed from Fort Garry), now the provincial capital of Manitoba. From 1874 to 1955, the mayor of Winnipeg was elected for one year only; then, from 1955 until 1972, the term of office was extended to two years.

The election of the first City Council was held on 6 October 1971 and the new City of Winnipeg was amalgamated on 1 January 1972. Thereafter, the new Council consisted of 50 councillors—elected from each of Winnipeg's wards—and 1 mayor, who is elected by the city as a whole. From 1972 onward, the mayor held office for a term of three years. Finally, in 1998, the term of office was extended to four years.

== List of mayors ==
19th century
Mayor	Term	Lifespan
Francis Evans Cornish	1873–1874	1831–1878
William Nassau Kennedy	1874–1876	1839–1885
Thomas Scott	1876–1878	1841–1915
Alexander Logan	1878–1880	1841–1894
Elias George Conklin	1880–1881	1845–1901
Alexander Logan	1881–1882	1841–1894
Alexander McMicken	1882–1883	1837–1916
Alexander Logan	1883–1884	1841–1894
Charles Edward Hamilton	1884–1885	1844–1919
Henry Shaver Wesbrook	1885–1886	1842–1913
Lyman Melvin Jones	1886–1888	1843–1917
Thomas Ryan	1888–1889	1849–1937
Alfred Pearson	1889–1891	1850–1921
Alexander Macdonald	1891–1892	1843–1928
Thomas William Taylor	1892–1894	1852–1924
Thomas Gilroy	1894–1895	1848–1905
Richard Willis Jameson	1895–1896	1851–1899
William Forsythe McCreary	1896–1897	1855–1905
Alfred Joseph Andrews	1897–1899	1865–1950
John Fletcher Mitchell (acting)	1899–1900	1862–1953

20th century
Mayor	Term	Lifespan
Horace Wilson	1900	1848 – c. 1903
John Arbuthnot	1900–1903	1861–1931
Thomas Sharpe	1903–1906	1866–1929
James Henry Ashdown	1906–1908	1844–1924
William Sanford Evans	1908–1911	1869–1950
Richard Deans Waugh	1911–1912	1868–1938
Thomas Russ Deacon	1912–1914	1865–1955
Richard Deans Waugh	1914–1916	1868–1938
Frederick Harvey Davidson	1916–1918	1865–1935
Charles Frederick Gray	1918–1920	1879–1954
Edward Parnell	1920–1922	1859–1922
Frank Oliver Fowler	1922	1861–1945
Seymour James Farmer	1922–1924	1878–1951
Ralph Humphreys Webb	1924–1927	1886–1945
Daniel McLean	1927–1929	1868–1950
Ralph Humphreys Webb	1929–1934	1886–1945
John Queen	1934–1946	1882–1946
Frederick Edgar Warriner	1936–1937	1884–1966
John Queen	1937–1942	1882–1946
Garnet Coulter	1942–1954	1882–1975
George Edward Sharpe	1954–1956	1908–1985
Stephen Juba	1956–1977	1914–1993
Robert Ashley Steen	1977–1979	1933–1979
William "Bill" Norrie	1979–1992	1929-2012
Susan Ann Thompson	1992–1998	1946–present
Glen Ronald Murray	1998–2004	1957–present

21st century
Mayor	Term	Lifespan
Glen Ronald Murray	1998–2004	1957–present
Samuel M. "Sam" Katz	2004–2014	1951–present
Brian Bowman	2014–2022	1971–present
Scott Gillingham	2022–present	
