= Dominion Police =

Former Canadian police force

Dominion Police Force
- Helmet badge of the Dominion Police

Agency overview
- Formed: May 22, 1868
- Dissolved: February 1, 1920
- Superseding agency: Royal Canadian Mounted Police

Jurisdictional structure
- Operations jurisdiction: Canada
- Legal jurisdiction: Canada
- General nature: Civilian police

The Dominion Police Force was the federal police force of Canada between 1868 and 1920, and was one of the predecessors of the Royal Canadian Mounted Police. It was the first federal police force in Canada, formed the year following the Canadian Confederation to enforce federal laws and perform policing duties for the Federal Government of Canada. On 1 February 1920, the Dominion Police was merged with the Royal North-West Mounted Police to form the Royal Canadian Mounted Police as the new federal police force of Canada.

== History ==
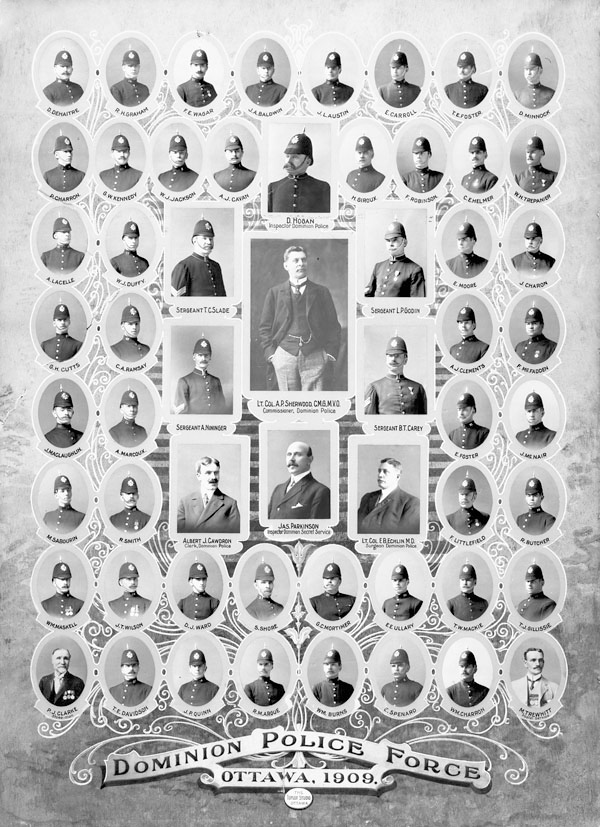
Collage of the members of the Police Force

The Dominion Police was formed as the first federal police force with jurisdiction over the entirety of Canada, built from the Western Frontier Constabulary which had been in existence since 1864. (Note: organized by Gilbert McMicken, on the initiative of John A. Macdonald, initially as a secret police to deal with issues arising from the United States Civil War, and later from the Fenian raids) It was mainly active in Eastern Canada, while the North-West Mounted Police, founded in 1873, handled the expansive and sparsely populated North-West Territories of Western Canada.

It was created on May 22, 1868, in response to the assassination of Thomas D'Arcy McGee, a prominent Irish-Canadian politician and MP for Montreal West, in Ottawa on 7 April. McGee was killed by elements of the Fenian Brotherhood, a powerful Irish nationalist organization based in the United States, in the new federal capital less than a year after Confederation. The Canadian authorities were worried about the power of the Fenian Brotherhood, which had already launched three major raids into Canada in 1866 before McGee's death, and that existing law enforcement agencies were not capable of protecting state security.

Its primary functions were:

- protection of buildings of the Federal Government of Canada, including the Parliament Buildings on Parliament Hill, (Note: now protected by House of Commons and Senate Security Service Constables and Scanner operators) the naval yards at Halifax and Esquimalt,
- providing bodyguards for government leaders,
- carrying out secret service work arising from the activities of the Fenian raids,
- enforcing certain federal laws such as those relating to counterfeiting and human trafficking, and
- keeping the peace for specified railways and canals that were under construction when the Public Works Peace Preservation Act, 1869 was brought into force.

They gradually also acquired responsibilities for compiling fingerprint and criminal records, and administering a parole service.

In Ontario, commissioners of the Dominion Police were vested with the same powers as police magistrates and justices of the peace in the province, and constables had the same status as those appointed under provincial law. The Dominion Police informally handled some provincial-level policing duties in rural Ontario until the creation of the Ontario Provincial Police in 1909.

In May 1918, the Dominion Police were reassigned to the Department of Militia and Defence and became a civilian wing of the Canadian Military Police Corps (CMPC). In the early 1900s, the Royal North-West Mounted Police had declined as the North-West Territories was divided into new provinces and territories, and due to the general unpopularity of the force for conduct during industrial disputes such as the Winnipeg General Strike. On 1 February 1920, the civilian members of the CMPC, including the Dominion Police, were merged with the Royal Canadian Mounted Police, (Note: as the RNWMP were renamed In July 1919, while the merger was only formally implemented in May 1920) and the CMPC was disbanded on 1 December 1920.

== Structure ==
The Dominion Police consisted of Commissioners and constables appointed for that purpose, and its authority extended over the provinces and all parts of the territories not patrolled by the RNWMP. The organization was decentralized, with many Commissioners being appointed with either provincial or national responsibility, and it had two national co-commissioners until 1876. The national Commissioner also acted as the Commissioner of the Montreal Water Police, which reported separately to the Minister of the Marine and Fisheries. (Note: The Montreal Water Police would later fall under the responsibility of the National Harbours Board.) Although formed under different statutory authority, (Note: An Act respecting Harbor Police, S.C. 1868, c. 62 , later reconstituted as separate Harbour and River Police forces for Montreal and Quebec under An Act respecting the Harbour and River Police of the Province of Quebec, S.C. 1882, c. 48) its constables were appointed as police officers under the 1868 Act.

The commissioners that had responsibility for all of Canada were:

- Gilbert McMicken (1869-1871)
- Hewitt Bernard (1871-1876)
- Charles-Joseph Coursol (1869-1876)
- Zebulon Aiton Lash (1876-1880)
- Augustus Keefer (1880-1885)
- Sir Percy Sherwood (1885-1919)
- Colonel Gilbert Godson-Godson (1919-1920)

From 1913, while Sherwood was the commissioner responsible for all of Canada, the title for this senior commissioner role was adjusted to Chief Commissioner, to whom all regional or departmental commissioners reported.

=== Ranks ===
The ranks of the Dominion Police were as follows:

- Chief Commissioner ("chief" designation added 1913)
- Commissioner
- Inspector
- Sub-inspector
- Sergeant
- Constable
