= Alexander Macdonald (Manitoba politician) =

His Worship Alexander Macdonald
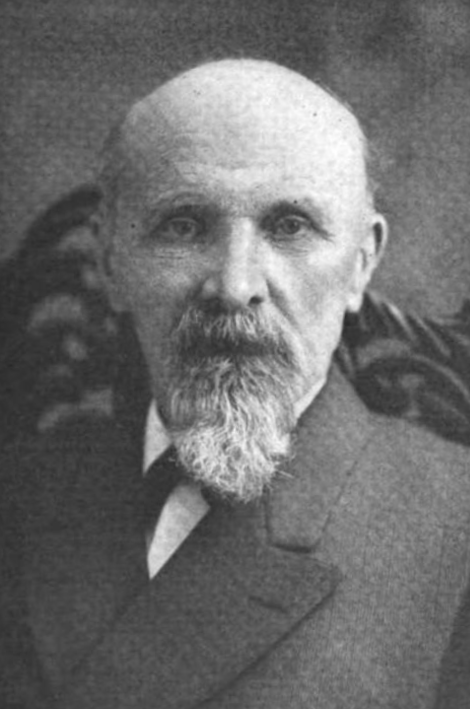

12th Mayor of Winnipeg
- In office 1892–1892

Personal details
- Born: 1 November 1844 Pitlochry, Scotland
- Died: 28 August 1928 (aged 83) Winnipeg, Manitoba
- Spouse: Annie Sullivan
- Profession: Grocer

Alexander Macdonald (1 November 1844 – 28 August 1928) was a Canadian politician, the 12th Mayor of Winnipeg in 1892.

Macdonald was born in Pitlochry, Scotland and moved to Canada in 1868, eventually settling in Winnipeg in 1871. He contributed to the establishment of the Manitoba Free Press newspaper in 1872, among his numerous commercial activities. He headed the Winnipeg-based A. Macdonald & Co. whose market extended throughout western Canada, between Fort William and Vancouver. He also became president of the Great-West Life Insurance Company in 1894.

He served as Winnipeg's mayor for one year, 1892. In 1910, the Winnipeg Telegram reported that he was one of that city's 19 millionaires.
