= Henry Shaver Westbrook =

His Worship Henry Shaver Westbrook

8th Mayor of Winnipeg
- In office 1886–1886

Personal details
- Born: June 1842 Oakland, Brant County, Canada West
- Died: October 1913 (aged 71) Selkirk, Manitoba, Canada

Henry Shaver Westbrook (June 1842 – October 1913) was the eighth Mayor of Winnipeg in 1886.

After moving to Winnipeg in the mid-1870s, he established a vehicle and equipment business with Frank Fairchild. He defeated E. R. Crowe to become Mayor of Winnipeg in December 1885.

In 1959, Winnipeg renamed Victoria Street to Westbrook Street in his honour.
