= Frederick Davidson =

Frederick Harvey Davidson (August 21, 1865 – August 27, 1935) was the 26th Mayor of Winnipeg from 1917 to 1918.

He was born in Brockville, Canada West, and moved to Manitoba when he was 18 years old. The next year, he and his brothers established the Davidson Brothers contracting firm.

Davidson served on Winnipeg city council from 1912 to 1916 before becoming Mayor in 1917 (after the election of David J. Dyson was overturned after a recount) and served until 1918. He then served again on city council from 1920 to 1929 and again from 1932 to 1933.

Davidson served as president of the Winnipeg Builders' Exchange in 1911 and belonged to a number of service clubs.

Preceded by David J. Dyson	Mayor of Winnipeg, MB; 1917-1918	Succeeded by Charles Gray
