= Thomas Ryan (Canadian politician) =

His Worship Thomas Ryan

10th Mayor of Winnipeg
- In office 1889–1889

Personal details
- Born: 24 August 1849 Perth, Canada West
- Died: 24 November 1937 (aged 88) Winnipeg, Manitoba, Canada
- Spouse: Annie Anderson (m. 1880)

Thomas Ryan (24 August 1849 – 24 November 1937) was a footwear manufacturer, municipal politician, and the tenth Mayor of Winnipeg in 1889.

As a youth, Ryan fought the attempted Fenian invasion of Canada in 1866. He then established a trade in making boots and shoes, moving to Winnipeg in 1874 to establish business at what would become the Ryan Block on 492 Main Street. He was dubbed "The Shoe King" due to his success in that business which served customers between present-day British Columbia and Lake Superior in Ontario.

Ryan became a city alderman in 1884 and served in that role until he was elected Mayor for a single one-year term in 1889. He was dedicated to the Methodist Church, helping to establish Grace Methodist Church in Winnipeg and serving as president of the local YMCA. He developed and imposed restrictions on Sunday commerce during his mayoral term.

Norwegian Annie Anderson was Ryan's wife with whom he had nine children. Winnipeg's Ryan Street is named in his honour.
