= 16th Manitoba Legislature =

The members of the 16th Manitoba Legislature were elected in the Manitoba general election held in June 1920. The legislature sat from February 10, 1921, to June 24, 1922.

The Liberal Party led by Tobias Norris formed a minority government.

John Thomas Haig of the Conservatives was Leader of the Opposition.

James Bryson Baird served as speaker for the assembly.

There were two sessions of the 16th Legislature:

| Session | Start | End |
|---|---|---|
| 1st | February 10, 1921 | May 7, 1921 |
| 2nd | January 12, 1922 | April 6, 1922 |

James Albert Manning Aikins was Lieutenant Governor of Manitoba.

== Members of the Assembly ==
The following members were elected to the assembly in 1920:

| Member | Electoral district | Party | First elected / previously elected | No.# of term(s) |
|---|---|---|---|---|
| John Williams | Arthur | Liberal | 1907, 1914 | 4th term* |
| William Bayley | Assiniboia | Labour | 1920 | 1st term |
| George Little | Beautiful Plains | Farmer | 1920 | 1st term |
| George Malcolm | Birtle | Liberal | 1909 | 5th term |
| Albert Edward Smith | Brandon City | Labour | 1920 | 1st term |
| Maurice Duprey | Carillon | Farmer | 1920 | 1st term |
| William H. Spinks | Cypress | Conservative | 1920 | 1st term |
| George Hastings Palmer | Dauphin | Labour | 1920 | 1st term |
| Robert Stirton Thornton | Deloraine | Liberal | 1907, 1914 | 4th term* |
| Edward August | Dufferin | Liberal | 1915 | 2nd term |
| Dmytro Yakimischak | Emerson | Farmer | 1920 | 1st term |
| Nicholas Hryhorczuk | Ethelbert | Independent Farmer | 1920 | 1st term |
| Albert Kirvan | Fairford | Liberal | 1920 | 1st term |
| Henry Mabb | Fisher | Independent Farmer | 1920 | 1st term |
| William Findlater | Gilbert Plains | Liberal | 1915 | 2nd term |
| Gudmundur Fjelsted | Gimli | Farmer | 1920 | 1st term |
| James William Armstrong | Gladstone | Liberal | 1907 | 5th term |
| William Robson | Glenwood | Independent Farmer | 1920 | 1st term |
| John Henry McConnell | Hamiota | Liberal | 1914 | 3rd term |
| Arthur Boivin | Iberville | Independent | 1917 (Note: First elected as a Conservative) | 2nd term |
| Charles Albert Tanner | Kildonan and St. Andrews | Labour | 1920 | 1st term |
| Samuel Fletcher | Killarney | Farmer | 1920 | 1st term |
| Charles Duncan McPherson | Lakeside | Liberal | 1910, 1915 | 3rd term* |
| Tobias Norris | Lansdowne | Liberal | 1896, 1907 | 7th term* |
| Philippe Talbot | La Verendrye | Independent | 1915 (Note: First elected as a Liberal) | 2nd term |
| John S. Ridley | Manitou | Conservative | 1920 | 1st term |
| George Grierson | Minnedosa | Liberal | 1914 | 3rd term |
| John Kennedy | Morden and Rhineland | Conservative | 1920 | 1st term |
| William Clubb | Morris | Farmer | 1920 | 1st term |
| James Bryson Baird | Mountain | Liberal | 1907 | 5th term |
| Reuben Waugh | Norfolk | Conservative | 1920 | 1st term |
| Fawcett Taylor | Portage la Prairie | Conservative | 1920 | 1st term |
| Henry Robson Richardson | Roblin | Farmer | 1920 | 1st term |
| William McKinnell | Rockwood | Farmer | 1920 | 1st term |
| John Morrison | Rupertsland | Liberal | 1916 | 2nd term |
| William Wilber Wilfred Wilson | Russell | Liberal | 1915 | 2nd term |
| Joseph Bernier | St. Boniface | Independent Conservative | 1900, 1907, 1920 | 5th term* |
| Matthew Stanbridge | St. Clements | Labour | 1920 | 1st term |
| Albert Kristjansson | St. George | Labour | 1920 | 1st term |
| Albert Kristjansson | St. George | Farmer | 1920 | 1st term |
| Joseph Hamelin | Ste. Rose | Conservative | 1914 | 3rd term |
| Arthur Moore | Springfield | Labour | 1920 | 1st term |
| Robert Emmond | Swan River | People's Independent Party- Farmer | 1920 | 1st term |
| Edward Brown | The Pas | Liberal | 1915 | 2nd term |
| George William McDonald | Turtle Mountain | Liberal | 1915 | 2nd term |
| George Clingan | Virden | Liberal | 1914 | 3rd term |
| Fred Dixon | Winnipeg | Labour | 1914 | 3rd term |
| Thomas Herman Johnson | Winnipeg | Liberal | 1907 | 5th term |
| William Ivens | Winnipeg | Labour | 1920 | 1st term |
| John Thomas Haig | Winnipeg | Conservative | 1914, (Note: Assiniboia) 1920 | 2nd term* |
| John Queen | Winnipeg | Social Democrat | 1920 | 1st term |
| John Stovel | Winnipeg | Liberal | 1920 | 1st term |
| Duncan Cameron | Winnipeg | Liberal | 1920 | 1st term |
| George Armstrong | Winnipeg | Socialist | 1920 | 1st term |
| Edith Rogers | Winnipeg | Liberal | 1920 | 1st term |
| William J. Tupper | Winnipeg | Conservative | 1920 | 1st term |

== By-elections ==
By-elections were held to replace members for various reasons:

| Electoral district | Member elected | Affiliation | Election date | Reason |
|---|---|---|---|---|
| Birtle | George Malcolm | Liberal | October 14, 1920 | G Malcolm appointed Minister of Agriculture |
| Lakeside | Charles Duncan McPherson | Liberal | January 31, 1921 | CD McPherson appointed Minister of Public Works |
