= George Prout =

Canadian politician

George Waldron Prout (June 5, 1878 – ca. 1980) was a politician in Manitoba, Canada. He served in the Legislative Assembly of Manitoba from 1915 to 1920, as a member of the Liberal Party.

Prout was born to a British family in Barbados, and was educated privately. He came to Canada in 1896, and worked as a financial agent in Selkirk, Manitoba. He married Emma Evans McKinley in 1914. In religion, Prout was a member of the Church of England.

He first sought election to the Manitoba legislature in the provincial election of 1914, and lost to Conservative cabinet minister Walter Montague by only one vote in the constituency of Kildonan and St. Andrews. Montague was not a candidate in the 1915 provincial election, and Prout defeated his new Conservative opponent by 541 votes to win a seat in the legislature. The Liberals won a landslide majority government in this election, and Prout served as a backbench supporter of Tobias Norris's administration for the next five years.

In 1917, he introduced the Rural Credits Act which provided for the establishment of rural credit societies that could obtain short term loans on behalf of members to purchase seed, livestock, implements, machinery and other supplies.

Prout sought re-election in the Winnipeg constituency in the 1920 provincial election. Prior to this election, a change in Manitoba's electoral system redesigned Winnipeg as a ten-member constituency, with members chosen by a single transferable ballot. Prout was not selected as a Liberal candidate, and ran for re-election as an independent. He fared poorly, finishing in 31st place on the first count with only 219 votes, and was eliminated on the eleventh count.

Prout attempted to return to the legislature in the 1927 provincial election, running as a Liberal candidate in the Fisher constituency. He finished a distant third against Nicholas Bachynsky of the Progressive Party.

He died in Toronto.
