= 1920 Manitoba general election =

Canadian election

- June 29, 1920

55 seats of the Legislative Assembly of Manitoba 28 seats needed for a majority
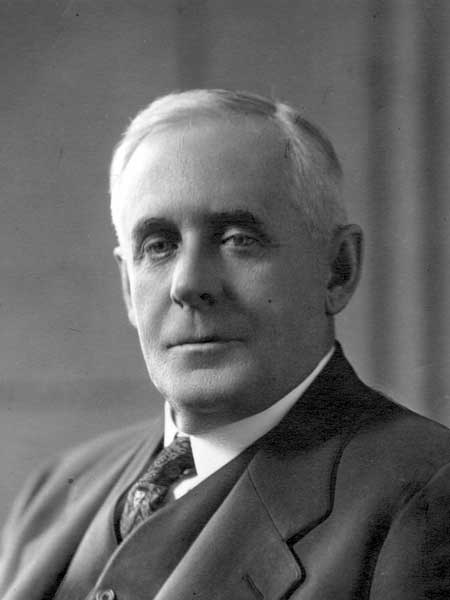
	First party	Second party
Leader	Tobias Norris
Party	Liberal	Farmer
Leader since	1910
Leader's seat	Lansdowne
Last election	40	pre-creation
Seats won	21	14
Seat change	▼19	▲14
Percentage	35.1%	14.1%
Swing	▼20.0pp	▲14.1pp
	Third party	Fourth party
Leader	Fred Dixon	Richard G. Willis
Party	Labour	Conservative
Leader since	1920	1919
Leader's seat	Winnipeg	Ran in Turtle Mountain (lost)
Last election	pre-creation	5
Seats won	11	8
Seat change	▲11	▲3
Percentage	20.5%	18.5%
Swing	▲20.5pp	▼14.5pp
Premier before election
Tobias Norris
Liberal
Premier after election
Tobias Norris
Liberal

The 1920 Manitoba general election was held on June 29, 1920 to elect members of the Legislative Assembly of the Province of Manitoba, Canada. This was the first election since the Winnipeg General Strike, which had violently divided the people of Winnipeg, Manitoba's capital and largest city, into two camps. Partly to soften this polarization, a form of proportional representation was adopted in Winnipeg, and the 1920 Manitoba election was the first North American government election above the city level to use proportional representation. This was the first election where single transferable voting was used to elect Winnipeg MLAs, now ten in number.

It was also the first Manitoba provincial election to allow women, excepting Treaty Indians, to vote and to run as candidates. Edith Rogers, a Metis, was elected in Winnipeg, becoming the first woman elected to the Manitoba Legislature.

The election produced a minority government, with no group holding a majority of seats in the legislature. Norris's Liberals had more seats than any other party, 21 seats out of 55, so were given power. The government survived only two years.

== Background ==
Between the previous 1915 election and the 1920 campaign, Manitoba experienced profound social and cultural change. Since the formal introduction of partisan politics in 1888, Manitoba had been dominated by the Liberal and Conservative parties, which governed the province in succession. After World War I, new political groups and interests emerged to threaten the two-party system.

The Winnipeg General Strike of 1919 brought labour issues to the forefront of provincial concern and radicalized many working-class Manitobans. In previous elections, labour and socialist parties were a marginal force. Going into the 1920 election, they stood to make significant electoral gains. In the rural constituencies, several candidates ran for office as farmer representatives, or as "people's candidates" opposed to partisan government.

Against this backdrop, the governing Liberal Party of Tobias Norris ran a defensive campaign. Supported by the Winnipeg Free Press, the Liberals portrayed themselves as a stabilizing force amid the province's changes.

The 1920 election is notable for its use of single transferable voting (STV) in the City of Winnipeg. Previously, the city had been divided into three two-member constituencies, each seat elected in a separate "first past the post" election.

Starting in the 1920 election, Winnipeg was covered by a city-wide ten-member constituency, in which each voter had one vote. The method of election was the STV system of proportional representation. In the world, this was the largest number of legislators elected by STV in any district up to that time. Winnipeg would use STV to elect its MLAs until 1958.

Winnipeg's change to STV was done in an attempt to calm the political waters, which might have been roiled up even more if majority government was granted to a party that did not have majority support.

== Outcome ==
The election resulted in a fragmented parliament, with no group holding majority of seats in the legislature. Norris's Liberals remained the largest party, but were reduced to a minority government with 21 seats out of 55. The party remained in office until 1922, but unwilling or unable to find joint cause with the other factions, it did little in the way of legislative initiatives.

Twelve "farmer" and "independent farmer" members were elected in rural constituencies. These candidates were a heterogeneous group and did not run a united campaign. While not a "political party" in the traditional sense, they formed a functional caucus group in the legislature. Some members of this group later joined the political wing of the United Farmers of Manitoba, which took power in the next election.

In Winnipeg's ten seats, Liberal candidates took four seats and Conservatives two. Labour made a good showing there as well. Four different working-class and left-wing parties ran candidates in Winnipeg and altogether ran ten candidates, electing four.

The Labour Party won an impressive victory in Winnipeg, taking two seats. Party leader Fred Dixon received 1100 votes in the First Count, a lead of more than 7,000 votes ahead of his nearest rival. His vote tally was more than twice the number needed to take a seat (the quota). His surplus were not wasted but under the rules of STV, it was transferred to other candidates. Many went to other DLP candidates, and Ivens then exceeded quota and was declared elected.

Leftists were rewarded with four seats of the 10 Winnipeg seats. Elected were Dixon and William Ivens of the Dominion Labour Party, George Armstrong of the Socialist Party of Canada, and John Queen of the Social Democratic Party. SPC's Robert B. Russell narrowly failed to win a second seat for his party. A candidate of the Ex-Soldiers and Ex-Sailors Party of Manitoba also campaigned with the Labour candidates in Winnipeg. When he was eliminated, his votes went mostly to the remaining candidates of the DLP, SPC and SDP.

Ivens, Armstrong, Queen and Russell were all serving prison sentences at the time of the election, due to their leadership of the Winnipeg General Strike. Many Winnipegers believed the prison sentences were politically motivated, and the issue was a rallying cry for labour in the campaign.

Seven other labour MLAs were elected in the rest of the province, making the Labour group the third largest in the legislature.

The Conservative Party managed a minor recovery from its disastrous showing in 1915 and won eight seats under its new leader, Richard G. Willis. Willis himself was not elected.

Three independents were also elected to the legislature in rural districts.

The first woman was elected to the Legislature in this election. Edith Rogers was also the first Indigenous woman in the Manitoba Legislature.

== Party results ==
Party	Party leader	# of candidates	Members elected			Popular vote		
Party	Party leader	# of candidates	1915	1920	% change	#	%	% change
Liberal	Tobias Norris		40	21	-47.5%		35.1%	-20%
Farmer	-			12			14.1%	
Labour (DLP)	Fred Dixon	12		9			17.7%	
Socialist Party	Fred Dixon	4		1			2.8%	
Social Democratic (1)	Fred Dixon	1	1	1	-			
Conservative	Richard G. Willis		5	8	+60.0%		18.5%	-14.5%
Independents/others (1)			1	3	+200%		2.6%	
Total			47	55	+17.0%		100%	

Note:

(1) SDP popular vote included in "Independents/others".

Popular vote
Liberal	35.10%
DLP/Soc/SD	20.50%
Conservative	18.50%
Farmer	14.10%
Others	11.80%

Seats summary
Liberal	38.18%
Farmer	21.82%
DLP/Soc/SD	20.00%
Conservative	14.55%
Others	5.45%

== Riding results ==
Arthur:

- (incumbent) John Williams (L) 891
- Duncan Lloyd McLeod (C-Farmer) 881

Assiniboia:

- William Bayley (DLP/Labour) 2054
- (incumbent) John W. Wilton (Ind) 1941

Beautiful Plains:

- George Little (Farmer) accl.

Birtle:

- (incumbent) George Malcolm (L) 995
- Sam Larcombe (Farmer) 861

Brandon City:

- Albert Edward Smith (Brandon Labour Party/Labour) 2007
- (incumbent) Stephen Emmett Clement (L) 1403
- Brig-Gen. James Kircaldy (C) 1245

Carillon:

- Maurice Duprey (Farmer) 973
- (incumbent) Albert Prefontaine (C) 925

Cypress:

- William Spinks (C) 1487
- (incumbent) Andrew W. Myles (L) 1307

Dauphin:

- George Palmer (Labour) 1466
- (incumbent) William J. Harrington (L) 1044

Deloraine:

- (incumbent) Robert Stirton Thornton (L) 1503
- J.C.W. Reid (C) 1188

Dufferin:

- (incumbent) Edward August (L) 1478
- Alexander Morrison (C) 1401

Emerson:

- Dmytro Yakimischak (Farmer) 989
- Roy Whitman (C) 925
- (incumbent) John D. Baskerville (L) 756

Ethelbert:

- Nicholas Hryhorczuk (Independent Farmer) 1271
- Ernest A. Marcroft (Farmer) 684
- James Guiszdaski (L) 110

Fairford:

- Albert Kirvan (L) 241
- Gabriel Gilbert Serkan (L) 240
- Oliver Calverley (Ind) 236
- A.F. Carpenter (Ind) 137
- J. Matheson (Ind) 121

Fisher:

- Henry Mabb (Independent Farmer) 443
- J.W. Arsenyth (L) 362
- A.J. Gamache (L) 214

Gilbert Plains:

- (incumbent) William Findlater (L) 735
- R.J. Dalglish (Ind) 715

Gimli:

- Gudmundur Fjelsted (Farmer) 1359
- (incumbent) Taras Ferley (L) 1242

Gladstone:

- (incumbent) James Armstrong (L) 1327
- Wesley Lobb (Farmer) 1147

Glenwood:

- William Robson (Independent Farmer) 1149
- (incumbent) James Breakey (L) 1145

Hamiota:

- (incumbent) John Henry McConnell (L) 1109
- William Ferguson (C) 762

Iberville:

- (incumbent) Arthur Boivin (Ind) accl.

Kildonan & St. Andrews:

- Charles Tanner (DLP/Labour) 1184
- David Morrison (L) 876
- T. McConnell (Farmer) 852

Killarney:

- Samuel Fletcher (Farmer) 1072
- (incumbent) Samuel M. Hayden (L) 676

Lakeside:

- (incumbent) Charles Duncan McPherson (L) 1104
- Edwin Herbert Muir (C) 1081

Lansdowne:

- (incumbent) Tobias Norris (L) 1752
- Harvey Hicks (C) 914

La Verendrye:

- (incumbent) Philippe Talbot (Ind) 1023
- L.R. Magnum (Farmer) 709

Manitou:

- John S. Ridley (C) 1185
- George Compton (Farmer) 926
- (incumbent) George Armstrong (L) 901

Minnedosa:

- (incumbent) George Grierson (L) 1296
- W.T. Bielby (Farmer) 1029

Morden and Rhineland:

- John Kennedy (C) 814
- Howard Winkler (L) 752

Morris:

- William Clubb (Farmer) 930
- Alex Ayotte (Farmer) 765
- Frederick J. Last (Ind) 251

Mountain:

- (incumbent) James Baird (L) 1304
- Andrew Young (Farmer) 1178

Norfolk:

- Reuben Waugh (C) 1090
- (incumbent) John Graham (L) 873
- John H. Wright (Farmer) 503

Portage la Prairie:

- Fawcett Taylor (C) 1306
- (incumbent) Ewan McPherson (L) 1019

Roblin:

- Henry Richardson (Farmer) 991
- Frederic Newton (C) 887

Rockwood:

- William McKinnell (Farmer) 978
- (incumbent) Arthur Lobb (L) 977
- Thomas Scott (C) 638

Rupertsland:

- (incumbent) John Morrison (L) accl.

Russell:

- (incumbent) William W.W. Wilson (L) 1274
- R.J. Brown (Farmer) 642
- Albert Lannigan (Ind) 593

St. Boniface:

- Joseph Bernier (Ind-C) 1434
- John Power Howden (L) 942
- (incumbent) Joseph Dumas (L) 730
- Christopher R. Rice (Ind) 675
- Tony Hoornaert (Ind) 404

St. Clements:

- Matthew Stanbridge (Labour) 977
- (incumbent) Donald A. Ross (L-Ind) 850
- H. McLennan (Farmer) 445

St. George:

- Albert Kristjansson (Labour) 901
- (incumbent) Skuli Sigfusson (L) 784

Ste. Rose:

- (incumbent) Joseph Hamelin (C) 878
- D.J. Hill (Ind) 745
- Z.H. Rheaume (L) 488

Springfield:

- Arthur Moore (Labour) 987
- Isaac Cook (Farmer) 928
- E.D.R. Bissett (L) 352
- E.H. Dugard (Farmer) 123

Swan River:

- Robert Emmond (People's Independent Party/Farmer) 1163
- (incumbent) William H. Sims (L) 544

The Pas:

- (incumbent) Edward Brown (L) 560
- Allan Norgrove (Labour) 126

Turtle Mountain:

- (incumbent) George William McDonald (L) 1022
- Richard G. Willis (C) 1006

Virden:

- (incumbent) George Clingan (L) 1313
- Reginald Arthur Knight (Farmer) 1022

== Winnipeg election results ==
The electoral districts of Winnipeg were combined to form one city-wide multi-member constituency, with its ten MLAs elected via single transferable vote. While the parties that contested the election all filed slates of candidates, or coordinated with allies to field joint slates, the election itself was not conducted by party list. Each voter only cast one vote for a single candidate, but had the option to mark back-up choices by ranking the other candidates. Votes were transferred in cases where it was found that the marked preference had more than enough votes to be elected or was not popular enough to be elected. Nine of the candidates in the top ten spots in the first round of counting were elected in the end. The vote transfers mostly merely confirmed that initial ordering of candidates but in one case they had an effect - they caused the election of SDP candidate John Queen, instead of the initially-more popular Socialist candidate Russell. However, each voter having just one vote meant that no one party could take much more than its due share of seats in the first round, and a wide range of parties were represented among those in winning positions even in the first round of counting.

The two main parties each ran a full slate of candidates, an inefficient practice they avoided in later elections. A joint "Labour" ten-name slate was filed by the Dominion Labour Party, the Socialist Party, the Social Democratic Party and the Ex-Soldiers and Ex-Sailors Party of Manitoba. Those thirty party candidates were joined on the ballot by 11 independent candidates. At least five candidates were women (1 Conservative, 1 Liberal, 1 SPC and 2 Independent).

The Droop Quota was calculated based on valid votes cast. Any candidate with votes enough to equal or exceed the quota were declared elected, and their surplus votes distributed based on voters' next marked usable preference in a subsequent count. At the start of each count, if there were still seats remaining to be filled but no candidates had been elected to produce surplus votes needing transfer, the candidate with the least votes at that count was eliminated and their votes distributed based on voters' next usable marked preference. The process repeated until all ten seats were filled. The last seats were filled on the 38th round of counting, when the fourth remaining candidate was eliminated, leaving just three left in the running with three seats still to be filled. These last three were declared elected even though they did not have quota.

In total, 47,321 valid votes were cast. Accordingly, the Droop quota was 4,312.

Two candidates, Labour Fred Dixon, and Liberal minister Thomas Johnson secured the quota (with Dixon getting almost three times the quota) and were declared elected. Dixon's large number of surplus votes were transferred, impacting several candidates' rankings in the second count. Close to half of the surplus votes went to party running-mate William Ivens, which enabled him to leapfrog from fifth place to secure the third seat in the second round of counting. Each subsequent count produced only small changes in ranking, in part due to the vote transfers of eliminated candidates going from less popular candidates to more popular ones. It was not until the thirty-first count the fourth member was declared elected, Conservative John Thomas Haig, followed by Social Democrat John Queen on the thirty-second count. (He had moved up from the 13th spot through vote transfers.) Liberals John Stovel and Duncan Cameron were elected on the thirty third count. The final three members, Socialist George Armstrong, Liberal Edith Rogers, and Conservative William J. Tupper (son of the one time Prime Minister) did not obtain enough votes to match the Droop quota but were declared elected after a 4th remaining candidate was eliminated in the thirty-eighth round of counting, leaving just three candidates in the running for the last three seats.

Party		Candidates	Elected	Elected members	Party tally of first preferences	
Party		Candidates	Elected	Elected members	Votes	%
Liberal		10 (Note: including five incumbents, four of which were defeated)	4	Thomas Johnson, John Stovel, Duncan Cameron, Edith Rogers	14423	30.64%
Dominion Labour	Joint slate	4	2	Fred Dixon, William Ivens	13665	29.03%
Social Democratic	Joint slate	1	1	John Queen	1253	2.66%
Socialist	Joint slate	4	1	George Armstrong	4797	10.19%
Ex-Soldier	Joint slate	1	0		452	0.96%
Conservative		10	2	John Thomas Haig, William J. Tupper	6475	13.76%
Independents		11	0		6362	13.52%

Nine of the ten elected MLAs were among the top ten vote-getters in the first count. The only exception was John Queen of the Social Democratic Party, who was in thirteenth in the first count, but moved up to sixth place in the second count. Only one of the five women running, Liberal Edith Rogers, was elected, and only at the end, with a partial quota.

=== Effectiveness in reflecting voters wishes ===
Under the STV system used to elect Winnipeg's ten MLAs, 42,040 (89 percent of the 47,427 valid votes cast) were actually used to help elect someone.

A total of 30,999 first preferences (65 percent of the 47,427 valid votes) were expressed for those who were declared elected sooner or later.

Every party, except the Ex-Soldiers Party (Samuel Cartwright) elected at least one representative, so of the party voters, all but 452 voters (in the first count) saw someone of their preferred party elected.

In each case, the most-personally-popular candidate on the party slate was elected.

=== Winnipeg results summary by candidates ===
Candidate Incumbent re-elected defeated Newly elected		Affiliation		1st count		Final (Note: Under final, Count was the count following which the candidate was either declared elected or eliminated, Votes was the candidate's vote tally at that count before surplus (if elected) or remainder (if eliminated) were redistributed. As some of the final votes were later transferred, the "final" counts together add up to more than votes cast. # indicates the order in which the candidates were declared elected.)		
Candidate Incumbent re-elected defeated Newly elected		Party	Slate	Votes	# (Note: In column under # was the candidate's ranking at a particular count.)	Count	Votes	#
	Frederick John “Fred” Dixon	Dominion Labour	Labour	11586	1	1st	11,586	1
	Thomas Herman Johnson	Liberal		4386	2	1st	4,386	2
New	William “Bill” Ivens	Dominion Labour	Labour	1928	5	2nd	5,544	3
New	John Thomas Haig	Conservative		1893	6	31st	4,416	4
New	John Queen	Social Democratic	Labour	1253	13	32nd	4,332	5
New	John Stovel	Liberal		1743	7	33rd	4,674	6
New	Duncan Cameron	Liberal		2402	4	33rd	4,394	7
New	George Armstrong	Socialist	Labour	2767	3	38th	4,282	8
New	Edith Frances MacTavish Rogers	Liberal		1541	8	38th	4,010	9
New	William Johnston Tupper	Conservative		1500	10	38th	3,583	10
	Robert Boyd “R. B.” Russell	Socialist	Labour	1535	9	37th	3,520	11
	Harriet Snetsinger Dick	Independent		1307	11	33th	2,931	12
	Robert Jacob	Liberal		1206	14	31st	2,347	13
	William Clarence Morden	Independent		1150	16	30th	1,384	14
	Nelson D. Armstrong	Independent		1174	15	29th	1,864	15
	William John Christie	Conservative		1274	12	28th	1,726	16
	William Linton Parrish	Liberal		945	17	27th	1,424	17
	Samuel Cartwright	Soldiers & Sailors	Labour	452	23	26th	1,384	18
	Leoni St. Clairze “Leo” Warde	Independent		845	18	25th	1,201	19
	Mrs. William Arthur (Eleanor) Pritchard	Socialist	Labour	443	24	24th	1,155	20
	William Gibbon	Liberal		792	19	23rd	1,067	21
	Neil T. Carey	Independent		776	21	22nd	1,019	22
	Thomas Glendenning Hamilton	Liberal		786	20	21st	934	23
	James Lightfoot	Conservative		554	22	20th	862	24
	Edward Bailey Fisher	Independent		431	25	19th	508	25
	Walter A. James	Dominion Labour	Labour	56	38	18th	475	26
	Genevieve Elsie Alice Lipsett (Skinner)	Conservative		359	27	17th	461	27
	Frederick William Law	Liberal		368	26	16th	450	28
	Albert MacMartin	Conservative		189	33	15th	342	29
	Frederick George “Fred” Tipping	Dominion Labour	Labour	95	36	14th	313	30
	Charles Henry Forrester	Ind Prog-C		282	28	13th	309	31
	Robert Newton Lowery	Liberal		254	30	12th	284	32
	Percy V. Torrance	Conservative		265	29	11th	282	33
	George Waldron Prout	Independent		219	31	10th	261	34
	Malcolm McInnes	Conservative		218	32	9th	230	35
	Richard James “Dickie” Johns	Socialist	Labour	52	39	8th	173	36
	George H. Lawrence	Conservative		135	34	7th	159	37
	Alice Ann Dean Holling	Independent		105	35	6th	131	38
	James O. Turnbull	Conservative		88	37	5th	90	39
	David S. Lyons	Ind. Liberal		45	40	4th	50	40
	J. H. Gislason	Independent Liberal		28	41	4th	40	41

=== Detailed results by count ===
Vote tallies in the table below were extracted from reporting in the Winnipeg Free Press.

Rankings, gains and the exhausted tallies were calculated based on those reports. There were some apparent errors that were not reconcilable. These were simply bridged by understating the calculated exhausted tallies. The purpose of the table is to provide an easy visual to the movement of votes and candidates in the successive rounds.

Shading under change (±) columns informally highlight significant gains with colour indicating the affiliation of the source of transfer (no fixed threshold for highlight, varies at different counts, generally applied if a candidate received more than ~10% of the votes being transferred during that count, or if the transfer boost the candidate's tally by more than ~2%

Labour (DLP) candidates (Labour slate); Socialist candidates (SP, SDP) (Labour slate); Ex-soldier candidate (Labour slate)	Liberal candidates Conservative candidates Independent candidates

Arrows highlight selected changes in rankings that were significant, of interest, or consequential. (Not all changes were highlighted with arrows)
Both shading and arrows are for informal reference only.

=== 1st to 20th counts ===
remaining at start of round	10 / 41		8 / 39			7 / 38			7 / 38			7 / 38			7 / 36			7 / 35			7 / 34			7 / 33			7 / 32				7 / 31			7 / 30			7 / 29			7 / 28			7 / 27			7 / 26			7 / 25			7 / 24			7 / 23			7 / 22		
Elected or eliminated	Dixon;Johnson elected		Dixon surplus. Ivens elected			Johnson surplus			Ivens surplus.			Lyon; Gislason elim.			Turnbull elim.			Holling elim.			Lawrence elim.			Johns elim.			McInnes elim.				Prout elim.			Torrance elim.			Lowery elim.			Forrester elim.			Tipping elim.			MacMartin elim.			Law elim.			Lipsett elim.			James elim.			Fisher elim.		
Count	1st		2nd			3rd			4th			5th			6th			7th			8th			9th			10th				11th			12th			13th			14th			15th			16th			17th			18th			19th			20th		
Candidate	Votes	#	±	Votes	#	±	Votes	#	±	Votes	#	±	Votes	#	±	Votes	#	±	Votes	#	±	Votes	#	±	Votes	#	±	Votes	#	Candidate	±	Votes	#	±	Votes	#	±	Votes	#	±	Votes	#	±	Votes	#	±	Votes	#	±	Votes	#	±	Votes	#	±	Votes	#	±	Votes	#
Fred Dixon	11586	1	-7274	4312	1	E	4312	1	E	4312	1	E	4312	1	E	4312	1	E	4312	1	E	4312	1	E	4312	1	E	4312	1	Fred Dixon	E	4312	1	E	4312	1	E	4312	1	E	4312	1	E	4312	1	E	4312	1	E	4312	1	E	4312	1	E	4312	1	E	4312	1
Thomas Johnson	4386	2	0	4386	2	-74	4312	2	E	4312	2	E	4312	2	E	4312	2	E	4312	2	E	4312	2	E	4312	2	E	4312	2	Thomas Johnson	E	4312	2	E	4312	2	E	4312	2	E	4312	2	E	4312	2	E	4312	2	E	4312	2	E	4312	2	E	4312	2	E	4312	2
Bill Ivens	1928	5	3616	5544	3	0	5544	3	-1232	4312	3	E	4312	3	E	4312	3	E	4312	3	E	4312	3	E	4312	3	E	4312	3	Bill Ivens	0	4312	3	E	4312	3	E	4312	3	E	4312	3	E	4312	3	E	4312	3	E	4312	3	E	4312	3	E	4312	3	E	4312	3
J.T. Haig	1893	6	76	1969	8	1	1970	8	2	1972	8	3	1975	8	15	1990	8	9	1999	8	8	2007	8	0	2007	8	41	2048	8	J.T. Haig	15	2063	8	24	2087	8	3	2090	8	17	2107	8	2	2109	8	49	2158	8	14	2172	8	48	2220	8	13	2233	8	64	2297	8
John Queen	1253	13	851	2104	6	0	2104	6	374	2478	5	8	2486	5	0	2486	5	2	2488	5	3	2491	5	17	2508	5	0	2508	5	John Queen	9	2517	5	0	2517	5	2	2519	5	6	2525	5	49	2574	5	18	2592	5	8	2600	5	3	2603	5	117	2720	5	9	2729	5
John Stovel	1743	7	30	1773	9	10	1783	9	2	1785	9	0	1785	9	0	1785	*9	7	1792	9	4	1796	9	1	1797	9	7	1804	9	John Stovel	28	1832	9	7	1839	9	35	1874	9	2	1876	9	3	1879	9	3	1882	9	47	1929	9	21	1950	9	3	1953	9	34	1987	9
Duncan Cameron	2402	4	8	2410	5	8	2418	5	1	2419	6	1	2420	6	0	2420	6	1	2421	6	1	2422	6	1	2423	6	5	2428	6	Duncan Cameron	14	2442	6	10	2452	6	17	2469	6	1	2470	6	0	2470	6	6	2476	6	37	2513	6	5	2518	6	0	2518	6	27	2545	6
George Armstrong	2767	3	420	3187	4	0	3187	4	53	3240	4	1	3241	4	0	3241	4	0	3241	4	2	3243	4	20	3263	4	2	3265	4	George Armstrong	5	3270	4	1	3271	4	1	3272	4	7	3279	4	12	3291	4	4	3295	4	2	3297	4	3	3300	4	26	3326	4	9	3335	4
Edith Rogers	1541	8	25	1566	10	6	1572	10	4	1576	10	0	1576	10	2	1578	10	10	1588	10	1	1589	10	0	1589	10	4	1593	10	Edith Rogers	9	1602	10	20	1622	11	21	1643	11	6	1649	11	3	1652	11	7	1659	11	46	1705	10	44	1749	11	3	1752	11	17	1769	11
W.J. Tupper	1500	10	5	1505	11	1	1506	11	0	1506	11	1	1507	11	15	1522	11	0	1522	11	4	1526	11	1	1527	11	8	1535	11	W.J. Tupper	11	1546	11	102	1648	10	8	1656	10	10	1666	10	6	1672	10	28	1700	10	4	1704	11	72	1776	10	1	1777	10	22	1799	10
R.B. Russell	1535	9	493	2028	7	0	2028	7	163	2191	7	6	2197	7	2	2199	7	2	2201	7	2	2203	7	24	2227	7	2	2229	7	R.B. Russell	7	2236	7	0	2236	7	0	2236	7	2	2238	7	63	2301	7	2	2303	7	5	2308	7	3	2311	7	52	2363	7	4	2367	7
Harriet Dick	1307	11	133	1440	12	1	1441	12	8	1449	12	2	1451	12	2	1453	12	26	1479	12	2	1481	12	4	1485	12	12	1497	12	Harriet Dick	18	1515	12	2	1517	12	7	1524	12	1	1525	12	12	1537	12	15	1552	12	21	1573	12	100	1673	12	12	1685	12	59	1744	12
Robert Jacob	1206	14	34	1240	14	10	1250	14	8	1258	14	2	1260	14	2	1262	14	4	1266	14	3	1269	14	3	1272	14	8	1280	14	Robert Jacob	15	1295	14	12	1307	14	73	1380	13	4	1384	13	3	1387	13	3	1390	14	47	1437	13	3	1440	13	2	1442	13	23	1465	13
William Morden	1150	16	81	1231	15	1	1232	15	9	1241	15	4	1245	15	8	1253	15	4	1257	15	3	1260	15	1	1261	15	8	1269	15	William Morden	20	1289	15	5	1294	15	6	1300	15	25	1325	15	2	1327	15	43	1370	15	14	1384	15	4	1388	15	7	1395	15	35	1430	15
N.D. Armstrong	1174	15	33	1207	16	0	1207	16	2	1209	16	1	1210	16	3	1213	16	6	1219	16	2	1221	16	0	1221	16	4	1225	16	N.D. Armstrong	11	1236	16	6	1242	16	1	1243	16	7	1250	16	1	1251	16	8	1259	16	13	1272	16	11	1283	16	3	1286	16	29	1315	16
W.J. Christie	1274	12	23	1297	13	0	1297	13	1	1298	13	4	1302	13	2	1304	13	1	1305	13	4	1309	13	0	1309	13	14	1323	13	W.J. Christie	3	1326	13	18	1344	13	0	1344	14	17	1361	14	2	1363	14	27	1390	13	2	1392	14	35	1427	14	1	1428	14	28	1456	14
William Parrish	945	17	13	958	17	18	976	17	2	978	17	2	980	17	0	980	17	4	984	17	1	985	17	2	987	17	5	992	17	William Parrish	8	1000	17	6	1006	17	29	1035	17	1	1036	17	1	1037	17	6	1043	17	21	1064	17	5	1069	17	4	1073	19	22	1095	19
S. Cartwright	452	23	436	888	19	0	888	19	68	956	18	2	958	18	0	958	18	1	959	18	1	960	18	7	967	18	1	968	18	S. Cartwright	3	971	18	1	972	18	0	972	18	5	977	18	32	1009	18	5	1014	18	7	1021	19	3	1024	19	109	1133	17	11	1144	17
Leo Warde	845	18	49	894	18	1	895	18	3	898	19	1	899	19	4	903	19	3	906	19	2	908	19	1	909	20	9	918	20	Leo Warde	13	931	20	14	945	20	14	959	19	3	962	19	8	970	20	3	973	21	49	1022	18	11	1033	18	3	1036	20	23	1059	20
Eleanor Pritchard	443	24	282	725	23	0	725	23	163	888	20	2	890	20	0	890	20	3	893	20	2	895	20	53	948	19	0	948	19	Eleanor Pritchard	2	950	19	0	950	19	3	953	20	1	954	20	19	973	19	6	979	20	5	984	21	3	987	21	104	1091	18	8	1099	18
William Gibbon	792	19	54	846	20	4	850	20	2	852	21	1	853	22	6	859	21	0	? 859	21	6	865	21	0	865	21	3	868	21	William Gibbon	6	874	21	2	876	21	21	897	21	7	904	21	3	907	21	2	909	22	19	928	22	6	934	22	2	936	22	25	961	22
Neil T. Carey	776	21	54	830	21	0	830	21	1	831	22	22	853	21	0	853	22	0	853	22	1	854	22	0	854	22	0	854	22	Neil T. Carey	3	857	22	0	857	22	0	857	23	37	894	22	0	894	22	106	(Note: likely incorrect) 1000	19	0	1000	20	2	1002	20	2	1004	21	10	1014	21
Thomas Hamilton	786	20	31	817	22	6	823	22	1	824	23	0	824	23	0	824	23	1	825	23	1	826	23	2	828	23	0	828	23	Thomas Hamilton	6	834	23	1	835	23	23	858	22	10	868	23	0	868	*23	3	871	23	25	896	23	10	906	23	0	906	23	12	918	23
J. Lightfoot	554	22	40	594	24	0	594	24	3	597	24	3	600	24	8	608	24	3	611	24	17	628	24	4	632	24	11	643	24	J. Lightfoot	5	648	24	22	670	24	1	671	24	9	680	24	0	680	24	41	721	24	44	765	24	44	809	24	9	818	24	24	842	24
E.B. Fisher	431	25	43	474	25	0	474	25	1	475	25	4	479	25	1	480	25	0	480	25	0	480	25	0	480	25	2	482	25	E.B. Fisher	13	495	25	0	495	25	2	497	25	4	501	25	0	501	25	2	503	25	1	504	25	4	508	25	0	508	25	-508	dist'ed	25
W. A. James	56	38	90	146	35	0	146	36	207	353	28	4	357	28	1	358	28	4	362	28	1	363	28	18	381	28	4	385	28	W. A. James	1	386	28	0	386	28	0	386	28	6	392	28	77	469	26	3	472	26	2	474	26	1	475	26	-475	dist'ed	26			
G. Lipsett	359	27	13	372	27	0	372	27	1	373	27	1	374	27	4	? 378	27	14	392	27	2	394	27	0	394	27	11	405	27	G. Lipsett	10	415	27	10	425	27	1	426	27	4	430	27	2	432	28	22	454	27	7	461	27	-461	dist'ed	27						
F.W. Law	368	26	28	396	26	3	399	26	4	403	26	2	405	26	2	407	26	5	412	26	1	413	26	3	416	26	2	418	26	F.W. Law	4	422	26	6	428	26	16	444	26	2	446	26	1	447	27	3	450	28	-450	dist'ed	28									
A. MacMartin	189	33	13	202	34	0	202	34	1	203	35	2	205	35	0	205	35	0	205	35	76	281	31	1	282	31	44	326	29	A. MacMartin	4	330	29	6	336	29	2	338	29	4	342	29	0	342	29	-342	dist'ed	29												
Fred Tipping	95	36	123	218	33	0	218	33	70	288	30	1	289	30	3	292	30	3	295	30	0	295	30	4	299	30	1	300	31	Fred Tipping	9	309	31	2	311	30	0	311	30	2	313	30	-313	dist'ed	30															
Charles Forrester	282	28	18	300	28	0	300	28	1	301	29	2	303	29	2	305	29	3	308	29	0	308	29	0	308	29	1	309	30	Charles Forrester	0	309	30	0	309	31	0	309	31	-309	dist'ed	31																		
R.N. Lowery	254	30	10	264	30	3	267	29	2	269	31	0	269	31	0	269	31	4	273	31	2	275	32	2	277	32	5	282	32	R.N. Lowery	2	284	32	0	284	32	-284	dist'ed	32																					
P.V. Torrance	265	29	1	266	29	0	266	30	0	266	32	1	267	32	2	269	32	0	269	32	0	269	33	0	269	33	12	281	33	P.V. Torrance	1	282	33	-282	dist'ed	33																								
George Prout	219	31	33	252	31	1	253	31	4	257	33	0	257	33	0	257	33	1	258	33	1	259	34	2	261	34	0	261	34	George Prout	-261	dist'ed	34																											
Malcolm McInnes	218	32	5	223	32	0	223	32	1	224	34	0	224	34	5	229	34	0	229	34	1	230	35	0	230	35	-230	dist'ed	35	Malcolm McInnes																														
Dickie Johns	52	39	52	104	38	0	104	38	65	169	36	1	170	36	0	170	36	2	172	36	1	173	36	-173	dist'ed	36				Dickie Johns																														
G.H. Lawrence	135	34	18	153	36	0	153	35	2	155	37	1	156	37	1	157	37	2	159	37	-159	dist'ed	37							G.H. Lawrence																														
Ann Holling	105	35	23	128	37	0	128	37	1	129	38	1	130	38	1	131	38	-131	0 (dist'ed)	38										Ann Holling																														
J. O. Turnbull	88	37	2	90	39	0	90	39	0	90	39	0	90	39	-90	0 (dist'ed)	39													J. O. Turnbull																														
David S. Lyons	45	40	4	49	40	0	49	40	1	50	40	-50	0 (dist'ed)	40																David S. Lyons																														
J. H. Gislason	28	41	11	39	41	0	39	41	1	40	41	-40	0 (dist'ed)	41																J. H. Gislason																														
Candidate	1st		2nd			3rd			4th			5th			6th			7th			8th			9th			10th			Candidate	11th			12th			13th			14th			15th			16th			17th			18th			19th			20th		
Total Valid	47427			47427			47427			47427			47423		(Note: Error: Total gains exceeded distributed tally. Error to be abridged by reducing the exhausted tally (this is an abridgement and not reconciliation as ballot cannot be un-exhausted once it has exhausted))	47424			47418			47414			47412			47408				47402			47397			47399			47290			47278			47351			47341			47321			47319			47306	
(Note: Exhausted tally is notional and not actual, calculated at each count by taking the difference between the tally being redistributed and the sum of all the gain. Notations are made where part of exhausted tally were used to abridge apparent or irreconcilable recording errors.)Exhaust												4	4		-1	3		6	9		4	13		2	15		4	19			6	25		5	30		-2	28		109	137		12	149		-73	(Note: The probable significant error introduced in the tally of Carey at the 16th count meant that the notional exhausted tallies from the 16th count to the 22nd count would be significant off from actual tallies.) 76		10	86		20	106		2	108		13	121	
Total	47427			47427			47427			47427			47427			47427			47427			47427			47427			47427				47427			47427			47427			47427			47427			47427			47427			47427			47427			47427	

=== 21st to 38th counts ===
remaining	7 / 21			7 / 20			7 / 19			7 / 18			7 / 17			7 / 16			7 / 15			7 / 14			7 / 13			7 / 12				7 / 11			6 / 9			5 / 7			3 / 4			3 / 4			3 / 4			3 / 4			3/4		
Elected or eliminated	Lightfoot elim.			Hamilton elim.			Carey elim.			Gibbon elim.			Pritchard elim.			Warde elim.			Cartwright elim.			Parrish elim.			Christie elim.			N. Armstrong elim.				Morden elim. Haig elected			Jacob elim. Queen elected			Dick elim. Stovel, Cameron elected			Haig's surplus			Queen's surplus			Stovel surplus			Cameron surplus			Russell declared defeated		
Count #	21st			22nd			23rd			24th			25th			26th			27th			28th			29th			30th				31st			32nd			33rd			34th			35th			36th			37th			38th		
Candidate	±	Votes	#	±	Votes	#	±	Votes	#	±	Votes	#	±	Votes	#	±	Votes	#	±	Votes	#	±	Votes	#	±	Votes	#	±	Votes	#	Candidate	±	Votes	#	±	Votes	#	±	Votes	#	±	Votes	#	±	Votes	#	±	Votes	#	±	Votes	#	±	Votes	#
Fred Dixon	E	4312	1	E	4312	1	E	4312	1	E	4312	1	E	4312	1	E	4312	1	E	4312	1	E	4312	1	E	4312	1	E	4312	1	Fred Dixon	E	4312	1	E	4312	1	E	4312	1	E	4312	1	E	4312	1	E	4312	1	E	4312	1	E	4312	1
Thomas Johnson	E	4312	2	E	4312	2	E	4312	2	E	4312	2	E	4312	2	E	4312	2	E	4312	2	E	4312	2	E	4312	2	E	4312	2	Thomas Johnson	E	4312	2	E	4312	2	E	4312	2	E	4312	2	E	4312	2	E	4312	2	E	4312	2	E	4312	2
Bill Ivens	E	4312	3	E	4312	3	E	4312	3	E	4312	3	E	4312	3	E	4312	3	E	4312	3	E	4312	3	E	4312	3	E	4312	3	Bill Ivens	0	4312	3	E	4312	3	E	4312	3	E	4312	3	E	4312	3	E	4312	3	E	4312	3	E	4312	3
J.T. Haig	145	2442	7	33	2475	7	87	2562	7	59	2621	7	5	2626	8	69	2695	8	31	2726	8	52	2778	9	1016	3794	6	226	4020	5	J.T. Haig	396	4416	4	0	4416	4	0	4416	4	-104	4312	4	E	4312	4	E	4312	4	E	4312	4	E	4312	4
John Queen	14	2743	5	14	2757	5	83	2840	5	11	2851	6	540	3391	5	40	3431	5	439	3870	4	17	3887	4	20	3907	4	180	4087	4	John Queen	187	4274	5	58	4332	5	0	4332	5	0	4332	5	-20	4312	5	E	4312	5	E	4312	5	E	4312	5
John Stovel	38	2025	9	122	2147	9	26	2173	9	159	2332	9	5	2337	9	93	2430	9	24	2454	9	507	2961	8	50	3011	9	127	3138	8	John Stovel	193	3331	8	764	4095	8	579	4674	6		4674	6	0	4674	6	-362	4312	6	E	4312	6	E	4312	6
Duncan Cameron	20	2565	6	156	2721	6	31	2752	6	218	2970	5	3	2973	6	48	3021	6	9	3030	6	250	3280	6	32	3312	7	149	3461	7	Duncan Cameron	101	3562	7	561	4123	6	271	4394	7	E	4394	7	0	4394	7	0	4394	7	-82	4312	7	E	4312	7
George Armstrong	14	3349	4	7	3356	4	24	3380	4	10	3390	4	69	3459	4	34	3493	4	363	3856	5	3	3859	5	10	3869	5	137	4006	6	George Armstrong	84	4090	6	13	4103	7	-	unknown	?	(Note: total of gains in 33rd count and 34th count)142	4245	8	0	4245	8	13	4258	8	24	4282	8	0	4282	8
Edith Rogers	38	1807	11	116	1923	11	24	1947	11	126	2073	10	7	2080	10	74	2154	10	23	2177	10	212	2389	10	34	2423	11	147	2570	11	Edith Rogers	124	2694	12	495	3189	10	-	unknown	?	612	3801	9	4	3805	9	142	3947	9	63	4010	9	0	4010	9
W.J. Tupper	139	1938	10	12	1950	10	93	2043	10	14	2057	11	3	2060	11	55	2115	11	10	2125	12	38	2163	12	338	2501	10	97	2598	10	W.J. Tupper	324	2922	11	147	3069	11	-	unknown	?	419	3488	10	0	3488	11	31	3519	10	? 63	3582	10	0	3582	10
R.B. Russell	9	2376	8	4	2380	8	18	2398	8	7	2405	8	415	2820	7	32	2852	7	178	3030	7	10	3040	7	3	3043	8	71	3114	9	R.B. Russell	92	3206	9	20	3226	9	-	unknown	?	261	3487	11	16	3503	10	16	3519	10	1	3520	11		3520 (Note: not transferred and not used to elect anyone)	11
Harriet Dick	25	1769	12	47	1816	12	94	1910	12	81	1991	12	14	2005	12	81	2086	12	84	2170	11	43	2213	11	75	2288	12	270	2558	12	Harriet Dick	185	2743	10	191	2934	12	-2934	dist'ed	12															
Robert Jacob	14	1479	15	150	1629	13	19	1648	14	156	1804	13	5	1809	13	66	1875	13	22	1897	13	222	2119	13	29	2148	13	75	2223	13	Robert Jacob	124	2347	13	-2347	dist'ed	13																		
William Morden	82	1512	14	13	1525	15	120	1645	15	15	1660	14	7	1667	14	87	1754	14	44	1798	15	13	1811	15	58	1869	14		unknown	14	William Morden	-??	dist'ed	14																					
N.D. Armstrong	52	1367	16	14	1381	16	24	1405	16	15	1420	16	6	1426	16	303	1729	15	76	1805	14	15	1820	14	24	1844	15	-1844	dist'ed	15	N.D. Armstrong																								
W.J. Christie	92	1548	13	10	1558	14	92	1650	13	9	1659	15	1	1660	15	22	1682	16	23	1705	16	21	1726	16	-1726	dist'ed	16				W.J. Christie																								
William Parrish	21	1116	19	103	1219	17	41	1260	17	122	1382	17	1	1383	17	36	1419	17	5	1424	17	-1424	dist'ed	17							William Parrish																								
S. Cartwright	13	1157	17	5	1162	18	50	1212	18	11	1223	18	55	1278	18	106	1384	18	-1384	dist'ed	18										S. Cartwright																								
Leo Warde	43	1102	20	15	1117	20	46	1163	19	25	1188	19	13	1201	19	-1201	dist'ed	19													Leo Warde																								
Eleanor Pritchard	20	1119	18	5	1124	19	23	1147	20	8	1155	20	-1155	dist'ed	20																Eleanor Pritchard																								
William Gibbon	11	972	22	87	1059	21	8	1067	21	-1067	dist'ed	21																			William Gibbon																								
Neil T. Carey	4	1018	21	1	1019	22	-1019	dist'ed	22																						Neil T. Carey																								
Thomas Hamilton	16	934	23	-934	dist'ed																										Thomas Hamilton																								
J. Lightfoot	-842	dist'ed	24																												J. Lightfoot																								
		21st		22nd			23rd			24th			25th			26th			27th			28th			29th			30th				31st			32nd			33rd			34th			35th			36th			37th			38th		
Total Valid		47274			47254			47138			47117			47111			47056			47003			46982			46945			46820				46521			46423			(Note: Numbers for the 33rd count not listed. Dick eliminated. Stovel elected with 4674 votes; Cameron elected with 4394 votes.)		(Note: Due to lack of tally reports for the 33rd count, gains calculation for the 34th count was done against the 32nd count.)	45,669			45669			45509			45578			42038	
Exhaust	32	153		20	173	Black, white, and red alert	116	289		21	310		6	316		55	371		53	424		21	245		37	482		125	607			299	906		98	1004		-	-		754 (Note: Due to lack of tally reports for the 33rd count, gains calculation for the 34th count was done against the 32nd count.)	1758		0	1758		160	1918		-69	(Note: Actual reported exhausted tally.)1849				
Total		47427			47427			47427			47427			47427			47427			47427			47427			47427			47427				47427			47427			47,427			47,427			47427			47427			47427			47427	

==== Sources ====
The first ballot results for Winnipeg and results for all other constituencies are taken from an official Manitoba government publication entitled "Manitoba elections, 1920-1941" (cross-referenced with an appendix to the government's report of the 2003 provincial election). The Canadian Parliamentary Guide for 1921 lists slightly different results for Dufferin and Gladstone; the other two sources contain more information, however, and may be taken as more reliable.

All ballot results for Winnipeg after the first count are taken from reports in the Winnipeg Free Press newspaper. There were some apparent errors in the reporting. Those errors were noted in the datatable and were abridged with exhausted ballot tallies.

== Post-election changes ==
The Independent and Farmer members formed a parliamentary bloc after the election, known as the Independent-Farmer group. St. George MLA Albert Kristjansson later left the Labour caucus to sit with this group.

Two were appointed to the cabinet, and they faced administrative by-elections as was the rule in those days.

Birtle (George Malcolm appointed to cabinet, September 30, 1920. October 14, 1920 by-election:

- George Malcolm (L) accl.

Lakeside (Charles Duncan McPherson appointed to cabinet, January 20, 1921. January 31, 1921 by-election:

- Charles Duncan McPherson (L) 1176
- E. Herbert Muir (F) 1020
