= Skuli Sigfusson =

Canadian politician (1870–1969)

Skuli Sigfusson (October 1, 1870 – November 27, 1969) was a politician in Manitoba, Canada. He served in the Legislative Assembly of Manitoba on three occasions: from 1915 to 1920, 1922 to 1936, and 1941 to 1945.

== Early life ==
Sigfusson was born to an Icelandic family living in Nordfjordur, Iceland. He was educated at home and came to Canada in 1887 to work as a farmer and rancher. He married Gudrun Arnason, daughter of Arnor Arnason, of Chicago, in January 1908. They had seven children: Arthur F. Sigfusson, E. Maria Sigfusson, Svein O. Sigfusson, Skuli A. Sigfusson, Sigurdur Jon (Siggi) Sigfusson, Olaf Sigfusson(McMahon), Thomas Sigfusson. He first ran for the Manitoba legislature in the 1914 provincial election.

== Professional life ==
As Liberal, he lost the constituency of St. George to Conservative Edmund L. Taylor by 101 votes.

The Conservative government of Rodmond Roblin was forced to resign amid scandal in early 1915. Sigfusson ran again in that year's provincial election, and defeated his Conservative opponent Paul Reykdal by 460 votes. The Liberals won a landslide victory in this election, and Sigfusson served as a backbench supporter of Tobias Norris's government.

Manitoba's political culture changed significantly between 1915 and 1920, after the Winnipeg General Strike and the rise of labour politics. Sigfusson lost his seat to Albert Kristjansson of the Labour Party in the 1920 provincial election, as the Liberals were reduced to a precarious minority government.

The Liberals were defeated in the 1922 provincial election. Despite the provincial trend against his party, however, Sigfusson was returned to the legislature via a convincing victory over Kristjansson, who had left the Labour Party to join the United Farmers of Manitoba. He was re-elected over both Reykdal and Kristjansson in the 1927 election.

In 1932, the Liberals joined with the Progressive Party of Manitoba to create a "Liberal-Progressive" alliance. Sigfusson was re-elected under this banner in the 1932 provincial election, defeating a Conservative opponent by 500 votes. He again served as a government backbencher, supporting the government of John Bracken.

In the 1936 provincial election, Sigfusson was upset by Salome Halldorson of the upstart Social Credit League. He ran again in the 1941 election, however, and defeated Halldorson by a significant margin.

== Later years ==
Sigfusson retired from the legislature in 1945. He died in 1969, at age ninety-nine.
