= Robert B. Russell =

Robert Boyd Russell
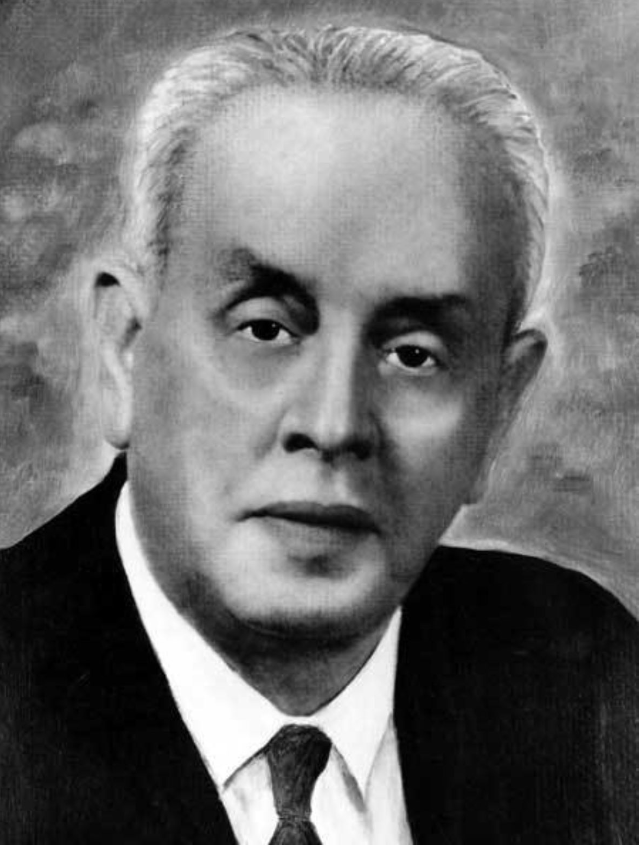
- Russell, ca. 1940s
- Born: Robert Boyd Russell; October 31, 1888; Glasgow, Scotland
- Died: September 25, 1964 (aged 74); Winnipeg, Manitoba, Canada
- Occupations: labour organizer, politician
- Political party: Socialist Party of Canada

R.B. (Robert Boyd) Russell (October 31, 1888 – September 25, 1964) was a socialist Canadian trade unionist, labour organizer, and politician. He was a prominent figure in the Winnipeg General Strike of 1919 and was later the leader of Winnipeg's One Big Union.

== Biography ==
Born in Scotland, Russell was raised in Glasgow and came to Canada in 1911. He moved to Winnipeg, and worked as a machinist in the Canadian Pacific Railway's Weston Shops. He was a member of the Machinists Union Local Lodge 122 in Winnipeg. He also became a prominent member of the Socialist Party of Canada, which at the time represented the left wing of the labour movement in Manitoba.

In 1919, he attended the Western Labour Conference in Calgary, Alberta, which called for the replacement of narrow craft unionism with an industrial union known as the One Big Union. During the Winnipeg General Strike, he was prominent figure on the Strike Committee which managed most of the city's affairs.

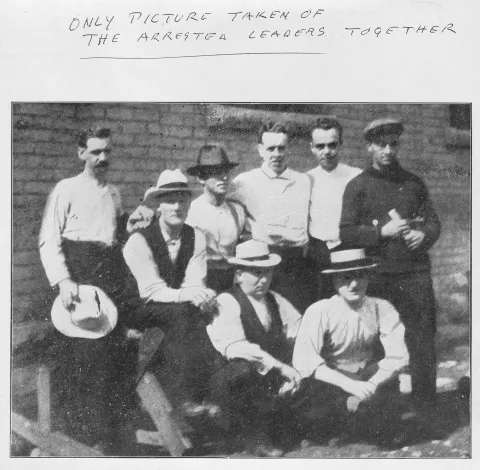
Back row: Roger Ernest Bray, George Armstrong, John Queen, Robert Boyd Russell, Richard James Johns and Bill Pritchard. Front row: Reverend William Ivens and Abraham Albert Heaps.

After the strike was suppressed, Russell and the other strike leaders were charged with seditious conspiracy. The star witness for the Crown was the undercover Mountie Frank Zaneth. The first of the strikers to go on trial, he was sentenced to a two-year term at Stony Mountain Penitentiary. Many observers at the time, and many since, have regarded the trials as unjust and politically motivated.

The strike and the resulting arrests created a temporary climate of labour unity in the city. The SPC had previously opposed "popular front" campaigns with centrist labour parties, and Russell himself had argued in 1918 that it was pointless to elect labour representatives to capitalist legislatures. Nevertheless, the SPC agreed to field a United Labour slate for the 1920 provincial election. Russell, still serving his sentence, ran as an SPC candidate in the constituency of Winnipeg, which elected ten members by a single transferable ballot. He came close to being elected, finishing ninth on the first count and missing the tenth seat by only sixty-two votes on the final tally. Russell's fellow prisoner George Armstrong was elected, making him the only SPC member ever to serve in the Manitoba legislature.

Russell also ran for the Socialist Party of Canada in the 1921 federal election, contesting the single-member riding of Winnipeg North. He finished a close second, losing to Liberal Edward James McMurray by 715 votes.

Russell returned to labour activism following his release from prison in 1922. He was selected as the leader of the Winnipeg's One Big Union, and held this position into the 1950s.

He campaigned again for the Manitoba legislature in the 1927 provincial election in the constituency of Assiniboia with the support of Manitoba's Independent Labour Party, falling by a narrow margin to Conservative candidate Joseph Cotter.

Russell died in Winnipeg on September 25, 1964.

R.B. Russell Vocational High School was named after him in 1966.
