= Samuel Hayden =

Canadian politician

Samuel M. Hayden (October 6, 1858 – October 27, 1934) was a Canadian politician in Manitoba. He served in the Legislative Assembly of Manitoba from 1915 to 1920, as a member of the Liberal Party.

Hayden resided in Killarney, Manitoba during his political career. He first ran for the Manitoba legislature in the provincial election of 1914, and lost to Conservative incumbent George Lawrence by 68 votes in the Killarney constituency. He ran again in the 1915 election, and defeated Lawrence by 123 votes. The Liberals won a landslide majority in this election and Hayden served for the next five years as a backbench supporter of Tobias Norris's government.

He ran for re-election in the 1920 campaign, but lost to Farmer candidate Samuel Fletcher by 396 votes.

Hayden died in the Rural Municipality of Turtle Mountain at the age of 76.
