= St. George (provincial electoral district) =

St. George may refer to:

- St. George (Manitoba provincial electoral district)
- St. George (Ontario provincial electoral district)
