= Winona Flett =

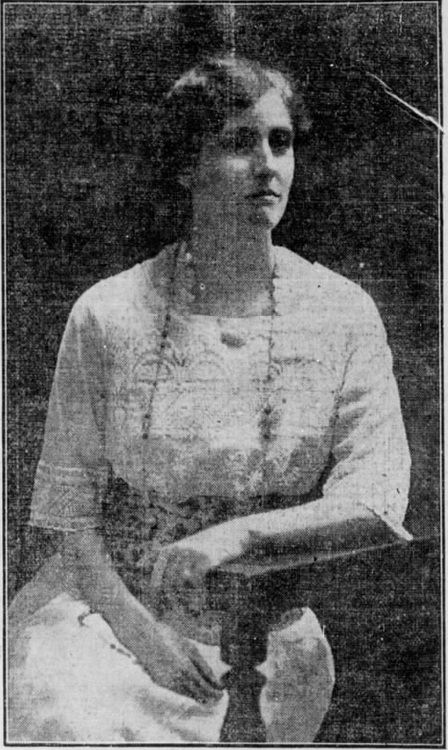
- Winona Flett in 1914
- Born: Winona Margaret Flett; June 10, 1884; South Dumfries Township, Ontario
- Died: May 16, 1922 (aged 37); Winnipeg, Manitoba
- Occupation(s): Suffragist, social reformer
- Spouse: Fred Dixon

Winona Margaret Flett (June 10, 1884 – May 16, 1922) was a prominent suffragist and social reformer in Manitoba.

== Life ==
Flett was born in South Dumfries Township, Ontario, the daughter of Isabella Bowie and James Flett. She left Woodstock, Ontario in 1912 for Winnipeg with her mother and sister Lynn. She worked there as a public stenographer. Flett and her sister helped found the Political Equality League (later the Manitoba Political Equality League), whose aim was to gain the vote for women in the province. She was in charge of a petition organized by this group which bore the signatures of 39,584 women. The petition was photographed for posterity and the four women included in the photograph are Flett, the league's president Mary Elizabeth Crawford, the league's secretary, Lillian Kate Beynon Thomas, and the oldest signatory of the petition, Amelia Burrell.

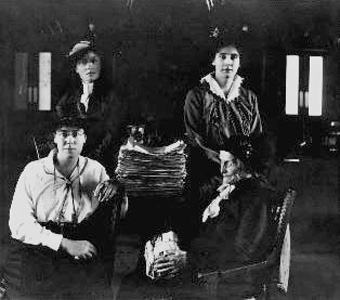
Presentation of petition on 23 December 1915

The petition was to Tobias Crawford Norris who had won a victory for the Liberal party that August. In January 1916, Manitoba became the first province in Canada to grant women the vote. Eight women were honoured with being present for the third reading of the suffrage bill and Flett was included in that group.

In October 1914, Flett married Fred Dixon, a Manitoba politician.

She campaigned for her husband in the 1920 general election.

She frequently spoke at J. S. Woodsworth's "Peoples' Forums", a series of Sunday afternoon lectures.

Flett died of pneumonia in Winnipeg at the age of 37. Her funeral was attended by Liberal and Labour politicians, including Tobias Norris, the premier of the province.
