= Dominion Labour Party =

Dominion Labour Party may refer to:

- Dominion Labor Party (Alberta)
- Dominion Labour Party (Manitoba)
