= George Thomas Armstrong =

Canadian politician

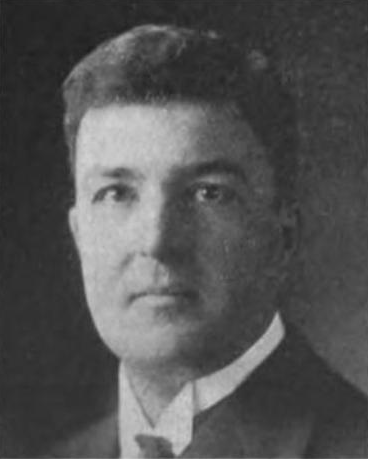

Member of the Legislative Assembly of Manitoba
- In office 1915–1920

Personal details
- Born: February 19, 1881; Huntley Township, Ontario
- Died: September 9, 1941 (aged 60); Morden, Manitoba
- Political party: Liberal
- Spouse: Margaret E. McTavish (m. 1907)
- Education: University of Manitoba
- Occupation: Lawyer, politician

George Thomas Armstrong (February 19, 1881 – September 9, 1941) was a politician in Manitoba, Canada. He served in the Legislative Assembly of Manitoba from 1915 to 1920, as a member of the Liberal Party.

== Biography ==
Armstrong was born in Huntley Township, Carleton County, Ontario, the son of Hugh Armstrong, and was educated at Manitoba public schools. He received a Bachelor of Laws degree from the University of Manitoba. He was called to the Manitoba bar in 1905 and practised law in Manitou. Armstrong was also a prominent freemason, and a member of the Church of England. In 1907, he married Margaret E. McTavish. He was named a King's Counsel in 1920.

He was first elected to the Manitoba legislature in the 1915 provincial election, defeating Conservative W.H. Sharpe by 84 votes in the constituency of Manitou. The Liberals won a landslide majority in this election, and Armstrong served as a backbench supporter of Tobias Norris's government for the next five years.

He ran for re-election in the 1920 campaign but finished third against Conservative John Ridley, losing by 284 votes.

In 1929, Armstrong was named county court judge for the southern judicial district of Manitoba.

He died in Morden after an extended illness at the age of 60.
