= Results of the 1930 Canadian federal election =

1930 Canadian federal election

== Alberta ==
Results in Alberta
Party	Seats	Second	Third	Fourth	Votes	%	+/-
Conservative	4	6	1	0	70,050	34.97	
Liberals	3	6	2	0	60,126	30.02	
United Farmers of Alberta	9	1	0	0	56,968	28.44	
Labour Farmer	0	1	0	0	6,002	3	
Progressive	0	1	0	0	3,880	1.94	
Labour Farmer	0	0	1	1	3,276	1.64	
Total	16				200,302	100.0	

== British Columbia ==
Results in British Columbia
Party	Seats	Second	Third	Fourth	Votes	%	+/-
Conservative	7	7	0	0	119,074	49.28	
Liberals	5	7	0	0	98,933	40.94	
Independent Labour	1	0	0	0	15,732	6.51	
Independent	1	0	1	0	6,338	2.62	
Communist	0	0	1	0	861	0.36	
Franc Lib	0	0	1	0	429	0.18	
Prohibitionist	0	0	0	1	266	0.11	
Total	14				241,633	100.0	

== Manitoba ==
Results in Manitoba
Party	Seats	Second	Third	Fourth	Fifth	Votes	%	+/-
Conservative	11	5	0	0	0	109,266	46.82	
Liberals	1	4	1	1	0	45,628	19.55	
Liberal-Progressive	3	4	0	0	0	37,917	16.25	
Labour Farmer	2	0	3	0	0	19,552	8.38	
Progressive	0	3	0	0	0	15,008	6.43	
Independent Conservative	0	1	1	0	0	2,743	1.18	
Communist	0	0	2	0	0	2,201	0.94	
Independent Liberal	0	0	0	1	1	818	0.35	
Independent Labour	0	0	1	0	0	256	0.11	
Total	17					233,389	100.0	

== New Brunswick ==
Results in New Brunswick
Party	Seats	Second	Third	Votes	%	+/-
Conservative	10	1	0	109,716	59.29	
Liberals	1	9	1	75,342	40.71	
Total	11			185,058	100.0	

== Nova Scotia ==
Results in Nova Scotia
Party	Seats	Second	Third	Votes	%	+/-
Conservative	10	4	0	140,503	52.49	
Liberals	4	9	1	127,179	47.51	
Total	14			267,682	100.0	

== Ontario ==
Results in Ontario
Party	Seats	Second	Third	Fourth	Votes	%	+/-
Conservative	59	20	1	0	733,219	53.93	
Liberals	22	56	1	0	576,994	42.44	
Progressive	1	3	0	0	25,080	1.84	
Unknown	0	1	1	0	7,441	0.55	
Liberal-Labour	0	1	0	0	7,195	0.53	
Independent Conservative	0	0	2	1	6,381	0.47	
Communist	0	0	3	0	1,495	0.11	
Labour Farmer	0	0	1	1	994	0.07	
Independent	0	0	2	0	774	0.06	
Total	82				1,359,573	100.0	

== Prince Edward Island ==
Results in Prince Edward Island
Party	Seats	Second	Third	Votes	%	+/-
Liberals	1	2	1	29,698	50.01	
Conservative	3	1	0	29,692	49.99	
Total	4			59,390	100.0	

== Quebec ==
Results in Quebec
Party	Seats	Second	Third	Fourth	Votes	%	+/-
Liberals	40	23	1	0	542,375	53.18	
Conservative	24	40	0	1	455,763	44.69	
Independent Liberal	0	1	4	1	13,608	1.33	
Independent	1	0	3	0	2,935	0.29	
Liberal Protectionist	0	0	1	0	2,723	0.27	
Independent Progressive	0	0	1	0	1,294	0.13	
Independent Conservative	0	0	0	1	1,236	0.12	
Total	65				1,019,934	100.0	

== Saskatchewan ==
Results in Saskatchewan
Party	Seats	Second	Third	Votes	%	+/-
Liberals	12	9	1	154,656	46.84	
Conservative	7	8	1	116,112	35.17	
Progressive	2	1	4	26,854	8.13	
Farmer	0	0	5	11,999	3.63	
Independent	0	2	1	11,561	3.5	
Liberal-Progressive	0	1	0	6,905	2.09	
Farmer-Labour	0	0	1	2,091	0.63	
Total	21			330,178	100.0	

== Yukon ==
Results in Yukon
Party	Seats	Second	Votes	%	+/-
Conservative	1	0	846	60.3	
Liberals	0	1	557	39.7	
Total	1		1,403	100.0	
