= William Findlater =

William Findlater may refer to:

- William Findlater (Manitoba politician) (1871–1962), Liberal Party member of the Legislative Assembly of Manitoba 1915–1922
- William Findlater (Irish politician) (born 1924), member of parliament for Monaghan 1880–1885
