= Emil Moeller =

Canadian politician

Emil Moeller (September 16, 1902 – October 28, 1986) was a politician in Manitoba, Canada. He served as a Progressive Conservative member of the Legislative Assembly of Manitoba from 1962 to 1966.

The son of Karl and Anna Moeller, he was born in Dellstedt, Germany and came to Canada with his parents in 1930, settling in the Teulon area. With his brother, Moeller operated a large sugar beet and grain farm. He was a member of the Manitoba Sugar Beet Association, the Manitoba Hog Producers', the Interlake School Division, the Manitoba Pool Elevators - Teulon Branch, the local Chamber of Commerce and the Hunter Memorial Hospital. He raised two sons with his wife Grete.

Moeller was elected under controversial circumstances in the 1962 provincial election, in the mid-northern Manitoba riding of Fisher. New Democratic Party incumbent Peter Wagner had originally been declared the winner, but a late report from the northern part of the riding indicated that a miscount had occurred, and gave Moeller the victory by 87 votes. Many believe that the result was rigged, and that Wagner actually received more votes.

Moeller does not appear to have played a significant role in the parliament which followed, and did not run for re-election in 1966.

He died at home in Teulon at the age of 84.
