= Peter Wagner (Manitoba politician) =

Canadian politician

Peter Wagner (June 6, 1916 in Fisher Branch, Manitoba – August 13, 1995) was a politician in Manitoba, Canada. He served in the Legislative Assembly of Manitoba from 1958 to 1962, at first for the Cooperative Commonwealth Federation and later for its successor party, the NDP.

Of German and Ukrainian background, Wagner was educated in Manitoba and worked as a farmer. Before entering politics, he was president of the local Cooperative Association and the Pool Association, also serving as chair of the local school board and as director of the Manitoba Farmer's Union in 1957.

He married Dora Mamchuk, who died in March 2012.

He was first elected to the Manitoba legislature in the 1958 provincial election, defeated incumbent Liberal-Progressive Nicholas Bachynsky by 56 votes in the mid-northern constituency of Fisher. He was re-elected by an increased margin in the 1959 election.

The CCF was the third-largest party during Wagner's tenure in the legislature. As an opposition member, he was a strong advocate for farming issues. In 1961, he participated in the CCF's transition to the New Democratic Party.

Wagner was defeated under controversial circumstances in the 1962 provincial election, losing to Progressive Conservative Emil Moeller by 87 votes. Wagner had initially been declared the winner, before a remote constituency poll declared that a miscount had occurred. Many believe the final result was fraudulent.

Wagner ran again in the 1966 election, but lost to Progressive Conservative Peter Masniuk by 112 votes.

He died in Hodgson at the age of 79.
