= Albert Kirvan =

Canadian politician

Albert Walmsley Kirvan (January 21, 1870 – May 6, 1951) was a politician in Manitoba, Canada. He was born in Meaford, Ontario. He served in the Legislative Assembly of Manitoba from 1920 to 1927, as a member of the Manitoba Liberal Party. He was first elected to the Manitoba legislature in the 1920 provincial election, winning a close five-candidate contest in the constituency of Fairford. From 1920 to 1922, Kirvan served as a backbench supporter of Tobias Norris's government.

Norris's Liberals were defeated in the 1922 provincial election. Kirvan was one of only eight Liberals elected, defeating G.L. Marron of the United Farmers of Manitoba by a significant margin. He was defeated in the 1927 election, losing to Progressive candidate Stuart Garson. He sought re-election in the 1932 campaign, but lost to Garson again by an increased margin.

He died at the age of 81.
