= John Stovel =

Canadian politician

John Stovel (March 10, 1858—May 30, 1923) was a publisher and politician in Manitoba, Canada. He served in the Legislative Assembly of Manitoba from 1920 to 1922 as a member of the Liberal Party.

Stovel was born in Mount Forest, Canada West (now Ontario), and educated in that community. He came to Winnipeg in 1884. Stovel served during the North-West Rebellion. He worked as a printer and publisher, becoming the director of Stovel Co., Ltd., Engravers, Lithographers and Printers. He was also a director of Nor'West Farmers (a farmer journal) and Standard Trust Co. In religion, Stovel was a Baptist. In 1886, he married Maggie McConnell.

He was elected to the Manitoba legislature in the 1920 provincial election, for the constituency of Winnipeg. At the time, Winnipeg elected ten members to the provincial legislature by a single transferable ballot. Stovel finished seventh on the first count, and was declared elected on the thirty-third count. The Liberals won a minority government in this election, and Stovel served in the legislature as a backbench supporter of Tobias Norris's government.

He did not seek re-election in the 1922 campaign.

Stovel died in Rochester, Minnesota, in 1923.
