= Duncan Cameron (Liberal MLA) =

Canadian politician (1865–1948)

Duncan Cameron (August 1, 1865 – October 8, 1948) was a politician in Manitoba, Canada. He served in the Legislative Assembly of Manitoba from 1920 to 1922, as a member of the Liberal Party.

== Early life and move to Canada ==
Cameron was born in Inverness, Scotland, and was educated in Inverness and Stafford, England. He came to Canada in 1885, and became manager of the D.E. Adams Coal Co. Ltd., retiring in 1943. Cameron was an active freemason, and served on the Winnipeg Board of Trade. He was elected to the Winnipeg School Board in 1917. In religion, he was a Presbyterian.

== Election to legislature ==
Cameron was elected to the Manitoba legislature in the 1920 provincial election, in the constituency of Winnipeg. At the time, Winnipeg elected ten members via a single transferable ballot. Cameron finished fourth on the first count, and was declared elected on the thirty-third count. The Liberal Party won a minority government in this election, and Cameron served as a backbench supporter of Tobias Norris's government for the next two years.

Running for re-election in the 1922 campaign, Cameron finished eighth on the first count but fell behind on transfers, and placed eleventh on the final ballot. He ran again in the 1927 election, but finished fifteenth on the first count and was eliminated on the nineteenth count.

Cameron tried again to return to the legislature in the 1932 campaign, as a supporter of the newly formed Liberal-Progressive alliance. He fared poorly, finishing in twenty-fourth place on the first count. He was eliminated on the eighth count.

== Death ==
He died in Toronto at the age of 83.
