= Matthew R. Sutherland =

Canadian politician (1894–1971)

Matthew Robinson Sutherland (July 18, 1894 – July 31, 1971) was a Canadian politician in Manitoba. He served in the Legislative Assembly of Manitoba as a Liberal-Progressive from 1936 to 1949, and again from 1953 to 1958.

The son of Robert Sutherland, Sutherland was born at Griswood, Manitoba. He was educated at local schools, and worked as a farmer. He was a shareholder in Co-Operative Dairy and Poultry, and enlisted for service in World War I in 1916. Sutherland also served for twenty years as a school trustee, and for fifteen as a steward in the United Church.

Sutherland was first elected to the Manitoba legislature in the 1953 provincial election, defeating Conservative candidate E.D. Adler by 191 votes in the constituency of Lansdowne. Sutherland, a Liberal, ran as a supporter of the province's Liberal-Progressive government.

Sutherland was re-elected by acclamation in the 1941 election, and easily defeated a challenger from the CCF in 1945.

From 1940 to 1950, Manitoba was governed by an alliance of Liberal-Progressives and Progressive Conservatives. In the 1949 provincial election, Sutherland lost his seat by forty votes to Progressive Conservative candidate Thomas Seens, who was also a supporter of the coalition government. The Progressive Conservatives left the coalition in 1950, and Sutherland defeated Seens in the 1953 election by over 400 votes.

Sutherland was never appointed to cabinet, and was a backbench supporter of the governments of John Bracken, Stuart Garson and Douglas Campbell. He did not run for re-election in 1958. He died in Souris, Manitoba on July 31, 1971, at the age of 77.
