= John C. W. Reid =

Canadian politician

John Christie Walker Reid (July 25, 1871—January 13, 1942) was a farmer and politician in Manitoba, Canada. He served in the Legislative Assembly of Manitoba from 1910 to 1914, as a member of the Conservative Party.

Reid was born in Edinburgh, Scotland, the son of William Reid, Writer to the Signet, and Elizabeth Geddes Walker, and was educated in that city. He came to Canada in 1889 and worked as a farmer. In religion, he was a Presbyterian.

He was elected to the Manitoba legislature in the 1910 provincial election, defeating Liberal incumbent Robert S. Thornton by six votes in Deloraine. The Conservatives won the election, and Reid served in the legislature as a government backbencher.

He was defeated in the 1914 election, losing his constituency seat to Thornton by 204 votes. He attempted to return to the legislature in the elections of 1915 and 1920, but lost both times to Thornton.

Reid died in Glenwood at the age of 70.
