= George Malcolm (politician) =

Canadian politician (1865–1930)

George John Huntley Malcolm (August 20, 1865–August 18, 1930) was a politician in Manitoba, Canada. He served in the Legislative Assembly of Manitoba as a Liberal from 1909 to 1922, and was a cabinet minister in the government of Tobias Norris.

Malcolm was born in Kussowlie, India, the son of British colonel George Malcolm. He was educated at King Edward VI school in Sherbourne, England, and moved to Canada in 1882. After attending the Guelph Agricultural College in Ontario for two years, he moved to Manitoba in 1885. He worked as a farmer, and served as Secretary-Treasurer of the Birtle Agricultural Society. Malcolm was also a school trustee. He was married twice: first to Janet T. Winter in 1891 and then to Adelaide G. Barnes in 1902 following the death of his first wife.

He was first elected to the Manitoba legislature in a by-election held on November 27, 1909. Malcolm was elected to replace former Liberal house leader Charles Mickle in the constituency of Birtle. During the election, he was endorsed by both the Liberal Party and the Manitoba Grain Growers' Association.

Malcolm was re-elected in the 1910 provincial election, defeating a Conservative candidate by 110 votes. He was again returned in the 1914 provincial election, by an increased margin.

The Conservative Party, which had governed Manitoba since 1900, was forced to resign from office in 1915 amid a serious corruption scandal. The Liberals won a landslide majority government in the 1915 provincial election, with Malcolm receiving more than twice as many votes as his Conservative opponent. He served as a backbench supporter of Norris's government for the next five years.

The Liberals were reduced to an unstable minority government in the election of 1920, and Malcolm was re-elected over his Farmer opponent by a reduced margin. On September 30, 1920, he was appointed as Minister of Agriculture in Norris' government. He held this position until resigning on June 6, 1922.

Malcolm did not run in the 1922 provincial election, which the Liberals lost to the United Farmers of Manitoba.

He died in Brandon at the age of 64.
