= Fred Tipping =

Canadian trade unionist (1885–1973)

- Born: Frederick George Tipping; 1885; Twickenham, England
- Died: 1973 (aged 87–88); Winnipeg, Manitoba, Canada
- Occupations: Trade unionist; schoolteacher; Baptist preacher; woodcarver
- Political party: Social Democratic Party of Canada; Dominion Labour Party; Co-operative Commonwealth Federation
- Spouse: Dora Segrid Eldon (m. 1914; died 1964)

Frederick George Tipping (1885–1973) was a labour organizer in Manitoba, Canada. He was involved in the Winnipeg general strike of 1919, and subsequently ran for office as a candidate of the Labour Party.

Tipping's personal beliefs were strongly influenced by the English socialist Robert Blatchford. He was a founder of the Social Democratic Party of Canada (SDP) in 1911, and was a prominent social democrat in Winnipeg's north end during the 1910s. Distinguishing the SDP from the more doctrinaire Socialist Party of Canada, he once wrote that "the doctrinal body is liable to use terminology that is peculiar to itself, [but] the language of the social democrat tended to be more the language of the street". Tipping was elected to the Winnipeg trades council during this period, and helped to form in the Dominion Labour Party in 1918.

Tipping holds the unique distinction of being the only teacher to participate in the Winnipeg general strike. He taught shop classes, and so was a member of the Winnipeg carpenter's union. When the strike was called, he believed it was his duty to support the workers. He was still paid by the Winnipeg School Board throughout the strike.

After the strike was suppressed, Tipping was arrested for addressing an open-air meeting in defiance of a Winnipeg by-law. He was released later when it was shown that the address had actually taken place in the neighbouring community of Fort Garry. Tipping was later sent by the Strike Committee to Ottawa, to petition the federal government for a jury trial for other strikers arrested on charges of seditious conspiracy.

In the 1920 provincial election, Tipping ran in the Winnipeg constituency as part of a "united labour" slate. At the time, Winnipeg elected ten members by a single transferable ballot. Although the labour slate did well overall, Tipping finished 36th on the first count and was eliminated on the sixteenth count.

He remained active with the labour movement and socialist parties after this period. He joined the Cooperative Commonwealth Federation (CCF), and ran for the party in the 1945 federal election in Winnipeg South. He received 9,033 votes, finishing a credible third behind Liberal Leslie Alexander Mutch. He ran again in the 1949 election, with the same result. Tipping was nominated for the CCF nomination again in the 1953 provincial election, but declined.
