= Arthur Moore (Manitoba politician) =

Canadian politician

Arthur Ernest Moore (February 12, 1882 – October 4, 1950) was an English-born politician in Manitoba, Canada. He served in the Legislative Assembly of Manitoba from 1920 to 1922 as a member of the Labour Party.

Moore was born in Lewisham, the son of Charles Frederick Moore and Martha Castle, and was educated at All Saints in Sydenham, in the southern suburbs of London, England. As a boy, he served in the Royal Navy. In 1904, he married Harriet Pink. Moore moved to Canada in 1910. He was a Signal Sergeant in the 44th Battalion of the C.E.F. in World War I, and was wounded twice. After the war, Moore served on a commission set up by the Manitoba government to investigate employment opportunities for veterans. After the work, he worked at the Fort Rouge yards of the Canadian National Railway.

He was elected to the Manitoba legislature in the 1920 provincial election for the constituency of Springfield, east of Winnipeg. Moore defeated Farmer candidate Isaac Cook by 59 votes, and served with the opposition Labour parliamentary group for the next two years.

It is not clear what role he played in the Labour Party's divisions of late 1920, though, in any event, he did not seek re-election in 1922.

Moore served as president of the Manitoba command of the Great War Veterans Association and then was chairman of the Canadian Legion from its formation in 1925 until his death in 1950.

In the 1927 provincial election, an "A.E. Moore" sought election in Winnipeg as an independent supporter of the pro-temperance "Moderation League". At the time, Winnipeg elected ten members via a single transferable ballot. Moore finished eighteenth on the first count, and was eliminated on the tenth. It is likely that this "A.E. Moore" was the former Member of the Legislative Assembly (MLA).

He died at Deer Lodge Military Hospital in Winnipeg at the age of 69.
