= John S. Ridley =

Canadian politician

Member of the Legislative Assembly of Manitoba for Manitou
- In office 1920–1922
- Preceded by: George Thomas Armstrong
- Succeeded by: George Compton

Personal details
- Born: April 6, 1882 Parkhill, Ontario, Canada
- Died: May 2, 1934 (aged 52) Manitou, Manitoba, Canada
- Party: Progressive Conservative Party of Manitoba
- Occupation: Farmer

John Sutherland Ridley (April 6, 1882 – May 2, 1934) was a politician in Manitoba, Canada. He served in the Legislative Assembly of Manitoba from 1920 to 1922. Ridley was a member of the Conservative Party.

== Biography ==
He was born in Parkhill, Ontario, the son of John W. Ridley and Elisabeth Boyd. Ridley was first employed in farming and later entered the farm implement business, partnering with his brother in Manitou. He played with the Manitou Lacrosse Club, who were provincial champions in 1904. He was a member of the United Church. Ridley married Sarah E. Kealey.

Ridley was elected to the Manitoba legislature in the 1920 provincial election, defeating Farmer candidate George Compton by 259 votes in the constituency of Manitou. Incumbent Liberal George Armstrong finished third. The Liberal Party won a minority government in this election, and Ridley served with his party in opposition.

He ran for re-election in the 1922 provincial election, and narrowly lost to George Compton in a rematch from two years earlier. Compton was by this time a candidate of the United Farmers of Manitoba.

His son Maurice also served in the Manitoba assembly.

He died in Manitou in 1934.
