= Albert Kristjansson =

Canadian politician (1877–1974)

Albert E. Kristjansson (April 17, 1877 – July 29, 1974) was a politician in Manitoba, Canada. He served in the Legislative Assembly of Manitoba from 1920 to 1922. During his political career, he was a resident of Lundar, Manitoba.

Born in Iceland, Kristjansson served as Unitarian minister for congregations in Gimli and Otto and Mary Hill, Manitoba. From 1914 to 1928, he was president of the United Conference of Icelandic Churches.

Kristjansson was elected to the Manitoba legislature in the 1920 provincial election as a Labour Party candidate, defeating Liberal incumbent Skuli Sigfusson by 117 votes in the constituency of St. George. The Liberal Party won a minority government in this election, and Kristjansson initially served with the Labour parliamentary group in opposition.

He subsequently left the Labour Party to sit with the Independent-Farmer legislative group, loosely aligned with the Progressive Party of Canada. He sought re-election as a candidate of the United Farmers of Manitoba in the 1922 campaign, and lost to Sigfusson by 652 votes. Kristjansson attempted to return to the legislature as a Progressive candidate in the 1927 election, but lost to Sigfusson again.

After 1928, he was minister for congregations in Seattle and Blaine, Washington. Kristjansson died in Blaine at the age of 97.
