= R.B. Russell Vocational High School =

R. B. Russell Vocational High School

Location
- 364 Dufferin Avenue; Winnipeg, Manitoba; Canada; 49.91092°N 97.14221°W

Information
- School type: Public, High School
- Founded: 1967; 59 years ago
- School board: Winnipeg School Division
- Principal: Paul Krowiak
- Grades: Grades 9-12
- Enrollment: 319
- Language: English

R. B. Russell Vocational High School is a grade 9 to 12 public high school in Winnipeg, Manitoba, Canada. It is located in the North End neighborhood, and is part of the Winnipeg School Division. On April 20, 2017, the school celebrated its 50th anniversary.

== History ==
R. B. Russell opened in 1967, and is named after labour organizer and politician Robert B. Russell. The design of the school was developed by a local Winnipeg firm named, Duncan Rattray Peters and Searle, which formulated a plan for the school to hold a capacity of 700 students.

== Programs ==
The Welding Technology Program at R. B. Russell is a four-year program where students practice a variety of welding techniques. Students who graduate will be eligible for the Canadian Welding Bureau certification. The program has a history of creating art with a focus of learning about Indigenous culture. In the past, students have designed projects honouring Missing and murdered Indigenous women and Tina Fontaine.

In 2022, a student from the schools welding program built a Winnipeg Blue Bombers fire pit with Adam Bighill's number on it, and was offered tickets to the season opener by Bighill in exchange for the fire pit.

== Notable alumni ==
- David Reimer
