= Peter Masniuk =

Canadian politician (1920–1995)

Peter Paul Masniuk (February 17, 1920 in Morweena, Manitoba – October 21, 1995) was a politician in Manitoba, Canada. He was a Progressive Conservative member of the Legislative Assembly of Manitoba from 1966 to 1969, and a federal Progressive Conservative member of the House of Commons of Canada from 1972 to 1979.

The son of Paul Masniuk and Anne Fediuk, Masniuk was educated at public school in Narcisse, Manitoba. He was a section foreman with the Canadian National Railway before entering politics, and was a Union contact at Lodge 308 from 1955 to 1966. He served in the armoured car division of the 12th Manitoba Dragoons from 1942 to 1945, and was later president of Branch No. 158 of the Royal Canadian Legion from 1960 to 1965. In 1947, Masniuk married Rose Kowalchuk.

He was elected to the Manitoba legislature in the 1966 provincial election in the riding of Fisher, defeating former NDP MLA Peter Wagner by 112 votes. He was not appointed to cabinet, and did not seek re-election in 1969 after the abolition of his riding. He was known for bringing a union perspective to the PC caucus.

He moved to federal politics in the 1972 Canadian election, and was elected for the riding of Portage, defeating his nearest opponent by more than 2,000 votes. He was returned in the 1974 election, but lost his seat to New Democratic Party challenger Terry Sargeant in the 1979 election, in the redistributed riding of Selkirk—Interlake. This loss occurred just as the Progressive Conservatives formed a minority government under the leadership of Joseph Clark.

Masniuk returned to his job as a CNR foreman after his defeat. He later served as reeve of Armstrong from 1985 to 1992, and was a housing officer with the Manitoba Housing Authority. He died suddenly while dancing at a community event in Arborg, celebrating fifty years of his contributions to the Legion.
