= Thomas Seens =

Canadian politician

Thomas Henry Seens (September 8, 1895 – November 26, 1989) was a politician in Manitoba, Canada. He served in the Legislative Assembly of Manitoba as a Progressive Conservative from 1949 to 1953.

The son of G. H. Seens and Jane Whittington, Seens born in 1895 in Bradwardine, Manitoba. He was educated in Tarbolton, Manitoba and worked in Manitoba as a farmer. He served as a councillor for sixteen years, and was a reeve from 1940 to 1950. Seens was also a member of the Masonic Lodge No. 115 in Rivers, Manitoba. In 1916, he married Annie Mae Wood.

He was elected to the Manitoba legislature in the 1949 provincial election, defeating Liberal-Progressive candidate Matthew R. Sutherland by forty votes in the Lansdowne constituency. The Liberal-Progressives and Progressive Conservatives were part of a coalition government in Manitoba at the time of this election, although candidates from these parties campaigned against one another in certain constituencies.

In 1950, the Progressive Conservatives left the coalition government. Seens did not initially support this decision, but eventually decided to sit with the Progressive Conservative caucus in opposition. He lost to Sutherland by over 400 votes in the 1953 provincial election, and did not run for the legislature again. He died in 1989 in Brandon, Manitoba.
