= Samuel Fletcher (politician) =

Canadian politician

Samuel Fletcher (died 1950) was a politician in Manitoba, Canada. He served in the Legislative Assembly of Manitoba representing the Killarney constituency from 1920 to 1922.

Fletcher worked as a farmer, and lived in Holmfield, Manitoba, where he served as a member of the West Derby School board. He was then elected to the Manitoba legislature in the 1920 provincial election, defeating Liberal incumbent Samuel M. Hayden by 396 votes. Fletcher was elected as a Farmer candidate, representing a movement that opposed the province's two-party system of Liberals and Conservatives.

He sat with the Independent-Farmer group in the legislature, and did not seek re-election in 1922.
