= Henry Mabb =

Canadian politician (1872–1960)

Personal details
- Born: Henry Liddell Mabb, Jr. January 24, 1872; Hull, Yorkshire, England
- Died: December 25, 1960 (aged 88)

Henry Liddell Mabb (January 24, 1872—December 25, 1960) was a politician, Mountie, and rancher who lived in Manitoba, Canada in the late 19th and early 20th century.

== Early life ==
He was born at Hull in Yorkshire, England. He was the son of Henry Liddell Mabb, Sr. and Ellen Holder, both of whom were born and raised in Yorkshire. Mabb was the oldest of 12 children.

Sometime in the late 19th century, his father relocated the family to Antwerp, Belgium. They settled among a community of British expatriates and were congregants at the Chapelle des Tanneurs, which had served as the place of worship for Anglicans (Church of England) in Antwerp since 1821. Several of Mabb's brothers and sisters were christened in the chapel. Henry received his secondary education at the Athénée Royal. He studied and reputedly mastered four languages while living in Belgium.

The Mabb family appears to have moved back to England, where brother Stanley Holder Mabb was born at Sutton in 1886. The family then moved to Canada in the spring of 1887, with Winnipeg as their ultimate destination. However, according to a 1911 census document, for some reason Henry indicates he immigrated to Canada in 1890. Other family testimonials suggest the senior Mabb family might have made its way into Canada and specifically Manitoba from the United States, but there is no documentation to support this.

== Career ==
Young Henry served the Government of Canada as a constable in the North-West Mounted Police (N.W.M.P.) from 1890 to 1895. Engaging in 300-mile (480 km) treks over the prairies, Mabb's mastery of languages permitted him to develop fluency in Cree and Sioux. Some newspaper accounts suggest Mabb was involved as a translator in talks between representatives of the Crown and the Lakota leader Sitting Bull. Mabb was fully engaged in service for five years until he was discharged with honours in 1895. In addition to working the land as a rancher, Mabb was also employed by the Crown as a homestead inspector in northern Manitoba, between the lakes.

During his political career, he lived in Fisher Branch, Manitoba. He was elected to the Manitoba legislature in the 1920 provincial election, defeating two Liberal candidates in the constituency of Fisher. Mabb was elected as an "independent Farmer" candidate, and served with the opposition Independent-Farmer bloc for the next two years. He served in the Legislative Assembly of Manitoba from 1920 to 1922. Unlike others in the Independent-Farmer bloc, Mabb did not run for the United Farmers of Manitoba in the 1922 provincial election. Nicholas Bachynsky received the UFM nomination, while Mabb ran for re-election as an independent candidate. Bachynsky won by 327 votes. Mabb later joined the Conservative Party, and challenged Bachynsky again in the 1927 election. He lost by 444 votes.

== Personal life ==
Mabb married twice, first to Bertha May Mullett (1872—1904), and then, in 1905, to Clara Bird. He was honoured by the RCMP Veteran's Association in 1955, marking the 60th anniversary of his discharge from the N.W.M.P. He died in 1961.
