= William Ivens =

Canadian politician (1878–1957)

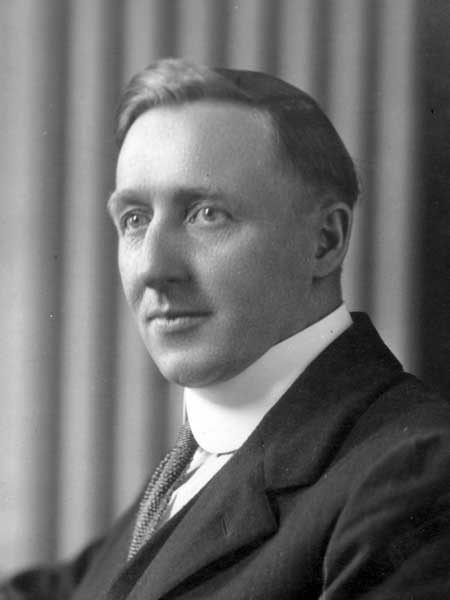
- Ivens in 1921

Member of the Manitoba Legislative Assembly for Winnipeg
- In office 1920–1936

Personal details
- Born: June 28, 1878 Barford, Warwickshire, England
- Died: June 20, 1957 (aged 78) Chula Vista, California, U.S.
- Resting place: Elmwood Cemetery, Winnipeg, Manitoba
- Party: Dominion Labour Party
- Other political affiliations: Independent Labour Party of Manitoba
- Spouse: Louisa Davis (m. 1908)
- Children: 4
- Education: University of Manitoba
- Profession: Minister

William Ivens (June 28, 1878 – June 20, 1957) was a religious and political figure in Manitoba, Canada. He was a leading figure in the Winnipeg General Strike, and subsequently served as a Labour member of the Manitoba legislature from 1920 to 1936.

== Early life ==
William Ivens was born in 1878 at Barford, in Warwickshire, England, to William Henry Ivens and Sarah Willis. He was the second eldest of seven siblings and was from a family who were actively involved in the local community.

William emigrated to Canada in 1896 and initially found work as a farm labourer and gardener in rural Manitoba. He was educated at Wesley College, Winnipeg and was greatly influenced by Reverend Salem Bland. He wrote for the school newspaper Vox Wesleyana and a poem published in a 1906 edition demonstrates his early and emerging political views. Titled ‘the Three Voices’, it was concerned with unproductive, hedonistic and materialistic lifestyles. William graduated from Wesley College in 1906 with a Bachelor of Arts, then in 1907 with a Bachelor of Divinity.

He then attended the University of Manitoba in 1909, gaining a Master of Arts degree in political economy with his thesis on the topic of Canadian Immigration.

In the summer holidays between his academic years he travelled to the Little Grand Rapids settlement on the shore of Lake Winnipeg and worked as a missionary.

On July 7, 1908, William Ivens and Louisa Davis wed. On 27 January 1910, their first son Milton Herbert Ivens was born. A daughter Eva Maude Ivens was born on 4 July 1913 at Pipestone, Manitoba and died a few months later on 18 September 1913. Another son John Boyden Ivens was born in 1915 at Brandon, Manitoba and died in 1921. Their last child Lewis William Ivens was born in 1918 and died in 1920.

== Career ==
=== Ministerial career ===
Ivens began his ministerial career at a time when the social gospel was on the rise in Canada. From 1908 to 1916 William served as a minister at several rural posts in Manitoba, at Selkirk, Makinak, Ochre River, Pipestone and Brandon. He continued writing throughout this period, for example, in 1912 he submitted a letter to Winnipeg's labour paper, the Voice, titled ‘The Prince of Peace, a Protest against Militarism and Barbarism’ which outlined his objections to military spending in the 1911 naval budget. He also wrote for the paper in 1916 about the concept of the Parliament of Man and in 1917 about Balkan nationalism.

William was stationed at the McDougall Methodist Church in Winnipeg in 1916, and called for the church to lead the labour movement in its struggle against the prevailing tendencies of North American capitalism. In 1917 and 1918, Ivens was opposed by several members of his congregation by defending conscientious objectors to World War I and criticizing the management of the war. He expressed these opinions as a private citizen in newspaper articles, rather than from his pulpit; nevertheless, many church members opposed him as insufficiently patriotic in wartime.

Although there were several petitions presented in Ivens' favour (he had improved the financial status of McDougall during his time as its minister), the overseeing body removed him from the church in June 1918 in an effort to restore local unity. Ivens agreed to stand down on condition that he be granted a year's leave to establish a "workers' church". Before the end of the month, he had founded the first Labour Church in the City of Winnipeg.

=== Labour Church Leader ===
June 30, 1918 marked the start of the Labour church as soon to be members gathered at the Winnipeg Labor Temple to discuss the possibility of a church for workers, pro-labour progressives and disgruntled church members. This church was created to preach information relevant to the working class. The Labour church held meetings on Sunday evenings and rapidly grew in popularity, attracting over 4,000 mostly working class parishioners in just six months. In January 1919, the Church opened the pulpit to women.

Ivens was directly involved in labour activism during this period. He was employed as an organiser for the Dominion Labour Party, and attempted to build local networks of support in a speaking tour of western Canada. Upon his return to Winnipeg, he assumed the editorship of the Western Labour News, a newspaper published by the Winnipeg Trades and Labour Council.

==== Participation in the Winnipeg General Strike ====
In May 1919 the Western Labour News reported that a general strike in Winnipeg seemed ‘inevitable’ as there was widespread anger about the working and living conditions endured by inhabitants of the city. When the Winnipeg General Strike of 1919 was called, Ivens continued as editor of the Western Labour News and published a Daily Strike Bulletin to provide information to striking workers. He wrote numerous articles in support of the strikers.

The Citizens’ Committee of One Thousand also created their own paper during the strike, the Winnipeg Citizen, advertising itself as being printed to keep the inhabitants who weren't involved in the Strike informed. It printed articles which referred to William and four other key figures of the labour movement as ‘the red five’ or ‘anarchists.’ William himself wrote that the Winnipeg Citizen published ‘vile and pernicious propaganda’ and joked that they thought he was a Russian spy called ‘Ivens the Terrible.’

Reverend Ivens preached services of his church for the six weeks of the strike with an estimated 171 sermons. Within these services strike news would be relayed along with the prayers. Although he warned against public disorder, he also referred to the strike as the harbinger of a new age for the working-class in Canada. He preached that change should come from the peaceful withdrawal of labour, protest and at the ballot box. His Labour Church soon became the scene of extremely large meetings, with crowds almost doubling to 7,000 listeners.

During the strike, William was also an active in committees organising food supplies and in issuing cards to workers who were unable to go on strike due to providing essential services (such as delivering bread and milk to families with young children).

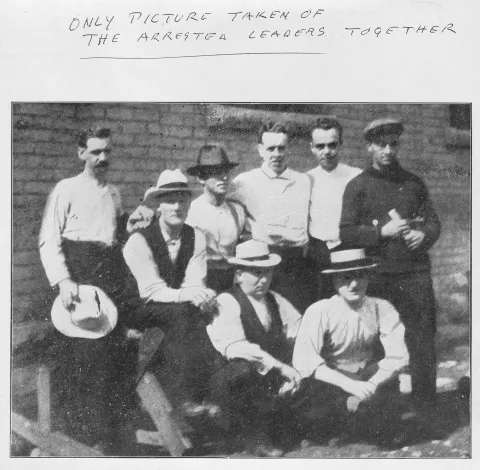
Back row: Roger Ernest Bray, George Armstrong, John Queen, Robert Boyd Russell, Richard James Johns and Bill Pritchard. Front row: Reverend William Ivens and Abraham Albert Heaps.

When the Canadian government suppressed the strike in June 1919, Ivens was arrested on charges of seditious libel and conspiracy at 2am during an overnight raid on the 17th of June. Other leaders were arrested alongside William, with most of the key figures of the strike committee imprisoned. The day after William's arrest, his devastated wife Louisa addressed crowds of striking workers at the Labour Temple. James Shaver Woodsworth, another Methodist minister and labour activist, took over Iven's positions following the arrest.

There were numerous protests against the arrests William and the other strike leaders, and crowds gathered to hear William preach from behind bars on Sundays. To calm the public mood and reduce gatherings, William and the other imprisoned strike leaders were transferred to Birch River prison farm, until they would come to trial. This prison was 75 miles away from Winnipeg and could only be accessed by train.

William made a four-hour address to the jury at his trial and used the occasion to publicise and justify his views. Although it is unlikely that his editorials constituted sedition by the standards of the age, on 28 March 1920, he was found guilty and given a year in prison. He was also charged with contempt of court for comments he had made about the trial of the Metal Workers Union president Robert Boyd Russell, who was found guilty of ‘seditious conspiracy’ in 1919. William is reported to have said that: ‘In the sight of the judge and jury Russell was condemned as a guilty man, but in the sight of Almighty God he is innocent.’

Ivens was sent to Stony Mountain Penitentiary.

=== Political career ===
While still in prison, Ivens ran as a candidate of the Dominion Labour Party (DLP) in the provincial election of 1920, and was successfully elected in the city of Winnipeg. Winnipeg, at the time, elected ten members by preferential balloting; Ivens finished fifth on the first count and was declared elected on the second after receiving transfers from DLP leader Fred Dixon.

William was released on bail from prison on 29 February 1921, to cheering crowds of supporters, and by 4 March 1921 he was already in the Legislature taking part in debates. In 1926 he argued against capital punishment and in 1928 he supported a bill to introduce old age pensions.

In late 1920, the DLP split into two factions via a fallout over the Winnipeg General Strike. Dixon, Ivens, Woodsworth and most others on the left of the DLP founded the new Independent Labour Party of Manitoba (ILP) in November 1920. William was re-elected in the provincial election of 1922, but was reduced to fourth place among the successful social democratic candidates and was not assured of re-election until the final count.

Ivens was re-elected in the elections of 1927 and 1932, though again behind other successful social democratic candidates. He lost his seat in the provincial election of 1936. In 1940, Ivens ran unsuccessfully as an Ontario Cooperative Commonwealth Federation (CCF) candidate in the federal Kenora—Rainy River riding. He attempted a comeback in the election of 1941 as a candidate of the Manitoba Cooperative Commonwealth Federation, but was unsuccessful. Ivens remained active in the CCF after leaving the legislature but never held a seat.

By the late 1920s, attendance at the Canadian Labour Churches has dwindled significantly and it was eventually superseded by a weekly Labour forum. William was a frequent guest speaker there. He published numerous pamphlets in the 1930s and 1940s on a wide variety of topics from the dangers of European fascism to concerns about local working conditions.

In addition to his political and religious careers, Ivens also received a chiropractor's certificate from the Manitoba School of Chiropractic in 1925 and practiced in the field. He contributed numerous articles to The Chiropractor journal over the years, covering health, social and political topics. William's son Milton Henry Ivens also entered the medical profession as he emigrated to the United States and qualified as a physician.

== Death and legacy ==
He died on June 20, 1957 at the home of his son Dr Milton Herbert Ivens in Chula Vista, California, at the age of 78. His body was repatriated to Canada and he was interred in Elmwood Cemetery in Winnipeg, on 12 July 1957.

He preached within his Labour Church, supported strikers and worked as a politician to make change.
