= Maurice Duprey =

Canadian politician

Member of the Legislative Assembly of Manitoba for Carillon
- In office June 29, 1920 – July 18, 1922
- Preceded by: Albert Prefontaine
- Succeeded by: Albert Prefontaine

Personal details
- Born: March 31, 1873 Lowell, Massachusetts, U.S.
- Died: October 7, 1945 (aged 72) Ste Elizabeth, Manitoba, Canada
- Spouse: Mary Longtin
- Children: 6
- Occupation: Farmer, politician

Maurice Duprey was a politician in Manitoba, Canada. He served in the Legislative Assembly of Manitoba from 1920 to 1922.

Duprey lived in St. Elizabeth, Manitoba, where he worked as a farmer. He was elected to the legislature in the 1920 provincial election the rural constituency of Carillon. Running as a Farmer candidate, he defeated Conservative incumbent Albert Prefontaine by 48 votes.

A number of "Farmer" and "Independent Farmer" candidates were elected to the Manitoba legislature in 1920, reflecting the growth of agrarian radicalism in the province. Duprey sat with this group in the legislature for the next two years, serving as an opposition member.

Many of the Farmer MLAs from 1920 later joined the United Farmers of Manitoba (UFM), which formed government after winning a majority of seats in the 1922 provincial election. Duprey was not part of this group. The Carillon UFM nomination was won by Albert Prefontaine, who had previously left the Conservative Party. Duprey ran for re-election as an independent Farmer candidate, and lost to Prefontaine by 316 votes.

Duprey himself later joined the Conservative Party, and ran against Prefontaine as a Conservative in the 1932 campaign. He lost by 1,786 votes.
