= Henry Robson Richardson =

Canadian politician (1879-1966)

Henry Robson Richardson (1879 – October 28, 1966) was a politician in Manitoba, Canada. He served in the Legislative Assembly of Manitoba from 1920 to 1922. During his political career, he lived in Roblin, Manitoba.

Born in Newcastle-upon-Tyne, England, Richardson came to Canada in 1879 and settled in the Cartwright area. He served in the British Army during the Boer War in 1900, returning to Canada the following year. After operating a hardware business for several years, Richardson settled in the Roblin area. He served with the First Canadian Mounted Rifle during World War I. Richardson was elected to the Manitoba legislature in the 1920 provincial election, defeating Conservative Frederic Newton by 104 votes in the Roblin constituency. He was elected as a Farmer candidate, representing voters who opposed the old two-party system of Liberals and Conservatives. For the next two years, he served in the legislative opposition as a member of the Independent-Farmer group.

He ran for re-election in the 1922 campaign, and lost to Newton by only nine votes.

Richardson died in Edmonton, Alberta.
