= Edward Dickson (Canadian politician) =

Canadian politician

Edward Dickson (1854–1903) was a merchant and political figure in Manitoba. He represented Lansdowne from 1888 to 1896 in the Legislative Assembly of Manitoba as a Liberal.

The son of Thomas Dickson, a resident of Russell Township, Canada West, he worked in the lumber trade in Ontario before coming west to Winnipeg in 1881 as a bookkeeper for the Canadian Pacific Railway. Dickson operated a supply store in Oak Lake. He also served as a justice of the peace, as county clerk and as the first reeve for the Rural Municipality of Sifton. In 1890, he married Emma May Horsman.

Dickson along with James Henry Ashdown formed the Robin Hood Powder Company with a view to marketing Dickson's smokeless gun powder through Ashdown's hardware store in Winnipeg. The Robin Hood Powder Co. became one of many companies to make smokeless powder during the late 1800s and early 1900s. These companies formed a competitive industry aimed at producing the best cartridges for the growing fire arms market. The start date of the Company is often cited as 1896; however, on September 10, 1895, an explosion destroyed the Winnipeg mill. In 1895, the mill was likely still experimenting with producing a "progressive burning" smokeless gun powder, a powder that burns grain by grain rather than all at once as with black powder. The explosion completely destroyed the building, the machinery, 1,500 to 2,000 made-up cartridges, 5,000 shells, and 100 pounds of powder, plus the 5 to 6 pounds that initially ignited. Two men died: Englishman John Longstaffe Morris and Ontario-born Murray Laidlaw, who later succumbed to his injuries. Following the explosion, the Robin Hood Powder mill was rebuilt with changes to improve safety and relocated to a different part of Winnipeg. Over its history the Company was reorganized several times. Dickson went on to establish the Robin Hood Arms Factory, which was later bought by Remington, in Swanton, Vermont. Dickson died in Swanton in 1903.
