= Genevieve Lipsett =

Canadian journalist, teacher and suffragist (1885–1935)

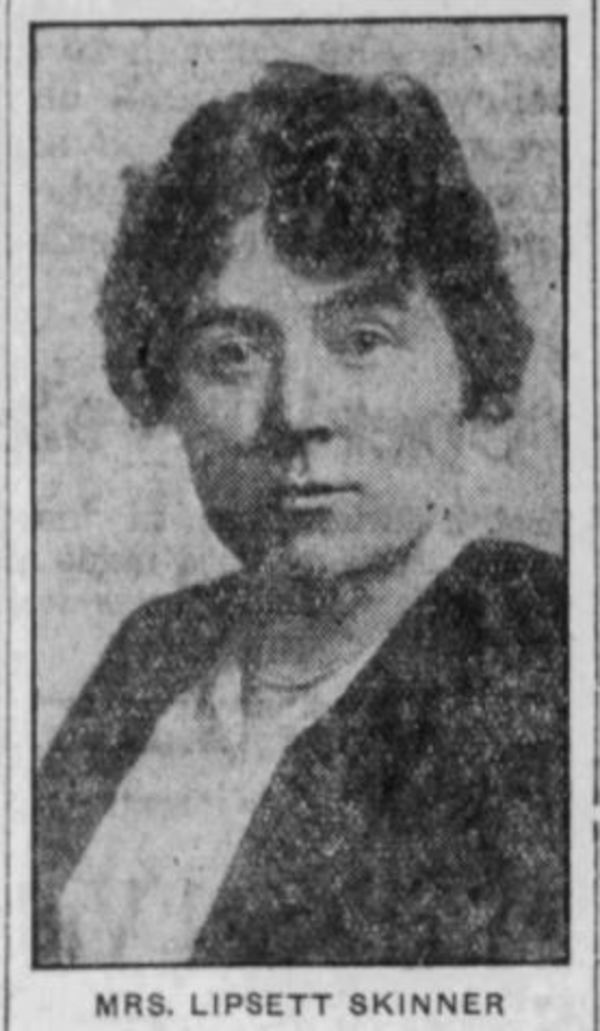
- Born: 29 July 1885; Kankakee, Illinois, United States
- Died: 29 January 1935 (aged 49); Montreal, Quebec, Canada
- Other name: Genevieve Lipsett-Skinner
- Education: New York Grammar School
- Alma mater: New York Normal College; University of Manitoba
- Occupations: Journalist, teacher and suffragist
- Employer(s): Winnipeg Telegram; The Montreal Star; Calgary Daily Herald; Vancouver Sun
- Organization(s): Manitoba Political Equality League; Canadian Women's Press Club; Canadian Parliamentary Press Gallery
- Spouse: Robert Curtis Skinner (m. 1911, div. 1919)

Genevieve Elsie Alice Lipsett (29 July 1885 – 29 January 1935) was an American-born Canadian journalist, teacher and suffragist. She was the first woman to became a member of the Canadian Parliamentary Press Gallery (French: Tribune de la presse parlementaire), the association established to oversee rules and responsibilities of Canadian journalists when at Parliament Hill. After her marriage, she wrote under the byline "Genevieve Lipsett-Skinner."

== Biography ==
Lipsett was born on 29 July 1885 in Kankakee, Illinois, United States. Her parents were Robert and Annie Lipsett (née Macdonald). After her family moved to Canada, Lipsett was educated at public schools in Toronto and Manitoba, then at New York Grammar School. She attended the New York Normal College from 1900 to 1903 and worked briefly as a teacher in a rural school in Manitoba.

Lipsett moved to Winnipeg, Manitoba, Canada, in 1904, where she worked for the Winnipeg Telegram from 1914 as a reporter and editor of the paper's "Sunshine" department. On 6 June 1911, Lipsett married Winnipeg businessman Robert Curtis Skinner, but retained her maiden name in her new byline of "Genevieve Lipsett-Skinner."

In 1912, Lipsett was engaged in delivering talks in Britain and Ireland to promote the emigration of women to "the Dominion" (an historic title for Canada). After returning to Canada, she was a founder member of the Manitoba Political Equality League, which lobbied for women's suffrage at the provincial level. In 1913, she reported on infant mortality for the Winnipeg Telegram, where she continued to work until 1920.

In 1918, Lipsett became the first married Canadian woman to qualify for a law degree from the University of Manitoba, completing her examinations in 1920 and graduating with honours.

In 1919, Lipsett's marriage ended and she moved to Ottawa to live with her brother and became a political journalist. Lipsett wrote for The Montreal Star and Calgary Daily Herald. From 1922 to 1923, she wrote for the Vancouver Sun. Women were barred from the all-male Canadian Press Club, so Lipsett became a member of the Canadian Women's Press Club, later becoming president of the Winnipeg then Montreal branches of the club. Lipsett was also director of the Anti-Tuberculosis Society and president of the Children's Aid Society of Toronto.

Lipsett was the first woman to became an officially accredited member of the Canadian Parliamentary Press Gallery (French: Tribune de la presse parlementaire), the association established to oversee rules and responsibilities of Canadian journalists when at Parliament Hill. She joined in 1923 and left the Press Gallery in 1926. From 1926 until her death Lipsett worked as The Montreal Star's Ottawa correspondent.

Lipsett died on 29 January 1935 in Montreal, Quebec, Canada, aged 49.
