= George Armstrong (Manitoba politician) =

Canadian socialist

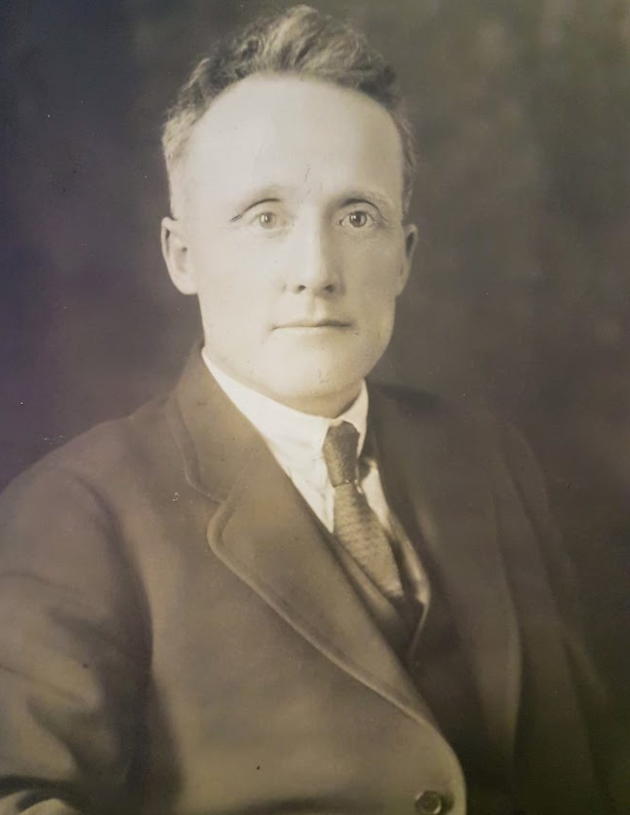
- Armstrong in 1921

Member of the Legislative Assembly of Manitoba
- In office 1921–1922
- Constituency: Winnipeg

Personal details
- Born: April 17, 1870 East York, Ontario, Canada
- Died: February 13, 1956 (aged 85) Concord, California, United States
- Party: Socialist Party of Canada
- Spouse: Helen
- Occupation: labour organizer, politician

George Armstrong (April 17, 1870 – February 13, 1956) was a politician and labour activist in Manitoba, Canada. He served in the Legislative Assembly of Manitoba from 1920 to 1922, and is notable as the only member of the Socialist Party of Canada ever to serve in that institution.

== History ==
Armstrong was born in East York, Ontario, and educated in Ellesmere. He trained as a carpenter, and practiced his trade in Winnipeg. Armstrong was a member of the Fair Wage Board for Manitoba.

He first ran for the Manitoba legislature in the 1910 provincial election, in the constituency of Winnipeg West. At the time, the Socialist Party represented the left wing of the labour movement in Manitoba, with the reformist Manitoba Labour Party (MLP) representing its moderate voice. Armstrong was known in this period as a leading figure in the SPC's "impossibilist" wing, opposing any cooperation with moderate labour. In electoral terms, the Socialist Party was a marginal force in the city. Armstrong received 246 votes in Winnipeg West, against 2,578 for the victorious candidate, Liberal Thomas Johnson.

In the 1914 provincial election, Armstrong ran in Winnipeg Centre "B" against Fred Dixon, an independent candidate supported by both the Liberals and the Labour Representation Committee, a successor to the MLP. A Conservative candidate also contested the seat. Armstrong and his supporters disrupted Dixon's rallies throughout the campaign, accusing him of being a "fake" in his advocacy of working-class causes. Dixon's supporters, in turn, argued that the SPC was receiving help from the Conservatives to split the labour vote. Armstrong finished a distant third with 928 votes, while Dixon received 8,205 votes for a convincing victory.

Armstrong ran against Dixon again in the 1915 election, and again lost by a significant margin.

== Winnipeg General Strike ==
The Winnipeg General Strike of 1919 brought Armstrong and the SPC into cooperation with the city's labour movement. Along with other prominent labour organizers in the city, Armstrong was brought to trial after the strike's suppression on charges of seditious conspiracy. He was convicted, and spent almost two years in prison with fellow strikers such as William Ivens and John Queen. Many observers at the time, and many since, have regarded the charges against the strikers as unjust and politically motivated.

Even as the Socialist Party was declining in the rest of the country, the spirit of labour unity generated by the strike and the arrests brought the SPC in Winnipeg into a temporary alliance with the city's other labour parties. Armstrong, previously an opponent of "popular front" strategies, became the SPC's star candidate on Winnipeg's united labour list for the 1920 provincial election.

== Election ==
For this election, following a change in the province's electoral laws, Winnipeg became a city-wide constituency that elected ten members to the legislature by single transferable vote (STV). Labour and the SPC joined with two other parties for a slate of ten candidates, and ran a united campaign. Armstrong, still serving his prison sentence, finished third on the first count and was declared elected to the city's eighth position on the final count. He served in the legislature with the labour group under F. J. Dixon's leadership. Despite their philosophical differences, Dixon and Armstrong were able to cooperate with one another in this period.

The Socialist Party of Canada split in 1921, with many of its members joining the newly formed Communist Party. Armstrong remained a member of the SPC, even though the party was having difficulty maintaining a national presence by this time. During the 1922 provincial election, Armstrong was frequently heckled by Communist candidates who accused him of being a "sell out" to the social gospellers in the mainstream labour movement. He finished ninth on the first count, but fell behind on transfers and failed to win a seat. The SPC ceased to exist a few years later, and Armstrong withdrew from provincial politics for a time.

== Socialist Party of Canada (WSM) ==
Armstrong ran for the Manitoba legislature again in the 1932 provincial election as the candidate of the Socialist Party of Canada (WSM). He was unsuccessful, finishing nineteenth on the first count and being eliminated on the tenth.

Armstrong was also a popular figure in his carpenter's union, even though his views were to left most other members. In his later years, he relocated from Manitoba to California.
