= William Findlater (Manitoba politician) =

Canadian politician

William Blain Findlater (October 20, 1871—March 26, 1962) was a politician in Manitoba, Canada. He served in the Legislative Assembly of Manitoba from 1915 to 1922. Findlater was a member of the Liberal Party.

Findlater was born at Belmore, in Huron County, Ontario, the son of Alexander Findlater and Mary Pipe, and was educated at public schools in the region. He later moved to Manitoba, and worked as a farmer and driver. In 1905, he married Mary Dickie.

He was first elected to the Manitoba legislature in the 1915 provincial election, defeating Conservative incumbent Sam Hughes by 591 votes in the constituency of Gilbert Plains. The Liberals won a landslide majority in this election, and Findlater sat as a backbench supporter of Tobias Norris's government.

The Liberals were reduced to a minority government in the 1920 provincial election. Findlater was re-elected, defeating independent candidate R.J. Dalgleish by twenty votes. He did not seek re-election in 1922.

Findlater died in Dauphin at the age of 90.
