= Farmer (party) =

In the 1920 Manitoba general election, a heterogenous grouping of "Farmer" candidates took 12 seats. Together they made up the second-largest caucus in the Legislature. Some of them went on to found the United Farmers of Manitoba in 1922.

In the 1930 federal election in Canada, five supporters of the United Farmers ran in Saskatchewan as "Farmer" candidates. None of them were elected. Additionally, in the 1925 federal election, one supporter of the Progressive Party of Canada ran in Quebec as a "Farmer" candidate.

== See also ==
- List of political parties in Canada
