= Harvey Hicks =

Canadian politician

Harvey Elgin Hicks (June 2, 1865 – February 17, 1940) was a physician and political figure in Manitoba. He represented Lansdowne from 1903 to 1907 in the Legislative Assembly of Manitoba as a Conservative.

== Background ==
Born in Milford, Prince Edward County, Canada West, Hicks came to Manitoba in 1891 and studied at Manitoba Medical College. While pursuing his studies there, he also taught school near Griswold, Manitoba. He graduated in 1897 and set up practice in Griswold. Hicks was defeated by Tobias Norris when he ran for reelection to the Manitoba assembly in 1907.

== Britain ==
After his term in the assembly, Hicks did post-graduate work in Britain. In 1910, he joined the staff of the Brandon Mental Hospital and, in 1915, he became superintendent for the facility. Despite his age, he was allowed to serve in the Canadian Armed Forces near the end of World War I. After the war, Hicks returned to practice in Griswold until his retirement in 1926. He ran again unsuccessfully for the Lansdowne seat in 1920 and again in a 1928 by-election, and in Rockwood in 1922.

== Hicks's Passing ==
Hicks died at home in Griswold and was buried in Brandon.
