= Nicholas Bachynsky (politician) =

Canadian politician (1887–1969)

17th Speaker of the Legislative Assembly of Manitoba
- In office November 7, 1950 – October 23, 1958
- Preceded by: Wallace C. Miller
- Succeeded by: Abram Harrison

Member of the Legislative Assembly of Manitoba for Fisher
- In office July 18, 1922 – June 16, 1958
- Preceded by: Henry Mabb
- Succeeded by: Peter Wagner

Personal details
- Born: September 16, 1887 Eastern Galicia
- Died: August 14, 1969 (aged 81) Poplarfield, Manitoba
- Party: United Farmers of Manitoba 1922-1927; Conservative 1927-1958
- Occupation: Teacher

Nicholas Volodymir (Val) Bachynsky (September 16, 1887 in Eastern Galicia – August 14, 1969) was a politician in Manitoba, Canada. He served in the Legislative Assembly of Manitoba from 1922 to 1958, and was Speaker of the Assembly for most of Douglas Campbell's administration.

Bachynsky came to Canada in 1904 and to Manitoba in 1909. He was educated in Galicia. Bachynsky attended teacher's college in Brandon and worked as a teacher before entering politics. In 1920, he married Julia Wlasinuk.

He was first elected to the Manitoba legislature in the 1922 provincial election. Campaigning as a member of the United Farmers of Manitoba, he defeated the incumbent member, independent Henry L. Mabb, by a margin of 581 votes to 354 in the constituency of Fisher. After the election, the UFM formed government as the Progressive Party, and Bachynsky became a backbench supporter of John Bracken's administration.

Bachynsky again defeated Mabb, who was by this time identifying himself as a Conservative, in the 1927 election. He was again returned with comfortable margins in the elections of 1932 and 1936, now identifying himself as a Liberal-Progressive after an alliance between the province's Liberal and Progressive parties.

Bachnysky faced a more difficult challenge in the 1941 election, defeating pro-government independent L.W. Michalchuk by just thirty-three votes. He again defeated Michalchuk, then a CCF candidate, in the 1945 election by 121 votes.

Bachynsky was returned without difficulty in the elections of 1949 and 1953. After serving twenty-eight years as a backbencher, he was appointed Speaker of Legislature by Premier Douglas Campbell on November 7, 1950.

Bachynsky had difficulty concealing his dislike of the CCF backbench, and once expressed his sympathy to CCF leader Seymour Farmer for putting up with this "bunch of wild broncos". Lloyd Stinson, who became leader of the Manitoba CCF in 1952, claimed Bachynsky was "such a volatile, vociferous orator that he was temperamentally unsuited to be an impartial moderator". Stinson also claims that Bachynsky consistently ruled against the CCF on procedural matters after becoming speaker.

After thirty-six years in the legislature, Bachynsky lost the Fisher constituency by 56 votes to CCF candidate Peter Wagner in the 1958 provincial election.

He died on his farm in Poplarfield in 1969.
