= Fisher (electoral district) =

Defunct provincial electoral district in Manitoba, Canada

Fisher is a former provincial electoral district in Manitoba, Canada. It was created for the 1920 provincial election, and eliminated with the 1969 election. The constituency was located in mid-northern Manitoba, in the Interlake region.

There have long been suggestions that the election results for Fisher in the 1962 provincial election were rigged. New Democratic Party incumbent Peter Wagner was originally declared the winner, but this decision was overturned when a scrutineer from a remote polling station announced, by telephone, that a miscount had occurred.

== Members of the Legislative Assembly ==
Name	Party	Took office	Left office
Henry Mabb	Independent Farmer	1920	1922
Nicholas Bachynsky	Progressive	1922	1932
Nicholas Bachynsky	Liberal–Progressive	1932	1958
Peter Wagner	Cooperative Commonwealth Federation	1958	1961
	New Democratic Party	1961	1962
Emil Moeller	Progressive Conservative	1962	1966
Peter Masniuk	Progressive Conservative	1966	1969

== See also ==
- List of Manitoba provincial electoral districts
- Canadian provincial electoral districts
