= St. George (Manitoba provincial electoral district) =

Defunct provincial electoral district in Manitoba, Canada

St. George is a former provincial electoral district in Manitoba, Canada. It was established for the 1914 provincial election, and eliminated with the 1981 election.

The constituency housed a large Icelandic population. For most of its history, it was safe for the Liberal and Liberal-Progressive parties.

== Members of the Legislative Assembly ==
Name	Party	Took office	Left office
Edmund L. Taylor	Conservative	1914	1915
Skuli Sigfusson	Liberal	1915	1920
Albert Kristjansson	Labour	1920	1921
Albert Kristjansson	Independent-Farmer	1921	1922
Skuli Sigfusson	Liberal	1922	1932
Skuli Sigfusson	Liberal–Progressive	1932	1936
Salome Halldorson	Social Credit	1936	1941
Skuli Sigfusson	Liberal–Progressive	1941	1945
Christian Halldorson	Liberal–Progressive	1945	1956
Elman Guttormson	Liberal–Progressive	1956	1961
Elman Guttormson	Liberal	1961	1969
Bill Uruski	New Democratic Party	1969	1981

== See also ==
- List of Manitoba provincial electoral districts
- Canadian provincial electoral districts
