= Socialist Party of Canada (Manitoba) =

Former Canadian political party

The Socialist Party of Manitoba (SPM) was a short-lived social democratic political party launched in 1902 in the Canadian province of Manitoba. The organisation advanced a moderate programme of social reform legislation. In 1904 the SPM became one of the constituent units founding the Socialist Party of Canada, an organisation which continued until 1925.

== Establishment ==
The Socialist Party of Manitoba was established in 1902. Although professing a long-term objective of "socialisation of the means of Production, Distribution, and Exchange," in practice it followed the Fabian agenda of slow, incremental social legislation — a modest programme characterised by one historian as "pure reformist labourism." In one Winnipeg city election the SPM's candidate ran for office as a self-professed 'Labour Candidate' without so much as mentioning the word 'socialism' during the duration of the campaign.

Included among the planks of the SPM's ameliorative reform programme were demands for universal suffrage, direct legislation, abolition of standing armies, implementation of the 8-hour day, establishment of old age pensions, and implementation of compulsory public education.

Located in a largely rural province, the SPM had a small membership almost entirely contained in the city of Winnipeg.

== Socialist Party of Canada in Manitoba ==
The Socialist Party of Canada was a revolutionary Marxist organization, founded in 1904 as a merger of the Socialist Party of British Columbia and related groups in Manitoba and Ontario, Canada. Although strongest in British Columbia, the SPC was also a credible force in Winnipeg. One member of the party was elected to the Manitoba legislature in the 1920 provincial election.

During its early years, the Winnipeg SPC was a rival to larger reformist groups such as Arthur Puttee's Winnipeg Labour Party, from which many Socialists members had split. It was active in the local trade unions, and participated in the city's elections.

The party ran John Donald Houston in Winnipeg for the federal election of 1908. He finished third, behind the Liberal and Conservative candidates.

In the 1910 provincial election, the SPC ran candidates in three of Winnipeg's four ridings. They finished a distant third in all three, but may have been responsible for the defeat of reformist Manitoba Labour Party candidate Fred Dixon in Winnipeg Centre. Dixon's loss provoked a backlash against the SPC from Winnipeg's labour unions, weakening the party. Many of its members joined the newly formed Social Democratic Party of Canada, which became stronger in Winnipeg than any other city in western Canada.

In the 1914 provincial election, the SPC ran George Armstrong and Bill Hoop for the two Winnipeg Centre seats, but did not challenge the SDP in Winnipeg North. Both SPC candidates finished a distant third in their ridings. Armstrong ran against Dixon, but could not prevent his election as an independent.

The SPC was further marginalized in the 1915 provincial election. Its only candidate was Armstrong, who again placed third against Dixon. Subsequent events, however, would briefly revive the party's fortunes in the city.

In 1919, the city of Winnipeg was shaken by a General Strike which pitted unionized and non-unionized workers against the city's employers. The strike was suppressed by force, but labour radicalism within the city was greatly increased. There were increased calls for labour unity in the city. For the 1920 provincial election, the SPC, SDP and reformist labour parties forged an electoral alliance to contest Winnipeg's ten seats (which were determined by a single transferable ballot). The labour list received more votes than any other party, and elected four candidates to the Legislature. Armstrong was elected, along with three candidates from the other parties.

The 1920 election proved to be the party's greatest success in Manitoba. In 1921, the SPC lost many of its members to the newly formed Workers Party (which was the legal wing of the Communist Party of Canada) and ceased to function as a viable organization. Armstrong ran again as an SPC candidate in the 1922 election, and was frequently heckled by Workers Party candidates for his alliance with the reformist Independent Labour Party. Armstrong was defeated, and the party formally dissolved in 1925.

== Recreated Socialist Party of Canada ==
Armstrong resurfaced as an SPC candidate in the 1932 provincial election, but fared poorly. The party does not appear to have functioned in the city for long after the election.

In 1945, a recreated SPC ran James Milne in Winnipeg for Manitoba's provincial election. Milne claimed that neither the Cooperative Commonwealth Federation nor the Labor-Progressive Party was serious about eroding capitalism and poverty. He was defeated, and the party does not appear to have participated in any further Manitoba elections.

== Candidates of the Socialist Party of Canada in Manitoba ==
1910 provincial election:

- W.S. Cummings (Winnipeg Centre) — Cummings was nominated by the SPC as a spoiler candidate in Winnipeg Centre, opposing Fred Dixon who was backed by the Manitoba Liberal Party and the Manitoba Labour Representation Committee. Dixon's supporters alleged that the Conservative were assisting his campaign, and historian Ross McCormack has indicated there may have been some truth to this charge. Cummings finished a distant third with 99 votes (2.44%). Conservative candidate Thomas Taylor defeated Dixon by 73 votes. The SPC was blamed for Dixon's loss, and became marginalized in Winnipeg's labour community until 1919. Little is known of Cummings, aside from the fact that he contested this election.

== See also ==
- List of Manitoba political parties
- List of Canadian socialist parties
