= Fred Dixon (politician) =

Canadian politician

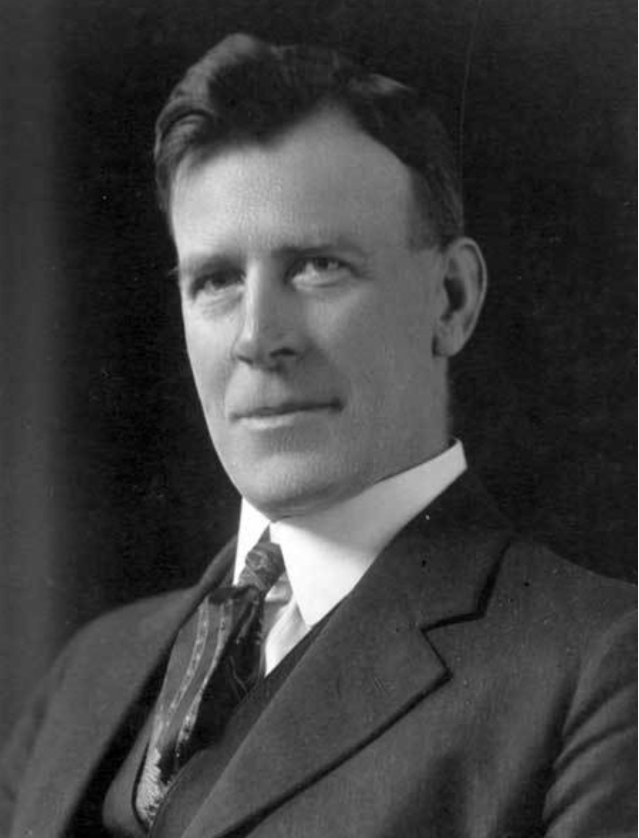
- Dixon, ca. 1921

Leader of the Independent Labour Party of Manitoba
- In office December 1920 – 1923
- Preceded by: Office established
- Succeeded by: John Queen

Member of the Legislative Assembly of Manitoba for Winnipeg
- In office June 29, 1920 – 1923

Personal details
- Born: January 20, 1881 Berkshire, England
- Died: March 18, 1931 (aged 50) Winnipeg, Manitoba
- Cause of death: Cancer
- Party: Independent Labour Party of Manitoba
- Other political affiliations: Independent Progressive
- Spouse: Winona Margaret Flett

Frederick John (Fred) Dixon (January 20, 1881 – March 18, 1931) was a Manitoba politician, and was for several years the dominant figure in the province's mainstream labour and Henry George Single Tax Georgist movements. He was a prominent proponent of proportional representation. He served as a member of the Manitoba Legislature from 1914 to 1923.

== Biography ==
Born in 1881 at Englefield in the English county of Berkshire, Dixon was influenced by the reformist labour politics of his home country, and also favoured the single tax ideas of Henry George.

He apprenticed as a gardener in England.

Dixon arrived in Manitoba in 1903, settling in Winnipeg. He apprenticed as a draftsman and worked as an engraver.

He became a member of the Independent Labour Party. However, he opposed the efforts of some party members to declare the party as socialist and endorse widespread nationalization. The controversy led to the disintegration of the ILP in 1908. Dixon also wrote a weekly column in the Winnipeg labour weekly, The Voice.

Dixon and his friend, Seymour Farmer, who was later mayor of Winnipeg, were active in the League for Taxation of Land Values (the Single Tax programme). They also were active in the League for Direct Legislation, under which people would have the right of referendum, initiative and recall.

Dixon ran for the provincial legislature in the 1910 provincial election as a candidate of the Manitoba Labour Party in Winnipeg Centre. He was also supported by the provincial Liberal Party, whose platform he generally supported. The Socialist Party of Canada, opposed Dixon's centrist labourism and ran a spoiler candidate against him. Dixon lost to Conservative Thomas Taylor by 73 votes; the SPC polled 99.

After the defeat, he again devoted himself to the cause of Direct Legislation. A respected speaker for the Direct Legislation League, he moved to Moose Jaw and worked for the Saskatchewan Direct Legislation League.

In 1914, he married Winona Margaret Flett, a suffragist.

The SPC's actions provoked a backlash among Winnipeg trade unionists. Due to this and to Dixon's high profile among farmers due to his Direct Legislation League work increased his popularity. He ran as an independent in the provincial election of 1914, in one of the two separate elections held in the Winnipeg Centre district at that time. He was supported by both Liberals and the Labour Representation Committee (a successor to the MLP). His platform included home rule for Winnipeg (stronger city powers), women's suffrage, public ownership of utilities, removal of subsidies for private enterprise (including freer trade by lowering the tariff walls to imported manufactured goods), and a referendum on temperance. Despite SPC and Conservative opposition, he took a majority of the votes and was elected for the Winnipeg Centre "B" seat.

In the Legislative Assembly, Dixon helped force an investigation into corruption associated with the construction of the new Manitoba legislative buildings. This led to the downfall of the Robson government in 1915.

He was re-elected in the 1915 election, as an Independent Progressive.

During World War I, Dixon emerged as one of the leading anti-conscriptionists in Winnipeg, and he defended the rights of conscientious objectors to military service. These efforts conflicted with those of Manitoba Liberals, who generally supported the conscription policies of Robert Borden's Unionist government.

In March 1918, Dixon helped found the first branch of the Dominion Labour Party in Winnipeg and served as its first president. It was never a strong or centralized party but did pioneer the way to more developed leftist parties such as the Co-operative Commonwealth Federation. The DLP subsequently branched out to other cities in the Canadian prairies.

Dixon supported strikers during the Winnipeg General Strike of 1919. He undoubtedly played an important role in legitimizing their efforts among the city's reformist labourites. After the editors of the Strike Bulletin were arrested, he published the Western Star and Enlightener. Dixon too was arrested and charged with seditious libel for his published statements. He ably defended himself at the trial, which became a cause célèbre, and was acquitted.

In the summer of 1920, Dixon spoke in Edmonton and other cities in western Canada on labour issues. At this time he insisted on the need for proportional representation as a way for labour to move forward.

In the provincial election of 1920, Dixon headed a united labour list in the city of Winnipeg, which had been re-designed as a city-wide district with ten members elected by single transferable voting. He easily topped the poll with 11,586 votes, almost 7,000 more than his nearest Liberal competitor. There can be little doubt that Dixon was the most popular politician in the city at the time. His vote total was more than the quota required to win a seat, and he was the first to be declared elected, his surplus votes then being transferred to other candidates.

In Winnipeg, Dixon and another DLP candidate, Rev. William Ivens, were elected alongside four Liberals, two Conservatives, a Social Democratic Party candidate and a Socialist Party of Canada candidate.

Nine DLP MLAs, along with one member apiece from the SPC and SDPC, were elected to the Manitoba legislature in 1920. Dixon was the unquestioned leader of the labour parliamentary caucus. He cooperated with more left-wing figures, and kept the group reasonably united through to the election of 1922, although having to establish a new party to do so.

In late 1920, the DLP in Winnipeg was taken over by rightist labourites who had opposed the General Strike. Dixon led a walkout of DLP members, and was involved in founding the province's new Independent Labour Party. The ILP became the primary voice of the parliamentary left in Manitoba, and later become part of the Cooperative Commonwealth Federation party.

Dixon again topped the Winnipeg list in 1922, albeit by the reduced margin of almost 4,000 votes over the nearest Liberal. The total labour caucus was reduced to six members, although Dixon and Ivens were both re-elected.

In 1923, Dixon resigned as a Member of the Legislative Assembly following the death of his wife and two of his children; he was also diagnosed with cancer. John Queen, formerly of the SDPC, became ILP leader in his place.

As his health problems grew more serious, Dixon spent the next few years working as a part-time insurance salesman.

In 1927, he was appointed to a provincial commission investigating the causes of unemployment, in which capacity he co-authored the report, "Seasonal Unemployment in Manitoba."

Fred Dixon died of cancer on March 18, 1931. His close friend J.S. Woodsworth gave the eulogy at his funeral.
