= Lansdowne (electoral district) =

Defunct provincial electoral district in Manitoba, Canada

Lansdowne is a former provincial electoral district in Manitoba, Canada. It was created for the 1888 provincial election, and eliminated with the 1958 election.

Lansdowne was a rural constituency in the province's southwestern corner. For almost its entire history, it was considered safe for the Liberal Party and its successor, the Liberal-Progressive Party. Only two non-Liberals were ever elected for the division, and both were defeated after a single term. Tobias Norris, who served as Premier of Manitoba from 1915 to 1922, represented Lansdowne in the provincial legislature for twenty-one years.

After its elimination, Lansdowne was redistributed into the new constituency of Souris-Lansdowne, as well as into Virden, Arthur, Minnedosa, and Hamiota.

== Members of the Legislative Assembly ==
Name	Party	Took office	Left office
Edward Dickson	Liberal	1888	1896
Tobias Norris	Liberal	1896	1903
Harvey Hicks	Conservative	1903	1907
Tobias Norris	Liberal	1907	1928
Donald McKenzie	Liberal–Progressive	1928	1936
Matthew R. Sutherland	Liberal–Progressive	1936	1949
Thomas Seens	Progressive Conservative	1949	1953
Matthew R. Sutherland	Liberal–Progressive	1953	1958

== See also ==
- List of Manitoba provincial electoral districts
- Canadian provincial electoral districts
