= Dominion Labour Party (Manitoba) =

The Dominion Labour Party (DLP) was formed in Canada in 1918 in opposition to Canadian participation in World War I. The party enjoyed its greatest success in the province of Manitoba.

In March 1918, Arthur Puttee and members of the Winnipeg Trades and Labour Congress (TLC) created the first branch of the Dominion Labour Party in Canada. The DLP was an ideological successor to various other reformist labour groups in Winnipeg, but was more explicitly socialist and actively cooperated with members of the Social Democratic Party of Canada. The Winnipeg local included such figures as Harry Veitch, Fred Tipping, and Member of the Legislative Assembly (MLA) Fred Dixon. In the years after its formation, the DLP would set up other branches in cities throughout the Canadian prairies. It never had a strong central organization, and was more of a network than an organized movement.

The Winnipeg General Strike of 1919 radicalized labour politics in Manitoba, and the DLP soon emerged as a much stronger force than the province's earlier labour parties had been. In the provincial election of 1920, the party formed an electoral alliance with the Socialist Party of Canada, the Social Democrats and a party representing returning ex-soldiers. Dixon easily topped the polled in Winnipeg, and eight other Labour MLAs were elected throughout the province (along with one Socialist and one Social Democrat).

Among the new Labour MLAs were William Ivens, then serving a prison sentence, and A. E. Smith, who later joined Communist Party of Canada. Strictly speaking, not all of these figures were elected as Dominion Labour Party candidates: Smith, though a member of the DLP, campaigned under the banner of the "Brandon Labour Party". The DLP, however, provided the basic framework around which the provincial campaign was based. Dixon was the unquestioned leader of the labour group in the legislature.

Late in 1920, the DLP split between followers of the American Federation of Labor and the One Big Union. When AFL supporters nominated an opponent of the General Strike as a DLP municipal candidate in Winnipeg, many others walked out and formed the rival Independent Labour Party. Dixon, who had previously been neutral, was the leader of the late 1920 walkout. Most other labour parliamentarians also left the DLP for the ILP, with Smith as the only prominent exception.

The ILP subsequently became the dominant labour party in Manitoba. The DLP aligned itself with the new Canadian Labour Party, and soon ceased to exist in the province as an independent organization.

== See also ==
- Labour candidates and parties in Canada (history of the DLP in relation to other early Canadian labour parties)
- List of political parties in Manitoba
