= Tobias Norris =

Canadian politician (1861–1936)

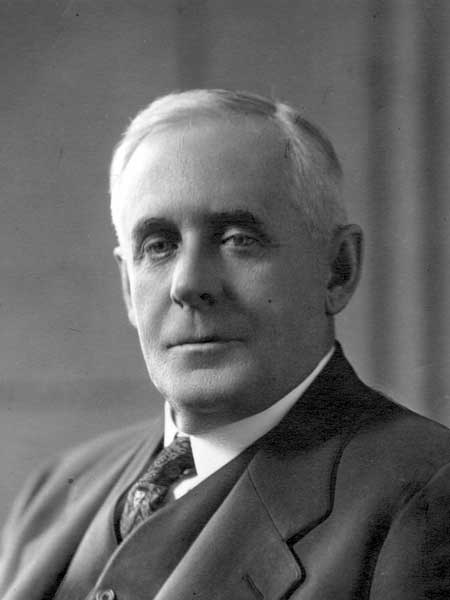
- Norris in 1921

10th Premier of Manitoba
- In office May 12, 1915 – August 8, 1922
- Monarch: George V
- Lieutenant Governor: Douglas Cameron; James A.M. Aikins
- Preceded by: Rodmond Roblin
- Succeeded by: John Bracken

Member of the Legislative Assembly of Manitoba for Lansdowne
- In office January 15, 1896 – July 20, 1903
- Preceded by: Edward Dickson
- Succeeded by: Harvey Hicks
- In office March 7, 1907 – March 14, 1928
- Preceded by: Harvey Hicks
- Succeeded by: Donald Gordon McKenzie

Personal details
- Born: Tobias Crawford Norris; September 5, 1861 Brampton, Canada West
- Died: October 29, 1936 (aged 75) Toronto, Ontario
- Party: Liberal Party
- Occupation: Labourer, farmer, livery-stable owner, auctioneer
- Profession: Politician
- Cabinet: Railway Commissioner (1915–1922); President of the Council (1915–1922)

Tobias Crawford Norris (September 5, 1861 – October 29, 1936) was a Canadian politician who served as the tenth premier of Manitoba from 1915 to 1922. Norris was a member of the Liberal Party.

== Early life ==
Norris was born in Brampton, Canada West (now Ontario), and moved to Manitoba at a young age.

== Career ==
=== Manitoba Legislature ===
He was first elected to the Legislative Assembly of Manitoba in the 1896 provincial election in the constituency of Lansdowne. The Liberals won a landslide majority in this election, though Norris was not called to serve in the cabinet of premier Thomas Greenway.

Norris was narrowly re-elected in the 1899 election, and moved with his party to the opposition benches. He was one of many Liberals defeated in the party's electoral debacle of 1903, losing to Conservative Harvey Hicks by sixteen votes. He defeated Hicks by ninety-six votes in the 1907 election, and emerged as one of the leading figures in the legislative opposition. In 1910, he was chosen to replace Charles Mickle as provincial Liberal leader.

Conservative Premier Rodmond Roblin called an election soon after Norris's selection as leader, and the Conservatives won 28 of 41 seats in the resulting campaign. Norris was re-elected in Lansdowne, and continued as opposition leader. He ran a stronger campaign in the 1914 election, though Roblin's Conservatives still won 28 of 48 seats in an expanded legislature.

=== Manitoba Premier ===
Roblin's government was forced to resign amid a corruption scandal in early-1915, and Norris was called to serve as premier in his place. He was sworn in as premier on May 15, 1915, and also gave himself the powerful position of Railway Commissioner. Norris called another election for August 6, 1915, and was rewarded with a landslide majority. The Liberals and their independent allies won 41 of 48 seats, a record which has never been surpassed in Manitoba history.

Norris's government was considered a leading force for reform in Canada. After receiving a petition from Winona Flett of over 35,000 signatures for women's suffrage, Norris's administration extended the vote to women, It also conducted a prohibition referendum and then imposed prohibition legislation. It brought in workman's compensation as well as a minimum wage. His government also introduced a rural farm credit system. It issued a mother's allowance for widows (an important measure considering his government was in power during and after World War I), a public nursing system and workplace health and safety regulations. Road construction and public works were also expanded. It also brought in Single Transferable Voting, a form of proportional representation, in advance of the 1920 election for the election of Winnipeg MLAs.

The Norris administration's relationship with the federal Liberal Party was generally poor. In 1916, the province eliminated the limited provisions for bilingual education that were agreed to in the Wilfrid Laurier-Thomas Greenway compromise of 1897 to solve the Manitoba Schools Question. The federal Liberals, still led by Laurier, were trying to rebuild a support base among Quebec nationalists. In the federal election of 1917, Norris's government supported the Union government of Robert Borden against the Opposition Liberals led by Wilfrid Laurier. The "Unionist" and "Laurier" Liberals in Manitoba were not reunited until 1922, but Norris's hold on power was never threatened by the split.

Norris was in power during a period of rising labour and farmer radicalism in Manitoba, with the most significant event being the Winnipeg General Strike of 1919. The Norris government was little involved in the strike itself. His administration favoured a negotiated compromise with the strikers and played little role in the strike's suppression by the federal government. When asked about the arrest of several leading strikers, Norris responded, "Just leave us out of this."

Despite his government's progressivism, it did not withstand the growing socialist movement or the wave of farmers' radicalism that swept the country in the form of the United Farmers movement. The election of 1920 resulted in a hung parliament, with 21 Liberals, 11 Labourites, 9 Farmer representatives, 8 Conservatives and 6 independents. The Liberals remained in government, and usually depended on support from Farmer MLAs to pass legislation. It lost a vote of confidence in 1922 and then was resoundingly defeated by the United Farmers of Manitoba (UFM) in the election that followed. The UFM governed as the Progressive Party of Manitoba.

Norris was re-elected MLA in Lansdowne and served as leader of the opposition until 1927. By then, reconciled with the national Liberal Party, he contested the riding of Winnipeg South in the federal election of 1925, where he lost to Conservative Robert Rogers. He had resigned his seat to campaign federally, but was returned to the legislature in a by-election later in the same year.

Norris stood down as Liberal leader before the 1927 election, but remained a member of the legislature and was again elected for Lansdowne. He retired from politics in 1928.

Following Norris's retirement, the Manitoba Liberal Party began negotiations with John Bracken's Progressives for a formal merger. (Because of his government's language policies, Norris had been unacceptable to Bracken's francophone supporters). The two parties were merged in 1932.

== Death ==
Norris died in Toronto in 1936.
