= List of political parties in Manitoba =

== Parties represented in the Legislative Assembly ==
| Name | Founded | Ideology | Leader | Membership | MLAs | In legislature | In government |
|---|---|---|---|---|---|---|---|
| New Democratic Party | 1932 | Social democracy | Wab Kinew | 10,134 (2017) | 34 / 57 | 1932–present | 1969–1977, 1981–1988, 1999–2016, 2023–present |
| Progressive Conservative Party | 1882 | Conservatism | Konrad Narth (Interim) | 10,999 (2025) | 19 / 57 | 1882–present | 1882–1888, 1899–1915, 1940–1950, 1958–1969, 1977–1981, 1988–1999, 2016–2023 |
| Liberal Party | 1870 | Liberalism | Willard Reaves | | 1 / 57 | 1879–1981, 1986–present | 1888–1899, 1915–1922, 1932–1958 |

== Other registered parties ==
| Name | Founded | Ideology | Leader | Membership | In Legislature |
|---|---|---|---|---|---|
| Communist Party of Canada (Manitoba) | 1921 | Communism | Cam Scott | | 1936–1940 |
| Green Party of Manitoba | 1998 | Green politics | Janine Gibson | 121 (2025) | N/A |
| Keystone Party of Manitoba | 2022 | Right-wing libertarianism | Kevin Friesen | | N/A |

== Unregistered parties ==
- Communist Party of Canada (Marxist–Leninist), Manitoba Regional Committee

== Historical parties ==
- Canadian Party 1870
- Dominion Labour Party (in Manitoba) 1918–1920
- Ex-Soldiers and Ex-Sailors Party of Manitoba 1920
- First Peoples Party 1995
- Freedom Party of Manitoba 2007
- Independent Citizen's Party 1920
- Independent Labour Party (in Manitoba) (I) 1890s, 1907
- Independent Labour Party (in Manitoba) (II) 1920–1943
- Independent Native Voice 1995
- Labor-Progressive Party 1941–1959
- Labour Representation Committee (in Manitoba) 1910s
- Libertarian Party of Manitoba, 1980s–2005
- Manitoba Confederation of Regions Party 1984–1991
- Manitoba Co-operative Commonwealth Federation 1932–1961
- Manitoba First 2016–2022 (called Manitoba Party, 2016–2019)
- Manitoba Grey Party 2002–2003
- Manitoba Labour Party 1910
- Manitoba Marijuana Party 2005–2007
- Manitoba Party 1998–2003
- Manitoba Party 2019–2023 (called Manitoba Forward Party, 2019–2020)
- Manitoba Reform Party 1991–1995
- Manitoba Social Credit Party 1935–1981
- Patrons of Industry 1890s
- Prosperity for Posterity Party 1953
- Progressive Party of Manitoba 1921–1948
- Progressive Party of Manitoba (II) 1981–1995
- Prohibitionists 1903
- Provincial Rights Party 1882–1884
- Revolutionary Workers League (in Manitoba) 1977
- Social Democratic Party of Canada (in Manitoba) 1911–1920
- Socialist Party of Canada (in Manitoba) 1904–1922, 1932, 1945
- Sound Money Economics System 1941
- Western Canada Concept Party of Manitoba 1984–1987
- Western Independence Party of Manitoba 1987–1995(?)
- Winnipeg into the '90s 1989
- Winnipeg Labour Party 1899–1903

== See also ==
- Elections Manitoba
