= Canadian Labour Party =

Federal political party (1917–1929)

The Canadian Labour Party (CLP) was an early, unsuccessful attempt at creating a national labour party in Canada. Although it ran candidates in the federal elections of 1917, 1921, 1925, and 1926, it never succeeded in its goal of providing a national forum for the Canadian labour movement. In Alberta, the CLP and its ally, the Dominion Labour Party, ran candidates in municipal elections and had some success. In most provinces, the CLP ceased to exist after 1928 or 1929. The later Co-operative Commonwealth Federation, forerunner of the modern NDP, largely filled the role of a "Labour Party" after its founding in 1932.

== History ==
The CLP was founded in 1917, on the initiative of the Trades and Labour Congress of Canada (TLC). It was intended to be the Canadian equivalent of the British Labour Party and endorsed a variety of reformist labour initiatives. In this sense, it was ideologically closer to A. W. Puttee's original Winnipeg Labour Party than to the revolutionary Socialist Party of Canada.

The CLP endorsed a number of candidates in the 1917 federal election, although none were elected. In 1918, the Canadian TLC leaders adopted a "non-partisan" policy advocated by the American Federation of Labor and the CLP was largely abandoned. Its work was taken up by the Dominion Labor Party, formed in 1918. The DLP was active in Manitoba and also in Alberta (especially in Calgary).

The party was revived in 1921 by future Toronto mayor James Simpson. It again espoused a reformist platform, including the nationalization of banks and public utilities, major extensions in social and labour legislation, and lower taxes on the working class. The CLP was intended to be an "umbrella" organization for the various regional labour parties within Canada. Its primary failure on this front was its inability to convince the leaders of Manitoba's Independent Labour Party to affiliate. Initially, this was due to a local split in the Winnipeg labour movement—the regional Dominion Labour Party (DLP) had been taken over by rightist elements, and the parliamentary labour caucus had retaliated by creating a separate ILP organization. When the DLP affiliated with the CLP, the ILP refused to do the same. ILP leaders such as J. S. Woodsworth and A. A. Heaps remained outside the CLP network throughout the 1920s.

In other regions, the CLP was more successful. The Alberta DLP did not fall into the hands of rightist labourites, and there was no controversy when this party became part of the CLP, although the DLP stayed separate in southern Alberta - it later, on its own, federated with the CCF. Alberta Labour MLAs and MPs, among them William Irvine, Edmonton's Lionel Gibbs and provincial cabinet minister Alexander Ross, were elected in 1921, 1925, 1926 and 1930. (Irvine went on to be elected as CCF MP as well.)

The Federated Labour Party of British Columbia also joined the CLP, and many other reformist labour organizations throughout the country had some connections to the larger organization.

In spite of this, the CLP never became a coherent national party. Most provincial labour parties remained focused on their own local concerns, and the national party organization was comparatively weak (though it was usually successful in preventing vote-splitting among its affiliated groups). The national CLP was also weakened by controversies concerning the role of Communists within the party.

== Relationship with Communists ==
In its earliest years, the Communist Party of Canada supported a united front against the capitalist class. Its provincial organizations joined the CLP in various stages between 1922 and 1924, and the leaders of the Communist Party believed that they would eventually be able to shift CLP policy to reflect their own policies. By the late 1920s, Communist groups had come to dominate the CLP in some regions of the country. (It may be noted that the Communist Party seems to have accepted the CLP's ban on electoral competition between affiliated groups, even to the point of endorsing some rightist labour candidates in whom they had little confidence.)

The Communist presence did not always provoke internal dissension (several Communist delegates were greeted with cheers at CLP conventions), but it did prevent some moderate social democrats from joining. In 1927, social democrats in the Ontario CLP withdrew from the organization to create their own Independent Labour Party. In the same year, J. S. Woodsworth accused the CLP of being controlled by Communist interests, and called for a new national alliance of Independent Labour Parties to take its place.

The CLP's alliance with the Communist Party ended in 1928-29, following a shift in Comintern policy away from the "united front" strategy. The provincial Communist parties either left the CLP during this period, or were expelled.

In most parts of the country, the resulting loss in membership was enough to bring about the effective demise of the CLP. The one exception to this rule appears to have been in Alberta.

== Alberta ==
Despite the break with Communists, in Alberta, the CLP showed significant successes in the late 1920s and 1930s. Lionel Gibbs was a long-time activist both in the Alberta Legislature and on Edmonton's city council for many years. The CLP elected a near-majority to Edmonton's city council in 1929 and held power on Edmonton city council in 1934 and 1935. It federated with the Co-operative Commonwealth Federation (CCF) in 1935, but the Social Credit wave drastically reduced popular support. It maintained a semi-autonomous existence until 1942 when it formally merged with the Alberta CCF.

See Labour candidates and parties in Canada#In Alberta for a list of Alberta Labour representatives in the Alberta legislature

== Legacy ==
Although the CLP did not provide a coherent framework for the various labour organizations across the country, it should get partial credit for the 1920s elections of Calgary's CLP/DLP MPs William Irvine and Joseph Tweed Shaw and Winnipeg's ILP MP J. S. Woodsworth. The party was a prototype for later pan-Canadian labour parties such as the CCF and the New Democratic Party.

Also of note is the fact that the CLP maintained a formal alliance with labour organizations during its existence, as was done by its successor, the NDP (but was not done by the CCF, except in regards its relationship with the Brotherhood of Railway Employees).

== See also ==
- Labour candidates and parties in Canada for a history of the CLP in relation to other early Canadian labour parties
- List of political parties in Canada
