= Caucus revolt =

Policy revolt by political party members

A caucus revolt occurs when enough members of a political party pressure its leadership to step down or to remove planned bills, legislation or policies from its platform. A caucus revolt generally concludes with the party leader resigning their position as such a revolt is usually seen to show poor leadership skills. Often the mere appearance of a revolt in the caucus may be enough to force a leader to step down.

In Westminster style governments, if the party suffering from a caucus revolt is the current government, often an interim leader will be appointed by the party until a leadership convention can be held to elect a new leader, or a general election can be called should the party leader find a way to survive the revolt.

In the United Kingdom the term caucus is used less and the concept is more commonly known as a backbench rebellion.

== Examples ==
The 1937 Social Credit backbenchers' revolt against the premiership of William Aberhart in Alberta ultimately forced the premier to hand over considerable power to a committee of backbenchers, the Social Credit Board. The Board brought in British social credit "experts" who proposed radical legislation which led to a constitutional crisis when it was repeatedly blocked: first disallowed by the federal government, then reserved by Lieutenant-Governor John C. Bowen, and ultimately struck down by the Supreme Court of Canada.

After successfully leading the Liberal Party of Canada and being Prime Minister of Canada for over ten years, Jean Chrétien was forced to step down as both Party Leader and Prime Minister of Canada at the threat of a Caucus Revolt from his long-time Minister of Finance and political rival, Paul Martin Jr.

A caucus revolt against Erin O'Toole caused the 2022 Conservative Party of Canada leadership election.

== See also ==
- Leadership review
- Leadership spill
- Withdrawal of Joe Biden from the 2024 United States presidential election
