= William A. Switzer Provincial Park =

Provincial park in Alberta, Canada

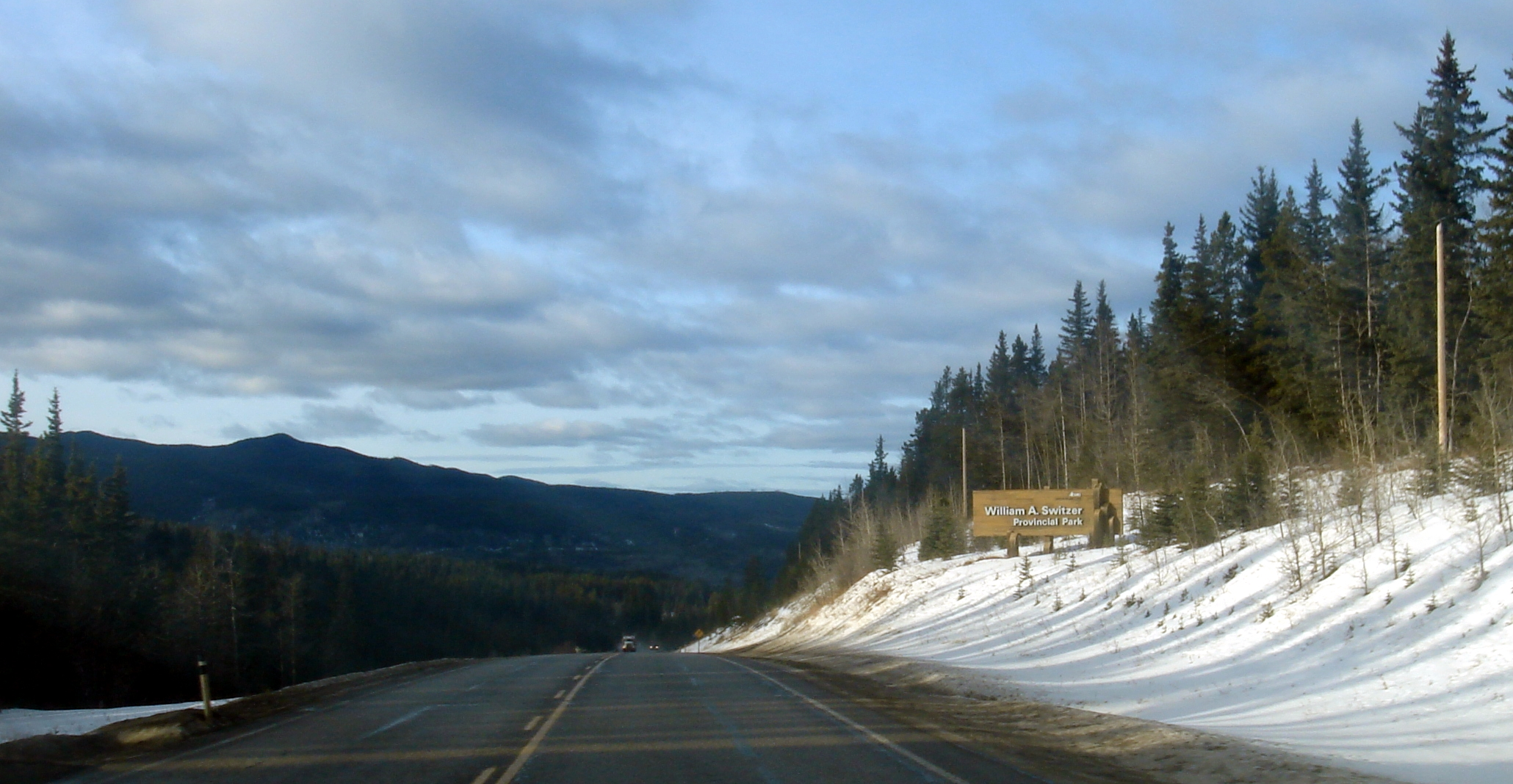
- Highway 40 bisecting William A. Switzer Provincial Park

- Location within Alberta
- Interactive map of William A. Switzer Provincial Park
- Location: Yellowhead County, Alberta Canada
- Nearest city: Hinton
- Coordinates: 53°30′N 117°48′W
- Area: 93 km^{2} (36 sq mi)
- Established: December 22, 1958
- Governing body: Alberta Tourism, Parks and Recreation

William A. Switzer Provincial Park is a provincial park in Alberta, Canada.

It is located on both sides of the Bighorn Highway, between Grande Cache and Hinton. Various campgrounds are maintained on the shores of Gregg Lake, Cache Lake, Blue Lake and Jarvis Lake.

This park is situated within the foothills of Alberta's Rocky Mountains, at an elevation of 1,150 m (3,770 ft) to 1,300 m (4,300 ft) and has a surface of 93 km^{2} (36 sq mi). It was established on December 22, 1958 and is maintained by Alberta Tourism, Parks and Recreation. The park is named after former provincial Member of the Legislative Assembly William Switzer.

== Activities ==
The following activities are available in the park:

- Beach activities, swimming
- Birdwatching (loons, grebes, ospreys, bald eagles, great grey owls, snipes and northern saw-whet owls)
- Camping
- Canoeing and kayaking (including an interpretative canoe route)
- Cross-country skiing (58 km (36 mi) groomed trails, with 33 km (21 mi) at Athabasca Lookout Nordic Centre
- Fishing and ice fishing (brown trout and rainbow trout)
- Front country hiking (at Athabasca Lookout and Beaver Ranch, around Blue Lake, Gregg Lake, Jarvis Lake, Kelley's Bathtub, Kettle and Winter Creek)
- Mountain biking (Gregg Lake trail, Jarvis Lake trail)
- Power boating, sailing, water-skiing, windsurfing
- Snowmobiling (on lakes only)
- Tobogganing (at Athabasca Lookout Nordic Centre)
- Wildlife viewing (white-tailed deer, mule deer, elk, moose, bear, coyote, wood frog, northern Rocky Mountain wolf, beaver, mink, muskrat and woodland caribou)

== Gallery ==
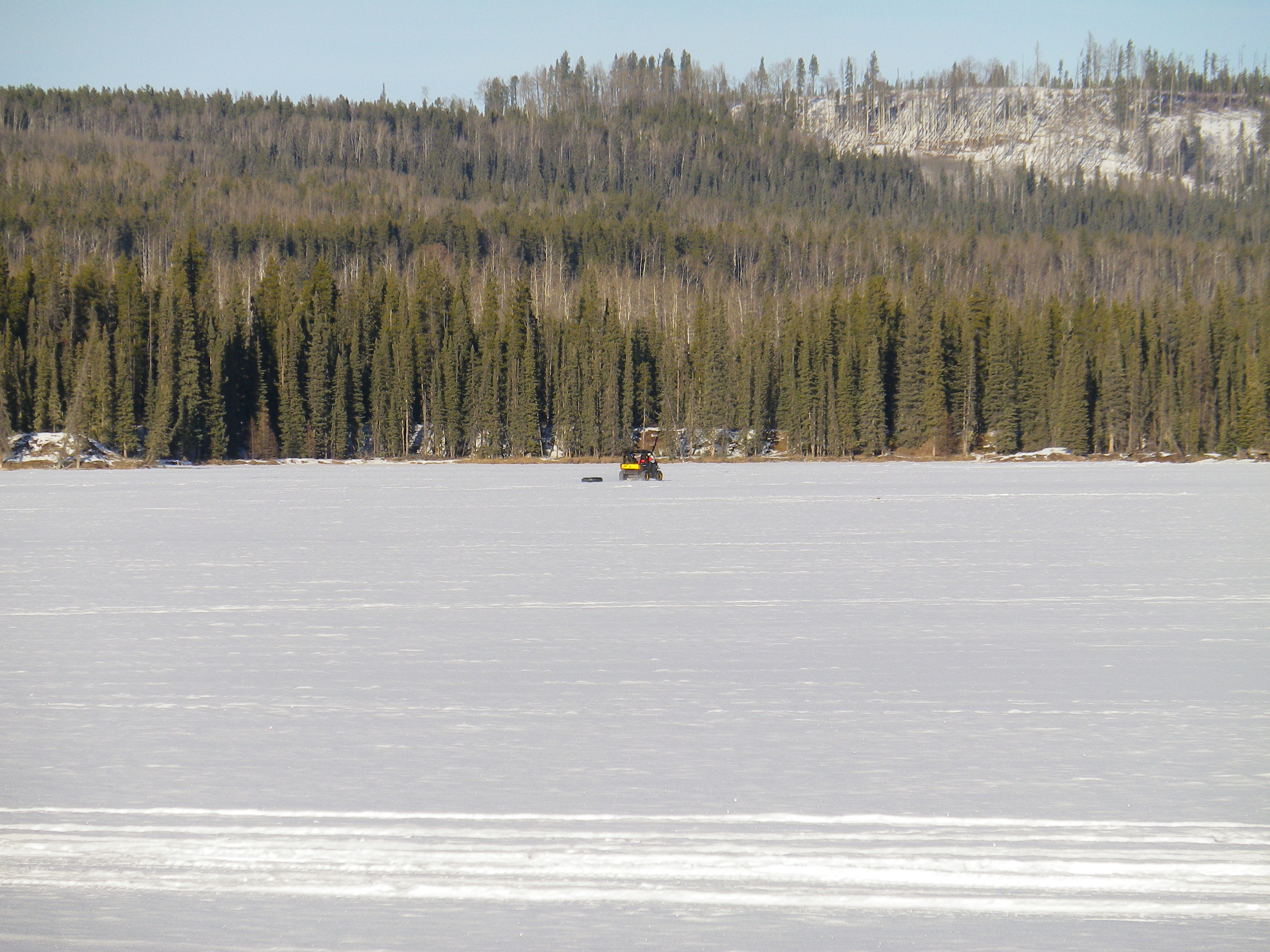
Frozen Gregg Lake with all-terrain vehicle

== See also ==
- List of Alberta provincial parks
- List of National Parks of Canada
