= Christopher Pattinson =

Canadian politician

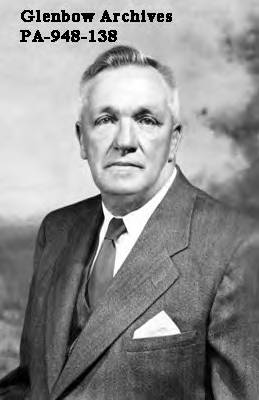

Member of the Legislative Assembly of Alberta
- In office June 28, 1926 – August 22, 1935
- Preceded by: Charles Cross
- Succeeded by: Joseph Unwin
- Constituency: Edson

Personal details
- Born: January 16, 1885 Fletchertown, England
- Died: January 17, 1958 (aged 73)
- Party: Dominion Labor
- Occupation: politician

Christopher Pattinson (January 16, 1885 – January 17, 1958) was a Canadian provincial politician from Alberta. He served as a member of the Legislative Assembly of Alberta from 1926 to 1935 sitting with the Dominion Labor Party caucus in opposition.

== Early life ==
Christopher Pattinson was born January 16, 1885, in Fletchertown, England to John Pattinson and Elizabeth Hayston. He attended Central Labour College and subsequently moved to Canada in 1911. He married Helen Shearer on February 26, 1913, and had three children together.

== Political career ==
Pattinson ran for a seat to the Alberta Legislature in the 1926 Alberta general election. He stood as a Dominion Labor Party candidate in the electoral district of Edson. The three-way race was close and no candidate won a majority of votes on the first count. Under Alternative Voting in use at the time, the least popular candidate was eliminated and his votes transferred. Pattison then won with a 100-vote lead over his remaining opponent.

Pattinson was re-elected in the 1930 Alberta general election. He won a landslide victory over Liberal candidate Charles Payne with nearly 76 percent of the popular vote.

The 1935 Alberta general election would see Pattinson defeated by Joseph Unwin from the Social Credit party. Unwin's campaign had been buoyed by the massive popularity of Bill Aberhart and his visionary Social Credit proposals. As the least popular candidate, Pattinson was eliminated in the second vote count.

Pattison attempted to regain his Edson seat in the legislature by running as a Co-operative Commonwealth candidate in the 1948 Alberta general election. Unwin by that time had been jailed for his part in the Bankers' Toadies incident. Pattinson did not manage to defeat incumbent Social Credit MLA Norman Willmore although finishing second in the three-way race.
