= Angus James Morrison =

Canadian politician

Angus James Morrison (August 30, 1900 – October 26, 1952) was provincial-level politician in Alberta, Canada.

Morrison was an active trade unionist and president of District 18 of the United Mine Workers. He was elected to the Legislative Assembly of Alberta in the 1940 Alberta general election defeating incumbent Joseph Unwin in a hotly contested race. Unwin had been tried and convicted of libel and inciting murder, but his conviction had been reversed, in the Bankers Toadies trial.

Morrison served one term in office and did not run again in 1944.

Legislative Assembly of Alberta
Preceded by Joseph Unwin	MLA Edson; 1940-1944	Succeeded by Norman Willmore
