= William Switzer =

Canadian politician

Bill Switzer

Member of the Legislative Assembly of Alberta
- In office March 29, 1965 – June 30, 1969
- Preceded by: Norman Willmore
- Succeeded by: Robert Dowling
- Constituency: Edson

Personal details
- Born: William Alexander Switzer; September 21, 1920 Edson, Alberta
- Died: June 30, 1969 (aged 48)
- Party: Liberal (provincial); Liberal (federal)
- Spouse: Vivian Gertrude McLeod
- Education: University of Alberta
- Occupation: pharmacist and politician

Military service
- Allegiance: Canada
- Branch/service: Royal Canadian Air Force
- Years of service: 1940-1945
- Rank: Flight lieutenant
- Unit: 193 Squadron

William "Bill" Alexander Switzer (September 21, 1920 – June 30, 1969) was a Canadian politician from Alberta. He served as a pilot in the Royal Canadian Air Force during the Second World War and upon returning to Canada was elected Mayor of Hinton, Alberta, and later a Member of the Legislative Assembly of Alberta from 1965 to 1969 as a member of the opposition in the Liberal caucus. Two years after his death the Government of Alberta named William A. Switzer Provincial Park in his honour.

== Early life ==
William Alexander Switzer was born on September 21, 1920, in Edson, Alberta to Harvey Alexander Switzer and Edith Amelia Lawrence, from respective Scottish and English descents. He attended Edson High School and later the University of Alberta, where he received a degree in pharmacy. Switzer married Vivian Gertrude McLeod on July 22, 1946. They parented twin daughters, Joan and Janice.

== Second World War ==
Switzer's attendance at university was interrupted during his second year by the Second World War, where he enlisted in the Royal Canadian Air Force in 1940 as a pilot, attaining the rank of Flight Lieutenant. During the war, Switzer was sent to RCAF Station Borden for training, and piloted the Hawker Typhoon with the 193 Squadron of the British Royal Air Force based out of England and later France, in a low-level ground-attack role. Switzer participated in the Normandy landings in France, his squadron was charged with taking out early warning and communication systems, and bombing the Normandy beachhead.

Switzer was part of the July 14, 1944 attack on German Field Marshal Erwin Rommel when his and another aircraft diverted after sighting two enemy staff cars. Rommel experienced serious head injuries and returned to Germany to recover. Adolf Hitler later provided Rommel with a choice to commit suicide, following his alleged role in the Valkyrie assassination attempt, with the German public told he died of wounds from the incident.

Later in the war, when Switzer's airplane was hit with anti-aircraft fire during a mission over Falise, he bailed out just in time. He suffered a broken knee and burns from the crash and was captured by a German patrol the following day. In conveyance to an aid station, the patrol was ambushed by American soldiers, which provided Switzer an opportunity to escape. Switzer crawled for a day towards Allied lines until he was found by American soldiers. He subsequently returned to England to recover for several months, then later returned to Canada before Christmas 1944, ending his service in World War Two. Switzer flew 135 missions during the Second World War.

Switzer completed his studies at the University of Alberta and established Switzer's Drugs in Hinton.

== Political career ==
Switzer was elected as the first Mayor of his hometown of Hinton in 1958 and served in that position until 1964.

Switzer unsuccessfully contested seats for both the provincial legislature and federal parliament before winning a provincial by-election in 1965. He initially ran for the Alberta Legislature in the 1952 and 1955 general elections as a candidate for the provincial Liberal party in the electoral district of Edson. He was defeated both times by incumbent Social Credit MLA Norman Willmore.

In the Canadian federal election of 1963 Switzer ran as the Liberal candidate in the electoral district of Jasper—Edson. He finished a distant third place to incumbent Hugh Horner.

In 1965, Switzer attempted another run for the provincial legislature. He ran as a candidate in a by-election held on March 29, 1965, in the Edson electoral district, following Norman Willmore's death in a car accident. Switzer defeated Alberta NDP leader Neil Reimer and A. W. Leonard, a local grocery store owner for the Social Credit Party, by just over 100 votes each, to sit in the 15th Alberta Legislature. Switzer faced Reimer again, as well as Social Credit candidate Arthur Jorgensen, in the 1967 general election for a seat in the 16th Alberta Legislature. Switzer defeated Jorgensen by over 800 votes, while Reimer finished with a close third place.

Switzer died from a heart attack, while in office, on June 30, 1969.

In the subsequent by-election held on October 28, 1969, to fill the vacated Edson seat, Progressive Conservative candidate Bob Dowling edged out Social Credit candidate Arthur Jorgensen and NDP candidate Grant Notley. Liberal Party candidate Roger Woods was fourth.

== Legacy ==
The Government of Alberta named the William A. Switzer Provincial Park in his honour in 1974. In Hinton, the primary road link was named Switzer Drive.
