= Norman Willmore =

Canadian politician

Member of the Legislative Assembly of Alberta
- In office August 8, 1944 – February 2, 1965
- Preceded by: Angus Morrison
- Succeeded by: William Switzer
- Constituency: Edson

Minister of Industries and Labour
- In office November 10, 1953 – August 2, 1955
- Premier: Ernest Manning
- Preceded by: John Robinson
- Succeeded by: Raymond Reierson

Minister of Lands and Forests
- In office August 2, 1955 – February 3, 1965
- Premier: Ernest Manning
- Preceded by: Ivan Casey
- Succeeded by: Henry Ruste

Personal details
- Born: February 13, 1909 Fessenden, North Dakota, US
- Died: February 2, 1965 (aged 55) near Evansburg, Alberta, Canada
- Party: Social Credit
- Spouse: Dorothy
- Children: 1
- Occupation: Clothing and shoe merchant

Norman Alfred Willmore (February 13, 1909 – February 2, 1965) was a politician from Alberta, Canada. He served in the Legislative Assembly of Alberta from 1944 until his death in 1965 as a member of the Social Credit caucus in government. He served as a cabinet minister in the government of Ernest Manning from 1953 until his death.

== Personal life ==
Born in Fessenden, North Dakota, Willmore moved to Canada in 1915 with his parents and was raised in Edmonton, Alberta. He was married to Dorothy and had one son.

== Political career ==
Willmore first ran for a seat to the Alberta Legislature for the first time in the 1944 general election. He stood as the Social Credit candidate in the electoral district of Edson and won a solid majority over two other candidates to pick up the seat for Social Credit.

In the 1948 general election Willmore defeated former MLA Christopher Pattinson, and In the 1952 election Willmore defeated Liberal candidate William Switzer by 400 votes.

On November 10, 1953, Premier Ernest Manning appointed Willmore the Minister of Industries and Labour. In the 1955 Alberta general election Willmore faced Switzer again and defeated him a second time. Shortly thereafter, Premier Manning moved Willmore to the Lands and Forests portfolio. In the 1959 general election Willmore defeated two other candidates with a landslide majority.

In the 1963 general election Willmore easily won a three-way race.

Willmore died in a traffic accident on February 2, 1965, on Alberta Highway 16 near Evansburg, Alberta. He was driving westbound to attend a meeting at Robb, Alberta when a semi tractor-trailer driving eastbound lost its rear wheels, causing a head-on collision. Willmore Wilderness Park was named in his honour on April 12, 1965.
