= Social Credit Board =

Committee in Alberta, Canada

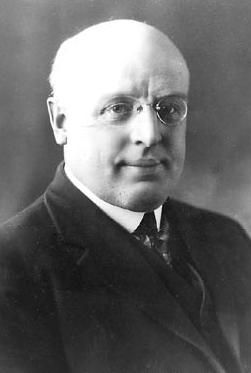
The Social Credit Board was a concession by William Aberhart to stay in power in the wake of the 1937 Social Credit backbenchers' revolt.

The Social Credit Board was a committee in Alberta, Canada, from 1937 until 1948. Composed of Social Credit backbenchers in the Legislative Assembly of Alberta, it was created in the aftermath of the 1937 Social Credit backbenchers' revolt. Its mandate was to oversee the implementation of social credit in Alberta. To this end, it secured the services of L. Dennis Byrne and George Powell, two lieutenants of social credit's British founder, C. H. Douglas.

After requiring all Social Credit members of the Legislative Assembly (MLAs) to sign loyalty oaths to it, the Social Credit Board proceeded to recommend radical legislation regulating banking, taxing banks, and restricting freedom of the press and access to courts. Most of this legislation was either disallowed by the federal government or ruled ultra vires (beyond the powers of) the province by the Supreme Court of Canada; these defeats and the advent of World War II made the Social Credit Board increasingly irrelevant. In its later years it became highly antisemitic, and it was dissolved by the government of Ernest Manning in 1948.

== Beginnings ==
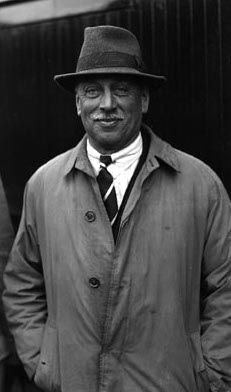
Though C. H. Douglas declined to come to Alberta himself, he sent two assistants to advise the Social Credit Board.

William Aberhart's Social Credit League won the 1935 Alberta general election on a platform of ending the Great Depression by implementing social credit, a new economic theory that posited that poverty could be ended by increasing citizens' purchasing power. By 1937, many Social Credit backbenchers in the Legislative Assembly of Alberta were becoming frustrated with the government's lack of progress. This frustration became the 1937 Social Credit backbenchers' revolt. As a condition of regaining the rebels' support, Aberhart agreed to create the Social Credit Board, to be composed of five Social Credit MLAs and responsible for the implementation of social credit in Alberta. The chair of the Social Credit Board was Glenville MacLachlan; he and three other members had been insurgents during the revolt, while the fifth member, Floyd Baker, had remained loyal to Aberhart.

The Social Credit Board was tasked with the appointment of a Social Credit commission, composed of experts on social credit, to advise on the implementation of social credit in Alberta. Most Social Crediters hoped that C. H. Douglas, the British founder of the social credit movement, would agree to head this commission. Douglas refused MacLachlan's entreaties to do so, but sent two representatives, George Frederick Powell and L. Dennis Byrne, in his stead. One of Powell's first acts was to demand that all Social Credit MLAs sign an oath of loyalty to the Social Credit Board, which almost all did.

== Proposals, disallowance, and judicial defeat (1937–1938) ==
The first round of legislation recommended by the commission and subsequently passed by the legislature included the Credit of Alberta Regulation Act, which required every bank and all their employees to be licensed by the provincial government and to be overseen by a Social Credit Board-appointed directorate, the Bank Employees Civil Rights Act, which prohibited unlicensed banks and their employees from initiating legal proceedings, and amendments to the Judicature Act prohibiting court actions alleging that any of Alberta's legislation was unconstitutional. Lieutenant-Governor of Alberta John Campbell Bowen, asked to give royal assent to these bills, asked Attorney-General John Hugill if he considered them to be valid under the Canadian constitution. Hugill responded in the negative and, after being asked to do so by Aberhart, resigned. Aberhart appointed himself Attorney-General and told Bowen that it was his opinion that the laws were constitutional. Bowen provided royal assent, but all three acts were subsequently disallowed by the federal government.

In 1937's Bankers' Toadies incident, Powell (along with Social Credit whip Joe Unwin) was convicted of criminal libel, sentenced to six months hard labour, and deported to the United Kingdom. The charges stemmed from a pamphlet listing nine men as "bankers' toadies" and advocating their "extermination".

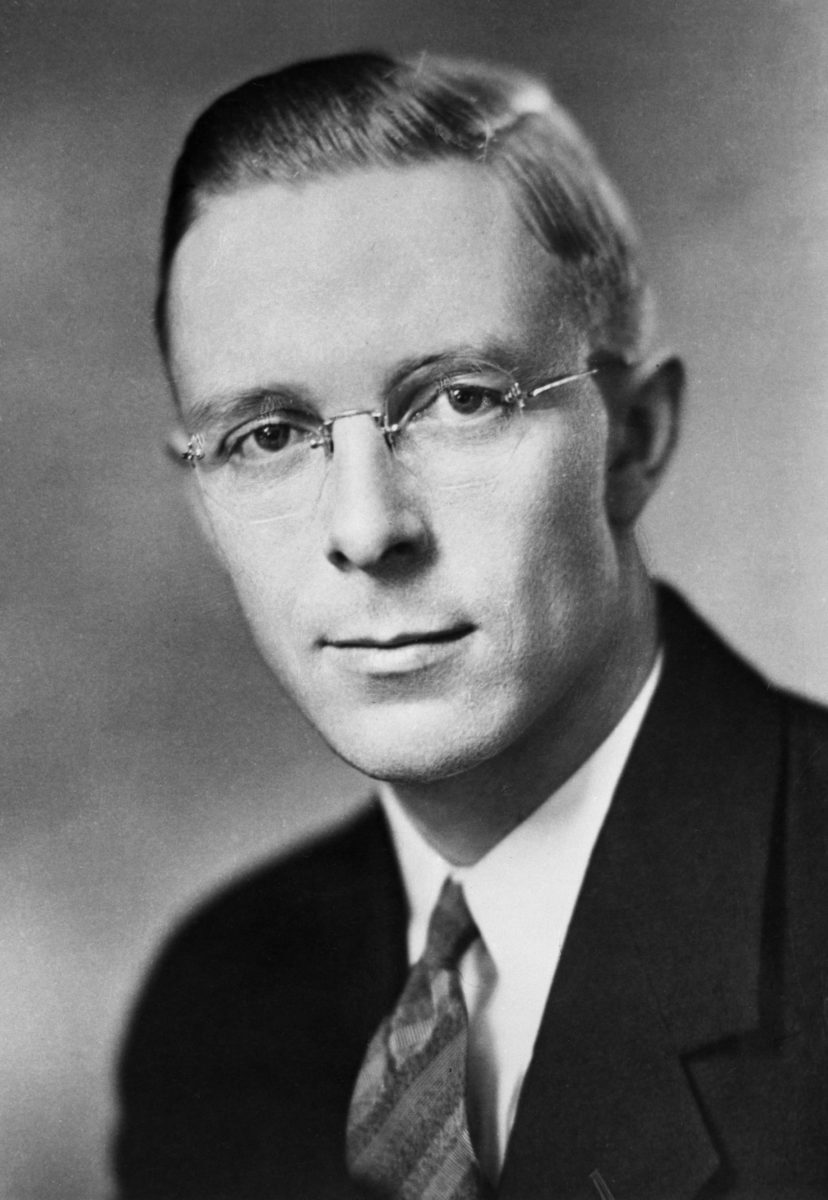
The government of Ernest Manning proved less tolerant of the board than Aberhart's had.

The Social Credit Board's second round of bills included a rewritten version of the Credit of Alberta Regulation Act. The previous version had been disallowed partly on the basis that, under the British North America Act, 1867, banking was a responsibility of the federal government, and the government of Alberta therefore lacked the authority to regulate it. In an attempt to address this concern, the new version substituted the words "credit institutions" for "banks". The Social Credit Board's proposals also included the Bank Taxation Act, which imposed extremely high taxes on banks operating in Alberta, and the Accurate News and Information Act, which severely restricted freedom of the press. All of these bills were passed by the legislature. Bowen, not wishing to have more laws to which he had assented disallowed, reserved assent from all three until the Supreme Court of Canada could comment on their constitutional validity. It did so in 1938's Reference re Alberta Statutes, which found all three to be unconstitutional. The Social Credit Board's major initiatives had failed.

== Decline and dissolution (1939–1948) ==
World War II further reduced the Social Credit Board's importance, as implementation of social credit took a backseat to the war effort. Instead of proposing new policy, the board devoted itself to propaganda; its members spoke across the province about social credit, and it distributed vast numbers of pamphlets and leaflets (272,900 in 1939). When Aberhart died in 1943, he was replaced by Ernest Manning, who was by this time considerably less open to radical social credit proposals than Aberhart had been. He soon transferred many of the Social Credit Board's responsibilities to the new department of Economic Affairs, of which L. D. Byrne was the deputy minister.

Byrne, the remaining Douglas lieutenant after Powell's deportation, shared both Douglas's economic theories and his antisemitism. Under his influence, the Social Credit Board began to propagate anti-Jewish conspiracy theories, including those espoused by the Russian forgery The Protocols of the Elders of Zion. Its 1943 report alleged "a plot, world-wide in scope, deliberately engineered by a small number of ruthless international financiers", most of whom were Jewish. Its 1947 report repeated these allegations, and also proposed a new voting system in which voters would state their choices publicly, and be taxed only for those government programs they supported during the election. Political parties were to be abolished in favour of "leagues of electors", and all farmland was to be appropriated by the government. Manning, benignly neglectful of the Social Credit Board to this point, took this as "a direct challenge to his leadership, a shot across the bow". He quickly introduced a resolution in the legislature to "condemn, repudiate, and completely dissociate" the legislature from "any statements or publications which are incompatible with the established British ideals of democratic freedom, or which endorse, excuse, or incite anti-Semitism or racial or religious intolerance in any form". In November 1947 he announced that the Social Credit Board would cease to exist effective March 1948, and in February 1948 he asked for and received Byrne's resignation as deputy minister of Economic Affairs.

Despite its beginnings as a vehicle of intended economic revolution, the board achieved nothing of lasting importance. Once its early efforts were foiled by the federal government and the courts, it ceased to have much influence. By 1948, the dire conditions that had sparked Albertans' enthusiasm for radical economic reform had vanished, and with it their interest in social credit. While the Social Crediters remained in government until 1971, the revolutionary spirit of the 1930s was all but forgotten: as Athabasca University historian Alvin Finkel notes, post-war Social Credit "had been transformed from a mass, eclectic movement for social reform led by monetary reformers to a relatively small government party that enjoyed considerable support from various sectors of the Alberta population for its judicious combination of right-wing rhetoric and social service and road-building programs." The Social Credit Board, with its reform mandate and its direct pipeline to Douglas, was no longer needed.
