= Edson (provincial electoral district) =

Defunct provincial electoral district in Alberta, Canada

Coordinates: 53.59°N 116.43°W

Alberta electoral district

Defunct provincial electoral district
- Legislature: Legislative Assembly of Alberta
- District created: 1913
- District abolished: 1986
- First contested: 1913
- Last contested: 1982

Edson was a provincial electoral district in Alberta, Canada, mandated to return a single member to the Legislative Assembly of Alberta from 1913 to 1986.

== History ==
The electoral district was created during the 1913 Alberta general election from all of Lac Ste. Anne and the western portions of the Innsifail, Olds, Stony Plain and Red Deer provincial electoral districts.

From 1924 to 1956, the district used instant-runoff voting to elect its MLA.

Despite numerous boundary revisions in the province, Edson kept most of its original area. The riding was abolished into the new West Yellowhead riding in 1986.

=== Members of the Legislative Assembly (MLAs) ===
Members of the Legislative Assembly for Edson
Assembly	Years	Member	Party
3rd	1913–1917	Charles Wilson Cross	Liberal
4th	1917–1921	Charles Wilson Cross	Liberal
5th	1921–1926	Charles Wilson Cross	Liberal
6th	1926–1930	Christopher Pattinson	Dominion Labor
7th	1930–1935	Christopher Pattinson	Dominion Labor
8th	1935–1940	Joseph Unwin	United Farmers
9th	1940–1944	Angus James Morrison	Dominion Labor
10th	1944–1948	Norman Willmore	Social Credit
11th	1948–1952	Norman Willmore	Social Credit
12th	1952–1955	Norman Willmore	Social Credit
13th	1955–1959	Norman Willmore	Social Credit
14th	1959–1963	Norman Willmore	Social Credit
15th	1963–1967	Norman Willmore	Social Credit
16th	1967–1971	William Switzer	Liberal
17th	1971–1975	Robert Wagner Dowling	Progressive Conservative
18th	1975–1979	Robert Wagner Dowling	Progressive Conservative
19th	1979–1982	Ian Reid	Progressive Conservative
20th	1982–1986	Ian Reid	Progressive Conservative
See West Yellowhead electoral district from 1986-Present

== Election results ==
=== 1913 ===
1913 Alberta general election
Party	Candidate	Votes	%	±%
Liberal	Charles Wilson Cross	671	51.03%	–
Conservative	H. H. Verge	644	48.97%	–
Total		1,315	–	–
Rejected, spoiled and declined		N/A	–	–
Eligible electors / turnout		N/A	N/A	–
Liberal pickup new district.				
Source(s) Source: "Edson Official Results 1913 Alberta general election". Alberta Heritage Community Foundation.

=== 1917 ===
1917 Alberta general election
Party	Candidate	Votes	%	±%
Liberal	Charles Wilson Cross	1,116	62.91%	11.88%
Conservative	J. R. McIntosh	455	25.65%	-23.32%
Socialist	John Reid	203	11.44%	–
Total		1,774	–	–
Rejected, spoiled and declined		N/A	–	–
Eligible electors / turnout		N/A	N/A	–
Liberal hold		Swing		-5.72%
Source(s) Source: "Edson Official Results 1917 Alberta general election". Alberta Heritage Community Foundation.

=== 1921 ===
1921 Alberta general election
Party	Candidate	Votes	%	±%
Liberal	Charles Wilson Cross	1,321	57.94%	-4.97%
Dominion Labor	John Diamond	959	42.06%	–
Total		2,280	–	–
Rejected, spoiled and declined		N/A	–	–
Eligible electors / turnout		N/A	N/A	–
Liberal hold		Swing		-10.44%
Source(s) Source: "Edson Official Results 1921 Alberta general election". Alberta Heritage Community Foundation.

=== 1926 ===
1926 Alberta general election
Party	Candidate	Votes	%	±%
First count
Dominion Labor	Christopher Pattinson	1,116	40.13%	-1.93%
Conservative	A. McIntyre	963	34.63%	–
Liberal	F. J. Doyle	702	25.24%	-32.70%
Total		2,781	–	–
Ballot transfer results
Dominion Labor	Christopher Pattinson	1,219	51.70%	–
Conservative	A. McIntyre	1,139	48.30%	–
Liberal	F. J. Doyle	Eliminated	–	–
Total		2,358	–	–
Rejected, spoiled and declined		5	–	–
Eligible electors / turnout		4,765	58.47%	–
Dominion Labor gain from Liberal		Swing		-5.67%
Source(s) Source: "Edson Official Results 1926 Alberta general election". Alberta Heritage Community Foundation.

=== 1930 ===
1930 Alberta general election
Party	Candidate	Votes	%	±%
Dominion Labor	Christopher Pattinson	2,434	75.80%	35.73%
Liberal	Chas. E. Payne	777	24.20%	-1.04%
Total		3,211	–	–
Rejected, spoiled and declined		139	–	–
Eligible electors / turnout		5,455	61.41%	–
Dominion Labor hold		Swing		23.53%
Source(s) Source: "Edson Official Results 1930 Alberta general election". Alberta Heritage Community Foundation. Archived from the original on June 12, 2011.

=== 1935 ===
1935 Alberta general election
Party	Candidate	Votes	%	±%
First count
Social Credit	Joseph Unwin	2,154	41.52%	–
Liberal	John Sedgwick Cowper	1,620	31.23%	7.03%
Dominion Labor	Christopher Pattinson	1,414	27.26%	-48.54%
Total		5,188	–	–
Ballot transfer results
Social Credit	Joseph Unwin	2,443	54.16%	–
Liberal	John Sedgwick Cowper	2,068	45.84%	–
Dominion Labor	Christopher Pattinson	Eliminated	–	–
Total		4,511	–	–
Rejected, spoiled and declined		279	–	–
Eligible electors / turnout		7,192	76.02%	–
Social Credit gain from Dominion Labor		Swing		-25.80%
Source(s) Source: "Edson Official Results 1935 Alberta general election". Alberta Heritage Community Foundation.

=== 1940 ===
1940 Alberta general election
Party	Candidate	Votes	%	±%
First count
Dominion Labor	Angus James Morrison	2,211	44.59%	17.33%
Social Credit	Joseph Unwin	1,949	39.31%	-2.31%
Co-operative Commonwealth	W. L. Dickout	798	16.10%	–
Total		4,958	–	–
Ballot transfer results
Dominion Labor	Angus James Morrison	2,558	54.92%	–
Social Credit	Joseph Unwin	2,100	45.08%	–
Co-operative Commonwealth	W. L. Dickout	Eliminated	–	–
Total		4,658	–	–
Rejected, spoiled and declined		298	–	–
Eligible electors / turnout		7,228	71.78%	–
Dominion Labor gain from Social Credit		Swing		0.00%
Source(s) Source: "Edson Official Results 1940 Alberta general election". Alberta Heritage Community Foundation.

=== 1944 ===
1944 Alberta general election
Party	Candidate	Votes	%	±%
Social Credit	Norman Willmore	2,536	57.60%	18.29%
Co-operative Commonwealth	W. H. Dixon	1,280	29.07%	12.97%
Labor-Progressive	George Brownlow	587	13.33%	–
Total		4,403	–	–
Rejected, spoiled and declined		111	–	–
Eligible electors / turnout		6,747	66.90%	–
Social Credit gain from Dominion Labor		Swing		14.26%
Source(s) Source: "Edson Official Results 1944 Alberta general election". Alberta Heritage Community Foundation.

=== 1948 ===
1948 Alberta general election
Party	Candidate	Votes	%	±%
Social Credit	Norman Willmore	2,543	50.58%	-7.02%
Co-operative Commonwealth	Christopher Pattinson	1,715	34.11%	5.04%
Liberal	William E. Robinson	770	15.31%	–
Total		5,028	–	–
Rejected, spoiled and declined		428	–	–
Eligible electors / turnout		8,337	65.44%	–
Social Credit hold		Swing		-6.03%
Source(s) Source: "Edson Official Results 1948 Alberta general election". Alberta Heritage Community Foundation.

=== 1952 ===
1952 Alberta general election
Party	Candidate	Votes	%	±%
Social Credit	Norman Willmore	2,480	55.79%	5.22%
Liberal	William Switzer	1,965	44.21%	28.89%
Total		4,445	–	–
Rejected, spoiled and declined		335	–	–
Eligible electors / turnout		7,862	60.80%	–
Social Credit hold		Swing		-2.44%
Source(s) Source: "Edson Official Results 1952 Alberta general election". Alberta Heritage Community Foundation.

=== 1955 ===
1955 Alberta general election
Party	Candidate	Votes	%	±%
Social Credit	Norman Willmore	2,529	51.96%	-3.83%
Liberal	William Switzer	2,146	44.09%	-0.11%
Conservative	Thomas Booker	192	3.94%	–
Total		4,867	–	–
Rejected, spoiled and declined		445	–	–
Eligible electors / turnout		7,515	70.69%	–
Social Credit hold		Swing		-1.86%
Source(s) Source: "Edson Official Results 1955 Alberta general election". Alberta Heritage Community Foundation.

=== 1959 ===
1959 Alberta general election
Party	Candidate	Votes	%	±%
Social Credit	Norman Willmore	3,074	57.07%	5.11%
Progressive Conservative	Chris. H. R. Nielsen	1,678	31.15%	–
Liberal	Melvyn A. Parkyn	634	11.77%	-32.32%
Total		5,386	–	–
Rejected, spoiled and declined		22	–	–
Eligible electors / turnout		8,835	61.21%	–
Social Credit hold		Swing		9.02%
Source(s) Source: "Edson Official Results 1959 Alberta general election". Alberta Heritage Community Foundation.

=== 1963 ===
1963 Alberta general election
Party	Candidate	Votes	%	±%
Social Credit	Norman Willmore	2,668	56.29%	-0.79%
Liberal	Bertram E. Schoeppe	1,371	28.92%	17.15%
New Democratic	James D. Torgersen	701	14.79%	–
Total		4,740	–	–
Rejected, spoiled and declined		11	–	–
Eligible electors / turnout		8,647	54.94%	–
Social Credit hold		Swing		0.72%
Source(s) Source: "Edson Official Results 1963 Alberta general election". Alberta Heritage Community Foundation.

=== 1967 ===
1967 Alberta general election
Party	Candidate	Votes	%	±%
Liberal	William Switzer	2,803	41.03%	12.11%
Social Credit	Arthur O. Jorgensen	2,372	34.72%	-21.56%
New Democratic	Neil Reimer	1,656	24.24%	9.45%
Total		6,831	–	–
Rejected, spoiled and declined		27	–	–
Eligible electors / turnout		9,457	72.52%	–
Liberal gain from Social Credit		Swing		-10.53%
Source(s) Source: "Edson Official Results 1967 Alberta general election". Alberta Heritage Community Foundation.

=== 1971 ===
1971 Alberta general election
Party	Candidate	Votes	%	±%
Progressive Conservative	Robert Wagner Dowling	3,900	59.13%	–
Social Credit	Rollie Mohr	1,947	29.52%	-5.21%
New Democratic	Walter Seewitz	749	11.36%	-12.89%
Total		6,596	–	–
Rejected, spoiled and declined		217	–	–
Eligible electors / turnout		10,058	67.74%	–
Progressive Conservative gain from Liberal		Swing		11.65%
Source(s) Source: "Edson Official Results 1971 Alberta general election". Alberta Heritage Community Foundation.

=== 1975 ===
1975 Alberta general election
Party	Candidate	Votes	%	±%
Progressive Conservative	Robert Wagner Dowling	3,872	65.09%	5.96%
New Democratic	John Lindsay	1,426	23.97%	12.62%
Social Credit	Ralph Bond	651	10.94%	-18.57%
Total		5,949	–	–
Rejected, spoiled and declined		12	–	–
Eligible electors / turnout		10,506	56.74%	–
Progressive Conservative hold		Swing		5.75%
Source(s) Source: "Edson Official Results 1975 Alberta general election". Alberta Heritage Community Foundation.

=== 1979 ===
1979 Alberta general election
Party	Candidate	Votes	%	±%
Progressive Conservative	Ian Reid	4,517	53.70%	-11.38%
New Democratic	Ron Hodgins	2,958	35.17%	11.20%
Social Credit	W.L. Land	676	8.04%	-2.91%
Liberal	Herbert Maris	260	3.09%	–
Total		8,411	–	–
Rejected, spoiled and declined		N/A	–	–
Eligible electors / turnout		13,855	60.71%	–
Progressive Conservative hold		Swing		-11.29%
Source(s) Source: "Edson Official Results 1979 Alberta general election". Alberta Heritage Community Foundation.

=== 1982 ===
1982 Alberta general election
Party	Candidate	Votes	%	±%
Progressive Conservative	Ian Reid	6,003	57.07%	3.36%
New Democratic	Eilir Thomas	3,232	30.73%	-4.44%
Western Canada Concept	Lynn Lewis	1,284	12.21%	–
Total		10,519	–	–
Rejected, spoiled and declined		35	–	–
Eligible electors / turnout		16,208	65.12%	–
Progressive Conservative hold		Swing		3.90%
Source(s) Source: "Edson Official Results 1982 Alberta general election". Alberta Heritage Community Foundation.

== Plebiscite results ==
=== 1957 liquor plebiscite ===
1957 Alberta liquor plebiscite results: Edson
Question A: Do you approve additional types of outlets for the sale of beer, wine and spirituous liquor subject to a local vote?
Ballot choice	Votes	%
Yes	2,222	82.08%
No	485	17.92%
Total votes	2,707	100%
Rejected, spoiled and declined	14	
7,823 eligible electors, turnout 34.82%

On October 30, 1957, a stand-alone plebiscite was held province wide in all 50 of the then current provincial electoral districts in Alberta. The government decided to consult Alberta voters to decide on liquor sales and mixed drinking after a divisive debate in the Legislature. The plebiscite was intended to deal with the growing demand for reforming antiquated liquor control laws.

The plebiscite was conducted in two parts. Question A, asked in all districts, asked the voters if the sale of liquor should be expanded in Alberta, while Question B, asked in a handful of districts within the corporate limits of Calgary and Edmonton, asked if men and women should be allowed to drink together in establishments.

Province wide, Question A of the plebiscite passed in 33 of the 50 districts, while Question B passed in all five districts. Edson voted in favour of the proposal, with the largest percentage in the province. Voter turnout in the district was dismal, falling significantly below the province wide average of 46%.

Official district returns were released to the public on December 31, 1957. The Social Credit government in power at the time did not consider the results binding. However the results of the vote led the government to repeal all existing liquor legislation and introduce an entirely new Liquor Act.

Municipal districts lying inside electoral districts that voted against the plebiscite were designated Local Option Zones by the Alberta Liquor Control Board and considered effective dry zones. Business owners who wanted a licence had to petition for a binding municipal plebiscite in order to be granted a licence.

== See also ==
- List of Alberta provincial electoral districts
- Canadian provincial electoral districts
