= Glenville MacLachlan =

Canadian politician

Glenville L. MacLachlan
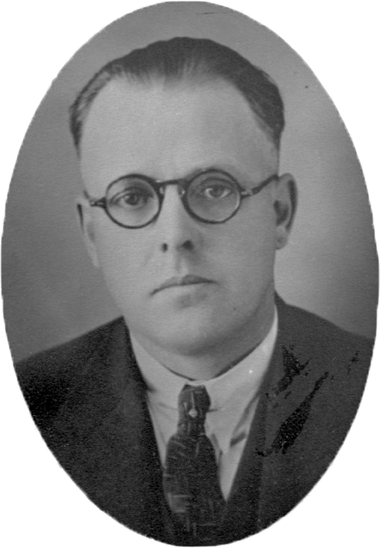

Member of the Legislative Assembly of Alberta
- In office 1935–1940
- Preceded by: George N. Johnston
- Succeeded by: District abolished
- Constituency: Coronation

Personal details
- Born: June 4, 1895 Watford, Ontario
- Died: January 28, 1973 (aged 77) Calgary, Alberta
- Party: Social Credit

Glenville Lawrence MacLachlan (June 4, 1895 – January 28, 1973) was a provincial politician from Alberta, Canada. He served as a member of the Legislative Assembly of Alberta from 1935 to 1940, sitting with the Social Credit caucus in government. MacLachlan was one of the leaders of the 1937 Social Credit backbenchers' revolt and became chairman of the Social Credit Board, a body created as a result of the revolt, that had the purpose of overseeing the implementation of social credit economic theory in Alberta. In 1940, the Social Credit Association denied him the right to run as a party candidate in that year's election.
