= Bankers' Toadies incident =

1937 assassination threat in Canada

The Bankers' Toadies incident occurred in 1937 in the Canadian province of Alberta when a pamphlet advocating the extermination of nine men identified as "bankers' toadies" was distributed to Members of the Legislative Assembly (MLAs). The men were opponents of the Social Credit government of Premier William Aberhart, which had been elected on a promise of giving Albertans monthly dividends. Aberhart blamed the banking system for failing to fulfil this pledge.

David Duggan, leader of the Conservative Party of Alberta and one of the men named, raised concerns about the pamphlet's contents in the Legislative Assembly of Alberta. Police raided the Social Credit League's Edmonton headquarters and seized thousands of copies of the pamphlet. Joseph Unwin, an MLA and Social Credit whip, and George Frederick Powell, a Social Credit Board advisor, were arrested and charged with defamatory libel and counselling to murder. Both were convicted of libel and Justice William Carlos Ives sentenced them to hard labour. The incident contributed to Aberhart's reduced authority within his caucus and negatively affected his ability to pass his legislative agenda.

== Background ==
William Aberhart's Social Credit League won a substantial victory in the 1935 Alberta provincial election largely on its promise to implement social credit, an economic theory proposed by the British engineer C. H. Douglas. Douglas's theory stipulated that the monetary system of the time was outproducing society's purchasing power and would eventually collapse if not rectified. Bankers were disincentivized to make the necessary corrections, mainly to increase access to credit, because they profited from keeping the cost of obtaining credit high. Aberhart's solution involved, among other things, providing Albertans with monthly 'credit dividends' of $25 (equivalent to $560 in 2025); this dividend was not a loan, but money given to residents of the province with few or no stipulations.

By 1937, Aberhart's struggle to implement these dividends and make other progress towards implementing universal social credit led many of his backbenchers to suspect that he was unwilling or unable to do so. This belief, combined with a suspicion that he did not properly understand Douglas's theories, led to the 1937 Social Credit backbenchers' revolt in which some MLAs from the Social Credit Party threatened to defeat the government in a confidence motion, potentially triggering a provincial election. One outcome of the revolt was Aberhart's ceding several government powers to the Social Credit Board, made up of five Social Credit backbenchers. Glenville MacLachlan, its chair, travelled to the United Kingdom, where he asked Douglas to come to Alberta and serve as its advisor. Douglas declined, but sent two of his supporters, L. D. Byrne and George Frederick Powell, to the province.

After the 1935 election, and in response to what they saw as the radically anti-business views of the Aberhart government and the Social Credit Board, Alberta's mainstream opposition parties—chiefly the Liberals and the Conservatives—began to cooperate as the People's League. This coalition attracted large crowds at their rallies, including in Aberhart's constituency. A People's League meeting called for Aberhart's resignation and for the Canadian Broadcasting Corporation to stop airing his Sunday radio show.

== Pamphlet ==
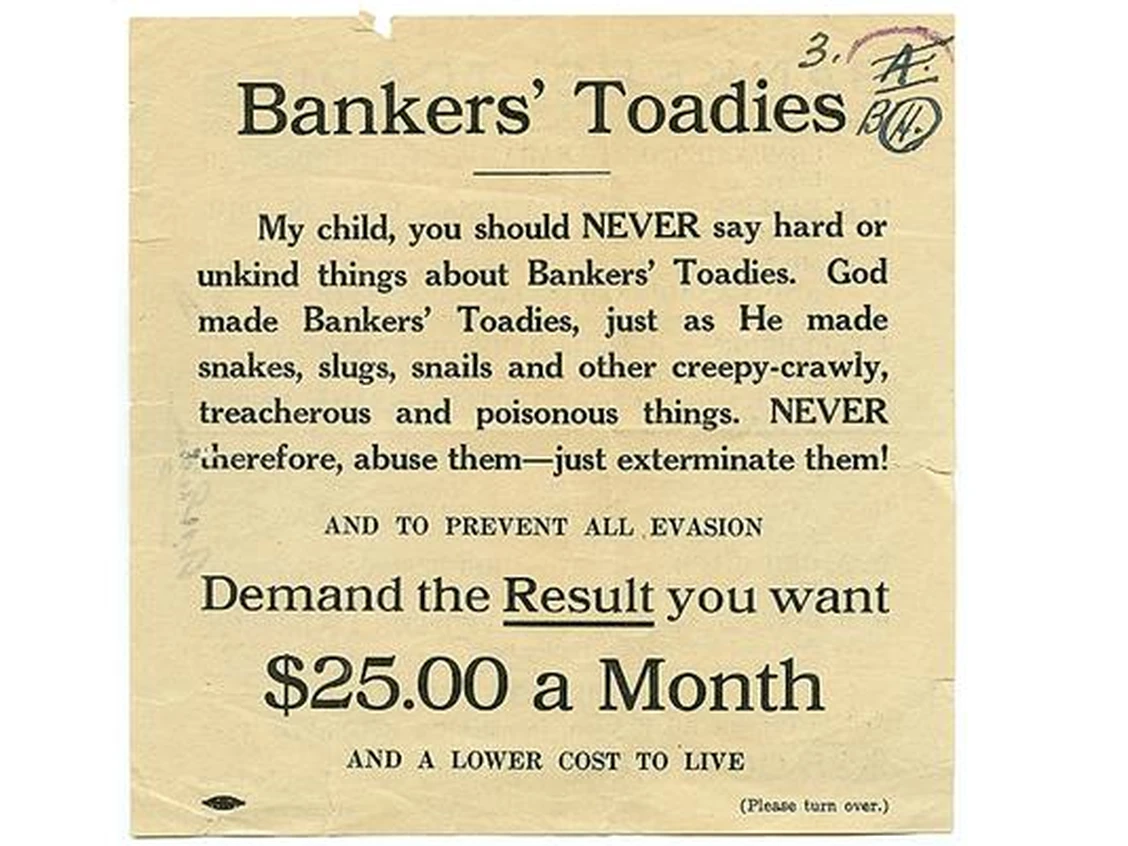
The front of the pamphlet distributed in the Legislative Assembly of Alberta

On September 29, 1937, a one-page pamphlet was left on the desks of every member of the Legislative Assembly of Alberta. The front of the pamphlet referred to a group called "bankers' toadies" and unfavourably compared them to small, poisonous creatures such as snakes and snails. The text also said that the group should not be engaged in conversation, but rather to "exterminate them".

The reverse of the pamphlet listed the names and addresses of nine Alberta citizens and called for the group to be "exterminated" to achieve a distribution of $25 a month to all Alberta residents. The men listed in the pamphlet were:

- David Duggan, leader of the Conservative Party of Alberta
- S. W. Field, lawyer and president of the People's League
- H. H. Parlee, lawyer and president of the Liberals' Edmonton constituency association
- John Lymburn, lawyer, member of the People's League, and former attorney-general of Alberta
- H. R. Milner, lawyer and president of the Conservatives' Edmonton constituency association
- G. D. Hunt, investment broker
- L. Y. Cairns, lawyer, member of the Conservatives' provincial executive
- G. W. Auxier, lawyer and secretary of the People's League
- William Antrobus Griesbach, lawyer, member of the Senate of Canada, and former member of the House of Commons of Canada and mayor of Edmonton

Later that day, Duggan spoke in the Legislative Assembly of Alberta about the pamphlet, stating it had been distributed in and around the legislature building and that he was named in the document. On October 3, the police raided the Social Credit League's Edmonton office and seized either 4,000 or 7,000 copies of the pamphlet. Powell and Joseph Unwin, a Social Credit MLA, were arrested on charges of defamatory libel and counselling to murder.

== Trials ==
Aberhart, who was simultaneously premier and attorney-general of Alberta, withdrew the Crown prosecutor assigned to the case. Either a justice of the peace or the trial judge of the two cases, William Carlos Ives, countered by appointing a public prosecutor to allow the case to proceed.

On October 27, both men appeared before the police magistrate A. H. Gibson for their preliminary hearings on charges of defamatory libel (the counselling to murder charge had been dropped). Unwin opted for a jury trial; Powell chose to be tried by a judge alone. Unwin could not afford an attorney and asked Lucien Maynard to help with his legal fees. Unwin's trial proceeded first, on November 12. He testified that he had ordered the government-funded pamphlets and circulated them as a publication of the "United Democrats", a fictitious organization that listed its address as that of Unwin's home. According to Unwin, the pamphlet's text, minus the named individuals, had been provided to him by Powell; he had sent it to the printer without any changes, and he was surprised to see the list of names in the final version. Unwin was sentenced to three months of hard labour at Fort Saskatchewan Penitentiary.

Powell's trial proceeded immediately after Unwin's, and his testimony contradicted much of what Unwin had said. Powell testified that Unwin had put the list of names on the pamphlet. Ives found Unwin's testimony more credible, convicted Powell on November 15, and sentenced him to six months of hard labour at Fort Saskatchewan Penitentiary and recommended his deportation. Ives also declared that Powell was partly responsible for a growing disrespect for the laws of Alberta, leading to social turmoil. Both men appealed their convictions and sentences, and both were unsuccessful.

== Aftermath ==
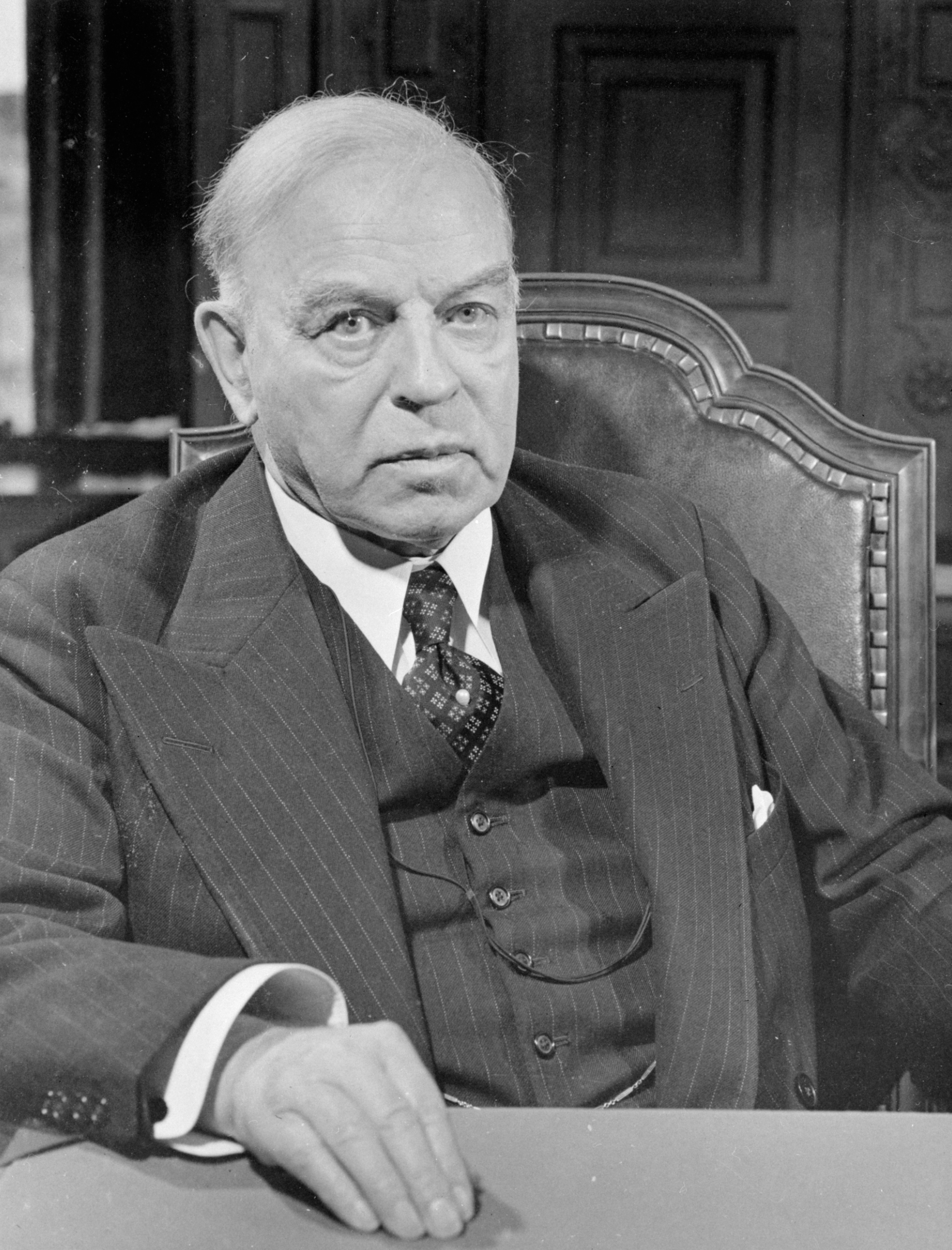
Prime Minister William Lyon Mackenzie King refused to grant clemency to the convicted Social Crediters.

A Toronto spokesman for the Communist Party of Canada protested the arrests and called for a united front against the People's League. Aberhart maintained that the men had been jailed based on harmless political humour. He petitioned the federal government to pardon them and encouraged his radio program's supporters to write letters to William Lyon Mackenzie King, the prime minister of Canada, to advocate for their release. The federal government declined to release them as it did not want the federal executive to interfere with the judiciary. Every night, Social Crediters drove to the Fort Saskatchewan Penitentiary, where the men were being held, to show their support. On February 11, 1938, the Alberta Legislative Assembly passed a resolution calling for the men's release.

Douglas reacted angrily to Powell's arrest, telling reporters that "whoever is instigating the proceedings is asking for a great deal of trouble, and is likely to get it." On December 10, 1937, he wrote to King explaining that he had been invited to Alberta to provide advice and asked if he would be risking arrest and deportation if he did so. King responded that as long as Douglas, unlike Powell, refrained from running afoul of the Criminal Code, he had nothing to fear.

The federal government announced Unwin's release on March 21, 1938, in an attempt by King to bolster his Liberals' chances in a federal by-election in Edmonton East the same day; the Liberals lost the by-election to Social Crediter Orvis A. Kennedy. Social Credit MLAs celebrated Unwin's return to the legislature with a snake dance on the floor of the Alberta legislature and chants of "For He's a Jolly Good Fellow" and "we want Powell". Powell was released in April and left Canada after being paid $4,000 (equivalent to $85,000 in 2025) by the Alberta government for his services. Upon his return to London, a meeting was organised for Powell to describe his experience to social credit advocates. Supporters of John Hargrave, a leader of the British social credit movement, disrupted the meeting to protest the structure of the British social credit movement.

On August 18, 1938, police magistrate Gibson, who had committed Unwin and Powell to stand trial, was dismissed from his role as Edmonton police magistrate by an Order in Council. The provincial government's executive branch, which issued the order, did not state a reason for the dismissal. Gibson believed this was retaliation for committing the two men to trial.

== Legacy ==
The publication of the pamphlet was part of an effort by the social credit movement to highlight the alleged conspiratorial influence of financial institutions. The movement hoped that incidents like this would cause the public to advocate to their political leaders in favour of social credit programs. Some members of the public did support the movement, but others were angered by the event and protested the government.

The incident was part of a series of events that decreased Aberhart's political influence in Alberta. Aberhart continued to struggle to pass legislation due to caucus revolts and constitutional challenges. Within the Social Credit caucus at the Alberta legislature, the incident discredited Powell and, by association, Douglas. Caucus members came to believe that Douglas's strategy of attacking the reputation of financial institutions, as demonstrated by the pamphlet, did not bring the province closer to implementing social credit policies. Aberhart used the incident to regain power from the Social Credit Board, separating the government from the board so that the latter became an independent institution with less influence over the former.

In 1937, the Alberta government passed the Accurate News and Information Act, which would compel newspaper publishers to disclose their sources and writers upon government request. Aberhart stated this was to ensure that publishers kept their "social responsibility" of avoiding the publication of defamatory statements. W. H. Kesterton, a professor at Carleton University, wrote that the Bankers' Toadies incident demonstrated that existing laws already gave protections against publishing abusive material, as Unwin and Powell were successfully convicted of defamation in this case. Therefore, according to Kesterton, laws strengthening protections against publishing defamatory statements were unnecessary. In the 1940 Alberta general election, Aberhart's government was reelected but with a reduced majority; his plans to implement tenets of the social credit economic system were postponed until after World War II, and he died in 1943 without implementing the system.
