= 1900 Canadian federal election =

- November 7, 1900

213 seats in the House of Commons 107 seats needed for a majority
- Turnout: 77.4% (▲14.5 pp)
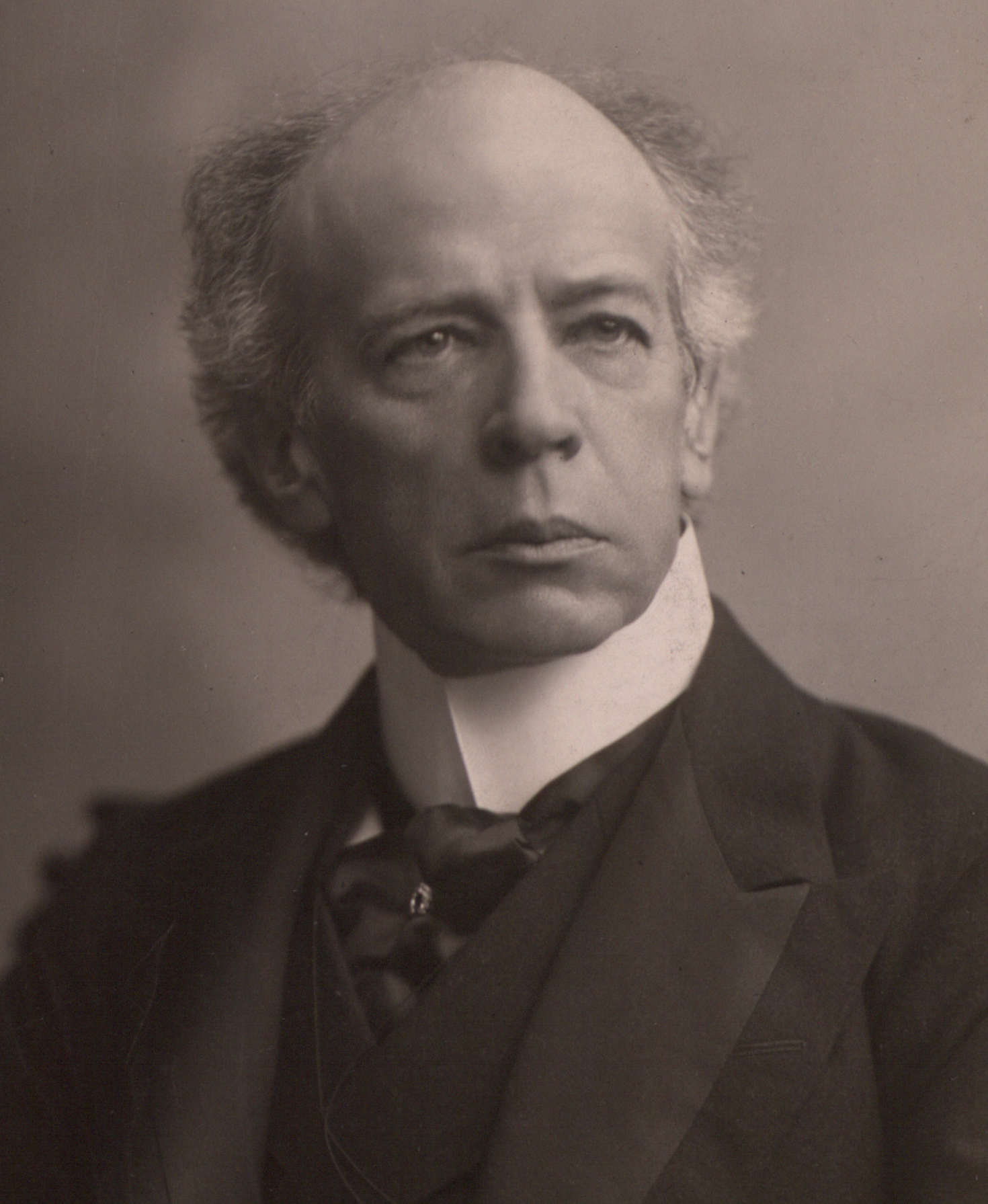

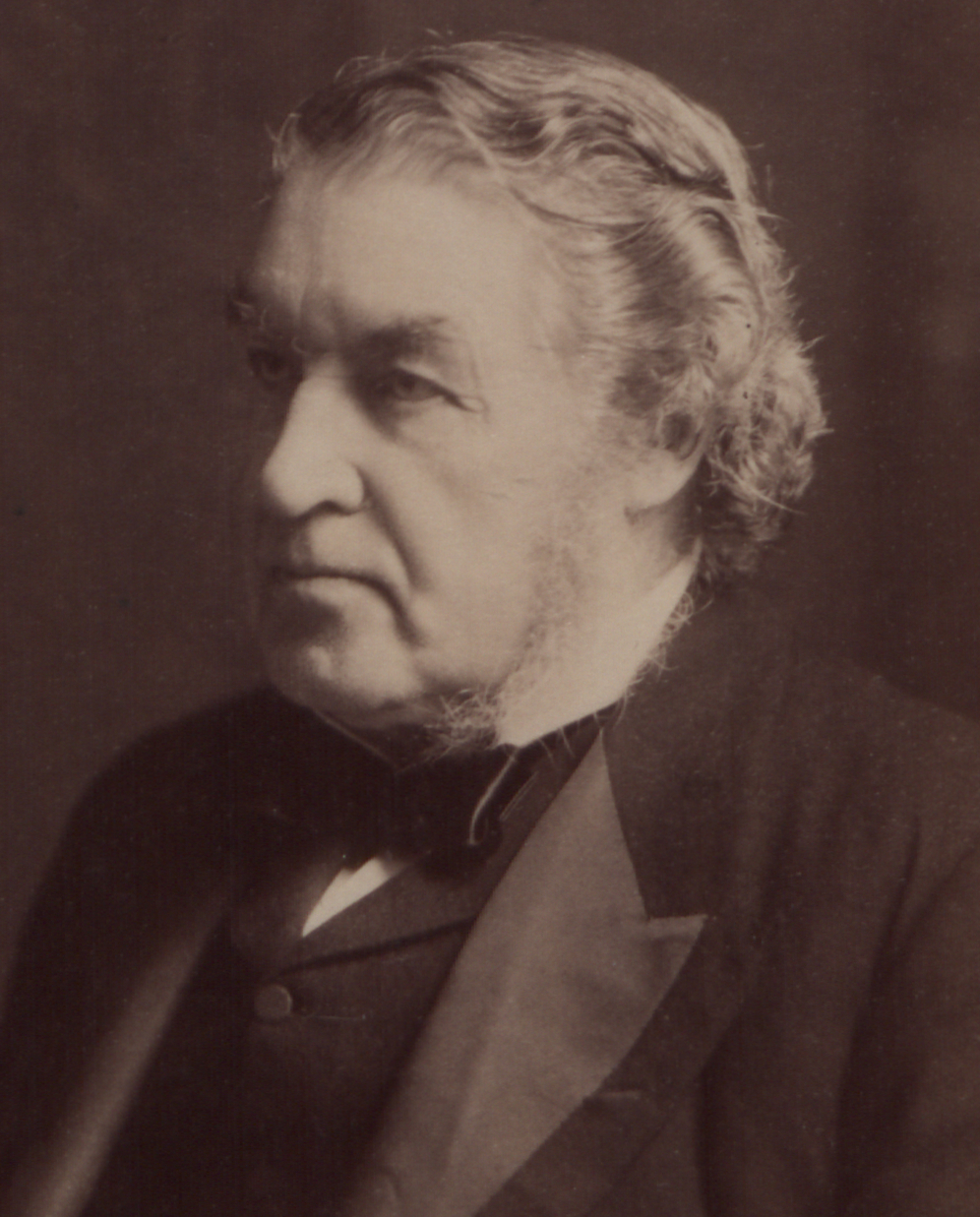
	First party	Second party
Leader	Wilfrid Laurier	Charles Tupper
Party	Liberal	Conservative
Leader since	June 2, 1887	May 1, 1896
Leader's seat	Quebec East	Cape Breton (lost re-election)
Last election	117 seats, 41.4%	86 seats, 48.2%
Seats won	128	79
Seat change	▲11	▼7
Popular vote	477,758	438,330
Percentage	50.3%	46.1%
Swing	▲8.9 pp	▼2.1 pp

- The Canadian parliament after the 1900 election
Prime Minister before election
Wilfrid Laurier
Liberal
Prime Minister after election
Wilfrid Laurier
Liberal

The 1900 Canadian federal election was held on November 7, 1900, to elect members of the House of Commons of Canada of the 9th Parliament of Canada. As a result of the election, the Liberal Party, led by Prime Minister Wilfrid Laurier, was re-elected to a second majority government, defeating the Conservative Party and Liberal-Conservatives led by Charles Tupper.

== National results ==

Party	Party leader	# of candidates	Seats			Popular vote		
Party	Party leader	# of candidates	1896	Elected	Change	#	%	Change
Liberal	Wilfrid Laurier	209	117	128^{1}	+9.4%	477,758	50.25%	+8.88pp
Conservative	Charles Tupper	193	83	69	-16.9%	410,953	43.22%	-1.18pp
Liberal-Conservative	Charles Tupper	11	15	10	-33.3%	27,377	2.88%	-0.89pp
Independent		12	1	3	+200%	13,307	1.40%	-0.03pp
Independent Conservative		4	4	1	-75%	10,081	1.06%	-0.20pp
Independent Liberal		3	1	1	-	4,895	0.51%	+0.27pp
Independent Labour		1^{2}	*	1	*	3,441	0.36%	*
Labour (People's Party)^{3}		3	*	-	*	2,924	0.31%	*
Unknown		1	-	-	-	27	x	-0.17pp
Total		437	229	213	-7.0%	950,763	100%	
Sources: http://www.elections.ca -- History of Federal Ridings since 1867

Notes:

* Party did not nominate candidates in the previous election.

x - indicates less than 0.005% of the popular vote.

^{1} Ralph Smith is reported to have run as an Independent Labour candidate in Vancouver. He was elected defeating both a Liberal and Conservative, but immediately joined the Liberal Party caucus when he took his seat in the House of Commons. Some records suggest that he ran as a Liberal in 1900. He was subsequently re-elected as a "Liberal" in 1904 and 1908, and was defeated in 1911. He is listed in these tables as having been elected as a Liberal.

^{2} Arthur Puttee of Winnipeg was elected as a Labour candidate in a 1900 by-election, and was re-elected as an Independent Labour MP in the subsequent 1900 election.

^{3} The Toronto Trades and Labour Council helped organize the People's Party and affiliated with the party for the 1900 federal election. Its political programme included shorter working hours, improved factory inspection, equal civil and political rights for women, national accident, unemployment and old-age insurance, and municipal ownership of gas, electricity, telephone and street-railway services. The party ran three labour candidates in Toronto who were poorly financed and ultimately lost their deposits, capturing only 4.7% of the local popular vote.

== Results by province ==
Party name		BC	NW	MB	ON	QC	NB	NS	PE	Total
Liberal	Seats:	4^{1}	4	2	34	57	9	15	3	128
Liberal	Popular vote (%):	49.1	55.1	42.9	46.7	56.3	51.9	51.7	51.8	50.3
Conservative	Seats:	2	-	3	47	8	3	5	1	69
Conservative	Vote (%):	40.9	44.9	35.3	44.9	43.6	35.6	44.9	39.4	43.2
Liberal-Conservative	Seats:				7		2	-	1	10
Liberal-Conservative	Vote (%):				3.8		8.1	3.4	8.8	2.9
Independent	Seats:			1	2	-	-			3
Independent	Vote (%):			13.5	1.7	0.2	0.3			1.4
Independent Conservative	Seats:				1		-			1
Independent Conservative	Vote (%):				1.7		4.2			1.1
Independent Liberal	Seats:				1					1
Independent Liberal	Vote (%):				1.1					0.5
Independent Labour	Seats:			1						1
Independent Labour	Vote (%):			8.2						0.4
Total seats		6	4	7	92	65	14	20	5	213
Parties that won no seats:
Labour	Vote (%):	10.0			0.1					0.3
Unknown	Vote (%):					xx				xx

Notes:

xx - indicates less than 0.05% of the popular vote.

== See also ==
- List of Canadian federal general elections
- List of political parties in Canada
- 9th Canadian Parliament
