= Manitoba Labour Party =

The Manitoba Labour Party (MLP) was a reformist, non-Marxist labour party in Manitoba, Canada. It was created in early May 1910 as a successor to the province's second Independent Labour Party (1906–08). Former Member of Parliament Arthur Puttee was a leading MLP organizer. The party fielded one candidate in the 1910 provincial election, and also ran candidates at the municipal level.

The party's founding convention declared that "the ultimate object of attainment shall be to preserve to the worker the full product of his toil". The ambiguity of this statement was criticized by the more radical Socialist Party of Canada (SPC), which called for collective ownership in industry.

After the SPC nominated candidates for Winnipeg North and Winnipeg West in the 1910 provincial election, the MLP sought to prevent confrontation and vote-splitting by fielding only one candidate of their own: Fred Dixon in Winnipeg Centre. Dixon was a moderate reformer, and campaigned in an unofficial alliance with the Manitoba Liberal Party. He was bitterly opposed by the SPC, which belatedly nominated W.S. Cummings to run against him as a spoiler.

Dixon lost to the Conservative Party incumbent, Thomas Taylor, by seventy-three votes. Cummings's ninety-nine votes may have made the difference in the outcome. The SPC was widely blamed for Dixon's loss, and became marginalized in Winnipeg's labour community for the next eight years.

The Manitoba Labour Party dissolved after the 1910 election. In 1912, its leaders formed the Manitoba Labour Representation Committee.

== Election results ==
Election	# of candidates nominated	# of seats won	# of total votes	% of popular vote	% in seats contested
1910	1	0	1,939		47.88

== See also ==
- List of Manitoba political parties
- Winnipeg Labour Party
- Labour candidates and parties in Canada
