= Manitoba Labour Representation Committee =

The Labour Representation Committee was a reformist labour organization in Manitoba, Canada, and was the ideological successor to the Winnipeg Labour Party, the first incarnations of the Independent Labour Party and the Manitoba Labour Party. It was founded in late 1912, and was based on a British organization of the same name.

The LRC cooperated with the Social Democratic Party of Canada in the municipal elections of 1913, and the two parties did not compete against each other in the 1914 provincial election. This was a marked contrast to the hostility which had previously existed between reformist labour groups and the Socialist Party of Canada (from which the SDPC had split).

The party's candidates in 1914 were W.J. Bartlett (Assiniboia) and R.S. Ward (Elmwood). These candidates placed third, behind their Conservative and Liberal opponents.

Fred Dixon ran in the 1914 provincial election. He was not a candidate of the LRC but sympathized with most of its goals and was from the same reformist tradition. Unofficially supported by many in the LRC, Dixon was elected as an independent member in a Winnipeg constituency.

For the provincial election of 1915, the LRC supported the two SDPC candidates in Winnipeg North, one of whom was successful (the district had two seats at the time. The LRC also supported William Bayley in Assiniboia. Bayley finished ahead of John Thomas Haig, the riding's Tory incumbent, but did not win, his vote tally falling 55 votes shy of Liberal John Wilton's total. Dixon again was elected as an independent, with backing from the LRC and the Liberal party.

The candidates nominated by the LRC in 1914-15 officially ran as "Independent Labour".

This organization dissolved after the election of 1915. Three years later, some of its supporters (including Dixon and Arthur Puttee) started the Dominion Labour Party in Winnipeg.
