= Independent Labour Party (Manitoba, pre-1920) =

Before World War I, there were at least three organizations in Winnipeg calling themselves the Independent Labour Party. The first of these was set up in 1895, and collapsed soon thereafter.

The second was created in 1906, following a visit to the city from Ramsay MacDonald. The party received support from members of Arthur Puttee's Winnipeg Labour Party, which had been moribund since 1904.

Like other groups of the same name, this Independent Labour Party was a reformist organization. It was opposed by members of the more radical Socialist Party of Canada.

The ILP nominated Kempton McKim to contest the riding of Winnipeg West in the provincial election of 1907. McKim called for labour standards legislation and the public ownership of utilities. He was defeated by Thomas Johnson, a popular figure from the left wing of the Liberal Party.

In 1908, some members agitated for the ILP to officially declare itself as socialist. They were opposed by another group, led by moderate reformer Fred Dixon (later a member of the provincial legislature). The controversy split the party, which ceased to exist as a viable organization after June 1908. The reformist faction of the ILP regrouped as the Manitoba Labour Party for the 1910 provincial election.

In 1914-15, candidates nominated by the Labour Representation Committee officially ran for the "Independent Labor Party", even though no formal organization of that name seems to have existed at the time.

J.S. Woodsworth helped launch a new Independent Labour Party in 1919. Shortly thereafter, he was elected as MP under that banner in 1921. This ILP went on to be one of the founding organizations of the Co-operative Commonwealth Federation party, a predecessor to the New Democratic Party.

== See also ==
- Canadian political parties
- Labour candidates and parties in Canada
- Independent Labour Party (Manitoba, 1920)
