= Winnipeg Labour Party =

Political party in Manitoba, Canada

The Winnipeg Labour Party was a reformist organization in Winnipeg, Manitoba, Canada, representing labour interests. Founded in 1896, it was based on an earlier Winnipeg organization known as the Independent Labour Party (which was influenced by the British party of the same name, but was not formally connected to any other group).

The party initially received support from both socialists and conservative trade unionists, and succeeded in electing Arthur Puttee to the House of Commons of Canada in the 1900 federal election. The WLP was hostile to radical militancy in the labour movement, however, and lost the support of many socialists in the years which followed.

The WLP nominated two candidates for the provincial election of 1903: William Scott in Winnipeg Centre and Robert Thoms in Winnipeg North. Both finished well behind their Conservative and Liberal opponents.

Puttee was defeated in the 1904 election, but he continued to promote labour causes in his newspaper, The Voice. In 1906, his organization was absorbed into another group calling itself the Independent Labour Party.

== See also ==
- List of Manitoba political parties
- Manitoba Labour Party
