= Joseph Unwin =

Canadian politician

Joseph Henry Unwin
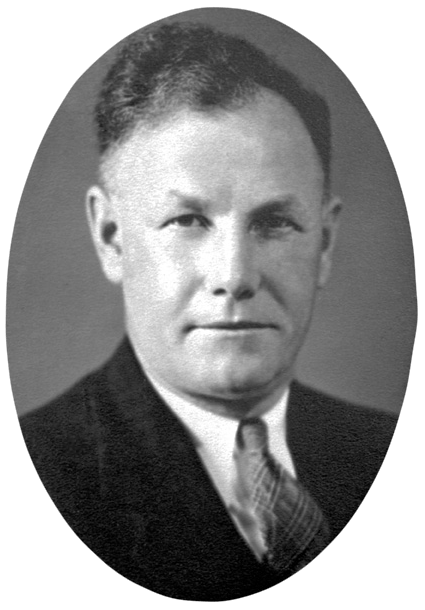

MLA for Edson
- In office 1935–1940
- Preceded by: Christopher Pattinson
- Succeeded by: Angus James Morrison

Personal details
- Born: September 15, 1892 England
- Died: January 4, 1987 (aged 94) Edmonton, Alberta, Canada
- Party: Social Credit

Joseph Henry Unwin (September 15, 1892 – January 4, 1987) was a politician from Alberta, Canada. He served in the Legislative Assembly of Alberta from 1935 to 1940 as a member of the Social Credit Party.

== 1935 election ==
Unwin ran in the 1935 Alberta general election as the Social Credit candidate in the electoral district of Edson. He defeated incumbent Labor Party member Christopher Pattinson and Liberal candidate J.S. Cowper.

The Alternative Voting system was in use to ensure majority representation. No candidate received majority on the First Count in the three-way race. The elimination of third place Labour candidate and incumbent MLA Chris Pattinson meant that about 700 votes were exhausted as they did not bear any back-up preferences. Unwin then was found to have a majority of votes still in play to win the seat.

Unwin's party formed the provincial government and he served as a backbencher in the Legislative Assembly.

== The "Bankers' Toadies" leaflet ==
In 1937 the Social Credit government was having problems in trying to implement its monetary policies. Premier William Aberhart, frustrated over increasing newspaper criticism, attempted to enact legislation that would have forced newspapers to print rebuttals to stories that the government found objectionable. As frustration rose, Unwin and government advisor George Powell created what became known as the "Bankers' Toadies" leaflet.

The leaflet, produced as an official publication of the Alberta government, urged members of the public to "exterminate" prominent bankers and politicians who were standing in the way of Social Credit monetary reform. Among those listed were Senator William Griesbach and Conservative Party leader David Milwyn Duggan.

Powell and Unwin were arrested and charged with libel and counseling murder. Their trial became known as the Bankers' Toadies trial. Unwin was convicted and sentenced to hard labor.

== Defeat ==
After the highly publicized trial, Unwin ran for a second term in the 1940 general election. He was defeated by Labor candidate Angus James Morrison. He did not return to provincial politics.
