= Grande Noirceur =

Historical period in Quebec

The Grande Noirceur (French pronunciation: [ɡʁɑ̃d nwaʁsœʁ]; English: Great Darkness) refers to the regime of conservative policies undertaken by the governing body of Quebec Premier Maurice Le Noblet Duplessis from 1936 to 1939 and from 1944 to 1959.

In today's historiography of Quebec (at least since the 1990s), some scholars express the opinion that the notion of Grande Noirceur was a myth invented by those who embraced or spearheaded the Quiet Revolution in the 1960s.

== Rural areas ==
Duplessis favoured rural areas over city development and introduced various agricultural credits during his first term. He also was noted for meagre investment in social services. Duplessis also opposed military conscription and Canadian involvement in World War II.

== Support from the Catholic Church ==
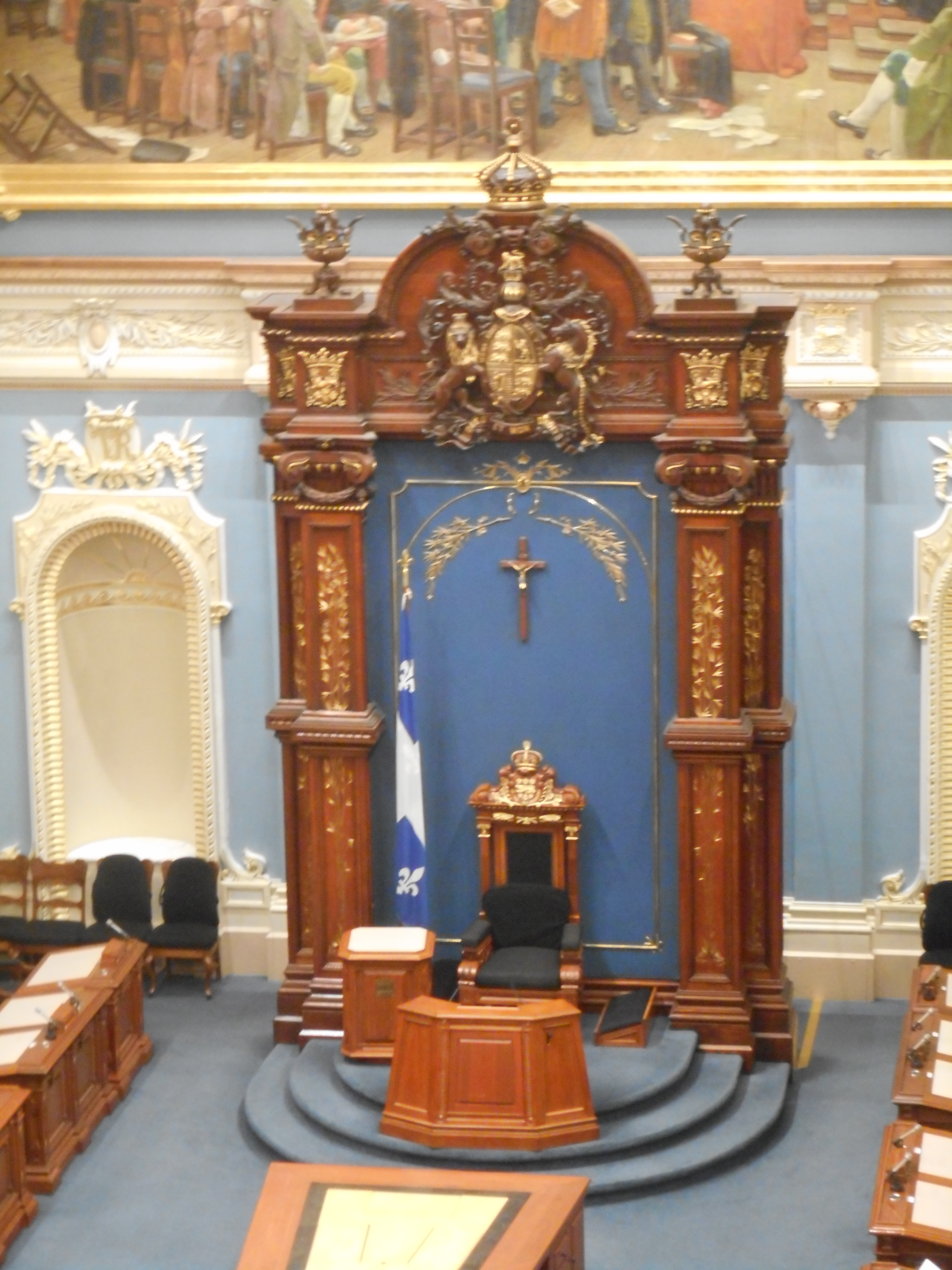
The crucifix at the National Assembly, 2014

In 1936, Duplessis hung a crucifix in the Quebec legislature. It was replaced by a second crucifix in 1982, which was only removed on 10 July 2019.

His party, the Union Nationale, often had the active support of the Catholic Church during political campaigns, using the slogan Le ciel est bleu; l'enfer est rouge ("Heaven is blue; hell is red"; red is the colour of the Liberal Party, and blue was the colour of the Union Nationale).

However, in the 1950s, labour strikes made many in the Church break with the Union Nationale and support the unions.

== Anti-communism ==
Duplessis championed anti-communism and opposed trade unions such as the Trades and Labour Congress of Canada (TLC). He introduced several laws opposed by the unions, most notably the Padlock Law, which prohibited the dissemination of communist propaganda "by any means whatsoever."

== Anti-unionism ==
In 1949, Duplessis also attempted to introduce a law modeled on the 1947 American Taft-Hartley Act to eliminate certain labour union rights established by the Labour Relations Law of 1944, which was Quebec's equivalent of the American Wagner Act of 1935. Duplessis's bill was withdrawn after fierce union opposition.

Duplessis later introduced a similar law in 1954, known as Bill 19, to force union groups to expel any communist supporter. Any group would lose its trade union accreditation if there was a single member with ties to communist organizations or who supported the ideology. The bill was so unpopular that it lost even the support of the conservative Catholic union group. That controversy forced the union to review its structure, which eventually led to the creation of the Confédération des syndicats nationaux (CSN).

== Labour strikes ==
His time in office was marked by significant labour strikes, such as the Dominion Textile in Valleyfield in 1946, the Asbestos Strike in Estrie, and the Murdochville copper mine strike in 1957. In those conflicts, Duplessis responded rapidly with force by using the provincial police to disperse picket lines and restore order, with several arrests. However, the Murdochville strike led to a major victory for union rights and provided the impetus and inspiration for other labour leaders to emerge and energized calls for labour rights.

== Roncarelli v. Duplessis ==
Duplessis actively opposed the Jehovah's Witnesses and once used his influence to revoke a liquor license owned by one of the religion's members. In Roncarelli v. Duplessis, that decision was overturned by the Supreme Court of Canada, and Duplessis was ordered to pay $33,123.53 in damages shortly before he died.

== Patronage and corruption ==
Duplessis' government was characterized by patronage and corruption, wielded against the Liberal opposition. He once proclaimed that a much-needed bridge at Trois-Rivières would not be built if a Liberal member was elected, and he kept his word while the opposition held the seat. In a rural district that had always elected a Liberal, the roads were kept unpaved, which obstructed commerce and so its residents decided in 1956 to vote for the Union Nationale as that was the only way to get their district noticed.

Duplessis was also accused of voter fraud. Contemporary rumours say that Union Nationale groups would arrive in rural towns armed with whiskey, food, and appliances in exchange for votes.

== Antisemitism ==
Another reason Duplessis won the 1944 Quebec general election was by appealing to antisemitic prejudices in Quebec by making the false claim in a violently antisemitic speech that the Dominion government together with the Godbout government had made a secret deal with the "International Zionist Brotherhood" to settle 100,000 Jewish refugees left homeless by the Holocaust in Quebec after the war in exchange for Jewish campaign contributions to both the federal and provincial Liberal parties.

By contrast, Duplessis claimed that he was not taking any money from the Jews, and if he were elected Premier, he would stop this plan to bring Jewish refugees to Quebec. To further push on the message, the Union Nationale handed out campaign pamphlets warning about the alleged plan to bring 100,000 Jewish refugees to Quebec, which featured a cartoon of the standard stereotype of an evil-looking, hook-nosed Jew handing bags of money to Godbout while in the background a vast horde of dirty, disreputable-looking, hook-nosed Jewish refugees were ready to descend on la belle province.

Though Duplessis's story about the plan to settle 100,000 Jewish refugees in Quebec was entirely false, his story was widely believed in Quebec, and ensured he won the election.
