= Accurate News and Information Act =

Statute passed by the Legislative Assembly of Alberta, Canada, in 1937

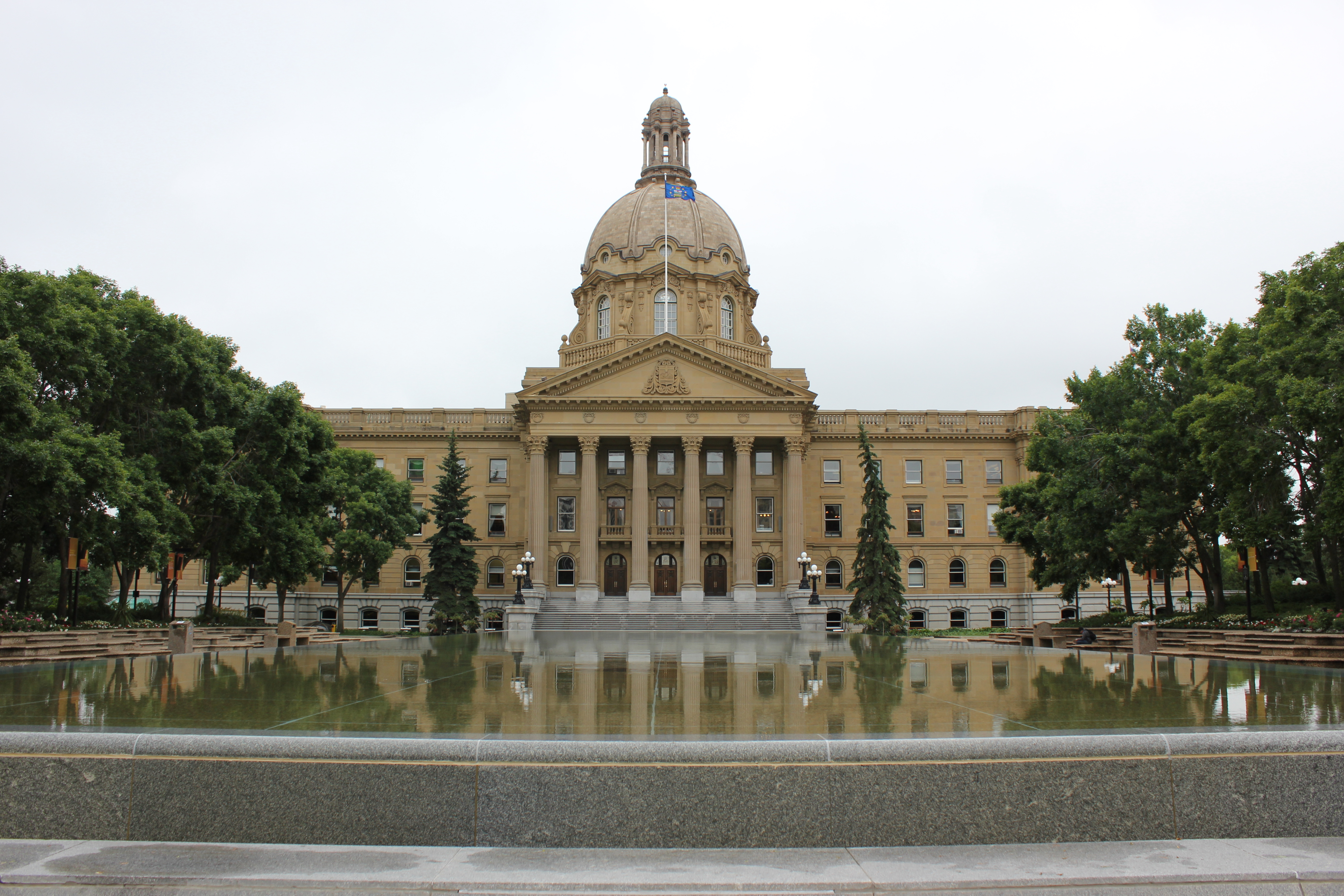

Legislative Assembly of Alberta
- Long title: An Act to Ensure the Publication of Accurate News and Information
- Considered by: Legislative Assembly of Alberta

Legislative history
- Introduced by: Solon Earl Low
- First reading: October 1, 1937
- Third reading: October 4, 1937
- Status: Struck down

The Accurate News and Information Act (complete title: An Act to Ensure the Publication of Accurate News and Information) was a statute passed by the Legislative Assembly of Alberta, Canada, in 1937, at the instigation of William Aberhart's Social Credit government. It would have required newspapers to print "clarifications" of stories that a committee of Social Credit legislators deemed inaccurate, and to reveal their sources on demand.

The act was a result of the stormy relationship between Aberhart and the press, dating to before the 1935 election, in which the Social Credit League was elected to government. Virtually all of Alberta's newspapers—especially the Calgary Herald—were critical of Social Credit, as were a number of publications from elsewhere in Canada. Even the American media had greeted Aberhart's election with derision.

Though the bill won easy passage through the Social Credit-dominated legislative assembly, the Lieutenant Governor of Alberta, John C. Bowen, reserved royal assent until the Supreme Court of Canada evaluated the act's legality. In 1938's Reference re Alberta Statutes, the court found that it was unconstitutional, and it never became law.

== Aberhart and the press ==
=== Before the 1935 election ===
William Aberhart's Social Credit League, running candidates for the first time, won a large majority in the 1935 Alberta election on the strength of promises to use a new economic theory called social credit to end depression conditions in the province. It did so against the almost uniform opposition of the news media. Some of the province's major newspapers were loyal to one of the traditional parties: the Edmonton Bulletin, for example, had supported the Liberals since its inception.

Aberhart initially laid out his economic agenda in only vague terms, and by early 1935 his opponents, including Premier Richard Gavin Reid of the United Farmers of Alberta, were trying to force him to commit to a specific plan. The Calgary Herald took up this call, going so far as to offer Aberhart a full page to lay out his approach in detail. Aberhart refused, on the grounds that he considered the Herald's coverage of him to be unfair. He frequently attacked the newspaper in speeches around the province, and on April 28 suggested that his followers boycott it and other unfriendly newspapers. The boycott was successful to the extent that it drove at least one newspaper out of business. The Herald responded to the boycott by asking "Is everyone opposed to the political opinions and plans of Mr. Aberhart to be boycotted? He has invoked a most dangerous precedent and has given the people of this province a foretaste of the Hitlerism which will prevail if he ever secures control of the provincial administration."

Shortly before the election, the Herald began to run cartoons by Stewart Cameron, a virulently anti-Aberhart cartoonist. The day before the election, it ran one featuring a car, labelled "the people", travelling along "Aberhart Highway No. 1" and arriving at a railway crossing. A train, labelled "common sense", was approaching from around the bend, along tracks labelled "fundamental facts". Aberhart leans out the "S.C. Signal Tower" advising the car "All's clear. Don't stop, look or listen."

Though the Herald was the most strident in its opposition to Aberhart and Social Credit, the Bulletin, the Edmonton Journal, the Medicine Hat News, the Lethbridge Herald, and many smaller papers all, in the words of Athabasca University historian Alvin Finkel, "attacked Social Credit viciously as a chimera which, if placed in power, would wreck Alberta's chances for economic recovery." Of the province's major papers, only the Calgary Albertan provided even lukewarm support.

So frustrated were the Social Crediters with the newspapers' hostility that in 1934 they founded their own, the Alberta Social Credit Chronicle, to spread their views. The Chronicle, in addition to acting as Aberhart's mouthpiece, carried guest editorials by such figures as British fascist leader Oswald Mosley and antisemitic priest Charles Coughlin.

=== Post-election ===
Media reaction to Social Credit's 1935 victory, in which it won 56 of 63 seats in the Legislative Assembly of Alberta, was almost uniformly negative. The Herald opined that "the people of Alberta have made a most unfortunate decision and may soon see the folly of it." Even the Albertan expressed its wish that social credit be first tried in "Scotland, or Ethiopia or anywhere but Alberta." Reaction across Canada was also negative; the St. Catharines Standard called the results "a nightmare that passeth all understanding" and the Montreal Star accused Albertans of voting for "an untried man and a policy whose workings he ostentatiously refused to explain before polling day." American newspapers were less restrained: the Chicago Tribune asked "Greetings to the Canadians. Who's loony now?" and the Boston Herald's headline screamed "Alberta goes crazy".

The relationship did not improve once Aberhart took office. In January 1935, H. Napier Moore wrote two articles for Maclean's casting doubt on Aberhart's honesty and his ability to follow through on his election promises. The American Collier's Weekly ran a profile that mocked Aberhart's appearance, taking note of his "vast colorless face" and his "narrow, left slanted mouth with soft, extra-heavy, bloodless lips which don't quite meet and through which he breathes wetly." Finkel, finding fault with both sides of the Aberhart-press feud, states

The major newspapers of the province opposed virtually everything the government did. Virtually every reform instituted was made to sound more draconian than it actually was. The conservative views of the owners and editors often interfered with the objective presentation of news reports, although perhaps not to the extent that the government claimed. In many cases, the papers simply concentrated on the very real chaos and confusion in government ranks and required few embellishments to make the government look bad.

The Herald lured Stewart Cameron away from working on Disney's Snow White and the Seven Dwarfs to make him its first ever staff cartoonist; Cameron devoted himself full-time to the ridicule of Aberhart. Though Social Credit staffer turned journalistic historian John Barr argues that the media's unswerving hostility to Aberhart may have benefited him politically by allowing him to "depict the press as a mere tool of Eastern financial and commercial interests", by January 1936 Aberhart was telling the listeners of his weekly gospel radio show that he was "glad there will be no newspapers in heaven."

To help combat the negative press, Aberhart resolved to gain control of the Albertan, the one paper of note to show him any support. He formed a company that acquired an option to purchase it, and used his radio program to promote the purchase of shares by Social Credit supporters. The other newspapers criticized him for using what was nominally a gospel program to promote stock sales. The plan came to naught, as most Social Credit supporters were too poor to buy newspaper stock, and the only interested buyers were beneficiaries of government patronage, chiefly liquor interests. Even so, the Albertan became the official organ of Social Credit, an editorial decision that doubled its circulation.

Aberhart reacted bitterly to the media's hostility. In a September 20, 1937, radio broadcast, he said of the press "these creatures with mental hydrophobia will be taken in hand and their biting and barking will cease." Four days later, a special session of the Legislative Assembly of Alberta opened, with the Accurate News and Information Act figuring prominently on its order paper. The bill would be introduced October 1, 1937, by Solon Earl Low and three days later would be passed by the legislature on October 4, 1937, during a marathon session which lasted until 12:30 the next morning.

== Statute ==
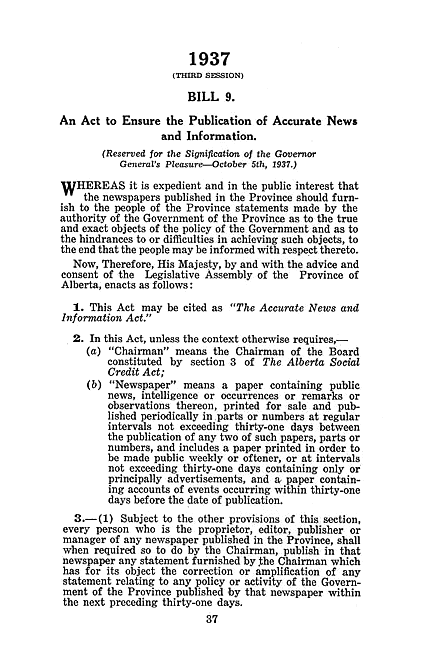
The Accurate News and Information Act, including a note about the Lieutenant-Governor's reservation

The 1937 Social Credit backbenchers' revolt had forced Aberhart to abdicate a portion of his power to the newly created Social Credit Board, which consisted of five Social Credit backbenchers charged with supervising a commission of experts. While the initial plan was to have this commission headed by C. H. Douglas, social credit's British founder, Douglas did not like Aberhart and did not view his approach to social credit as consistent with its true form. He refused to come. Instead, he sent two subordinates, L. D. Byrne and G. F. Powell. These surrogates were charged with recommending legislation to implement social credit in Alberta. Their first round of proposals, which included measures imposing government control on banks and prohibiting any person from challenging the constitutionality of any Alberta law in court without receiving the approval of the Lieutenant-Governor in Council, was disallowed by the federal government. The second round included the Accurate News and Information Act.

The act empowered the chair of the Social Credit Board to require a newspaper to reveal the names and addresses of its sources, as well as the names and addresses of any writers, including of unsigned pieces. Non-compliance would result in fines of up to $1,000 per day, and prohibitions on the publishing of the offending newspaper, of stories by offending writers, or of information emanating from offending sources. The act also required newspapers to print, at the instruction of the chair of the Social Credit Board, any statement "which has for its object the correction or amplification of any statement relating to any policy or activity of the Government of the Province."

The act was attacked by opposition politicians as evidence of the government's supposed fascism, and alienated even the Albertan. The international press was also cutting: one British paper referred to Aberhart as "a little Hitler". Later commentators have been no more favourable: Finkel calls the act evidence of the "increasingly authoritarian nature of the Aberhart regime", and even Barr, generally sympathetic to Social Credit, calls it "a harsh blow to free speech".

Lieutenant-Governor John C. Bowen, mindful of the federal government's disallowance of the Social Credit Board's earlier legislation, reserved royal assent of the act and its companions until their legality could be tested at the Supreme Court of Canada. This was the first use of the power of reservation in Alberta history, and in the summer of 1938 Aberhart's government announced the elimination of Bowen's official residence, his government car, and his secretarial staff. Aberhart biographers David Elliott and Iris Miller and Ernest Manning biographer Brian Brennan attribute this move to revenge for Bowen's reservation of assent.

== Aftermath ==
Bowen put a stop to the Accurate News and Information Act, at least temporarily, but Aberhart's fight against the press continued: on March 25, 1938, a resolution of the Social Credit-dominated legislature ordered that Don Brown, a reporter for the Edmonton Journal, be jailed "during the pleasure of the assembly" for allegedly misquoting Social Credit backbencher John Lyle Robinson on the inclusion of chiropractors in the Workman's Compensation Act. Brown was never actually jailed; the next day, in response to negative publicity from across Canada, the legislature passed another resolution, ordering "the release of Mr. Don C. Brown from custody." In Barr's view, "the government was made to look less ominous than silly."

Around the same time, the Supreme Court ruled on the Reference re Alberta Statutes. It found that the Accurate News and Information Act, along with the others submitted to it for evaluation, was ultra vires (beyond the powers of) the Alberta government. In the case of the Accurate News and Information Act, the court found that the Canadian constitution included an "implied bill of rights" that protected freedom of speech as being critical to a parliamentary democracy.

For its leadership in the fight against the act, the Pulitzer Prize committee awarded the Edmonton Journal a bronze plaque, the first time it honoured a non-American newspaper. Ninety-five other newspapers, including the Calgary Albertan, Edmonton Bulletin, Calgary Herald, Lethbridge Herald, and Medicine Hat News, were presented with engraved certificates.
