= Disallowance and reservation in Canada =

Constitutional concept in Canada

Disallowance and reservation are constitutional powers in Canada that act as a mechanism to delay or overrule legislation passed by Parliament or a provincial legislature. In contemporary Canadian history, disallowance is an authority granted to the King-in-Council (federal Cabinet) to invalidate an act (also called a "statute") passed by a provincial legislature. Reservation is an authority granted to the governor general or lieutenant governor to withhold royal assent from a bill which has been passed by Parliament or a provincial legislature, respectively; the bill is then "reserved" for consideration by the federal cabinet.

In Canadian constitutional law, the powers of reservation and disallowance of federal legislation formally are in section 55 and section 56 of the Constitution Act, 1867, and are extended to provincial legislation by section 90. (Note: The Constitution Act, 1982 renamed the British North America Act, 1867 to the Constitution Act, 1867.) The initial intent of disallowance, and its practice for the first few years of Confederation, was a means of ensuring parliament enacted legislation compliant with the constitution.

Between 1867 and 1942, when it had the power to do so, the Government of the United Kingdom disallowed one federal law. The government of Canada has disallowed 112 provincial laws, with the most recent instance occurring in 1943 when Alberta's law that limited land sales to Hutterites and other "enemy aliens" was invalidated. The power of reservation has been exercised 21 times by the governor general, all before 1878, and 70 times by various lieutenant governors, with the most recent case in Saskatchewan in 1961 when the lieutenant governor reserved assent on a bill related to mining contracts.

== General principles ==
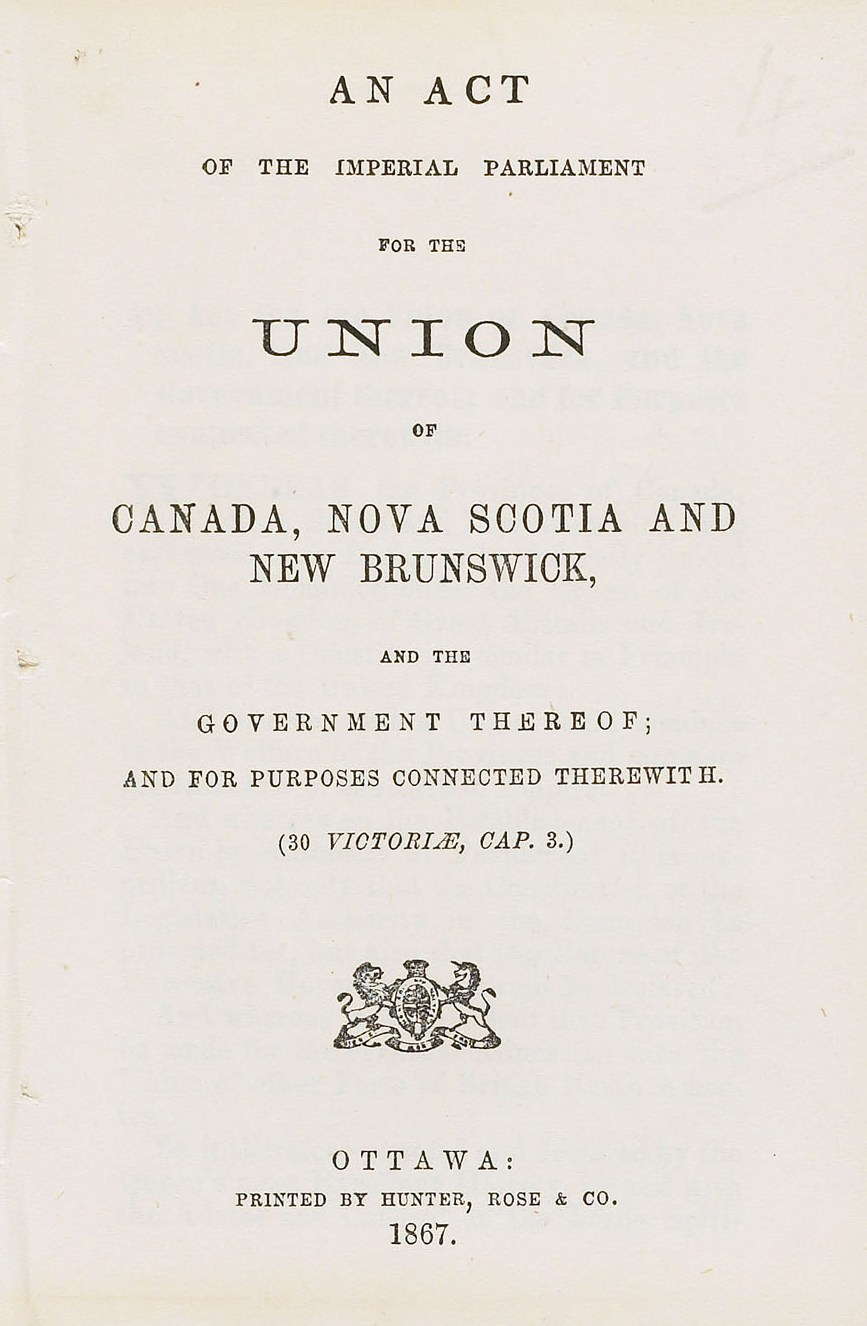
Front page of a copy of the British North America Act from 1867

Canada is a federation comprising the federal government, ten provincial governments and three territories. Federal and provincial authority is derived from the Constitution of Canada. The three territorial governments exercise powers delegated directly by statute of the federal Parliament. Each jurisdiction is generally independent from the others in its jurisdiction of legislative authority. The Constitution Act, 1867 sets out the division of powers between the federal government and the provincial governments.

In Canada, the representative of the King at the federal level is the Governor-General, while the representatives of the King in the provinces are the Lieutenant-Governors. Lieutenant-Governors are appointed by the Governor-General on the advice of the federal government. Collectively, the Governor-General and Lieutenant-Governors are referred to as viceregal representatives. The territorial equivalent to a Lieutenant-Governor is the Commissioner, who is the representative of the federal government in the territory.

Once a bill has passed through Parliament or a provincial legislature, the bill is presented to the Governor-General (or Lieutenant-Governor/Commissioner) for assent on the Sovereign's behalf.

=== Disallowance ===
Disallowance is the decision by a viceregal representative of the Crown to veto an act of the Parliament of Canada, or a provincial or territorial legislature, and the act ceases in legal effect upon disallowance. The authority to disallow an act of the federal Parliament is set out in section 56 of the Constitution Act, 1867, and was held by the Crown-in-Council. As part of the development of the modern Commonwealth of Nations, reforms from 1926 to 1931 recognized that constitutional convention dictated that the government of the United Kingdom was not capable of utilizing disallowance without the approval of the federal Cabinet.

Section 56: Where the Governor-General assents to a Bill in the Queen's Name, he shall by the first convenient Opportunity send an authentic Copy of the Act to One of Her Majesty's Principal Secretaries of State, and if the Queen-in-Council within Two Years after Receipt thereof by the Secretary of State thinks fit to disallow the Act, such Disallowance (with a Certificate of the Secretary of State of the Day on which the Act was received by him) being signified by the Governor General, by Speech or Message to each of the Houses of the Parliament or by Proclamation, shall annul the Act from and after the Day of such Signification.

The authority to disallow an act of a provincial legislature is set out in section 90 of the Constitution Act, 1867 and held by the Governor-General acting on the advice of the federal Cabinet (e.g., Governor-General-in-Council). The decision to disallow a provincial act must be made within one year of the Governor-General's receipt of the act from the lieutenant governor. In the territories the enabling acts establishing the territory extend this power to the requisite territory on the same terms as in the provinces.

Section 90: The following Provisions of this Act respecting the Parliament of Canada, namely, — the Provisions relating to Appropriation and Tax Bills, the Recommendation of Money Votes, the Assent to Bills, the Disallowance of Acts, and the Signification of Pleasure on Bills reserved, — shall extend and apply to the Legislatures of the several Provinces as if those Provisions were here re-enacted and made applicable in Terms to the respective Provinces and the Legislatures thereof, with the Substitution of the Lieutenant Governor of the Province for the Governor-General, of the Governor-General for the Queen and for a Secretary of State, of One Year for Two Years, and of the Province for Canada.

The power of disallowance is not retroactive, so any action lawfully done under an act's terms before the act has been disallowed remains legal. This principle is outlined in the Judicial Committee of the Privy Council decision in Wilson v. Esquimalt and Nanaimo Railway Co. following Sir Robert Borden's disallowance of an amendment to the Vancouver Island Settler's Rights Act passed by the British Columbia Legislature.

=== Reservation ===
Reservation is the withholding of royal assent by a viceregal representative from an act of the federal Parliament under section 55 of the Constitution Act, 1867, or an act of a provincial or territorial legislature under section 90 of the Constitution Act, 1867. In the federal context, this meant the Governor-General was formally instructed in certain circumstances to reserve a bill for the Sovereign's consideration, or may do so under their own discretion. That is, the Governor-General would neither assent nor refuse assent to the bill, but would instead refer it to the Secretary of State for the Colonies in the United Kingdom for consideration by the Imperial Privy Council; assent, if then given, would be by the Monarch-in-Council.

Section 55: Where a Bill passed by the Houses of the Parliament is presented to the Governor-General for the Queen's Assent, he shall declare, according to his Discretion, but subject to the Provisions of this Act and to Her Majesty's Instructions, either that he assents thereto in the Queen's Name, or that he withholds the Queen's Assent, or that he reserves the Bill for the Signification of the Queen's Pleasure.

=== Changing use ===
Today, the powers of disallowance and reservation, while still operative, have not been exercised since the 1940s federally and the 1960s provincially. They have never been used in the territories. Comparative public law scholar Richard Albert has argued that both powers have fallen into "constitutional desuetude", which occurs "when an entrenched constitutional provision loses its binding force upon political actors as a result of its conscious sustained non-use and public repudiation by preceding and present political actors". A similar view is shared by Canadian political scientist Andrew Heard who considers the powers reflecting the values of a "bygone era", and no longer align with the Canadian views of federalism. Canadian political scientist Peter H. Russell agrees that the powers have become politically "unusable" as Canadian understanding of federal–provincial relations has moved from a superior–subordinate relationship to one of equals who coordinate with each other.

This is a position contradicted by the deal reached to Patriate the Constitution of Canada, where then-Prime Minister Pierre Trudeau expressly included retaining the powers of reservation and disallowance in the final text in exchange for the creation of the Notwithstanding Clause.

== Federal acts ==
=== Disallowance of federal legislation ===
The power of disallowance and reservation for an act of the Parliament of Canada is provided to the King-in-Council (Privy Council of the United Kingdom) under section 56 of the Constitution Act, 1867. The only incidence of the King-in-Council using this authority occurred in 1873 when the Oaths Act, 1873 was disallowed. The Parliament of Canada passed the Oaths Act, 1873 in the aftermath of the Pacific Scandal and would have permitted parliamentary committees to examine witnesses under oath, which was not permissible under the British North America Act. The Parliament of the United Kingdom recognized the importance of this issue and passed the Parliament of Canada Act, 1875 which amended section 18 of the British North America Act to provide the Canadian Parliament with the same privileges afforded the Parliament of the United Kingdom, including the authority to examine witnesses under oath. The Canadian Parliament subsequently passed a new Oaths Act.

Political scientist Andrew Heard argues that disallowance of federal law has been effectively forbidden by constitutional convention in Canada since 1942 when the Governor General was no longer permitted to forward Acts of the Canadian Parliament to the government of the United Kingdom.

The Constitution Act, 1867 stipulates that the government of the United Kingdom has two years to disallow a law after receiving an official copy of it. However, Canada no longer sends copies of legislation passed by Parliament to the United Kingdom, so an Act of the Canadian Parliament cannot be disallowed under section 56 because it cannot be received by the British government. This convention was further strengthened first by the Letters Patent, 1947, which eliminated the Governor General's obligation to send official copies of laws to the government of the United Kingdom; and secondly by the repeal of The Publication of Statutes Act shortly afterwards.

=== Reservation of federal legislation ===
Between 1867 and 1878, twenty-one federal bills were reserved, six of which were denied Royal Assent by the government of the United Kingdom, and no bills have been reserved since. The 1887 Colonial Conference passed a non-binding resolution stating the governor general of a Dominion nation would never use the power of reservation on the instructions of the government of the United Kingdom. These Royal Instructions were related to legislation governing eight subjects: authorizing divorce, conferring anything of value to the governor general, creating a new legal tender, committing Canada to an international treaty inconsistent with a British treaty, or containing provisions that were previously disallowed. In 1876, minister of justice Edward Blake wrote the Secretary of State for Colonies, requesting greater independence, and specifically that Britain would not use the power of reservation. Subsequently, the seventh paragraph of the Royal Instructions was repealed in 1878 on the insistence of Blake, and jurist Gérard La Forest notes that the concept of British control over provincial legislatures was largely forgotten, and the power of reservation was not used by the government of the United Kingdom again.

In 1931, the Statute of Westminster removed the power of the Parliament of the United Kingdom to create laws that impacted the dominions, unless the dominions specifically asked for it. This Statute effectively eliminated the obligation for certain laws created by the Canadian Parliament to be reserved by the governor general for the approval of the government of the United Kingdom.

== Provincial acts ==
=== Disallowance of provincial legislation ===
The power of disallowance of an act of a provincial legislature is outlined in the Constitution Act in sections 55 and 90, with the authority resting with the governor general in council. Sections 55 and 90 of the British North America Act does not specify whether the authority rests with the governor general or the governor general in council (e.g., federal cabinet). However, the opinion that the authority rests with the governor general in council was affirmed by Earl Granville, Secretary of State for the Colonies in 1869, and later again affirmed in 1879 by Justice Jean-Thomas Taschereau in Lenoir v. Ritchie, and once again by the Supreme Court in the 1938 Reference re Disallowance and Reservation.

The process for disallowance of an act of a provincial legislature begins after the bill has passed third reading in the legislature and the lieutenant governor has granted royal assent. The Constitution Act requires the lieutenant governor to send a copy of every act of the legislature which has been granted royal assent to the Governor General. For a period of up to one year from receipt of a copy of the act, the governor general in council may disallow the legislation. The Constitution Act does not provide a specified period of time for the lieutenant governor to forward a copy of each provincial act to the federal government. Instructions were first provided in 1892 which gave the lieutenant governor ten days after royal assent to forward the act to the Secretary of State for Canada. These federal timelines were often not followed, and lieutenant governors generally preferred to transmitting all the statutes of a legislative session together. In 1950, the federal government amended the requirements for transmission of provincial act to allow the lieutenant governor to send copies at the adjournment of the legislature.

Disallowance of an act of a provincial legislature by the Governor General in Council is facilitated through an Order in Council. The Order in Council is sent to the lieutenant governor of the province with the receipt for the day the provincial act was received by the Governor General. In accordance with sections 56 and 90 of the Constitution Act, the lieutenant governor must advise the legislature of the disallowance, either by speech, message, or proclamation. The act is officially annulled and no longer a valid law on the day the lieutenant governor advised the legislature of the disallowance.

Since Confederation in 1867, 112 provincial acts have been disallowed by the government of Canada, with the last occurrence in 1943 invalidating Alberta's legislation restricting land sales to Hutterites and other "enemy aliens".

=== Reservation of provincial legislation ===
The process for reservation of a provincial act by the lieutenant governor begins following the bill passing third reading in the legislature and being forwarded to the lieutenant governor for royal assent. The lieutenant governor has three options: they may grant royal assent, withhold royal assent on the instructions of the governor general in council, or reserve the bill for approval by the governor general. A bill that is reserved by the lieutenant governor does not become law unless it is granted royal assent within one year of passage. The lieutenant governor is provided "unrestricted" authority to reserve legislation based on the lieutenant governor's discretion, except as instructed by the governor general in council.

Since Confederation, 70 bills passed by a provincial legislature have had royal assent reserved by a lieutenant governor, (Note: Gérard La Forest notes there have been 69 bills reserved by publishing of his book in 1955, the 70th bill was reserved by the lieutenant governor of Saskatchewan in 1961.) of which 14 bills of a provincial legislature have been granted royal assent by the governor general. (Note: La Forest notes there have been 13 reserved bills to receive royal assent by the governor general by publishing of his book in 1955, the 14th bill was reserved by the lieutenant governor of Saskatchewan in 1961 and subsequently granted royal assent.)

== History ==
In his book Disallowance and Reservation of Provincial Legislation, published by the Department of Justice, future Supreme Court justice Gérard La Forest divided the history of Canada following Confederation into five periods based on the use of disallowance: 1867 to 1881, 1881 to 1896, 1896 to 1911, 1911 to 1924, and from 1924 until the time at which he wrote in 1954. The periods generally correspond to changes in the governing party of Parliament or prime minister.

=== 1867–1881: Macdonald and Mackenzie ===
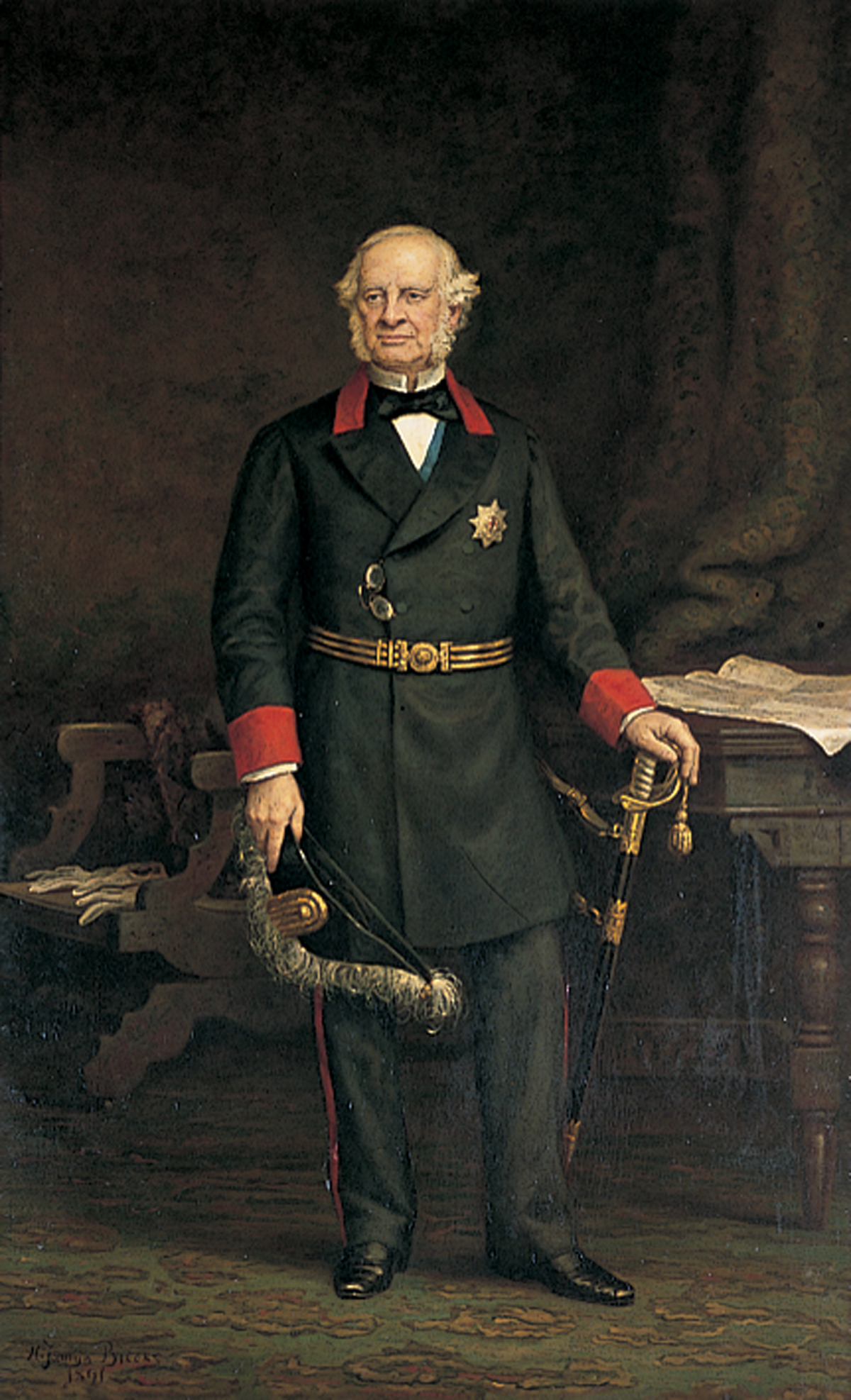
Earl Granville affirmed the power of disallowance rested with the federal cabinet.

The first period of disallowance and reservation was the period immediately following Confederation of Canada under Prime Ministers Sir John A. Macdonald and Alexander Mackenzie from 1867 until 1881. During this period many of the invalid provincial acts were those which encroached on federal constitutional responsibilities. The second most common grounds where there is a conflict between federal policies and interests is the most common reason for disallowance. From 1867 to 1881, the governor general disallowed 27 provincial acts, of which 25 were considered ultra vires of the powers of the provincial Legislatures. La Forest notes that when the minister of justice found an ultra vires provision that was useful or of little importance, they generally communicated their concerns to the Legislature rather than use the power of disallowance. Macdonald was hesitant to disallow acts that he disagreed with, were petitioned against, or were otherwise disagreeable without a strong legal rationale, a view shared by Liberal successors as Minister of Justice Edward Blake and Rodolphe Laflamme. Macdonald's view on disallowance changed after 1881, as his government disallowed a growing number of provincial acts. For instance, Macdonald did not disallow the 1870 act of the Ontario Legislature that amended the will of George Jervis Goodhue against the wishes of the trustees and other parties, as Macdonald viewed the Legislature as having the authority to pass this legislation.

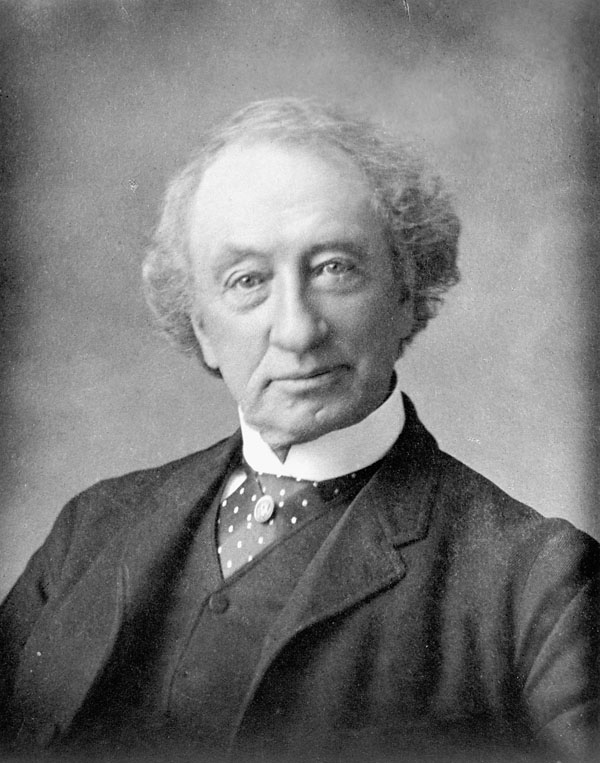
John A. Macdonald, Canada's first Prime Minister and Minister of Justice, developed the original principles of disallowance.

Following Confederation in 1867, the Dominion government began the process of interpreting the new British North America Act and determining the responsibilities of each level of government. Parliament passed the Department of Justice Act in 1868, which gave the Minister of Justice the responsibility to examine provincial legislation. Prime Minister John A. Macdonald held the position of Minister of Justice and shortly after the passing of the Department of Justice Act brought forward to Cabinet a report on June 8, 1868, approved as Order in Council P.C. 1868-0611 describing the role of the Department of Justice and Government of Canada when utilizing the powers of disallowance and reservation. Macdonald's Order in Council outlined four reasons disallowance would be considered by the department of justice for a provincial act: the act as a whole is illegal or unconstitutional; the act is illegal or unconstitutional in part; in areas of shared federal–provincial jurisdiction the act clashes with an Act of Parliament; or the act affects the interests of the Dominion negatively. Macdonald's Order in Council also required that the department of justice complete a report on the offending provincial act that included the reasons why disallowance was necessary. Macdonald followed his own recommendations closely and produced a report each year listing the provincial acts he did not find objectionable, and a separate report of the provincial acts he found objectionable based on the criteria in the Order in Council. Macdonald's Order in Council also recommended that the minister of justice communicate with the province of an offending act to seek a solution before utilizing the power of disallowance. La Forest notes that despite a report stating that a provincial act was considered by the minister of justice to be not objectionable, there were instances where those acts were disallowed. While minister of justice, Macdonald actively drafted these legislative reports with his deputy minister Hewitt Bernard, however the successor Liberal minister of justice Antoine-Aimé Dorion authored his own reports. Dorion's successor Télesphore Fournier had Bernard draft the reports and merely wrote that he concurred on the report.

The first act to be disallowed by the Macdonald government was An Act to empower the Police Court in the City of Halifax to sentence Juvenile Offenders to the Halifax Industrial School passed by the Nova Scotia Legislature in 1868. The act was disallowed in August 1869 as it dealt with criminal law, which was within the exclusive constitutional jurisdiction of the federal government.

In 1871, a question arose concerning the powers of the governor general, Canadian Cabinet and Parliament following the New Brunswick Legislature passing the Common Schools Act of 1871, which abolished church-run schools, and compelled Catholics to financially contribute to the replacement system of government-run public schools called Common Schools. A majority of the House of Commons attempted to pass a resolution to disallow the act, while Macdonald's Cabinet did not intend to use disallowance. Macdonald viewed the legislation as within the exclusive jurisdiction of the provincial legislature under section 93 of the British North America Act, Macdonald also viewed the New Brunswick government under Premier George Edwin King as friendly to his interests. Lord Ripon, the President of the Imperial Privy Council, refused to take action to disallow the act at the request of Parliament, and responded by affirming that the power of disallowance of provincial acts is held by the governor general acting on the advice of Canadian Cabinet. The controversy over the New Brunswick Common Schools Act did not fade away as the New Brunswick Legislature was emboldened to pass more provisions strengthening the provisions of the act, and a second resolution for disallowance was passed by the Parliament of Canada in 1873. Macdonald spoke out against Parliament's authority to disallow acts, and Secretary of State for the Colonies Lord Kimberley responded to Parliament further reinforcing that disallowance was the responsibility of Canadian Cabinet and the governor general, much to the disappointment of the Liberal members and Edward Blake who moved the resolution. Macdonald allowed the Common Schools Act to stand, and it was subsequently affirmed in its validity by the Judicial Committee of the Privy Council decision in Maher v Town Council of Portland.

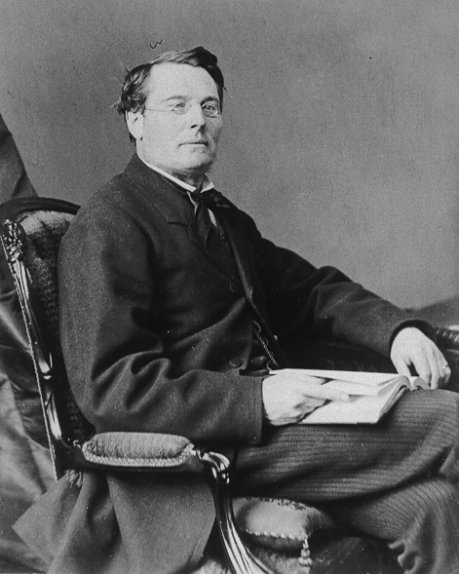
Edward Blake as Minister of Justice (1875–1877) was highly influential in convincing the government of the United Kingdom to remove provisions advising the governor general to reserve acts of Parliament.

The first session of the 1st Canadian Parliament saw two bills passed on May 22, 1868, and subsequently reserved by Governor General Charles Monck. An Act to fix the Salary of the Governor General reduced the salary of the governor general from $10,000 to $6,500 which was not granted and was not recommended for royal assent by the governor general or by the Secretary of State for the Colonies, the Duke of Buckingham. The second bill, An Act respecting the Treaty between Her Majesty and the United States of America for the apprehension and surrender of certain offenders received royal assent in June and subsequently became law.

Macdonald considered the question of whether the governor general or the government of the United Kingdom would consider a provincial bill reserved by a lieutenant governor due to inconsistency with Royal instructions. Macdonald consulted Lord Granville, who advised that matters of imperial interest were the purview of the government of the United Kingdom, and the governor general could not provide royal assent to those bills, and this advice was formalized in a July 1869 Order in Council directing lieutenant governors to follow Royal instructions and reserve bills which did not align with those instructions. Royal instructions were related to legislation governing eight subjects: authorizing divorce, conferring anything of value to the governor general, creating a new legal tender, committing Canada to an international treaty inconsistent with a British treaty, or contain provisions that were previously disallowed. In 1876, the minister of justice Blake wrote the Secretary of State for Colonies requesting greater independence, and specifically requesting that Britain would not use the power of reservation. Subsequently, the seventh paragraph of the Royal instructions were repealed in 1878 on the insistence of Blake. La Forest notes that the concept of British control over provincial legislatures was largely forgotten, and the power of reservation was not used by the government of the United Kingdom again. Albert notes that the additional autonomy provided to Canada made it the most independent British colony, and later in 1878, Parliament passed legislation regarding divorce, a previously forbidden topic without repercussions. As early as 1873, the federal government under Macdonald advised lieutenant governors not to reserve bills which were firmly within the provincial powers to legislate, but were advised to reserve bills if the act conflicted with Dominion policy, imperial policy, or were ultra vires. This policy continued with successive ministers of justice. Despite this policy, lieutenant governors continued to reserve bills within the provincial constitutional domain and at times the governor general would have to provide royal assent. However, one instance where Macdonald did not recommend for royal assent was a reserved Ontario bill incorporating the Orange Order. Macdonald thought the bill was a political trap by Ontario premier and rival Oliver Mowat, that would either alienate his support with Catholics in Quebec or Protestants in Ontario. Instead of recommending royal assent, Macdonald recommended the Ontario Legislature pass the bill again, which it did, and the lieutenant governor provided royal assent.

=== 1881–1896: Macdonald, Abbot, Thompson, Bowell and Tupper ===
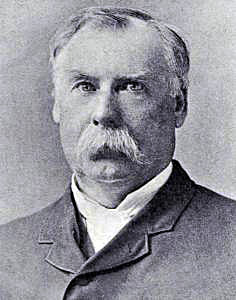
Peter McLaren requested disallowance of the Ontario Rivers and Streams Act, 1881 to serve his own business interests.

The second period of disallowance and reservation came in 1881 which saw thirty-eight acts disallowed. The change in disallowance policy that separates this period came with the disallowance of An Act for Protecting the Public Interests in Rivers, Streams and Creeks passed by the Ontario Legislature. La Forest believes the report issued by justice minister James McDonald was actually authored by John A. Macdonald, as McDonald ceased his role as justice minister only a few days after its publication. The Ontario act was based on a disagreement between two logging firms, one of which owned by prominent Conservative Peter McLaren had built dams and other infrastructure on creeks to make it easier to float logs down, and another company sought to use the creek without the permission of the first company. The act gave the right to individuals to float logs down rivers, creeks, and streams, and allowed those who made improvements along a river to receive a toll set by the lieutenant governor from others floating logs down a river. The report on disallowance cited removal property rights from individuals down river who would be forced to become "toll-keeper against his will", which amounted to taking away the "rights of one man and vest them in another"; the report deemed a Legislature's power to do so "exceedingly doubtful". The decision to disallow the act went against the principles of Macdonald's 1868 report, and was protested by the Premier of Ontario Oliver Mowat and opposition in Parliament, including Wilfrid Laurier. Further accusations came from the opposition claiming the decision was motivated, as the individual who petitioned for disallowance was a known political friend of Macdonald. The Conservative government was unsuccessful at arguing that this disallowance aligned with previous decisions, and Conservative Dalton McCarthy conceded in Parliament that the disallowance was based on a new principle. Macdonald defended the decision on the concept of protecting property rights and it was within the general interest of the Dominion to maintain those rights to ensure continued certainty in investment. The Ontario Legislature protested the disallowance and passed the same Act three more times, all of which were disallowed, and finally the fourth attempt in 1884 which was not disallowed and continued as law. The issue was settled in the landmark case McLaren v Caldwell by the Judicial Committee of the Privy Council.

Following the disallowance of the Ontario act, the minister of justice was inundated with petitions to disallow further acts; La Forest notes that Alexander Campbell, who held the role from 1881 to 1885, studied each petition thoroughly, but only disallowed Ontario's further attempts to pass the Rivers and Streams Acts. Campbell's successor as justice minister Sir John Thompson refused to recommend disallowance for acts that interfered with property rights similar to the Ontario act in 1881. La Forest notes that Thompson's actions as justice minister were at times inconsistent, disallowing some acts and refusing to recommend disallowance for similar reasons. Thompson was also very willing to indicate in his reports where he saw an injustice had taken place, and whether or not the injustice was sufficient reason for the act to be disallowed. Following Thompson, Conservative justice ministers Sir Charles Hibbert Tupper, Thomas Mayne Daly, and Arthur Rupert Dickey refused to disallow an act solely on the basis that it was unjust.

During this period, the government of British Columbia passed two acts restricting immigration of Chinese individuals to the province, and permitting the arrest of new immigrants without a warrant; the acts, both titled An Act to prevent the Immigration of Chinese, were disallowed. The British Columbia government had previously lobbied the federal government to require the Canadian Pacific Railway to hire labourers from Europe for railway construction instead of individuals of Chinese descent, and dissatisfied with progress made by the federal government on immigration, British Columbia attempted to regulate immigration under section 95 of the British North America Act. Minister of Justice Campbell rejected the argument, noting provinces could encourage immigration, but not prohibit immigration, and subsequently disallowed the act. Macdonald relented to requests to evaluate the Chinese immigration and appointed the Royal Commission on Chinese Immigration in 1885, which recommended a head tax on Chinese immigrants. The government of British Columbia did not see the recommendations of the Royal Commission as sufficient, and passed legislation duplicating the previous act limiting Chinese immigration to the province, which was subsequently disallowed by the federal government.

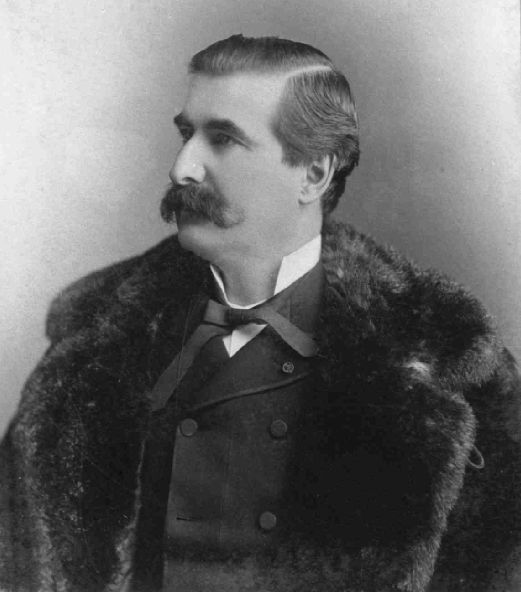
Honoré Mercier, Premier of Quebec, organized the first meeting of provincial premiers in 1887 in opposition to the powers of disallowance and reservation.

Another common theme for disallowance during the period of 1881–1896 was provincial acts that conflicted with Dominion policy, most of which were outside of the powers of the provincial legislatures. Nearly half of the 38 acts disallowed during this period were because the acts interfered with Dominion railway policy. Macdonald disallowed 13 railway charters issued by the fledgling provincial government of Manitoba between 1882 and 1887. the Manitoba government under Premier John Norquay felt that high freight rates were caused by the Canadian Pacific Railway's monopoly, and sought to construct railways connected to the United States border. However, the Macdonald government had previously provided a monopoly to the Canadian Pacific Railway, not permitting any east–west line to be built south of the Canadian Pacific line in Western Canada, this was to protect Canadian Pacific from competition, and support Macdonald's National Policy. Ten of the disallowed acts infringed on the Canadian Pacific monopoly directly by chartering competing companies, while two other acts generally promoted railway construction in Manitoba against the interests of the federal government. James R. Mallory notes the successive disallowances by Macdonald for the Manitoba railway charters hampered what should have been an alliance between Conservatives Macdonald and Norquay. Norquay subsequently lost the confidence of his party and resigned in 1887, and the Manitoba Liberal Party under Thomas Greenway took power in the 1888 election. Soon afterward, the Canadian Pacific Railway monopoly was removed in exchange for a financial bailout by the Macdonald government.

Provincial governments were not pleased with what they saw as the increasing interference of the federal government in provincial autonomy, and held the first Interprovincial Conference in Quebec City in October 1887 to discuss the issue; the meeting site was symbolic as it had previously hosted the 1864 Conference that laid the basis for the British North America Act. Amongst the issues discussed at the conference was the removal of the federal power of disallowance. Quebec Premier Honoré Mercier spoke of it as an unnecessary power and claimed that issues of constitutionality of laws "fall[] naturally within the jurisdiction of the courts". Manitoba Premier Norquay, frustrated by repeated disallowance of railway charters, also challenged the federal powers. The 1887 conference passed two resolutions, one calling for amendments to the British North America Act removing the power of disallowance over topics within the provincial sphere of section 92, and a second resolution calling on the federal government to seek a judicial opinion on each case of disallowance, which would be open to appeal. Macdonald and the federal government were invited to the conference but chose not to attend, the Macdonald's allies in the governments of British Columbia and Prince Edward Island also declined to attend. No action was taken on the first resolution, but Parliament led by a motion by Edward Blake moved to permit the governor general to provide the option to refer these matters to the court for an opinion in 1890, but without the right of an appeal.

Macdonald's government changed its view on reservation, and in November 1882 created a new standard for reservation to prevent situations of reservation by lieutenant governors on the advice of provincial cabinet. However, these standards do not appear to have been forwarded to lieutenant governors until 1887. The new instructions reiterated that lieutenant governors authority for reservation was to be exercised as Dominion officers accountable to the governor general, not provincial cabinet, and further outlined a policy where the federal government preferred to deal with provincial acts through disallowance if necessary, not reservation. The practice of lieutenant governors reserving bills without instruction from the governor general continued, and was often met with the governor general reiterating this policy back to the lieutenant governor. La Forest notes that fewer bills were reserved after 1882, and those that were reserved did not receive assent from the governor general. Instead, the federal government referred the bills back to the respective legislature to be passed again.

=== 1896–1911: Laurier ===
The Liberal victory under Sir Wilfrid Laurier in the 1896 Canadian federal election brought major changes to the use of disallowance by the federal government. In the years prior to the 1896 election, Laurier had made it clear he would not intervene in matters within provincial jurisdiction, unless the matters intervened with federal policy, and was not supportive of disallowance in circumstances where the act was "unjust". During this period, thirty acts were disallowed, twenty-one of which were passed by the British Columbia Legislature; however, no act was disallowed on the grounds of injustice or inexpediency. Laurier's ideals on federalism and the supremacy of provincial legislatures in constitutionally defined areas was shared by his ministers of justice Oliver Mowat, David Mills, Sir Charles Fitzpatrick, and Allen Bristol Aylesworth. Instead the federal government under Laurier cautioned legislatures on instances where laws could be considered unjust, but left the matter to be resolved in the legislature or courts. Despite this supportive view of federalism, the Laurier government had no hesitancy on using disallowance in circumstances where an act conflicted with Dominion policy. The Laurier government disallowed laws passed by the British Columbia Legislature which adversely affected immigrants from Asia, as they conflicted with Dominion policy, but also could effect imperial interests and relations between the United Kingdom and Japan. Imperial interests were also recognized in the disallowance of the Ontario Chartered Accountants Act which the British Colonial Office petitioned as it prevented the English Institute of Chartered Accountants from using a title they had under British law. Provincial acts which were considered ultra vires that were seen to not cause considerable harm were not disallowed, and left to the legislature and courts.

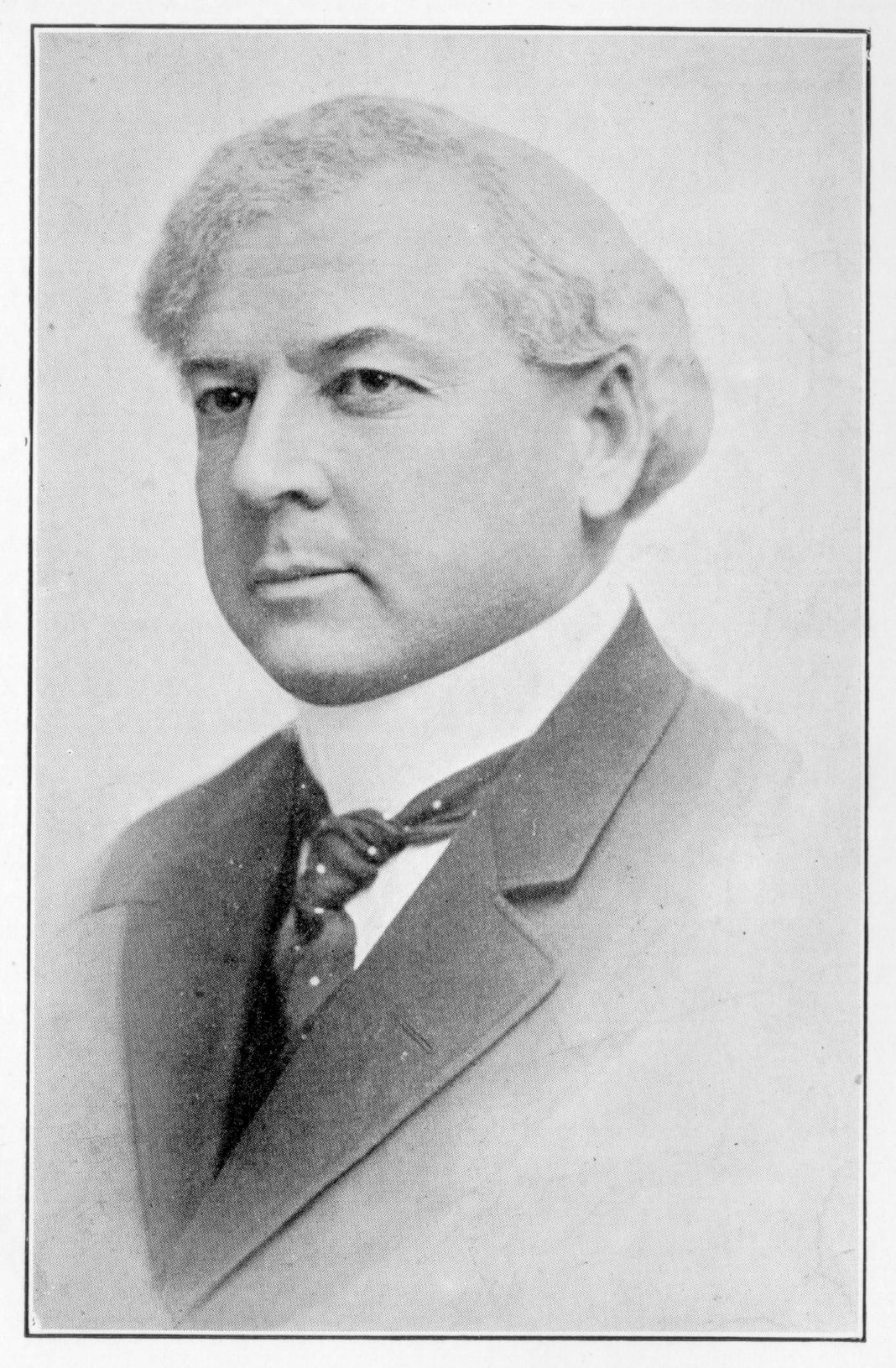
The British Columbia Legislature under Premier Richard McBride passed a series of bills restricting immigration from Asia to the province which were subsequently disallowed by the Laurier cabinet.

The British Columbia Legislature began introducing legislation prohibiting immigration from Asia in the period of 1900–1908. British Columbia had seen a large reduction in Asian immigration between the late 1880s and early 1890s which resulted in a period with less effort to restrict immigration; however, increased immigration in 1899 and 1900 revitalized the call for restrictive immigration legislation in the province. The British government had foreseen the risk of anti-Asian immigration laws damaging imperial relations and trade, and during the 1897 Colonial Conference Secretary of State for the Colonies Joseph Chamberlain expressed concern over the possibility of restrictive legislation in British Columbia. In August 1900, Japan announced voluntary restrictions on emigration to Canada, and a few weeks later the British Columbia Legislature passed the Immigration Act requiring a language test; the act was subsequently disallowed nearly a year later by the Laurier government on the grounds of federal paramountcy on immigration after a petition from the Japanese Consul. The British Columbia Legislature passed a similar act shortly afterwards, which was disallowed six months after its passage. British Columbia continued to pass similar discriminatory legislation throughout 1902–1908 with the understanding the acts would be disallowed by the federal government; the reasoning by the provincial government was a protest to Ottawa, and to publicly display that immigrants from Asia were not welcome in British Columbia. Imperial interest in disallowance grew with the 1902 Anglo-Japanese Alliance. The British Columbia Legislature was also emboldened with the federal cabinet's slow response to disallow legislation, where during the 1800s, Macdonald's government disallowed acts without delay, the Laurier cabinet took their time and disallowed acts could remain in force for months before disallowance. Bruce Ryder notes that because of these delays by the Laurier cabinet, anti-Asian provincial immigration laws were in force more often in the province than not. (Note: The May 1903 Immigration Act was disallowed on March 26, 1904. The British Columbia Legislature passed a new Immigration Act weeks later in April 1904, which was disallowed in January 1905. British Columbia passed a new Immigration Act again in January 1905, which was disallowed in April 1905.) In 1907, British Columbia Lieutenant Governor James Dunsmuir reserved royal assent on the new Immigration Act on his accord, and the federal government refused to recommend royal assent. Dunsmuir reasoned that the bill was similar to the previously disallowed acts, and the bill could interfere with federal interests and international relations. Members of the public rallied against Dunsmuir who previously employed a large number of immigrants from Asia in his coal mines, and his effigy was burned in the 1907 Anti-Oriental Riots in Vancouver. The final attempt by the British Columbia Legislature to regulate immigration from Asia came in 1908, which was made largely inoperable by two court challenges and eventually disallowed by the Laurier cabinet.

In 1911, nearing the end of his period as Prime Minister, Laurier updated the principles for the use of disallowance. Laurier's instructions cautioned "great care" in use and respect for the local legislatures authority to govern in constitutional areas, but urged expediency in use of disallowance where legislatures acted in federal constitutional areas where "great confusion and hardship" could come to the public.

=== 1911–1924: Borden and King ===
The period of 1911–1924 coincided again with a reduction in use of the powers of disallowance by the federal government, with Borden's Conservatives disallowing one act, and King's Liberal government disallowing five acts.

The 1911 Canadian federal election marked the end of Laurier's Liberal government as the Conservative Party under Robert Borden formed the government. Charles Doherty, a critic of Laurier's approach to disallowance, was appointed minister of justice. Doherty strongly believed that the governor general should disallow an act on the grounds it is unjust or interferes with vested rights or the obligations of a contract. Doherty described his view that disallowance "be properly invoked for the purpose of preventing, not inconsistently with the public interest, irreparable injustice or undue interference with private rights or property through the operation of local statutes intra vires of the legislatures". Despite Doherty's broad view of the application of disallowance, he remained reluctant to recommend use of disallowance. Doherty acknowledged he was limited by federalism and the autonomy of provinces, the desire not to embarrass the legislatures, and the difficulty in understanding the facts and reasons behind the passage of the legislation. Through the Borden years only one statute was disallowed, the 1917 British Columbia amendment to the Vancouver Island Settler's Rights Act, 1904 on the grounds that the act constituted an invasion of property rights granted by the Dominion government to the Canadian Pacific Railway. Doherty noted that the use of disallowance aligned with the fourth principle of Macdonald's memo of 1868, and was within the right of the Dominion to disallow the act. Further in this particular case, Doherty believed the power of disallowance was necessary to protect the province from passing unwise bills.

The 1921 Canadian federal election saw the Liberal Party led by Mackenzie King return to power and Sir Lomer Gouin appointed as the new minister of justice. Gouin's opinion on disallowance aligned with those of Doherty, in contrast to the Liberal government under Laurier. Gouin recommended disallowance of An Act to vest certain lands in Victoria County to Jane E. MacNeil, 1922 passed by the Nova Scotia Legislature, which sought to evade a judgement in McNeil v. Sharpe of the Supreme Court of Canada in the trial of which the Legislature felt the appellant MacNeil was poorly represented. The act vested MacNeil with the property taken during her bankruptcy and retroactively disqualified any claims or interests made on the property placed after 1911. Gouin's report concluded the act was "extraordinary" and opposed the "principles of right and justice", and that the Nova Scotia Legislature had made "itself a court of appeal from the Supreme Court of Canada". Federal Conservative Henry Lumley Drayton introduced a motion to Parliament describing federal interference in the law as an abuse of power and interfering within the constitutional rights of provinces to govern. La Forest notes at this instance the opinion of the Conservative and Liberal parties towards disallowance had flipped from the views previously held from Confederation to 1923. Gouin also reviewed a 1921 act of the British Columbia Legislature on the petition of the Japanese Counsel General. The federal Cabinet referred the act to the Supreme Court, which found it was unconstitutional. Gouin subsequently recommended the disallowance of the act, which occurred shortly afterwards.

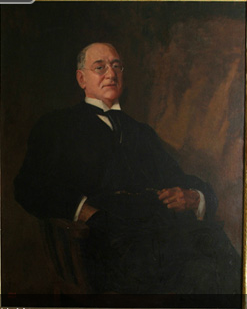
The government of Nova Scotia Premier George Henry Murray requested two acts related to road traffic be disallowed as the acts provided opposing instructions to drivers.

In a unique case, the Nova Scotia government petitioned Gouin to disallow two acts, a 1922 amendment to the Act Relating to the Use of the Road and the 1922 amendment to The Motor Vehicle Act which governed the use of roadways in the province. The Legislature inadvertently passed the amendment to the Act Relating to the Use of the Road requiring drivers to pass on the left, while an amendment to The Motor Vehicle Act required drivers to pass on the right. The government of Nova Scotia asked for the act to be disallowed due to the confusion it would cause and the "grave danger to life and property", a request which Gouin weighed against options to call a special session of the Legislature or refer to the courts. However, Gouin decided that disallowance "best met the needs of the case".

=== 1924–1954: King, Bennett, and St. Laurent ===
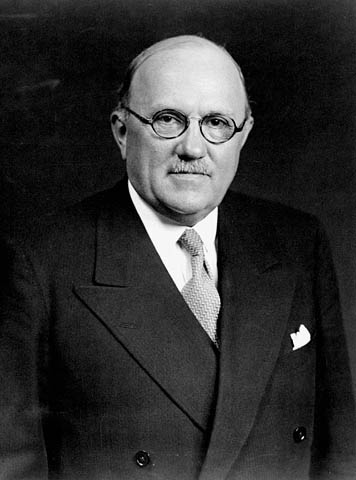
Ernest Lapointe as Minister of Justice recommended the disallowance of several acts of the Alberta Social Credit government.

La Forest describes the final stage for the use of disallowance and reservation to coincide with Ernest Lapointe serving as minister of justice. Lapointe was appointed minister of justice three times, holding the role for over 10 years, with interludes for the Meighen and Bennett governments. With Lapointe, the practice of the minister of justice providing a comprehensive report on provincial acts to be considered for disallowance ended, being replaced with a short special report on those which may be considered for disallowance. Lapointe continued the view that acts within the provincial constitutional jurisdiction should not be disallowed unless they conflicted with Dominion policy. In his report for Alberta's 1924 An Act to impose a Tax upon Minerals, Lapointe was careful to note that while the act constituted an injustice for the group that petitioned for its disallowance, the reason for recommending disallowance was only because it impeded on federal constitutional jurisdiction. Lapointe continued to allow courts to decide the validity of laws which exceeded the provincial governments constitutional authority to govern.

There were no acts disallowed by the Conservative government of Prime Minister Arthur Meighen in place for three months in 1926 following his appointment after the King–Byng affair.

The Conservative government of R. B. Bennett from 1930 to 1935 did not disallow any legislation during their term. La Forest notes that justice minister Hugh Guthrie's reports on questions of disallowance were so brief that it is difficult to determine his personal opinions on the circumstances where disallowance would be acceptable, except that he subscribed to the belief that the courts should decide the validity of laws which may exceed the provincial governments constitutional authorities.

When King's Liberals were returned to government in the 1935 Canadian federal election, Lapointe was once again appointed justice minister. La Forest notes that Lapointe began to include in his reports more detail on the circumstances disallowance might properly be used. In his report on Ontario's 1935 Power Commission Act, which ultimately was not disallowed, Lapointe noted that the then "modern view" of disallowance is incompatible with it being used on provincial legislation which is ultra vires, with the only valid reasons for disallowance being interference with Dominion policy. Lapointe made statements in Parliament echoing his belief, evoking a parallel between Canada's success in seeking autonomy and guarantees during the Imperial Conferences in 1926 and 1930 against the use of disallowance by the government of the United Kingdom, and the relationship between the provinces and federal government. Lapointe went so far as to say he did not think disallowance could easily be used by the federal government.

Lapointe's views on the powers of disallowance and reservation were tested by the government of Alberta under Social Credit Premier William Aberhart. The Aberhart government was elected in 1935 on the pledge to implement social credit, an economic policy developed British engineer C. H. Douglas which included concepts such as $25 monthly dividends. Aberhart's government was slow in implementing economic changes, which resulted in the 1937 Social Credit backbenchers' revolt where members of the legislative assembly revolted openly and threatened to defeat the government in a confidence vote. Aberhart was able to placate the rebellion by promising to implement social credit policies beginning with the Credit of Alberta Regulation Act, the Bank Employees Civil Rights Act, and the Judicature Act Amendment Act. The first required all bankers to obtain a license from the Social Credit Commission and created a directorate for the control of each bank, most members of which would be appointed by the Social Credit Board. The second prevented unlicensed banks and their employees from initiating civil actions. The third prevented any person from challenging the constitutionality of Alberta's laws in court without receiving the approval of the Lieutenant-Governor in Council. All three acts were quickly passed. New Lieutenant-Governor John C. Bowen, asked to grant royal assent, called Aberhart and Attorney-General John Hugill to his office. He asked Hugill if, as a lawyer, he believed that the proposed laws were constitutional; Hugill replied that he did not. Aberhart said that he would take responsibility for the bills, which Bowen then signed. As they left the meeting, Aberhart asked Hugill for his resignation, which he received. The government of Canada found the Alberta acts highly objectionable, as their attempts to regulate banking fell within the constitutional purview of the federal government. The federal government disallowed all three acts shortly after. Following the disallowance, the Aberhart government re-introduced the bills under new names Bank Taxation Act (Bill 1), Credit of Alberta Regulation Act, 1937 (Bill 8), and the Accurate News and Information Act (Bill 9).

The Accurate News and Information Act required newspapers to print "clarifications" of stories that a committee of Social Credit legislators deemed inaccurate, and to reveal their sources on demand. Lieutenant Governor Bowen, mindful of the federal government's disallowance of the Social Credit Board's earlier legislation, reserved royal assent of the acts until their legality could be tested in both the Supreme Court of Canada and the Judicial Committee of the Privy Council. This was the first use of the power of reservation in Alberta history. In Reference Re Alberta Statutes the Supreme Court of Canada struck down the three bills as ultra vires of the province's constitutional authority, affirmed the authority of the lieutenant governor to reserve royal assent, and first proposed the existence of an implied bill of rights protecting civil liberties such as a free press. The Supreme Court in responding to questions posed by the government of Alberta confirmed the validity of disallowance and reservation, with the Court unanimously confirming those powers were still in operation and exercisable. Justice Albert Hudson went so far as to write "there is no room for serious argument" that disallowance and reservation were no longer valid powers.

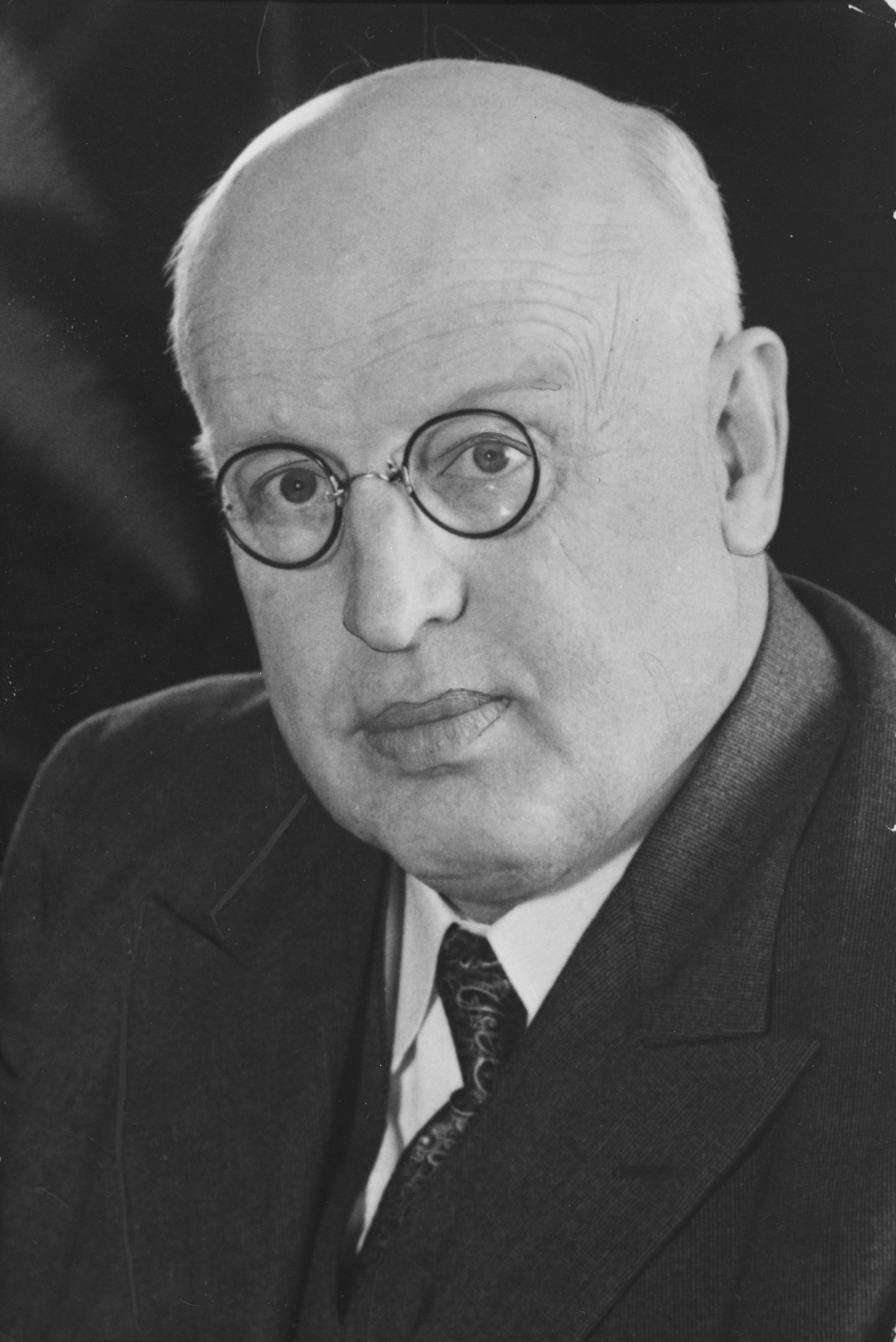
The Social Credit government of Alberta Premier William Aberhart passed eleven acts which were disallowed, and three which had royal assent reserved by Lieutenant Governor John C. Bowen.

Despite its loss in the Supreme Court reference, the government of Alberta continued to bring forward legislation which the federal government found objectionable. In 1939, An Act to amend the Limitation of Actions Act, 1935, which was meant to change the terms on debt agreement, was disallowed, as was another attempt to pass similar legislation a year later. Lapointe died in office in 1941, but his successor as minister of justice Louis St. Laurent continued to recommend the disallowance of Alberta acts that attempted to regulate banking, including The Debt Proceedings Suspension Act, 1941, The Orderly Payment of Land Debts Act, and the Limitations of Actions Act, 1935, Amendment Act, 1941. The final Alberta act disallowed was An Act to prohibit the Sale of Lands to any Enemy Aliens and Hutterites for the Duration of the War which prevented the sale of lands to enemy aliens and Hutterites during the Second World War for security purposes. St. Laurent disallowed the act in April 1943 as the obligation of identifying and restricting enemy aliens was an exclusive authority of the federal government. Alberta Premier William Aberhart died shortly afterwards in May 1943, and his successor Ernest Manning slowly backed away from implementing social credit policies. During this period ending with Aberhart's death eleven Alberta acts were disallowed and three were reserved. The disallowance of Alberta's enemy alien act was the last time disallowance was used.

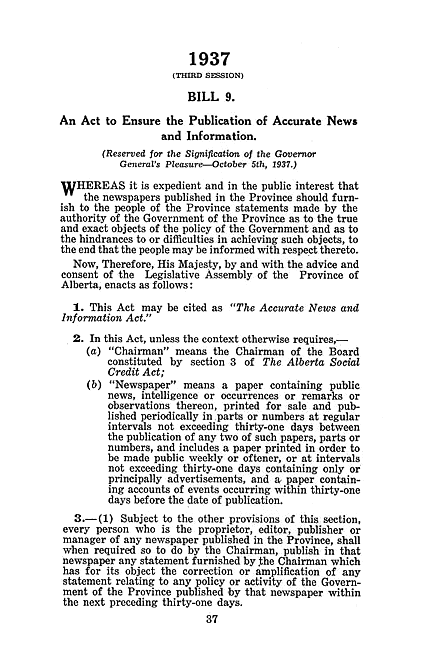
The Accurate News and Information Act was reserved by Lieutenant Governor of Alberta John C. Bowen.

This period was also a period of colonial change for Canada. The unrestricted authority for the government of the United Kingdom to disallow the laws of the Dominions of the British Empire was challenged in the 1926 Imperial Conference, hosted by King George V; there, the Balfour Declaration of 1926, issued by a committee of dominion prime ministers, affirmed the right of each dominion government to advise the Crown on its own affairs and that the government of the United Kingdom should not make a decision against the advice of the dominion government. (Note: The Declaration states, in part: "[A]part from provisions embodied in constitutions or in specific statutes expressly providing for reservation, it is recognized that it is the right of the Government of each Dominion to advise the Crown in all matters relating to its own affairs. Consequently, it would not be in accordance with constitutional practice for advice to be tendered to His Majesty by His Majesty's Government in Great Britain in any matter appertaining to the affairs of a Dominion against the views of the Government of that Dominion.") This was further reinforced by the following 1930 Imperial Conference with the Report of the Conference on the Operation of Dominion Legislation and Merchant Shipping Legislation, 1929 (Cmd 3479), stating that both the prerogative and statutory powers of disallowance had "not been exercised for many years" in relation to dominion legislation. The agreement in 1930 essentially meant the United Kingdom would not reserve or disallow legislation without the approval of the Canadian federal cabinet.

The Balfour Declaration and the 1930 report were non-binding, but were later solidified in the Statute of Westminster 1931 which implemented aspects of the agreements at the imperial conferences, including limiting the legislative authority of the Parliament of the United Kingdom over Canada, effectively giving the country legal autonomy as a self-governing Dominion, though the Parliament of the United Kingdom retained the power to amend Canada's constitution at the request of Canada. The Parliament of the United Kingdom's authority remained in effect until the Constitution Act, 1982, which transferred the authority to amend Canada's constitution to the Parliament of Canada, the final step to achieving full sovereignty. The Statute of Westminster amended the procedure for appointing the governor general, moving from the advice of Privy Council of the United Kingdom to the Canadian Cabinet, removing another aspect of British influence over the Canadian government.

=== 1961: Saskatchewan ===
The power of disallowance has not been used in Canada since the events in Alberta in the early 1940s. The final instance of reservation occurred in 1961 when Lieutenant Governor of Saskatchewan Frank Lindsay Bastedo reserved royal assent of An Act to Provide for the Alteration of Certain Mineral Contracts (Bill 56) at the end of the session during the 14th Legislature. Bastedo reserved the bill on his own accord, and was not instructed to by the governor general in council. The bill passed by the Saskatchewan Co-operative Commonwealth Federation led by Premier Tommy Douglas amended provisions related to mining contracts, and allowed cabinet to modify existing mining contracts. Bastedo argued that he had doubts on the legislation being in the public interest, and that the legislation was not legal. Bastedo's view was not shared by his constitutional advisors. The Progressive Conservative cabinet led by Prime Minister John Diefenbaker quickly passed an order in council to grant royal assent.

== Consideration of disallowance and reservation after 1961 ==
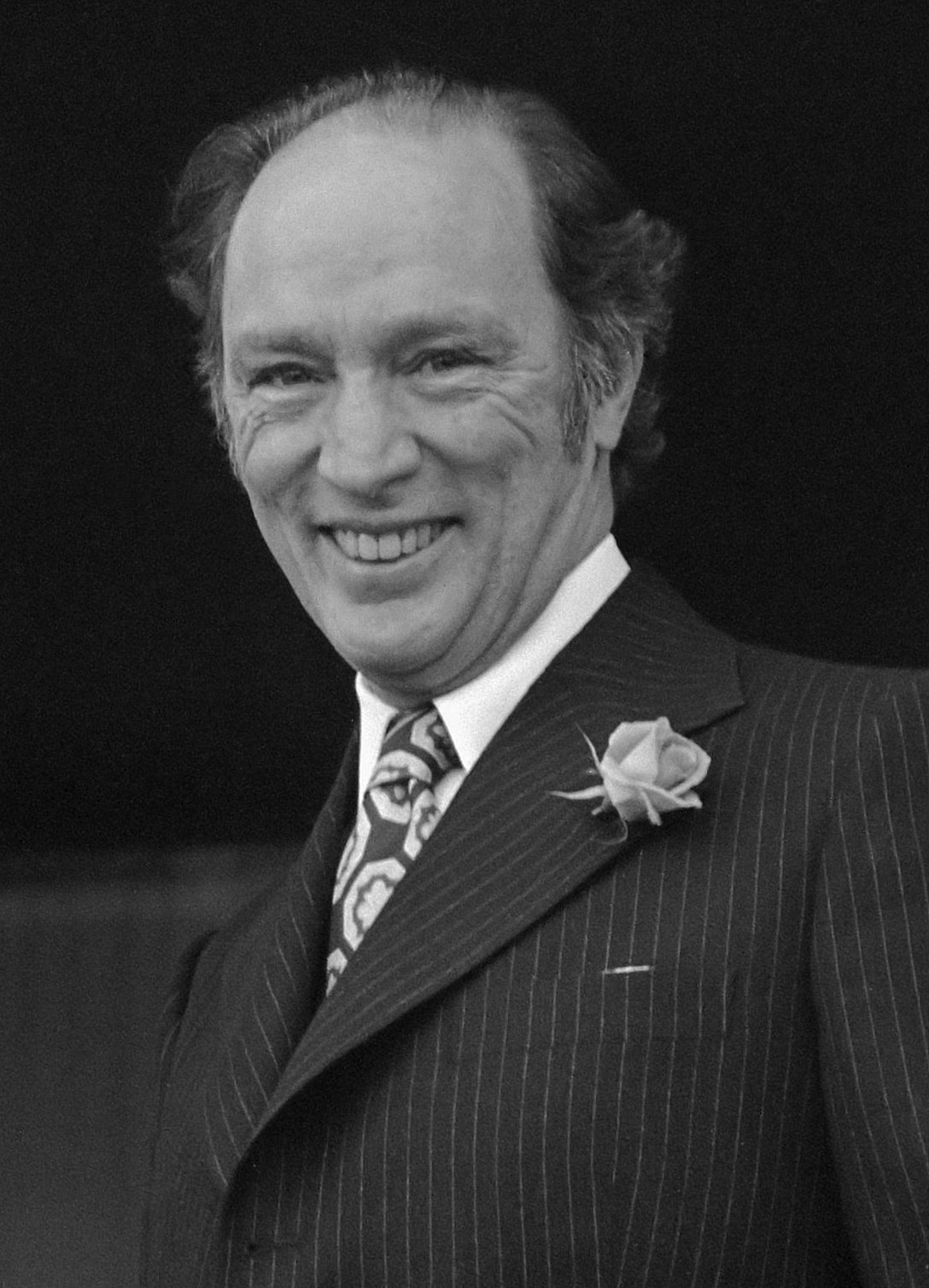
Prime Minister Pierre Trudeau was willing to remove the powers of disallowance and reservation from the Canadian Constitution in exchange for a Bill of Rights.

The government of Pierre Trudeau faced public pressure to disallow Quebec's Charter of the French Language in 1977, which forbade the use of English language signs and openly contravened some procedural linguistic rights protected by the British North America Act. Trudeau, a constitutional scholar, demurred, believing that disallowance would ultimately cause more political harm, and that it was better to have the conflicting matters adjudicated. Trudeau believed that disallowance was warranted only for laws that clearly violated federal power or that created disorder beyond the boundaries of the province enacting the law.

In the 1981 Patriation Reference, the Supreme Court of Canada found that "reservation and disallowance of provincial legislation, although in law still open, have, to all intents and purposes, fallen into disuse", and the non-use of the powers could evolve into a constitutional convention.

While the powers of disallowance and reservation have not been exercised for a substantial period of time, it is common for opposition parties, journalists, and political commentators to call for these powers to be exercised when controversial or unpopular legislation is passed.

=== Proposals for reform ===
The proposed Victoria Charter in 1971 included the removal of the powers of disallowance and reservation. Prime Minister Pierre Trudeau was willing to forgo these powers in exchange for a bill of rights which the provinces would be required to adhere to.

Trudeau remained willing to trade the powers of disallowance and reservation for a bill of rights. In 1978, An Act to amend the Constitution of Canada with respect to matters coming within the legislative authority of the Parliament of Canada (Bill C-60) was introduced to the 30th Parliament by the Liberal government under Pierre Trudeau. The bill included a bill of rights which applied exclusively to the federal government. The bill also permitted provinces to opt-in to the bill of rights, and if they did, the powers of disallowance and reservation were repealed or made inapplicable to the province and legislature.

In a 1980 report by the Senate Standing Committee on Legal and Constitutional Affairs, the powers of disallowance and reservation were described as "obsolete" and not compatible with Canadian federalism.

In the final negotiations for the Constitution Act, 1982, Trudeau was able to succeed in entrenching the Charter of Rights and Freedoms into the Constitution, however he was unwilling to remove disallowance and reservation after the provinces negotiated for the notwithstanding clause. Following patriation of the Constitution, the federal government continued to offer to remove the powers of disallowance and reservation in ongoing constitutional talks, including Meech Lake in 1987 and the Charlottetown Accord in 1992. In 1991, the Beaudoin-Dobbie Committee, a committee composed of Senators and members of Parliament chaired by Senator Gerald Beaudoin and Member of Parliament Dorothy Dobbie published a report on what they heard regarding constitutional reforms proposed by the federal government. The report entitled A Renewed Canada called for changes to federal and provincial constitutional jurisdiction and the removal of disallowance and reservation. Canadian political scientist Peter H. Russell views the abolishment of disallowance and reservation as an eventuality and a "logical quid pro quo" for the federal government and provinces in future constitutional reform discussions.

== List of provincial laws disallowed by year ==
=== Acts disallowed by a governor general ===
Period	Prime Minister	NL	PE	NS	NB	QC	ON	MB	SK	AB	BC	TOTAL
1867–1873	John A. Macdonald	—	—	2	—	1	2	—	—	—	—	5
1873–1878	Alexander Mackenzie	—	—	3	—	1	1	6	—	—	7	18
1878–1891	John A. Macdonald	—	—	1	1	3	5	18	—	—	13	41
1891–1896	Abbot / Thompson / Bowell / Tupper	—	—	—	—	—	—	1	—	—	—	1
1896–1911	Wilfrid Laurier	—	—	—	—	1	2	3	3	—	21	30
1911–1921	Robert Borden	—	—	—	—	—	—	—	—	—	1	1
1921–1926	William Lyon Mackenzie King	—	—	3	—	—	—	—	—	1	1	5
1926–1930	William Lyon Mackenzie King	—	—	—	—	—	—	—	—	—	—	—
1930–1935	R. B. Bennett	—	—	—	—	—	—	—	—	—	—	—
1935–1948	William Lyon Mackenzie King	—	—	—	—	—	—	—	—	11	—	11
1948 +		—	—	—	—	—	—	—	—	—	—	—
TOTAL		—	—	9	1	6	10	28	3	12	43	112

=== Bills reserved by a lieutenant governor ===
Period	Prime Minister	NL	PE	NS	NB	QC	ON	MB	SK	AB	BC	TOTAL
1867–1873	John A. Macdonald	—	—	1	6	1	2	9	—	—	5	24
1873–1878	Alexander Mackenzie	—	4	1	1	1	—	7	—	—	1	15
1878–1891	John A. Macdonald	—	3	1	1	2	—	5	—	—	—	12
1891–1896	Abbot / Thompson / Bowell / Tupper	—	2	—	2	2	—	—	—	—	—	6
1896–1911	Wilfrid Laurier	—	1	—	1	1	—	—	—	—	3	6
1911–1921	Robert Borden	—	—	—	—	—	—	—	—	—	3	3
1921–1926	William Lyon Mackenzie King	—	—	—	—	—	—	—	—	—	—	—
1926–1930	William Lyon Mackenzie King	—	—	—	—	—	—	—	—	—	—	—
1930–1935	R. B. Bennett	—	—	—	—	—	—	—	—	—	—	—
1935–1948	William Lyon Mackenzie King	—	—	—	—	—	—	—	—	3	—	3
1948–1957	Louis St. Laurent	—	—	—	—	—	—	—	—	—	—	—
1957–1963	John Diefenbaker	—	—	—	—	—	—	—	1	—	—	1
1963+		—	—	—	—	—	—	—	—	—	—	—
TOTAL		—	10	3	11	7	2	21	1	3	12	70
