= Unenumerated rights =

Legal rights inferred by existing laws

Unenumerated rights are legal rights inferred from other rights that are implied by existing laws, such as in written constitutions, but are not themselves expressly stated or "enumerated" in law. Alternative terms are implied rights, natural rights, background rights, and fundamental rights.

Unenumerated rights may become enumerated rights when certainty is needed, such as in federal nations where laws of subordinate states may conflict with federal laws.

The term "unenumerated rights" may be used loosely to mean any unstated natural rights and legal rights or the intrinsic human rights of an individual.

== In Australia ==
Implied rights are the political and civil freedoms that necessarily underlie the actual words of the Constitution but are not themselves expressly stated directly in the Constitution. Since the 1990s, the High Court has discovered rights which are said to be implied by the very structure and textual form of the Constitution. Chief amongst these is an implied right to freedom of communication on political matters, which was first recognised in Nationwide News Pty Ltd v Wills. In addition, some protections of civil liberties have been the result of the High Court's zealous attempts to safeguard the independence of, and confidence in, the federal judiciary. A good example of this can be seen in Kable v Director of Public Prosecutions (NSW), in which the High Court struck down a criminal law passed by the New South Wales Parliament that was directed at a single, named individual in a similar manner to a bill of attainder. The High Court also inferred a limited right to vote from the text of the Constitution in Roach v Electoral Commissioner, invalidating legislation that prevented all prisoners from voting.

== In Canada ==
The implied bill of rights (French: déclaration des droits implicite) is a theory in Canadian jurisprudence which proposed that as a consequence of the British North America Act, certain important civil liberties could not be abrogated by the government. The significance of an implied bill of rights has decreased since the adoption of the Canadian Charter of Rights and Freedoms, an entrenched written bill of rights, but remains important for understanding the evolution of Canadian human rights law and the Constitution of Canada. In the 1938 decision of Reference Re Alberta Statutes, a concurring opinion of the Supreme Court of Canada first proposed an implied bill of rights.

== In Ireland ==
Article 40.3 of the Irish Constitution refers to and accounts for the recognition of unenumerated rights. The Supreme Court of Ireland is often the main source of such rights, such as the right to bodily integrity, the right to marry and the right to earn a living, among others.

== In Portugal ==
Article 16 (titled Scope and interpretation of fundamental rights and known as the "open clause of fundamental rights") of the Portuguese Constitution explicitly refers to fundamental rights not enumerated in it, but in other legal sources, reading as follows: "1. The fundamental rights enshrined in the Constitution shall not exclude any others set out in applicable international laws and legal rules. / 2. The constitutional and legal precepts concerning fundamental rights must be interpreted and completed in harmony with the Universal Declaration of Human Rights."

Many fundamental rights are also commonly first pointed out by scholars and the Constitutional Court through the interpretation and breaking down of enumerated rights or general principles, namely the rule of law and human dignity.

== In the Republic of China ==
Article 22 of the Constitution of the Republic of China guarantees unenumerated freedoms and rights of the people that are not detrimental to social order or public welfare, now in effect in Taiwan.

== In the United States ==
In the United States, the Ninth Amendment to the U.S. Constitution protects against federal infringement of unenumerated rights. The text reads:

The enumeration in the Constitution, of certain rights, shall not be construed to deny or disparage others retained by the people.

The Supreme Court of the United States has also interpreted the Fourteenth Amendment to the U.S. Constitution to protect against state infringement of certain unenumerated rights including, among others, the right to send one's children to private school and the right to marital privacy.

The Supreme Court has found that unenumerated rights include such important rights as the right to travel, the right to vote, and the right to keep personal matters private.

State constitutions have also been interpreted to protect unenumerated rights. Sometimes this has been done via provisions with similar language to the Ninth Amendment (often called "Baby Ninth Amendments") and sometimes with provisions with similar language to the Fifth Amendment's and Fourteenth Amendment's due process of law clauses. Unenumerated rights that state courts have found to be protected by these types of provisions are as varied and have included the right to earn a living, the right to establish a home, and the right to refuse medical treatment.

== See also ==
- Natural rights
- Human rights
- Implied powers
- Letter and spirit of the law
- Penumbra (law)
- Positive law
- Unspoken rule
- Substantive due process
