= Padlock Law =

Anti-communist statute passed in Quebec in 1937

Parliament of Quebec
- Long title: An Act to Protect the Province Against Communistic Propaganda
- Citation: 1 George VI Ch. 11; R.S.Q. 1941, c.52
- Enacted by: Legislative Assembly of Quebec
- Enacted by: Legislative Council of Quebec
- Royal assent: March 24, 1937
- Status: Struck down

The Act to Protect the Province Against Communistic Propaganda (French: Loi protégeant la province contre la propagande communiste), commonly known as the "Padlock Law" or "Padlock Act" (French: La loi du cadenas), was a law in the province of Quebec, Canada that allowed the Attorney General of Quebec to close off access to property suspected of being used to propagate or disseminate communist propaganda. The law was introduced by the Union Nationale government of Maurice Duplessis and made it illegal to "use [a house] or allow any person to make use of it to propagate Communism or Bolshevism by any means whatsoever". This included printing, publishing or distributing of "any newspaper, periodical, pamphlet, circular, document or writing, propagating Communism or Bolshevism". Violations of the Act subjected such property to closure by the Attorney General, including the locking of access doors with padlocks, against any use whatsoever for a period of up to one year and any person found guilty of involvement in prohibited media activities could be incarcerated for three to thirteen months.

The law was extremely vague; it did not define Communism or Bolshevism in any concrete way. It denied both the presumption of innocence and freedom of speech to individuals. There were also concerns that the law would be used in order to arrest individual activists from international trade unions. Two union leaders were nearly arrested in that period. The law was used against Jehovah's Witnesses for distributing their publications, most commonly as a "prextext for search and seizure".

The federal government under Liberal Prime Minister William Lyon Mackenzie King could have used its power of disallowance to nullify the Padlock Law, as it had done to overturn equally controversial laws that had been passed by Alberta's Social Credit government around the same time. However, King chose not to intervene in Quebec.

The Supreme Court of Canada's 1957 decision in Switzman v Elbling struck down the law as ultra vires of the provincial government because it was an attempt by the province to enact a statute respecting criminal law, which is the exclusive domain of the federal parliament under the Constitution of Canada. In their concurrence, justices Ivan Rand, Roy Kellock and Douglas Abbott also argued the law was ultra vires because it contravened an implied bill of rights that underlies the Canadian constitution, but this view was not shared by the rest of the majority.

== Gallery ==
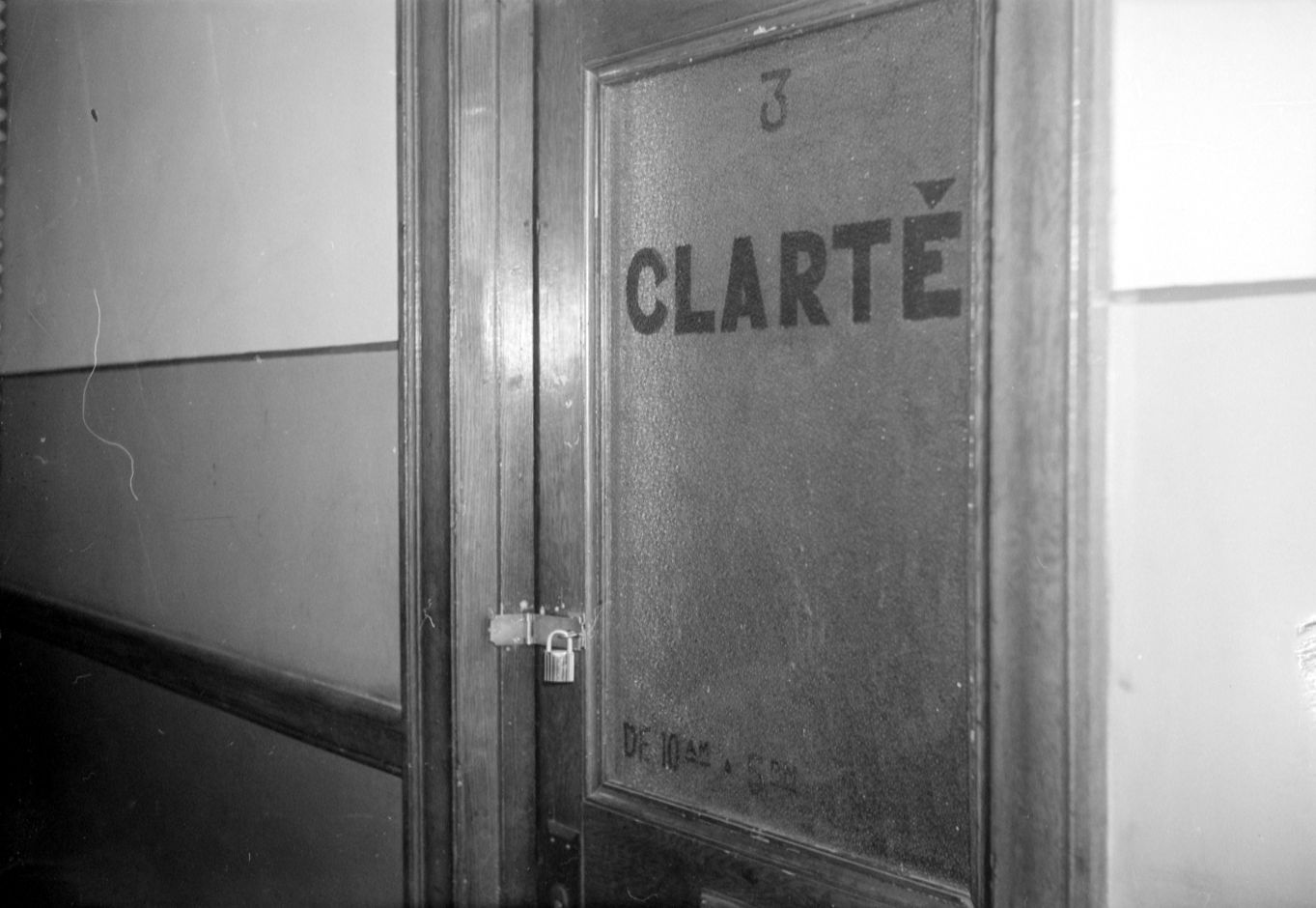
The doorway of the newspaper La Clarté, the French-language weekly of the Communist Party of Canada, padlocked by police in Montreal in 1937.

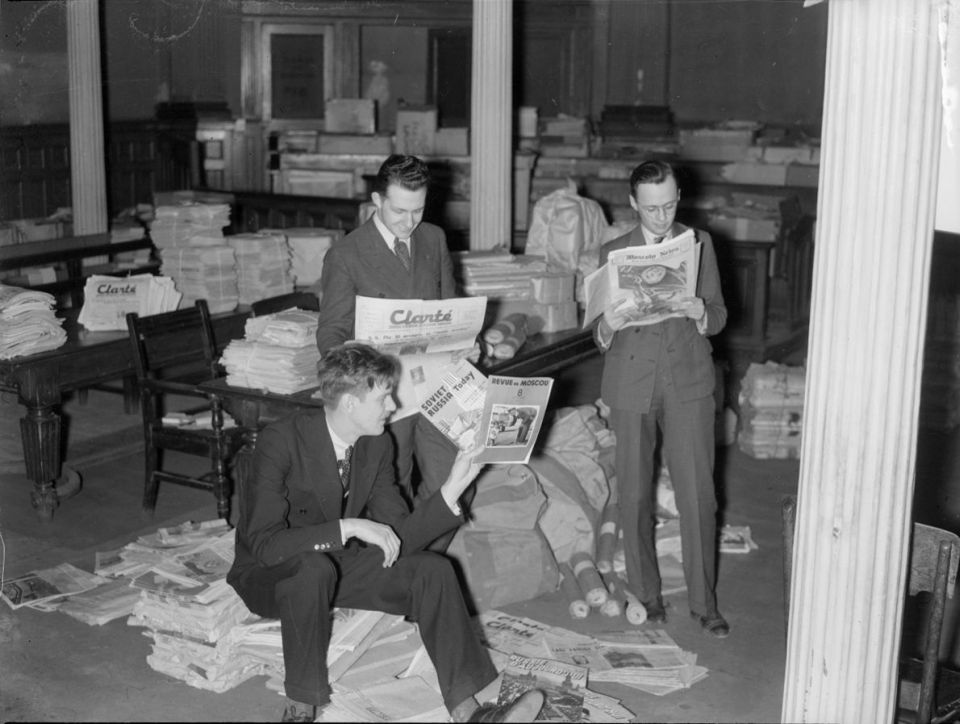
Men reading confiscated literature in Montreal City Hall, 1938.

== See also ==
- Jehovah's Witnesses in Canada
