= Robilliard =

Robilliard may refer to:

== People with the family name ==
- David Robilliard (1952–1988), British contemporary artist from Guernsey.
- Kylie Robilliard (born 1988), British athlete from Guernsey.

== Place ==
- Robilliard Glacier on the Usarp Mountains in Antarctica.
