= Elbing (disambiguation) =

Elbing is the German name of Elbląg, a city in northern Poland.

Elbing may also refer to:

== Places ==
- Elbląg (river), on which the city of Elbląg is located
- Elbing, Kansas, a city in the US

== Ships ==
- SMS Elbing, light cruiser of the Imperial Germany Navy
- Elbing class torpedo boat, in the German Kriegsmarine during World War II
- SS Elbing, a cargo ship in service 1934–45

== See also ==
- Treaty of Elbing, signed between the Dutch Republic and the Swedish Empire in 1656
- Switzman v Elbling, a landmark 1957 Supreme Court of Canada decision
- Elbling, a grape variety
