= Switzman v Elbling =

Switzman v Elbling and A.G. of Quebec
- Supreme Court of Canada

Hearing: November 7-9, 1956 Judgment: March 8, 1957
- Full case name: John Switzman v Freda Elbling and the Attorney-General of the Province of Quebec
- Citations: [1957] SCR 285
- Docket No.: 08263
- Ruling: Appeal allowed

Holding
- The Act Respecting Communistic Propaganda of the Province of Quebec, R.S.Q. 1941, c. 52, is ultra vires of the Provincial Legislature.

Court membership
- Chief Justice: Patrick Kerwin; Puisne Justices: Robert Taschereau, Ivan Rand, Roy Kellock, James Wilfred Estey, Charles Holland Locke, John Robert Cartwright, Gerald Fauteux, Douglas Abbott

Reasons given
- Majority: Kerwin CJ and Locke, Cartwright, Fauteux and Nolan JJ
- Concurrence: Rand, Kellock and Abbott JJ
- Dissent: Taschereau J

Laws applied
- s.91-92 British North America Act, 1867

Switzman v Elbling and A.G. of Quebec, [1957] SCR 285 is a Supreme Court of Canada decision in which the Court ruled that Quebec's Act to Protect the Province Against Communistic Propaganda, commonly known as the "Padlock Law", was ultra vires of the provincial legislature. The Court held that the Padlock Law was a statute respecting criminal law, which is the exclusive authority of the Parliament of Canada under the British North America Act, 1867. Rand, Kellock, and Abbott JJ further held that the law was ultra vires because it violated freedom of expression guaranteed under an implied bill of rights springing from the "democratic form of government established in Canada", but this view was not shared by the rest of the majority.

== History ==
Max Bailey, was a resident of a Park Avenue apartment in Montreal. In February 1948, Bailey, a former Montreal City Councillor and a Communist himself, wanted to assign his apartment to John Switzman, a prominent Marxist who wanted to turn the apartment into a local Communist hub. Freda Elbling, the landlord, tried to prevent Switzman from taking the apartment for fear of having her building appropriated by the province under the Padlock Law. Failing that, she applied to the court to have the lease cancelled.

In his defence, Switzman challenged the Padlock Law as a violation of freedom of speech and as a law ultra vires the power of the provincial government. At trial and on appeal, the courts found in favour of Elbling.

In an 8 to 1 decision, the Supreme Court found that the law was ultra vires and it was struck down.
