= David Robilliard =

British poet and contemporary artist (1952–1988)

- Born: 23 July 1952; Guernsey, Channel Islands
- Died: 3 November 1988 (aged 36); London, England
- Occupations: Poet and contemporary artist
- Years active: 1970s–1980s

David John Keith Robilliard (23 July 1952 – 3 November 1988) was a British poet and contemporary artist.

== Life ==
Robilliard was born in 1952 in Guernsey. He moved to London in 1975, accompanying his friend Lester Queripel, hoping to launch his career as a musician and a poet. Robilliard did not have any formal training as a painter, but he had started writing poetry and making drawings in Guernsey. However, there are no traces of these early poems and drawings: according to Queripel in a letter to Gilbert & George dated 12 November 1988, he consistently destroyed his work as he did not want to be called a "sissy" by his friends. In London, he lived in the Shoreditch area, and shared a studio with Andrew Heard from 1983 onwards. The artist was also his partner. He frequented the London club and pub scene, a familiar presence in places such as Blitz, where Heard worked in the 1970s, Heaven and the Café de Paris, The Bell in King's Cross and The French House in Soho.

== Career ==
Robilliard met Gilbert & George around 1979, and became one of their models; he was charged with finding models for them in Soho, as well as the East and West Ends. He featured in the film The World of Gilbert and George in 1981, repeatedly stating the phrase "I am angry"; his character is described as a "Shot Youth" in the storyboard of the film.

Robilliard pursued his career in poetry during his early years in London. His work was supported by Gilbert & George who also encouraged him to associate images to his written work. They published his first poetry volume, Inevitable, in 1984. His first exhibition of drawings in the same year, at the Stephen Bartley Gallery, was originally only meant as a backdrop to the book's launch. Stephen Bartley describes the way the exhibition developed: "the exhibition was conceived at short notice in collaboration with Andrew Heard, most of the drawings (other than those used in the books) were done in the two weeks before the show. I suggested that David and Andrew hire a few frames so that the drawings could be hung as a backdrop to the party. I was amazed when they produced some 40 pieces and mounted a professional show. Everything was priced at £75, no catalogue was produced because we were concentrating on the book. One sale to Anthony d'Offay resulted. (...) The exhibition was taken down the day after as the frames had to be returned." On the invitation card for the exhibition, Gilbert & George described Robilliard as "the new master of the modern person. Looking, thinking, feeling, seeing, bitching – he brilliantly encapsulates the 'Existers' spirit of our time."

His drawings were also exhibited at the Soho restaurant L'Escargot, where the first public reading of his poetry took place, performed by Stephen Chamberlain. Robilliard did not want to perform his own poetry live; instead, he recruited people to perform his poetry for him. This included artists such as Leo Burley, who relates his experience in "Memory of a Friend". Almost all of the 58 paintings he produced between 1987 and 1988 were portraits. They are portraits of anonymous people he observed, as well as acquaintances and fellow artists such as Heard, Gilbert & George and Duggie Fields.

His second volume of poetry, Swallowing Helmets, was published in 1987. Through 1987, Robilliard distributed shorter poems on postcards that were then sent through the post to a small mailing list (edition of 300). The poems were printed on an old letterpress by the art dealer Paul Conran. They distributed a poem card through the post each month in 1987. In December 1987, the 12 poem cards were reprinted by Birch & Conran as A Box of Poems in an edition of 100 copies; the first 30 copies contained a live cassette recording of Robilliard reading each poem. Birch & Conran also posthumously published poem cards for November and December 1988. His poem cards were also produced by Gilbert & George, Hercules Fisherman, Judy Adam and Lorcan O' Neill. He also wrote books and published articles in The Fred, Square Peg and The Manipulator.

His artwork was exhibited at L'Escargot and the Hippodrome, a music venue on Charing Cross. His work was shown in a posthumous exhibition in 1990, at the Hirschl & Adler Modern gallery in New York. It was also included within the group exhibition The British Art Show 1990 at the Southbank Centre in London. Museum director Rudi Fuchs continued to champion his work, curating a retrospective in 1993 at the Stedelijk Museum in Amsterdam entitled A Roomful of Hungry Looks. Robilliard's work was also frequently curated by Hans Ulrich Obrist, who had met the artist in 1987. He was the subject of a retrospective exhibition at the Institute of Contemporary Arts in London in 2014.

His paintings are held in the permanent collections of Tate Modern, London, the Stedelijk Museum, Amsterdam, and the Arts Council Collection.

== Death ==
Robilliard was diagnosed as HIV positive in 1988. He took to introducing himself as "David Robilliaids" after that point. He died within the year. Gilbert & George wrote a commemorative text on Robilliard, "Our David", dated 7 July 1990: "David Robilliard was the sweetest, kindest, most infuriating, artistic, foul-mouthed, witty, sexy, charming, handsome, thoughtful, unhappy, loving and friendly person we ever met. Over the nine years of our friendship David came closer to us than any other person. He will live forever in our hearts and minds. Starting with pockets filled with disorganised writings and sketches, he went on to produce highly original poetry, drawings and paintings. His truthfulness, sadness, desperation and love of people gave his work a brilliance and beauty that stands out a mile. Not a day passes without our thinking of David. His works live on for us all as a spiritual, cultural force and a great lesson in human love."

== Exhibitions ==
- David Robilliard Solo Show, James Birch Fine Art, London, 1985
- The British Art Show 1990, Southbank Centre, London, 1990
- A roomful of hungry looks, Stedelijk Museum, Amsterdam, 1993
- The yes no quality of dreams, Institute of Contemporary Arts, London, 2014
- David Robilliard: Welcome to the Friendly Isle, Guernsey Museums & Galleries, Guernsey, 2025

== Publications ==
- Inevitable (London, 1984).
- Swallowing Helmets (Eindhoven, 1987).
- A Box of Poems (Birch & Conran, London 1987)
