= Andrew Heard =

British visual artist (1958–1993)

- Born: Andrew Heard; 21 August 1958; Hertford, England
- Died: 9 January 1993 (aged 34); London, England

Andrew Heard (21 August 1958 – 9 January 1993) was a British visual artist.

== Biography ==
Heard was born in Hertford on 21 August 1958. He studied art history at Westfield College (now Queen Mary University of London) and Fine Art at Chelsea School of Art, London. He lived in West Berlin for a period and some of his early successes were one-man shows were at the Friedman-Guinness Gallery in Germany: at Heidelberg in 1987 and Frankfurt in 1989. He also had solo exhibitions in the 1980s in Athens, Amsterdam, Paris and Zurich. From 1983 he shared a studio with the poet and artist David Robilliard in Shoreditch, East London. New directions in his work were marked by the use of large circular canvases in his Strange Fruit series, shown at Connaught Brown in London.

Heard died of AIDS-related complications in London in 1993.
