= Stewart Cameron (cartoonist) =

Canadian cartoonist (1912–1970)

"The Day After Election", a Stewart Cameron cartoon published in the Calgary Herald March 15, 1940. It anticipates the defeat of William Aberhart (at right) in the upcoming 1940 provincial election, and the resulting unemployment of Cameron himself, the "moronic cartoonist" who, by contributing to his favourite target's departure from public life, made himself obsolete. In fact, Aberhart won the election.

Stewart Cameron (1912–1970) was a Canadian cartoonist best known for his cowboy cartoons and his editorial cartoons lampooning Alberta Premier William Aberhart. Born in Calgary, Alberta, the son of prominent lawyer J. McKinley Cameron, he studied art at Mount Royal College, running a pack-string in the Rocky Mountains during the summers, before taking a job with Walt Disney Studios working on Snow White and the Seven Dwarfs in January 1936. At the same time, he drew some editorial cartoons for the Calgary Herald. The Herald was opposed to Social Credit League leader William Aberhart, and Cameron's cartoons reflected this. After Aberhart won the 1935 election, the Herald hired Cameron as its first full-time editorial cartoonist in 1936. His cartoons alienated the Social Credit faithful; his house was once bombed while he was away from it.

Cameron left the newspaper to serve in the Canadian Army during World War II. Upon his return to the Herald in 1945, he found that new Premier Ernest Manning provided less fertile ground for his cartoons than Aberhart had, and moved west in 1947 to take a job with the Vancouver Province. He returned to Calgary in 1949 because of ill health, and spent the rest of his life drawing cartoons free-lance. He died in 1970.

Cowboys and horses were a favourite subject of Cameron's—Alberta Cowboy Country Magazine has called him "a cowboy at heart but a cartoonist by profession"—and after his death his family published four volumes of his cowboy cartoons: What I Saw at the Stampede, Let the Chaps Fall Where They May, Weep for The Cowboy, and Pack Horse in the Rockies.
