= Reference Re Alberta Statutes =

1938 Canadian constitutional law case

- Court: Judicial Committee of the Privy Council
- Full case name: Attorney General of Alberta v Attorney General of Canada
- Decided: July 14, 1938

Case history
- Appealed from: Reference Re Alberta Statutes - The Bank Taxation Act; The Credit of Alberta Regulation Act; and the Accurate News and Information Act, 1938 CanLII 1, [1938] SCR 100 (4 March 1938), Supreme Court (Canada)

Court membership
- Judges sitting: Viscount Maugham LC, Lord Atkin, Lord Thankerton, Lord Russell of Killowen, Lord Macmillan

Case opinions
- Decision by: The Lord Chancellor

Reference Re Alberta Statutes, also known as the Alberta Press case and the Alberta Press Act Reference, is a landmark reference of the Supreme Court of Canada where several provincial laws, including one restricting the press, were struck down and the existence of an implied bill of rights protecting civil liberties such as a free press was first proposed.

== Background ==
The province of Alberta, under the Social Credit government of William Aberhart had passed several laws as part of a series of reforms inspired by social credit economic theory. Arising from the 1937 Social Credit backbenchers' revolt, the Legislative Assembly of Alberta passed several bills to implement the Social Credit agenda, to which royal assent was given:

- Credit of Alberta Regulation Act (requiring all bankers to obtain a licence from the Social Credit Commission)
- Bank Employees Civil Rights Act (preventing unlicensed banks and their employees from initiating civil actions)
- Judicature Act Amendment Act (preventing any person from challenging the constitutionality of Alberta's laws in court without receiving the approval of the Lieutenant-Governor in Council)

In August 1937, the federal government disallowed all three acts. The Supreme Court of Canada, in answering reference questions posed by the federal government, unanimously ruled that such disallowance was valid.

Following the disallowance, the Alberta legislature passed the following bills in October 1937:

- Bill No. 1 Bank Taxation Act (levying provincial taxes on banks' paid-up capital and reserve funds at punitive rates)
- Bill No. 8 Credit of Alberta Regulation Act, 1937 (similar to the previous disallowed act, but covering all "credit institutions")
- Bill No. 9 Accurate News and Information Act (requiring newspapers to print "clarifications" of stories considered inaccurate by the Social Credit Board, and to reveal their sources on demand, and also authorizing the provincial government to prohibit the publication of any newspaper, any article by a given writer, or any article making use of a given source)

All bills were reserved by Lieutenant-Governor John C. Bowen. As a result, the federal government posed reference questions to the Supreme Court as to whether it was intra vires the provincial legislature to pass any of those measures.

== Reference to the Supreme Court of Canada ==
All six members of the court declared the subject matter of all the bills as ultra vires the province. In addition, the court ruled 5-0, (Justice Lawrence Arthur Dumoulin Cannon expressing no opinion) that the Alberta Social Credit Act was unconstitutional as well, as it attempted to intrude on the federal powers relating to currency, banks and banking, and trade and commerce.

As to the Accurate News and Information Act, five of the six justices stated that, since the press bill was ancillary to the Alberta Social Credit Act which had been ruled ultra vires, the press bill was automatically as well, while Cannon considered the subject matter of the bill to be solely under federal jurisdiction. In their concurring opinion for the majority, Chief Justice Lyman Poore Duff and Justice Henry Hague Davis argued that press freedom was too important to be left entirely to the provinces. The three judges argued that the preamble of the British North America Act, 1867, which states that Canada has a constitution similar to that of the United Kingdom, implies that freedom of the press is vital to Canada's democratic system.

== Appeal to the Privy Council ==
The Board declared that, as the Alberta Social Credit Act had been subsequently repealed by the Alberta legislature, Bills 8 and 9 could not be brought into operation, as their provisions were contingent on actions of the now-abolished Social Credit Board. Therefore, the question was moot, and they expressed no opinion on them.

As to Bill 1, the Board agreed with the opinion of Justice Patrick Kerwin (concurred in by Justice Oswald Smith Crocket) that:

The sequence of events after the disallowance of the three Acts is so significant that I can find no escape from the conclusion that, instead of being a taxing enactment, Bill 1 is merely a part of a legislative plan to prevent the operation within the province of those banking institutions which have been called into existence and given the necessary powers to conduct their business by the only proper authority, the Parliament of Canada.

Accordingly, the bill was in pith and substance a measure to regulate banking, and was thus ultra vires the province.

== Significance ==
The SCC ruling is notable because three judges supported the Implied Bill of Rights, a theory in Canadian constitutional law.
