= Roncarelli v Duplessis =

Roncarelli v. Duplessis
- Supreme Court of Canada

Hearing: June 2–6, 1958 Judgment: January 27, 1959
- Full case name: Frank Roncarelli v. The Honourable Maurice Duplessis
- Citations: 1959 CanLII 50, [1959] SCR 121
- Ruling: Trial judge correct, amount awarded at trial increased by $25,000.

Court membership
- Chief Justice: Patrick Kerwin; Puisne Justices: Robert Taschereau, Ivan Rand, Charles Holland Locke, John Robert Cartwright, Gerald Fauteux, Douglas Abbott, Ronald Martland, Wilfred Judson

Reasons given
- Majority: Martland J., joined by Locke J.
- Concurrence: Kerwin C.J.
- Concurrence: Rand J., joined by Judson J.
- Concurrence: Abbott J.
- Dissent: Taschereau J.
- Dissent: Cartwright J.
- Dissent: Fauteux J.

Roncarelli v Duplessis, [1959] SCR 121, is a landmark constitutional decision of the Supreme Court of Canada. The court held that in 1946 Maurice Duplessis, both Premier and Attorney General of Quebec, had overstepped his authority by ordering the manager of the Liquor Commission to revoke the liquor licence of Frank Roncarelli, a Montreal restaurant owner and Jehovah's Witness who was an outspoken critic of the Roman Catholic Church in Quebec. Roncarelli provided bail for Jehovah's Witnesses arrested for distributing pamphlets attacking the Roman Catholic Church. The Supreme Court found Duplessis personally liable for $33,123.56 in damages plus Roncarelli's court costs.

A significant decision on civil liberties in the pre-Charter era, Roncarelli became known as one of the central cases in the constitutional theory later called the "Implied Bill of Rights." Justice Morris Fish would describe it as "Canada's most important decision on the rule of law."

== Background ==
The Jehovah's Witnesses began to aggressively evangelize and seek converts among Catholic French Canadians in the mid-1940s. Methods included home services, public lectures, and distributing pamphlets and selling periodicals such as The Watchtower and Awake! door to door. These were unpopular with the Catholic majority. Meetings were broken up, and members were beaten, ordered out of town, or even thrown out of the province. Protestant groups had traditionally limited themselves to winning converts among the English-speaking minority, and Jehovah's Witnesses aggressively attacked other faiths as paths to damnation, particularly Roman Catholicism, so they became the target of Quebec's powerful Catholic Church.

In 1945, Maurice Duplessis acting as both Premier and Attorney General of Quebec, had provincial and municipal authorities take action against what they considered seditious and offensive behaviour, resulting in the arrest of groups of Jehovah's Witnesses in Montreal for distributing pamphlets and literature. A Montreal city bylaw had been enacted in 1945 requiring a licence "for peddling any kind of wares" to curtail their activity. This carried a fine of $40 or 60 days imprisonment. The accused pleaded 'not guilty", maintaining that under the Quebec Freedom of Worship Act they were ministers of the Gospel and could visit homes and distribute literature without a permit. The police arrested over a thousand young Jehovah's Witnesses between 1944 and 1946. All of these cases would eventually be thrown out of court. (see Saumur v. The City of Quebec.)

Frank (Francesco) Roncarelli was an Italian immigrant and a member of Jehovah's Witnesses. In 1946 he was the owner of the Quaff Cafe, a successful upscale restaurant on Crescent Street in Montreal started by his father in 1912. It had been continually licensed by the Quebec Liquor Commission to serve alcohol for that period. Roncarelli used his wealth to secure bail bonds for the accused, eventually furnishing bail for Jehovah's Witnesses about 390 times putting up a total surety of $83 000.

The defence and lawyers for the city and province agreed to proceed with a test case, but the large numbers of bonds led to a backlog of cases. The Chief Prosecutor of the city, Oscar Gagnon, was overwhelmed by the number of Witnesses being arrested and then set free by Roncarelli's intervention. On November 25, 1946, city courts decided that the property bonds posted for bail by Roncarelli would no longer be accepted. In response, the Jehovah's Witnesses circulated "Quebec's Burning Hate", a pamphlet with a blistering attack in the Church and Duplessis government. Gagnon would contact the Premier who spoke to Édouard Archambault, Chairman of the Quebec Liquour Commission. Roncarelli's licence was subsequently revoked by Premier Duplessis, who later called a press conference to announce that he had cancelled Roncarelli's licence because of his support of Witnesses. Extensive testimony showed the government actors believed that Roncarelli was disrupting the court system, causing civil disorder and so was not entitled to the liquor licence.

On December 4, 1946, shortly before 2 p.m., constables of the Quebec Liquor Police entered the Quaff Cafe while it was full of diners, and confiscated all the liquor. On the same day, Premier Duplessis convened a press conference announcing that he had ordered the Quebec Liquor Commission to suspend Roncarelli's liquor licence because of his support of the Jehovah's Witness prisoners. Duplessis would declare their activities as seditious and compare their activities to those of Nazis and Communists. Roncarelli was told that he was barred from holding a liquor licence and that the action was a warning that others would similarly be stripped of provincial "privileges" if they persisted in their activities related to the Witnesses. Roncarelli tried to keep his business open without the licence, but it was not profitable, and he put it up for sale within six months.

Roncarelli would sue for damages. He employed Stein & Stein, a law firm involved in many civil rights cases, to sue Archambault. But the Quebec Alcoholic Liquor Act says the QLC chairman could not be sued without the permission of the Chief Justice of Quebec, who did not give his consent. He attempted to sue the Quebec Liquor Commission, but that required the support of the Attorney General to proceed, who was Duplessis. Duplessis responded at a February 7, 1947, press conference by saying that the licence was now suspended "forever". Roncarelli would bring on civil rights lawyers F. R. Scott to again petition the Chief Justice to sue Archambeault, to no avail. Roncarelli then sued Premier Duplessis directly, asking $118,741, but was awarded $8000 when he won his case in Superior Court. Both parties appealed and the Quebec Court of Appeal overturned the case with one judge dissenting.

== Decision ==
In a 6–3 decision, the Supreme Court of Canada reinstated the trial decision, holding that Duplessis wrongfully caused the revocation of Roncarelli's liquor licence.

The six judges who sided with Roncarelli used different legal reasoning to reach their decision. Three judges wrote that Duplessis had ordered the cancellation outside his authority as premier; two judges stated that although Duplessis had the power to order the cancellation, he had done so in bad faith; and the sixth judge concluded the premier was not entitled to immunity as a public official. Justice Ivan Rand wrote in his often-quoted reasons that the unwritten constitutional principle of the "rule of law" meant no public official was above the law and so could neither suspend nor dispense it. Although Duplessis had authority under the relevant legislation, his decision was not based on any factors related to the operation of the licence but was made for unrelated reasons and so was held to be exercised arbitrarily and without good faith.

Roncarelli was awarded $33,123.53 in damages as well as costs in the Court of Queen's Bench and the Supreme Court of Canada. Roncarelli's son maintained that it was also a significant moral victory in his father's struggle against the system.

Roncarelli's legal counsel throughout were A. L. Stein and Professor Frank Scott.

=== Dissent ===
Cartwright wrote a dissenting judgement which argued that it was within the power of the commission to refuse to grant Roncarelli a permit, as the act only fettered the commission by delineating circumstances under which the granting of a permit was forbidden and circumstances in which the cancellation of a permit was mandatory. Cartwright argued that as the Commission was an administrative tribunal, not a judicial one, it was "a law unto itself" and did not need to base its decision on anything more than policy and expediency. Cartwright went on to argue that even if the Commission were to be considered quasi-judicial, in which case procedural fairness guarantees would apply, that still would not entitle the plaintiff to monetary damages.

== See also ==
- Lamb v Benoit
- List of Supreme Court of Canada cases (Richards Court through Fauteux Court)
- Persecution of Jehovah's Witnesses in Nazi Germany
- Jehovah's Witnesses and governments
