= Implied bill of rights =

Canadian legal theory

The implied bill of rights (French: déclaration des droits implicite) is a theory in Canadian jurisprudence which proposed that as a consequence of the British North America Act, certain important civil liberties could not be abrogated by the government. The significance of an implied bill of rights has decreased since the adoption of the Canadian Charter of Rights and Freedoms, an entrenched written bill of rights, but remains important for understanding the evolution of Canadian human rights law and the Constitution of Canada. In the 1938 decision of Reference Re Alberta Statutes, a concurring opinion of the Supreme Court of Canada first proposed an implied bill of rights.

The rights and freedoms that are protected under the Charter, including the rights to freedom of speech, habeas corpus, and the presumption of innocence, have their roots in a set of Canadian laws and legal precedents related to "implied rights". Although implemented in judiciary law and part of required reading in Canadian law schools, the theory was never codified either in legislation or in the constitution by the majority in the Supreme Court of Canada. Prior to the advent of the Canadian Bill of Rights in 1960 and its successor the Charter of Rights and Freedoms in 1982, the laws of Canada did not provide much in the way of civil rights and it was typically of limited concern to the courts.

== Theory ==
The concept of an implied bill of rights developed alongside Canadian federalism.

Beverley McLachlin, the 17th chief justice of Canada, stated:

Canada’s experience can be divided into three phases:

1. Judicially implied rights;
2. Legislatively protected rights; and
3. Constitutionally protected human rights.

Before human rights legislation and the Charter, courts in Canada relied on the theory of an “implied bill of rights” to protect traditional civil liberties such as freedom of speech and association. The theoretical foundation for these rights was the importance of free political speech and discussion in a democracy....But the protection of the implied bill of rights was limited and uncertain....It was applied in only a few cases.

When provincial legislation intrudes deeply into fundamental freedoms of speech, religion, association or assembly, the provincial legislature is creating criminal legislation, which under the distribution of powers is reserved exclusively to the Parliament of Canada by section 91(27) of the Constitution Act, 1867.

Provinces cannot intrude in this area; if they do, such legislation is void and has no effect. Since provincial prohibitions touching on the fundamental freedoms of speech, religion, assembly and association were declared unconstitutional by the courts, and in light of the expansive obiters in the leading cases, the writers were able to claim that there was a bill of rights implicit in the Constitution.

Some constitutional scholars focus on the Preamble to the Constitution Act, 1867, as providing the underlying reasons for an implied bill of rights. The relevant part of the preamble reads:

Whereas the Provinces of Canada, Nova Scotia and New Brunswick have expressed their Desire to be federally united into One Dominion under the Crown of the United Kingdom of Great Britain and Ireland, with a Constitution similar in Principle to that of the United Kingdom ...

Some authors have taken the view that the words "similar in principle" means that in Canada there must be a parliamentary system of government, acting under the influence of public opinion, of a free press, with free speech. Thus, legislation which destroyed the citizen's ability to debate, to assemble or to associate freely would be contrary to Canada's democratic parliamentary system of government. This provides an additional underpinning for the claim of an implied bill of rights in Canada's Constitution.

Invoked more often before the Canadian Charter of Rights and Freedoms was enacted, it is nonetheless important when questions of parliamentary supremacy and the override power come into play.

== History ==
=== Jurisprudence before 1982 ===
In Canadian law, the concept of an implied bill of rights has emerged through various judicial decisions over the years.

- Reference Re Alberta Statutes (1938) (Note: Attorney General of Alberta v Attorney General of Canada [1938] UKPC 46 (14 July 1938), P.C., affirming Reference Re Alberta Statutes - The Bank Taxation Act; The Credit of Alberta Regulation Act; and the Accurante News and Information Act, 1938 CanLII 1, [1938] SCR 100 (4 March 1938), Supreme Court (Canada))
- Boucher v the King (1950) (Note: Boucher v the King, 1950 CanLII 2, [1951] SCR 265 (18 December 1950), Supreme Court (Canada))
- Winner v SMT (Eastern) Ltd (Note: Israel Winner (doing business under the name and style of Mackenzie Coach Lines) and others v SMT (Eastern) Limited and others [1954] UKPC 8 (22 February 1954), P.C., affirming Winner v SMT (Eastern) Ltd, 1951 CanLII 2, [1951] SCR 887 (22 October 1951), Supreme Court (Canada))
- Saumur v Quebec (Note: Saumur v City of Quebec, 1953 CanLII 3, [1953] 2 SCR 299 (6 October 1953), Supreme Court (Canada))
- Chaput v Romain (Note: Chaput v Romain, 1955 CanLII 74, [1955] SCR 834 (15 November 1955), Supreme Court (Canada))
- Switzman v Elbling (Note: Switzman v Elbling and Attorney-General of Quebec, 1957 CanLII 2, [1957] SCR 285 (8 March 1957), Supreme Court (Canada))
- Roncarelli v Duplessis (Note: Roncarelli v Duplessis, 1959 CanLII 50, [1959] SCR 121 (27 January 1959), Supreme Court (Canada))

In Alberta Statutes, Duff CJ held that:

the principle that the powers requisite for the protection of the constitution itself arise by necessary implication from the British North America Act as a whole; (Note: relying on Fort Frances Pulp and Paper v Manitoba Free Press (Note: The Fort Frances Pulp and Paper Company Limited v The Manitoba Free Press Company Limited and others [1923] UKPC 64, [1923] AC 695 (25 July 1923), P.C. (on appeal from Ontario))) and since the subject-matter in relation to which the power is exercised is not exclusively a provincial matter, it is necessarily vested in Parliament.

Cannon J agreed, and also stated:

Democracy cannot be maintained without its foundation: free public opinion and free discussion throughout the nation of all matters affecting the State within the limits set by the criminal code and the common law. Every inhabitant in Alberta is also a citizen of the Dominion. The province may deal with his property and civil rights of a local and private nature within the province; but the province cannot interfere with his status as a Canadian citizen and his fundamental right to express freely his untrammelled opinion about government policies and discuss matters of public concern.

While Duff's and Cannon's dicta focused on the competence of the provincial legislatures, Abbott J later stated in Switzman that the same restrictions applied to the Parliament of Canada as well, declaring that "Parliament itself could not abrogate this right of discussion and debate."

The concept was expanded in Winner, which held that citizens were free to move across provincial borders and live wherever they chose to. Roncarelli later held that public officials were subject to the rule of law and therefore could neither suspend nor dispense it arbitrarily, but must act within their official powers.

=== Post-Charter ===
The Supreme Court revisited the implied bill of rights theory in the Provincial Judges Reference. (Note: Reference re Remuneration of Judges of the Provincial Court of PEI; Reference re Independence and Impartiality of Judges of the Provincial Court of PEI, 1997 CanLII 317, [1997] 3 SCR 3 (18 September 1997), Supreme Court (Canada)) The Court referred to both the Charter and the implied bill of rights theory to rule that governments may not compromise judicial independence. As outlined by the majority, the proper function of the implied bill of rights after the adoption of the Charter is to "fill in the gaps" in the express terms of the constitutional texts. However, while the Court stated that the theory was able to fill in the details of judicial independence, the Court actually relied on the Charter to do so. The Court fell short of using the preamble to state new constitutional obligations or limitations. Lamer CJ's extensive obiter did return Canadian constitutional theory to the classical model of rights implicit in the Constitution which was first developed in Alberta Press, Saumur and Switzman, noting:

95. But the preamble does have important legal effects. Under normal circumstances, preambles can be used to identify the purpose of a statute, and also as an aid to construing ambiguous statutory language... The preamble to the Constitution Act, 1867, certainly operates in this fashion. However, in my view, it goes even further. In the words of Rand J, the preamble articulates "the political theory which the Act embodies"... It recognizes and affirms the basic principles which are the very source of the substantive provisions of the Constitution Act, 1867. As I have said above, those provisions merely elaborate those organizing principles in the institutional apparatus they create or contemplate. As such, the preamble is not only a key to construing the express provisions of the Constitution Act, 1867, but also invites the use of those organizing principles to fill out gaps in the express terms of the constitutional scheme. It is the means by which the underlying logic of the Act can be given the force of law.

The ideas outlined in Provincial Judges were developed further in the Reference re Secession of Quebec. (Note: Reference re Secession of Quebec, 1998 CanLII 793, [1998] 2 SCR 217 (20 August 1998), Supreme Court (Canada)) Together, these two cases have been interpreted to expand the reach of unwritten constitutional principles. The 1867 preamble and the Canadian Constitution (including its newer addition, the Charter) are read as a unified whole. The express provisions of the constitution elaborate underlying, organizing principles. These unwritten principles can shape "a constitutional argument that culminates in the filling of gaps in the express terms of the constitutional text" and that in "certain circumstances give rise to substantive legal obligations" that "are binding upon both courts and governments".

In Toronto (City) v Ontario (Attorney General), the Supreme Court held that unwritten constitutional principles could not serve as an independent basis to strike down legislation.
