= Ivan Rand =

Canadian politician and Supreme Court judge

The Honourable Ivan Rand CC
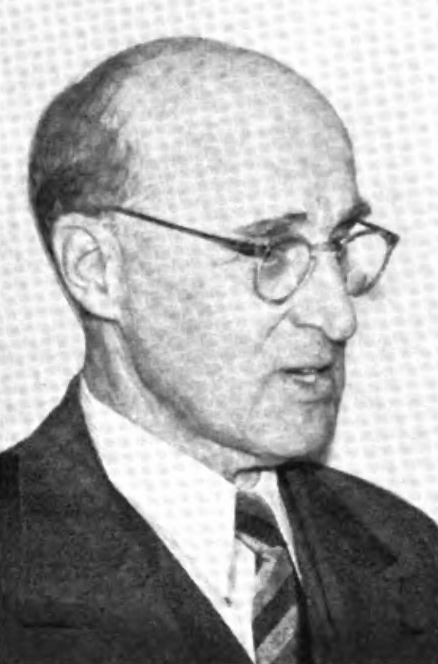
- Rand c. 1954

Puisne Justice of the Supreme Court of Canada
- In office April 22, 1943 – April 27, 1959
- Nominated by: William Lyon Mackenzie King
- Preceded by: Oswald Smith Crocket
- Succeeded by: Roland Ritchie

Attorney General of New Brunswick
- In office October 4, 1924 – September 10, 1925
- Premier: Peter Veniot
- Preceded by: James P. Byrne
- Succeeded by: John Babington Macaulay Baxter

Member of the Legislative Assembly of New Brunswick
- In office February 1925 – July 17, 1925 Serving with Peter Veniot, Seraphine R. Léger, and J. André Doucet
- Preceded by: James P. Byrne
- Succeeded by: John B. London
- Constituency: Gloucester

15th President of the New Brunswick Branch of the Canadian Bar Association
- In office 1935–1937
- Preceded by: Sir Douglas Hazen
- Succeeded by: H. A. Porter

Personal details
- Born: Ivan Cleveland Rand; April 27, 1884 Moncton, New Brunswick, Canada
- Died: January 2, 1969 (aged 84) London, Ontario, Canada
- Spouse: Iredell I. Baxter
- Education: Mount Allison University; Harvard University
- Profession: Lawyer

Ivan Cleveland Rand CC (April 27, 1884 – January 2, 1969) was a Canadian lawyer, politician, academic, and justice of the Supreme Court of Canada. He has been described as "probably the greatest judge in Canada's history".

== Early life and career ==
Born in Moncton, New Brunswick, the son of Nelson Rand and Minnie Turner, he received a Bachelor of Arts degree from Mount Allison University in 1909. Rand read law prior to attending Harvard Law School, graduating in 1912 with a Bachelor of Law degree. He was called to the bar of New Brunswick in 1912. From 1912 to 1920, he practised law in Medicine Hat, Alberta. Returning to Moncton in 1920, he joined the Canadian National Railways as counsel.

In 1924, he was named Attorney General of New Brunswick and was a member of the Legislative Assembly of New Brunswick from February to June 1925.

On June 11, 1933, Rand was elected president of the New Brunswick Barristers Society.

== Judicial career ==
On April 22, 1943, Prime Minister William Lyon Mackenzie King appointed Rand to the Court at the age of 58, filling the vacancy created by the retirement of Oswald Smith Crocket. Rand was described by historians Snell and Vaughan as "on of the most outstanding legal minds" from the maritimes.

During his tenure, Rand delivered many leading judgments. He is perhaps best remembered for his judgment in Roncarelli v Duplessis, which has been described as "iconic".

In a 1946 arbitration decision, he developed the Rand formula requiring payment of trade union dues by all employees in the bargaining unit affected by a collective agreement, whether or not the employees are members of the union. This compromise was instrumental to the cessation of violence and promotion of industrial stability, as it required the unions to "work now, grieve later," and in exchange, the employers had to remit union dues by automatic check-off of the dues formula.

== Post-Supreme Court career ==
Rand retired from the Canadian Supreme Court on April 27, 1959, upon reaching the mandatory retirement age of 75.

From 1959 to 1964, he was the first Dean of the law school of the University of Western Ontario. In 1966, he chaired a Royal Commission into allegations of improper stock trading against Supreme Court of Ontario justice Leo Landreville.

In 1968, he was made a Companion of the Order of Canada. He received honorary degrees from Mount Allison University, the University of New Brunswick, Dalhousie University, Queen's University, the University of Toronto, the University of Western Ontario and Columbia University.

== Palestine ==
Rand was Canada's appointee to the United Nations Special Committee on Palestine following World War II. As such, Rand visited Mandatory Palestine in 1947 and became a supporter of partition supporting UNSCOP's majority report which led to the United Nations Partition Plan for Palestine. The plan was accepted by Jewish leaders but rejected by the Palestinians. He became a supporter of the state of Israel once it was created in 1948 and visited in 1959 to dedicate a forest in Jerusalem named in his honour. Rand's meeting with William Lovell Hull, a fellow Canadian, changed Rand's understanding of Zionism. Rand became the central and most influential swing vote on UNSCOP in favour of the United Nations Partition Plan for Palestine and the eventual creation of the State of Israel.

== Assessment ==
He has been described as "probably the greatest judge in Canada's history" and "perhaps the greatest exponent of the rule of law in the history of the Supreme Court of Canada". Rand was known for asking repeated probing questions to counsel in Court, and was said to use the word "why" like a machine gun.

Biographer William Kaplan describes Rand as "an intolerant bigot" who disliked French Canadians, Catholics, Jews and Canadians who were not of British stock. When his sister married an Acadian, Rand refused to talk to her for 30 years. Nevertheless, as a judge, Rand was a civil libertarian who struck down restrictive covenants that barred property from being sold or rented to Jews or non-whites, acknowledged the rights of Japanese Canadians who were being interned as enemy aliens during World War II, defended the rights to free speech of the Communist Party of Canada when it was banned by the Canadian government under the War Measures Act as well as the rights of Jehovah's Witnesses being persecuted under Quebec's Padlock Law. During his tenure as dean of the University of Western Ontario's law school he was reluctant to hire a Jewish applicant claiming that a small town like London, Ontario could not abide "too many Jews". He would complain regularly about people whose names ended with vowels. Kaplan explained this contradiction in describing Rand as a person with a "first rate mind but a third rate temperament".

== See also ==
- Roncarelli v Duplessis
