= Edmund L. Taylor =

Canadian politician (1860–1934)

Edmund Landor Taylor
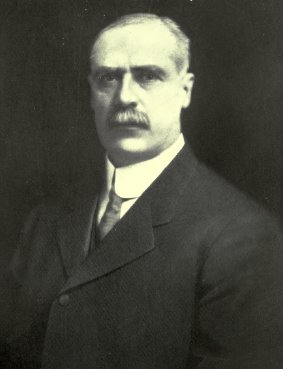

Member of the Legislative Assembly of Manitoba for Gimli
- In office 1913–1914
- Preceded by: Baldwin Baldwinson
- Succeeded by: Sveinn Thorvaldson

Member of the Legislative Assembly of Manitoba for St. George
- In office 1914–1915
- Succeeded by: Skuli Sigfusson

Personal details
- Born: December 14, 1860 Leeds County, Canada West
- Died: September 9, 1934 (aged 73) Winnipeg, Manitoba

Edmund Landor Taylor (December 14, 1860 – September 9, 1934) was a politician in Manitoba, Canada. He served in the Legislative Assembly of Manitoba from 1913 to 1915, as a member of the Conservative Party.

Taylor was born in Leeds County, Canada West (now Ontario), the son of Henry J. Taylor and Mary Redmond. He attended high school in Gananoque, and moved to Manitoba in 1881. Taylor continued his education, and attended the Winnipeg Collegiate Institute and the Manitoba Provincial Normal School, receiving a First Class Teacher's Certificate. He worked as the deputy register of Rock Lake County from 1881 to 1883, and worked as an educator from 1883 to 1886.

In 1886, he began training as a law student with James Albert Manning Aikins, later the Lieutenant Governor of Manitoba. He continued his studies in the firms of Tupper, Phippen & Tupper after 1892, and was called to the bar in 1895. He worked as a barrister-at-law after this time. Taylor was also a director of several companies. In 1902, Taylor married Una C. Preston. In religion, he was a Methodist. He was named a King's Counsel in 1907.

He sought election to the House of Commons of Canada in a by-election for the riding of Winnipeg, held on April 27, 1894. This by-election was called after the previous election of Hugh John Macdonald was declared void. Running as the Conservative candidate, Taylor lost to Liberal Richard Willis Jameson by 1,115 votes.

He campaigned for the Manitoba legislature in the Mountain constituency in the 1910 provincial election, and lost to Liberal candidate James Baird by 282 votes. He was elected to the legislature three years later in a by-election for the Gimli constituency, held on May 12, 1913. On this occasion, Taylor defeated Liberal candidate A. Eggerston by 842 votes. He served in the legislature as a backbench supporter of Rodmond Roblin's government.

Taylor was re-elected for the constituency of St. George in the 1914 provincial election, defeating Liberal Skuli Sigfusson by 101 votes. He continued to serve as a government backbencher.

The Roblin administration was forced to resign from office in 1915 amid a serious corruption scandal. A new election was called, which the Liberal Party won in a landslide. Taylor was not a candidate for re-election.

Taylor died in Winnipeg in 1934.
