= Keith Cosens =

Canadian politician

Keith Alan Cosens (July 7, 1932 – April 27, 1990) was a Canadian politician in Manitoba. He was a Progressive Conservative member of the Legislative Assembly of Manitoba from 1977 to 1981, and served as a cabinet minister in the government of Sterling Lyon.

Born in Teulon, Manitoba, Cosens was raised on the family farm near Argyle, was educated at Brant-Argyle School, Stonewall Collegiate and the University of Manitoba, taught school in Kelwood, Wawanesa and Rosser, and was vice-principal of Stonewall Collegiate in Stonewall, Manitoba before entering politics. In 1952, he married Marie Smith. He ‌was elected to the Manitoba legislature in the 1977 election, defeating New Democrat George Schreyer by 720 votes in the riding of Gimli. On October 24, 1977, he was named Minister of Education and Minister of Continuing Education and Manpower in Lyon's government. He was dropped from the latter position on April 1, 1978, but retained the former throughout Lyon's tenure as Premier.

In the provincial election of 1981, he lost to NDP candidate John Bucklaschuk by 730 votes. He did not seek a return to politics after this time.

Cosens served as president of the Interlake Teachers’ Association and on the provincial executive of the Manitoba Teachers’ Society. After leaving politics, he was president of Northern Goose Processors in Teulon. He also served as executive director of the Progressive Conservative Party of Manitoba.

He died of cancer in Winnipeg at the age of 57.

A street in Stonewall, Manitoba has been named after him. The certificate Keith was given in 1977 to mark his position with the Manitoba Legislative Assembly as Minister of Education is on display in his hometown, Argyle, Manitoba at Settlers, Rails & Trails. He is noted as an important alumnus of the Brant-Argyle School at the museum.
