= Mennville, Manitoba =

Coordinates: 51.127°N 96.991°W

Mennville is a small Dutch German community just north of Riverton, Manitoba. The community is based around the Mennville Evangelical Mennonite Church. The other main buildings are the Mennville Christian School which is now the mtg place of a church community called; Anchor of Hope, and the Appledale Apartments, 55+ housing. The community is located in the Rural Municipality of Bifrost. First started in 1951, and still agricultural based economy, though tourism/cottage country and industries and jobs in that field are also present.
