= Gimli (electoral district) =

Defunct provincial electoral district in Manitoba, Canada

Coordinates: 50.764°N 97.064°W

Manitoba electoral district
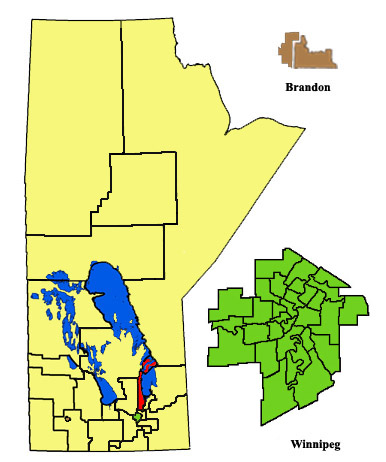
- Riding boundaries from 2011-2019.

Defunct provincial electoral district
- Legislature: Legislative Assembly of Manitoba
- District created: 1889
- First contested: 1889
- Last contested: 2016

Gimli was a provincial electoral district of Manitoba, Canada. It was created by redistribution in 1899, and existed continuously until the 2019 election. Following this, it was redistributed into the Interlake-Gimli electoral district.

Gimli was located to the immediate north of the city of Winnipeg. It was bordered to the north by Interlake, to the west by Interlake and Lakeside, and to the east by Lake Winnipeg and Selkirk.

Communities in the riding included Gimli, Winnipeg Beach, Petersfield, Clandeboye, and Matlock.

The riding's population in 1996 was 19,700. In 1999, the average family income was $58,790, and the unemployment rate was 7.90%. The service sector accounts for 15% of industry in the riding, with a further 11% each in manufacturing and the retail trade. There is also a significant fishing and tourism economy in the riding.

Gimli is home to the largest Icelandic community in the world outside Iceland, and many of its MLAs have been from this background. It also has significant Ukrainian and German communities, at 12% and 6% respectively.

Gimli was a "bellwether" riding, and has elected a candidate from a governing party in all but five elections since its establishment (the exceptions were 1907, 1920, 1922, 1936, and 1999).

== Members of the Legislative Assembly ==
Name	Party	Took office	Left office
Baldwin Baldwinson	Cons	1899	1907
Sigtryggur Jonasson	Lib	1907	1910
Baldwin Baldwinson	Cons	1910	1913
Edmund Taylor	Cons	1913	1914
Sveinn Thorvaldson	Cons	1914	1915
Taras Ferley	Lib	1915	1920
Gudmundur Fjelsted	Farmer	1920	1922
Michael Rojeski	Lib, later Independent	1922	1927
Ingimar Ingaldson	Prog	1927	1932
Einar Jonasson	Lib-Prog	1932	1935
Joseph Wawrykow	ILP/CCF	1936	1945
Steinn Thompson	Lib-Prog	1945	1958
George Johnson	PC	1958	1969
John Gottfried	NDP	1969	1977
Keith Cosens	PC	1977	1981
John Bucklaschuk	NDP	1981	1988
Ed Helwer	PC	1988	2003
Peter Bjornson	NDP	2003	2015
Jeff Wharton	PC	2016	2019

== Electoral results ==
=== 1899 ===
1899 Manitoba general election
Party	Candidate	Votes	%
Conservative	Baldwin Baldwinson	331	50.61
Liberal	Sigtryggur Jonasson	323	49.39
Total valid votes		654	–
Rejected		N/A	–
Eligible voters / Turnout		976	67.01
Source(s) Source: Manitoba. Chief Electoral Officer (1999). Statement of Votes for the 37th Provincial General Election, September 21, 1999 (PDF) (Report). Winnipeg: Elections Manitoba.

=== 1903 ===
1903 Manitoba general election
Party	Candidate	Votes	%	±%
Conservative	Baldwin Baldwinson	acclaimed	–	–
Total valid votes			–	–
Rejected		N/A	–	
Eligible voters / Turnout		N/A	–	–
Source(s) Source: Manitoba. Chief Electoral Officer (1999). Statement of Votes for the 37th Provincial General Election, September 21, 1999 (PDF) (Report). Winnipeg: Elections Manitoba.

=== 1907 ===
1907 Manitoba general election
Party	Candidate	Votes	%	±%
Liberal	Sigtryggur Jonasson	621	57.18	–
Conservative	Baldwin Baldwinson	465	42.82	–
Total valid votes		1,086	–	–
Rejected		N/A	–	
Eligible voters / Turnout		1,471	73.83	–
Source(s) Source: Manitoba. Chief Electoral Officer (1999). Statement of Votes for the 37th Provincial General Election, September 21, 1999 (PDF) (Report). Winnipeg: Elections Manitoba.

=== 1910 ===
1910 Manitoba general election
Party	Candidate	Votes	%	±%
Conservative	Baldwin Baldwinson	900	54.98	12.16
Liberal	W. H. Paulson	450	27.49	-29.69
Independent	J. Solmundson	287	17.53	–
Total valid votes		1,637	–	–
Rejected		N/A	–	
Eligible voters / Turnout		2,693	60.79	-13.04
Source(s) Source: Manitoba. Chief Electoral Officer (1999). Statement of Votes for the 37th Provincial General Election, September 21, 1999 (PDF) (Report). Winnipeg: Elections Manitoba.

=== 1913 by-election ===
Manitoba provincial by-election, 1913
Party	Candidate	Votes	%	±%
Conservative	Edmund L. Taylor	1,674	66.80	11.82
Liberal	Árni Eggertsson	832	33.20	5.71
Total valid votes		2,506	–	–
Rejected		N/A	–	
Eligible voters / Turnout		N/A	–	–
Source(s) Source: Manitoba. Chief Electoral Officer (1999). Statement of Votes for the 37th Provincial General Election, September 21, 1999 (PDF) (Report). Winnipeg: Elections Manitoba.

=== 1914 ===
1914 Manitoba general election
Party	Candidate	Votes	%	±%
Conservative	Sveinn Thorvaldson	1,045	59.04	-7.76
Liberal	Einar Jonasson	461	26.05	-7.16
Labour	Taras Ferley	264	14.92	–
Total valid votes		1,770	–	–
Rejected		N/A	–	
Eligible voters / Turnout		2,306	76.76	–
Source(s) Source: Manitoba. Chief Electoral Officer (1999). Statement of Votes for the 37th Provincial General Election, September 21, 1999 (PDF) (Report). Winnipeg: Elections Manitoba.

=== 1915 ===
1915 Manitoba general election
Party	Candidate	Votes	%	±%
Liberal	Taras Ferley	1,172	67.59	41.54
Conservative	Sveinn Thorvaldson	562	32.41	-26.63
Total valid votes		1,734	–	–
Rejected		N/A	–	
Eligible voters / Turnout		2,424	71.53	-5.22
Source(s) Source: Manitoba. Chief Electoral Officer (1999). Statement of Votes for the 37th Provincial General Election, September 21, 1999 (PDF) (Report). Winnipeg: Elections Manitoba.

=== 1920 ===
1920 Manitoba general election
Party	Candidate	Votes	%	±%
Farmer	Gudmundur Fjelsted	1,359	52.25	–
Liberal	Taras Ferley	1,242	47.75	-19.84
Total valid votes		2,601	–	–
Rejected		N/A	–	
Eligible voters / Turnout		4,219	61.65	-9.88
Source(s) Source: Manitoba. Chief Electoral Officer (1999). Statement of Votes for the 37th Provincial General Election, September 21, 1999 (PDF) (Report). Winnipeg: Elections Manitoba.

=== 1922 ===
1922 Manitoba general election
Party	Candidate	Votes	%	±%
Liberal	Michael Rojeski	1,570	52.63	4.88
United Farmers	Ingimar Ingaldson	1,310	43.92	–
Conservative	Elias Grabosky	103	3.45	–
Total valid votes		2,983	–	–
Rejected		N/A	–	
Eligible voters / Turnout		4,614	64.65	3.00
Source(s) Source: Manitoba. Chief Electoral Officer (1999). Statement of Votes for the 37th Provincial General Election, September 21, 1999 (PDF) (Report). Winnipeg: Elections Manitoba.

=== 1927 ===
1927 Manitoba general election
Party	Candidate	Votes	%	±%
Progressive	Ingimar Ingaldson	1,231	36.48	–
Liberal	Einar Jonasson	1,038	30.76	-21.87
Independent	Michael Rojeski	619	18.35	–
Independent	Nicholas Boychuk	238	7.05	–
Conservative	Gisli Sigmundson	199	5.90	2.45
Independent	Dmytro Derhak	49	1.45	–
Total valid votes		3,374	–	–
Rejected		N/A	–	
Eligible voters / Turnout		5,505	61.29	-3.36
Source(s) Source: Manitoba. Chief Electoral Officer (1999). Statement of Votes for the 37th Provincial General Election, September 21, 1999 (PDF) (Report). Winnipeg: Elections Manitoba.

=== 1932 ===
1932 Manitoba general election
Party	Candidate	Votes	%	±%
Liberal–Progressive	Einar Jonasson	1,704	34.63	–
Liberal–Progressive	Ingimar Ingaldson	1,410	28.66	–
Conservative	Gunnar Thorvaldson	858	17.44	11.54
Independent	Iwan Kapusta	716	14.55	–
Independent	Michael Ewanchuk	232	4.72	–
Total valid votes		4,920	–	–
Rejected		N/A	–	
Eligible voters / Turnout		5,174	95.09	33.80
Source(s) Source: Manitoba. Chief Electoral Officer (1999). Statement of Votes for the 37th Provincial General Election, September 21, 1999 (PDF) (Report). Winnipeg: Elections Manitoba.

=== 1936 ===
1936 Manitoba general election
Party	Candidate	Votes	%	±%
Independent Labour	Joseph Wawrykow	1,577	39.19	–
Liberal–Progressive	B. J. Lifman	1,285	31.93	-31.36
Social Credit	Asta Austmann Oddson	1,033	25.67	–
Conservative	Stephen Adolph Magnacca	129	3.21	-14.23
Total valid votes		4,024	–	–
Rejected		72	–	
Eligible voters / Turnout		5,780	70.87	-24.23
Source(s) Source: Manitoba. Chief Electoral Officer (1999). Statement of Votes for the 37th Provincial General Election, September 21, 1999 (PDF) (Report). Winnipeg: Elections Manitoba.

=== 1941 ===
1941 Manitoba general election
Party	Candidate	Votes	%	±%
Co-operative Commonwealth	Joseph Wawrykow	2,666	55.27	–
Liberal–Progressive	Sigurdur Victor Sigurdson	2,111	43.76	11.83
Independent	James Grant	47	0.97	–
Total valid votes		4,824	–	–
Rejected		48	–	
Eligible voters / Turnout		6,163	79.05	8.19
Source(s) Source: Manitoba. Chief Electoral Officer (1999). Statement of Votes for the 37th Provincial General Election, September 21, 1999 (PDF) (Report). Winnipeg: Elections Manitoba.

=== 1945 ===
1945 Manitoba general election
Party	Candidate	Votes	%	±%
Liberal–Progressive	Steinn O. Thompson	2,133	55.90	12.14
Co-operative Commonwealth	Snabjorn S. Johnson	1,437	37.66	-17.61
Labor–Progressive	Mitchell John "Mitch" Sago	246	6.45	–
Total valid votes		3,816	–	–
Rejected		34	–	
Eligible voters / Turnout		6,050	63.64	-15.42
Source(s) Source: Manitoba. Chief Electoral Officer (1999). Statement of Votes for the 37th Provincial General Election, September 21, 1999 (PDF) (Report). Winnipeg: Elections Manitoba.

=== 1949 ===
1949 Manitoba general election
Party	Candidate	Votes	%	±%
Liberal–Progressive	Steinn O. Thompson	acclaimed	–	–
Total valid votes			–	–
Rejected		N/A	–	
Eligible voters / Turnout		5,692	–	-63.64
Source(s) Source: Manitoba. Chief Electoral Officer (1999). Statement of Votes for the 37th Provincial General Election, September 21, 1999 (PDF) (Report). Winnipeg: Elections Manitoba.

=== 1953 ===
1953 Manitoba general election
Party	Candidate	Votes	%	±%
Liberal–Progressive	Steinn O. Thompson	2,252	67.97	–
Social Credit	Elmer Henry Fitch	867	26.17	–
Independent Liberal	John Firman	194	5.86	–
Total valid votes		3,313	–	–
Rejected		48	–	
Eligible voters / Turnout		6,207	54.15	54.15
Source(s) Source: Manitoba. Chief Electoral Officer (1999). Statement of Votes for the 37th Provincial General Election, September 21, 1999 (PDF) (Report). Winnipeg: Elections Manitoba.

=== 1958 ===
1958 Manitoba general election
Party	Candidate	Votes	%	±%
Progressive Conservative	George Johnson	1,988	46.06	–
Liberal–Progressive	Steinn O. Thompson	1,374	31.84	-36.14
Co-operative Commonwealth	Sigurdur Wopnfjord	954	22.10	–
Total valid votes		4,316	–	–
Rejected		37	–	
Eligible voters / Turnout		6,297	69.13	14.98
Source(s) Source: Manitoba. Chief Electoral Officer (1999). Statement of Votes for the 37th Provincial General Election, September 21, 1999 (PDF) (Report). Winnipeg: Elections Manitoba.

=== 1959 ===
1959 Manitoba general election
Party	Candidate	Votes	%	±%
Progressive Conservative	George Johnson	2,570	57.00	10.94
Liberal–Progressive	Alex Hawrysh	1,007	22.33	-9.50
Co-operative Commonwealth	Zado Zator	932	20.67	-1.43
Total valid votes		4,509	–	–
Rejected		30	–	
Eligible voters / Turnout		6,567	69.12	-0.01
Source(s) Source: Manitoba. Chief Electoral Officer (1999). Statement of Votes for the 37th Provincial General Election, September 21, 1999 (PDF) (Report). Winnipeg: Elections Manitoba.

=== 1962 ===
1962 Manitoba general election
Party	Candidate	Votes	%	±%
Progressive Conservative	George Johnson	2,316	57.51	0.51
New Democratic	Magnus Eliason	917	22.77	–
Liberal	Don Martin	794	19.72	–
Total valid votes		4,027	–	–
Rejected		24	–	
Eligible voters / Turnout		6,212	65.21	-3.91
Source(s) Source: Manitoba. Chief Electoral Officer (1999). Statement of Votes for the 37th Provincial General Election, September 21, 1999 (PDF) (Report). Winnipeg: Elections Manitoba.

=== 1966 ===
1966 Manitoba general election
Party	Candidate	Votes	%	±%
Progressive Conservative	George Johnson	1,981	52.56	-4.95
Liberal	Gunnar O. Eggertson	1,021	27.09	7.37
New Democratic	Zado Zator	767	20.35	-2.42
Total valid votes		3,769	–	–
Rejected		18	–	
Eligible voters / Turnout		6,435	58.85	-6.36
Source(s) Source: Manitoba. Chief Electoral Officer (1999). Statement of Votes for the 37th Provincial General Election, September 21, 1999 (PDF) (Report). Winnipeg: Elections Manitoba.

=== 1969 ===
1969 Manitoba general election
Party	Candidate	Votes	%	±%
New Democratic	John Gottfried	2,159	37.50	17.15
Progressive Conservative	Eric Stefanson Sr.	1,936	33.62	-18.94
Liberal	Walter John Griffin	1,663	28.88	1.79
Total valid votes		5,758	–	–
Rejected		25	–	
Eligible voters / Turnout		8,362	69.16	10.31
Source(s) Source: Manitoba. Chief Electoral Officer (1999). Statement of Votes for the 37th Provincial General Election, September 21, 1999 (PDF) (Report). Winnipeg: Elections Manitoba.

=== 1973 ===
1973 Manitoba general election
Party	Candidate	Votes	%	±%
New Democratic	John Gottfried	3,546	49.25	11.75
Progressive Conservative	Edward Turner "Ted" Revel	3,490	48.47	14.85
Independent	Charles Arnason	164	2.28	–
Total valid votes		7,200	–	–
Rejected		72	–	
Eligible voters / Turnout		8,903	81.68	12.52
Source(s) Source: Manitoba. Chief Electoral Officer (1999). Statement of Votes for the 37th Provincial General Election, September 21, 1999 (PDF) (Report). Winnipeg: Elections Manitoba.

=== 1977 ===
1977 Manitoba general election
Party	Candidate	Votes	%	±%
Progressive Conservative	Keith Cosens	4,515	54.33	5.86
New Democratic	George B. Schreyer	3,795	45.67	-3.58
Total valid votes		8,310	–	–
Rejected		29	–	
Eligible voters / Turnout		9,849	84.67	2.99
Source(s) Source: Manitoba. Chief Electoral Officer (1999). Statement of Votes for the 37th Provincial General Election, September 21, 1999 (PDF) (Report). Winnipeg: Elections Manitoba.

=== 1981 ===
1981 Manitoba general election
Party	Candidate	Votes	%	±%
New Democratic	John Bucklaschuk	4,825	52.31	6.65
Progressive Conservative	Keith Cosens	3,995	43.32	-11.02
Liberal	Allan Chambers	276	2.99	–
Progressive	Pat Bazan	127	1.38	–
Total valid votes		9,223	–	–
Rejected		35	–	
Eligible voters / Turnout		11,909	77.74	-6.93
Source(s) Source: Manitoba. Chief Electoral Officer (1999). Statement of Votes for the 37th Provincial General Election, September 21, 1999 (PDF) (Report). Winnipeg: Elections Manitoba.

=== 1986 ===
1986 Manitoba general election
Party	Candidate	Votes	%	±%
New Democratic	John Bucklaschuk	4,906	50.83	-1.48
Progressive Conservative	Ed Helwer	3,955	40.98	-2.34
Liberal	Morley Murray	649	6.72	3.73
WCC	Neil Knight	141	1.46	–
Total valid votes		9,651	–	–
Rejected		17	–	
Eligible voters / Turnout		12,862	75.17	-2.57
Source(s) Source: Manitoba. Chief Electoral Officer (1999). Statement of Votes for the 37th Provincial General Election, September 21, 1999 (PDF) (Report). Winnipeg: Elections Manitoba.

=== 1988 ===
1988 Manitoba general election
Party	Candidate	Votes	%	±%
Progressive Conservative	Ed Helwer	4,716	44.17	3.19
New Democratic	John Bucklaschuk	3,352	31.40	-19.44
Liberal	Morley Murray	2,347	21.98	15.26
Western Independence	Eugene Klochko	261	2.44	–
Total valid votes		10,676	–	–
Rejected		13	–	
Eligible voters / Turnout		13,541	78.94	3.77
Source(s) Source: Manitoba. Chief Electoral Officer (1999). Statement of Votes for the 37th Provincial General Election, September 21, 1999 (PDF) (Report). Winnipeg: Elections Manitoba.

=== 1990 ===
1990 Manitoba general election
Party	Candidate	Votes	%	±%
Progressive Conservative	Ed Helwer	5,118	52.43	8.25
New Democratic	Tom Hughes	2,666	27.31	-4.09
Liberal	Darlene Skaritko	1,978	20.26	-1.72
Total valid votes		9,762	–	–
Rejected		28	–	
Eligible voters / Turnout		13,598	72.00	-6.94
Source(s) Source: Manitoba. Chief Electoral Officer (1999). Statement of Votes for the 37th Provincial General Election, September 21, 1999 (PDF) (Report). Winnipeg: Elections Manitoba.

=== 1995 ===
1995 Manitoba general election
Party	Candidate	Votes	%	±%
Progressive Conservative	Ed Helwer	5,591	50.65	-1.78
New Democratic	Fran Frederickson	3,746	33.93	6.62
Liberal	Donald Glen "Don" Forfar	1,702	15.42	-4.84
Total valid votes		11,039	–	–
Rejected		40	–	
Eligible voters / Turnout		14,758	75.07	3.08
Source(s) Source: Manitoba. Chief Electoral Officer (1999). Statement of Votes for the 37th Provincial General Election, September 21, 1999 (PDF) (Report). Winnipeg: Elections Manitoba.

=== 1999 ===
1999 Manitoba general election
Party	Candidate	Votes	%	±%	Expenditures
Progressive Conservative	Ed Helwer	5,488	47.34	-3.31	$29,615.58
New Democratic	Fran Frederickson	5,086	43.87	9.94	$29,695.00
Liberal	Pat Carroll	1,019	8.79	-6.63	$10,777.10
Total valid votes		11,593	–	–	
Rejected		58	–		
Eligible voters / turnout		14,948	77.94	2.87	
Source(s) Source: Manitoba. Chief Electoral Officer (1999). Statement of Votes for the 37th Provincial General Election, September 21, 1999 (PDF) (Report). Winnipeg: Elections Manitoba.

=== 2003 ===
2003 Manitoba general election
Party	Candidate	Votes	%	±%
New Democratic	Peter Bjornson	5,500	56.56	12.68
Progressive Conservative	Vern Sabeski	3,651	37.54	-9.80
Liberal	Lynn Clark	574	5.90	-2.89
Total valid votes		9,725	–	–
Rejected		33	–	
Eligible voters / Turnout		15,809	61.72	-16.22
Source(s) Source: Manitoba. Chief Electoral Officer (2003). Statement of Votes for the 38th Provincial General Election, June 3, 2003 (PDF) (Report). Winnipeg: Elections Manitoba.

=== 2007 ===
2007 Manitoba general election
Party	Candidate	Votes	%	±%	Expenditures
New Democratic	Peter Bjornson	5,946	58.74	2.18	$24,714.95
Progressive Conservative	Chris Bourgeois	3,450	34.08	-3.46	$27,803.47
Liberal	Lynn Greenberg	727	7.18	1.28	$763.27
Total valid votes		10,123	–	–	
Rejected		53	–		
Eligible voters / turnout		16,175	62.91	1.19	
Source(s) Source: Manitoba. Chief Electoral Officer (2007). Statement of Votes for the 39th Provincial General Election, May 22, 2007 (PDF) (Report). Winnipeg: Elections Manitoba.

=== 2011 ===
2011 Manitoba general election
Party	Candidate	Votes	%	±%	Expenditures
New Democratic	Peter Bjornson	5,012	51.52	-7.22	$37,146.57
Progressive Conservative	Jeff Wharton	4,210	43.28	9.20	$34,709.30
Green	Glenda Whiteman	309	3.18	–	$1,012.25
Liberal	Lawrence Einarsson	197	2.03	-5.16	$0.00
Total valid votes		9,728	–	–	
Rejected		17	–		
Eligible voters / turnout		14,769	65.98	3.07	
Source(s) Source: Manitoba. Chief Electoral Officer (2011). Statement of Votes for the 40th Provincial General Election, October 4, 2011 (PDF) (Report). Winnipeg: Elections Manitoba. "Election Returns: 40th General Election". Elections Manitoba. 2011.

=== 2016 ===
2016 Manitoba general election
Party	Candidate	Votes	%	±%
Progressive Conservative	Jeff Wharton	5,614	60.53	17.25
New Democratic	Armand Bélanger	2,579	27.81	-23.72
Green	Dwight Harfield	843	9.09	5.91
Manitoba	Ed Paquette	239	2.58	–
Total valid votes		9,275	–	–
Rejected		108	–	
Eligible voters / turnout		14,226	65.96	-0.03
Source(s) Source: Manitoba. Chief Electoral Officer (2016). Statement of Votes for the 41st Provincial General Election, April 19, 2016 (PDF) (Report). Winnipeg: Elections Manitoba. "Election Returns: 41st General Election". Elections Manitoba. 2016.

== Previous boundaries ==
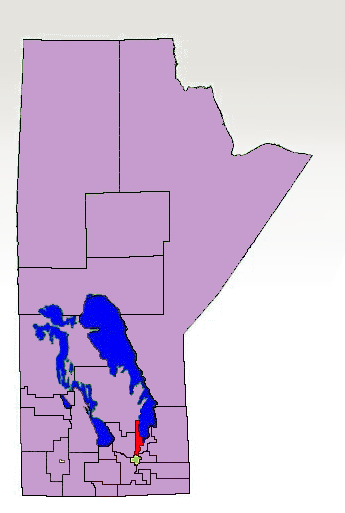
The 1998–2011 boundaries for Gimli highlighted in red.

== See also ==
- List of Manitoba provincial electoral districts
- Canadian provincial electoral districts
