= Ingimar Ingaldson =

Canadian politician

Ingmar Ingaldson (April 4, 1888—September 21, 1934) was a politician in Manitoba, Canada. He served in the Legislative Assembly of Manitoba from 1927 to 1932, as a member of the Progressive Party.

He was born in Hallson, North Dakota, in the United States of America, to parents of Icelandic origin. He came to Canada in 1901, and was educated at the Manitoba Agricultural College. He served as manager of several local cooperatives, including the North Star Co-operative Creamery and Arborg Farmers Co-operative Association Ltd. In 1913, Ingaldson married Violet Palson. From 1917 to 1926, he served as secretary-treasurer of the Rural Municipality of Bifrost. He was also active in drama, and took part in several plays in the region.

He first ran for the Manitoba legislature in the 1922 provincial election as a candidate of the United Farmers of Manitoba. He lost to Liberal Michael Rojeski in the constituency of Gimli by 260 votes.

Ingaldson ran again in the 1927 election as a Progressive, and defeated Liberal candidate Einar Jonasson by 225 votes (Rojeski, now an independent, finished third). The Progressives won a majority government, and Ingaldson served as a backbench supporter of John Bracken's administration. In 1930, he visited Iceland as a representative of the Manitoba government for the nation's millennial celebrations.

In 1932, the Progressive and Liberal parties formed an electoral alliance to prevent the Conservatives from forming government. Despite the provincial alliance, however, Jonasson again challenged Ingaldson in Gimli. Jonasson won the challenge by 271 votes, with both candidates proclaiming support for Bracken's government.

Ingaldson died two years later in a drowning accident.
