= Gunnar Thorvaldson =

Canadian politician (1901–1969)

Gunnar Solmunder (Solly) Thorvaldson, QC (March 18, 1901 – August 2, 1969) was a politician in Manitoba, Canada. He served in the Legislative Assembly of Manitoba from 1941 to 1949, and in the Senate of Canada from 1958 until his death. Originally elected as a Conservative, he sat as a Progressive Conservative after the party changed its name in 1943.

Thorvaldson was born in Riverton, Manitoba to a notable Icelandic-Canadian family. His father, Sveinn Thorvaldson, was also a Conservative member of the Assembly from 1914 to 1915.

His nephew Scott Thorkelson served in the Canadian House of Commons.

== Career ==
He received a Bachelor of Arts degree from the University of Saskatchewan in 1922 and a law degree from the Manitoba Law School in 1925. He worked as a barrister. Thorvaldson was also president of the Income Tax Payer's Association from 1944 to 1946, and was a member of the Manitoba Club, the Empire Club and the Optimist Club. In 1926, he married Edna Schwitzer, daughter of John Edward Schwitzer.

== Elections ==
He ran for the Manitoba legislature in the constituency of Gimli in the 1932 provincial election, but finished third against Liberal Einar Jonasson.

Thorvaldson ran for the House of Commons of Canada in the 1935 federal election as a candidate of the Conservative Party of Canada. He lost, finishing a distant second against Liberal-Progressive candidate Joseph T. Thorson in the riding of Selkirk.

He ran for the Manitoba legislature for the second time in the 1936 provincial election, this time campaigning in the constituency of Winnipeg, which elected ten members by a single transferable ballot. He finished twelfth on the first count, did poorly on transfers and was eliminated on the eleventh ballot.

Thorvaldson was finally successful on his fourth attempt at elected office, in the 1941 provincial election. He again ran in Winnipeg, and this time finishing seventh on the first count. Subsequent counts confirmed his position, and he was finally declared elected on the nineteenth ballot. The Liberal-Progressives and Conservatives were partners in a coalition government during this period, and Thorvaldson served as a backbench supporter of the ministries of John Bracken and Stuart Garson.

He was re-elected in the 1945 election, finishing eighth on the first count and securing election on the fifteenth ballot.

Thorvaldson resigned his provincial seat in 1949 to campaign as the Progressive Conservative candidate for Winnipeg South in the Canadian federal election of 1949. He was defeated by Liberal Leslie Alexander Mutch, and did seek a return to elected office.

== Appointments ==
Thorvaldson was appointed a King's Counsel in 1942. In 1954-55, he became the first lawyer to serve as president of the Canadian Chamber of Commerce.

In 1958, Thorvaldson was appointed to the Canadian Senate by Prime Minister John Diefenbaker. He served as president of the Progressive Conservative Party of Canada from 1959 to 1963, and was named to Canada's United Nations delegation. In 1968, he was awarded the Order of the Falcon by the President of Iceland.

== Death ==
Thorvaldson died at the age of 68 of a heart attack while golfing in Winnipeg.
