= Richard Craig (politician) =

Canadian lawyer and politician (1877–1966)

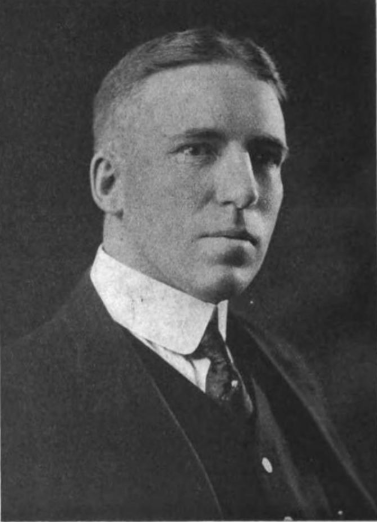

Attorney General of Manitoba
- In office August 8, 1922 – 1927
- Premier: John Bracken
- Preceded by: Robert Jacob
- Succeeded by: William James Major

Member of the Legislative Assembly of Manitoba
- In office 1922–1927

Personal details
- Born: August 26, 1877 Underwood, Ontario, Canada
- Died: July 16, 1966 (aged 88) Vancouver, British Columbia, Canada
- Party: Conservative (before 1922); Progressive (after 1922)
- Education: University of Manitoba (AB, LLB)

Richard W. Craig (August 26, 1877 – July 16, 1966) was a Canadian lawyer and politician who served in the Legislative Assembly of Manitoba from 1922 to 1927. For part of this time he served as a cabinet minister in the government of John Bracken.

== Early life and education ==
Craig was born in Underwood, Ontario, and was educated in Port Elgin and Winnipeg. He received a Bachelor of Arts degree in 1897 and an LL.B. degree in 1904, both from the University of Manitoba. Craig was called to the Manitoba bar the following year.

== Career ==
He worked as a barrister-at-law, and was appointed to the bench of the Law Society of Manitoba in 1916. From 1912 to 1916, he was Crown Prosecutor for the city of Winnipeg. In 1916, he was named King's Counsel. Craig also served as chair of the Winnipeg School Board, the Social Service Council of Canada, and the Winnipeg Canadian Club.

Craig was initially Conservative, and endorsed the Manitoba Conservative Party in the 1915 election on the grounds that it was more supportive of higher education than was the Manitoba Liberal Party. He later left the Conservatives, and was elected to Manitoba's legislature in the 1922 provincial election as a candidate of the newly formed Progressive Association in Winnipeg. During this period, Winnipeg was a single constituency which elected ten members via a single transferable ballot. Despite finishing twelfth in the count of first preferences and being in the middle of the pack for much of the counting process, his voting totals stayed solid till the end when he was declared elected. Eight Progressive candidates ran in Winnipeg, but Craig was the only one elected.

Winnipeg's Progressive MLA aligned with the United Farmers of Manitoba (UFM), which swept the rural constituencies to emerge as the largest party in the legislature. The Progressive party was a force in federal politics at this time and the UFM took the name the Progressive, when it formed government. As the government's only Winnipeg representative, Craig was assured of a cabinet position. He was appointed as the province's Attorney General on August 8, 1922.

Craig emerged as Premier John Bracken's most trusted confidante during the parliament that followed, and became known as the government's strongest voice in the legislature. Like the premier, Craig believed that Manitoba should be governed in a non-partisan, efficient and business-like manner. On January 12, 1925, he was given a secondary portfolio of Minister of Telephones and Telegraphs.

Although a successful minister and a young man, Craig chose to retire from the legislature after only a single term. He resumed his practice as a lawyer, and provided legal services for Bracken's ministry in 1929.

== Personal life ==
Craig was married to Marguerite Maud Hogg. He died in Victoria, British Columbia at the age of 88 in 1966.
