= 1922 Manitoba general election =

- July 18, 1922

55 seats of the Legislative Assembly of Manitoba 27 seats needed for a majority
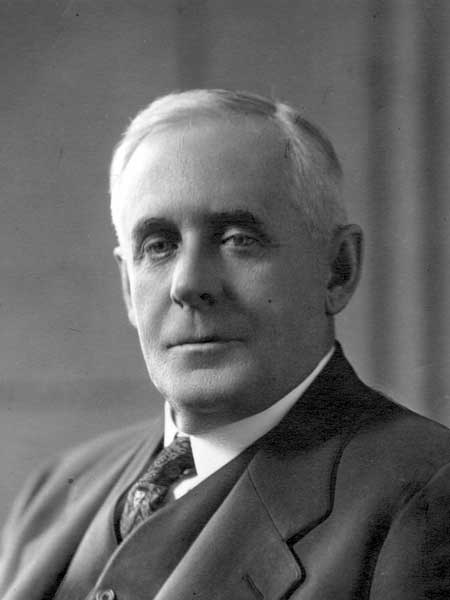
	First party	Second party
Leader	none	Tobias Norris
Party	Progressive (United Farmers of Manitoba)	Liberal
Leader since		1910
Leader's seat		Lansdowne
Last election	10	21
Seats won	28	8
Seat change	▲18	▼13
Popular vote	49,767	35,225
Percentage	32.8%	23.2%
Swing	▲18.7pp	▼11.9pp
	Third party	Fourth party
Leader	Fawcett Taylor	Fred Dixon
Party	Conservative	Dominion Labour
Leader since	April 5, 1922	March 1918
Leader's seat	Portage la Prairie	Winnipeg
Last election	8	8
Seats won	7	5
Seat change	▼1	▼3
Popular vote	23,539	16,781
Percentage	15.5%	11.1%
Swing	▼2.0pp	▼5.2pp
Premier before election
Tobias Norris
Liberal
Premier after election
John Bracken
Progressive

The 1922 Manitoba general election was held on July 18, 1922 to elect Members of the Legislative Assembly of the Province of Manitoba, Canada. The United Farmers of Manitoba won a narrow majority in the legislature.

As in the previous election of 1920, the city of Winnipeg elected ten members by the single transferable ballot. All other constituencies elected one member by first-past-the-post balloting. Before the next election, the 1927 Manitoba general election, the districts outside Winnipeg switched to Instant-runoff voting.

== Summary ==
This election was a watershed moment in Manitoba's political history. Since the formal introduction of partisan government in 1888, Manitoba had been governed alternately by the Liberal Party and the Conservative Party. Although the previous election of 1920 sustained the Liberals in power, it also saw the two-party dichotomy weakened by the rise of farmer and labour parliamentary blocs. Having a minority government, the Liberals did not have control of the majority in the Legislature and therefore had to depend on support from other parties to remain in power. The support had been there until MLA P.A. Talbot learned that the government had not abolished the public utilities commission as a majority of MLAs had voted for in the first season of the government. He proposed a vote of censure on the government, and when that passed, Premier Norris's cabinet resigned.

In 1922, the two old parties were mostly swept away by the United Farmers of Manitoba (UFM). The UFM and Progressives candidates won 25 seats out of 52. (Elections in three northern districts were deferred due to logistical reasons but eventually won by the UFM as well.)

The UFM had existed for several years as a farmer's organization, but some of its members ran as "Independent-Farmers" in the 1920 election. In 1921, however, the UFM announced it would field candidates during the 1922 campaign. The UFM was opposed to partisanship, and its most prominent members insisted that it was not a "party" in the traditional sense. UFM candidates often highlighted their lack of experience in partisan politics and promised to govern the province in a restrained and responsible manner if elected to office.

The UFM membership and its candidates were heterogeneous. Although many supporters were free-trade agrarian Liberals before 1920, some had been Conservatives. Some prominent UFM figures were also notable members of Manitoba's francophone community, which generally had supported the Conservative Party before 1920.

The United Farmers fielded candidates in rural constituencies and also endorsed candidates of the Progressive Association running in Winnipeg. Even with these endorsements, the UFM fielded candidates in only two-thirds of the ridings. Although running their campaign on a shoestring budget, the UFM and Progressives scored a major upset, winning 25 seats out of 52. Its showing was strengthened when it won three additional seats in the deferred elections, putting its total at 28 out of 55, a slight majority and 20 seats more than the largest opposition caucus in the legislature.

Not even the UFM had expected to win government. Indeed, its expectations were so low that it did not have a formal leader during the campaign. Thus, when the UFM caucus met after the election, its first task was to choose a leader who would become premier. Thomas Crerar and Robert Hoey declined invitations to govern, and the caucus turned to John Bracken, president of the Manitoba Agricultural College. Although he had no political experience, Bracken accepted the appointment. He ran in one of the deferred elections, in The Pas, and was elected.

The UFM also won the deferred elections in Ethelbert and Rupertsland. This gave the government a majority of just one seat. The UFM's political arm branded itself as the Progressive Party of Manitoba.

The other parties fared poorly in the 1922 campaign. The Liberals, led by outgoing premier Tobias Norris, fell from twenty-one seats to eight. The Conservatives, under their newly chosen leader Fawcett Taylor, fell from eight seats to seven.

The Independent Labour Party also experienced difficulties. In the 1920 election, Manitoba's various left-wing and working-class groups submerged their differences to run a united campaign. This co-operation was successful, and eleven labour candidates were elected to form the second-largest parliamentary bloc, four of them in Winnipeg where STV was used. By the 1922 election, however, the Labour Party was beset by long-standing divisions among socialists, communists and conservative trade unionists.

A total of thirteen labour candidates ran for ten seats in Winnipeg. Six were members of the ILP, and a seventh, former Social Democrat John Queen, ran as an "Independent Workers" candidate allied with the ILP. The other candidates were divided among themselves. The banned Communist Party ran three candidates under its legal front, the Workers Party. These candidates disrupted meetings of Socialist incumbent George Armstrong, and accused him of selling out his principles to moderates and social gospellers. Two conservative trade-unionists also ran as Union Labour candidates, opposing radicalism in the labour movement.

Five ILP candidates were elected, and John Queen was also elected in Winnipeg. Labour leader Fred Dixon topped the poll in Winnipeg for a second time, although by a reduced margin from 1920. George Armstrong lost his Winnipeg seat, and no other labour candidates were elected. Six independent candidates were also elected.

The Progressives would go on to govern Manitoba alone until 1932, when they joined forces with the Liberals to form the "Liberal-Progressive Party." The Liberal-Progressives would go on to govern Manitoba, either alone or in coalition, until 1959.

== Results ==
Summary of the 1922 election results for the 17th Manitoba Legislature
Party	Party leader	Candidates	Seats			Popular vote (Note: includes first-preference votes in Winnipeg STV count)				
Party	Party leader	Candidates	1920	1922	+/—	1920	1922	+/—	%	Change
Progressive	none	49	10	28	+18	20,299	49,767	+29,468	32.8%	+18.7%
Liberal	Tobias Norris	38	21	8	-13	50,422	35,225	-15,197	23.2%	-11.9%
Conservative	Fawcett Taylor	26	8	7	-1	25,083	23,539	-1,544	15.5%	-2.0%
Dominion Labour Party	Fred Dixon	12	8	5	-3	23,390	16,781	-6,609	11.1%	-5.2%
Independent		20	1	5	+4	14,145	15,434	+1,289	10.2%	+0.4%
Moderation League	J.K. Downes	1	–	1	+1	–	3,621	+3,621	2.8%	n/a
Independent Workers	John Queen (Note: elected in 1920 under the Social Democratic ticket)	1	1	1	–	1,253	2,348	+1,095	2.7%	+1.8%
Brandon Labour Party	Albert Edward Smith	1	1	–	-1	2,007	2,060	+53	1.4%	–
Labour		5	–	–	–	–	1,728	+1,728	1.1%	n/a
Socialist	George Armstrong	1	1	–	-1	2,767	1,271	-1,496	0.8%	-1.1%
Independent Farmer		–	3	–	-3	2,863	–	-2,863	–	n/a
Independent-Conservative		–	1	–	-1	1,434	–	-1,434	–	n/a
Totals		154	55	55	–	143,663	151,774	+8,111	100.0%	–
Registered voters and turnout						209,760	222,499	+12,739	69.4%	-1.2%

Popular vote
Progressive	32.79%
Liberal	23.21%
Conservative	15.51%
DLP	11.06%
Others	17.43%

Seats summary
Progressive	50.91%
Liberal	14.55%
Conservative	12.73%
DLP	9.09%
Others	12.73%

=== Rural Manitoba ===
Electoral district	Candidates					Incumbent
Electoral district	Progressive	Liberal	Conservative	Labour	Other	Incumbent
Arthur	Duncan Lloyd McLeod; 1130	John Williams; 777				John Williams
Beautiful Plains	George Little; 1534	James A. Dempsey; 429	Richard E. Coad; 939			George Little
Birtle	William Short; 1307	William Iverbach; 710				George Malcolm
Brandon City				Albert Edward Smith (Brandon Labour Party/CLP); 2060	John Edmison (Ind); 3281	Albert Edward Smith
Carillon	Albert Prefontaine; 1010				Maurice Duprey (Ind); 694	Maurice Duprey
Cypress	John Alexander Young; 1205		William Spinks; 1252			William Spinks
Dauphin	Henry Pears Nicholson; 658	Archibald Esplen; 825		George Palmer (ILP); 742		George Palmer
Deloraine	Duncan Stuart McLeod; 1012	Robert Thornton; 810	William Chalmers; 829			Robert Thornton
Dufferin	William Brown; 1645				Herbert Robinson (Ind); 1504	Edward August
Emerson	Robert Curran; 566	H. Stewart; 435	D.H. McFadden; 567		Dmytro Yakimischak (Ind. Farmer); 998	Dmytro Yakimischak
Fairford	G.L. Marron; 398	Albert Kirvan; 810				Albert Kirvan
Fisher	Nicholas Bachynsky; 581	John Garfield Hamilton; 262			Henry L. Mabb (Ind); 354	Henry L. Mabb
Gilbert Plains	Arthur Berry; 1034	George Darling Shortreed; 317			Horace Priestly Barrett (Ind); 499	William Findlater
Gimli	Ingimar Ingaldson; 1310	Michael Rojeski; 1570	Elias Grabosky; 103			Gudmundur Fjelsted
Gladstone	Albert McGregor; 1527	David Smith; 649	F.J. Erick Rhind; 387			James Armstrong
Glenwood	Wellington Geddas Rathwell; 950	James Breakey; 1468				William Robson; Ind. Farmer
Hamiota	Thomas Wolstenholme; 1338	John Henry McConnell; 935				John Henry McConnell
Iberville	Arthur Boivin; 902	H.A. Mullins; 290				Arthur Boivin
Killarney	Andrew Foster; 949	Thomas H. Buck; 394	G.W. Waldon; 747			Samuel Fletcher
Lakeside	Douglas Campbell; 1591		Herbert Muir; 1101			Charles Duncan McPherson
Lansdowne	John Morrison Allen; 1219	Tobias Norris; 1680				Tobias Norris
La Verendrye	Philippe Adjutor Talbot; 1134	L.P. Roy; 694				Philippe Adjutor Talbot
Manitou	George Compton; 1049	G.E. Davidson; 531	John Ridley; 1018		Joseph B. Lane (Ind); 548	John Ridley
Minnedosa	Neil Cameron; 1966	A.W. Shaw; 1160				George Grierson
Morden and Rhineland	John Sweet; 960		John Kennedy; 1297			John Kennedy
Morris	William Clubb; 1222	Alex Ayotte; 751				William Clubb
Mountain	Charles Cannon; 1580	James Baird; 968	George M. Fraser; 578			James Baird
Norfolk	John Muirhead; 1279		Reuben J. Waugh; 1142			Reuben J. Waugh
Portage la Prairie		Charles D. McPherson; 1307	Fawcett Taylor; 1436			Fawcett Taylor
Roblin	Henry Richardson; 1176		Fred Newton; 1185			Henry Richardson
Rockwood	William McKinnell; 1374		Harvey Hicks; 706		Robert William Rutherford (Ind); 703	William McKinnell
Russell	Isaac Griffiths; 1177	William W.W. Wilson; 783	Edgar Carnegy De Balinhard; 741			William W.W. Wilson
St. George	Albert E. Kristjansson; 860	Skuli Sigfusson; 1512				Albert E. Kristjansson
Ste. Rose	Thomas McDonald; 1272				Joseph Hamelin (Ind); 1362	Joseph Hamelin
Swan River	Robert Emmond; 1320		Daniel Hawe Sr. 548			Robert Emmond
Turtle Mountain	R.W. Ramson; 955		Richard G. Willis; 1059			George William McDonald
Virden	Robert Mooney; 1638	George Clingan; 961				George Clingan

=== Winnipeg suburbs ===
Electoral district	Candidates					Incumbent
Electoral district	Progressive	Liberal	Conservative	Labour	Other	Incumbent
Assiniboia	Charles L. Richardson; 999			William Bayley (ILP); 1844	William Bourke (Ind); 843; John Haddon (Ind); 494	William Bayley
Kildonan & St. Andrews	Samuel Henry Summerscales; 828	Free Larter; 977		Charles Albert Tanner (ILP); 1453		Charles Albert Tanner
St. Boniface		H.M. Sutherland; 1176		Charles W. Foster (ILP); 1124	Joseph Bernier (Ind); 2024	Joseph Bernier
St. Clements	Hugh Connolly; 532			Nicolas Kolisynk (Workers); 387; Matthew Stanbridge (ILP); 352	Donald Ross (Ind); 1245	Matthew Stanbridge
Springfield	Clifford Barclay; 1014	William James Black; 854	Samuel Leonard Henry; 365			Arthur Moore

=== Winnipeg ===
Final results for Winnipeg: Liberal 2, Conservative 2, ILP 3, Moderation League 1, Independent Worker 1, Progressive Party 1

Valid votes: 44,328 Quota: 4030

Two were elected in the first count by achieving quota. One of them, Jacob, received votes exactly equal to quota. Three were elected at the end when the field of candidates was thinned to the number of remaining open seats. Their vote tallies never did come up to quota.

Eight of the front runners in the first count were elected so vote transfers affected the outcome for just two of the ten. The elected representation was more mixed and balanced than the result had been under first past the post in the two-member districts that had been in use in Winnipeg previously.

1922 election - Winnipeg (listed in order of 1st preference votes; number in brackets is the order in which elected)
Party	Candidate	Maximum round	Maximum votes	Share in maximum round	Maximum votes First round votes Transfer votes
Independent Labour	(incumbent)Fred Dixon (1)	1	7,971	18.0%	
Liberal	Robert Jacob (2)	1	4,030	9.1%	
Moderation League	J.K. Downes (3)	11	4,053	9.2%	
Conservative	William Sanford Evans (4)	33	4,634	10.6%	
Conservative	(incumbent)John Thomas Haig (5)	34	4,245	9.7%	
Independent Workers	(incumbent)John Queen (6)	36	4,045	9.3%	
Liberal	(incumbent)Edith Rogers (9)	37	3,485	8.3%	
Liberal	(incumbent)Duncan Cameron	37	3,041	7.3%	
Socialist	(incumbent)George Armstrong	35	2,064	4.7%	
Independent Labour	(incumbent)William Ivens (8)	37	3,648	8.7%	
Independent Labour	Seymour Farmer (7)	36	4,036	9.2%	
Progressive	Richard Craig(10)	37	3,412	8.2%	
Progressive	George Chipman	31	1,467	3.4%	
Conservative	Arthur Sullivan	32	1,530	3.5%	
Progressive	Thomas J. Murray	36	2,181	5.0%	
Workers	Mathew Popovitch	28	1,039	2.4%	
Liberal	W.H. Trueman	30	1,323	3.0%	
Progressive	Patrick J. Henry	23	723	1.6%	
Liberal	James McTavish	26	848	1.9%	
Liberal	William James Donovan	27	922	2.1%	
Conservative	(incumbent)William Johnston Tupper	24	754	1.7%	
Liberal	W.R. Milton	29	1,070	2.4%	
Liberal	Arni Eggertson	25	768	1.7%	
Conservative	Daniel McLean	20	612	1.4%	
Progressive	Charles K. Newcombe	21	654	1.5%	
Union Labour	James Winning	22	683	1.5%	
Progressive	Peter McCallum	18	521	1.2%	
Liberal	Hugh D. Cutler	17	489	1.1%	
Conservative	Mrs. L. Brown	16	449	1.0%	
Independent Labour	Sam Cartwright	19	557	1.3%	
Independent	B.B. Dubienski	14	364	<1%	
Progressive	Mrs. M.J. Hample	15	393	<1%	
Liberal	A.L. Maclean	12	275	<1%	
Workers	Arthur Henderson	13	282	<1%	
Independent	Fred Hilson	10	175	<1%	
Union Labour	F.W. McGill	9	165	<1%	
Independent	W.C. Morden	7	145	<1%	
Progressive	Arthur Puttee	8	150	<1%	
Independent Labour	James Simpkin	6	140	<1%	
Workers	William Hammond	5	112	<1%	
Conservative	Agnes Munro	4	100	<1%	
Independent Labour	Mrs. M. McCartney	3	96	<1%	
Independent	Colin McPhail	2	39	<1%	
Exhausted votes			2511	5.7%	

Order in which declared elected
Candidate	Rank
Fred Dixon	1
Robert Jacob	2
J.K. Downes	3
William Sanford Evans	4
John Thomas Haig	5
John Queen	6
Seymour Farmer	7
William Ivens	8
Edith Rogers	9
Richard Craig	10
Results in 1920
Fred Dixon	1
Thomas Herman Johnson	2
William Ivens	3
John Thomas Haig	4
John Queen	5
John Stovel	6
Duncan Cameron	7
George Armstrong	8
Edith Rogers	9
William Johnston Tupper	10

Note: Reports of vote tallies were incomplete for counts 32–36. Count 31 was used as the base for calculating applicable percentages above.

=== Deferred elections ===
Elections for several northern ridings were deferred to later dates:

Electoral district	Candidates					Incumbent
Electoral district	Progressive	Liberal	Conservative	Labour	Other	Incumbent
Ethelbert (August 26, 1922)	Nicholas A. Hryhorczuk acclaimed					Nicholas A. Hryhorczuk; Ind. Farmer
Rupertsland (September 13, 1922)	Francis Black acclaimed					John Morrison
The Pas (October 5, 1922)	John Bracken; 472				Herman Finger (Ind) 118; P.C. Robertson (Ind) 71; R.H. MacNeill (Ind) 38	Edward Brown

== Early by-elections ==
When Duncan Lloyd McLeod (Arthur), Neil Cameron (Minnedosa) and William Clubb (Morris) were appointed to cabinet on August 8, 1922, they were obliged to resign their seats and seek re-election. All were returned by acclamation on August 26, 1922.

== Post-election changes ==
Winnipeg (res. Fred Dixon, July 27, 1923)

Mountain (Charles Cannon appointed to cabinet, December 3, 1923), December 24, 1923:

- Charles Cannon (P) 1630
- George Fraser (C) 857

Carillon (Albert Prefontaine appointed to cabinet, December 3, 1923), December 24, 1923:

- Albert Prefontaine (P) 1177
- Maurice Dupez (Ind) 494

Assiniboia (William Bayley leaves the Labour Party on January 8, 1924)

Lansdowne (res. Tobias Norris, 1925), December 9, 1925:

- Tobias Norris (L) accl.

St. Boniface (res. Joseph Bernier, September 1, 1926)
