= George Johnson (Manitoba politician) =

Canadian politician

The Honourable George Johnson OC

20th Lieutenant Governor of Manitoba
- In office December 11, 1986 – March 5, 1993
- Monarch: Elizabeth II
- Governors-General: Jeanne Sauvé; Ray Hnatyshyn
- Premier: Howard Pawley; Gary Filmon
- Preceded by: Pearl McGonigal
- Succeeded by: Yvon Dumont

Manitoba Minister of Health^{1}
- In office September 24, 1968 – July 15, 1969
- Premier: Walter Weir
- Preceded by: Charles Witney
- Succeeded by: Sidney Green (as Minister of Health and Social Development)
- In office June 30, 1958 – December 9, 1963
- Premier: Dufferin Roblin
- Preceded by: Robert Bend
- Succeeded by: Charles Witney

Manitoba Minister of Education
- In office December 9, 1963 – September 24, 1968
- Premier: Dufferin Roblin; Walter Weir
- Preceded by: Stewart McLean
- Succeeded by: Donald Craik (as Minister of Youth and Education)

Member of the Legislative Assembly of Manitoba for Gimli
- In office June 16, 1958 – June 25, 1969
- Preceded by: Steinn O. Thompson
- Succeeded by: John Gottfried

Personal details
- Born: November 18, 1920 Winnipeg, Manitoba
- Died: June 8, 1995 (aged 74) Gimli, Manitoba
- Party: Progressive Conservative
- Spouse: Doris Blondal
- Education: University of Manitoba
- Profession: Physician

Military service
- Branch/service: Royal Canadian Navy
- Years of service: 1941–1945
- Rank: Captain
- ^{1} Minister of Health and Public Welfare from June 30, 1958, to October 25, 1961

George Johnson, OC (November 18, 1920 – July 8, 1995) was a medical doctor and is seen by historians as one of the leading political reformers of the twentieth century in Manitoba. He served as a Cabinet Minister in the governments of Dufferin Roblin and Walter Weir and as the province's 20th Lieutenant Governor from 1986 to 1993.

== Early life ==
Johnson was born in Winnipeg, to a family of Icelandic heritage. He received a B.Sc. and M.D. from the University of Manitoba and served as a Lieutenant (later, Captain) with the Royal Canadian Navy from 1941 to 1945.

== Political career ==
Johnson was first elected to the Manitoba legislature in 1958, for the riding of Gimli, north of Winnipeg. A Progressive Conservative, he was appointed Minister of Health and Public Welfare in the minority government of Dufferin Roblin, who had personally recruited him to run for the party. He retained the health portfolio when the Progressive Conservatives won a majority government in 1959, and oversaw a policy of major hospital expansions in the province and other significant reforms between 1959 and 1963.

On December 9, 1963, Johnson moved to the Ministry of Education as the government sought to cope with the educational requirements of a rapidly expanding baby-boom population. He held this position until September 24, 1968, and was responsible for, among other achievements, the establishment of the universities of Winnipeg and Brandon, respectively, and the Manitoba Institute of Technology (later 'Red River Community College'), and for introducing the policy of "shared services" for public and separate schools (allowing children in separate schools to access public programs for busing, textbooks and the like). In 1968, Johnson returned to his old portfolio as Minister of Health, to oversee an historic change in the provision of medical services: the implementation of medicare in Manitoba.

Ideologically, Johnson was a progressive, often referred to as (somewhat erroneously) a Red Tory with beliefs similar to those held by Premier Roblin. Along with Roblin, he is considered by historians to be the leading political reformer of his generation and among the most influential cabinet ministers in Manitoba history. Although generally a free marketeer, Johnson supported government intervention in the economy in certain areas, for example, in such areas as public utility management, education, major infrastructure projects and certain medical services. When Roblin shifted to federal politics in 1967, Johnson was the only candidate from the Progressive Conservative Party's progressive wing to seek its leadership. A late entry into the leadership race hurt his campaign and while he was the alternative choice for leader among many delegates, the fact that Johnson did not survive to the later balloting prevented him from emerging as the possible compromise choice for party leader among delegates.

=== Break from politics ===
Johnson did not seek re-election in 1969, and returned to medical practice in Winnipeg. An experienced physician, within a few years he had one of the largest medical practices in Manitoba.

=== Lieutenant governorship ===
Leaving medicine again for the public arena in 1978, Johnson served for the subsequent eight years as a special consultant to the Manitoba government, providing strategic advice and counsel to the government in various areas of health policy. On December 11, 1986, in "recognition of his services to the people of Manitoba", he was appointed as the province's lieutenant governor by Governor General Jeanne Sauvé, on the advice of Prime Minister Brian Mulroney. He served in this position until March 5, 1993.

== Honours ==
In his career, the governments of Canada and Iceland conferred on Johnson the highest civilian honours that can be bestowed on their respective citizens: the Order of Canada in 1994, and the Icelandic Order of the Falcon in 1992. He was also awarded honorary Doctor of Laws degrees from three universities: Manitoba, Winnipeg and Royal Roads (1992–95).

George Johnson Middle School in Gimli was named in his honour.

== Death ==
Johnson died in 1995 in Gimli. His wife, the former Doris Blondal, died the following year. They had six children and ten grandchildren. Their daughter Janis was a Manitoba senator for twenty six years.

== Arms ==
Coat of arms of George Johnson

Adopted
December 16, 1991
Crest
Issuant from a coronet érablé Argent a falcon Azure wings addorsed Argent and Gules wearing a coronet of crosses patté Argent bearing in its dexter talon six ears of wheat leaved Or
Escutcheon
Azure an Icelandic falcon (Falco rusticolus islandicus) displayed Argent gorged with a leather thong pendant therefrom a winged heart Gules bearing in its dexter talon a rod of Aesculapius Or and in its sinister talon a bishop's crozier also Or
Supporters
Dexter a horse Argent crined, langued, queued and unguled Gules gorged with a collar Azure pendant therefrom a hurt charged with an artist's palette Or and paintbrush Gules Sinister a buffalo Argent langued, horned and unguled Gules gorged with a collar Azure pendant therefrom a hurt charged with an anchor Or
Compartment
A grassy mound scattered with Prairie crocus flowers proper
Motto
NEVER UNPREPARED
