= Taras Ferley =

Canadian politician

Taras Demeter Ferley (October 14, 1882—July 27, 1947) was a publisher and politician in Manitoba, Canada. He served in the Legislative Assembly of Manitoba from 1915 to 1920 as a supporter of the Liberal Party, the first Ukrainian Canadian to be elected to Manitoba's legislature.

Ferley was born in Austro-Hungarian-controlled Ukraine, and educated at the Kolomyja Gymnasium and Lemberg University. In Ukraine, he was a member of the Radical Party. He moved to San Francisco, California, US in 1903, and took part in a communal living experiment which ended in failure after a few months. He arrived in Canada in 1905 and worked as a publisher and real estate broker. He became the director of the Ukrainian Publishing Company of Canada, and taught at the Ruthenian Training School at Brandon from 1907 to 1910.

He first ran for the Manitoba legislature in the 1914 provincial election, contesting the constituency of Gimli as an Independent-Liberal. He lost, finishing third against Conservative Sveinn Thorvaldson and official Liberal candidate Einar Jonasson.

Ferley ran again as an Independent-Liberal in the 1915 provincial election, and became the constituency's de facto Liberal candidate after Jonasson withdrew from the race. Ferley defeated Thorvaldson by 610 votes, and supported Tobias Norris's Liberal administration for the next five years. In his parliamentary biography, Ferley emphasized his loyalty to Canada and to the British Empire Canada was part of.

As the sole Ukrainian member of the legislature, Ferley protested against the federal government's treatment of Ukrainian-Canadians during World War I. Unlike others in the Liberal Party, he defended Manitoba's bilingual education system of state funding for Anglophone and Francophone schools.

He was defeated in the 1920 provincial election, losing to United Farmers candidate Gudmundur Fjelsted by 117 votes.
