= Michael Rojeski =

Canadian politician

Michael Rojeski (1884—October 26, 1965) was a politician in Manitoba, Canada. He served in the Legislative Assembly of Manitoba from 1922 to 1927, as a member of the Manitoba Liberal Party.

He was elected to the Manitoba legislature in the 1922 provincial election, defeating United Farmers of Manitoba (UFM) candidate Ingimar Ingaldson by 260 votes in Gimli. The UFM formed government after the election, and Rojeski served as an opposition member for the next five years.

Rojeski lost the Liberal nomination to Einar Jonasson in the 1927 election and campaigned as an independent candidate. He finished third, behind both Ingaldson and Jonasson.
