= John Kennedy (Manitoba politician) =

Canadian politician

John Kennedy (August 16, 1867 – October 1, 1927) was a politician in Manitoba, Canada. He served in the Legislative Assembly of Manitoba from 1920 to 1927, as a member of the Conservative Party.

He was born in Martintown, Ontario, the son of John Kennedy and Mary Kennedy (her maiden name), both of Scottish descent. Kennedy came west in 1882, first working at an iron works in Winnipeg and then later building bridges through the Rocky Mountains for the Canadian Pacific Railway. He then entered the hotel business in Morden, Manitoba and also farmed.

He was first elected to the Manitoba legislature in the 1920 provincial election, defeating Liberal candidate Howard Winkler by sixty-two votes in the southern Manitoba constituency of Morden and Rhineland. The Conservatives won only eight seats out of fifty-five in this campaign, and Kennedy served on the opposition benches for the next two years.

He was re-elected in the 1922 election, defeating United Farmers of Manitoba candidate John Sweet by 337 votes. The Conservatives fell to seven seats provincially, and Kennedy remained an opposition member. He did not seek re-election in 1927.

Kennedy died in Vancouver, British Columbia in 1927.
