= George Little (Manitoba politician) =

Canadian politician

George Little (January 20, 1858 – March 10, 1940) was a politician in Manitoba, Canada. He served in the Legislative Assembly of Manitoba from 1920 to 1927.

Little worked as a farmer in Neepawa, Manitoba. He was first elected to the Manitoba legislature in the provincial election of 1920, winning by acclamation as a Farmer candidate in the constituency of Beautiful Plains.

He ran for re-election in the 1922 provincial election as a candidate of the United Farmers of Manitoba (UFM), and won an easy victory over candidates of the Liberal and Conservative parties. The UFM unexpectedly formed government following the election, and Little served as a backbench supporter of John Bracken's administration for the next five years. He did not seek re-election in 1927.
