= John Bucklaschuk =

Canadian politician

Member of the Legislative Assembly of Manitoba for Gimli
- In office November 17, 1981 – April 26, 1988
- Preceded by: Keith Cosens
- Succeeded by: Ed Helwer

Personal details
- Born: July 18, 1939 (age 87) Rossburn, Manitoba, Canada
- Party: New Democratic Party of Manitoba
- Spouse: Colleen Hagen (m. 1968)
- Education: Brandon University, University of Manitoba
- Profession: educator

John M. Bucklaschuk (born July 18, 1939) is a politician in Manitoba, Canada.

He was a member of the Legislative Assembly of Manitoba from 1981 to 1988, and a cabinet minister in the New Democratic Party government of Howard Pawley from 1982 to 1988.

Bucklaschuk was born in Rossburn, Manitoba. The son of Michael Bucklaschuk and Agnes Woycheshin, he was educated at Brandon University and the University of Manitoba, and worked as an educator before entering political life.

Bucklaschuk married Colleen Christina Hagen in 1968.

In the Canadian federal election of 1972, he ran as a New Democratic Party candidate in the riding of Lisgar, but finished a distant third against incumbent Progressive Conservative Jack Murta, and former Lieutenant-Governor and Liberal candidate Richard Spink Bowles.

Bucklaschuk first ran for the Manitoba legislature in the provincial election of 1973, losing to Progressive Conservative Earl McKellar in the rural, southeastern riding of Souris-Killarney. This seat is generally regarded as a Tory seat.

Bucklaschuk was elected for the mid-northern riding of Gimli in the 1981 provincial election, defeating incumbent Tory Keith Cosens by 830 votes.

He entered cabinet on August 20, 1982, being named Minister of Consumer and Corporate Affairs and Minister of Cooperative Development, with responsibility for the Manitoba Public Insurance Corporation Act.

Following a cabinet shuffle on November 4, 1983, he was named Minister of Housing, while retaining the MPICA responsibility.

In the 1986 election, he was re-elected over Tory candidate Ed Helwer by almost 1,000 votes. On April 17, 1986, he was named Minister of Municipal Affairs.

Following another cabinet shuffle on September 21, 1987, he was named Minister of Highways and was relieved of his responsibility for the MPICA.

The NDP unexpectedly lost a legislative vote of confidence in early 1988, and Bucklaschuk lost his seat to Helwer by over 1,000 votes in the election which followed.

He has not sought a return to the legislature since this time. He worked in real estate after his loss, and was elected to the Gimli municipal council in 1990.

Recently, Bucklaschuk has spoken out against the proposed North American Missile Defense Shield promoted by the American administration of George W. Bush.

== Electoral Record ==
1972 Canadian federal election: Lisgar
Party	Candidate	Votes
Progressive Conservative	Jack Murta	17,253
Liberal	Richard Spink Bowles	4,469
New Democratic	John Bucklaschuk	1,627
Social Credit	John L. Harms	943
