= Albert McGregor =

Canadian politician

Albert Daniel McGregor (July 14, 1870 – 1948) was a politician in Manitoba, Canada. He served in the Legislative Assembly of Manitoba from 1922 to 1927.

McGregor ran for the House of Commons of Canada in the 1917 federal election as a candidate of the opposition Laurier Liberals. He lost to government candidate Fred Langdon Davis by 3,056 votes.

He was elected for the constituency of Gladstone in the 1922 provincial election, as a candidate of the United Farmers of Manitoba (UFM). The UFM won the election, and formed government as Progressive Party of Manitoba. For the next five years, McGregor served as a backbench supporter of John Bracken's ministry. He did not run for re-election in 1927.
