= Edith Rogers (Manitoba politician) =

Canadian politician

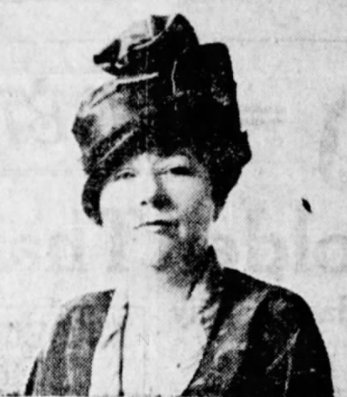
- Rogers in 1925

Member of the Manitoba Legislative Assembly for Winnipeg
- In office 1920–1932

Personal details
- Born: Edith Florence McTavish; April 26, 1876 Norway House, Manitoba
- Died: April 19, 1947 (aged 70) Colborne, Ontario, Canada
- Party: Manitoba Liberal Party
- Spouse: Robert Arthur Rogers (m. 1898)
- Children: Margaret Konantz

Edith Florence Rogers (née McTavish; April 26, 1876 — April 19, 1947) was a Métis politician in Manitoba, Canada. She served in the Legislative Assembly of Manitoba from 1920 to 1932, as a member of the Manitoba Liberal Party. She was the first woman ever elected to the legislature.

== Early life and family ==
Edith Florence McTavish was born at Norway House, Manitoba on April 26, 1876, the daughter of Métis parents Lydia Catherine Christie and Donald C. McTavish, Chief Factor of the Hudson's Bay Company. Edith's mother Lydia was the daughter of William Christie (HBC chief factor at Edmonton) and Mary Sinclair. Rogers had strong family connections to Manitoba's past. Her maternal great-grandfather, Alexander Christie, served as Governor of Assiniboia on two occasions, and supervised the construction of Fort Garry. His son, William J. Christie, worked for the Hudson's Bay Company in Manitoba from 1843 to 1873, and was named Inspecting Chief Factor in 1868. Rogers herself was born in the tiny outpost of Norway House, six hundred kilometres north of Winnipeg, the daughter of Donald MacTavish, a chief factor for the Hudson's Bay Company. At age two, she moved with her family to Rupert House, on the shore of James Bay.

== Marriage, philanthropy, charitable work ==
She was educated in Montreal. After graduation, she moved to Winnipeg and, in 1898, married the businessman Robert Arthur Rogers. She became prominent as a philanthropist in the 1910s, and particularly after the outbreak of World War I in 1914. Rogers worked for the Patriotic Fund, which distributed money to the families of soldiers fighting overseas, and became known for devoting several hours to personal consultations with family members. She also worked with the Salvation Army, the Red Cross, the Land Settlement Board and other groups.

== Political career ==
In 1916, Manitoba's Liberal government of Tobias Norris passed a law extending voting rights to women. In 1920, Rogers was asked to become a "star candidate" for the Liberal Party in the Winnipeg constituency, which elected ten members by a single transferable ballot. She accepted, contested the 1920 provincial election, finished eighth on the first count, and was declared elected on the thirty-eighth count.

For the next two years, Rogers served as a backbench supporter of Norris's administration. Because of her work with Winnipeg's returned soldiers and unemployed men, she was more sympathetic to labour issues than were most others in the Liberal caucus. She played a significant role in steering Manitoba's Child Welfare Act through committee and into law. She also supported the prohibition of alcohol.

However her election did not signal renewed political power for Manitoba's Metis or for women.

The Liberals were defeated by the United Farmers of Manitoba in the 1922 provincial election. Rogers, who was re-elected in Winnipeg, served with seven other Liberals on the opposition benches. She frequently criticised social service cuts enacted by John Bracken's administration.

Rogers was re-elected for a final time in the 1927 election, which the Liberals again lost. In 1928, she represented Canada at the Geneva Conference for the abolition of import and export prohibitions and restrictions. Her husband died in 1929, and she did not seek re-election in 1932.

== Later life and death ==
She resumed her philanthropic career in World War II, serving as chair of the Provincial War Council of the Red Cross. She retired in 1942, and died in Colborne, Ontario five years later on April 21, 1947.

== Margaret Konantz ==
Rogers's daughter, Margaret Konantz, served as a Liberal member of the House of Commons of Canada from 1963 to 1965, and was the first woman ever elected as a federal MP from Manitoba.

== Publications ==
Gail Konantz wrote a biography of Rogers in 1981.
