= Duncan Stuart McLeod =

Canadian politician

Duncan Stuart McLeod (December 17, 1854–July 31, 1933) was a politician in Manitoba, Canada. He served in the Legislative Assembly of Manitoba from 1922 to 1927.

McLeod was born in Tamworth, Canada West. He worked as a farmer in Goodlands, Manitoba, and also served as a reeve and magistrate. His grandfather and father were soldiers in the British army, and two of McLeod's sons served with the C.E.F.

He was elected to the Manitoba legislature in the 1922 provincial election as a candidate of the United Farmers of Manitoba, defeating Conservative William Chalmers and Liberal incumbent Robert Thornton.

The UFM unexpectedly formed government after this election, and McLeod served as a backbench supporter of John Bracken's administration for the next five years. He did not seek re-election in 1927.

McLeod died on July 31, 1933, in Brenda, Manitoba.
