= William Brown (Manitoba politician) =

Canadian politician

William Brown (21 February 1870 - 9 November 1943) was a politician in Manitoba, Canada. He served in the Legislative Assembly of Manitoba from 1922 to 1927.

Brown lived in Roland, Manitoba. He was elected to the Manitoba legislature in the 1922 provincial election as a candidate of the United Farmers of Manitoba (UFM), defeating independent candidate Herbert Robinson by 141 votes in the constituency of Dufferin.

The UFM unexpectedly formed government after this election, and Brown served as a backbench supporter of John Bracken's administration for the next five years. He did not seek re-election in 1927.

William Brown died at Carman on 9 November 1943 and was buried in the Carman Cemetery.

== Family ==
Brown's wife was Jennie Luella Bruce, whom he married on January 6, 1904, in Winnipeg. Their son was Ralph Churchill Brown (1905–1981).
