= Ed Helwer =

Canadian politician

Member of the Legislative Assembly of Manitoba for Gimli
- In office 26 April 1988 – 3 June 2003
- Preceded by: John Bucklaschuk
- Succeeded by: Peter Bjornson

Personal details
- Born: Edward Russell Helwer; 20 December 1940 (age 85)
- Party: Progressive Conservative

Edward Russell Helwer (born 20 December 1940) is a politician in Manitoba, Canada. He served as a Progressive Conservative member of the Manitoba legislature from 1988 to 2003. Although the Manitoba Progressive Conservative Party was in power for most of this period, Helwer was never appointed to a cabinet position (though he did serve as Party Whip at one point).

== Biography ==
Helwer was born in Selkirk, Manitoba. He worked as an Esso agent from 1963 to 1974, and was a Macleod Authorized Dealer from 1974 to 1983. From 1976 to 1996, he was also the owner of a small business called Rockwood Farm Supplies. Helwer served as a municipal councillor in Teulon from 1969 to 1973 and 1977 to 1980, and was the town's Mayor from 1980 to 1988. He was also chair of the Hunter Hospital Board from 1977 to 1987.

Helwer first ran for the Manitoba legislature in the 1986 provincial election, losing to New Democratic Party incumbent John Bucklaschuk by about 950 votes in the riding of Gimli. In the 1988 election (called after the NDP government lost a budget vote and held during a period of unpopularity for the party), Helwer defeated Bucklaschuk by about 1400 votes to win the riding.

Helwer was re-elected easily in the 1990 election, and was able to defeat NDP challenger Fran Frederickson by about 1800 votes in 1995. He faced Frederickson again in the 1999 election, and saw his majority cut to only 402 votes; the NDP were victorious in the province, and Helwer became Progressive Conservative critic for Government Services and Emergency Management in the opposition.

Helwer did not seek re-election in 2003, and the Gimli riding was subsequently won by the New Democratic Party again.

Helwer was awarded the Queen Elizabeth II Golden Jubilee Medal in 2002.
