= Steinn O. Thompson =

Canadian politician

Steinn Olafur Thompson (November 23, 1893 – August 19, 1972) was a politician in Manitoba, Canada. He served in the Legislative Assembly of Manitoba as a Liberal-Progressive from 1945 to 1958.

Thompson was born in Winnipeg and grew up in Selkirk. He was educated at Wesley College and the Manitoba Medical College. He practised as a doctor in Riverton, Manitoba after serving overseas with the Canadian Army in World War I.

Thompson was first elected to the Manitoba legislature in the 1945 provincial election, defeating CCF candidate S.S. Johnson by 696 votes in the constituency of Gimli. He was returned by acclamation in the 1949 election, and was easily re-elected in the 1953 election. Thompson was a backbench supporter of Douglas Campbell's government during his time in the legislature. He was generally regarded as an undogmatic politician.

The Liberal-Progressives were defeated in the 1958 election, and Thompson lost his seat to George Johnson of the Progressive Conservative Party by 614 votes.

Thompson was of Icelandic background. After leaving politics, he wrote a work of local history entitled "Riverton and the Icelandic River Settlement". The work is over 400 pages long, and is available online.

He died at home in Riverton at the age of 78.

Thompson's eulogy was delivered by Philip Petursson, a Unitarian minister who served in the Manitoba assembly as a New Democrat.
