= Francis Black (politician) =

Canadian politician (1870–1941)

Francis Mollison Black
- Born: July 17, 1870; Kilmarnock, Scotland
- Died: February 19, 1941 (aged 70); Vancouver
- Occupation: politician

Francis Mollison Black (July 17, 1870 – February 19, 1941) was a politician in Manitoba, Canada. He served in the Legislative Assembly of Manitoba from 1922 to 1927, and was a cabinet minister in John Bracken's government from 1922 to 1925.

Black was born in Kilmarnock, Scotland, the son of Francis M. Black, and was educated at Perth Academy and at King's College London. He joined the British civil service in 1886 and then was hired by the Union Discount Company of London in 1889. In 1892, he moved to British Columbia, where he worked for the Bank of British Columbia. Black operated on his own in Vancouver from 1898 to 1901. In 1895, he married Margaret Elizabeth McIntosh. He later joined the Pat Burns Company, working in Nelson and Calgary. Black served as president of the Calgary Board of Trade in 1916-17 and was a member of the Alberta Public Utilities Commission in 1917. He later moved to Manitoba, and became treasurer of the United Grain Growers association. Black became vice-president of the Winnipeg Street Railway Company in 1924.

Black's entry into politics came about in an unusual manner, after the United Farmers of Manitoba (UFM) emerged as the province's largest political party in the 1922 provincial election. The UFM won 25 seats out of 52, with elections deferred in three other northern seats. They were not an organized political party, however, and did not have a leader until John Bracken was chosen by caucus after the election.

The UFM, which governed as the Progressive Party, promoted the philosophy that Manitoba should be governed in an efficient, businesslike and non-partisan manner. Although Black had no political experience, and was not a candidate in the 1922 election, his successful management of the United Grain Growers recommended him to the new administration. He was chosen as Bracken's Provincial Treasurer and Minister of Telephones and Telegrams on August 8, 1922. On September 13, he was declared elected by acclamation for the sprawling northern constituency of Rupertsland, one of the province's deferred seats.

The historian John Kendle has described Black as "a dry, dour Scotsman renowned for his frugality and efficiency". He proved equally cautious and frugal as a finance minister, and played little role in parliamentary debates.

Black resigned his ministerial portfolios on January 12, 1925, and served as a government backbencher for the next two years. He did not seek re-election in 1927.

In 1927, Black became chair of the British Columbia fruit control board.

He died in Vancouver at the age of 70.
