= John K. Downes =

Canadian politician

John Kensington Downes (1879 – January 28, 1944) was a politician in Manitoba, Canada. He served in the Legislative Assembly of Manitoba from 1922 to 1927, as an independent member.

Born in Platt Bridge, Lancashire, England, he was educated at St. Mark's College in London. Downes taught English and history at Diocesan College in Pretoria, South Africa, later returning to England and teaching in Suffolk and Somersetshire. In 1912, he moved to Winnipeg. Downes served with the 184th Battalion and later as an officer with the 11th Canadian Railway Corps during World War I. After the war, he worked for the Soldiers Settlement Board.

Downes's election to the Manitoba legislature occurred during a period of provincial controversy over the prohibition of alcohol. Although Downes was listed on the ballot as an independent candidate, he campaigned as a representative of the province's "Moderation League", supporting restrictions on the sale of alcoholic beverages. He called for beer to be sold only "by the glass" in licensed establishments for on-premises consumption, and opposed efforts to permit sales "by the bottle" for home consumption. It is not clear what views Downes held on other political issues.

He was elected to the Manitoba legislature in the 1922 provincial election for the constituency of Winnipeg, which elected ten members by a single transferable ballot. Downes finished third on the first ballot, and was declared elected on the eleventh count. After serving as an opposition member for the next five years, Downes again ran as a "Moderation League" candidate in the 1927 provincial election. He narrowly missed re-election, finishing in eleventh place on the final count.

After leaving politics, he worked for the Provincial Liquor Control Commission until his retirement in 1939.

Downes sought a return to the legislature in the 1941 provincial election, running as an independent opposing the province's coalition government. He was a marginal political force by this time, and finished next-to-last in a field of twenty-seven candidates.

He died at Deer Lodge hospital in Winnipeg after a short illness.
