= Sigtryggur Jonasson =

Canadian politician

Member of the Legislative Assembly of Manitoba for St. Andrews
- In office 1896–1899

Member of the Legislative Assembly of Manitoba for Gimli
- In office 1907–1910
- Preceded by: Baldwin Baldwinson
- Succeeded by: Baldwin Baldwinson

Personal details
- Born: February 8, 1852 Iceland
- Died: November 26, 1942 (aged 90)
- Party: Liberal

Sigtryggur Jonasson (February 8, 1852 – November 26, 1942) was a community leader and politician in Manitoba, Canada. He played a major part in establishing the Icelandic community in Manitoba. Jonasson served in the Legislative Assembly of Manitoba from 1896 to 1899 and again from 1907 to 1910, as a member of the Manitoba Liberal Party.

Jonasson was born to a farm family at Bakki in Öxnadalur, Iceland, and was home-educated. He moved to Canada in 1872, and soon entered a profitable business partnership in Ontario. Appointed an immigration agent by the Ontario government in 1874, he succeeded in redirecting the flow of Icelandic immigration to Canada, most of his countrymen having previously gone to the United States. In 1875, he helped select an Icelandic reserve called New Iceland in Keewatin District, Northwest Territory, including the area around present-day Gimli. Jonasson was also instrumental in the founding of Framfari (Progress) in 1877, the first Icelandic-language newspaper on the North American continent.

During a major exodus from New Iceland in 1879–1881, Jonasson established a sawmill and transportation company at Icelandic River (Riverton)in partnership with Fridjon Fridriksson, thus providing employment and stabilizing the settlement. In 1881 New Iceland was incorporated into Manitoba and in 1887 residents adopted municipal government. Though he moved to Selkirk and later to Winnipeg to manage his business interests, Jonasson remained a strong supporter of the settlement, for which reason he became known as the 'Father of New Iceland'. He was also instrumental in finally convincing CPR officials to extend the railway to Gimli in 1906, Arborg in 1910, and Riverton in 1914, and is thus responsible for the development of these thriving communities through the following decades. He was, along with Einar Hjörleifsson Kvaran a key founder of the Icelandic newspaper Lögberg (Tribune), still published in Winnipeg in 2009, Jonasson also acted as the paper's editor from 1895 to 1901.

He first campaigned for the Manitoba Legislature in the 1896 provincial election, and defeated his cousin, Conservative Party candidate Baldwin Baldwinson, by 79 votes in the St. Andrews constituency. The Liberal Party won this election under Thomas Greenway's leadership, and Jonasson served as a government backbencher for the next three years.

Following redistribution, Jonasson campaigned in the 1899 election for the new constituency of Gimli, and lost to Baldwinson by eight votes. The Gimli election was deferred for a week after the rest of the province had voted, and a provincial Conservative majority had already been announced.

The federal government of Wilfrid Laurier appointed Jonasson a Homestead Inspector for the Interlake District in 1901. He retained the post until 1906. He was then returned to the provincial assembly in the 1907 election, defeating Baldwinson by 156 votes. The Conservatives won this election, and Jonasson served for the next three years as an opposition member. He did not seek re-election in 1910.

Jonasson helped to establish a co-operative agricultural marketing scheme for Icelandic farmers in 1907, and became the co-owner of a slaughterhouse in Winnipeg. The venture failed, and Jonasson was widely criticized in the Icelandic community for his role. He does not appear to have been wealthy in his later years.

In 1930, Jonasson represented Canada at the millennium anniversary of Iceland's parliament. The government of Manitoba established a commemorative plaque in his honour in 1983.
