= William J. Short =

Canadian politician

William John Short (September 22, 1865

– September 7, 1939) was a politician in Manitoba, Canada. He served in the Legislative Assembly of Manitoba from 1922 to 1927.

He was born in Wellington County, Canada West, the son of William J. Short and Margaret Oakmen, and was educated in Grey County. After leaving school at sixteen, Short worked as a farm labourer until 1888, when he travelled west to Manitoba, settling on a homestead near Shoal Lake, Manitoba. In 1885, he married Matilda Bumpstead. He operated a butcher shop for five years and then became a livestock dealer. Short subsequently purchased a farm, where he grew grain and raised cattle and horses. He served on the council for the Rural Municipality of Shoal Lake and was reeve from 1907 to 1922.

He ran for the Manitoba legislature in the 1922 provincial election as a candidate of the United Farmers of Manitoba (UFM), and defeated Liberal candidate William Iverach by 597 votes in the Birtle constituency.

The UFM unexpectedly formed government following the election. Short served as a backbench supporter of John Bracken's administration for the next five years. He did not run for re-election in 1927.

Short died in Shoal Lake.
