= Baldwin Baldwinson =

Canadian politician

Baldwin Larus Baldwinson (October 26, 1856 – October 5, 1936) was a politician in Manitoba, Canada. He served in the Legislative Assembly of Manitoba from 1899 to 1907 and from 1910 to 1913, as a member of the Conservative Party.

Baldwinson was born in Akureyri, Iceland, and attended public school in that country. He came to Canada in 1873, and worked in the newspaper industry. He was editor of the Icelandic Weekly Heimskringla, and served as president, secretary and manager of the Heimskringla News and Publishing Co., Ltd. He was a member of the Lutheran church.

He first ran for the Manitoba legislature in the 1892 provincial election, and lost to Liberal Frederick Colcleugh by seventy-eight votes in the St. Andrews constituency. He ran again in the 1896 election, and lost to Liberal Sigtryggur Jonasson by seventy-nine votes.

He was elected to the legislature on his third attempt, defeating Jonasson by eight votes in the 1899 election, for the deferred Gimli constituency. The Conservatives won the election, and Baldwinson served in the legislature as a backbench supporter of the administrations led by Hugh John Macdonald and Rodmond Roblin. He was re-elected by acclamation in the 1903 election.

Baldwinson lost to Jonasson by 156 votes in the 1907 election. Jonasson did not seek re-election in the 1910 campaign, and Baldwin returned to the legislature after defeating a new Liberal candidate by 450 votes. He resigned his seat in 1913, on being appointed as deputy Provincial Secretary.
