= Brant-Argyle School =

Coordinates: 50.182425°N 97.452762°W

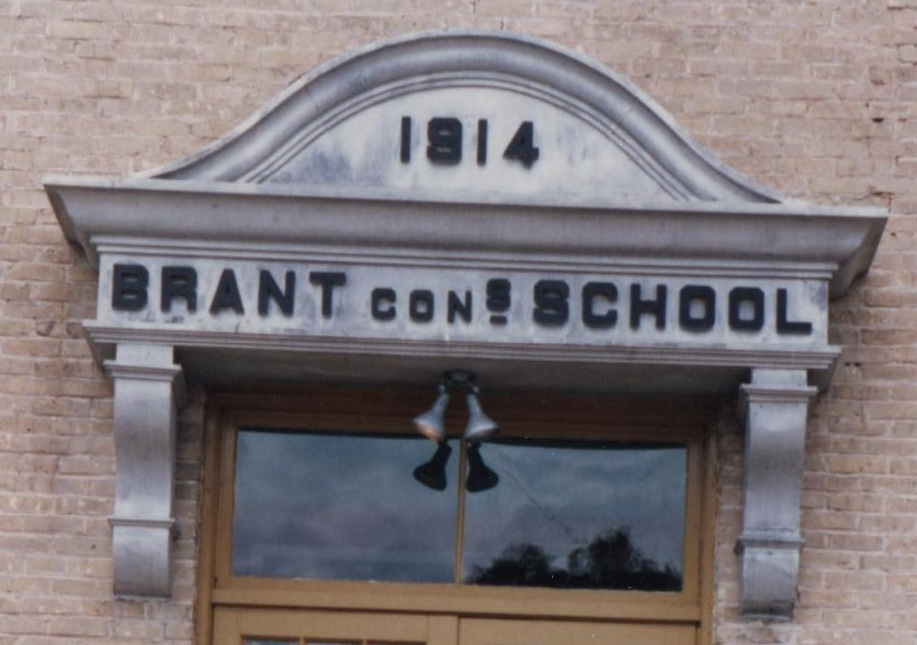
- Built in 1914
- Argyle, Manitoba; Canada

Information
- Type: Educational facility
- Established: 1914
- School district: Centre

The Brant-Argyle School (formerly Brant Consolidated School #1703) is an educational facility located in the village of Argyle, Manitoba, Canada. It was built in 1914 to consolidate the one-room schools in the Brant (1914), McLeod School (1914), Bruce (1914), Argyle (1963), Grassmere, Meridian (1959) and Centre School Districts.

== History ==
When the small one-room schools in Manitoba were reaching a point of growth in the early 1900s, there became a Consolidated School Movement to group them together. Larger schools mean that more courses could be offered, and money was saved by combining the efforts of the many schools scattered across the province.

In 1913, the trustees of the Brant and McLeod School Districts began to meet regarding the possible consolidation of their two schools. It was decided that they would build a new structure at the newly established village of Argyle Station, as it was halfway between the two existing schools. A committee was drawn up to decide costs and to place tenders in the local newspapers for construction of a brick veneer, two-storey building. This new structure would have two large classrooms, cloak rooms, a staircase, Trustee's room, principals office, and basement furnace room.

=== Other structures ===
The school property also was home to a horse barn with storage for the winter and summer school vans, an outdoor bathroom (with one side for girls, the other for boys) and a water pump house. The entire school yard was fenced with two entrance gates allowing for a "U-Shaped" dive way for the horse drawn vans. A flag pole was installed directly in front of the school.

=== Architectural Details ===
The school was originally built with just two classrooms, with a tower (containing the staircase, trustees room and principals office). At the time of construction the school appeared asymmetrical, with the tower off to the east side of the classroom component of the school. This was done on purpose, so that a future addition would need only classroom facilities, the tower would become centralized to serve both halves of the school.

The high ceilings and numerous windows (four on west side of classroom, three on south side of cloakroom) provide abundant natural light. The ceilings are decorative tin, floors are oak and interior walls are lath and plaster. The tower contains an oak staircase, with hand turned balusters. It is suspected that the brick came from the Balmoral Brick Company, located in nearby Balmoral, Manitoba.

The exterior of the building is brick veneer, built on a wood frame. The original roof was wood shingle material, with a brick chimney extending up and over the hip style roof line. Shallow brick arches give the windows a slightly round top, local field stone and mortar are used in the foundation and basement. On the tower, over the school's main entrance is a corrugated tin canopy sign reading: "Brant Cons School 1914"

=== Expansion ===
In the Mid 1920s it became clear that the Brant Consolidated School would need to be expanded as the numbers of students in the area were growing. Plans were made to add two more rooms to the school on the east side of the tower. A regular classroom would be upstairs and the main floor classroom would also double as a community room. It was in this room that concerts were held for Christmas, the community would gather for Fowl Suppers in the Fall, Remembrance Day services were held as well as dances, card parties and social events. A three-foot high stage was constructed in this room on the south wall, with two sets of stairs to gain access to the stage. A piano could be found on this stage as well. This was the only room in the building not to have a cloakroom on the south wall. In the north end of this multi purpose room were three doors, one leading outside to the back of the school and the other two were access to the tower component of the building. In the basement of this new half of the school, was a large room for the meals and dances that were held in the school. The kitchen was in the original half side basement and was used for many community functions.

==== Gymnasium ====
In the 1970s, the school now required an indoor gymnasium. It was decided that this metal structure would be built on the back of the school, with an adjoining breeze way. The Gym contains a large display case and small kitchen in the entrance area, two change rooms with bathrooms, an equipment room and a furnace room.

=== The School Today ===
In 1959, the local school board for Brant Consolidated 1703 was assumed by the newly formed Interlake School Division. In the 1980s the school was renamed Brant-Argyle School and has been administered by the ISD to present day.

=== Historic Designation ===
In the late 1990s a committee of community members from the Argyle area began to seek historic designation for the school. In 2003, the Manitoba Government, through Historic Resources Branch designated the school as a Manitoba Provincial Heritage Site. With this new designation, the school's exterior and some interior elements (including the staircase and tower) may not be altered through renovations. This move was important in protecting our local heritage.
