= Sveinn Thorvaldson =

Canadian politician (1872–1949)

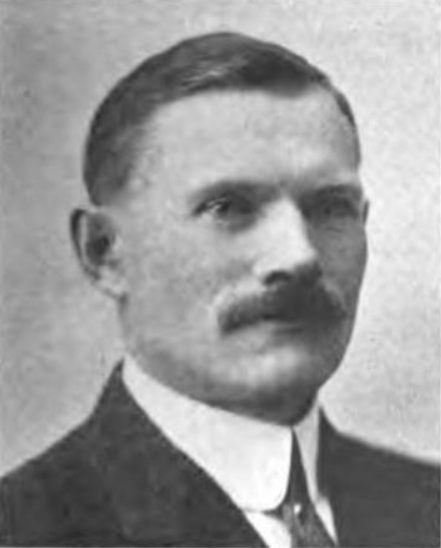

Member of the Legislative Assembly of Manitoba
- In office 1914–1915
- Constituency: Gimli

Personal details
- Born: March 3, 1872 Iceland
- Died: July 14, 1949 (aged 77) Winnipeg, Manitoba
- Party: Conservative
- Spouse: Margerate Solmunson (m. 1896)
- Children: 12, including Gunnar S. Thorvaldson
- Occupation: Businessman, politician

Sveinn Thorvaldson (March 3, 1872 – July 14, 1949) was a politician in Manitoba, Canada. He served in the Legislative Assembly of Manitoba from 1914 to 1915, as a member of the Conservative Party.

== Biography ==
Thorvaldson was born in Iceland, and came to Canada in 1887. He was educated at public schools, and at the Collegiate Institute of Winnipeg. He married Margerate Solmunson on April 13, 1896, and they had twelve children.

He worked as a merchant and was secretary-treasurer of Sigurdson and Thorvaldson Company Ltd. Thorvaldson served as reeve for the Rural Municipality of Gimli from 1903 to 1905 and for the Rural Municipality of Bifrost from 1908 to 1914, from 1922 to 1926 and from 1929 to 1930. In religion, he was a Unitarian.

He was elected to the Manitoba legislature in the 1914 provincial election, defeating Liberal candidate Einar Jonasson and Independent-Liberal Taras Ferley in the constituency of Gimli. The Conservatives won a majority government, and Thorvaldson served as a backbench supporter of Rodmond Roblin's government.

In 1915, the Roblin administration was forced to resign from office amid a serious corruption scandal. A new election was called, which the Liberal Party won in a landslide. Thorvaldson lost the Gimli constituency to Ferley by 610 votes.

In 1934, he became a member of the civil list of the Order of the British Empire and, in 1939, a member of the Icelandic Order of the Falcon.

He died in Winnipeg in 1949.

Thorvaldson's son, Gunnar S. Thorvaldson, also served in the assembly from 1941 to 1949.
