= Gudmundur Fjelsted =

Canadian politician

Gudmundur Fjelsted (1 November 1872—20 January 1961) was a politician in Manitoba, Canada. He served in the Legislative Assembly of Manitoba from 1920 to 1922.

Fjelsted was a farmer in Gimli, Manitoba. In the 1920 provincial election, he was elected to the legislature as a Farmer candidate, defeating Liberal incumbent Taras Ferley by 117 votes in the Gimli constituency. He served for the next two years as an opposition member, sitting with the Independent-Farmer group in the legislature.

He did not seek re-election in 1922.
