= Underwood, Markham =

Underwood
- Unincorporated community
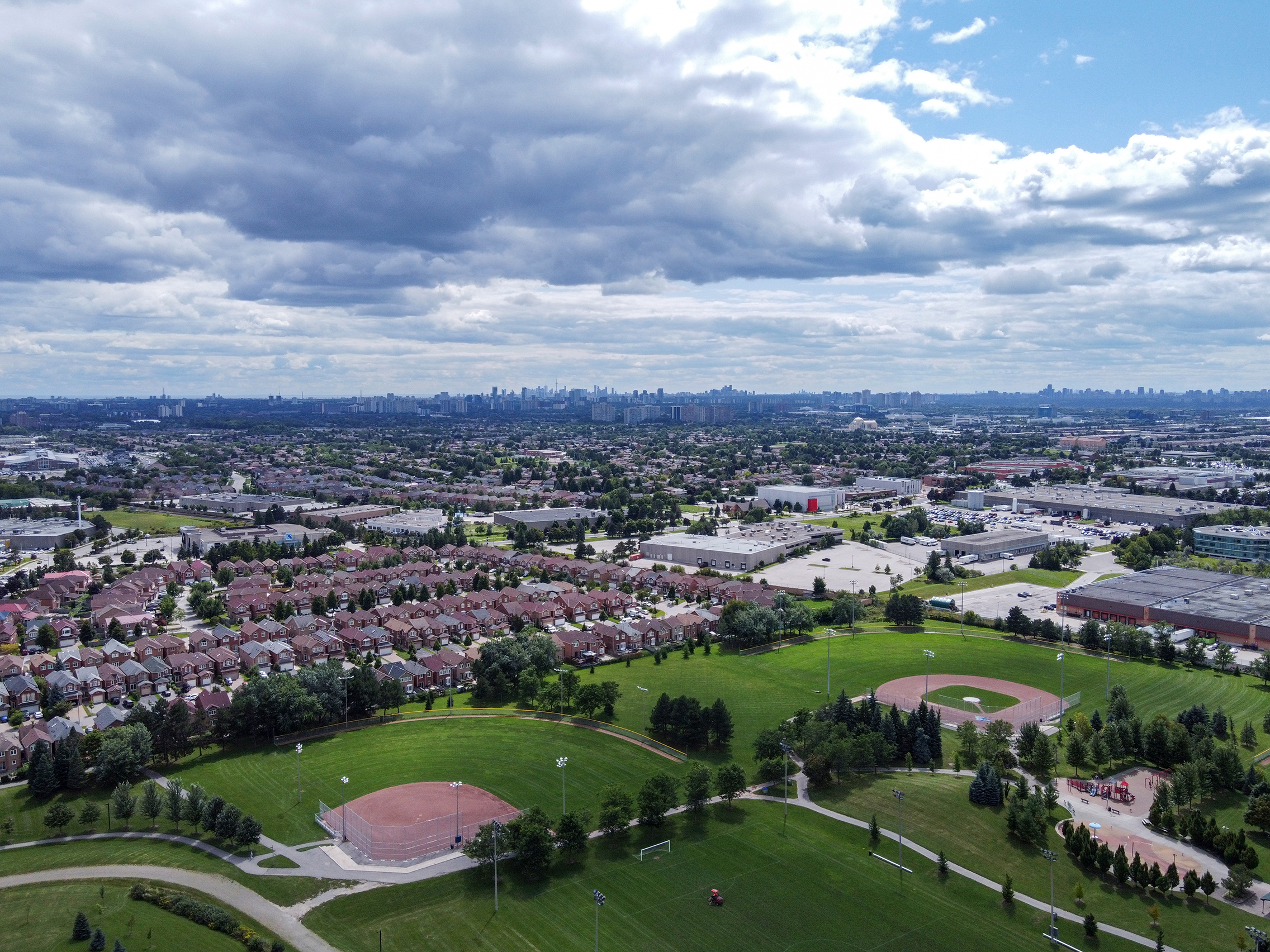
- Aerial view of Underwood, Markham in 2024
- Interactive map of Underwood
- Coordinates: 43°50′5″N 79°18′41″W
- Country: Canada
- Province: Ontario
- Regional municipality: York
- City: Markham
- Established: 1805
- Time zone: UTC-5 (EST)
  - Summer (DST): UTC-4 (EDT)
- Area codes: 905 and 289
- NTS Map: 030M14
- GNBC Code: FCYVU

Underwood is a community in the Regional Municipality of York in Markham, Ontario, Canada that is located at the corner of Warden Ave between Birchmount Road and Steeles Avenue, north up to Hwy 7. Underwood is considered part of Downtown and Uptown Markham. It is broadly considered to be part of Milliken.

The former farm land disappeared in the 1980s and is now occupied by single family homes. The north edge of the area is occupied by commercial parks.

The place is named for Underwood, Nottinghamshire, in England.

The only reminder of Underwood is sign along GO Transit Stouffville line south of Denison Street between Kennedy Road and Birchmount Road.
