= Argyle, Manitoba =

- Unincorporated Hamlet
- Motto: Small Community, Big Heart
- Location of Argyle in Manitoba
- Coordinates: 50°10′55″N 97°27′15″W
- Country: Canada
- Province: Manitoba
- Region: Winnipeg Capital Region
- Rural Municipality: Rockwood, Woodlands
- Hamlet began: 1912
- Elevation: 252 m (827 ft)
- Time zone: UTC-6 (CST)
  - Summer (DST): UTC-5 (CDT)
- Postal Code: R0C 0B0
- Area code: 204
- Website: www.argylecountrylife.ca

Argyle is a small hamlet located in the Canadian province of Manitoba. Argyle is in Manitoba's Interlake Region. It is part of the Rural Municipality of Rockwood (but just across the road from the Rural Municipality of Woodlands to the west). It is approximately 30 km from Manitoba's capital, Winnipeg. Nearby are the towns of Stonewall, Balmoral, Teulon, Grosse Isle, Gunton, Rosser, Stony Mountain and Selkirk. The major industry is agriculture, where mixed farming prevails. Many residents work in Winnipeg or surrounding towns.

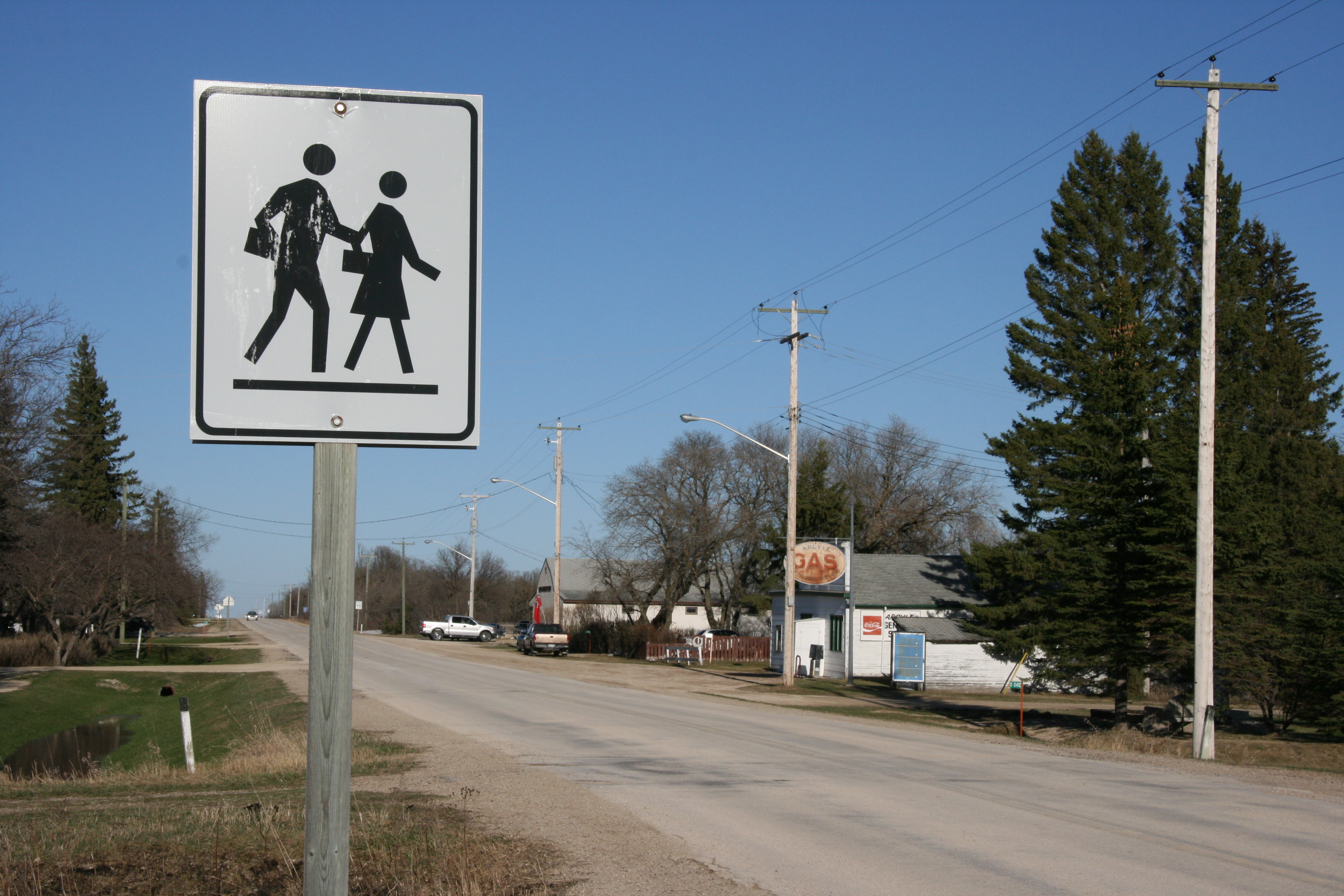
Looking East on Highway #323.

== Geographical location ==
The Principal Meridian of Canada, (Cartographic centre of Canada) dividing Eastern and Western Canada also marked the division between the Argyle and Brant Districts, as well as the mark between neighboring Rockwood and Woodlands Municipalities. As the local residents were living on either side of the Prime Meridian, several institutions derive their name by combining the words: Brant-Argyle. The Prime Meridian was the starting point during the early 1870s for crews surveying Western Canada. The Section, Township & Range system of addressing properties across the prairies begins on this line, dividing east from west.

Just north of the town is the ancient Lake Agassiz beach ridge. About 10,000 years ago, this huge inland lake, the remnants of glaciers, began to drain in present-day Manitoba. Left behind were the gravel and sand deposits that were once the beaches of the former lake. These ridges mark the northern edge of the Red River Valley, and offer a different geological atmosphere. Many local gravel pits are found in this region.

The town is located approximately 30 min north of Winnipeg off of Highway 67 from Stonewall, centered along Provincial Roads 322 and 323. Many farms and gravel companies thrive around this area. There is heavy forest and abundant wildlife everywhere.

== Early settlers ==
Settled by European pioneers during the late 1870s, the newcomers were mostly those granted 160 acres (0.65 km^{2}) of free land from the Canadian Government. This land grant was intended to encourage European farmers to settle in the vast prairies, which helped the Canadian government to claim the region between Ontario and the Pacific Ocean.

The first settlers came from Argyllshire, Scotland and named the district as Argyle in honor of their former home. The adjacent district was soon called Brant. This name was given by recent settlers from Ontario, honouring their former regions that were named after Joseph Brant, the famous Mohawk leader who assisted the British during the American war of Independence.

In 1878 the residents gathered in the Guthrie home to attend Presbyterian church services. In 1881 they built a small church on the East side of the Prime Meridian, called Brant-Argyle Presbyterian Church. The surrounding land was made into a cemetery; the earliest settlers buried their dead here.

The Brant-Argyle Cemetery is the final resting place of the local dead as well as a memorial to WWI and WWII called the Brant-Argyle Cenotaph. A small model of the church and a historic cairn are also in place at the cemetery. The church has since been converted into a home with a porch.

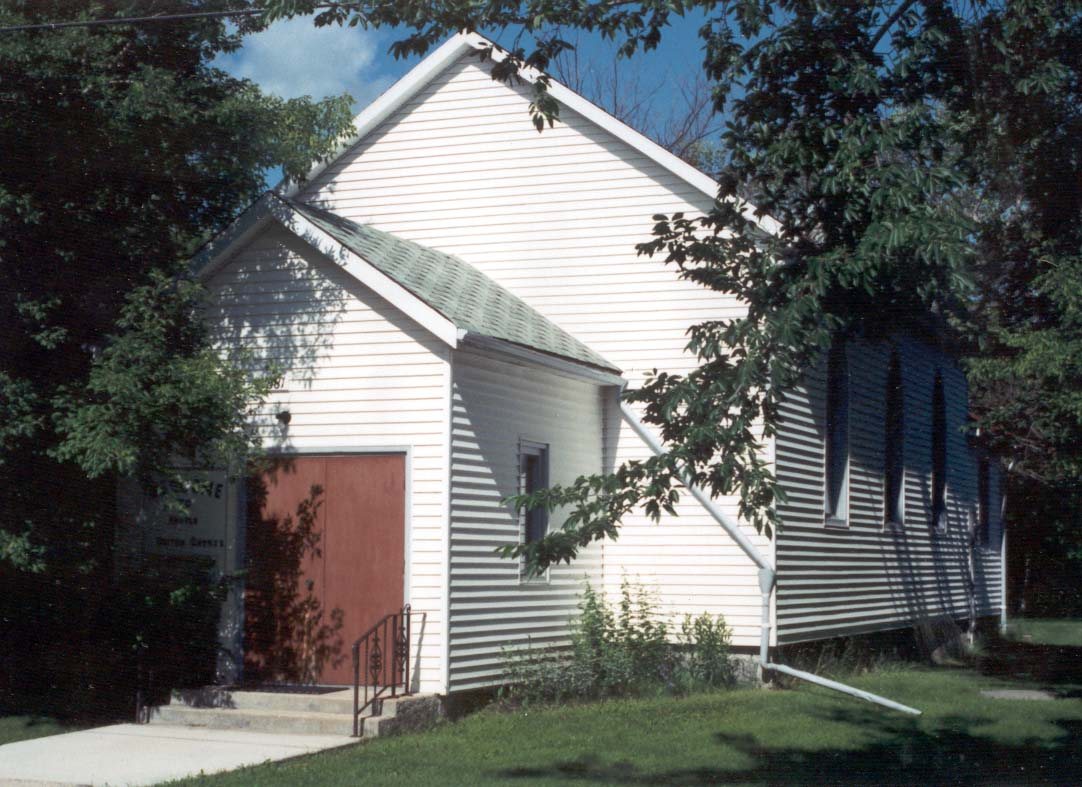
Brant-Argyle United Church c.1998

In 1878, Thomas Guthrie established the first post office in the Argyle District. At first, Guthrie had to walk to Stonewall and later in 1882 he picked up the mail as it arrived in Marquette by rail. It is said that he received $50.00 annually for postmaster and an extra $12.00 per month for carrying the mail.

In 1891, the subdistrict of Argyle had a population of 2272.

== Brant-Argyle School ==
In 1882 local one-room schools were built for the settlers' children.

Bruce School was built in the east part of the Brant district and named after Joseph Bruce, the first local settler. The school was unique in Manitoba's Interlake region, as it was made of field stone, whereas most one-room schools of the period were made of wood so they could be moved if there were population changes within the school district. McLeod School was named after Dugald McLeod, councillor of Ward 6 and one of the earliest residents to the area. Argyle School was the third of the original educational facilities that would eventually combine into Brant Consolidated School (later renamed Brant-Argyle School) in 1914.

Brant-Argyle School is a four-room brick school that is the only one of its kind in Manitoba still used as originally intended - as a school for the local community children. The school is part of a Heritage agreement certificate (as of 2003) which keeps it from being demolished, abandoned or undergoing significant architectural changes. As of June 2015, the school has about 60 students. It has a capacity of 100, and this multi-grade environment hosts kindergarten to grade 8.

== Impact of the railway ==
In 1912, a small spur line built by the Canadian Northern Railway branched off the Oak Point Subdivision at Grosse Isle heading north. This first year, the railway reached a gravel pit, possibly to supply future or existing railbeds. The next year, this new local line reached through the Argyle and Brant Districts, ending at Woodroyd, Manitoba. Eventually, the line was built to Hodgson, following a zig-zag formation to pass nearest the existing settlements.

When the railway came to the Argyle District, there was a church, post office, homes and farms. As they were spread across the country side, the nearest railstop was called Argyle Station. This was to distinguish the railway depot from the nearby post office.

With the arrival of the Canadian Northern Railway, the J.D. Douglas General Store, blacksmith shop, railway station, elevator, stock yards, section master's house and were built. Over the next few years, the post office moved to Argyle Village, more homes were built and the new Brant Consolidated School (now Brant-Argyle School) was constructed (1914). This united three small schools (Brant, Bruce & McLeod) in the region. The railway made it easier to ship materials to and from the district, in 1919 the CNoR was assumed by the Canadian National Railway which operated it until 1991. The rail bed now serves as a recreational trail for hikers, bikers, and snowmobilers in the Interlake region, called the Prime Meridian Trail.

Waghorns Guide showing Argyle c1929

== Present day Argyle ==
In 2003, the Brant-Argyle School became a Provincial Historic Site. This is recognition that it is one of the last consolidated schools in the Province, and the best example of its style.

Argyle is home to North American Rail Products Inc, a railway supplier company with locations in Delta, British Columbia, Sinking Spring, Pennsylvania and Emburn, Ontario. This facility uses the former Leo's Sales & Service structure on the west side of Argyle.

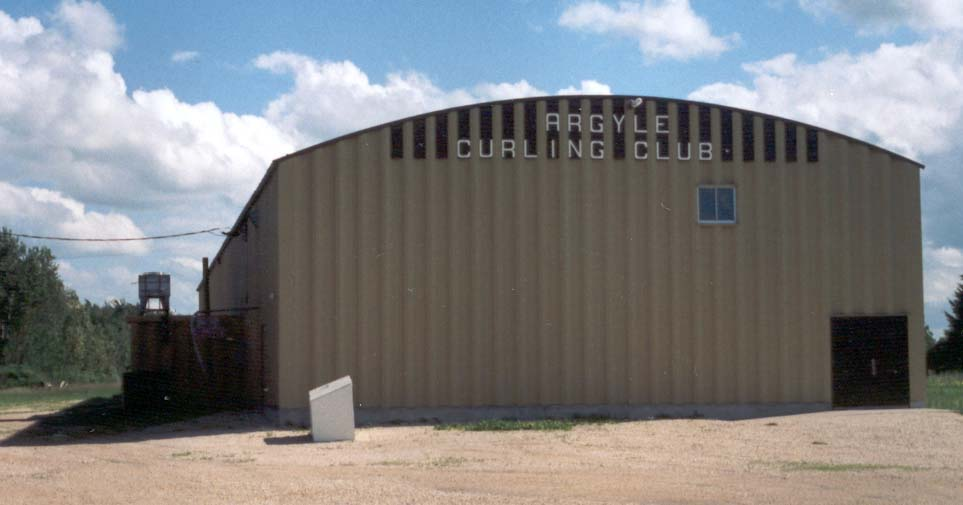
Argyle Curling Club c1991

There is one remaining business in Argyle, the general store, located between the Argyle Memorial Community Hall, and the Argyle Curling Rink. All these facilities remained used by the community and surrounding area.

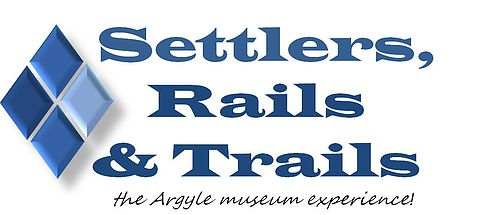
Museum Logo.

Settlers, Rails & Trails Inc. is the museum located in Argyle. It was originally called Argyle Prairie Museum (began 1991) and has become a community run, non-profit organization. It currently operates in the Argyle Community Centre, awaiting property for a permanent home. The famous Canadian Flag Collection is part of the museum, gaining notoriety for being the 2nd largest museum flag collection in the country. As of March 2017, it contains over 1,300 flags of Canada's historic, regional, sport, corporate and special events.

== Films and television shows ==
The unique small town setting that Argyle has to offer has been captured in film. The Good Life (2007)starring Bill Paxton and Chris Klein was partially shot here. The Argyle General Store was the bus stop set.

Pioneer Quest: A Year in the Real West (2000) was entirely filmed in the Argyle region. Two couples, the Logies and Treadways were the stars of this reality television series that aired on History Television. Most of the structures that were erected in the show are still standing today. The property is located north east of the village. Until recently, tours were being given of the land and the log cabins.

The Parts You Lose (2019) was partially filmed in the Brant-Argyle School during three days in January 2018.

=== Festivals & Celebrations ===
In 1970 the Brant-Argyle School held a school reunion, with meals, parades and historic displays.

1978 saw the 100th Anniversary festivities of the Brant-Argyle United Church. A Sunday church service capped off the weekend of activities centered around the church's centennial.

In the year 2000, the Brant-Argyle Homecoming was celebrated with three days of events including a parade, social/dance, breakfast and historic displays.

In 2012 the village of Argyle held the village's 100th Anniversary with a one-day event with activities, speeches, entertainment and historic displays.

In 2014, the Brant-Argyle School celebrated its 100th anniversary with speeches, entertainment and historic displays at the school in October.

== See also ==
- Royal eponyms in Canada
