= Rural Municipality of Bifrost =

Former rural municipality in Manitoba, Canada

- Former municipality
- Interactive map of Rural Municipality of Bifrost
- Coordinates: 51°03′37″N 97°08′37″W
- Country: Canada
- Province: Manitoba
- Established: December 1, 1907
- Named after: Bifröst
- Fate: Amalgamated with Village of Riverton
- Succeeded by: Municipality of Bifrost-Riverton

The Rural Municipality of Bifrost is a former rural municipality (RM) in the Canadian province of Manitoba.

It was located in Manitoba's Interlake Region along the west shore of Lake Winnipeg. It had a population of about 2,750. Its name comes from the Bifröst in Norse mythology, which is the rainbow bridge connecting Asgard and Midgard (Earth).

Originally incorporated as a rural municipality in 1907, the RM of Bifrost ceased to exist on January 1, 2015, following its provincially mandated amalgamation with the Village of Riverton to form the Municipality of Bifrost – Riverton.

== History ==
Historical population
Year	Pop.	±%
1981	2,691	—
1986	2,728	+1.4%
1996	2,851	+4.5%
2001	2,967	+4.1%
2006	2,972	+0.2%
2011	2,976	+0.1%

In 1875, the Government of Canada set aside Townships 18, 19, 20, 21, 22 and 23 from the shore of Lake Winnipeg to the beginning of Range 2E for Icelandic settlement, inhabited by over 1200 Icelandic settlers. A growing population eventually necessitated the establishment of local government. As such, the Rural Municipality of Gimli was established in 1887.

Thirty years later, on December 1, 1907, the Rural Municipality of Bifrost was incorporated out of the northern part of the RM of Gimli. Bifrost took its name from Norse mythology, where Bifröst is the rainbow bridge that connects Midgard (Earth) and Asgard, the home of the gods.

The municipal offices for Bifrost were set up in Hnausa, but in 1916 the offices moved to Arborg.

On January 1, 2015, as a result of a provincially-mandated amalgamation, Bifrost merged with the Village of Riverton to form the Municipality of Bifrost – Riverton.

== Geography ==
The RM of Bifrost included the communities of Morweena, Vidir, and Hnausa. The independently governed Town of Arborg and the former Village of Riverton were within the boundaries of the RM of Bifrost. The RM also contained part of Manitoba's Moose Creek Provincial Forest.

=== Communities ===
- Finns
- Geysir
- Hnausa
- Jaroslaw
- Ledwyn
- Morweena
- Okno
- Rosenburg
- Shorncliffe
- Vidir
- Washow Bay

== Notable people ==
- James Reimer – Professional Toronto Maple Leafs ice hockey goaltender, grew up in Morweena.
- Peter Masniuk – Politician born in Morweena
- Sveinn Thorvaldson – Reeve of Bifrost from 1908 to 1914.

== In popular culture ==
In the 2014 film, Tusk, Wallace Bryton travels to Bifrost to interview a man for his podcast.
