= John Gottfried =

Canadian politician

John Charles Gottfried (October 13, 1917 in Welland, Ontario – July 28, 1980) was a politician in Manitoba, Canada. He was a New Democratic member of the Legislative Assembly of Manitoba from 1969 to 1977.

The son of Anthony Gottfried and Lena Hoffman, Gottfried came to Winnipeg at a young age with his family; they later moved to Gimli. He was educated at the University of Manitoba, and worked as a teacher for 25 years. Gottfried married Fjola Josephine Johnson in 1942. From 1946 to 1955, he served as President of the Manitoba Teachers' Society in Gimli.

He wrote his thesis A history of education in the Evergreen School Division as part of the requirements for an MEd degree in 1965.

He was elected to the Manitoba legislature in the 1969 provincial election, defeating Progressive Conservative candidate Eric Stefanson Sr. by 223 votes. In the 1973 election, he was returned over PC candidate Ted Revel by 56 votes. During his time in parliament, he was a backbench supporter of Edward Schreyer's government. Shreyer and Gottfried were, in fact, cousins.

He did not seek re-election in 1977, and did not return to provincial politics thereafter.

Gottfried died in Winnipeg at the age of 62.
