= Einar Jonasson =

Canadian politician

Einar Sigurjon Jonasson (17 June 1887 – 8 July 1935) was a politician in Manitoba, Canada. He served in the Legislative Assembly of Manitoba from 1932 to 1935, as a member of the Manitoba Liberal Party.

Jonasson was born in Mountain, North Dakota, the son of Einar Jonasson and Jonina Sigfusdottir, both Icelandic immigrants. His family moved to Canada in 1888, and he was educated at Vernon, British Columbia, and Gimli, Manitoba. He married Anna Tergersen. Jonasson served as clerk for Gimli from 1908 to 1920, as chair of the Gimli school board from 1918 to 1923 and as mayor of the Town of Gimli from 1924 to 1926. He also became the secretary-treasurer of the Rural Municipality of Gimli in 1911, and continued to hold this office into his career in the legislature.

Jonasson first campaigned for the Manitoba legislature in the 1914 provincial election as a Manitoba Liberal in the Gimli constituency, and lost to Conservative candidate Sveinn Thorvaldson by 584 votes. He was nominated again in the 1915 election, but withdrew before the vote. Jonasson campaigned a second time in the 1927 election, and lost to Ingimar Ingaldson of the Progressive Party by 225 votes.

In 1932, the governing Progressives formed an electoral alliance with the Liberals. Although he supported the alliance at the provincial level, Jonasson nonetheless challenged Ingaldson to represent the Gimli constituency in the 1932 election. He was successful on his third attempt, defeating Ingaldson by 271 votes.

Jonasson died in office in Gimli at the age of 48 after an extended illness.
