= Montebello Rock =

Annual outdoor Rock festival in Quebec, Canada

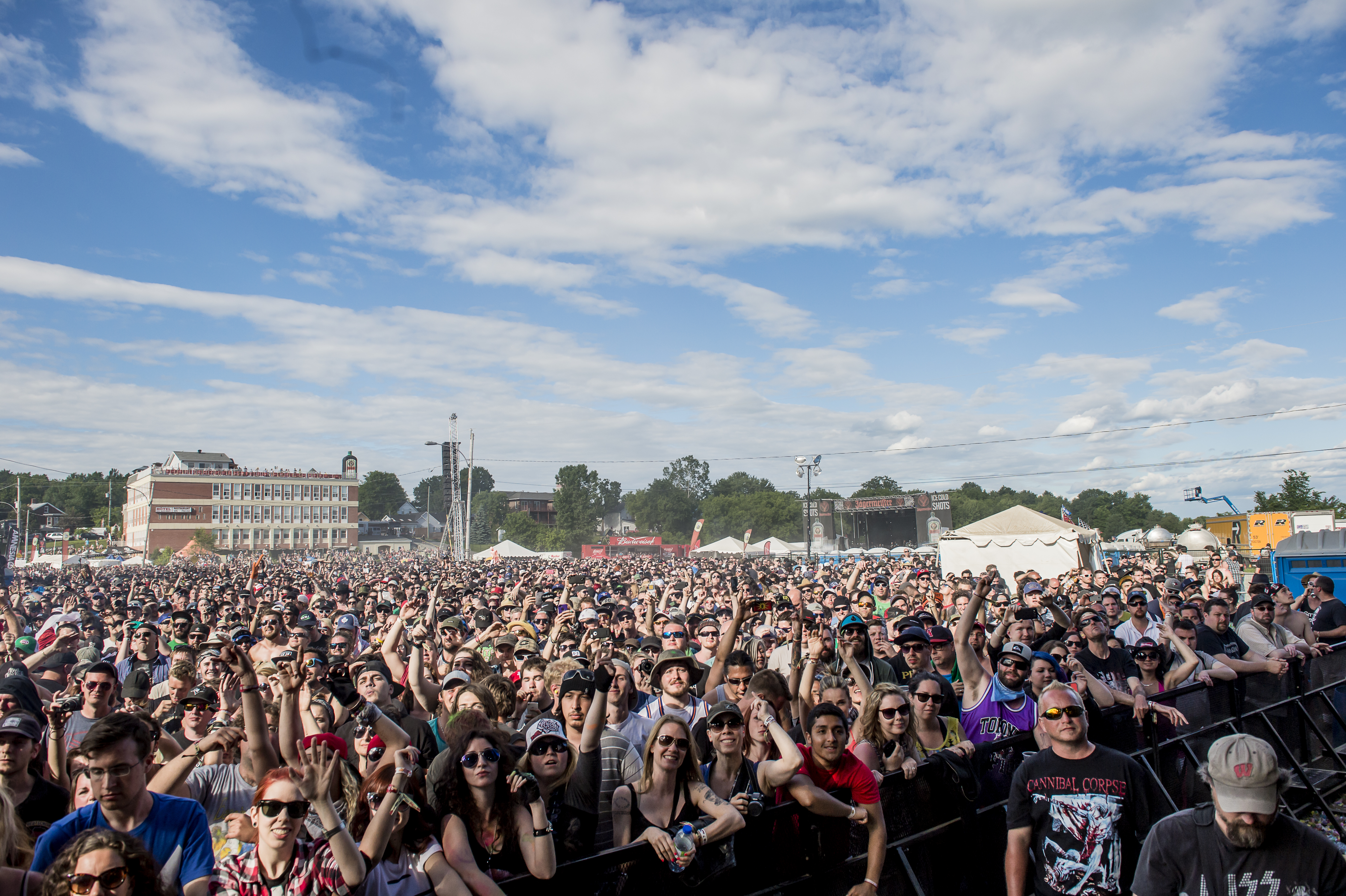
- Crowd at Rockfest 2014
- Genre: Rock; punk rock; heavy metal; hardcore punk; thrash metal; ska punk; hip hop
- Dates: June
- Locations: Montebello, Quebec, Canada
- Years active: 2005, 2007–2019
- Founders: Alex Martel
- Website: www.montebellorock.com

Montebello Rock, formerly known as Amnesia Rockfest and Montebello Rockfest, was an annual outdoor Rock festival that took place each June in Montebello, Quebec. Founded in 2005 by then-teenage local resident Alex Martel, it became the largest rock music festival in Canada and one of the largest in North America.

With a local population of 978 residents, the small town of Montebello attracted over 200,000 festival-goers during its peak years. The event offered a diverse lineup with mainstream acts, as well as cult bands, reunions, rarities and emerging talent. Aside from its lineup, the festival is known for its countryside setting, camping areas, carnival vibe and parties in the village throughout the weekend. Past headliners include Rammstein, System of a Down, Linkin Park, Blink-182, Mötley Crüe and Queens of the Stone Age.

== History ==
The festival was founded in 2005 by then teenage local resident Alex Martel. Tired of having to travel to bigger cities to attend concerts and wanting to promote his own band Deadly Apples, he decided to start his own event in his hometown of Montebello, which he called Petite-Nation Rockfest. The first edition was almost canceled due to a tornado destroying most of the site a few hours before the start of the event. Three bands played the inaugural edition, which attracted 500 attendees: Martel's band Deadly Apples opened, followed by local punk band UKKO and headliner GrimSkunk.

After a break in 2006, Rockfest came back in 2007 with the same format as the first edition and Vulgaires Machins as headliner. In 2008, the event expanded to a full day of music with two stages and was the first edition to attract attendees from outside the area, garnering press for its lineup which featured every single major Quebec band in the punk, rock and metal scenes, including GrimSkunk, Anonymus, Mononc' Serge, Deadly Apples and The Sainte Catherines.

Rockfest 2009 continued in the same format with a third stage added and featured Canadian bands such as Gob, Priestess and Mononc' Serge. The 2010 edition expanded to two days and featured more international acts such as Anti-Flag, Misfits and Alexisonfire. It was the last year that Deadly Apples performed before going on a 7-year hiatus while Martel focused on the growth of Rockfest.

In 2011, the event was renamed D-TOX Rockfest with the D-TOX clothing retailer chain becoming the title sponsor. It was the first major year for the event, featuring bands such as NOFX, Lamb of God playing their sole 2011 show, Pennywise, Hatebreed and many more.

Rockfest 2012 continued the expansion of the event with artists such as Korn, Sublime with Rome, Bad Religion and Dream Theater. Tony Sly played his last show with No Use for a Name at Rockfest 2012, before his death. Mitch Lucker also played his last Canadian show with Suicide Silence at Rockfest 2012, before his death. To honour their memories, the event named its two new hardcore and punk stages after the late frontmen the following year.

In 2013, the event was renamed to Amnesia Rockfest, as the Amnesia clothing retailer chain became the new title sponsor. The 2013 edition expanded to five stages and a larger line-up featuring Rise Against, The Offspring, Marilyn Manson, Alice Cooper, Deftones, Social Distortion, Rancid and Lamb of God. The festival tripled its attendance and received many complaints because of logistical issues. In response, organizers announced major logistical changes for 2014 by hiring the Quebec City Summer Festival production team, the Ottawa Bluesfest site coordinator and Gatineau Beerfest organizers Orkestra to handle the production, hospitality, logistics, campgrounds and parking lots.

The 2014 edition was praised by fans and critics for its massive line-up, as well as the top-notch production and logistics. Attracting a record crowd, the lineup featured Blink-182, Mötley Crüe for the first show of their Final Tour, Weezer, Alice in Chains, Megadeth, Billy Talent, Primus, Five Finger Death Punch, Cypress Hill, NOFX and A Day to Remember. Despite not officially performing at the festival that year, Rancid frontman Tim Armstrong played two secret acoustic sets on the streets of Montebello. As part of promoting the festival, Martel was interviewed by Armstrong's Tim Timebomb radio show and by Nikki Sixx of Mötley Crüe on his Sixx Sense radio show.

Amnesia Rockfest's 10th anniversary edition took place in Montebello in June 2015. The lineup was curated by Fat Mike of NOFX and Tim Armstrong of Rancid along with Martel. It was premiered by Rolling Stone and featured System of a Down, Linkin Park (which ended up being their last Canadian show before Chester Bennington's death), The Offspring (performing Americana in full), Slayer, Snoop Dogg, Rob Zombie, Deftones (performing Around the Fur in full), Tenacious D, Pixies, Rancid (performing And Out Come The Wolves in full) and Sublime with Rome. Stand-up comedy was also added to the fest with Mike Ward, Steve-O and Tom Green. As part of promoting the festival, Martel was interviewed by a nude woman on entertainment program Naked News and several of their hosts covered the 2015 edition naked.

In early 2016, it was announced that festival founder Alex Martel had become a minority partner of Rockfest while Quebec entertainment companies Just for Laughs and La Tribu became majority partners. Martel remained as spokesperson and programmer of the event. Later in 2016, famous Quebec businessman Alexandre Taillefer also became a partner in Rockfest when he bought out stakes of La Tribu through his Mishmash company.

The 2016 edition was again curated by Fat Mike of NOFX and Tim Armstrong of Rancid along with Martel. It featured Blink-182, Rise Against, Korn, Limp Bizkit, Jane's Addiction, Ice Cube, Bring Me the Horizon, A Day to Remember, Puscifer, Twisted Sister for their last Canadian performance, Lamb of God, Sum 41 and NOFX. Quebec stand-up comic Mike Ward became spokesperson of the festival and hosted a Rockfest special on his podcast featuring Martel as guest.

In 2017, the event was renamed to Montebello Rockfest and featured Rammstein, Queens of the Stone Age, Iggy Pop, Alexisonfire, The Offspring (performing Ixnay on the Hombre in full), Megadeth, Wu-Tang Clan, Bullet for My Valentine, AFI, 311, Bad Religion and Good Charlotte. Martel also reunited his band Deadly Apples at Rockfest 2017, headlining the Quebec Stage. A special opening night for Saint-Jean-Baptiste, Quebec's national holiday, featured Quebec bands such as Les Cowboys Fringants, Robert Charlebois, Les Trois Accords and Loco Locass. In order to accommodate Rammstein's elaborate show, the festival brought the biggest stage and production of its history. Organizers created a media frenzy in Quebec by inviting pop singer Jeremy Gabriel, a disabled boy with Treacher Collins syndrome who sang for the Pope and Celine Dion, to perform a metal set at Rockfest.

In early 2018, it was announced that Quebec promoter Piknic Electronik had replaced Just for Laughs as partner in Rockfest. As both partners Piknic Electronik and La Tribu were owned by Alexandre Taillefer through his Mishmash company, Taillefer effectively gained control over the festival while founder Alex Martel continued as spokesperson and programmer.

The 13th edition in 2018 featured Prophets of Rage, Five Finger Death Punch, Weezer, Godsmack, Tenacious D, A Day to Remember, Lamb of God, Stone Temple Pilots, Jimmy Eat World, Sum 41 (performing Does This Look Infected? in full), Rancid and Dropkick Murphys. In February 2018, Alex Martel was invited as a guest on talk-show Tout le monde en parle, Quebec's most watched TV show. In May 2018, it was announced that Rockfest would become the first Canadian festival to ban the use of plastic straws.

On June 21, 2018, the organizers (Outaouais Rock) filed for protection under the Bankruptcy and Insolvency Act citing an accumulated debt of over $5 million due to a massive drop in ticket sales. Organizers made the decision hoping it would allow the festival to restructure its operations and ensure its survival. Unable to come to an agreement with its creditors, Outaouais Rock officially declared bankruptcy six months later on December 21, 2018. In early 2019, it was revealed that former Rockfest majority partner Alexandre Taillefer's taxi company Teo went bankrupt as well and that many of his other projects were having financial difficulties. Alex Martel, the original founder and minority partner, released several statements criticizing the majority partners who made the decision.

In February 2019, Martel announced that Rockfest would be replaced with a return-to-the-roots type festival called "Montebello Rock" without any involvement by Rockfest's former majority partners. In March 2019, Olivier Primeau, co-owner of Montreal's Beachclub and festivals such as Metro Metro and Escapade Music Festival, announced that he was joining forces with Martel as a minority partner.

Put together in barely two months, the first edition of the newly branded and smaller Montebello Rock festival took place in June 2019 and featured MxPx, Venom, Vulgaires Machins, 88 Fingers Louie, The Sainte Catherines and more. In 2019, Martel was a guest on many podcasts to discuss the downfall of Rockfest and starting over with Montebello Rock.

In the late 2019, the festival's team put together a sold-out benefit show for a local youth homeless centre at Montreal's Club Soda with Quebec artists such as Mononc' Serge, Rymz, Obey the Brave and Deadly Apples.

In November 2019, organizers confirmed a 2020 edition and rumours speculated that the Rockfest name would return, along with the festival's formula. In January 2020, press outlets reported that Korn was confirmed for the 2020 edition. The festival announced its dates for July 2020, one month later than its usual June dates and on the same weekend that now-defunct competing event Heavy Montréal used to take place. In early 2020, all Quebec festivals were cancelled by the government until at least August 31, 2020, in the midst of the COVID-19 pandemic in Canada and Martel confirmed that a postponement was being considered. In April 2020, Fat Mike of NOFX confirmed that the band was supposed to play the 2020 edition and that the Rockfest name was back. In late April, organizers gave away camping gear to homeless shelters and lent various production equipment to local authorities to help during the coronavirus crisis. In June 2020, organizers held a Virtual Rockfest edition while Quebec was still in confinement. A classic edition of the festival was recreated in real-time during a full weekend by using archival footage. Festival-goers were invited to live the experience in their own backyards.

It was announced that Rockfest's return would be pushed back to 2021. The festival's future continued to be on ice due to the ongoing health restrictions in Quebec in 2021 as well as the uncertainty surrounding the return of live music in the context of the different COVID variants.

== Controversies ==
During the 2012 edition, a festivalgoer leaving Rockfest died near Montebello in a car accident involving a police car responding to an emergency call at the festival. The police officer, who was driving 181 kilometres per hour (112 mph) in a 90 kilometres per hour (56 mph) speed zone, was convicted of dangerous driving charges by the Quebec court at a second trial in 2019 and sentenced to community work and a $1,000 donation to a local charity.

In 2013, the event faced several logistical issues and growing pains as the attendance tripled, including sanitary problems. In response, the organizers fixed all these issues the following year by hiring the Quebec City Summer Festival production team, the Ottawa Bluesfest site coordinator and Gatineau Beerfest organizers Orkestra to handle the production, hospitality, logistics, campgrounds and parking lots. Prior to the 2013 edition, organizers received an anonymous threat accusing them of Satanism because they invited Marilyn Manson and Alice Cooper to perform at Rockfest.

In 2014, Jello Biafra dropped out of the festival when he found out that his former estranged band Dead Kennedys also got booked at Rockfest. Martel responded that both bands were slated to perform on different days, as was the case with Black Flag and former frontman Henry Rollins and with Misfits and former frontman Danzig. Despite this, Jello Biafra performed at the 2017 edition.

During the 2014 edition, porn company AD4X and adult actress Pamela Kayne recruited festivalgoers to participate in pornographic videos filmed at the festival campground in tents and RV's without the festival's knowledge. The company and another pornstar once again recruited festivalgoers at the 2016 edition, prompting Montebello's mayor to accuse AD4X of staging a publicity stunt.

At the 2014 edition, a feud erupted between NOFX and Five Finger Death Punch after the former band's frontman Fat Mike spent most of his set making fun of the latter. Five Finger Death Punch vocalist Ivan Moody responded by dedicating their song Burn MF to NOFX.

In August 2014, organizers created a publicity stunt by sending a plane with a Rockfest banner to fly all weekend above competing festival Heavy Montreal's festival grounds.

In early 2015, a Montebello resident unsuccessfully sued the festival alleging that festivalgoers trespassed on his property during the 2013 edition and caused some damage.

In May 2015, Martel was interviewed by a nude woman on entertainment program Naked News and several of their hosts covered the 2015 edition naked.

At the 2015 edition, two intoxicated festivalgoers fell off a Ferris wheel and were taken to the hospital.

In late 2015, Quebec French language activist group Impératif Français criticized Rockfest for moving its 2016 dates on the Saint-Jean-Baptiste, Quebec's national holiday weekend, while most performers at the festival sing in English. Rockfest responded humorously by releasing a new version of its poster with all band names translated in French.

After the 2016 edition, a member of the Twisted Sister crew claimed that their experience performing at the festival, as part of the Twisted Sister farewell tour, was the "worst festival ever", and urged fans to go elsewhere for subsequent years, with one of the complaints being the absence of potato chips in the dressing room. Despite the previous year's controversy, Twisted Sister frontman Dee Snider returned to perform at Rockfest in 2017 with his solo band.

In 2017, the festival created a media frenzy in Quebec by inviting pop singer Jeremy Gabriel, a disabled man with Treacher Collins syndrome who sang for the Pope and Celine Dion, to perform a metal set at Rockfest. Gabriel had become a polarizing figure in Quebec over the past years for filing a complaint with the Quebec human rights commission against comedian Mike Ward over a stand-up joke. Ward had performed stand-up comedy at Rockfest 2015 and was the spokesperson for Rockfest 2016. The publicity stunt resulted in death threats against Gabriel with a Montreal resident arrested by local police and sentenced to 30 days in prison. Porn company AD4X sparked further controversy by offering $10,000 to Gabriel to shoot a pornographic film at the festival with adult actress Vandal Vyxen. In May 2018, Gabriel threatened to sue the festival after it leaked a photo depicting Gabriel using drugs at Rockfest.

At the 2017 edition, a festivalgoer in his 60s was found dead in the streets of Montebello after suffering a stroke.

In April 2018, Rockfest announced it would become the first festival to allow marijuana during the event following legalization of the drug in Canada.

In May 2018, ska band Streetlight Manifesto was kicked off the festival for failing to honor the radius clause in its contract for a second time.

During the 2018 edition, local police dismantled a vendor trailer that was set up on the festival grounds by Support 81, a Hells Angels support group that sells merchandise of the motorcycle club.

At the 2018 edition, a 25 year old festivalgoer died of a drug overdose at the festival campground.

On June 21, 2018, the organizers (Outaouais Rock) filed for protection under the Bankruptcy and Insolvency Act citing an accumulated debt of over $5 million due to a massive drop in ticket sales. Organizers made the decision hoping it would allow the festival to restructure its operations and ensure its survival. Unable to come to an agreement with its creditors, Outaouais Rock officially declared bankruptcy six months later on December 21, 2018. In early 2019, it was revealed that former Rockfest majority partner Alexandre Taillefer's taxi company Teo went bankrupt as well and that many of his other projects were having financial difficulties. Alex Martel, the original founder and minority partner, released several statements criticizing the majority partners who made the decision. In February 2019, Martel announced that Rockfest would be replaced with a return-to-the-roots type festival called "Montebello Rock" without any involvement by Rockfest's former majority partners. In March 2019, Olivier Primeau, co-owner of Montreal's Beachclub and festivals such as Metro Metro and Escapade Music Festival, announced that he was joining forces with Martel as a minority partner.

In April 2019, punk band Anti-Nowhere League was kicked off the festival following backlash over homophobic lyrics.

Two weeks before the 2019 edition of Montebello Rock, the event was forced to move its site because of major flooding of the Ottawa River.

In July 2021, Musika Montebello jazz festival promoter Yvan Tanguay insulted Rockfest fans by claiming that his event will attract a more cultured crowd. He had made similar statements in 2019.

== See also ==
- List of festivals in Canada
- Music of Canada
