= 2012 New Democratic Party leadership election =

Party election in Canada

- March 24, 2012
- Turnout: 50.9%
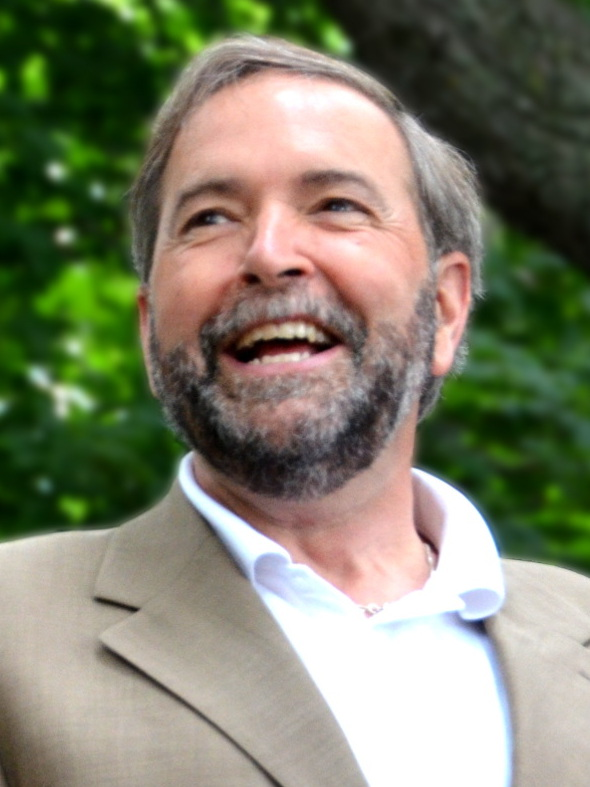

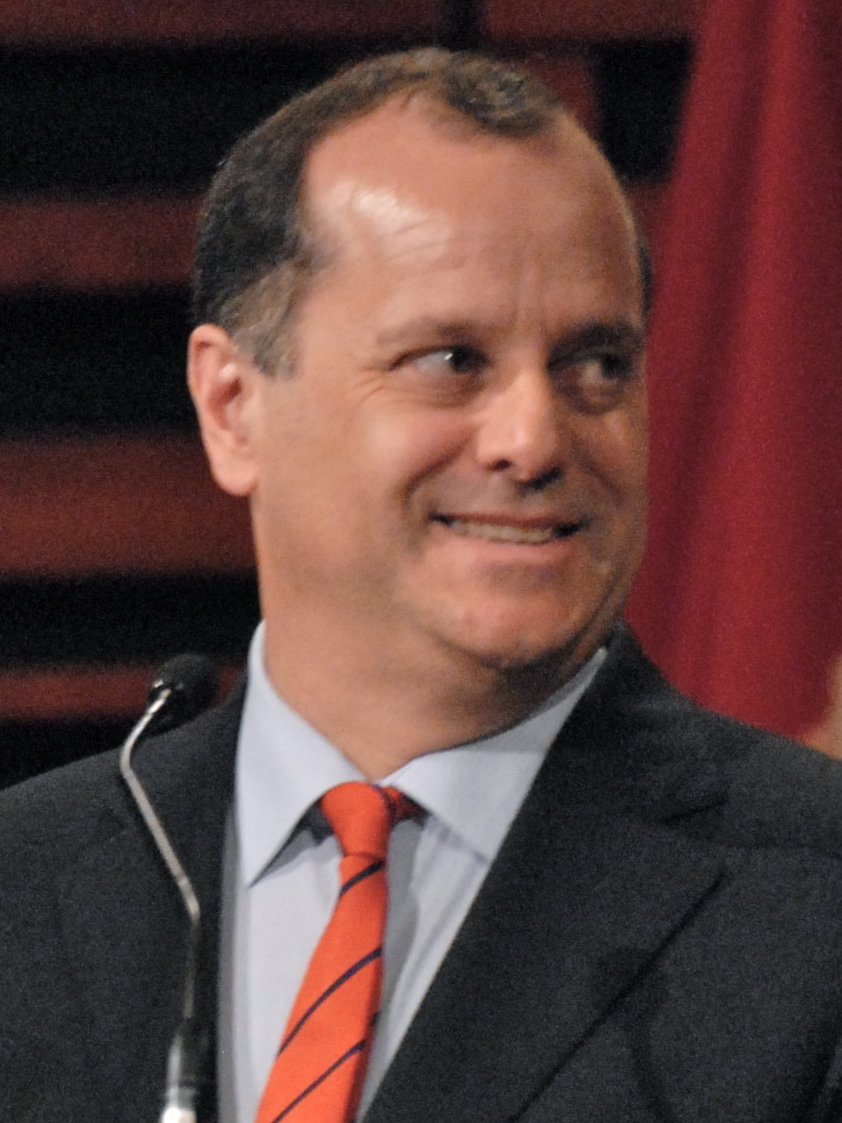

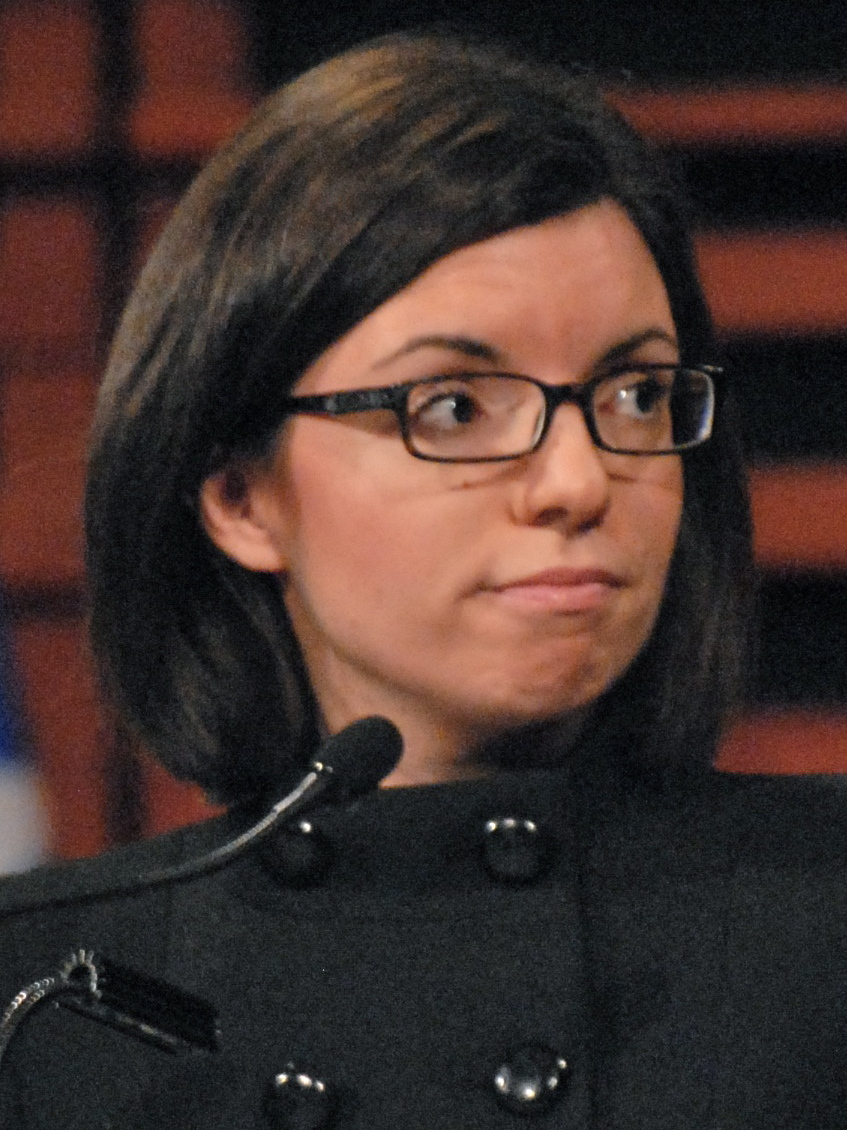
Candidate	Tom Mulcair	Brian Topp	Nathan Cullen
Fourth ballot	33,881 (57.2%)	25,329 (42.8%)	Eliminated
Third ballot	27,488 (43.8%)	19,822 (31.6%)	15,426 (24.6%)
Second ballot	23,902 (38.3%)	15,624 (25.0%)	12,449 (19.9%)
First ballot	19,728 (30.3%)	13,915 (21.4%)	10,671 (16.4%)
Candidate	Peggy Nash	Paul Dewar	Martin Singh
Fourth ballot	Eliminated	Withdrew	Withdrew
Third ballot	Eliminated	Withdrew	Withdrew
Second ballot	10,519 (16.8%)	Withdrew	Withdrew
First ballot	8,353 (12.8%)	4,883 (7.5%)	3,821 (5.9%)
Candidate	Niki Ashton
Fourth ballot	Eliminated
Third ballot	Eliminated
Second ballot	Eliminated
First ballot	3,737 (5.7%)
Leader before election
Nycole Turmel (interim)
Elected Leader
Thomas Mulcair

2012 New Democratic Party leadership election
- Date: March 24, 2012
- Convention: Metro Toronto Convention Centre; Toronto, Ontario
- Resigning leader: Jack Layton (deceased)
- Won by: Thomas Mulcair
- Ballots: 4
- Candidates: 8
- Entrance fee: $15,000
- Spending limit: $500,000

In 2012, the New Democratic Party (NDP) held a leadership election to elect a permanent successor to Jack Layton, who had died the previous summer.

The New Democratic Party's executive and caucus set the rules for the campaign at a series of meetings in September 2011. The election took place in Toronto and on the Internet. At the leadership convention, held at the Metro Toronto Convention Centre on March 24, 2012, Tom Mulcair was declared to be the new leader of the party. The convention was to be held at Exhibition Place's Allstream Centre, but it was moved to the larger venue due to a greater than expected number of delegates registering for the event.

The vote was open to all NDP members in a combination of exhaustive ballot and instant-runoff voting with one member, one vote (OMOV); each member voted by preferential ballot in advance, or with a single ballot for each round on the day of the election. The entrance fee was set at $15,000 and each candidate's spending limit was capped at $500,000.

Mulcair was the NDP's seventh leader elected since its founding in 1961. Because the NDP was the Official Opposition in the 41st Canadian Parliament, he also assumed the position of Leader of the Official Opposition in the House of Commons of Canada.

== Convention timing ==
In a letter written days before his death, Layton recommended that a leadership election be held as early as possible in 2012 on approximately the same time lines as in 2003, and that Nycole Turmel, who had been appointed interim leader because of his illness, continue in that role until the election of a permanent leader. Turmel initially said that the party intended to hold the leadership election in January 2012. Others, including party president Brian Topp and Deputy Leader Tom Mulcair—both prospective candidates—called for a longer race. Topp agreed with calls for a vote later in the year, such as February or March. Mulcair said he would not run if the convention is held too early. Like Topp, he suggests a convention in "late winter or early spring". He also pointed out that such a time frame would be consistent with the last leadership election, which took 7.5 months (June 6, 2002 – January 23, 2003). On September 9, the NDP federal council set the election for March 24, 2012, in Toronto.

The longer timeline was to allow more members to be recruited in Quebec, which had low numbers of NDP members but, following the "Orange Crush" in the recent election, the bulk of the party's MPs.

== Election rules ==
The leadership election was open to all members during a convention in a combination of exhaustive ballot and instant-runoff voting. Votes mailed in advance were cast by instant-runoff voting, but votes on the day, either at the convention or online, were for one round only. Candidates could withdraw before being formally eliminated and release preferences to lower down candidates who stay in. In the 2003 leadership election, members were able to vote in person at the convention, by mail, or online. Also in that election, affiliated organizations (such as trade unions) were allotted a minimum of 25 percent of the vote, with the remainder held by individual party members. The party's federal executive ruled in September 2011 that a 2006 change to the party constitution mandating one member, one vote precluded a carve-out for affiliated groups.

Party president and leadership candidate Brian Topp supported retaining the carve-out as did former MP Dawn Black, while MPs Thomas Mulcair, Peter Stoffer, and Pat Martin opposed it. In previous leadership elections, a union's delegates would normally vote as a block making union endorsements an important factor in the outcome.

Candidates in the campaign had a $500,000 spending limit.

On September 14, 2011, interim party leader Nycole Turmel announced rules for candidates from the federal caucus that would have members of the caucus executive, e.g., deputy leaders, to stay in their posts, but would require critics and committee chairs and vice chairs to step down if they chose to join the race.

All those who were party members by February 18, 2012, were eligible to vote and could do so in one of three ways:

1. mail-in preferential ballot;
2. by internet either by casting a preferential ballot prior to March 24, 2012, or by voting ballot-by-ballot in real time on March 24; or
3. in person as a delegate at the convention.

== Leadership debates ==
The candidates participated in six debates, in Ottawa, Halifax, Quebec City, Winnipeg, Montreal and Vancouver. The first debate was held in Ottawa on December 4, 2011, and focused on the economy. The Halifax debate on January 29, 2012, focused on families, while the February debate in Quebec City were about "Canada on the world stage", and the February debate in Winnipeg was about "Connecting people and regions".

== Timeline ==
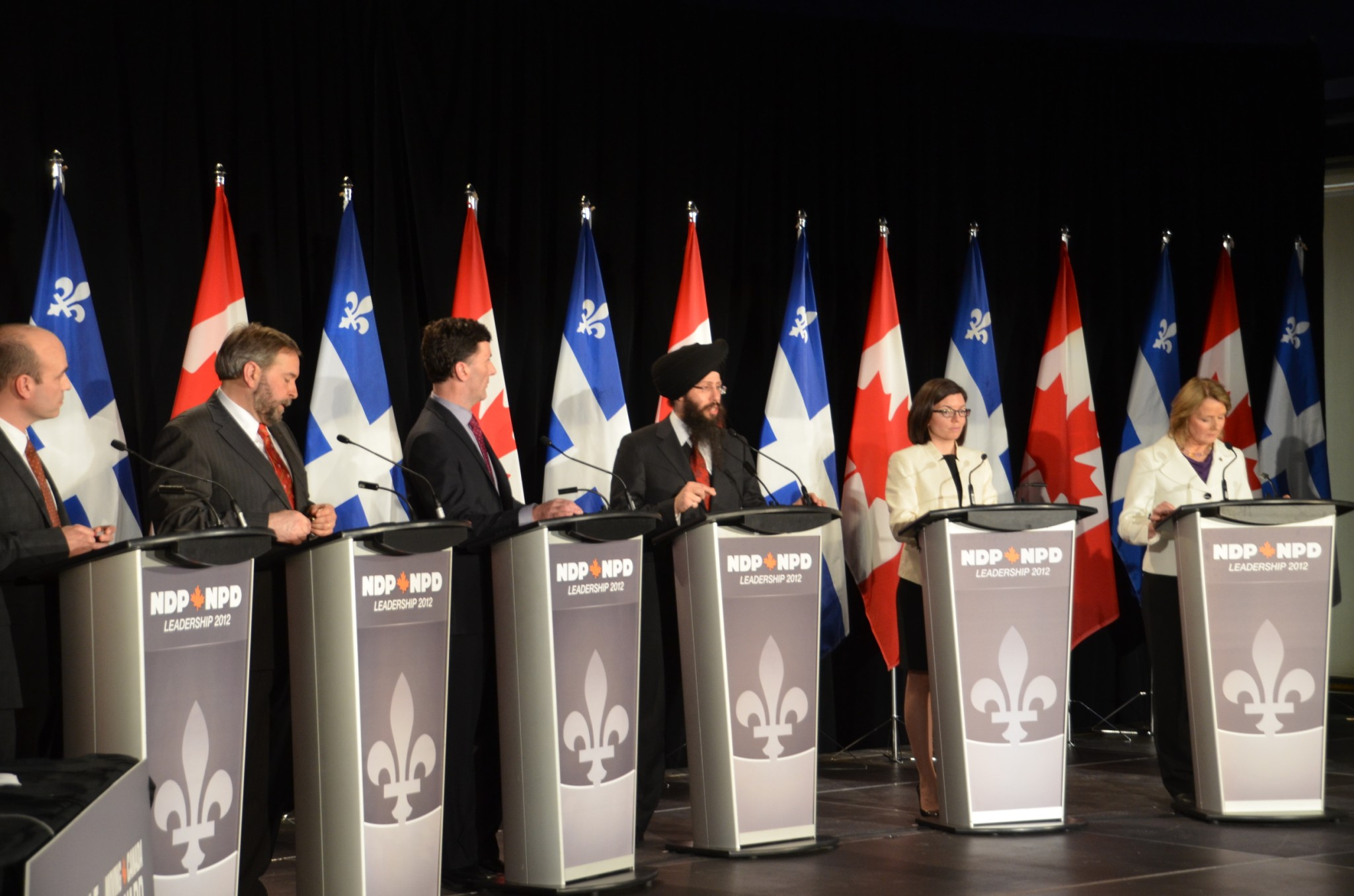
Leadership candidates debate on March 4, 2012 in Montreal.

=== 2011 ===
- May 2 – For the first time in the party's history, the NDP became the Official Opposition in the House of Commons of Canada due to the party's runner-up finish in the 2011 federal election.
- July 25 – Leader of the Opposition Jack Layton takes a medical leave of absence; Nycole Turmel is appointed acting leader of the New Democratic Party.
- August 22 – Jack Layton dies of cancer. Turmel becomes interim leader of the NDP, and acting Leader of the Opposition.
- September 9 – The NDP federal council meets to discuss the date and rules for the election, and the venue for the convention.
- September 15 – Campaign rules for caucus are announced by interim leader Nycole Turmel, official start of the leadership campaign, and nomination period opens.
- December 4, 2–4 p.m. – All-candidates debate on the economy. Ottawa Convention Centre.

=== 2012 ===
- January 18, 7 p.m. – Toronto Area Council NDP Leadership debate, Bloor Collegiate Institute, Toronto.
- January 24 – Deadline to register as leadership candidate.
- January 29, 2 p.m. – All-candidates debate on families. Spatz Theatre at Citadel High, Halifax.
- February 12, 2 p.m. – All-candidates debate on "Canada on the world stage". Palais Montcalm, Quebec City.
- February 18 – Membership deadline to join the NDP and be eligible to vote.
- February 26, 2 p.m. – All-candidates debate on "Connecting people with regions". Pantages Playhouse Theatre, Winnipeg.
- March 1 – Advance voting begins by online or mail-in ballot.
- March 1, 6:30 p.m. – Forum and Meet & Greet with NDP leadership candidates. Trinity-St. Paul's United Church, Toronto.
- March 4, 2 p.m. – All-candidates debate on "Building a strong, united Canada". Marché Bonsecours, Montreal.
- March 11, 12 p.m. – All-candidates debate on "Opportunities for young and new Canadians". CBC Regional Broadcast Centre, Vancouver.
- March 23–24 – Leadership convention in Toronto at Metro Toronto Convention Centre.
- March 24 – Last day of voting. Results announced at leadership convention.

== Candidates ==
=== Niki Ashton ===
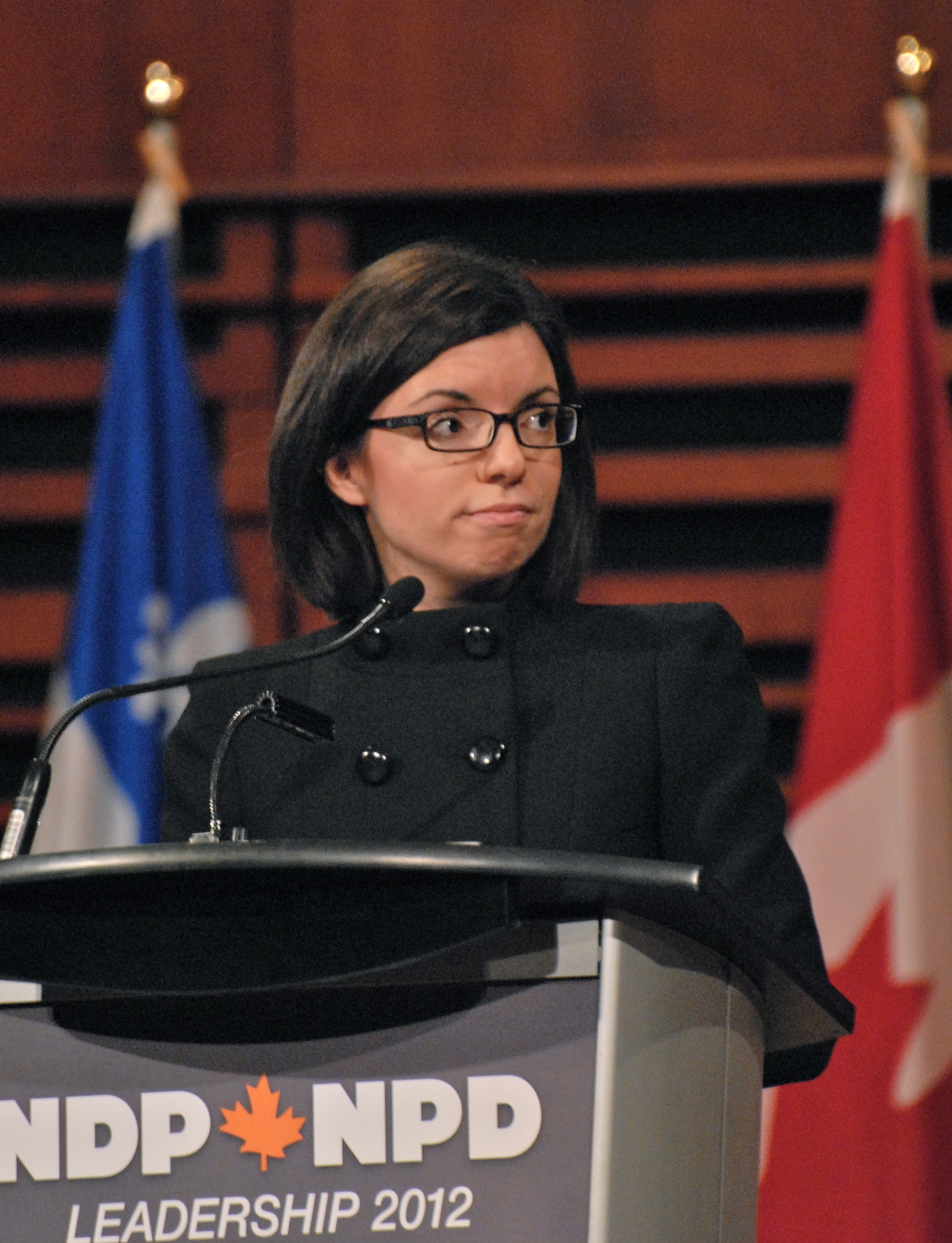
Niki Ashton

Background

Niki Ashton has been the MP for Churchill, Manitoba since 2008. Until she announced her bid, she had been the Chair of the House of Commons Standing Committee on the Status of Women. She was also a past shadow cabinet critic for Youth, and for Rural and Community Development. Ashton is fluent in Greek, English, French, and Spanish.

Date campaign launched: November 7, 2011
Campaign website: www.nikiashton.ca
Endorsements

- MPs: (4) François Choquette, Drummond; Carol Hughes, Algoma—Manitoulin—Kapuskasing; Jean-François Larose, Repentigny; Francine Raynault, Joliette
- Provincial legislators: (12) Steve Ashton, MB Infrastructure and Transportation Minister and MLA for Thompson; Peter Bjornson, MB Entrepreneurship, Training and Trade Minister and MLA for Gimli; Drew Caldwell, MB MLA for Brandon East; Guy Gentner, BC MLA for Delta North; Bidhu Jha, MB MLA for Radisson; Flor Marcelino, MB Culture, Heritage and Tourism Minister and MLA for Logan; Ted Marcelino, MB MLA for Tyndall Park; Tom Nevakshonoff, MB MLA for Interlake; Clarence Pettersen, MB MLA for Flin Flon; Frank Whitehead, MB MLA for The Pas; Eric Robinson, MB Deputy Premier, Aboriginal and Northern Affairs Minister, and MLA for Kewatinook; Michael Sather, BC MLA for Maple Ridge-Pitt Meadows
- Municipal politicians: (4) Ross Eadie, Winnipeg City Councillor for Mynarski; Tim Johnston, Mayor of Thompson, MB; Alan McLauchlan, Mayor of The Pas, MB; Harvey Smith, Winnipeg City Councillor for Daniel McIntyre
- Labour leaders: Alex Forrest, President of the United Fire Fighters of Winnipeg (IAFF Local 867)
- Organizations: New Democratic Party Socialist Caucus (its steering committee, and a majority of its members casting internal advisory votes)
- Other prominent individuals: David Chartrand, President of the Manitoba Métis Federation

=== Nathan Cullen ===
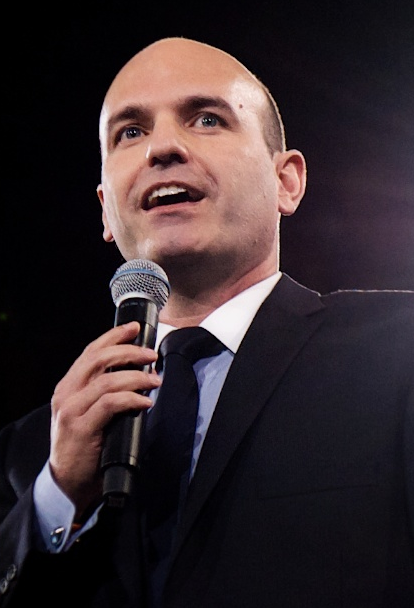
Nathan Cullen

Background

Nathan Cullen was an MP for Skeena—Bulkley Valley, first elected in 2004. Cullen was the longest-standing MP in the leadership race and the only MP to have defeated an incumbent Conservative to claim his seat. Before becoming involved in politics, Cullen worked in community and economic development throughout Latin America, North America and Africa and also started his own business, Maravilla Consultants, providing strategic planning and conflict resolution services to business, government, and non-profit agencies throughout B.C. Cullen had served as a critic in the NDP shadow cabinet, first for environment, national parks and youth, then natural resources and energy. In the 2011 Parliament, Cullen served as Chair of the House of Commons Standing Committee on Privacy, Access to Information and Ethics. He was also the Associate Critic for Natural Resources, Aboriginal Affairs and Northern Development, and Environment and Sustainable Development. In the 2011 federal election, Cullen received over 55% of the popular vote in his constituency, the highest plurality in the region since 1962. He is functionally trilingual (English, French and Spanish).

Date campaign launched: September 30, 2011
Campaign website: nathancullen.ca
Endorsements

- MPs: (4) Alex Atamanenko, MP for British Columbia Southern Interior; Fin Donnelly, MP for New Westminster—Coquitlam; Bruce Hyer, MP for Thunder Bay—Superior North; Brian Masse, MP for Windsor West (NDP trade critic)
- Provincial legislators: (5) Robin Austin, BC MLA for Skeena, Gary Coons, BC MLA for North Coast, Doug Donaldson, BC MLA for Stikine, Norm MacDonald, BC MLA for Columbia River-Revelstoke; Taras Natyshak, Ontario MPP for Essex; Jim Rondeau, Manitoba cabinet minister and MLA for Assiniboia.
- Former Provincial legislators: Lois Boone, former B.C. Deputy Premier; Corky Evans, BC MLA; Joan Sawicki, former B.C. MLA and Minister of Environment, Land, and Parks
- Former MPs: Lynn McDonald, Toronto-Danforth
- Other prominent figures: Geoff Berner, singer-songwriter; Guy Dauncey, BC environmentalist Ron Stipp, Jack Layton's campaign manager in Toronto-Danforth; Wade Davis author, National Geographic explorer-in-residence/ethnobotanist; Shane Koyczan, slam poet

Other information

- Nathan Cullen proposed a "Joint Nomination" process for Conservative held ridings, in which the Liberals, Greens and NDP will come together and choose one candidate among themselves to run against Conservatives, in that riding, to avoid splitting the vote.

=== Paul Dewar ===
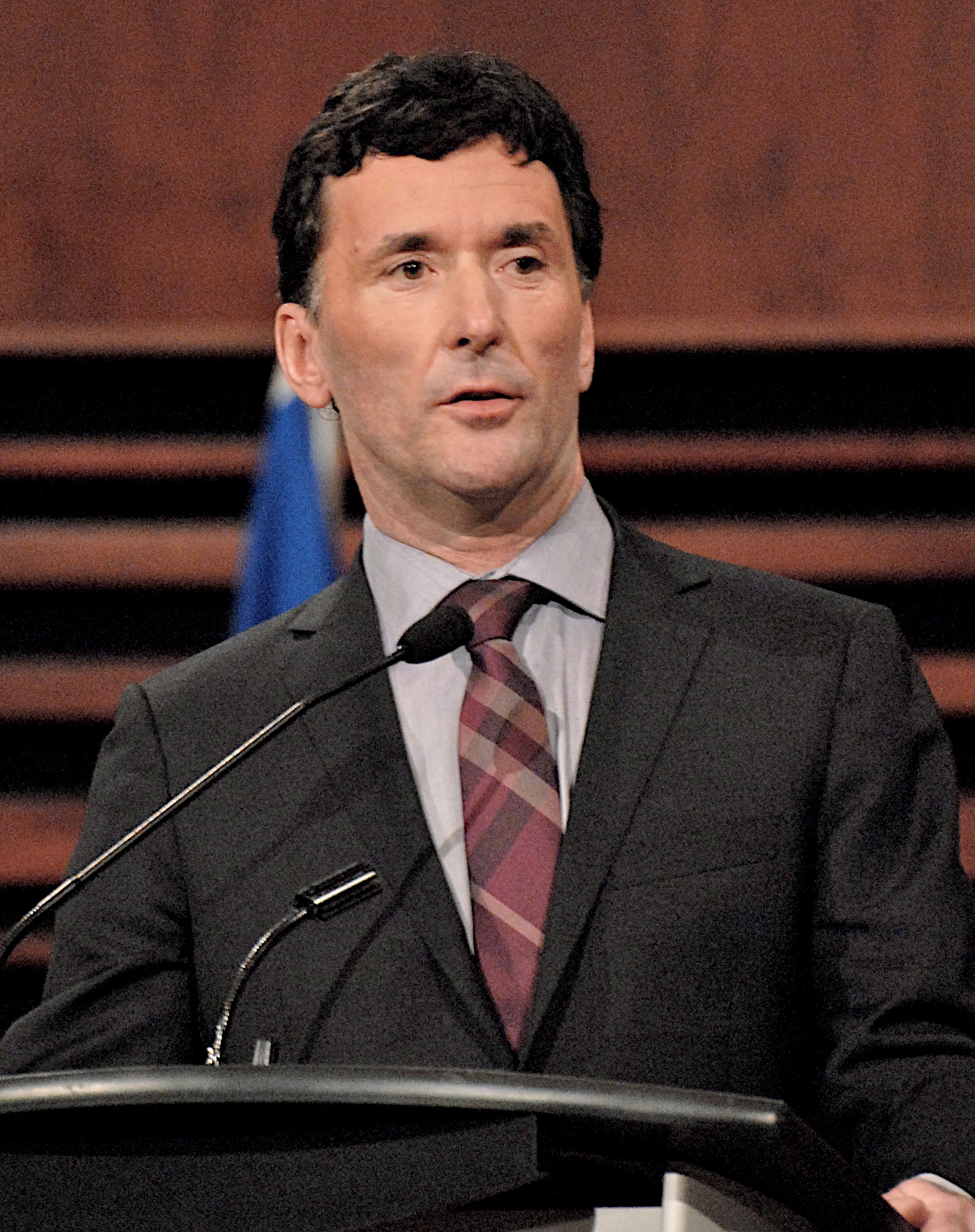
Paul Dewar

Background

Paul Dewar has been MP for Ottawa Centre since 2006, and served as critic for foreign affairs. He has also chaired the All-Party Parliamentary Group for the Prevention of Genocide and other Crimes Against Humanity. He is a former teacher and elected representative of the Ottawa Carleton Elementary School Teachers' Federation. Earlier in his career he was constituency assistant to then-MPP Evelyn Gigantes. He understands but is not conversant in French.

Date campaign launched: October 2, 2011
Campaign website: pauldewar.ca
Endorsements

- MPs: (8) Charlie Angus, Timmins-James Bay; Dennis Bevington, Western Arctic; Linda Duncan, Edmonton—Strathcona; Claude Gravelle, Nickel Belt; Hélène Laverdière, Laurier—Sainte-Marie; Hoang Mai, Brossard—La Prairie; Irene Mathyssen, London—Fanshawe; Christine Moore, Abitibi—Témiscamingue
- Provincial legislators: (16) Nancy Allan, MB MLA and Minister of Education; Kevin Chief, MB MLA and Minister of Children and Youth Opportunities; Dave Chomiak, MB MLA and Innovation, Energy and Mines Minister; Deanne Crothers, MB MLA; Greg Dewar, MB MLA; Mable Elmore, BC MLA (Vancouver-Kensington); Dave Gaudreau, MB MLA; Jennifer Howard, MB MLA and Minister of Family Services and Labour; Kerri Irvin-Ross, MB MLA and Minister of Housing and Community Development; Rosario Marchese, ON MPP for Trinity—Spadina; Theresa Oswald, MB MLA and Health Minister; Erin Selby, MB MLA and Minister of Advanced Education; Maurice Smith, NS MLA for Antigonish; Stan Struthers, MB MLA and Minister of Finance; Andrew Swan, MB MLA and Minister of Justice and Attorney General; Matt Wiebe, MB MLA;
- Former provincial leaders: (1) Michael Cassidy, former leader of the Ontario New Democratic Party and former MP from Ottawa Centre;
- Past MPs: (3) Catherine Bell former MP for Vancouver Island North; John Brewin, former MP for Victoria Tony Martin, former MP for Sault Ste. Marie
- Past provincial legislators: Rosann Wowchuk, Former MB MLA and Finance Minister; Violet Stanger, former Saskatchewan MLA
- Past municipal politicians: John Sewell, former mayor of Toronto
- Labour leaders: James Clancy, President of the National Union of Public and General Employees; Kevin Rebeck, President of the Manitoba Federation of Labour
- Other notable people: Maher Arar
- Labour organizations: International Association of Machinists and Aerospace Workers

=== Tom Mulcair ===
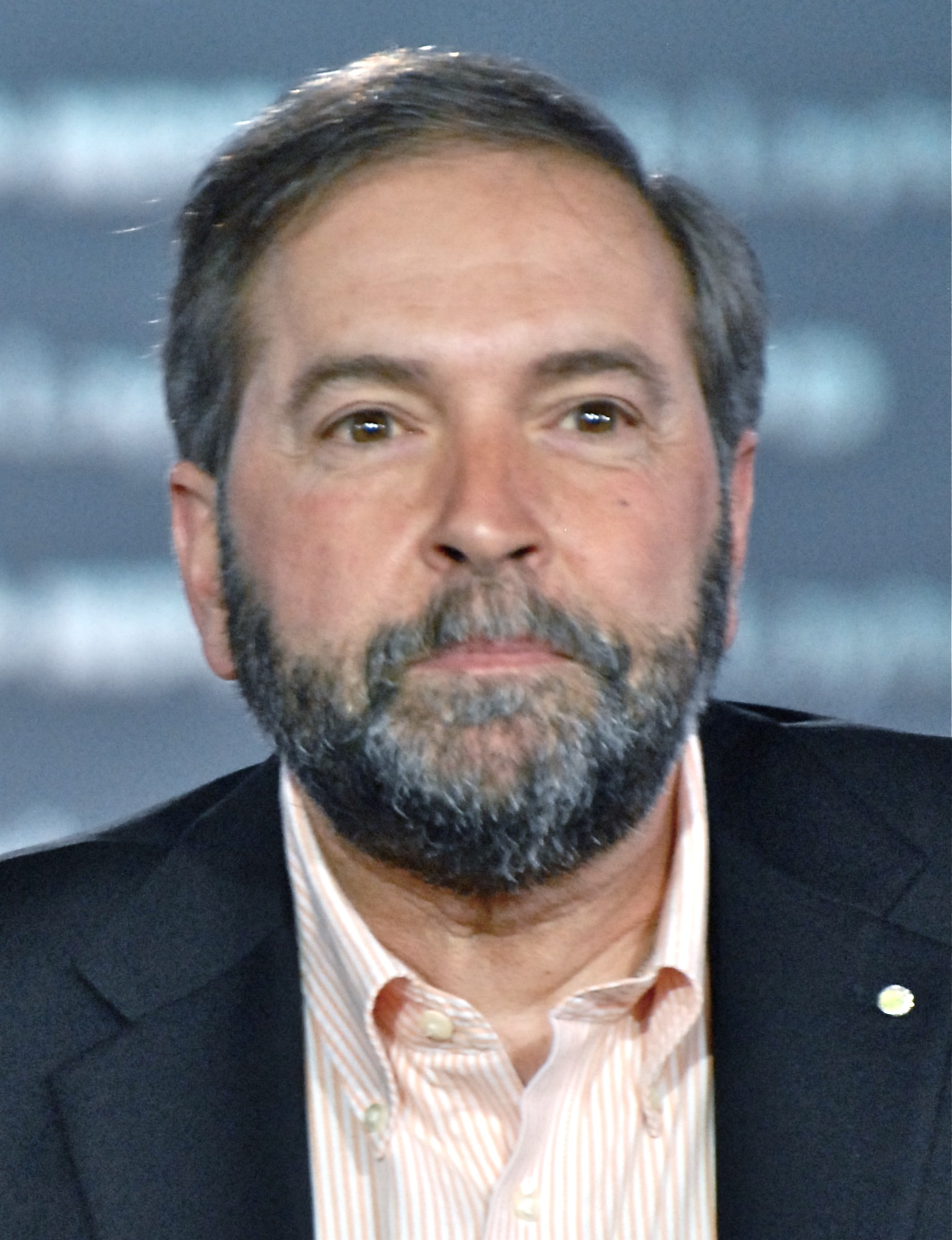
Thomas Mulcair

Background

Tom Mulcair had been the NDP MP for Outremont and one of two deputy leaders of the party since 2007, and has served as house leader and finance critic. Prior to holding elective office he was a lawyer and public official. As a member of the Quebec Liberal Party, he represented the Laval riding of Chomedey in the National Assembly of Quebec from 1994 to 2007, and was Quebec's Minister of the Environment from 2003 to 2006. The Quebec Liberals were not officially affiliated with any federal party, and the federal NDP were not officially affiliated with any provincial party in Quebec, at the time and since. His mother is French Canadian; he was raised and educated and built his career in Quebec and is fluently bilingual.

Date campaign launched: October 13, 2011
Campaign website: thomasmulcair.ca
Endorsements

- MPs: (43) Robert Aubin, Trois-Rivières; Paulina Ayala, Honoré-Mercier; Tarik Brahmi, Saint-Jean; Ruth Ellen Brosseau, Berthier—Maskinongé; Ryan Cleary, St. John's South—Mount Pearl Anne-Marie Day, Charlesbourg—Haute-Saint-Charles; Sylvain Chicoine, Châteauguay—Saint-Constant; Robert Chisholm, Dartmouth—Cole Harbour; David Christopherson, Hamilton Centre Don Davies, Vancouver Kingsway; Matthew Dubé, Chambly—Borduas; Pierre-Luc Dusseault, Sherbrooke; Pierre Jacob, Brome—Missisquoi; Réjean Genest, Shefford; Jonathan Genest-Jourdain, Manicouagan; Sadia Groguhé, Saint-Lambert; Dan Harris, Scarborough Southwest; Jack Harris, St. John's East; Matthew Kellway, Beaches—East York; Alexandrine Latendresse, Louis-Saint-Laurent; François Lapointe, Montmagny—L'Islet—Kamouraska—Rivière-du-Loup; Hélène LeBlanc, LaSalle—Émard; Wayne Marston, Hamilton East—Stoney Creek; Marc-André Morin, Laurentides—Labelle; Marie-Claude Morin, Saint-Hyacinthe—Bagot; Pierre Nantel, Longueuil—Pierre-Boucher; Jamie Nicholls, Vaudreuil-Soulanges; José Nunez-Melo, Laval; Annick Papillon, Québec; Claude Patry, Jonquière—Alma; Ève Péclet, La Pointe-de-l'Île; Manon Perreault, Montcalm; François Pilon, Laval—Les Îles; John Rafferty, Thunder Bay—Rainy River; Mathieu Ravignat, Pontiac; Jean Rousseau, Compton—Stanstead; Romeo Saganash, Abitibi—Baie-James—Nunavik—Eeyou; Djaouida Sellah, Saint-Bruno—Saint-Hubert; Glenn Thibeault, Sudbury; Philip Toone, Gaspésie—Îles-de-la-Madeleine; Jonathan Tremblay, Montmorency—Charlevoix—Haute-Côte-Nord
- Current/former provincial NDP leaders: (7) Piers McDonald former Yukon premier, Dominic Cardy, leader of the New Brunswick NDP; Herb Dickieson, former leader of the Island New Democrats; Howard Hampton, former Ontario New Democratic Party leader; Mike Harcourt, former premier of British Columbia; Edward Schreyer, former Premier of Manitoba
- Provincial legislators: (11) Buckley Belanger Saskatchewan MLA, Rob Fleming, BC MLA for Victoria-Swan Lake; Mike Farnworth, BC MLA for Port Coquitlam (provincial electoral district); Dale Kirby, Newfoundland MHA for St. John's North; Leonard Krog, BC MLA for Parksville-Qualicum; Jenny Kwan, BC MLA for Vancouver-Mount Pleasant; Ross Landry, NS MLA; Brian Skabar, NS MLA; Graham Steele, NS MLA; Claire Trevena, BC MLA for North Island; David Wilson, NS MLA
- Past MPs: (8) Phil Edmonston, first-ever elected NDP MP in Quebec; Ernie Epp, former MP for Thunder Bay—Nipigon; John Paul Harney former MP for Scarbourgh West; Lyle Kristiansen, former BC MP; Steven Langdon former MP for Essex-Windsor; Lorne Nystrom, former Saskatchewan MP and 2003 leadership candidate; Douglas Rowland, former Manitoba MP; Ian Waddell former BC MLA, MP and cabinet minister
- Past provincial legislators: (10) Eric Cline former Saskatchewan MLA, Gary Lauk former BC MLA and cabinet minister, Peter Delefes former NS MLA; Elie Martel, former MPP for Sudbury East; Shelley Martel, former MPP for Nickel Belt; Frank Mitchell, former BC MLA; Roland Penner former MB MLA and cabinet minister; David Zirnhelt, former BC MLA and Minister, Andrew Thomson former Saskatchewan MLA and cabinet minister, Harry Van Mulligen former Saskatchewan MLA and cabinet minister
- Municipal councillors: Jenny Gerbasi, Winnipeg city councillor; Darrell Mussatto, Mayor of North Vancouver
- Labour organizations: Retail, Wholesale and Department Store Union (RWDSU); Service Employees International Union; United Food and Commercial Workers (UFCW Canada)
- Labour leaders: Reg Basken, former President of the Alberta Federation of Labour; Michael Fraser, former National Director of the United Food and Commercial Workers (UFCW), and former Executive Vice-President of the Canadian Labour Congress; Bob Kinnear, President of Amalgamated Transit Union (ATU) Local 113; Art Kube, past-president of the BC Federation of Labour; Sharleen Stewart, President of the Service Employees International Union (SEUI) Canada; Wayne Samuelson, past President of the Ontario Federation of Labour
- Other prominent individuals: Michael Byers, author and former NDP candidate; Gerry Caplan, former NDP federal secretary and national campaign manager; Julius Grey, civil rights lawyer; James Laxer, political economist and runner-up in the 1971 NDP leadership election; James Lockyer, lawyer and former NDP candidate; Heather Harrison, Policy Studies Chair at Kwantlen Polytechnic University and Vice-President of the British Columbia New Democratic Party; Martin Singh, leadership candidate asked his supporters to vote for Mulcair as their second choice; Charles Taylor, philosopher; Andrew J. Weaver, climate scientist

Other Information

- Proposed a Cap and Trade system, Improving Women's Equity on boards and committees, Anti-Scab legislation

=== Peggy Nash ===
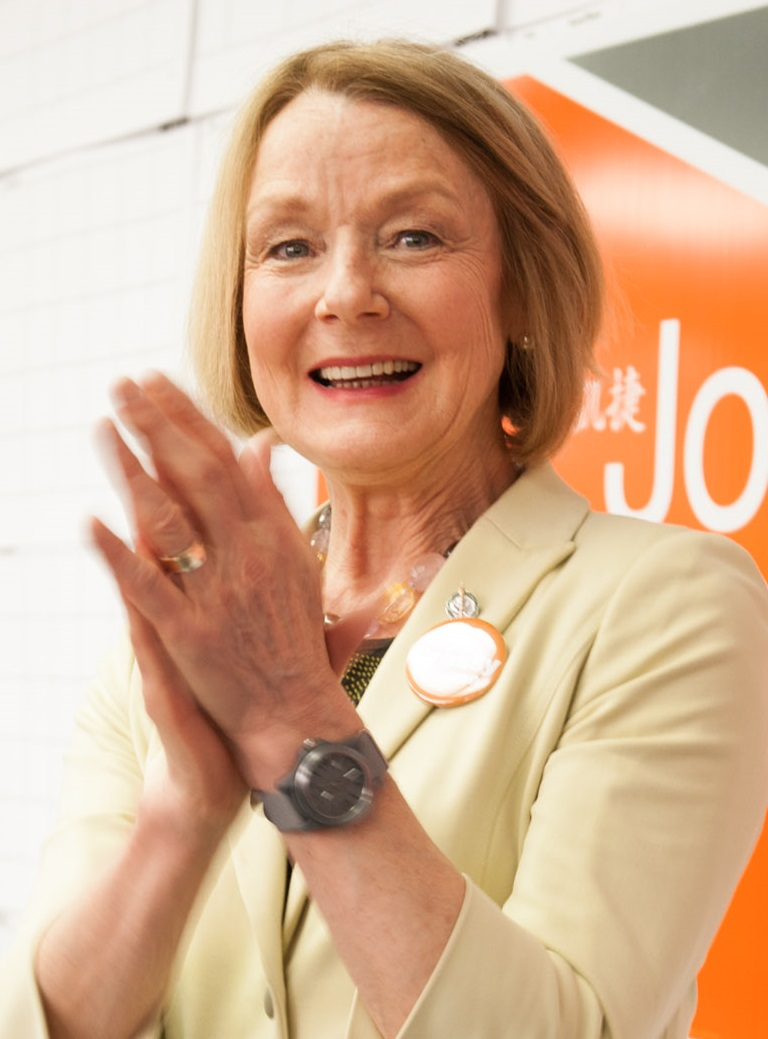
Peggy Nash

Background

Peggy Nash was the MP for Parkdale—High Park, in Toronto, Ontario until 2015. She also represented the electoral district from 2006 to 2008. Until she announced her candidacy, she was the Official Opposition critic for finance, and in her previous term in Parliament was party critic for industry. She served as the President of the NDP from 2009 until 2011. Prior to being elected an MP, she was a Canadian Auto Workers negotiator, and became the first woman in North America to negotiate a major contract with one of the "Big Three" Detroit automakers, when she negotiated a contract with Ford in 2005. She holds an honours degree in French language and literature from the University of Toronto, and is fluent in English, French and Spanish.

Date campaign launched: October 28, 2011
Campaign website: peggynash.ca
Endorsements

- MPs: (9) Raymond Côté, Beauport—Limoilou Marjolaine Boutin-Sweet, Hochelaga; Randall Garrison, Esquimalt—Juan de Fuca; Laurin Liu, Rivière-des-Mille-Îles; Élaine Michaud, Portneuf—Jacques-Cartier; Dany Morin, Chicoutimi—Le Fjord; Anne Minh-Thu Quach, Beauharnois—Salaberry; Mike Sullivan, York South—Weston; Denise Savoie, Victoria
- Past MPs: (2) Margaret Mitchell Vancouver East; John Parry, Kenora-Rainy River;
- Former federal NDP leaders: (1) Alexa McDonough, former federal leader (1995–2003) and former leader of the Nova Scotia New Democratic Party (1980–94)
- Current/former provincial NDP leaders: (1) Lorraine Michael, leader of the New Democratic Party of Newfoundland and Labrador
- Provincial legislators: (11) Pam Birdsall, NS MLA for Lunenburg; Vicki Conrad, NS MLA for Queens; Sharon Blady, Man. MLA for Kirkfield Park Cheri DiNovo, Ontario MPP for Parkdale—High Park; Cindy Forster, Ontario MPP for Welland; Spencer Chandra Herbert BC MLA, Gerry Rogers Newfoundland MHA; Marilyn More, NS MLA for Dartmouth South-Portland Valley; Leonard Preyra, NS MLA for Halifax Citadel-Sable Island; Shane Simpson BC MLA; Jonah Schein Ontario MPP
- Past provincial legislators: (7) Colin Gabelmann former BC MLA and cabinet minister, Evelyn Gillespie former BC MLA and cabinet minister, Elizabeth Cull, BC MLA and finance minister, Darlene Marzari former BC MLA and cabinet minister, Jenn McGinn former BC MLA Peter Kormos, former Ontario MPP for Welland and former provincial cabinet minister; David Schreck former BC MLA
- Municipal councillors: (13) Marianne Alto Victoria City Councillor; Maria Augimeri, Toronto city council; Constance Barnes, Vancouver Park Board; Janet Davis, Toronto Council; Heather Deal, Vancouver council; Sarah Doucette, Toronto City Councillor; Ben Isitt, Victoria City Councillor; Ron Jones, Windsor council; Michelle Kirby, Oak Bay BC councillor; Trevro Loke, Vancouver Park Board; Diane McNally, Greater Victoria School Board; Gord Perks, Toronto City Councillor; Adam Vaughn, Toronto council
- Labour leaders: Mary Lou Cherwaty, President of the NTFL; Rick Clarke, President of the NSFL; Fred Hahn, President of CUPE Ontario; Ken Lewenza, President of the CAW; Gil McGowan, President of the AFL; Lana Payne, President of NLFL; Candace Rennick, Secretary Treasurer of CUPE Ontario; Sid Ryan, President of the OFL
- Labour organizations: United Steelworkers Toronto Area Council;
- Other prominent individuals: Pierre Ducasse, 2003 federal leadership candidate, former Associate President of the party, and former Quebec lieutenant to Layton; progressive economists Marjorie Griffin Cohen, Gordon Laxer, Mel Watkins, Andrew Jackson, and Jim Stanford; actress Sarah Polley; Bill Tieleman

=== Martin Singh ===
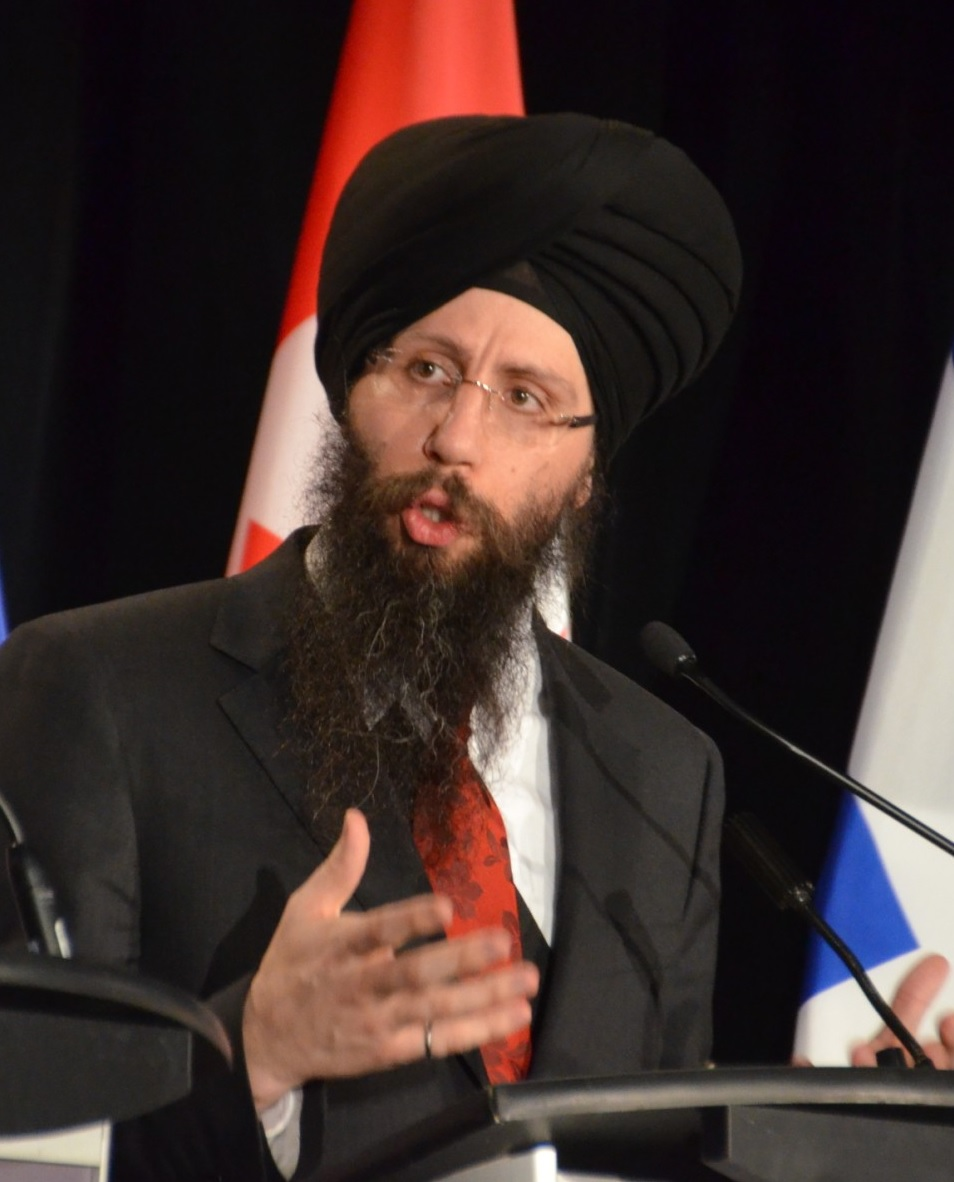
Martin Singh

Background

Martin Singh is a pharmacist from Musquodoboit Harbour, Nova Scotia, president of the NDP's Faith and Social Justice Commission and president of the Sackville—Eastern Shore NDP riding association. He aimed to build his campaign on four issues: entrepreneurship and engaging the business community, health care and the promotion of a national pharmacare plan, the environment, and the issue of leadership. He is reportedly bilingual. Named Martin Hill at birth, he changed his name to Martin Singh as part of his conversion to Sikhism; he is not related to Jagmeet Singh, who would win the 2017 NDP leadership election.

He holds three degrees from Dalhousie University, in chemistry, chemical engineering and pharmacy, and a Master of Business Administration from Saint Mary's University.

A former Liberal, Singh had been active with the NDP since the mid-1990s and is president of the party's faith and social justice commission. On December 11, 2005, he was elected president of the Maritime Sikh Society, and is the first person of non-Indian ethnicity to become head of a gurdwara in Canada.

On March 14, 2012, he announced that he planned to vote for Thomas Mulcair as his second choice, and urged his supporters to do the same.

Date campaign launched: October 2, 2011
Campaign website: martinsingh.ca

Other Information

- Proposes a National PharmaCare program.

=== Brian Topp ===
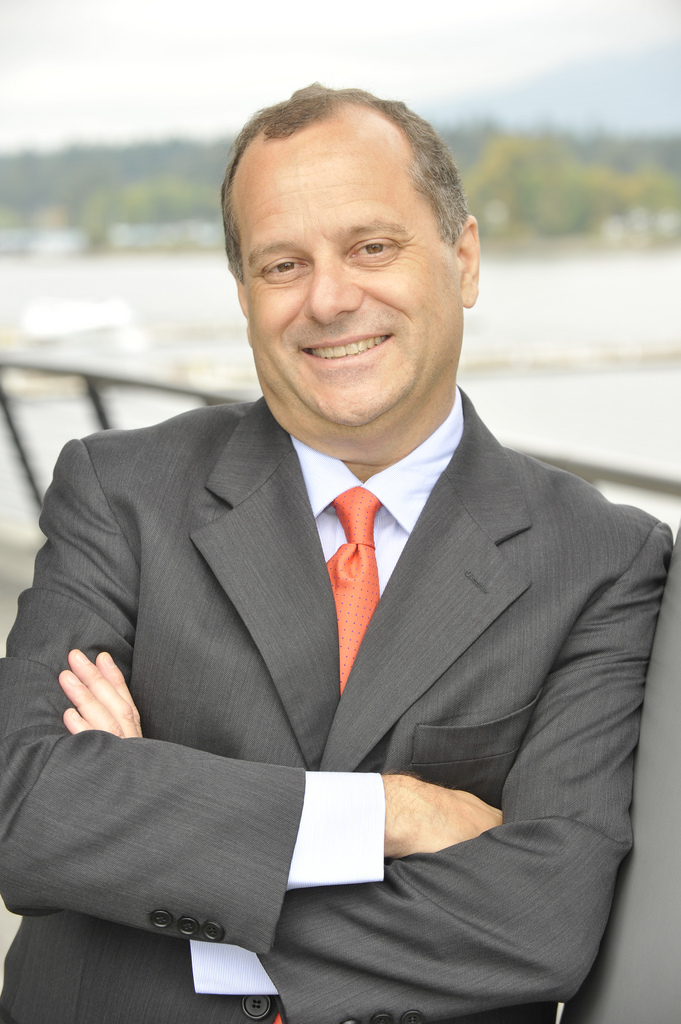
Brian Topp

Background

Brian Topp was President of the NDP from its 2011 convention; he did not participate in establishing the rules of the campaign and resigned to enter the leadership race. He was executive director and CEO of the ACTRA Toronto union local. He was previously deputy chief of staff to Saskatchewan Premier Roy Romanow (1993–2000) and senior adviser to Jack Layton during the 2011 election campaign. In the 2006 and 2008 campaigns, he served as NDP federal election campaign director. Raised in Quebec, Topp is fluently bilingual.

Date campaign launched: September 12, 2011
Campaign website: briantopp.ca
Endorsements

- MPs: (13) Françoise Boivin, Gatineau; Libby Davies, Deputy NDP leader and MP for Vancouver East; Yvon Godin, Acadie—Bathurst; Alain Giguère, Marc-Aurèle-Fortin; Jean Crowder, Nanaimo—Cowichan; Kennedy Stewart, Burnaby—Douglas; Alexandre Boulerice, Rosemont—La Petite-Patrie; Jasbir Sandhu, Surrey North; Jinny Sims, Newton—North Delta; Charmaine Borg, Terrebonne—Blainville; Isabelle Morin, Notre-Dame-de-Grâce—Lachine; Chris Charlton, Hamilton Mountain; Sana Hassainia, Verchères—Les Patriotes (previously backed Thomas Mulcair)
- Former federal NDP leaders: (1) Ed Broadbent, former federal leader (1975–1989)
- Former provincial NDP leaders: (4) Roy Romanow, former Premier of Saskatchewan; Carole James, former leader of the British Columbia NDP; Lorne Calvert, former Premier of Saskatchewan; Dan Miller, former Premier of British Columbia
- Past MPs: (7) Jim Manly, former MP Cowichan Malahat and the Islands; Lynn Hunter, former MP Saanich and the Islands; Judy Wasylycia-Leis, former MP for Winnipeg North, and Manitoba MLA and provincial cabinet minister; Bill Siksay, former MP for Burnaby—Douglas; Rod Murphy, former MP for Churchill; John Solomon, former MP for Regina—Lumsden—Lake Centre; Peter Mancini, former MP for Sydney—Victoria
- Provincial legislators: (23) Christine Melnick, Manitoba MLA and cabinet minister; Dawn Black, former MP, BC MLA, former acting leader of the BC NDP; John Horgan, BC MLA; Michelle Mungall, BC MLA; Sue Hammell, BC MLA; Harry Bains, BC MLA; Bruce Ralston, BC MLA; Jagrup Brar, BC MLA; Maurine Karagianis, BC MLA; Scott Fraser, BC MLA; Bill Routley, BC MLA; Doug Routley, BC MLA; Harry Lali, BC MLA; Katrine Conroy, BC MLA; Lana Popham, BC MLA; Kathy Corrigan, BC MLA; Raj Chouhan, BC MLA; Mat Whynott, NS MLA for Hammonds Plains-Upper Sackville; Lenore Zann, NS MLA for Truro-Bible Hill; Rachel Notley, AB MLA for Edmonton Strathcona; Warren McCall, SK MLA for Regina Elphinstone-Centre; Jim Morton, NS MLA for Kings North; Maureen MacDonald, NS MLA for Halifax Needham
- Past provincial legislators: (21) Chuck Puchmayr, former BC MLA; Gerard Janssen, former BC MLA and cabinet minister; Anita Hagen, former BC MLA and cabinet minister; Nathalie Rochefort, former Quebec Liberal MNA; John Cashore, former BC MLA and cabinet minister; Mark Koenker, former Saskatchewan MLA; Pat Atkinson, former Saskatchewan MLA; Joy MacPhail, former interim leader of BC NDP, former BC finance minister; Clay Serby, former Deputy Premier of Saskatchewan; Judy Bradley, former Saskatchewan MLA; Elwood Cowley, former Saskatchewan MLA; Darrel Cunningham, former Saskatchewan MLA; Doreen Hamilton, former Saskatchewan MLA; Deb Higgins, former Saskatchewan MLA; Judy Junor, former Saskatchewan MLA; Eldon Lautermilch, former Saskatchewan MLA; Frank Quennell, former Saskatchewan MLA; Herman Rolfes, former Saskatchewan MLA; Lorne Scott, former Saskatchewan MLA; Len Taylor, former Saskatchewan MLA; Berny Wiens, former Saskatchewan MLA
- Unions: United Steelworkers
- Other prominent individuals: Raymond Guardia, former regional executive director of ACTRA and NDP Quebec campaign director in 2011; Peter Keleghan, comedian; Doris Layton, mother of Jack Layton and widow of former PC cabinet minister Robert Layton; Derek Corrigan, Mayor of Burnaby, BC; Desmond Morton, prominent historian

Other Information

- Co-wrote the 2011 platform. He proposed a new federal income tax bracket of 35% for anyone who earns above $250,000 per year.

=== Withdrawn candidacies ===
==== Robert Chisholm ====
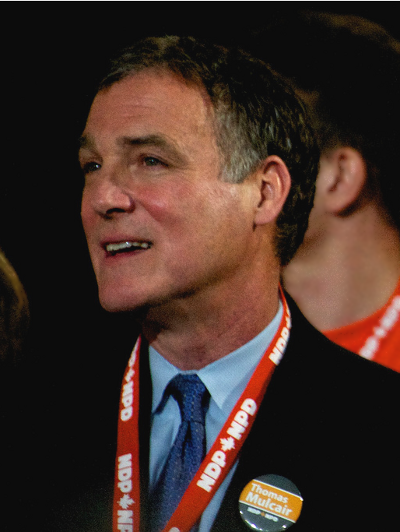
Robert Chisholm

Background

Robert Chisholm was the MP for Dartmouth—Cole Harbour, in Halifax, Nova Scotia. He was first elected federally during the 2011 election, and until he announced his candidacy, was the Official Opposition's Critic for International Trade, ACOA and the Atlantic Gateway. Prior to federal politics, he was the Leader of the Nova Scotia NDP from 1996 to 2000. In 1998, he led the NDP to official opposition, the first time since the party's predecessor Co-operative Commonwealth Federation (CCF) accomplished that feat in the 1940s under Donald MacDonald. Chisholm was a former Atlantic Regional Director for Canadian Union of Public Employees. He does not speak fluent French, although he enrolled in a French immersion course. He announced his candidacy at a press conference in Halifax, on October 30.

Chisholm withdrew his candidacy on December 21, 2011, citing his lack of fluency in French, and on February 29, 2012, endorsed Thomas Mulcair for leadership.

Date campaign launched: October 30, 2011
Date candidacy withdrawn: December 21, 2011
Campaign website: robert2012.ca
Endorsements

- MP: (1) Ryan Cleary, St. John's South—Mount Pearl, NL
- Current/former provincial NDP leaders: (2) Darrell Dexter, Premier of Nova Scotia; Howard Hampton, former leader of the Ontario New Democratic Party.
- Provincial legislators: (9) Graham Steele, NS MLA, Dave Wilson, NS MLA, Maureen MacDonald, NS MLA, John MacDonnell, NS MLA, Marilyn More, NS MLA, Bill Estabrooks, NS MLA, Becky Kent, NS MLA, Mat Whynott, NS MLA, Sid Prest, NS MLA

==== Romeo Saganash ====
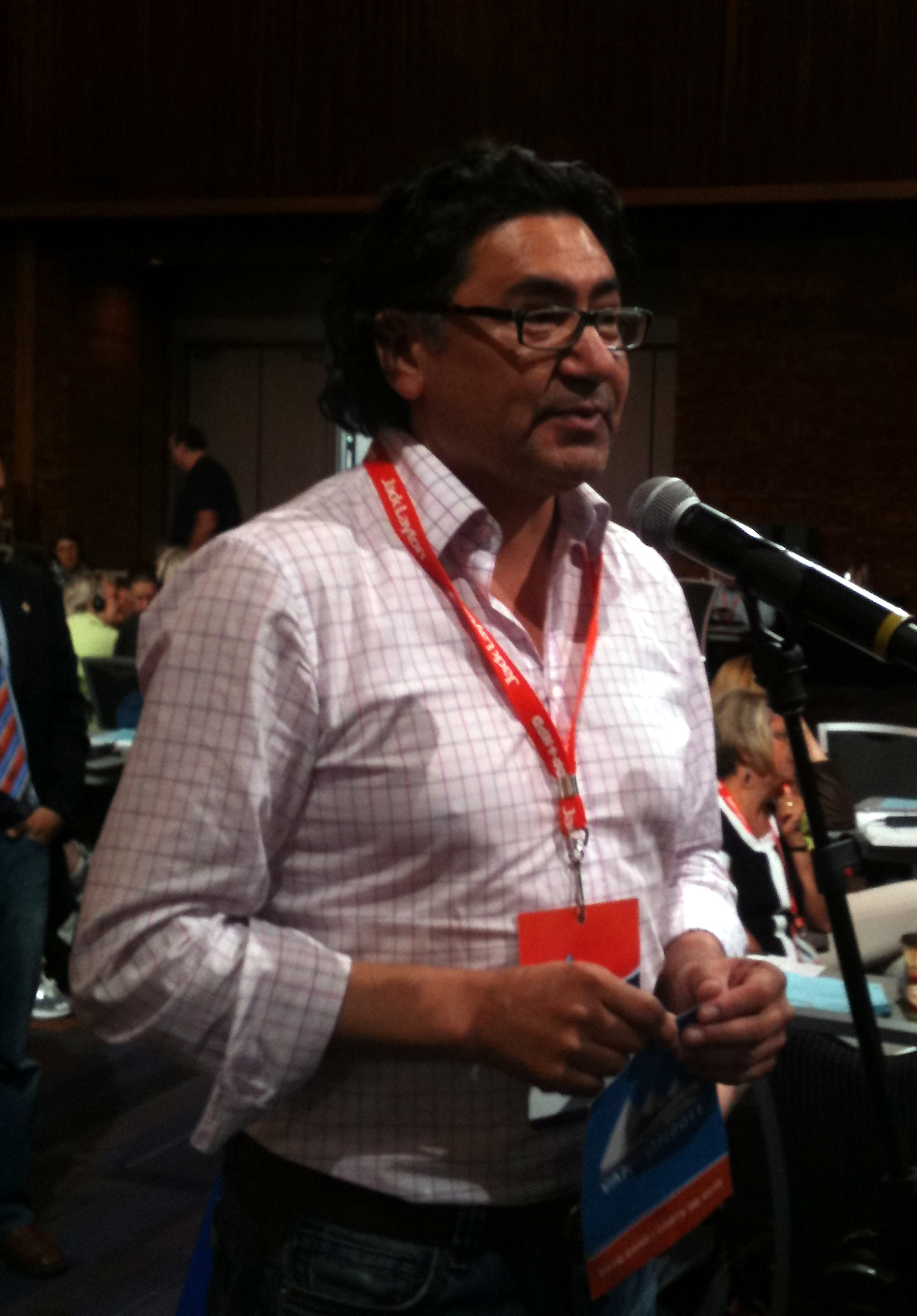
Romeo Saganash

Background

Romeo Saganash is the MP for Abitibi—Baie-James—Nunavik—Eeyou, Quebec, first elected in May 2011, and was critic for natural resources. Saganash is also former Deputy Grand Chief and director of governmental relations and international affairs for the Grand Council of the Crees and former vice-chairman of the Cree Regional Authority. He helped to negotiate the Paix des Braves agreement between the Cree Nation and the Government of Quebec. He is fluently trilingual having been raised speaking Cree, English, and French.

Saganash announced on February 9, 2012, that he was withdrawing from the race, citing illness in his family and a lack of confidence in his campaign. On March 7, 2012, he endorsed Thomas Mulcair for leadership.

Date campaign launched: September 16, 2011
Date candidacy withdrawn: February 9, 2012
Campaign Website: saganash.ca
Endorsements

- MPs: (2) Christine Moore, Abitibi—Témiscamingue; Pierre Dionne Labelle, Rivière-du-Nord
- Other prominent individuals: Marc Laferriere, former federal NDP candidate for Brant, Grant Robertson, former federal and provincial NDP Candidate for Huron-Bruce who was also the Ontario Coordinator of the National Farmers Union and Cameron Dearlove, former provincial NDP candidate for Kitchener Centre.

=== Declined ===
- Charlie Angus, MP for Timmins-James Bay
- Françoise Boivin, MP for Gatineau.
- Alexandre Boulerice, MP for Rosemont—La Petite-Patrie.
- Chris Charlton, MP for Hamilton Mountain
- Olivia Chow, MP for Trinity—Spadina, Jack Layton's widow
- Ryan Cleary, MP for St. John's South—Mount Pearl
- Joe Comartin, MP for Windsor—Tecumseh
- Libby Davies, MP for Vancouver East
- Gary Doer, Canadian Ambassador to the United States and former Premier of Manitoba
- Linda Duncan, MP for Edmonton—Strathcona
- Peter Julian, MP for Burnaby—New Westminster
- Megan Leslie, MP for Halifax
- Pat Martin, MP for Winnipeg Centre
- Anne McGrath, Jack Layton's Chief of Staff
- David Miller, former Mayor of Toronto.
- Peter Stoffer, MP for Sackville—Eastern Shore

== Polling ==
=== August 2011 ===
A poll conducted between August 23 and 28, 2011, indicated that 51% of Canadians did not know who was best to lead the NDP. Tom Mulcair and Olivia Chow each received support from 14% of respondents, while Bob Rae was selected by 9%. Brian Topp and Nycole Turmel each received 3% support.

=== September 2011 ===
A survey conducted by Angus Reid Public Opinion on September 20 and 21, 2011, found that 28% of Canadian voters would vote for the NDP if it was headed by Mulcair and 25% of Canadians would support the NDP under Topp.

A survey conducted by Leger Marketing between September 12 and 15, 2011, found that 17% of NDP supporters favoured Mulcair as leader. Topp received support from 10% of the same group. Saganash received support from 1% of Quebec NDP voters, but no support outside the province. Paul Dewar received support from 3% of NDP voters in Canada, Peggy Nash and Nathan Cullen each received 2% support and Peter Julian received 1% of the support.

A Harris-Decima poll conducted between September 1 and 4, 2011, showed support for Chow at 19%, Mulcair at 14%, Gary Doer at 6%, Paul Dewar at 3%, and Libby Davies, Topp, Peter Julian and Robert Chisholm all at 2%. Among NDP supporters, 22% would support Chow, 21% Mulcair, 7% for Doer, 4% for Dewar and Davies each, 3% for Julian and just 2% for Topp and Chisholm each.

=== December 2011 ===
A survey conducted by Forum Research for the National Post on December 13, 2011, surveyed 300 NDP supporters on their opinions for NDP leader. Of those surveyed, 47% were undecided. The remaining 53% of supporters were split between Thomas Mulcair (45%), Peggy Nash (16%) with Paul Dewar and Brian Topp at 8%.

=== January 2012 ===
A survey conducted by Abacus Data asked respondents whether they were aware of the candidates running for the leadership of the NDP. Thomas Mulcair and Brian Topp were the most likely to be known by respondents. 36% of respondents were aware of Thomas Mulcair while 31% were aware of Brian Topp. Paul Dewar (27% aware) and Peggy Nash (23%) rounded out the top four. Among NDP supporters (those who said they would vote NDP if an election were held the time of the poll), the order was the same with Mulcair (38%), Topp (32%), Dewar (27%), and Nash (21%) in the top four. Over three in ten NDP supporters had not heard of any of the candidates prior to our poll. Regionally, Mulcair's name recognition in Quebec exceeded all other competitors in all other regions of the country and his national lead in name recognition was almost entirely due to Quebecers' awareness of him. 64% of Quebec respondents were aware of Thomas Mulcair. Outside of Quebec, Mulcair's name recognition never exceeded 25%.

A Forum Research poll for the National Post on January 18, 2012, surveyed 1,200 Canadians on their opinions for NDP leader. Of those surveyed, 14% supported Thomas Mulcair, followed by 6% for Peggy Nash, 5% each for Brian Topp and Paul Dewar, 3% for Romeo Saganash, and 2% each for Niki Ashton, Nathan Cullen, and Martin Singh. Of the 300 self-declared NDP supporters, Mulcair won 19% support, again followed by Nash (10%), Topp (6%), Dewar (6%), Saganash (4%), Cullen (4%), Singh (2%), and Ashton (1%), while 48% of NDP supporters were undecided. Among decided NDP supporters, Mulcair was supported by 36%, followed by Nash (20%), Topp (11%), Dewar (11%), Saganash (8%), Cullen (7%), Singh (4%) and Ashton (3%)

=== February 2012 ===
On February 13, Paul Dewar's campaign partially released the results of an IVR poll commissioned by them and held on February 8 & 9. With responses from 6,373 households in "every region of Canada", the first choice responses weighted by NDP membership per province for decided voters were: Thomas Mulcair 25.5%, Peggy Nash 16.8%, Paul Dewar 15.1%, Nathan Cullen 12.8%, Brian Topp 12.7%, Niki Ashton 9.5%, Martin Singh 4.1%, Romeo Saganash 3.6%. 31.0% of respondents were undecided. In response, the Topp campaign responded saying their own surveys place him at 28%.

=== March 2012 ===
In the run-up to the convention, Thomas Mulcair was predicted as leading the pack.

== Convention ==
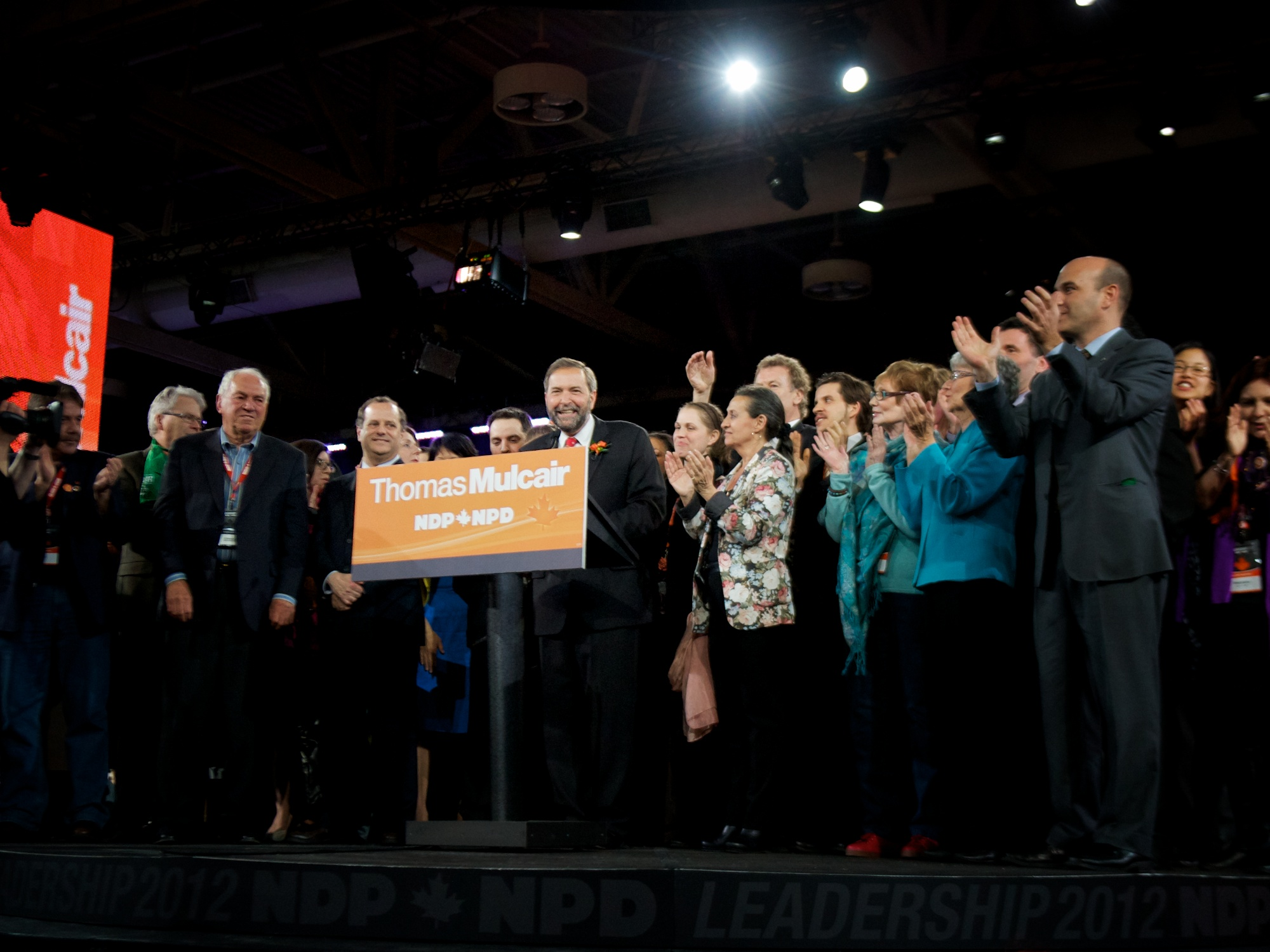
Thomas Mulcair gives his acceptance speech on March 24, 2012

Just prior to the convention opening, Brian Topp and Ed Broadbent, both defined the race as staying true to the NDP cause, by going with Topp, or moving to the centre and away from its current principles by going with Thomas Mulcair. Pundits had comparisons with New Labour in Britain under Tony Blair and Gordon Brown, with Mulcair's stance on the party.

The first day, March 23, was devoted to candidate speeches and a tribute to Jack Layton. Peggy Nash was seen by many to have bad time management skills, having run out of time, and being ushered out by music to indicate end of time. That was due to overly long introductory portion of her 20-minute allotment. Thomas Mulcair also disappointed by having to speed through his speech after a similar overly long introduction by supporters, instead of having a great speech as anticipated, to end in a timely manner and not be ushered out for being over time. Brian Topp was considered to have one of the most polished presentations, while Nathan Cullen distinguished himself by speaking without notes or a teleprompter.

Entering balloting day, pundits predicted the perceived front runner, Thomas Mulcair, would receive support in the first round between 30 and 35 percent, though some people in the Mulcair camp predicted 40 percent. Pundits expected a clear multi-ballot win if Mulcair received 35 percent or more, and a multi-ballot slugout if his share was nearer 30 percent, which would allow other challengers to catch up and beat him.

Voting for the first round ended up at roughly half the 128,351 eligible voters, lower than expected but still much higher than the usual participation rates at conventions. This was likely due to the fact that all eligible NDP members could vote, and not just convention delegates. Participation was still lower than the roughly 60% of the general electorate who voted in the last national general election however.

Most of Martin Singh's supporters, according to pundits, migrated to Thomas Mulcair, accounting for most of Mulcair's rise on the second ballot.

After Peggy Nash was eliminated in the second ballot, her supporters split fairly evenly between the three remaining candidates, for the third ballot, surprising many pundits. During the voting for the third ballot, the NDP polling site was the target of a denial-of-service attack, forcing a prolongation of the voting period, and separating voting from those at the convention and those at home.

Brain Topp ultimately finished second on the fourth and final ballot with 42.8% of the vote to Mulcair's 57.2%, allowing Thomas Mulcair to win the leadership.

=== Results ===
= Eliminated from next round
= Withdrew nomination
= Winner

Voting support by ballot
Candidate	Ballot 1	Ballot 2	+/- (pp)	Ballot 3	+/- (pp)	Ballot 4	+/- (pp)
Thomas Mulcair	30.3% 19,728	38.3% 23,902	+8.0	43.8% 27,488	+5.5	57.2% 33,881	+13.4
Brian Topp	21.4% 13,915	25.0% 15,624	+3.6	31.6% 19,822	+6.6	42.8% 25,329	+11.2
Nathan Cullen	16.4% 10,671	19.9% 12,449	+3.5	24.6% 15,426	+4.7	Did not endorse	
Peggy Nash	12.8% 8,353	16.8% 10,519	+4.0	Did not endorse			
Paul Dewar	7.5% 4,883	Did not endorse					
Martin Singh	5.9% 3,821	Endorsed Mulcair					
Niki Ashton	5.7% 3,737	Did not endorse					
Romeo Saganash	Endorsed Mulcair						
Votes cast and net change by ballot
Total	65,108	62,494	-2,614	62,736	+242	59,210	-3,526

== See also ==
- New Democratic Party leadership elections
- 2003 New Democratic Party leadership election
- 2011 Bloc Québécois leadership election
- 2013 Liberal Party of Canada leadership election
- 2011 Canadian federal election
