= Rebecca Blaikie =

Canadian politician (born 1970s)

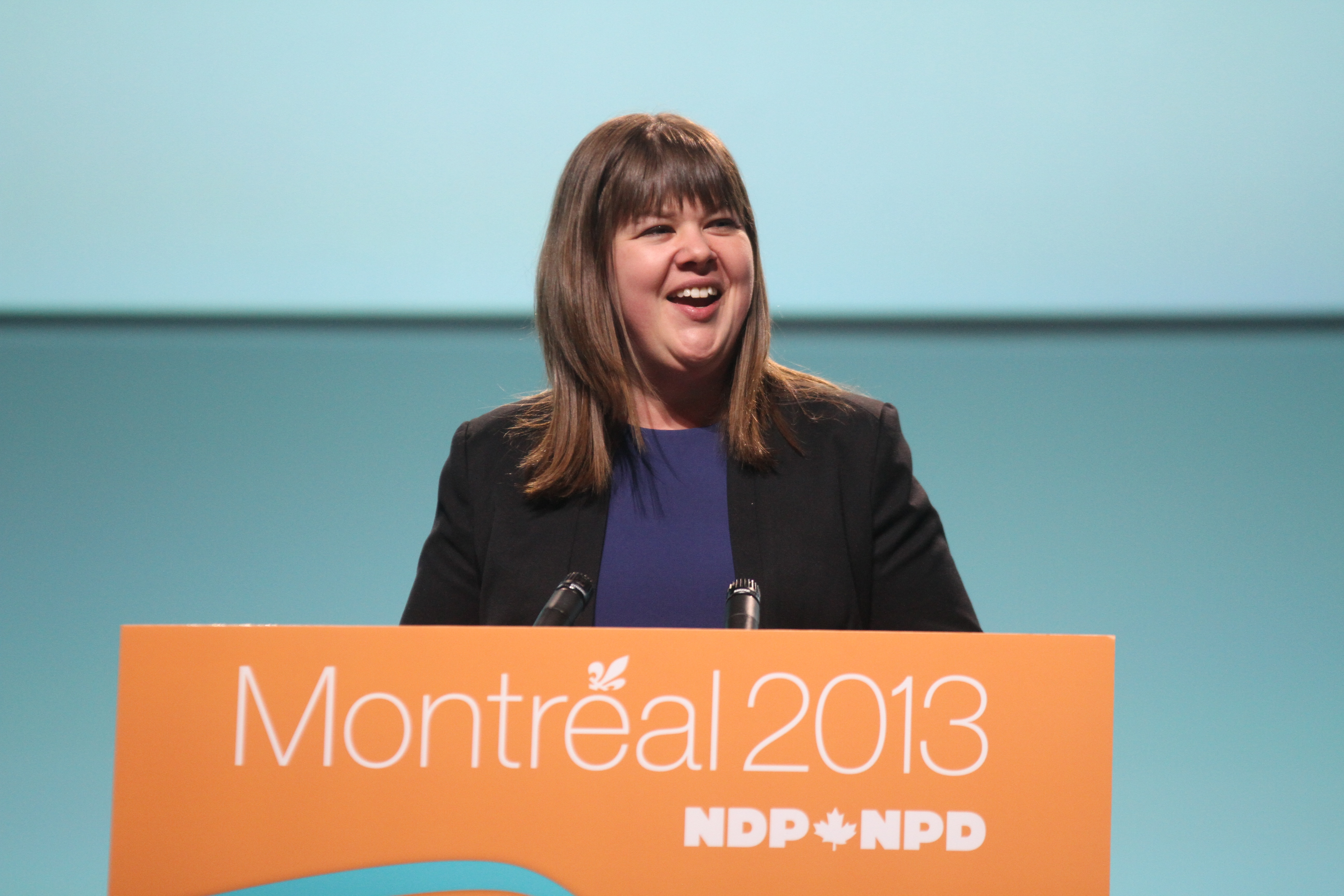
- Blaikie addressing the 2013 federal NDP convention in Montreal

President of the New Democratic Party
- In office September 12, 2011 – April 10, 2016
- Preceded by: Brian Topp
- Succeeded by: Marit Stiles

Treasurer of the New Democratic Party
- In office 2009–2011

Personal details
- Born: 1978 or 1979 (age 47–48)
- Party: New Democratic Party
- Parents: Bill Blaikie; Brenda Blaikie
- Relatives: Daniel Blaikie (brother)
- Education: Concordia University; University of Winnipeg

Rebecca Blaikie (born 1978 or 1979) is a Canadian politician, who served as president of the New Democratic Party (NDP) from 2011 to 2016.

She is the daughter of Bill Blaikie, a former NDP Member of Parliament from Winnipeg, deputy leader of the party, and provincial cabinet minister. Her brother Daniel Blaikie was elected as Member of Parliament for their father's former riding of Elmwood—Transcona in 2015.

She has an undergraduate degree in Canadian social history from the University of Winnipeg and a graduate degree in community economic development from Concordia University's School of Community and Public Affairs.

== Candidate for the New Democratic Party ==
Blaikie was a candidate for the NDP in the 2004 Canadian federal election in then-Prime Minister Paul Martin's electoral district of LaSalle—Émard in Montreal, Quebec. She received 4.4 per cent of the vote, coming in fourth place. She did, however, receive a large amount of press coverage.

As executive director of the party's Quebec wing, she was one of the architects of Tom Mulcair's historic victory in the 2007 Outremont by-election—he became the first New Democrat to win a federal seat in Quebec since Phil Edmonston in the 1990 Chambly by-election, and Outremont had voted Liberal in every election since its creation except for the Progressive Conservative win of 1988. She was also widely credited with setting the groundwork for the party's historic breakthrough in the province in the 2011 election.

She then returned to Manitoba to work for the provincial government. She ran in the 2011 federal election in the district of Winnipeg North, receiving 35.41 per cent of the vote, narrowly losing to incumbent Kevin Lamoureux of the Liberal Party by 44 votes (0.17 per cent).

== NDP treasurer and president ==
Blaikie was elected treasurer of the NDP at its 2009 convention in Halifax, Nova Scotia. She was reelected at the 2011 convention in Vancouver, alongside Brian Topp, who had been elected president. After Jack Layton's death, Topp resigned as party president to run in the leadership race. As the party's federal council may fill vacancies with one of its own members, it chose Blaikie to fill the seat of president. Blaikie was re-elected as president at the 2013 Montreal convention.

One of Blaikie's first notable acts as party president was to preside over the 2012 leadership election, which Tom Mulcair won.

Her term as president of the NDP ended in 2016. At the party's convention in April 2016, Marit Stiles was selected as her successor.

== Electoral history ==
2011 Canadian federal election: Winnipeg North
Party	Candidate	Votes	%	±%	Expenditures
Liberal	Kevin Lamoureux	9,097	35.78	-10.54	$75,214.57
New Democratic	Rebecca Blaikie	9,053	35.60	-5.57	$71,243.32
Conservative	Ann Matejicka	6,701	26.35	+15.9	$40,787.18
Green	John Harvie	458	1.80	+1.08	$0.00
Communist	Frank Komarniski	118	0.46	+0.01	$502.42
Total valid votes/expense limit		25,427	100.00	–	
Total rejected ballots		136	0.53	-0.04	
Turnout		25,563	50.01	+19.2	
Eligible voters		51,115	–		
Liberal hold		Swing		-4.97	
