= Brian Topp =

Canadian political strategist (born 1960)

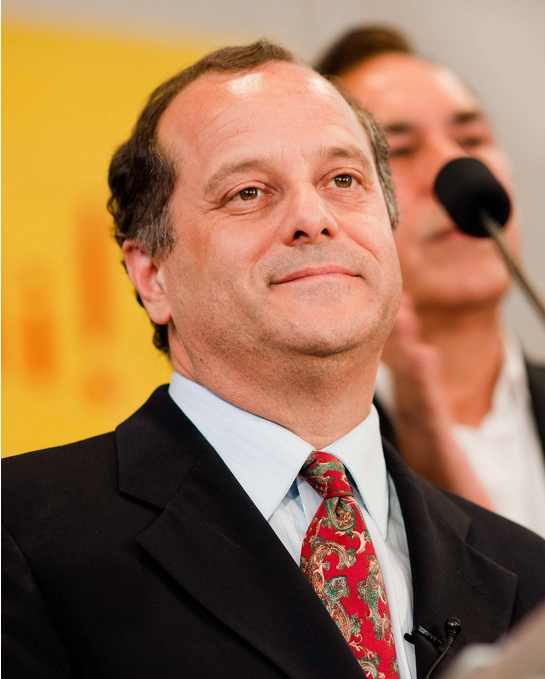
- Topp in 2011

President of the New Democratic Party
- In office June 18, 2011 – September 12, 2011
- Preceded by: Peggy Nash
- Succeeded by: Rebecca Blaikie

Personal details
- Born: July 4, 1960 (age 66) Longueuil, Quebec
- Party: New Democratic Party
- Spouse: Rebecca Elbourne (m. 1993)
- Children: Simon and Alex
- Education: McGill University
- Profession: Union leader, political organizer and strategist, writer

Brian Topp (born July 4, 1960) is a Canadian political strategist, union leader, and writer and was chief of staff to then Alberta Premier Rachel Notley. He was the runner-up for the federal leadership of the New Democratic Party (NDP) during its 2012 leadership vote, finishing behind Tom Mulcair. He has been president of the federal New Democratic Party, and was the Director of Information Services at ACTRA (the Alliance of Canadian Cinema, Television and Radio Artists) and the Executive Director and CEO of ACTRA Toronto. He also served as deputy chief of staff to Saskatchewan Premier Roy Romanow.

== Personal life ==
Brian Topp was born in Longueuil, Quebec, and grew up in neighbouring Saint-Lambert on Montreal's south shore. In addition to Montreal, Topp later lived in Somalia, Regina, Toronto, and Vancouver at various points in his life. He is bilingual. His mother was a francophone Québécoise and his father was an anglophone from the Eastern Townships. Topp's father occasionally lectured at the McGill School of Commerce during the 1970s.

In 1993, Topp married Rebecca Elbourne with whom he has two sons. His wife ran unsuccessfully as an NDP candidate in previous elections, as did his mother-in-law.

Topp is reputedly a fan of board games, particularly the strategic game Civilization.

He was portrayed by Judah Katz in the 2013 CBC Television film Jack.

== Early years, education, early career ==
Topp attended elementary school in Saint-Lambert at the francophone École Rabeau and the anglophone St. Francis of Assisi School. He attended MacDonald-Cartier High School in the Longueuil borough of Saint-Hubert for his secondary education. He studied social sciences at Champlain Regional College, a CEGEP in the Montreal-area suburb of Saint-Lambert, from 1977 to 1979. He was the editor-in-chief of the school newspaper, and was elected to the College Board of Governors where he served on the executive committee.

In 1979 he enrolled at Montreal's McGill University where he studied history and political science. While at McGill he was a senior news editor with the McGill Daily, and a member of the Scarlet Key Honour Society. As a reporter for the McGill Daily in 1981 Topp asked Bob Rae – then an NDP Member of Parliament – a "disrespectful question" and, in Topp's words, Rae "blew his stack." Topp also interviewed René Lévesque, which he called "without any question the most intimidating 10 minutes that I've ever had in my life."

In 1983 Topp founded Studio Apostrophe, a graphic design and typesetting company which produced Open City Magazine (a publication described as a precursor to the Montreal Mirror), for which Topp served as editor-in-chief. While running his print shop, Topp was introduced to the NDP by friends of his who came seeking printing services. One of his clients was Phil Edmonston, whom Topp would later aid in his successful campaign to become an NDP MP.

== Early political career (1984–2011) ==
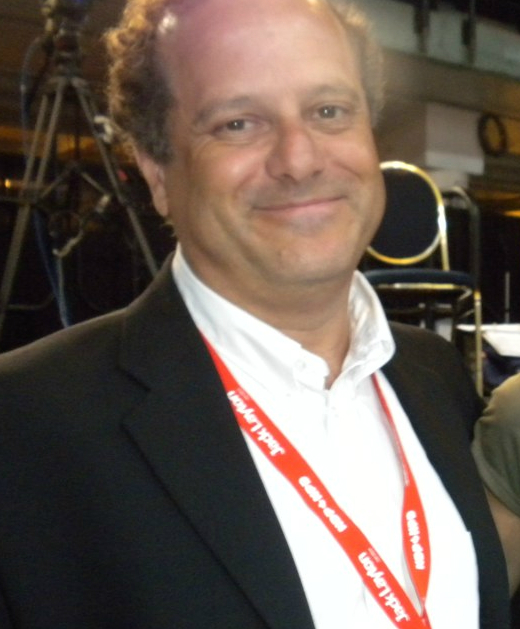
Brian Topp at the 2009 NDP Convention

=== Entry to politics: Montreal and Ottawa (1985–1993) ===
Topp has been involved with the NDP at provincial and federal levels for several decades. He joined the NDP in 1980 in order to support Ed Broadbent. Topp was active with the NDP in Quebec long before their political breakthrough in 2011; Topp first campaigned for the NDP during a 1985 provincial byelection in Montreal. He became active with the federal NDP during the 1988 election campaign, and first went to work in Ottawa in 1990 as an aide to Montreal-area NDP MP Phil Edmonston, whom he had helped become the first elected Quebec MP in NDP history.

=== Romanow government (1993–2000) ===
Topp then moved west to work with the Saskatchewan New Democratic Party as deputy chief of staff to Premier Roy Romanow from 1993 to 2000. While there he earned a reputation for being a dedicated but sometimes harsh political operator. After the 1999 provincial election he helped to keep a minority NDP government in power by striking a coalition agreement with the Saskatchewan Liberals. The coalition governed for four years until the NDP regained a majority mandate in the 2003 election under the leadership of Lorne Calvert.

=== Return to Ottawa (1997–2011) ===
Topp co-ordinated the war room for the federal NDP during the 1997 and 2004 elections. He was the party's national campaign director in 2006 and 2008. Topp served as a senior adviser to federal leader Jack Layton during the 2011 federal election campaign, and was intimately involved in negotiating the attempted Liberal–NDP coalition agreement during the 2008–2009 Canadian parliamentary dispute. Topp wrote about this experience in his memoir, How We Almost Gave the Tories the Boot: The Inside Story Behind the Coalition.

He served as an adviser to former Toronto Mayor David Miller during his successful election campaign in 2003.

He became president of the New Democratic Party in June 2011. When elected to the position, Jack Layton said of him, "[he's] one of the most principled and hard-working people I know. He's been an integral part of our team for years and is just the person we need to bring us to the next level."

Although Topp has spoken in favour of cooperation between the NDP and the Liberals, he has rejected a merger of the parties, saying, "We don't have to become Liberals to win office."

Alongside fellow NDP colleague Anne McGrath and the party leader's wife Olivia Chow, Topp was one of the few individuals who would help Jack Layton write his final letter to Canadians before he died.

== Candidacy for NDP leadership (2011–2012) ==
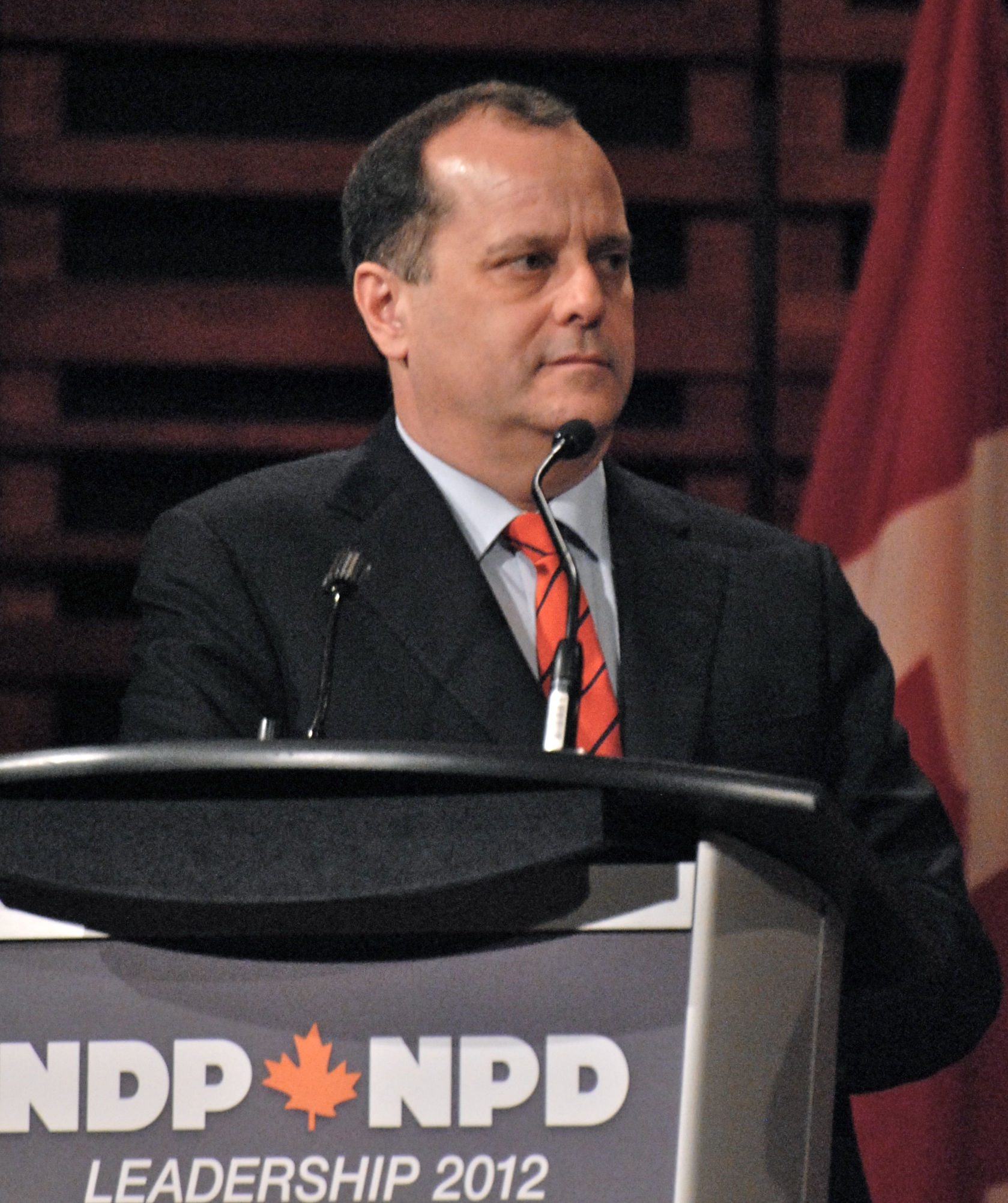
Brian Topp during a candidates debate on February 12, 2012 in Quebec City

On September 12, 2011, Topp announced that he was running for the 2012 NDP leadership race. Topp's name had been circulated as a leading candidate shortly following the death of his friend and colleague, Jack Layton. Topp indicated that if he won the NDP leadership he would seek a House of Commons seat in his native province of Quebec.

Topp had been criticized by Simon Fraser University professor Doug McArthur of using "a kind of pushy, almost bullying, operation," and noted the similarity to the aggressive tactics that were used by Paul Martin organizers in order to win the leadership of the federal Liberals in 2003. McArthur suggested that "The strategy of the Topp machine is to run over every candidate before they have a chance to really get going", quoting one of Topp's staffers who stated "let's get this leadership campaign over before it even starts", and pointing to the campaign efforts to discourage Romeo Saganash from running. Prospective candidate, Peter Julian denied that pressure was applied to him, saying the candidates have "very cordial relationships among all of us." In December, it was revealed that McArthur was actively supporting Thomas Mulcair.

=== Policy ===
In the first half of the leadership race, Topp released two policy planks – one regarding his plan to raise taxes and the other on his view of social democracy. Topp's tax plan would create a new income tax bracket for those making over $250,000 and would remove many of the loopholes and taxbreaks around capital gains and stock options. Topp has also come out in support of a Palestinian state.

On January 10, 2012, Topp released a policy document detailing the act he would introduce as prime minister that would reform parliament to reduce the powers of the prime minister, abolish the Senate and bring in Mixed-member proportional representation to the House of Commons.

Further policy releases have included his wish to reform some of the party's organizational structure, making protecting the environment a critical part of the nation's economy, protecting the arts in Canada, creating a national child nutrition program and expanding pharmacare coverage, as well as a plan to help support small businesses and guarantee better access to development capital.

=== Endorsements ===
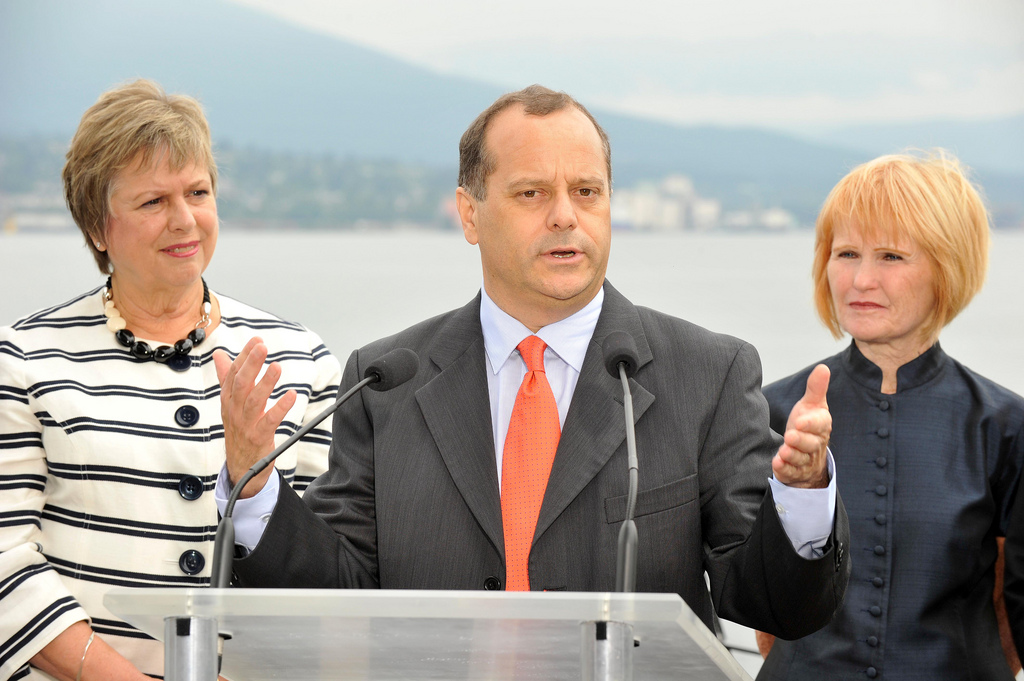
Brian Topp campaigning for the leadership in British Columbia with supporters Dawn Black and Joy MacPhail

Joining Topp at his announcement was Françoise Boivin, MP for Gatineau, and former NDP leader Ed Broadbent, who had endorsed Jack Layton's leadership campaign in 2003. Boivin had previously considered running herself. Dawn Black, former leader of the opposition in the Legislative Assembly of British Columbia, previously endorsed Topp's candidacy for the NDP leadership.

Topp picked up endorsements from nine other New Democrat MPs, including deputy leader Libby Davies. He also received endorsements from former Saskatchewan premiers Roy Romanow and Lorne Calvert, former BCNDP leader Carole James, over a dozen British Columbian MLAs and the United Steelworkers labour union.

=== Convention ===
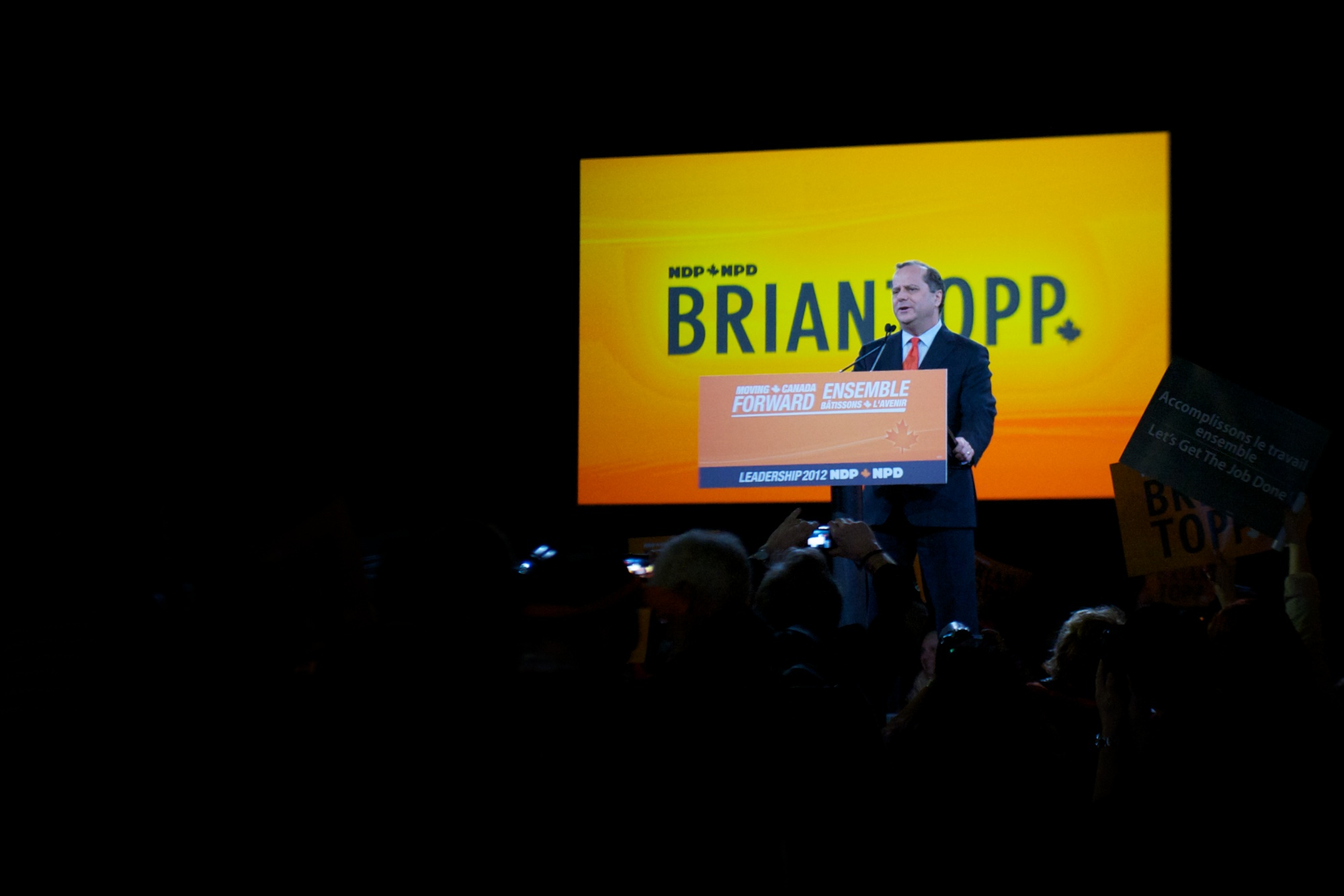
Brian Topp speaking at the 2012 NDP Leadership Convention in Toronto

Just prior to the convention opening, Topp and Ed Broadbent, both defined the race as staying true to the NDP cause, by going with Topp, or moving to the centre and away from its current principles by going with Thomas Mulcair. Pundits had comparisons with New Labour in Britain under Tony Blair and Gordon Brown, with Mulcair's stance on the party. Topp was considered to have one of the most polished presentations at the convention.

Topp trailed Mulcair from start to finish by ranking in second place on the first, second, third and final ballots, ultimately finishing with 42.8% of the vote to Mulcair's 57.2%.

== Later political career (2012–present) ==
=== BC election defeat (2013) ===
Topp was brought to Canada's West Coast by Adrian Dix, the provincial leader of the Official Opposition, to manage the 2013 election campaign for the British Columbia New Democratic Party (BCNDP). Despite starting with a significant lead in pre-election polls, the BCNDP campaign failed to prevent the re-election of the BC Liberals under Premier Christy Clark and actually won fewer seats for the party than in 2009. Topp admitted that he made certain "errors in strategy" that might have harmed the campaign.

=== Other work ===
Topp announced in early 2013 that he was joining with potential political opponents to create a new public-affairs strategy firm Kool Topp & Guy with conservative Ken Boessenkool (former advisor to Stephen Harper and Christy Clark) and liberal Don Guy. Topp left the firm to work as Alberta Premier Rachel Notley's Chief of Staff, and was replaced by longtime NDP activist Jamey Heath.

Topp served as executive director of ACTRA Toronto (the Alliance of Canadian Cinema, Television and Radio Artists) until leaving to manage the 2013 provincial NDP election campaign in British Columbia. He is also a member of the board of directors for Pinewood Toronto Studios, chair of the board for the Creative Arts Savings and Credit Union, a co-chair of FilmOntario, and a member of the board of directors for ROI Fund.

Topp is the author of How We Almost Gave the Tories the Boot: The Inside Story Behind the Coalition, a memoir about his experiences attempting to broker a coalition between the NDP and the Liberals to take down PM Stephen Harper's Conservative government. The book details the negotiations that he engaged in with Stéphane Dion, Michael Ignatieff, Jack Layton, Dawn Black, Ed Broadbent, Jean Chrétien, Roy Romanow and Allan Blakeney. The book was nominated by Samara and the Writers' Trust of Canada as one of the "Best Canadian Political Books of the Last 25 Years."

Topp also writes a column for The Globe and Mail.

=== Alberta (2015–2016) ===
Topp ran the campaign war room for the Alberta New Democratic Party during the 2015 election which propelled the Alberta NDP from only 4 seats in the legislature to a majority of 53 seats, ending 44 years of Progressive Conservative rule and allowing the NDP to form its first ever government in the province's history. Topp was in charge of messaging and communications. He joined the campaign in January. Topp drafted speeches, wrote articles countering Tory claims, and approved campaign events. He also subbed for Jim Prentice during practice for the leader's debate. Following the election win, he became the chair of Rachel Notley's transition team into government, working alongside other prominent NDP figures such as Anne McGrath. He also served as Notley's chief of staff in the new government.

Topp resigned as chief of staff on December 14, 2016 to take up a Toronto-based fellowship with Public Policy Forum.
