= Mike Ward (comedian) =

Canadian comedian (born 1973)

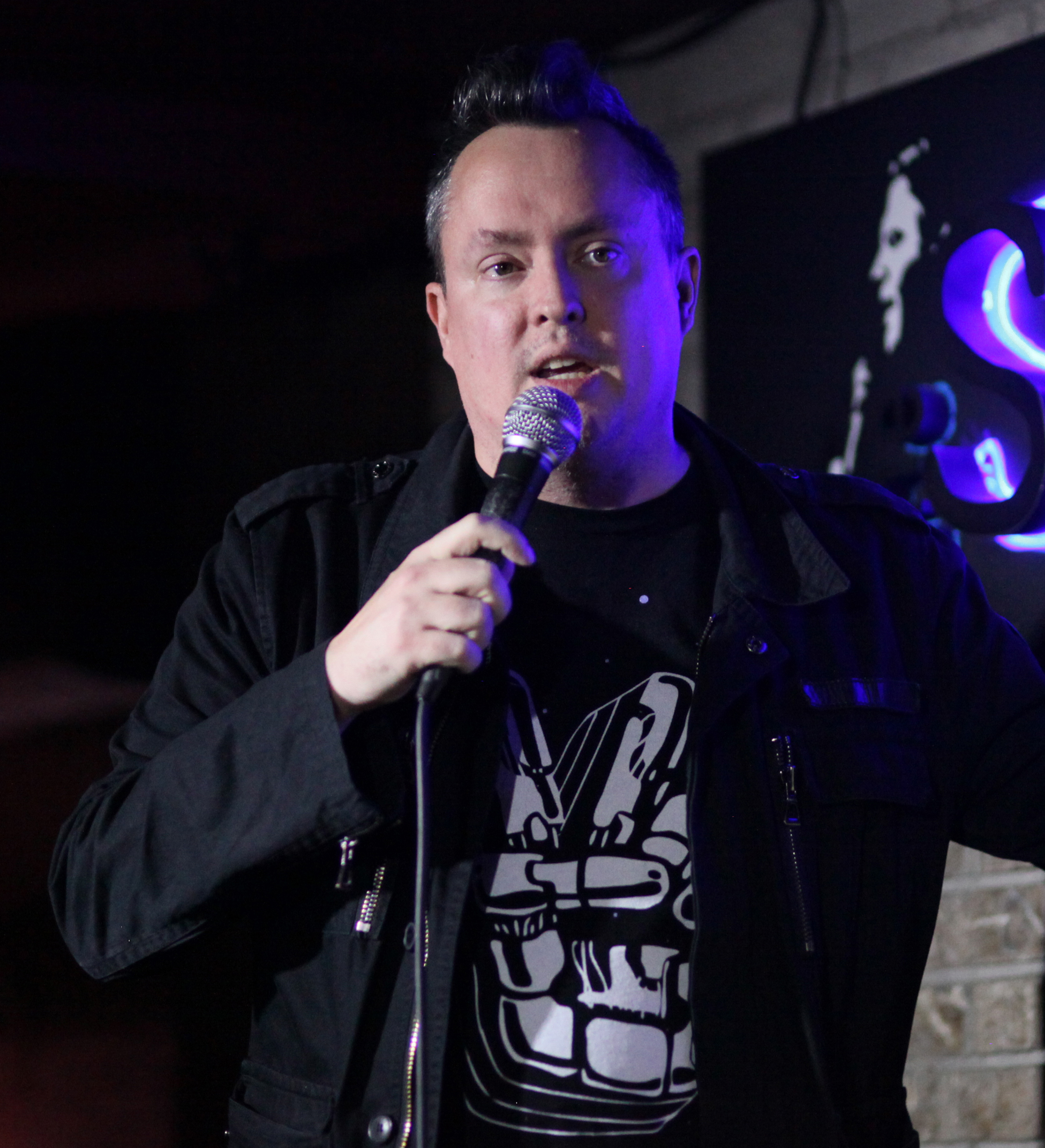
- Ward in September 2016 at The Stand in New York City
- Born: Michael John Ward; September 14, 1973 (age 53); Loretteville, Quebec City, Quebec, Canada
- Notable work: Chabot on L'Gros Show; Henri on CNM (Simon & Henri); Ludger (cotton ouaté avec un loup) on Testostérone Participant on the show Chabada

Comedy career
- Medium: television, stand-up, radio, podcast & documentary
- Genre: Black comedy
- Website: https://mikeward.ca

Michael John Ward (born September 14, 1973) is a Canadian comedian. He performs comedy in both French and English.

== Career ==
Ward has appeared on television doing stand-up in 20 countries; airing throughout Europe, Africa, Australia and North America. He has been a frequent guest of the Anthony Cumia Show podcast. Ward hosts two podcasts: 2 Drink Minimum with comedian Pantelis on Compound Media and Mike Ward sous écoute.

== Controversies ==
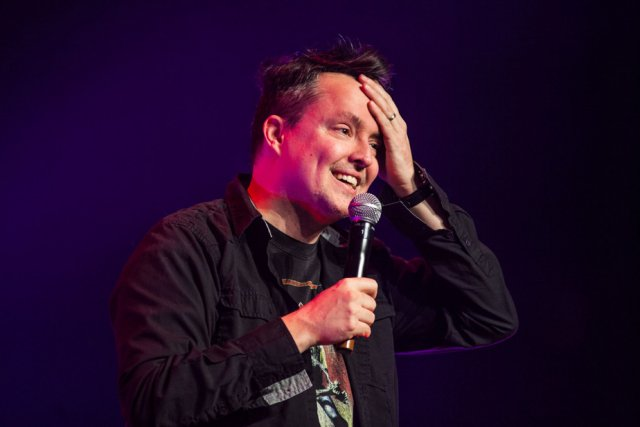
Ward in May 2014

Ward has been the subject of controversy. At Jean-Marc Parent's 2008 Just for Laughs French gala, he made a joke about Revenu Québec, in which he mentioned Cédrika Provencher, a young girl who had been abducted in 2007 in Quebec and whose remains were found in December 2015.

=== Mocking of Jérémy Gabriel ===
Between 2010 and 2013, Ward performed a comedy routine about Jérémy Gabriel, a young disabled singer with Treacher Collins syndrome. Ward mocked Gabriel's appearance, his illness and his abilities as a singer and joked about trying to kill him by drowning him. Gabriel said he was repeatedly bullied at school and became suicidal.

Gabriel's parents filed a complaint with the Quebec human rights commission, and the commission brought the case in front of Quebec's Human Rights Tribunal seeking $80,000 in damages from Ward. On July 20, 2016, he was ordered to pay $42,000 ($35,000 to Jérémy, $7,000 to his mother). Ward's lawyer, Julius Grey, appealed the decision, and the decision was upheld by appellate court judges on November 28, 2019, but dropped the fee initially ordered to be paid to the mother.

In February 2021, Ward appealed the damages award to the Supreme Court of Canada. On October 29, 2021, the Supreme Court overturned, in a 5–4 split, the lower court's decision, citing "The question is whether a reasonable person, informed of the relevant circumstances and context, would consider that the remarks about Mr. Gabriel incite contempt for him or his humanity on a prohibited ground of discrimination. The next question is whether such a reasonable person would consider that, in context, the words could reasonably be expected to lead to the discriminatory treatment of Mr. Gabriel. In our view, the remarks made by Mr. Ward do not meet either of these requirements."

== Filmography ==
=== Television ===
- 2002: Testostérone
- 2004: Le Mike Ward Show
- 2005-2006: L'Gros Show
- 2015: Nasty Show
- 2016: Mike Ward Show

=== DVDs and Digital Release ===
- 2004: Les meilleurs moments.Testostérone. Spécial Mike Ward
- 2006: L'Gros show 1
- 2009: Haïssable
- 2013: Mike Ward s'eXpose
- 2018: Mike Ward au Bordel
- 2018: Infamous
- 2023: Noir
- 2026: Modeste

=== Albums ===
- 2001: Vulgaire
- 2016: Pedophile Jokes & Death Threats
- 2018: Infamous

=== Radio and Podcasts ===
- 1996-1998 Les grandes gueules (writer)
- 2001- 2002: Les Mecs Comiques
- 2004 - 2005: Les grandes gueules
- 2007-2009: Midi Morency
- 2011-: Mike Ward sous écoute
- 2018-: 2 Drink Minimum

=== Film ===
- 2016: The Comedian's Guide to Survival: himself

== Awards ==
- 2002 Nez d’or: Découverte (Quebec City Comedy Festival Award for Best Newcomer)
- 2002 Victor: Révélation (Just For Laughs Award for Breakout Star of the Festival
- 2005 Olivier: Meilleure performance scénique (Best Comedy Performance)
- 2006 Gémeaux: Meilleure performance humour (Gemini Award for Best Comedy Performance)
- 2012 Victor: Numéro de l’année (Just For Laughs Award for Best Set of the Fest)”
- 2015 Antoine: Humanitarian Award
- 2016 Olivier: Série web (Best Web Series)
- 2016 Olivier: Olivier de l’année (Comedian of the Year)
- 2016 Canadian Comedy Award: Comedic Artist of the Year
- 2017 Olivier: Meilleur podcast (Best Podcast)
- 2018 Olivier: Meilleur podcast (Best Podcast)
- 2019 Olivier: Olivier de l’année (Comedian of the Year)
- 2019 Olivier: Spectacle de l’année (Best Show of the Year)
- 2019 Olivier: Auteur de l’année - Spectacle (Best Writing - Stage Show)
- 2019 Olivier: Meilleur podcast (Best Podcast)
