= L'Gros Show =

- Starring: Mike Ward; Martin Perizzolo
- Country of origin: Canada
- Original language: French
- No. of episodes: 16

Production
- Running time: 30 mins

Original release
- Network: Musique Plus
- Release: 2005 – 2006

L'Gros Show is a Canadian situation comedy/mockumentary television series which is broadcast on the Canadian French language music television station Musique Plus.

The show stars Mike Ward as Chabot, a comedy character he had previously developed in 2000, and Martin Perizzolo as his friend Poudy Poudrier. Chabot and Poudy are very much stuck in the 1980s, an obsession which is evidenced by their hairstyles and clothes. Both live in Poudy's mother's basement, where they spend their time playing air guitar and drinking.

Part of the show is shot in black-and-white in a mock documentary style.
