= Jérémy Gabriel =

French Canadian singer

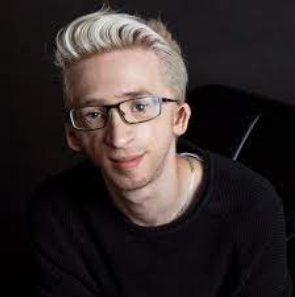

Background information
- Born: December 10, 1996 (age 29); Charlesbourg, Quebec City, Canada
- Occupation: Singer

Jérémy Gabriel (born December 10, 1996), also known as Le Petit Jérémy (English : Little Jérémy), is a French Canadian singer.

== Biography ==
Gabriel was born in Charlesbourg, Quebec City. At birth he was deaf, and had head, facial, ear and skull deformities. At age 6 months he was diagnosed with Treacher Collins syndrome. At age 5 years he was referred to Shriners Hospitals for Children where he met with Dr. Lucie Lessard. At age 6 (2003) he received a bone anchored hearing aid and discovered his passion for singing. In 2006 he sang for the Pope. In 2011, he sang the Canadian National Anthem, "O Canada", for a Montreal Canadiens NHL game.

After performing before pope Benedict XVI in 2006, he was received by Cardinal Ouellet and awarded the decoration of the Pontifical Swiss Guard. He performed several songs at CanadaFest between the years of 2007, 2011 and 2012 CanadaFest.

During 2012–2013, Gabriel became one of the co-patients ambassadors of the Shriners Hospitals for Children. He performed for several congresses and Shrine events across North America. He sang in Toronto, London, Montreal, Calgary, Ottawa, Chatham-Kent, Regina, Atlanta, Lewiston, Charlotte, Tampa Bay, Dallas, Chicago, Los Angeles and Las Vegas.

Gabriel's parents filed a complaint with the Quebec human rights commission against Mike Ward for jokes Ward performed in regards to Gabriel's handicap and singing, in his shows from 2010 to 2013. The commission brought the case in front of Quebec's Human Rights Tribunal seeking $80,000 in damages from Ward. The tribunal ordered Ward to pay him $35,000 and his mother $7000 in July 2016. Ward's attorney, Julius Grey, appealed the decision. The decision was upheld by appellate court judges on November 28, 2019. Ward appealed the decision to the Supreme Court of Canada, which on October 29, 2021, ruled that Ward had not discriminated against Gabriel, and overturned the tribunal's decision.

On February 1, 2022, Gabriel and his mother sued Mike Ward for libel, asking for over $300,000 in damages.

On September 30, 2016, Gabriel released his first single, 'I Don't Care', on JLMMUSIC. That release is distributed by DEP and Believe Digital, and supported by Universal Music Canada. An extended play is scheduled for 2017.
