= Genocide Prevention Group (Canada) =

Informal group of national legislators

The All-Party Parliamentary Group for the Prevention of Genocide and other Crimes Against Humanity (the Genocide Prevention Group) is an informal group of Parliamentarians composed of members from all parties in the House of Commons of Canada and the Senate of Canada with an interest in the prevention of genocide and similar crimes against humanity.

== Origins ==
The group was founded in 2006 by a group of parliamentarians with Senator Roméo Dallaire as its founder. It was inspired by the success of a similar parliamentary group in the United Kingdom and grew out of the Save Darfur Coalition initiated in 2006.

== Mandate ==
The mandate of the Genocide Prevention Group is to:

1. Ensure that the government of Canada galvanizes to prevent and protect civilian populations from genocide, crimes against humanity, and the incitement to such crimes in accordance with the principles of "The Responsibility to Protect (R2P)"
2. Increase the flow of information and analysis to parliamentarians about genocide and other crimes against humanity;
3. Promote understanding of the importance of long-term approaches to genocide prevention; and
4. Engage in communication and collaboration with like-minded bodies in civil society and other Parliaments in order to:

- Exchange information about strategies for the prevention of genocide and other crimes against humanity;
- Work in conjunction with the United Nations Special Advisor for the Prevention of Genocide, the International Criminal Court, and other organizations working in the field of Genocide prevention and post conflict justice; and
- create international channels for the timely exchange of information regarding emerging crises that have a potentially genocidal component.

== Members ==
Membership in the Genocide Prevention Group is open to all Parliamentarians. There are currently about twenty official members of the Genocide Prevention Group, with some sixty parliamentarians who participate in events hosted by the Genocide Prevention Group.

== Executive ==
The Executive is composed of a Chair, three Vice-Chairs, one from each of the parties represented at Parliament, and an ex officio member. The Group is currently chaired by Member of Parliament Ali Ehsassi and the vice-chairs are as follows: Garnett Genuis, MP (Conservative); Ruby Sahota, MP (Liberal); and Cheryl Hardcastle, MP (NDP). The former chair and ex officio member is Lt.-Gen Roméo Dallaire, Senator.

== Current areas of concern ==
The Genocide Prevention Group is currently monitoring a range of ongoing and developing situations, as well as emerging fields in genocide prevention and mass atrocity monitoring. The group has recently been involved with the W2I Project run by the Montreal Institute for Genocide and Human Rights Studies.

== Funding ==
Due to the unofficial nature of the Genocide Prevention Group, the group does not receive Parliamentary funding. It is funded by the Montreal Institute for Genocide and Human Rights Studies and the Genocide Prevention Group's membership fees. .
