= Alexandre Taillefer =

Canadian entrepreneur from Quebec

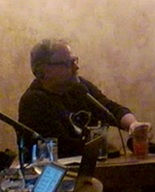
- Alexandre Taillefer on TV show La soirée est encore jeune.
- Occupation: Entrepreneur

Alexandre Taillefer is a Canadian entrepreneur from Quebec. He is the founder and managing partner of XPND Capital, a private equity firm.

== Commercial activities ==
In 1993, at age 21, Tallifer founded Intellia, an e-commerce service provider later bought by Quebecor. He worked at Quebecor for five years (until 2000), where he led the online division. He completed a number of mergers, including the merger of Informission with Intellia to create Nurun, now owned by Publicis.

In 2007, he co-founded Stingray Digital, a provider of musical products and services.

Taillefer is managing partner of XPND Capital, a private equity firm hat manages some 40 million dollars across several venture capital funds. While the firm initially partnered with Stephen Bronfman and his private equity firm Claridge, all of the capital in latter funds has come from the Quebec government. Taillefer was criticized for sub-par returns in funds which consist solely of public money. In 2015, the firm acquired Voir, a major Quebec publisher. Also in 2015, the firm created Taxelco, a holding company which controls over 40% of the taxi market in Montreal, through controlling investments in Téo Taxi, Taxi Diamond, and Taxi Hochelaga.

== Other activities ==
In 2012, Taillefer became chairman of the board of the Musée d'art contemporain de Montréal.

From 2013 to 2016, he was a "dragon" on the TV show Dans l'œil du dragon, the Quebec version of Dragon's Den.

Taillefer has, from time to time, voiced his political positions. In 2015, he voiced his support for a $15 minimum wage. In May 2017, he encouraged the Quebec government to invest in subsidized childcare.

== Personal life ==
In 2015, Taillefer's fourteen year old son committed suicide by gunshot at home. He had struggled with cyberdependency and has sent distress messages in the Twitch chat of his idol Sodapoppin. Throughout 2017, Taillefer publicly denounced Twitch's lack of action in a series of media appearances as well as in a 45-minute documentary entitled "Bye", after his son's final message. Twitch's inaction in these types of situation was further criticized by psychologists and other streamers such as Stéphanie Harvey.

== Political career ==
Alexandre Taillefer served as the campaign chair for the Quebec Liberal Party in the 2018 Quebec general election. He did not run for a seat in the National Assembly. His position as campaign chair for the party in power and as a major shareholder of Quebec media companies generated concerns regarding his potential use of the media to promote the Liberal Party. Similar concerns resulted from the election of Pierre Karl Péladeau as Parti Québecois leader. In an effort to respond to these concerns, Taillefer transitioned out of his managerial responsibilities.

L'actualité, a Quebec media outlet announced on May 10, 2018, that Taillefer had been a registered lobbyist to seek subsidies for his taxi companies.
