= Northern Territories Federation of Labour =

Part of the Canadian Labour Congress

NTFL
- Northern Territories Federation of Labour
- Founded: May 17, 1980; 46 years ago
- Headquarters: Yellowknife
- Location: Canada
- Members: 9,000
- Key people: Sara-Jayne Dempster, President
- Affiliations: CLC
- Website: ntfl.ca

The Northern Territories Federation of Labour (NTFL), affiliated to the Canadian Labour Congress, represents workers in the Northwest Territories and Nunavut. The federation was founded in 1980 and represents 9,000 workers in 17 affiliated trade unions.

== Affiliates ==
- Canadian Employment & Immigration Union
- Canadian Union of Postal Workers (CUPW)
- Government Services Union
- International Association of Machinists and Aerospace Workers
- International Brotherhood of Electrical Workers
- Natural Resources Union
- Public Service Alliance of Canada – Union of Northern Workers (UNW)
- Nunavut Employees Union (NEU)
- Seafarers International of Canada
- United Steelworkers
- Union of Canadian Transportation Employees
- Union of Environment Workers
- Union of National Defense Employees
- Union of Solicitor General Employees
