= Julius Grey =

Canadian lawyer and academic

- Born: January 11, 1948 (age 78); Wrocław, Poland
- Education: McGill University
- Occupations: Lawyer, university professor
- Spouse: Lynne Casgrain

Julius H. Grey (born January 11, 1948) is a Canadian lawyer and university professor. He is particularly known for his expertise in constitutional and human rights law. He is a senior partner at the law firm Grey Casgrain, s.e.n.c.

Born in Wrocław, Poland, he received a Bachelor of Arts degree in 1971, a Bachelor of Civil Law degree in 1971, and a Master of Arts degree in 1973 from McGill University. Grey has been a member of the Quebec Bar and the Canadian Bar Association since 1974. Since 1976 he has been involved in numerous associations such as the Canadian Foundation for Individual Rights, serving as its president from 1985 to 1988. He was a professor of law at McGill University from 1977 until 2002. Mr. Grey was awarded the Médaille du Barreau du Québec, which is the highest distinction a member can receive.

In 1982, Grey defended two Montreal writers, Henry Srebrnik and Shloime Perel, who had published an article, "Signs of the Times," in the January 22 issue of the Jerusalem Post, which summarized the anxiety then being experienced by the Montreal Jewish community following the election in November 1976 of the Parti Québécois. On February 17, the newspaper Le Devoir attacked the Post article, under the sensationalist headline "La diaspora de Montréal est menacée par l’anti-sémitisme." A day later an editorial, "Le Québec discrédité en Israël," appeared in the paper. Grey filed a suit in Quebec Superior Court, charging that the authors had been the victims of a hate campaign. Le Devoir finally settled out of court and printed an apology on its op-ed page on December 17, 1985.

Grey assisted in annulling a stipulation in the Charte de la langue française (Bill 101) that forbade the application of different languages on business signboards. Presently, French must merely be the predominant language, but others are allowed.

Grey supported La servante écarlate by Margaret Atwood, the French translation of The Handmaid's Tale, in the French version of Canada Reads, broadcast on Radio-Canada in 2004.

Grey defended the periodical La Presse Chinoise against a defamation lawsuit filed by members of Falun Gong. In 2005, the Superior Court of Quebec ruled that the articles published by the newspaper did not qualify as defamation. A subsequent ruling by the Quebec Court of Appeal in June 2008 upheld the verdict, on the basis that any defamation was of the Falun Gong leadership and organisation, and not something for which any individual members of the Falun Gong could claim damages.

In 2006, Grey also represented the plaintiff in Multani v. Commission scolaire Marguerite-Bourgeoys, when the landmark case on religious discrimination and administrative law reached the Supreme Court of Canada.

Grey has publicly supported the New Democratic Party and Québec Solidaire, despite being a federalist. He was rumoured to be a future star candidate for the NDP in Montreal, following that party's successful capture of Outremont in a by-election by Thomas Mulcair on September 17, 2007; however, he did not run in the 2008 or 2011 general elections. Although he considered running in the 2015 Canadian federal election, he did not.

On 13 February 2026 as lawyer for candidate Nathalie Sinclair-Desgagné, he became the first lawyer since 1942 to persuade the Supreme Court of Canada to cancel an election result because of irregularities.

Also in 2026, Grey endorsed Avi Lewis in that year's federal NDP leadership race.

Grey is married to Lynne Casgrain, ombudsman of the McGill University Health Centre and daughter of former Québec cabinet minister Claire Kirkland-Casgrain.
