= George Weaver (politician) =

Canadian politician

Member of Parliament for Churchill
- In office June 1949 – June 1957
- Preceded by: Ronald Moore
- Succeeded by: Robert Simpson

Personal details
- Born: George Dyer Weaver; September 16, 1908 Prince Albert, Saskatchewan, Canada
- Died: May 7, 1986 (aged 77)
- Party: Liberal
- Spouse: Mary Scoretz (m. 1938)
- Profession: Politician; engineer

George Dyer Weaver (September 16, 1908 - May 7, 1986) was a Canadian politician Liberal Member of Parliament (MP) who represented the riding of Churchill. Born in Prince Albert, Saskatchewan, Canada, he was a metallurgical engineer by career.

Weaver was born in Prince Albert, Saskatchewan. He trained for his engineering career at the Royal Military College of Canada, then served in South Africa's army between 1942 and 1944. From there, he joined the Royal Canadian Corps of Signals until October 1945, serving as a lieutenant.

He was first elected to Parliament at the Churchill riding in the 1949 general election after an unsuccessful campaign there in 1945. Weaver was re-elected for successive terms in 1949 and 1953 then defeated in the 1957 election by Robert Simpson of the Progressive Conservative party.

Weaver died on 7 May 1986 and is buried in Melfort, Saskatchewan at Mount Pleasant Cemetery.

== Electoral history ==
1957 Canadian federal election: Churchill
Party	Candidate	Votes	%	±%
Progressive Conservative	Robert Simpson	6,191	38.8	+20.8
Liberal	George Dyer Weaver	4,993	31.3	-9.1
Social Credit	Bruce Moore	2,891	18.1	-2.1
Co-operative Commonwealth	Gerald Robert Clarkson	1,870	11.7	-6.9
Total valid votes		15,945	100.0	

1953 Canadian federal election: Churchill
Party	Candidate	Votes	%	±%
Liberal	George Dyer Weaver	4,984	40.4	-5.2
Progressive Conservative	William George Thompson	2,567	20.8	-3.0
Social Credit	Delbert Leroy Downs	2,490	20.2	
Co-operative Commonwealth	Ronald Stewart Moore	2,293	18.6	-12.0
Total valid votes		12,334	100.0	

1949 Canadian federal election: Churchill
Party	Candidate	Votes	%	±%
Liberal	George Dyer Weaver	6,847	45.6	+13.2
Co-operative Commonwealth	Ronald Stewart Moore	4,595	30.6	-8.2
Progressive Conservative	Robert Franklin Milton	3,570	23.8	-5.1
Total valid votes		15,012	100.0	

1945 Canadian federal election: Churchill
Party	Candidate	Votes	%	±%
Co-operative Commonwealth	Ronald Moore	5,226	38.8	
Liberal	George Dyer Weaver	4,359	32.4	-30.1
Progressive Conservative	Cecil Ruddock Neely	3,884	28.8	-8.7
Total valid votes		13,469	100.0	

Note: Progressive Conservative vote is compared to "National Government" vote in 1940 election.
