= Joseph Jeannotte =

Canadian politician

Joseph Ernest Jeannotte (December 25, 1902 in St. Boniface, Manitoba – November 16, 1988) was a politician in Manitoba, Canada. He was a Progressive Conservative member of the Legislative Assembly of Manitoba from 1958 to 1969.

The son of Aime Jeannotte and Delia Cote, Jeannotte was educated in Saskatchewan, and worked as a rancher before entering political life. In 1941, he married Annette Burelle. They raised three daughters, Janet, Dolores, and Irene, in Meadow Portage, Manitoba.

Joseph befriended novelist Gabrielle Roy during her sojourn near his home and was depicted in the novel Where Nests the Waterhen as Monsieur Bessette.

He was first elected to the Manitoba legislature in the 1958 provincial election, defeating Liberal-Progressive incumbent Roy Brown, 2342 votes to 511 in the vast northern constituency of Rupertsland. Prior to the election, Jeannotte had visited Roblin's office in Winnipeg to announce his readiness to be a candidate for the region. Roblin later referred to him as "a wiry little frontiersman". The lopsided nature of Jeannotte's victory may be explained, in part, by the fact that Rupertsland voted several weeks after the rest of the province in the years prior to 1969, due to logistical difficulties in setting up polls in remote communities. Voters knew that the Progressive Conservatives had formed a minority government after the election, and many may have chosen to vote for a candidate on the government side.

Jeannotte was re-elected by equally strong margins in the elections of 1959 and 1962. He faced the most difficult challenge of his career in the 1966 election, but still defeated Liberal Jean René Allard by a significant margin. He frequently traveled the entire riding by himself, driving a plane between remote locations. He was never appointed to cabinet, and did not run for re-election in 1969.

Jeannotte died in Winnipegosis at the age of 85.
