= Twenty Million Questions =

- Genre: Public affairs
- Presented by: Donald Gordon; Charles Lynch
- Country of origin: Canada
- Original language: English
- No. of seasons: 3

Production
- Producer: Cameron Graham
- Production location: Ottawa

Original release
- Network: CBC Television
- Release: 6 October 1966 – 24 June 1969

Twenty Million Questions is a Canadian public affairs television program that aired on CBC Television from 1966 to 1969.

== Premise ==
This weekly half-hour program featured documentary and interview footage regarding topics of national concern. Its hosts were Carleton University political science professor Donald Gordon and journalist Charles Lynch. Episode directors included Ed Reid and Moses Znaimer. Bernard Ostry served as Production Supervisor.

== Scheduling ==
=== Season 1 – 1966-67 ===
Episodes were broadcast on Thursdays at 10 p.m., from 6 October 1966 to 30 March 1967.

- 6 October 1966 - the debut episode concerned the political realm
- 13 October 1966 - a report on the Liberal Party's gathering in Ottawa, including an interview with Lester B. Pearson
- 20 October 1966 - an interview with Quebec Premier Daniel Johnson, Sr.
- 2 February 1967 - "Take Sweden for Instance", a documentary profile of that nation including its economic situation, international relations and labour movement
- 30 March 1967 - "The Young Contenders", profiles of young Canadian politicians Jean Chrétien, David MacDonald, Charles Taylor and John Turner

=== Season 2 – 1967-68 ===
Episodes were broadcast on Wednesdays at 9 p.m. for the second season from 13 September 1967 to 26 June 1968.

- 20 September 1967 - Eric Kierans is guest interviewer of John James Deutsch of Queen's University
- 27 September 1967 - Claude Ryan joins Charles Lynch to interview Lester B. Pearson.
- 26 June 1968 - recap of the previous day's national election

=== Season 3 - 1968-69 ===
This final season of episodes was broadcast on Tuesdays at 10:30 p.m. for its final season from 17 September 1968 to 24 June 1969.

- 24 June 1969 - in this final episode, Charles Lynch interviews Pierre Trudeau at his Prime Minister's residence
