= Rodney Murphy =

Canadian politician

Member of Parliament for Churchill
- In office 22 May 1979 – 25 October 1993
- Preceded by: Cecil Smith
- Succeeded by: Elijah Harper

Personal details
- Born: 16 October 1946 (age 79) Winnipeg, Manitoba, Canada
- Party: New Democratic Party
- Profession: Politician; teacher

Rodney Edward "Rod" Murphy (born 16 October 1946) was a New Democratic Party Member of Parliament (MP) for the riding of Churchill. Murphy was first elected in the 1979 federal election. He was re-elected in the 1980, 1984 and 1988 federal elections, therefore serving in the 31st, 32nd, 33rd and 34th Canadian Parliaments.

Murphy left federal politics after his defeat in the 1993 federal election to Elijah Harper of the Liberal Party.

He was the manager of Niki Ashton's successful campaign to become MP for Churchill in 2008. In 2026, Murphy endorsed Avi Lewis in that year's federal NDP leadership race.

== Electoral history ==
1993 Canadian federal election: Churchill
Party	Candidate	Votes	%	±%
Liberal	Elijah Harper	9,658	40.7	+17.7
New Democratic	Rod Murphy	8,751	36.9	-19.5
Progressive Conservative	Don Knight	2,438	10.3	-10.3
Reform	Wally Daudrich	2,275	9.6	
National	Charles Settee	590	2.5	–
Total valid votes		23,712	100.0	

1988 Canadian federal election: Churchill
Party	Candidate	Votes	%	±%
New Democratic	Rod Murphy	14,168	56.4	+10.8
Liberal	Rodney Spence	5,800	23.1	+5.1
Progressive Conservative	Nazir Ahmad	5,164	20.5	-13.2
Total valid votes		25,132	100.0	

1984 Canadian federal election: Churchill
Party	Candidate	Votes	%	±%
New Democratic	Rod Murphy	10,829	45.6	+2.3
Progressive Conservative	Harvey Hanson	8,010	33.7	+8.2
Liberal	Jack Kennedy	4,272	18.0	-11.8
Independent	Andrew Kirkness	377	1.6	–
Libertarian	Ketih B.P. Muirhead	281	1.2	
Total valid votes		23,769	100.0	

1980 Canadian federal election: Churchill
Party	Candidate	Votes	%	±%
New Democratic	Rod Murphy	10,319	43.3	-8.4
Liberal	Alan Ross	7,092	29.7	+13.5
Progressive Conservative	Cec Smith	6,084	25.5	-6.6
Rhinoceros	Roland Campbell	352	1.5	
Total valid votes		23,847	100.0	
lop.parl.ca

1979 Canadian federal election: Churchill
Party	Candidate	Votes	%	±%
New Democratic	Rod Murphy	12,544	51.7	+21.0
Progressive Conservative	Cecil Smith	7,802	32.1	-8.8
Liberal	Andrew Kirkness	3,936	16.2	-10.1
Total valid votes		24,282	100.0	

Political offices
Preceded by Vic Althouse	Whip of the New Democratic Party; 5 September 1986 – 21 January 1990	Succeeded by Iain Angus
Parliament of Canada
Preceded by Cecil Smith	Member of Parliament for Churchill; 22 May 1979 – 25 October 1993	Succeeded by Elijah Harper
