= Oddur Olafson =

Canadian politician

Oddur Olafson (February 25, 1888 – December 16, 1972) was a politician in Manitoba, Canada. He served in the Legislative Assembly of Manitoba from 1941 to 1945 as a Liberal Independent.

Olafson was born to an Icelandic family in Riverton, Manitoba. He was educated in Riverton, and later became president of Olafson Transportation Co. Limited, based in Winnipeg. He was also a member of the Lisgar Masonic Lodge No. 2 in Selkirk.

He was elected to the Manitoba legislature in the 1936 provincial election, defeating a candidate of the Conservative Party in the sprawling northern constituency of Rupertsland. As a Liberal Independent, he opposed the 1932 alliance between the Liberal Party and the Progressive Party of Premier John Bracken.

Only one other Liberal Independent was elected, and Olafson sat as an opposition member for the next four years. In 1940, he supported the all-party coalition government created by John Bracken after the start of World War II.

Olafson did not seek re-election in the 1941 campaign. He tried to return to the legislature as a pro-coalition independent in the 1945 election, but lost to Liberal-Progressive Daniel Hamilton by 206 votes.
