= Jean Allard =

Jean Allard may refer to:

- Jean René Allard (1930–2020), politician from Manitoba
- Jean Victor Allard (1913–1996), military chief in Canada
