= Department of Natural Resources (Manitoba) =

Department of Natural Resources and Indigenous Futures
Agency overview
- Jurisdiction: Government of Manitoba
- Minister responsible: Ian Bushie, Minister of Natural Resources and Indigenous Futures
- Deputy Minister responsible: Paul McConnell, Deputy Minister of Natural Resources (2023)
- Website: www.gov.mb.ca/fs/index.html

The Department of Natural Resources and Indigenous Futures is the Manitoba Government agency responsible for natural resources in the province of Manitoba.

== List of ministers of natural resources ==
Minister of Natural Resources and Indigenous Futures
- Incumbent; Ian Bushie since November 13, 2024
- Natural Resources
- Member of: Executive Council of Manitoba
- First holder: Marc-Amable Girard

Name	Party	Took office	Left office
Scott Fielding	Progressive Conservative	January 18, 2022	June 9, 2022
Alan Lagimodiere	Progressive Conservative	June 6, 2022	June 9, 2022
Greg Nesbitt	Progressive Conservative	June 9, 2022	October 18, 2023
Jamie Moses	New Democratic	October 18, 2023	November 13, 2024
Ian Bushie	New Democratic	November 13, 2024	Present

== Related legislation ==
Acts	Note
The Conservation Agreements Act	
The Conservation Officers Act	
The Crown Lands Act	Except section 1 as it relates to agricultural Crown lands, and subsection 7(1) and section 7.1 as they relate to work permits on agricultural Crown lands, and section 7.1 to 7.6 and 7.7
The East Side Traditional Lands Planning and Special Protected Areas Act	
The Endangered Species and Ecosystems Act	
The Fish and Wildlife Enhancement Fund Act	
The Fisheries Act	
The Fishermen's Assistance and Polluter's Liability Act	
The Forest Act	
The Forest Health Protection Act	
The Mines and Minerals Act	
The Mining and Metallurgy Compensation Act	
The Manitoba Natural Resources Transfer Act	
The Natural Resources Agreement Act	
An Act to Ratify a Certain Agreement Between the Government of the Dominion of Canada and the Government of the Province of Manitoba	
The Manitoba Natural Resources Transfer Act Amendment Act	
The Manitoba Natural Resources Transfer Act Amendment Act, 1963	
The Oil and Gas Act	
The Oil and Gas Production Tax Act	
The Peatlands Stewardship Act	
The Polar Bear Protection Act	
The Resources Tourism Operators Act	
The Surface Rights Act	
The Surveys Act	
The Wildfires Act	
The Wildfire Act	except the portion of clause 89(e) that relates to compensation for damage to crops caused by wildlife as it pertains to big game and migratory waterfowl
The Wild Rice Act	
The Manitoba Fishery Regulations, 1987	made under s. 43 of the Fisheries Act (Canada)

== See also ==
- List of Manitoba government departments and agencies
