= Churchill—Keewatinook Aski =

Federal electoral district in Manitoba, Canada

Coordinates: 56°N 97°W

Manitoba electoral district
- Interactive map of riding boundaries from the 2025 federal election

Federal electoral district
- Legislature: House of Commons
MP
Rebecca Chartrand
Liberal
- District created: 1933
- First contested: 1935
- Last contested: 2025
- District webpage: profile, map

Demographics
- Population (2011): 85,148
- Electors (2015): 47,940
- Area (km²): 494,701
- Pop. density (per km²): 0.17
- Census division(s): Division No. 19, Division No. 21, Division No. 22, Division No. 23
- Census subdivision(s): Thompson, The Pas, Norway House, Flin Flon (part), St. Theresa Point, Garden Hill, Peguis, Nelson House, Split Lake, Opaskwayak

Churchill—Keewatinook Aski (formerly Churchill) is a federal electoral district in Manitoba, Canada, that has been represented in the House of Commons of Canada since 1935. It covers the northern four-fifths of Manitoba, a vast wilderness area dotted with small municipalities and First Nations reserves. It was named after the town of Churchill, Manitoba, which resides on Churchill River. It is the fifth-largest riding in all of Canada.

== History ==
The riding was created in 1933 when Nelson riding was abolished. The entire area of Nelson was transferred into the new riding of Churchill.

This riding gained territory from Selkirk—Interlake and was renamed "Churchill—Keewatinook Aski" during the 2012 electoral redistribution. "Keewatinook Aski" (ᑮᐍᑎᓄᕽ ᐊᐢᑭᐩ kîwêtinohk askiy) means Northern region in Cree language.

== Demographics ==
The riding has the highest percentage of First Nations people (61.1%) in Canada, as well as the highest percentage of Cree speakers – both those whose mother tongue (21.6%) is Cree and those that use it as a home language (16.6%).

Panethnic groups in Churchill—Keewatinook Aski (2011−2021)
Panethnic group	2021		2016		2011	
Panethnic group	Pop.	%	Pop.	%	Pop.	%
Indigenous	61,455	76.49%	65,415	76.33%	61,930	73.99%
European (Note: Statistic includes all persons that did not make up part of a visible minority or an indigenous identity.)	15,845	19.72%	17,915	20.91%	20,470	24.46%
South Asian	1,655	2.06%	1,185	1.38%	520	0.62%
African	455	0.57%	455	0.53%	240	0.29%
Southeast Asian (Note: Statistic includes total responses of "Filipino" and "Southeast Asian" under visible minority section on census.)	420	0.52%	310	0.36%	285	0.34%
East Asian (Note: Statistic includes total responses of "Chinese", "Korean", and "Japanese" under visible minority section on census.)	210	0.26%	255	0.3%	95	0.11%
Middle Eastern (Note: Statistic includes total responses of "West Asian" and "Arab" under visible minority section on census.)	120	0.15%	45	0.05%	70	0.08%
Latin American	95	0.12%	70	0.08%	55	0.07%
Other/multiracial (Note: Statistic includes total responses of "Visible minority, n.i.e." and "Multiple visible minorities" under visible minority section on census.)	90	0.11%	55	0.06%	40	0.05%
Total responses	80,340	98.87%	85,695	98.6%	83,700	98.3%
Total population	81,258	100%	86,908	100%	85,148	100%
Notes: Totals greater than 100% due to multiple origin responses. Demographics based on 2012 Canadian federal electoral redistribution riding boundaries.

== Members of Parliament ==
This riding has elected the following members of Parliament:

Parliament	Years	Member	Party
Churchill; Riding created from Nelson
18th	1935–1940	Thomas Crerar	Liberal
19th	1940–1945	Thomas Crerar	Liberal
20th	1945–1949	Ronald Moore	Co-operative Commonwealth
21st	1949–1953	George Weaver	Liberal
22nd	1953–1957	George Weaver	Liberal
23rd	1957–1958	Robert Simpson	Progressive Conservative
24th	1958–1962	Robert Simpson	Progressive Conservative
25th	1962–1963	Robert Simpson	Progressive Conservative
26th	1963–1965	Robert Simpson	Progressive Conservative
27th	1965–1968	Robert Simpson	Progressive Conservative
28th	1968–1972	Robert Simpson	Progressive Conservative
29th	1972–1974	Charles Keith Taylor	Progressive Conservative
30th	1974–1979	Cecil Smith	Progressive Conservative
31st	1979–1980	Rod Murphy	New Democratic
32nd	1980–1984	Rod Murphy	New Democratic
33rd	1984–1988	Rod Murphy	New Democratic
34th	1988–1993	Rod Murphy	New Democratic
35th	1993–1997	Elijah Harper	Liberal
36th	1997–2000	Bev Desjarlais	New Democratic
37th	2000–2004	Bev Desjarlais	New Democratic
38th	2004–2005	Bev Desjarlais	New Democratic
38th	2005–2006	Bev Desjarlais	Independent
39th	2006–2008	Tina Keeper	Liberal
40th	2008–2011	Niki Ashton	New Democratic
41st	2011–2015	Niki Ashton	New Democratic
Churchill—Keewatinook Aski
42nd	2015–2019	Niki Ashton	New Democratic
43rd	2019–2021	Niki Ashton	New Democratic
44th	2021–2025	Niki Ashton	New Democratic
45th	2025–present	Rebecca Chartrand	Liberal

=== Current member of Parliament ===
It's member of Parliament (MP) is Rebecca Chartrand. She is a member of the Liberal Party of Canada.

== Election results ==
View source data.
Graph of election results in Churchill—Keewatinook Aski (minor parties that never got 2% of the vote or didn't run consistently are omitted)

=== Churchill—Keewatinook Aski, 2015–present ===
2025 Canadian federal election
** Preliminary results — Not yet official **
Party	Candidate	Votes	%	±%	Expenditures
Liberal	Rebecca Chartrand	9,422	45.61	+20.43	
New Democratic	Niki Ashton	5,971	28.90	–13.66	
Conservative	Lachlan De Nardi	4,859	23.52	–0.65	
People's	Dylan Young	408	1.97	–3.05	
Total valid votes/expense limit					
Total rejected ballots					
Turnout		20,660	42.95		
Eligible voters		48,104			
Liberal notional gain from New Democratic		Swing		+17.05	
Source: Elections Canada

2021 federal election redistributed results
Party	Vote	%
New Democratic	7,628	42.56
Liberal	4,512	25.18
Conservative	4,331	24.17
People's	899	5.02
Green	552	3.08

2021 Canadian federal election
Party	Candidate	Votes	%	±%	Expenditures
New Democratic	Niki Ashton	7,632	42.6	-7.7	$55,604.26
Liberal	Shirley Robinson	4,514	25.2	+5.3	$52,797.79
Conservative	Charlotte Larocque	4,330	24.2	+0.5	none listed
People's	Dylan Young	899	5.0	+3.8	$0.00
Green	Ralph McLean	552	3.1	-1.7	$0.00
Total valid votes/expense limit		17,927	98.8	–	$122,781.65
Total rejected ballots		210	1.2		
Turnout		18,137	36.6		
Eligible voters		49,579			
New Democratic hold		Swing		-6.5	
Source: Elections Canada

2019 Canadian federal election
Party	Candidate	Votes	%	±%	Expenditures
New Democratic	Niki Ashton	11,919	50.3	+5.26	$62,221.20
Conservative	Cyara Bird	5,616	23.7	+13.38	none listed
Liberal	Judy Klassen	4,714	19.9	-22.1	$59,410.31
Green	Ralph McLean	1,144	4.8	+3.01	none listed
People's	Ken Klyne	294	1.2		$0.00
Total valid votes/expense limit		23,687	100.0		
Total rejected ballots		190			
Turnout		23,877	48.8		
Eligible voters		48,949			
New Democratic hold		Swing		-4.06	
Source: Elections Canada

2015 Canadian federal election
Party	Candidate	Votes	%	±%	Expenditures
New Democratic	Niki Ashton	13,487	45.04	-6.65	$107,253.16
Liberal	Rebecca Chartrand	12,575	42.00	+22.13	$108,676.93
Conservative	Kyle G. Mirecki	3,090	10.32	-15.81	–
Green	August Hastmann	537	1.79	-0.52	–
Libertarian	Zachary Linnick	255	0.85	–	–
Total valid votes/expense limit		29,944	100.00		$233,135.69
Total rejected ballots		252	0.83	–	
Turnout		30,196	61.58	–	
Eligible voters		49,036			
New Democratic hold		Swing		-14.39	
Source: Elections Canada

2011 federal election redistributed results
Party	Vote	%
New Democratic	10,962	51.70
Conservative	5,540	26.13
Liberal	4,212	19.86
Green	491	2.32

=== Churchill, 1935–2015 ===
2011 Canadian federal election
Party	Candidate	Votes	%	±%	Expenditures
New Democratic	Niki Ashton	10,262	51.12	+3.36	–
Conservative	Wally Daudrich	5,256	26.18	+5.68	–
Liberal	Sydney Garrioch	4,087	20.36	-8.38	–
Green	Alberteen Spence	471	2.35	-0.94	–
Total valid votes/expense limit		20,076	100.00		
Total rejected ballots		107	0.53	-0.02	
Turnout		20,183	45.35	+5.20	
Eligible voters		44,509	–	–	

2008 Canadian federal election
Party	Candidate	Votes	%	±%	Expenditures
New Democratic	Niki Ashton	8,734	47.76	+19.35	$79,086
Liberal	Tina Keeper	5,289	28.74	-11.94	–
Conservative	Wally Daudrich	3,773	20.50	+8.95	$45,616
Green	Saara Harvie	606	3.29	+1.69	$28
Total valid votes/expense limit		18,402	100.00		$91,452
Total rejected ballots		102	0.55	+0.19	
Turnout		18,504	40.15	-13.48	
New Democrat gain from Liberal		Swing	+		

2006 Canadian federal election: Churchill
Party	Candidate	Votes	%	Expenditures
Liberal	Tina Keeper	10,157	40.68	$75,179.50
New Democratic	Niki Ashton	7,093	28.41	$70,290.02
Independent	Bev Desjarlais	4,283	17.16	$23,042.68
Conservative	Nazir Ahmad	2,886	11.56	$23,875.20
Green	Jeff Fountain	401	1.61	$2,837.23
Independent	Brad Bodnar	146	0.58	$68.69
Total valid votes		24,966	100.00	
Total rejected ballots		90		
Turnout		25,056	55.70	
Electors on lists		44,982		
Sources: Official Results, Elections Canada and Financial Returns, Elections Canada.

2004 Canadian federal election: Churchill
Party	Candidate	Votes	%	Expenditures
New Democratic	Bev Desjarlais	8,612	43.44	$45,503.18
Liberal	Ron Evans	7,604	38.35	$61,955.23
Conservative	Bill Archer	2,999	15.13	$10,398.38
Green	C. David Nickarz	612	3.09	$646.91
Total valid votes		19,827	100.00	
Total rejected ballots		88		
Turnout		19,915	41.40	
Electors on lists		48,106		
Percentage change figures are factored for redistribution. Conservative Party percentages are contrasted with the combined Canadian Alliance and Progressive Conservative percentages from 2000.
Sources: Official Results, Elections Canada and Financial Returns, Elections Canada.

2000 Canadian federal election: Churchill
Party	Candidate	Votes	%	Expenditures
New Democratic	Bev Desjarlais	10,477	44.94	$41,854.47
Liberal	Elijah Harper	7,514	32.23	$55,871.45
Alliance	Jason Shaw	4,126	17.70	$7,444.04
Progressive Conservative	Doreen Murray	1,198	5.14	$2,722.40
Total valid votes		23,315	100.00	
Total rejected ballots		98		
Turnout		23,413	51.05	
Electors on lists		45,860		
Sources: Official Results, Elections Canada and Financial Returns, Elections Canada.

1997 Canadian federal election: Churchill
Party	Candidate	Votes	%	Expenditures
New Democratic	Bev Desjarlais	9,616	41.17	$45,525
Liberal	Elijah Harper	6,852	29.33	$59,373
Reform	Corky Peterson	4,438	19.00	$11,803
Progressive Conservative	Don Knight	2,452	10.50	$10,729
Total valid votes		23,358	100.00	
Total rejected ballots		158		
Turnout		23,516	50.25	
Electors on lists		46,801		
Sources: Official Results, Elections Canada and Financial Returns, Elections Canada.

1993 Canadian federal election: Churchill
Party	Candidate	Votes	%	±%
Liberal	Elijah Harper	9,658	40.7	+17.7
New Democratic	Rod Murphy	8,751	36.9	-19.5
Progressive Conservative	Don Knight	2,438	10.3	-10.3
Reform	Wally Daudrich	2,275	9.6	
National	Charles Settee	590	2.5	–
Total valid votes		23,712	100.0	

1988 Canadian federal election: Churchill
Party	Candidate	Votes	%	±%
New Democratic	Rod Murphy	14,168	56.4	+10.8
Liberal	Rodney Spence	5,800	23.1	+5.1
Progressive Conservative	Nazir Ahmad	5,164	20.5	-13.2
Total valid votes		25,132	100.0	

1984 Canadian federal election: Churchill
Party	Candidate	Votes	%	±%
New Democratic	Rod Murphy	10,829	45.6	+2.3
Progressive Conservative	Harvey Hanson	8,010	33.7	+8.2
Liberal	Jack Kennedy	4,272	18.0	-11.8
Independent	Andrew Kirkness	377	1.6	–
Libertarian	Ketih B.P. Muirhead	281	1.2	
Total valid votes		23,769	100.0	

1980 Canadian federal election
Party	Candidate	Votes	%	±%
New Democratic	Rod Murphy	10,319	43.3	-8.4
Liberal	Alan Ross	7,092	29.7	+13.5
Progressive Conservative	Cec Smith	6,084	25.5	-6.6
Rhinoceros	Roland Campbell	352	1.5	
Total valid votes		23,847	100.0	
lop.parl.ca

1979 Canadian federal election
Party	Candidate	Votes	%	±%
New Democratic	Rod Murphy	12,544	51.7	+21.0
Progressive Conservative	Cecil Smith	7,802	32.1	-8.8
Liberal	Andrew Kirkness	3,936	16.2	-10.1
Total valid votes		24,282	100.0	

1974 Canadian federal election
Party	Candidate	Votes	%	±%
Progressive Conservative	Cecil Smith	11,225	40.9	+6.4
New Democratic	Dan Reagan	8,415	30.7	-2.4
Liberal	Jean René Allard	7,212	26.3	-4.9
Social Credit	Ed Heinrichs	577	2.1	
Total valid votes		27,429	100.0	

1972 Canadian federal election: Churchill
Party	Candidate	Votes	%	±%
Progressive Conservative	Keith Taylor	9,462	34.6	-7.2
New Democratic	Don Duff	9,059	33.1	+10.4
Liberal	Bruce Dunlop	8,536	31.2	-4.4
Independent	R. Jim Henry	327	1.2	
Total valid votes		27,384	100.0	

1968 Canadian federal election
Party	Candidate	Votes	%	±%
Progressive Conservative	Robert Simpson	9,009	41.8	-9.2
Liberal	Frank Dembinsky	7,673	35.6	+8.6
New Democratic	Brian Koshul	4,888	22.7	+7.0
Total valid votes		21,570	100.0	

1965 Canadian federal election
Party	Candidate	Votes	%	±%
Progressive Conservative	Robert Simpson	10,773	51.0	-2.3
Liberal	F.L. Jobin	5,694	27.0	-6.1
New Democratic	Ken MacMaster	3,306	15.6	+2.0
Social Credit	Curt R. Shielman	1,352	6.4	
Total valid votes		21,125	100.0	

1963 Canadian federal election
Party	Candidate	Votes	%	±%
Progressive Conservative	Robert Simpson	11,707	53.3	+2.0
Liberal	Bruce Dunlop	7,253	33.0	+2.5
New Democratic	Florence Matthews	2,990	13.6	-4.5
Total valid votes		21,950	100.0	

1962 Canadian federal election
Party	Candidate	Votes	%	±%
Progressive Conservative	Robert Simpson	10,943	51.3	-13.4
Liberal	Francis Laurence Jobin	6,511	30.6	+7.2
New Democratic	Florence Matthews	3,858	18.1	+6.2
Total valid votes		21,312	100.0	

Note: NDP vote is compared to CCF vote in 1958 election.

1958 Canadian federal election
Party	Candidate	Votes	%	±%
Progressive Conservative	Robert Simpson	11,506	64.7	+25.9
Liberal	Lorne Paterson Ferg	4,159	23.4	-7.9
Co-operative Commonwealth	Jack Freedman	2,118	11.9	+0.2
Total valid votes		17,783	100.0	

1957 Canadian federal election
Party	Candidate	Votes	%	±%
Progressive Conservative	Robert Simpson	6,191	38.8	+20.8
Liberal	George Dyer Weaver	4,993	31.3	-9.1
Social Credit	Bruce Moore	2,891	18.1	-2.1
Co-operative Commonwealth	Gerald Robert Clarkson	1,870	11.7	-6.9
Total valid votes		15,945	100.0	

1953 Canadian federal election
Party	Candidate	Votes	%	±%
Liberal	George Dyer Weaver	4,984	40.4	-5.2
Progressive Conservative	William George Thompson	2,567	20.8	-3.0
Social Credit	Delbert Leroy Downs	2,490	20.2	
Co-operative Commonwealth	Ronald Stewart Moore	2,293	18.6	-12.0
Total valid votes		12,334	100.0	

1949 Canadian federal election
Party	Candidate	Votes	%	±%
Liberal	George Dyer Weaver	6,847	45.6	+13.2
Co-operative Commonwealth	Ronald Stewart Moore	4,595	30.6	-8.2
Progressive Conservative	Robert Franklin Milton	3,570	23.8	-5.1
Total valid votes		15,012	100.0	

1945 Canadian federal election
Party	Candidate	Votes	%	±%
Co-operative Commonwealth	Ronald Moore	5,226	38.8	
Liberal	George Dyer Weaver	4,359	32.4	-30.1
Progressive Conservative	Cecil Ruddock Neely	3,884	28.8	-8.7
Total valid votes		13,469	100.0	

Note: Progressive Conservative vote is compared to "National Government" vote in 1940 election.

1940 Canadian federal election
Party	Candidate	Votes	%	±%
Liberal	Thomas Crerar	8,276	62.5	+22.5
National Government	Will Blakeman Scarth	4,963	37.5	+3.2
Total valid votes		13,239	100.0	

Note: "National Government" vote is compared to Conservative vote in 1935 election.

1935 Canadian federal election
Party	Candidate	Votes	%
Liberal	Thomas Crerar	3,603	40.0
Conservative	Barney M. Stitt	3,091	34.3
Co-operative Commonwealth	Alexander Stewart	2,313	25.7
Total valid votes		9,007	100.0

== See also ==
- List of Canadian electoral districts
- Historical federal electoral districts of Canada
