= Elijah Harper =

Canadian politician (1949–2013)

Elijah Harper OM
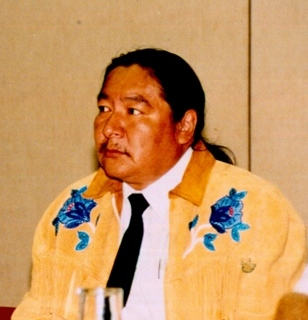
- Elijah Harper with Menno Wiebe, 1990

Member of Parliament for Churchill
- In office October 25, 1993 – June 1, 1997
- Preceded by: Rod Murphy
- Succeeded by: Bev Desjarlais

Manitoba Minister of Northern Affairs
- In office February 4, 1987 – May 9, 1988
- Premier: Howard Pawley
- Preceded by: Harry Harapiak
- Succeeded by: Jim Downey

Manitoba Minister without Portfolio
- In office April 17, 1986 – February 4, 1987
- Premier: Howard Pawley

Member of the Legislative Assembly of Manitoba for Rupertsland
- In office November 17, 1981 – November 30, 1992
- Preceded by: Harvey Bostrom
- Succeeded by: Eric Robinson

Personal details
- Born: March 3, 1949 Red Sucker Lake, Manitoba, Canada
- Died: May 17, 2013 (aged 64) Ottawa, Ontario, Canada
- Party: Manitoba New Democratic Party (1981–1993); Liberal Party of Canada (1993–2013)
- Children: 2
- Education: University of Manitoba

Elijah Harper OM (March 3, 1949 – May 17, 2013) was a Canadian Oji-Cree politician who served as a member of the Legislative Assembly of Manitoba (MLA) from 1981 to 1992 and a member of Parliament (MP) from 1993 to 1997. Harper was elected chief of the Red Sucker Lake Indian Band in 1978, serving for four years and worked as a policy analyst prior to entering politics. He was a key factor in the rejection of the Meech Lake Accord, a proposed amendment of the Canadian constitution.

== Early life and education ==
Harper was born in Red Sucker Lake, a reserve in northern Manitoba. He attended residential schools in Norway House, Brandon and Birtle, Manitoba, then secondary school at Garden Hill and Winnipeg. He studied at the University of Manitoba in 1971 and 1972. He later worked as a community development worker, a supervisor for the Manitoba Indian Brotherhood, and a program analyst for the Manitoba Department of Northern Affairs.

== Political career ==
In 1978, he was elected as the Chief for Red Sucker Lake Band (now Red Sucker Lake First Nation), a position he held for four years.

In 1981, Harper contested and won the sprawling northern Manitoba riding of Rupertsland for the New Democratic Party (NDP) to become the first Treaty Indian to be elected as a provincial politician. He was re-elected in the 1986 Manitoba general election. On April 17, 1986, he was appointed to cabinet as a Minister without Portfolio, responsible for Native Affairs. On February 4, 1987, he was named minister of northern affairs and minister in charge of the Communities Economic Fund Act.

Harper was dropped from the Cabinet on September 9, 1987, after being involved in a car accident while driving under the influence of alcohol. No one was injured in the incident. Harper subsequently pleaded guilty to refusing a breathalyzer test, leaving the scene of an accident and driving while impaired. He was fined $450, and his driver's licence was suspended for a year. Harper acknowledged his mistake, and entered an alcohol-rehabilitation program. He stopped drinking for good, and voluntarily stopped driving for five years. He was reappointed as minister of northern affairs and minister responsible for native affairs, on November 23, 1987, and served in that role until the defeat of Howard Pawley's government in 1988. He was again re-elected at the 1988 Manitoba general election.

=== Role in Meech Lake Accord ===
In 1990, Harper achieved national fame for his refusal to accept the Meech Lake Accord, a constitutional amendment package negotiated to gain Quebec's acceptance of the Constitution Act, 1982. Under the Manitoba legislature's rules of the day, the legislature had to unanimously consent to a motion for emergency debate that would bring the Accord up for vote. Harper was displeased that the Accord had been negotiated in 1987 without the input of Canada's First Nations.

Well I was opposed to the Meech Lake Accord because we weren't included in the Constitution. We were to recognize Quebec as a distinct society, whereas we as Aboriginal people were completely left out. We were the First Peoples here - First Nations of Canada - we were the ones that made treaties with the settlers that came from Europe. These settler people and their governments didn't recognize us as a Nation, as a government and that is why we opposed the Meech Lake Accord.

There were only twelve days before the ratification deadline for the Accord. Each day, the Manitoba government requested unanimous consent in the Assembly to consider the resolution. Each day, Harper, while holding an eagle feather, denied unanimous consent, so the resolution could not be debated. As a result, Newfoundland premier Clyde Wells cancelled a proposed vote on the Accord in the General Assembly of Newfoundland. Since the Meech Lake Accord failed to pass in both Manitoba and Newfoundland, the constitution was not amended. The same year, he won the Stanley Knowles Humanitarian Award, was voted as the "Newsmaker of the Year in Canada" by the Canadian Press, was awarded the title of Honorary Chief for Life by Red Sucker Lake First Nation, and received a commemorative medal of Canada from the governor general for his efforts in public service. Harper also opposed the Charlottetown Accord in 1992.

=== Federal politics ===
Harper resigned from the Manitoba legislature on November 30, 1992 with the intention of running in the federal election due in 1993. He initially wanted to run for the federal New Democratic Party in the northern riding of Churchill. However, the NDP leadership rebuffed him because that riding's NDP incumbent, Rod Murphy, was not willing to stand down in Harper's favour. After considering offers from several parties, Harper agreed to join the Liberal Party in early 1993. He claimed that this change in party affiliation did not reflect a change in his principles; he intended to represent native interests in parliament, party lines notwithstanding. His presence in the Liberal Party was controversial, however; many former allies considered his decision misguided, and some Quebec Liberals did not want to be associated with the man who brought down Meech Lake.

Harper defeated Murphy in the 1993 election. He was a member of the Parliamentary Standing Committee of Aboriginal Affairs. He was defeated by New Democrat Bev Desjarlais in the 1997 election, and again in the 2000 election.

=== Later work ===
Elijah Harper was appointed commissioner of the Indian Claims Commission on January 21, 1999, and remained in demand as a speaker until his death.

== Legacy ==
For his work for his people, Harper received the Stanley Knowles Humanitarian Award in 1991, and a National Aboriginal Achievement Award, now the Indspire Awards, in 1996.

A film based on Harper's life focusing in particular on the month of June 1990, when Harper blocked the Manitoba legislature from voting on the Meech Lake Accord, was directed by Paul Unwin and played in 2007 at the Vancouver International Film Festival. The film, entitled Elijah, was produced for the CTV Television Network. It stars Billy Merasty in the title role.

Harper was applauded for his role in preventing the Meech Lake Accord by Canadian band Blue Rodeo in their song "Fools Like You" which appeared as the first track on their 1992 album Lost Together. The song, which criticizes the Canadian government's treatment of Indigenous peoples, includes the lyrics "God bless Elijah with the feather in his hand / Stop stealing the Indian land."

== Personal life and death ==
Harper had some personal controversy. Creditors as well as his ex-wife sued him for financial claims in 1991.

Harper also had health problems. In the autumn of 1994 he had a mysterious illness doctors and native healers could not explain. On May 17, 2013, he died of heart failure due to complications from diabetes in Ottawa.

"It is always very difficult to go against the wind, and to stand up straight and say no when the easier path is to give in and go in the direction of the wind. I will always remember the image of Elijah Harper's courage and determination and his profound conviction", stated Ghislain Picard, Chief of the Assembly of the First Nations of Quebec and Labrador.

On May 20, 2013, Harper's open casket was draped with the flag of Manitoba as he lay in state at the Manitoba Legislative Building in Winnipeg where hundreds of supporters filed through to pay their respects. A funeral service took place later that day at the Glory and Peace Church in Winnipeg. Harper was buried at Red Sucker Lake First Nation.

== Electoral history ==
1997 Canadian federal election: Churchill
Party	Candidate	Votes	%	Expenditures
New Democratic	Bev Desjarlais	9,616	41.17	$45,525
Liberal	Elijah Harper	6,852	29.33	$59,373
Reform	Corky Peterson	4,438	19.00	$11,803
Progressive Conservative	Don Knight	2,452	10.50	$10,729
Total valid votes		23,358	100.00	
Total rejected ballots		158		
Turnout		23,516	50.25	
Electors on lists		46,801		
Sources: Official Results, Elections Canada and Financial Returns, Elections Canada.

1993 Canadian federal election: Churchill
Party	Candidate	Votes	%	±%
Liberal	Elijah Harper	9,658	40.7	+17.7
New Democratic	Rod Murphy	8,751	36.9	-19.5
Progressive Conservative	Don Knight	2,438	10.3	-10.3
Reform	Wally Daudrich	2,275	9.6	
National	Charles Settee	590	2.5	–
Total valid votes		23,712	100.0	
