= Keewatinook =

Provincial electoral district in Manitoba, Canada

Coordinates: 55.453°N 93.779°W

Manitoba electoral district

Provincial electoral district
- Legislature: Legislative Assembly of Manitoba
MLA
Ian Bushie
New Democratic
- District created: 1915
- First contested: 1915
- Last contested: 2023

Demographics
- Population (2016): 20,815
- Electors (2019): 13,422
- Area (km²): 155,157
- Pop. density (per km²): 0.13

Keewatinook (previously spelt "Kewatinook") is a provincial electoral district in the Canadian province of Manitoba.

The riding existed previously under the name Rupertsland; however, starting with the 2011 general election, the riding was renamed Kewatinook which means 'from the north' in Cree. Effective as of the 2019 election, the spelling was corrected to Keewatinook.

Currently the largest riding in the province, Keewatinook is a sprawling northern constituency occupying a large portion of eastern Manitoba. Its current area stretches from the Ontario border in the southeast to the Nunavut border in the north; it is also bordered by the ridings of Lac Du Bonnet to the south and Flin Flon, The Pas, and Thompson to the west.

As of 2023, Ian Bushie is the MLA for this riding.

== History ==
The division, originally named Rupertsland, was created in 1915 from territories that were added to the province of Manitoba four years earlier and has existed continuously since that time. The area had been part of the Grand Rapids and Churchill and Nelson electoral districts for the 1914 Manitoba general election.

Before 1966, elections in this riding were usually deferred until a later date than the rest of the province, due to the increased time it took to run elections in the region.

The riding was originally smaller than its current size until 1989, when it gained a significant amount of territory from the former riding of Churchill.

As part of the 2008 riding redistribution by the Manitoba Boundaries Commission, its name was changed to Kewatinook (Cree for 'from the north') beginning with the 2011 general election. Effective as of the 2019 election, the spelling was corrected to Keewatinook.

Prior to the 2016 election, the New Democratic Party represented the riding from 1969 to 2016, when Judy Klassen of the Liberal Party defeated longtime MLA Eric Robinson. The NDP would regain control of the seat in 2019, with Ian Bushie defeating Liberal Jason Harper.

== Demographics ==
Keewatinook's population in 2006 was 15,560. In 1999, the average family income was $33,787 (the fourth-lowest in Manitoba), and the unemployment rate was 25%. Over 34% of the riding's population have less than a Grade 9 education, the highest such rate in the province. Government services account for 21% of the riding's industry, followed by education services at 17%.

Eighty-seven per cent of Keewatinook's residents are Indigenous, the highest percentage in the province. Over half of the population list Cree as their mother tongue. In 1999, there was only a 1% immigrant population.

== Members of the Legislative Assembly ==
| Assembly | Years | Member | Party |
|---|---|---|---|
Riding created from Grand Rapids and Churchill and Nelson
| 15th | 1915-1920 | John Morrison | Independent |
| 16th | 1920-1922 | John Morrison | Liberal |
| 17th | 1922-1927 | Francis Black | Progressive |
| 18th | 1927-1932 | Herbert Beresford | Independent Progressive |
| 19th | 1932-1936 | Ewan McPherson | Liberal–Progressive |
| 20th | 1936-1941 | Michael Rojeski | Liberal |
| 21st | 1941-1945 | Daniel Hamilton | Liberal–Progressive |
| 22nd | 1945-1949 | Daniel Hamilton | Liberal–Progressive |
| 23rd | 1949-1953 | Daniel Hamilton | Liberal–Progressive |
| 24th | 1953-1958 | Roy Brown | Liberal–Progressive |
| 25th | 1958-1959 | Joseph Jeannotte | Progressive Conservative |
| 26th | 1959-1963 | Joseph Jeannotte | Progressive Conservative |
| 27th | 1963-1966 | Joseph Jeannotte | Progressive Conservative |
| 28th | 1966-1969 | Joseph Jeannotte | Progressive Conservative |
| 29th | 1969-1972 | Jean Allard | New Democratic |
| 29th | 1972-1973 | Jean Allard | Independent |
| 30th | 1973-1977 | Harvey Bostrom | New Democratic |
| 31st | 1977-1981 | Harvey Bostrom | New Democratic |
| 32nd | 1981-1985 | Elijah Harper | New Democratic |
| 33rd | 1985-1988 | Elijah Harper | New Democratic |
| 34th | 1988-1990 | Elijah Harper | New Democratic |
| 35th | 1990-1992 | Elijah Harper | New Democratic |
| 35th | 1992-1995 | Eric Robinson | New Democratic |
| 36th | 1995-1999 | Eric Robinson | New Democratic |
| 37th | 1999-2003 | Eric Robinson | New Democratic |
| 38th | 2003-2007 | Eric Robinson | New Democratic |
| 39th | 2007-2011 | Eric Robinson | New Democratic |
Keewatinook
| 40th | 2011-2016 | Eric Robinson | New Democratic |
| 41st | 2016–2019 | Judy Klassen | Liberal |
| 42nd | 2019–2023 | Ian Bushie | New Democratic |
| 43rd | 2023–present | Ian Bushie | New Democratic |

== Electoral results ==
=== 1916 by-election ===
Manitoba provincial by-election, 1916: Rupertsland
| Party | Candidate | Votes | % |
|---|---|---|---|
| Liberal | John Morrison | | 0.00 |
| Total valid votes | | | – |
| Rejected | | N/A | – |
| Eligible voters / Turnout | | N/A | – |
Source(s) Source: Manitoba. Chief Electoral Officer (1999). Statement of Votes for the 37th Provincial General Election, September 21, 1999 (PDF) (Report). Winnipeg: Elections Manitoba.

=== 1920 ===
1920 Manitoba general election: Rupertsland
| Party | Candidate | Votes | % | ±% |
|---|---|---|---|---|
| Independent | John Morrison | | 0.00 | – |
| Total valid votes | | | – | – |
| Rejected | | N/A | – | |
| Eligible voters / Turnout | | N/A | – | – |
Source(s) Source: Manitoba. Chief Electoral Officer (1999). Statement of Votes for the 37th Provincial General Election, September 21, 1999 (PDF) (Report). Winnipeg: Elections Manitoba.

=== 1922 ===
1922 Manitoba general election: Rupertsland
| Party | Candidate | Votes | % | ±% |
|---|---|---|---|---|
| Liberal | Francis Black | | 0.00 | – |
| Total valid votes | | | – | – |
| Rejected | | N/A | – | |
| Eligible voters / Turnout | | N/A | – | – |
Source(s) Source: Manitoba. Chief Electoral Officer (1999). Statement of Votes for the 37th Provincial General Election, September 21, 1999 (PDF) (Report). Winnipeg: Elections Manitoba.

=== 1927 ===
1927 Manitoba general election: Rupertsland
| Party | Candidate | Votes | % | ±% |
|---|---|---|---|---|
| Progressive | Herbert Beresford | 235 | 49.37 | – |
| Liberal | Frederick Charles Hamilton | 160 | 33.61 | – |
| Conservative | Hyman Yewdall | 81 | 17.02 | – |
| Total valid votes | | 476 | – | – |
| Rejected | | N/A | – | |
| Eligible voters / Turnout | | 640 | 74.38 | – |
Source(s) Source: Manitoba. Chief Electoral Officer (1999). Statement of Votes for the 37th Provincial General Election, September 21, 1999 (PDF) (Report). Winnipeg: Elections Manitoba.

=== 1932 ===
1932 Manitoba general election: Rupertsland
| Party | Candidate | Votes | % | ±% |
|---|---|---|---|---|
| Liberal–Progressive | Ewan McPherson | 319 | 48.41 | – |
| Liberal–Progressive | Herbert Beresford | 229 | 34.75 | – |
| Independent | Capt. Evan Atkinson | 111 | 16.84 | – |
| Total valid votes | | 659 | – | – |
| Rejected | | N/A | – | |
| Eligible voters / Turnout | | 908 | 72.58 | -1.80 |
Source(s) Source: Manitoba. Chief Electoral Officer (1999). Statement of Votes for the 37th Provincial General Election, September 21, 1999 (PDF) (Report). Winnipeg: Elections Manitoba.

=== 1936 ===
1936 Manitoba general election: Rupertsland
| Party | Candidate | Votes | % | ±% |
|---|---|---|---|---|
| Independent | Oddur Olafson | 686 | 60.49 | – |
| Conservative | William Walker Kennedy | 448 | 39.51 | – |
| Total valid votes | | 1,134 | – | – |
| Rejected | | 17 | – | |
| Eligible voters / Turnout | | 1,885 | 61.06 | -11.52 |
Source(s) Source: Manitoba. Chief Electoral Officer (1999). Statement of Votes for the 37th Provincial General Election, September 21, 1999 (PDF) (Report). Winnipeg: Elections Manitoba.

=== 1941 ===
1941 Manitoba general election: Rupertsland
| Party | Candidate | Votes | % | ±% |
|---|---|---|---|---|
| Liberal–Progressive | Daniel Hamilton | 683 | 69.69 | – |
| Independent | G. L. Van Vliet | 297 | 30.31 | – |
| Total valid votes | | 980 | – | – |
| Rejected | | 20 | – | |
| Eligible voters / Turnout | | 1,537 | 65.06 | 4.00 |
Source(s) Source: Manitoba. Chief Electoral Officer (1999). Statement of Votes for the 37th Provincial General Election, September 21, 1999 (PDF) (Report). Winnipeg: Elections Manitoba.

=== 1945 ===
1945 Manitoba general election: Rupertsland
| Party | Candidate | Votes | % | ±% |
|---|---|---|---|---|
| Liberal–Progressive | Daniel Hamilton | 438 | 48.78 | -20.92 |
| Liberal–Progressive | Oddur Olafson | 230 | 25.61 | -44.08 |
| Liberal–Progressive | Walter Henry Gabriel "Harry" Gibbs | 175 | 19.49 | -50.21 |
| Labor–Progressive | Melvin Reid Burritt | 55 | 6.12 | – |
| Total valid votes | | 898 | – | – |
| Rejected | | 25 | – | |
| Eligible voters / Turnout | | 1,100 | 83.91 | 18.85 |
Source(s) Source: Manitoba. Chief Electoral Officer (1999). Statement of Votes for the 37th Provincial General Election, September 21, 1999 (PDF) (Report). Winnipeg: Elections Manitoba.

=== 1949 ===
1949 Manitoba general election: Rupertsland
| Party | Candidate | Votes | % | ±% |
|---|---|---|---|---|
| Independent | Daniel Hamilton | | 0.00 | – |
| Total valid votes | | | – | – |
| Rejected | | N/A | – | |
| Eligible voters / Turnout | | 1,448 | 0.00 | -83.91 |
Source(s) Source: Manitoba. Chief Electoral Officer (1999). Statement of Votes for the 37th Provincial General Election, September 21, 1999 (PDF) (Report). Winnipeg: Elections Manitoba.

=== 1953 ===
1953 Manitoba general election: Rupertsland
| Party | Candidate | Votes | % | ±% |
|---|---|---|---|---|
| Liberal–Progressive | Roy Brown | 1,138 | 48.95 | – |
| Independent Liberal | Harry Boulette | 1,001 | 43.05 | – |
| Independent | Charles Leo Abbott | 186 | 8.00 | – |
| Total valid votes | | 2,325 | – | – |
| Rejected | | 92 | – | |
| Eligible voters / Turnout | | 4,196 | 57.60 | 57.60 |
Source(s) Source: Manitoba. Chief Electoral Officer (1999). Statement of Votes for the 37th Provincial General Election, September 21, 1999 (PDF) (Report). Winnipeg: Elections Manitoba.

=== 1958 ===
1958 Manitoba general election: Rupertsland
| Party | Candidate | Votes | % | ±% |
|---|---|---|---|---|
| Progressive Conservative | Joseph Jeannotte | 2,342 | 72.80 | – |
| Liberal–Progressive | Roy Brown | 511 | 15.88 | -33.06 |
| Independent | Asta Austmann Oddson | 364 | 11.31 | – |
| Total valid votes | | 3,217 | – | – |
| Rejected | | 23 | – | |
| Eligible voters / Turnout | | 4,697 | 68.98 | 11.38 |
Source(s) Source: Manitoba. Chief Electoral Officer (1999). Statement of Votes for the 37th Provincial General Election, September 21, 1999 (PDF) (Report). Winnipeg: Elections Manitoba.

=== 1959 ===
1959 Manitoba general election: Rupertsland
| Party | Candidate | Votes | % | ±% |
|---|---|---|---|---|
| Progressive Conservative | Joseph Jeannotte | 2,268 | 69.83 | -2.97 |
| Liberal–Progressive | Harry Boulette | 587 | 18.07 | 2.19 |
| Co-operative Commonwealth | Alfred J. Cook | 393 | 12.10 | – |
| Total valid votes | | 3,248 | – | – |
| Rejected | | 28 | – | |
| Eligible voters / Turnout | | 4,870 | 67.27 | -1.71 |
Source(s) Source: Manitoba. Chief Electoral Officer (1999). Statement of Votes for the 37th Provincial General Election, September 21, 1999 (PDF) (Report). Winnipeg: Elections Manitoba.

=== 1962 ===
1962 Manitoba general election: Rupertsland
| Party | Candidate | Votes | % | ±% |
|---|---|---|---|---|
| Progressive Conservative | Joseph Jeannotte | 2,329 | 70.47 | 0.64 |
| Liberal | Reginald McKay | 515 | 15.58 | – |
| New Democratic | Thomas Hamilton | 461 | 13.95 | – |
| Total valid votes | | 3,305 | – | – |
| Rejected | | 45 | – | |
| Eligible voters / Turnout | | 6,653 | 50.35 | -16.92 |
Source(s) Source: Manitoba. Chief Electoral Officer (1999). Statement of Votes for the 37th Provincial General Election, September 21, 1999 (PDF) (Report). Winnipeg: Elections Manitoba.

=== 1966 ===
1966 Manitoba general election: Rupertsland
| Party | Candidate | Votes | % | ±% |
|---|---|---|---|---|
| Progressive Conservative | Joseph Jeannotte | 1,865 | 58.63 | -11.84 |
| Liberal | Jean René Allard | 953 | 29.96 | 14.38 |
| New Democratic | Douglas A. MacLachlan | 363 | 11.41 | -2.54 |
| Total valid votes | | 3,181 | – | – |
| Rejected | | 33 | – | |
| Eligible voters / Turnout | | 5,737 | 56.02 | 5.67 |
Source(s) Source: Manitoba. Chief Electoral Officer (1999). Statement of Votes for the 37th Provincial General Election, September 21, 1999 (PDF) (Report). Winnipeg: Elections Manitoba.

=== 1969 ===
1969 Manitoba general election: Rupertsland
| Party | Candidate | Votes | % | ±% |
|---|---|---|---|---|
| New Democratic | Jean René Allard | 1,366 | 38.65 | 27.24 |
| Liberal | S. P. "Bert" Berthelette | 1,142 | 32.31 | 2.36 |
| Progressive Conservative | Paul Burelle | 1,026 | 29.03 | -29.60 |
| Total valid votes | | 3,534 | – | – |
| Rejected | | 32 | – | |
| Eligible voters / Turnout | | 5,436 | 65.60 | 9.58 |
Source(s) Source: Manitoba. Chief Electoral Officer (1999). Statement of Votes for the 37th Provincial General Election, September 21, 1999 (PDF) (Report). Winnipeg: Elections Manitoba.

=== 1973 ===
1973 Manitoba general election: Rupertsland
| Party | Candidate | Votes | % | ±% |
|---|---|---|---|---|
| New Democratic | Harvey Bostrom | 2,093 | 46.44 | 7.79 |
| Liberal | John Ateah | 1,329 | 29.49 | -2.83 |
| Progressive Conservative | Raymond Guiboche | 504 | 11.18 | -17.85 |
| Independent | David "Dave" Courchene | 415 | 9.21 | – |
| Independent | Lorne Lester | 166 | 3.68 | – |
| Total valid votes | | 4,507 | – | – |
| Rejected | | 52 | – | |
| Eligible voters / Turnout | | 6,296 | 72.41 | 6.81 |
Source(s) Source: Manitoba. Chief Electoral Officer (1999). Statement of Votes for the 37th Provincial General Election, September 21, 1999 (PDF) (Report). Winnipeg: Elections Manitoba.

=== 1977 ===
1977 Manitoba general election: Rupertsland
| Party | Candidate | Votes | % | ±% |
|---|---|---|---|---|
| New Democratic | Harvey Bostrom | 2,141 | 47.50 | 1.07 |
| Progressive Conservative | George R. Weiss | 1,625 | 36.06 | 24.87 |
| Liberal | Norman Gunn | 741 | 16.44 | -13.05 |
| Total valid votes | | 4,507 | – | – |
| Rejected | | 28 | – | |
| Eligible voters / Turnout | | 6,809 | 66.60 | -5.81 |
Source(s) Source: Manitoba. Chief Electoral Officer (1999). Statement of Votes for the 37th Provincial General Election, September 21, 1999 (PDF) (Report). Winnipeg: Elections Manitoba.

=== 1981 ===
1981 Manitoba general election: Rupertsland
| Party | Candidate | Votes | % | ±% |
|---|---|---|---|---|
| New Democratic | Elijah Harper | 3,032 | 69.48 | 21.97 |
| Liberal | Allan Ross | 1,004 | 23.01 | 6.57 |
| Progressive Conservative | Nelson Scribe | 272 | 6.23 | -29.82 |
| Progressive | Frances Thompson | 56 | 1.28 | – |
| Total valid votes | | 4,364 | – | – |
| Rejected | | 76 | – | |
| Eligible voters / Turnout | | 8,271 | 53.68 | -12.92 |
Source(s) Source: Manitoba. Chief Electoral Officer (1999). Statement of Votes for the 37th Provincial General Election, September 21, 1999 (PDF) (Report). Winnipeg: Elections Manitoba.

=== 1986 ===
1986 Manitoba general election: Rupertsland
| Party | Candidate | Votes | % | ±% |
|---|---|---|---|---|
| New Democratic | Elijah Harper | 2,302 | 60.42 | -9.06 |
| Progressive Conservative | Leonard McKay | 931 | 24.44 | 18.20 |
| Liberal | Ed Price | 577 | 15.14 | -7.86 |
| Total valid votes | | 3,810 | – | – |
| Rejected | | 39 | – | |
| Eligible voters / Turnout | | 9,172 | 41.96 | -11.72 |
Source(s) Source: Manitoba. Chief Electoral Officer (1999). Statement of Votes for the 37th Provincial General Election, September 21, 1999 (PDF) (Report). Winnipeg: Elections Manitoba.

=== 1988 ===
1988 Manitoba general election: Rupertsland
| Party | Candidate | Votes | % | ±% |
|---|---|---|---|---|
| New Democratic | Elijah Harper | 2,206 | 51.75 | -8.67 |
| Progressive Conservative | Joe Guy Wood | 1,419 | 33.29 | 8.85 |
| Liberal | Maurice Berens | 638 | 14.97 | -0.18 |
| Total valid votes | | 4,263 | – | – |
| Rejected | | 2 | – | |
| Eligible voters / Turnout | | 9,884 | 43.15 | 1.19 |
Source(s) Source: Manitoba. Chief Electoral Officer (1999). Statement of Votes for the 37th Provincial General Election, September 21, 1999 (PDF) (Report). Winnipeg: Elections Manitoba.

=== 1990 ===
1990 Manitoba general election: Rupertsland
| Party | Candidate | Votes | % | ±% |
|---|---|---|---|---|
| New Democratic | Elijah Harper | 3,798 | 77.37 | 25.62 |
| Progressive Conservative | Hugh Wynne | 804 | 16.38 | -16.91 |
| Liberal | George Kernaghan | 307 | 6.25 | -8.71 |
| Total valid votes | | 4,909 | – | – |
| Rejected | | 19 | – | |
| Eligible voters / Turnout | | 10,575 | 46.60 | 3.45 |
Source(s) Source: Manitoba. Chief Electoral Officer (1999). Statement of Votes for the 37th Provincial General Election, September 21, 1999 (PDF) (Report). Winnipeg: Elections Manitoba.

=== 1993 by-election ===
Manitoba provincial by-election, September 21, 1993: Rupertsland Resignation of Elijah Harper
| Party | Candidate | Votes | % | ±% |
|---|---|---|---|---|
| New Democratic | Eric Robinson | 1,648 | 49.43 | -27.94 |
| Liberal | George Munroe | 1,023 | 30.68 | 24.43 |
| Progressive Conservative | Eric Kennedy | 663 | 19.89 | 3.51 |
| Total valid votes | | 3,334 | – | – |
| Rejected | | N/A | – | |
| Eligible voters / Turnout | | N/A | – | – |
Source(s) Source: Manitoba. Chief Electoral Officer (1999). Statement of Votes for the 37th Provincial General Election, September 21, 1999 (PDF) (Report). Winnipeg: Elections Manitoba.

=== 1995 ===
1995 Manitoba general election: Rupertsland
| Party | Candidate | Votes | % | ±% | Expenditures |
|---|---|---|---|---|---|
| New Democratic | Eric Robinson | 2,249 | 50.80 | 1.37 | $22,077.00 |
| Liberal | Harry Wood | 1,018 | 23.00 | -7.69 | $25,182.52 |
| Progressive Conservative | Eric Kennedy | 619 | 13.98 | -5.90 | $8,427.91 |
| First Peoples Party | Jerry Fontaine | 541 | 12.22 | – | $14,852.48 |
| Total valid votes | | 4,427 | – | – | |
| Rejected | | 22 | – | | |
| Eligible voters / turnout | | 9,924 | 44.83 | – | |
Source(s) Source: Manitoba. Chief Electoral Officer (1999). Statement of Votes for the 37th Provincial General Election, September 21, 1999 (PDF) (Report). Winnipeg: Elections Manitoba.

=== 1999 ===
1999 Manitoba general election: Rupertsland
| Party | Candidate | Votes | % | ±% | Expenditures |
|---|---|---|---|---|---|
| New Democratic | Eric Robinson | 2,007 | 59.15 | 8.35 | $25,058.00 |
| Liberal | Darcy Wood | 708 | 20.87 | -2.13 | $28,387.14 |
| Progressive Conservative | Fred Harper | 678 | 19.98 | 6.00 | $31,774.52 |
| Total valid votes | | 3,393 | – | – | |
| Rejected | | 12 | – | | |
| Eligible voters / turnout | | 8,791 | 38.73 | -6.10 | |
Source(s) Source: Manitoba. Chief Electoral Officer (1999). Statement of Votes for the 37th Provincial General Election, September 21, 1999 (PDF) (Report). Winnipeg: Elections Manitoba.

=== 2003 ===
2003 Manitoba general election: Rupertsland
| Party | Candidate | Votes | % | ±% | Expenditures |
|---|---|---|---|---|---|
| New Democratic | Eric Robinson | 2,203 | 87.52 | 28.37 | $17,690.80 |
| Liberal | Orville Woodford | 162 | 6.44 | -14.43 | $2,564.46 |
| Progressive Conservative | Cory Phillips | 152 | 6.04 | -13.94 | $450.94 |
| Total valid votes | | 2,517 | – | – | |
| Rejected | | 17 | – | | |
| Eligible voters / turnout | | 9,011 | 28.12 | -10.61 | |
| New Democratic hold | | Swing | | - | |
Source(s) Source: Manitoba. Chief Electoral Officer (2003). Statement of Votes for the 38th Provincial General Election, June 3, 2003 (PDF) (Report). Winnipeg: Elections Manitoba.

=== 2007 ===
2007 Manitoba general election: Rupertsland
| Party | Candidate | Votes | % | ±% | Expenditures |
|---|---|---|---|---|---|
| New Democratic | Eric Robinson | 2,092 | 58.45 | -29.07 | $23,296.64 |
| Progressive Conservative | David Harper | 1,285 | 35.90 | 29.86 | $8,233.12 |
| Liberal | Earl Fontaine | 202 | 5.64 | -0.79 | $3,911.36 |
| Total valid votes | | 3,579 | – | – | |
| Rejected | | 15 | – | | |
| Eligible voters / turnout | | 10,727 | 33.50 | 5.38 | |
| New Democratic hold | | Swing | | - | |
Source(s) Source: Manitoba. Chief Electoral Officer (2007). Statement of Votes for the 39th Provincial General Election, May 22, 2007 (PDF) (Report). Winnipeg: Elections Manitoba.

=== 2011 ===
2011 Manitoba general election: Kewatinook
| Party | Candidate | Votes | % | ±% | Expenditures |
|---|---|---|---|---|---|
| New Democratic | Eric Robinson | 2,043 | 56.81 | −1.40 | $39,824.28 |
| Progressive Conservative | Michael Birch | 1,389 | 38.62 | +2.87 | $35,204.76 |
| Green | Philip Green | 94 | 2.61 | – | $1,571.33 |
| Liberal | Orville Woodford | 49 | 1.36 | −4.26 | $0 |
| Total valid votes | | 3,575 | – | | |
| Rejected | | 22 | – | | |
| Eligible voters / turnout | | 10,081 | 35.68 | | |
| New Democratic hold | | Swing | | - | |
Source(s) Source: Manitoba. Chief Electoral Officer (2011). Statement of Votes for the 40th Provincial General Election, October 4, 2011 (PDF) (Report). Winnipeg: Elections Manitoba.

=== 2016 ===
2016 provincial election redistributed results
| Party | % |
|---|---|
| Liberal | 42.0 |
| New Democratic | 40.7 |
| Progressive Conservative | 17.2 |

2016 Manitoba general election
| Party | Candidate | Votes | % | ±% | Expenditures |
|---|---|---|---|---|---|
| Liberal | Judy Klassen | 1,565 | 49.73 | 48.36 | $30,958.72 |
| New Democratic | Eric Robinson | 1,207 | 38.35 | -18.79 | $34,619.23 |
| Progressive Conservative | Edna Nabess | 375 | 11.92 | -26.94 | $24,449.08 |
| Total valid votes | | 3,147 | – | – | |
| Rejected | | 135 | – | | |
| Eligible voters / turnout | | 13,500 | 24.31 | -11.37 | |
| Liberal gain from New Democratic | | Swing | | +33.42 | |
Source(s) Source: Manitoba. Chief Electoral Officer (2016). Statement of Votes for the 41st Provincial General Election, April 19, 2016 (PDF) (Report). Winnipeg: Elections Manitoba."Candidates: 41st General Election". Elections Manitoba. March 29, 2016.

=== 2019 ===
2019 Manitoba general election
| Party | Candidate | Votes | % | ±% | Expenditures |
|---|---|---|---|---|---|
| New Democratic | Ian Bushie | 1,932 | 67.08 | 28.73 | $6,214.15 |
| Liberal | Jason Harper | 535 | 18.58 | -31.15 | $4,369.37 |
| Progressive Conservative | Arnold Flett | 413 | 14.34 | 2.42 | none listed |
| Total valid votes | | 2,880 | – | – | |
| Rejected | | 52 | – | | |
| Eligible voters / turnout | | 13,422 | 21.84 | -2.47 | |
| New Democratic gain from Liberal | | Swing | | +23.3 | |
Source(s) Source: Manitoba. Chief Electoral Officer (2019). Statement of Votes for the 42nd Provincial General Election, September 10, 2019 (PDF) (Report). Winnipeg: Elections Manitoba.

=== 2023 ===
2023 Manitoba general election
| Party | Candidate | Votes | % | ±% | Expenditures |
|---|---|---|---|---|---|
| New Democratic | Ian Bushie | 1,820 | 59.28 | -7.80 | $13,875.86 |
| Progressive Conservative | Michael Birch | 1,058 | 34.46 | +20.12 | not filed |
| Liberal | Nellie Wood Monias | 192 | 6.25 | -12.32 | $1,614.02 |
| Total valid votes/expense limit | | 3,070 | 98.27 | – | $49,634.00 |
| Total rejected and declined ballots | | 54 | 1.73 | – | |
| Turnout | | 3,124 | 39.14 | +17.29 | |
| Eligible voters | | 7,982 | | | |
| New Democratic hold | | Swing | | -13.96 | |
Source(s) Source: Elections Manitoba

== Previous boundaries ==
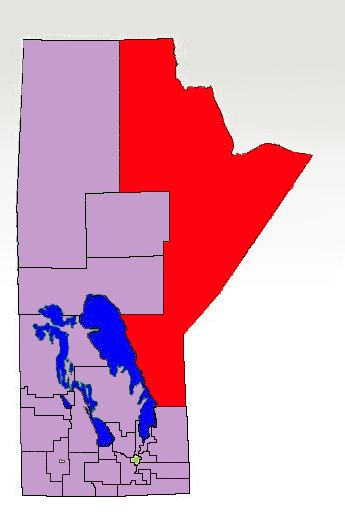
The 1998–2011 boundaries for Rupertsland highlighted in red

== See also ==
- List of Manitoba provincial electoral districts
- Canadian provincial electoral districts
