= Judy Klassen =

Canadian politician

Leader of the Manitoba Liberal Party Interim
- In office 21 October 2016 – 13 June 2017
- Preceded by: Rana Bokhari
- Succeeded by: Dougald Lamont

Member of the Legislative Assembly of Manitoba for Keewatinook
- In office 19 April 2016 – 12 August 2019
- Preceded by: Eric Robinson
- Succeeded by: Ian Bushie

Personal details
- Party: Liberal

Judy Klassen is a Canadian provincial politician who was interim leader of the Manitoba Liberal Party from October 2016 to June 2017, succeeding Rana Bokhari. Klassen was first elected as the Member of the Legislative Assembly of Manitoba for the riding of Keewatinook (then spelled Kewatinook) in the 2016 provincial election. She defeated incumbent New Democratic Party (NDP) MLA and Deputy Premier Eric Robinson in a closely contested race.

In April 2019, Klassen announced that she would not seek re-election in Keewatinook, instead seeking the federal Liberal nomination for the riding of Churchill—Keewatinook Aski in the 2019 federal election. In July 2019, Klassen was acclaimed as the Liberal candidate. Her provincial riding covered much of the eastern portion of the federal riding. However, she lost by a margin of more than two to one to incumbent Niki Ashton of the NDP.

Klassen grew up in St. Theresa Point First Nation and has a business studies diploma from Red River College in Steinbach.

== Electoral history ==
=== 2019 Canadian federal election ===
2019 Canadian federal election: Churchill—Keewatinook Aski
| Party | Candidate | Votes | % | ±% | Expenditures |
|---|---|---|---|---|---|
| New Democratic | Niki Ashton | 11,919 | 50.3 | | |
| Liberal | Judy Klassen | 5,616 | 23.7 | | |
| Conservative | Cyara Bird | 4,714 | 19.9 | | |
| Green | Ralph McLean | 1,144 | 4.8 | | |
| People's | Ken Klyne | 294 | 1.2 | | |
| Total valid votes/Expense limit | | 23,687 | 100.0 | | |
| Total rejected ballots | | 190 | | | |
| Turnout | | 23,877 | 48.8 | | |
| Eligible voters | | 48,949 | | | |
Source: Elections Canada

=== 2016 Manitoba general election ===
2016 Manitoba general election: Keewatinook
| Party | Candidate | Votes | % | ±% | Expenditures |
|---|---|---|---|---|---|
| Liberal | Judy Klassen | 1,565 | 49.73 | 48.36 | $30,958.72 |
| New Democratic | Eric Robinson | 1,207 | 38.35 | -18.79 | $34,619.23 |
| Progressive Conservative | Edna Nabess | 375 | 11.92 | -26.94 | $24,449.08 |
| Total valid votes | | 3,147 | – | – | |
| Rejected | | 135 | – | | |
| Eligible voters / turnout | | 13,500 | 24.31 | -11.37 | |
| Liberal gain from New Democratic | | Swing | | +33.42 | |
Source(s) Source: Manitoba. Chief Electoral Officer (2016). Statement of Votes for the 41st Provincial General Election, April 19, 2016 (PDF) (Report). Winnipeg: Elections Manitoba."Candidates: 41st General Election". Elections Manitoba. 29 March 2016.
