= Ian Bushie =

Manitoba MLA

The Honourable Ian Bushie MLA

Minister of Natural Resources and Indigenous Futures
- Incumbent
- Assumed office November 13, 2024
- Premier: Wab Kinew
- Preceded by: Jamie Moses (Minister of Natural Resources)

Minister of Municipal and Northern Relations
- In office October 18, 2023 – November 13, 2024
- Premier: Wab Kinew
- Preceded by: Andrew Smith (Municipal Relations); Eileen Clarke (Northern Relations)
- Succeeded by: Glen Simard

Member of the Legislative Assembly of Manitoba for Keewatinook
- Incumbent
- Assumed office September 10, 2019
- Preceded by: Judy Klassen

Personal details
- Party: New Democratic

Ian Bushie is a Canadian politician, who was elected to the Legislative Assembly of Manitoba in the 2019 Manitoba general election. He represents the electoral district of Keewatinook as a member of the Manitoba New Democratic Party.

He is a member of the Hollow Water First Nation, and was a candidate for the leadership of the Assembly of Manitoba Chiefs in 2008. He serves as Minister of Natural Resources and Indigenous Futures in Premier Wab Kinew's Cabinet. Bushie previously served as the Minister of Municipal and Northern Relations.

== Electoral history ==
2023 Manitoba general election: Keewatinook
Party	Candidate	Votes	%	±%	Expenditures
New Democratic	Ian Bushie	1,820	59.28	-7.80	$13,875.86
Progressive Conservative	Michael Birch	1,058	34.46	+20.12	not filed
Liberal	Nellie Wood Monias	192	6.25	-12.32	$1,614.02
Total valid votes/expense limit		3,070	98.27	–	$49,634.00
Total rejected and declined ballots		54	1.73	–	
Turnout		3,124	39.14	+17.29	
Eligible voters		7,982			
New Democratic hold		Swing		-13.96	
Source(s) Source: Elections Manitoba

2019 Manitoba general election: Keewatinook
Party	Candidate	Votes	%	±%	Expenditures
New Democratic	Ian Bushie	1,932	67.08	28.73	$6,214.15
Liberal	Jason Harper	535	18.58	-31.15	$4,369.37
Progressive Conservative	Arnold Flett	413	14.34	2.42	none listed
Total valid votes		2,880	–	–	
Rejected		52	–		
Eligible voters / turnout		13,422	21.84	-2.47	
New Democratic gain from Liberal		Swing		+23.3	
Source(s) Source: Manitoba. Chief Electoral Officer (2019). Statement of Votes for the 42nd Provincial General Election, September 10, 2019 (PDF) (Report). Winnipeg: Elections Manitoba.
