= Harvey Bostrom =

Canadian politician

Member of the Legislative Assembly of Manitoba for Rupertsland
- In office June 28, 1973 – November 17, 1981
- Preceded by: Jean Allard
- Succeeded by: Elijah Harper

Personal details
- Born: February 11, 1946 (age 80) Saint Boniface, Manitoba
- Party: New Democratic
- Education: University of Manitoba
- Profession: Teacher, economist

Harvey Kenneth Bostrom (born February 11, 1946, in Saint Boniface, Manitoba) is a former politician in Manitoba, Canada. He was a New Democratic member of the Legislative Assembly of Manitoba from 1973 to 1981.

The son of Joseph Rubin Bostrom, he was educated at the University of Manitoba, and subsequently worked as a teacher and economist. In 1969, Bostrom married Sandra Louise McNabb. He was first elected to the Manitoba legislature in the provincial election of 1973, in the northern riding of Rupertsland. Despite his relative youth and inexperience, he was appointed to the cabinet of Edward Schreyer on December 23, 1974, being named as Minister of Cooperative Development with responsibility for Lands and Renewable Resources. He was named Minister of Renewable Resources and Transportation Services on October 15, 1975, and held this position until the Schreyer government was defeated in the election of 1977.

Bostrom himself was re-elected in the 1977 election, with a reduced majority. In 1979, he supported Howard Pawley's successful bid to succeed Schreyer as party leader. Bostrom did not seek re-election in the 1981 election.

He entered the civil service after leaving politics, and become the executive director of the province's Native Affairs Secretariat (later renamed the Aboriginal Affairs Secretariat) in 1990. He was appointed acting deputy minister of Aboriginal and Northern Affairs by NDP Premier Gary Doer in 2001, and was given full deputy minister status shortly thereafter.
