= Cecil Smith (politician) =

Canadian politician

Cecil Morris Smith

Member of Parliament for Churchill
- In office July 1974 – March 1979
- Preceded by: Charles Keith Taylor
- Succeeded by: Rodney Murphy

Personal details
- Born: 23 June 1927 Treherne, Manitoba, Canada
- Died: 24 April 1988 (aged 60)
- Party: Progressive Conservative

Cecil Morris Smith (23 June 1927 – 24 April 1988) was a Canadian politician who served as a member of the House of Commons of Canada of the Progressive Conservative party. He was born in Treherne, Manitoba and became an auctioneer and public servant by career.

He was elected at the Churchill riding in the 1974 general election and served one term in the 30th Canadian Parliament. Smith was defeated at the riding by Rodney Murphy of the New Democratic Party in the 1979 federal election, and again in the 1980 election.

== Electoral history ==
1979 Canadian federal election: Churchill
Party	Candidate	Votes	%	±%
New Democratic	Rod Murphy	12,544	51.7	+21.0
Progressive Conservative	Cecil Smith	7,802	32.1	-8.8
Liberal	Andrew Kirkness	3,936	16.2	-10.1
Total valid votes		24,282	100.0	

1974 Canadian federal election: Churchill
Party	Candidate	Votes	%	±%
Progressive Conservative	Cecil Smith	11,225	40.9	+6.4
New Democratic	Dan Reagan	8,415	30.7	-2.4
Liberal	Jean René Allard	7,212	26.3	-4.9
Social Credit	Ed Heinrichs	577	2.1	
Total valid votes		27,429	100.0	
