= Eric Robinson (Canadian politician) =

Canadian politician

5th Deputy Premier of Manitoba
- In office November 3, 2009 – May 3, 2016 Serving with Rosann Wowchuk until 2011; Kerri Irvin-Ross from 2015
- Premier: Greg Selinger
- Preceded by: Rosann Wowchuk
- Succeeded by: Heather Stefanson

Manitoba Minister of Aboriginal and Northern Affairs
- In office November 3, 2009 – April 19, 2016
- Premier: Greg Selinger
- Preceded by: Oscar Lathlin
- Succeeded by: Eileen Clarke
- In office October 5, 1999 – September 25, 2002
- Premier: Gary Doer
- Preceded by: David Newman
- Succeeded by: Oscar Lathlin

Manitoba Minister of Culture, Heritage, Tourism and Sport
- In office September 25, 2002 – November 3, 2009
- Premier: Gary Doer
- Preceded by: Ron Lemieux
- Succeeded by: Flor Marcelino

Member of the Legislative Assembly of Manitoba for Kewatinook Rupertsland 1993–2011
- In office October 4, 2011 – April 19, 2016
- Preceded by: new constituency
- Succeeded by: Judy Klassen
- In office September 21, 1993 – October 4, 2011
- Preceded by: Elijah Harper
- Succeeded by: constituency abolished

Personal details
- Born: February 5, 1953 (age 73) Norway House, Manitoba
- Party: New Democratic Party

Eric Robinson (born February 5, 1953) is an Aboriginal Canadian politician in Manitoba. He was previously a member of the Manitoba legislature, and a cabinet minister in the New Democratic government of Greg Selinger.

Born in Norway House, Manitoba, he was placed in a residential school at the age of five. Robinson is a member of the Cross Lake First Nation, covered under Treaty 5. Robinson worked at a variety of jobs including dishwasher in Churchill, an addiction counsellor in British Columbia and a radio disc jockey. He has been active in Aboriginal issues for several years, and has worked for the Assembly of First Nations and the Brotherhood of Indian Nations, as well as other organizations promoting native rights within Canada.

Before entering provincial politics, Robinson was also a producer and broadcaster for the Canadian Broadcasting Corporation, and worked for Native Communications Incorporated. In 1985, he co-authored a work entitled Infested Blanket, an historical indictment of the Canadian government's past dealings with Aboriginal peoples.

Robinson entered provincial politics on September 21, 1993, winning a by-election in the northern riding of Rupertsland (he replaced Elijah Harper in the assembly). Running for the NDP, Robinson received 1697 votes; his closest opponent, Liberal George Munroe, received 1023.

Robinson was easily re-elected in the provincial election of 1995, and served as the NDP's critic for Aboriginal and Northern Affairs. Also in 1995, he supported Lorne Nystrom for leader of the federal New Democratic Party.

After the NDP won a majority government in the 1999 election, Premier Gary Doer named Robinson Minister of Aboriginal and Northern Affairs with responsibility for the Communities Economic Development Fund on October 5, 1999. Following a cabinet shuffle on September 25, 2002, he became Minister of Culture, Heritage and Tourism with responsibility for Sport.

In 2003, Robinson supported Bill Blaikie's campaign to become leader of the federal NDP. In the 2003 provincial election, Robinson was re-elected with over 86% of the vote in his riding. He was returned again in the 2007 election. In 2007, he was reassigned as Minister of Culture, Heritage, Tourism and Sport.

In 2026, Robinson endorsed Tanille Johnston in that year's federal NDP leadership race.

== Election history ==
=== 2016 Manitoba general election ===
2016 Manitoba general election: Keewatinook
| Party | Candidate | Votes | % | ±% | Expenditures |
|---|---|---|---|---|---|
| Liberal | Judy Klassen | 1,565 | 49.73 | 48.36 | $30,958.72 |
| New Democratic | Eric Robinson | 1,207 | 38.35 | -18.79 | $34,619.23 |
| Progressive Conservative | Edna Nabess | 375 | 11.92 | -26.94 | $24,449.08 |
| Total valid votes | | 3,147 | – | – | |
| Rejected | | 135 | – | | |
| Eligible voters / turnout | | 13,500 | 24.31 | -11.37 | |
| Liberal gain from New Democratic | | Swing | | +33.42 | |
Source(s) Source: Manitoba. Chief Electoral Officer (2016). Statement of Votes for the 41st Provincial General Election, April 19, 2016 (PDF) (Report). Winnipeg: Elections Manitoba."Candidates: 41st General Election". Elections Manitoba. 29 March 2016.

=== 2011 Manitoba general election ===
2011 Manitoba general election: Kewatinook
| Party | Candidate | Votes | % | ±% | Expenditures |
|---|---|---|---|---|---|
| New Democratic | Eric Robinson | 2,043 | 56.81 | −1.40 | $39,824.28 |
| Progressive Conservative | Michael Birch | 1,389 | 38.62 | +2.87 | $35,204.76 |
| Green | Philip Green | 94 | 2.61 | – | $1,571.33 |
| Liberal | Orville Woodford | 49 | 1.36 | −4.26 | $0 |
| Total valid votes | | 3,575 | – | | |
| Rejected | | 22 | – | | |
| Eligible voters / turnout | | 10,081 | 35.68 | | |
| New Democratic hold | | Swing | | - | |
Source(s) Source: Manitoba. Chief Electoral Officer (2011). Statement of Votes for the 40th Provincial General Election, October 4, 2011 (PDF) (Report). Winnipeg: Elections Manitoba.

=== 2007 Manitoba general election ===
2007 Manitoba general election: Rupertsland
| Party | Candidate | Votes | % | ±% | Expenditures |
|---|---|---|---|---|---|
| New Democratic | Eric Robinson | 2,092 | 58.45 | -29.07 | $23,296.64 |
| Progressive Conservative | David Harper | 1,285 | 35.90 | 29.86 | $8,233.12 |
| Liberal | Earl Fontaine | 202 | 5.64 | -0.79 | $3,911.36 |
| Total valid votes | | 3,579 | – | – | |
| Rejected | | 15 | – | | |
| Eligible voters / turnout | | 10,727 | 33.50 | 5.38 | |
| New Democratic hold | | Swing | | - | |
Source(s) Source: Manitoba. Chief Electoral Officer (2007). Statement of Votes for the 39th Provincial General Election, May 22, 2007 (PDF) (Report). Winnipeg: Elections Manitoba.

=== 2003 Manitoba general election ===
2003 Manitoba general election: Rupertsland
| Party | Candidate | Votes | % | ±% | Expenditures |
|---|---|---|---|---|---|
| New Democratic | Eric Robinson | 2,203 | 87.52 | 28.37 | $17,690.80 |
| Liberal | Orville Woodford | 162 | 6.44 | -14.43 | $2,564.46 |
| Progressive Conservative | Cory Phillips | 152 | 6.04 | -13.94 | $450.94 |
| Total valid votes | | 2,517 | – | – | |
| Rejected | | 17 | – | | |
| Eligible voters / turnout | | 9,011 | 28.12 | -10.61 | |
| New Democratic hold | | Swing | | - | |
Source(s) Source: Manitoba. Chief Electoral Officer (2003). Statement of Votes for the 38th Provincial General Election, June 3, 2003 (PDF) (Report). Winnipeg: Elections Manitoba.

=== 1999 Manitoba general election ===
1999 Manitoba general election: Rupertsland
| Party | Candidate | Votes | % | ±% | Expenditures |
|---|---|---|---|---|---|
| New Democratic | Eric Robinson | 2,007 | 59.15 | 8.35 | $25,058.00 |
| Liberal | Darcy Wood | 708 | 20.87 | -2.13 | $28,387.14 |
| Progressive Conservative | Fred Harper | 678 | 19.98 | 6.00 | $31,774.52 |
| Total valid votes | | 3,393 | – | – | |
| Rejected | | 12 | – | | |
| Eligible voters / turnout | | 8,791 | 38.73 | -6.10 | |
Source(s) Source: Manitoba. Chief Electoral Officer (1999). Statement of Votes for the 37th Provincial General Election, September 21, 1999 (PDF) (Report). Winnipeg: Elections Manitoba.
