= Ronald Moore (Manitoba politician) =

Canadian politician

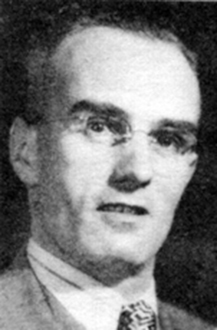

Member of Parliament for Churchill
- In office June 11, 1945 – June 26, 1949
- Preceded by: Thomas Alexander Crerar
- Succeeded by: George Weaver

Personal details
- Born: December 22, 1913 Foam Lake, Saskatchewan, Canada
- Died: November 21, 2003 (aged 89) Brandon, Manitoba, Canada
- Party: Co-operative Commonwealth Federation
- Profession: Politician; engineer

Ronald Stewart Moore (December 22, 1913 – November 21, 2003) was a Canadian politician from Manitoba. He served as a Co-operative Commonwealth Federation Member of Parliament MP in the House of Commons of Canada from 1945 to 1949 representing the riding of Churchill.

Moore was born in Foam Lake, Saskatchewan and worked on the Canadian National Railway as a young man. During World War II he enlisted with the Royal Canadian Navy and served from 1942 to 1945. He was elected to parliament after the war in the 1945 federal election.

After losing the 1949 federal election he returned to the CNR in Brandon, Manitoba before qualifying as an engineer and getting a job at CFB Shilo's heating plant. He remained active with the CCF and its successor, the New Democratic Party throughout his life. Moore attempted to regain his seat in the 1953 federal election but was unsuccessful. He died in 2003 in Brandon.

1945 Canadian federal election: Churchill
Party	Candidate	Votes	%	±%
Co-operative Commonwealth	Ronald Moore	5,226	38.8	
Liberal	George Dyer Weaver	4,359	32.4	-30.1
Progressive Conservative	Cecil Ruddock Neely	3,884	28.8	-8.7
Total valid votes		13,469	100.0	

Note: Progressive Conservative vote is compared to "National Government" vote in 1940 election.
