= Rebecca Chartrand =

Canadian politician (born 1970s)

The Honourable Rebecca Chartrand PC MP

Minister of Northern and Arctic Affairs and Minister responsible for the Canadian Northern Economic Development Agency
- Incumbent
- Assumed office May 13, 2025
- Prime Minister: Mark Carney
- Preceded by: Gary Anandasangaree

Member of Parliament for Churchill—Keewatinook Aski
- Incumbent
- Assumed office April 28, 2025
- Preceded by: Niki Ashton

Personal details
- Born: 1971 or 1972 (age 54–55) Winnipeg, Manitoba, Canada
- Party: Liberal
- Education: University of Manitoba (BEd, MEd)
- Occupation: Politician; teacher

Rebecca Chartrand PC MP is a Canadian politician who has been Minister of Northern and Arctic Affairs and Minister responsible for the Canadian Northern Economic Development Agency since 2025. A member of the Liberal Party of Canada, she was first elected to the House of Commons in the 2025 Canadian federal election, serving as the member of Parliament (MP) for Churchill—Keewatinook Aski.

On May 13, 2025, she was named to the 30th Canadian Ministry as minister of northern and Arctic affairs and minister responsible for the Canadian Northern Economic Development Agency.

== Early life and education ==
Chartrand is Anishinaabe from Treaty 4 territory in Manitoba. She earned a Bachelor of Education in 1997 and a Master of Education in 2016 from the University of Manitoba. Her master's thesis pertained to indigenous Anishinaabe pedagogy.

== Career ==
Chartrand served as Division Lead for Aboriginal Education at Seven Oaks School Division in Winnipeg for seven years. In 2017, Chartrand was appointed Executive Director of Indigenous Strategy at Red River College Polytechnic.

In 2019 Chartrand was criticized over the implementation of a prospective student survey for Indigenous students, which many found to be offensive due questions that were perceived as relying on stereotypes. Chartrand apologized and stated that the survey in question was "a new pilot project" and "a work in progress", and that it would be revised in response to the complaints.

Following her appointment as Minister of Northern and Arctic Affairs, allegations arose that Chartrand had mistreated employees who raised concerns about the controversial survey.

== Electoral record ==
2025 Canadian federal election: Churchill—Keewatinook Aski
** Preliminary results — Not yet official **
Party	Candidate	Votes	%	±%	Expenditures
Liberal	Rebecca Chartrand	9,422	45.61	+20.43	
New Democratic	Niki Ashton	5,971	28.90	–13.66	
Conservative	Lachlan De Nardi	4,859	23.52	–0.65	
People's	Dylan Young	408	1.97	–3.05	
Total valid votes/expense limit					
Total rejected ballots					
Turnout		20,660	42.95		
Eligible voters		48,104			
Liberal notional gain from New Democratic		Swing		+17.05	
Source: Elections Canada

2015 Canadian federal election: Churchill—Keewatinook Aski
Party	Candidate	Votes	%	±%	Expenditures
New Democratic	Niki Ashton	13,487	45.04	-6.65	$107,253.16
Liberal	Rebecca Chartrand	12,575	42.00	+22.13	$108,676.93
Conservative	Kyle G. Mirecki	3,090	10.32	-15.81	–
Green	August Hastmann	537	1.79	-0.52	–
Libertarian	Zachary Linnick	255	0.85	–	–
Total valid votes/expense limit		29,944	100.00		$233,135.69
Total rejected ballots		252	0.83	–	
Turnout		30,196	61.58	–	
Eligible voters		49,036			
New Democratic hold		Swing		-14.39	
Source: Elections Canada

Order of precedence
Preceded by Rebecca Alty as Member of the Cabinet	Order of Precedence of Canada as Member of the Cabinet	Succeeded by Julie Dabrusin as Member of the Cabinet
