= John Morrison (Manitoba politician) =

Canadian politician

John Morrison (April 17, 1868—June 6, 1930) was a politician in Manitoba, Canada. He served in the Legislative Assembly of Manitoba from 1916 to 1922.

Morrison was born in Mount Forest, Ontario, the son of Scottish immigrants who had come to Canada one year earlier. In 1878, he moved with his family to Selkirk, Manitoba where he completed his education. He worked as a merchant and was for four years the Office Trustee of Grand Rapids, Manitoba. In 1890, he married Sadie Blimco. Morrison was a Presbyterian and an active freemason.

Morrison was first elected to the Manitoba legislature in a by-election on September 16, 1916, in the newly created northern constituency of Rupertsland. Running as an independent, he was declared elected without opposition. Morrison subsequently affiliated with the governing Liberal Party, and was again elected without opposition under its banner in the 1920 provincial election. During this period, he served as a backbench supporter of Tobias Norris's government.

The Liberals were defeated by the United Farmers of Manitoba in the 1922 campaign. The election in Rupertsland was deferred until after the rest of the province had voted; with the Liberal defeat already confirmed, Morrison chose not to run again.

He died in Swan River at the age of 62.
