= Roy Brown (Manitoba politician) =

Canadian politician

Francis Roy Brown
- Born: 13 September 1896; Stockton, Manitoba, Canada
- Died: 30 November 1960 (aged 64); Winnipeg, Manitoba, Canada
- Occupations: Aviator, politician
- Spouse: Edith Mae Diana Peverette
- Children: Nola Peverette Brown (b. 1928); Georgia Grier Brown (b. 1935)
- Parents: Thomas Atkinson Brown; Rachel Rose Rubina Grier

Francis Roy Brown (13 September 1896 – 30 November 1960) was a Canadian aviator, businessman and politician. He served in the Cycle Corps and the Royal Flying Corps in WWI, and as a civilian test pilot in WWII. For three decades, he helped develop a bush pilot industry in the Canadian Prairies. Brown later served in the Legislative Assembly of Manitoba as a Liberal-Progressive from 1953 to 1958.

== Early life and education ==
Brown was born on a farm in Stockton, Manitoba, on 13 September 1896. His parents were Thomas A. Brown and Rachael Rubena Rose. The family moved to Winnipeg in 1906, where he attended Kelvin High School. In 1914 he was Western Canadian cycling champion.

== Military service ==
Brown enlisted in the Cycle Corps at the beginning of World War I. He served overseas in France, seeing action at Ypres, Vimy Ridge, and Passchendaele. Brown joined the Royal Flying Corps in 1917, and remained with this group until the end of the war. As a pilot with No. 204 Squadron, he was shot down over Belgium.

== Aviation career ==
Brown returned to Canada in 1923 and in 1927 was hired as a pilot by Western Canada Airways (WCA), moving equipment and passengers to northern Manitoba. In the fall of 1929, Brown was intrinsic to a search and rescue mission in which he returned a group of seven men lost in unexplored reaches of the Arctic. In 1930, following WCA's expansion as Canadian Airways, Brown became superintendent of the company's prairie airmail operations. However, airmail became too expensive and the service was cancelled in 1932, and Brown became a regional chief pilot.

With three partners, Brown founded Wings Limited in 1934 and served as its president and operations manager. Canadian Pacific Railway bought the company in 1941, forming Canadian Pacific Airlines (CPA). Brown spent the next few years working for CPA, taking a leave of absence during WWII to serve as a test pilot for Macdonald Brothers Aircraft in Winnipeg, test flying more than 2,500 aircraft.

In 1947, Brown and Milt Ashton, a partner from Wings Limited, purchased their former bush flying operation from CPA as Central Northern Airways (later Transair). Brown served as its director.

He was also a member of the Winnipeg Flying Club, and an executive on the Wartime Pilots' and Observers Association.

== Politics ==
From 1953 to 1958, Brown represented the constituency of Rupertsland (now Keewatinook) in the Legislative Assembly of Manitoba, representing the Liberal-Progressive Party. He championed northern interests in the legislature but was defeated by a large margin in the 1958 general election.

== Personal life ==
Brown married Edith Mae Diana Peverette in 1923. They had two children: Nolla Peverette Brown and Georgia Greer Brown.

Francis Roy Brown was throughout his life mistaken for Arthur Roy Brown, the Canadian flying ace credited with defeating Baron Von Richthofen (a.k.a. The Red Baron). (Note: Both Francis Roy Brown and Arthur Roy Brown went by their middle names; they were both in the Royal Flying Corps; they both married British women called Edith in 1923; they both took up careers in aviation, owning their own companies; and they looked somewhat alike.) The two Roy Browns became friends after they first met at a convention, for former prisoners-of-war in 1937. Amongst their circle of wartime friends, F. Roy Brown would be known as "Arctic Roy", while A. Roy Brown was known as "Richthofen Roy".

Brown died in Winnipeg on 30 November 1960. He was inducted into Canada's Aviation Hall of Fame in 1976. Brown Lake in northern Manitoba is named for him.
