= Charles Keith Taylor =

Canadian politician

Charles Keith Taylor QC

Member of Parliament for Churchill
- In office January 1973 – May 1974
- Preceded by: Robert Simpson
- Succeeded by: Cecil Smith
- Constituency: Churchill

Personal details
- Born: 23 June 1931 (age 94) Portage la Prairie, Manitoba, Canada
- Party: Progressive Conservative
- Profession: Politician; lawyer

Charles Keith Taylor QC (born 23 June 1931) was a Canadian politician and lawyer who served as a Member of Parliament (MP) for the riding of Churchill. He was a member of the Progressive Conservative Party of Canada.

== Biography ==
=== Early life ===
Keith Taylor was born at Portage la Prairie, Manitoba.

=== Career ===
He was first elected at the Churchill riding in the 1972 general election. He served his term in the 29th Parliament, but did not campaign for a second term in that office in the 1974 election.

== Electoral history ==
1972 Canadian federal election: Churchill
Party	Candidate	Votes	%	±%
Progressive Conservative	Keith Taylor	9,462	34.6	-7.2
New Democratic	Don Duff	9,059	33.1	+10.4
Liberal	Bruce Dunlop	8,536	31.2	-4.4
Independent	R. Jim Henry	327	1.2	
Total valid votes		27,384	100.0	
