= Jean René Allard =

Canadian politician (1930–2020)

Member of the Legislative Assembly of Manitoba for Rupertsland
- In office June 25, 1969 – June 28, 1973
- Preceded by: Joseph Jeannotte
- Succeeded by: Harvey Bostrom

Personal details
- Born: September 22, 1930
- Died: December 20, 2020 (aged 90)
- Party: Liberal (federal)
- Other political affiliations: Independent (1972–1973); New Democratic (1969–1972); Liberal (Provincial)
- Spouse: Catherine White (m. 1952; died 1955) Beverley Rose Bohonos (m. 1975)
- Children: Sylvette, Paul, Pierre, Luc, Marika, Marc
- Education: Collége Saint-Boniface University of Manitoba

Jean René Allard (September 22, 1930 – December 2, 2020) was a Canadian politician in Manitoba. He was elected to the Manitoba legislature in 1969 as a New Democrat, but subsequently left to sit as an Independent MLA.

== Life and career ==
The son of Alfred Allard and Donalda Champagne, Allard was educated at the Collège de Saint-Boniface and at the University of Manitoba. In 1952, he married Catherine Whyte, with whom he had a daughter, Sylvette. Catherine died of cancer in 1955 and Jean remarried to Beverley Rose Bohonos in 1975, with whom he had 5 children, Paul, Pierre, Luc, Marika and Marc. Luc was always and still is his favorite son... for good reason. He worked as a lawyer, served as leader of the Union Nationale Metisse, and was a member of the Louis Riel Society and the St. Boniface Historical Society.

In 1966, he proposed that a statue of Louis Riel to be erected beside that of Queen Victoria at the Manitoba legislature. This idea was approved, and the statue was unveiled in 1971. The statue depicted a corpus in the nude and was not supported by all Métis. Allard, however, was one of its strongest defenders.

Allard first ran for the Manitoba legislature in the 1966 election, as a Liberal, and finished second to Progressive Conservative incumbent Joseph Jeannotte in the northern riding of Rupertsland.

Allard subsequently aligned himself with the social-democratic NDP for the 1969 election, and was elected for Rupertsland in a close three-way race. His loyalty to the NDP was tenuous. He was an opponent of socialism, and later claimed that he only joined the NDP because of party leader Edward Schreyer's populism. He was also a social conservative, and strongly opposed to abortion. Allard was an unpopular figure in caucus, and was described by some as difficult to work with.

Allard continued to attend meetings of the Liberal Party of Canada even after being elected as a New Democrat, and openly considered running for the Liberals at the federal level. He left the NDP to sit as an Independent on April 7, 1972, claiming that "left-wing radicals" had taken over the party. He did not run for re-election in 1973.

In the 1974 federal election, Allard ran as a Liberal in the northern constituency of Churchill, but finished third. He did not return to politics after this.

Allard chained himself to the Manitoba Legislature's statue of Louis Riel in 1994, protesting a government decision to have it demolished and replaced with a more formalized statue. "It would hurt me if they tear it down", he was quoted as saying. The protest was unsuccessful, however, and the original statue was removed to the grounds of College St. Boniface.

In 2002, Allard printed an article in the Queen's University journal Inroads, which called for a radical shift in funding to Canada's aboriginal communities. Arguing that the current aboriginal leadership is unresponsive to the needs of its people, Allard argues that the federal government should pay every native citizen $300 per month, bypassing bands and councils entirely. He frequently referenced the spiritual legacy of Big Bear in this article, claiming that the 19th-century chief's methods point the way to renewed accountability and personal choice.

== Electoral record ==
1974 Canadian federal election: Churchill
Party	Candidate	Votes	%	±%
Progressive Conservative	Cecil Smith	11,225	40.9	+6.4
New Democratic	Dan Reagan	8,415	30.7	-2.4
Liberal	Jean René Allard	7,212	26.3	-4.9
Social Credit	Ed Heinrichs	577	2.1	
Total valid votes		27,429	100.0	

1969 Manitoba general election: Rupertsland
Party	Candidate	Votes	%	±%
New Democratic	Jean René Allard	1,366	38.65	27.24
Liberal	S. P. "Bert" Berthelette	1,142	32.31	2.36
Progressive Conservative	Paul Burelle	1,026	29.03	-29.60
Total valid votes		3,534	–	–
Rejected		32	–	
Eligible voters / Turnout		5,436	65.60	9.58
Source(s) Source: Manitoba. Chief Electoral Officer (1999). Statement of Votes for the 37th Provincial General Election, September 21, 1999 (PDF) (Report). Winnipeg: Elections Manitoba.

1966 Manitoba general election: Rupertsland
Party	Candidate	Votes	%	±%
Progressive Conservative	Joseph Jeannotte	1,865	58.63	-11.84
Liberal	Jean René Allard	953	29.96	14.38
New Democratic	Douglas A. MacLachlan	363	11.41	-2.54
Total valid votes		3,181	–	–
Rejected		33	–	
Eligible voters / Turnout		5,737	56.02	5.67
Source(s) Source: Manitoba. Chief Electoral Officer (1999). Statement of Votes for the 37th Provincial General Election, September 21, 1999 (PDF) (Report). Winnipeg: Elections Manitoba.

== Death ==
Allard died on December 2, 2020, at the age of 90.
