= Robert Simpson (Manitoba politician) =

Canadian politician

- Official 1968 portrait

Member of Parliament for Churchill
- In office June 1957 – September 1972
- Succeeded by: Charles Keith Taylor

Personal details
- Born: August 18, 1910 Cannington Manor, Saskatchewan, Canada
- Died: November 11, 1990 (aged 80)
- Party: Progressive Conservative
- Profession: Politician; miner

Robert Simpson (18 August 1910 – 11 November 1990) was a Canadian politician. He was a Progressive Conservative Member of Parliament (MP) for the riding of Churchill.

He was first elected at the Churchill riding in the 1957 general election, then re-elected there in 1958, 1962, 1963, 1965 and 1968. He served in the House of Commons from the 23rd through 28th Canadian Parliaments. He retired from politics at the 1972 election.

== Electoral history ==
1968 Canadian federal election: Churchill
Party	Candidate	Votes	%	±%
Progressive Conservative	Robert Simpson	9,009	41.8	-9.2
Liberal	Frank Dembinsky	7,673	35.6	+8.6
New Democratic	Brian Koshul	4,888	22.7	+7.0
Total valid votes		21,570	100.0	

1965 Canadian federal election: Churchill
Party	Candidate	Votes	%	±%
Progressive Conservative	Robert Simpson	10,773	51.0	-2.3
Liberal	F.L. Jobin	5,694	27.0	-6.1
New Democratic	Ken MacMaster	3,306	15.6	+2.0
Social Credit	Curt R. Shielman	1,352	6.4	
Total valid votes		21,125	100.0	

1963 Canadian federal election: Churchill
Party	Candidate	Votes	%	±%
Progressive Conservative	Robert Simpson	11,707	53.3	+2.0
Liberal	Bruce Dunlop	7,253	33.0	+2.5
New Democratic	Florence Matthews	2,990	13.6	-4.5
Total valid votes		21,950	100.0	

1962 Canadian federal election: Churchill
Party	Candidate	Votes	%	±%
Progressive Conservative	Robert Simpson	10,943	51.3	-13.4
Liberal	Francis Laurence Jobin	6,511	30.6	+7.2
New Democratic	Florence Matthews	3,858	18.1	+6.2
Total valid votes		21,312	100.0	

Note: NDP vote is compared to CCF vote in 1958 election.

1958 Canadian federal election: Churchill
Party	Candidate	Votes	%	±%
Progressive Conservative	Robert Simpson	11,506	64.7	+25.9
Liberal	Lorne Paterson Ferg	4,159	23.4	-7.9
Co-operative Commonwealth	Jack Freedman	2,118	11.9	+0.2
Total valid votes		17,783	100.0	

1957 Canadian federal election: Churchill
Party	Candidate	Votes	%	±%
Progressive Conservative	Robert Simpson	6,191	38.8	+20.8
Liberal	George Dyer Weaver	4,993	31.3	-9.1
Social Credit	Bruce Moore	2,891	18.1	-2.1
Co-operative Commonwealth	Gerald Robert Clarkson	1,870	11.7	-6.9
Total valid votes		15,945	100.0	
