= Niki Ashton =

Canadian politician (born 1982)

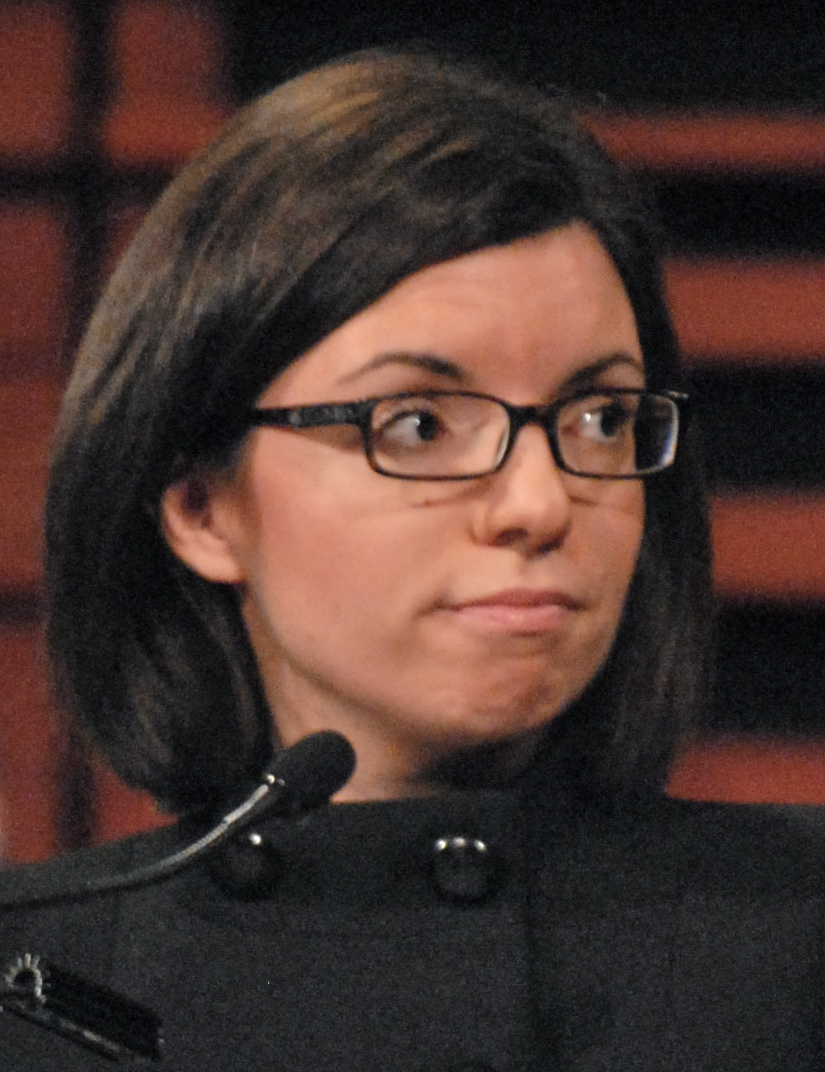
- Ashton in 2012

Member of Parliament for Churchill—Keewatinook Aski Churchill (2008–2015)
- In office October 14, 2008 – March 23, 2025
- Preceded by: Tina Keeper
- Succeeded by: Rebecca Chartrand

Chair of the Standing Committee on Status of Women
- In office June 21, 2011 – November 14, 2011
- Minister: Rona Ambrose
- Preceded by: Hedy Fry
- Succeeded by: Irene Mathyssen

Personal details
- Born: Niki Christina Ashton; September 9, 1982 (age 44) Thompson, Manitoba, Canada
- Party: New Democratic Party
- Spouse: Ryan Barker (m. 2011; div. 2017)
- Domestic partner: Bruce Moncur
- Children: 2
- Parent: Steve Ashton (father)
- Education: University of Manitoba (BA); Carleton University (MA)
- Occupation: Politician; university lecturer; researcher

Niki Christina Ashton (born September 9, 1982) is a Canadian politician. She served as the Member of Parliament for the federal electoral district of Churchill—Keewatinook Aski in Manitoba from 2008 to 2025 as a member of the New Democratic Party (NDP). Ashton ran for leadership of the federal NDP in 2012, placing seventh, and 2017, placing third.

== Early life ==
Ashton was born in Thompson, Manitoba. She is the daughter of Hariklia Dimitrakopoulou and former Manitoba provincial NDP cabinet minister Steve Ashton. Her father was born in England and her mother in Greece. Her paternal grandfather, John Ashton, was a Welsh-born chemical scientist who emigrated to Canada in 1967, where he worked for Inco (now Vale Canada). Ashton has one younger brother, Alexander. She attended École Riverside School and R. D. Parker Collegiate. She later attended the Li Po Chun United World College in Hong Kong. She earned a bachelor of arts degree in Global Political Economy from the University of Manitoba, and a master of arts in international affairs from Carleton University. She has been an instructor at the University College of the North.

She studied human rights and social justice at the Norman Paterson School of International Affairs.

In 2004, she was a coordinator and promoter of volunteering at the 2004 Summer Olympics in Athens. With her knowledge of Greek, she assisted the Canadian and Chinese Olympic teams.

== Career ==
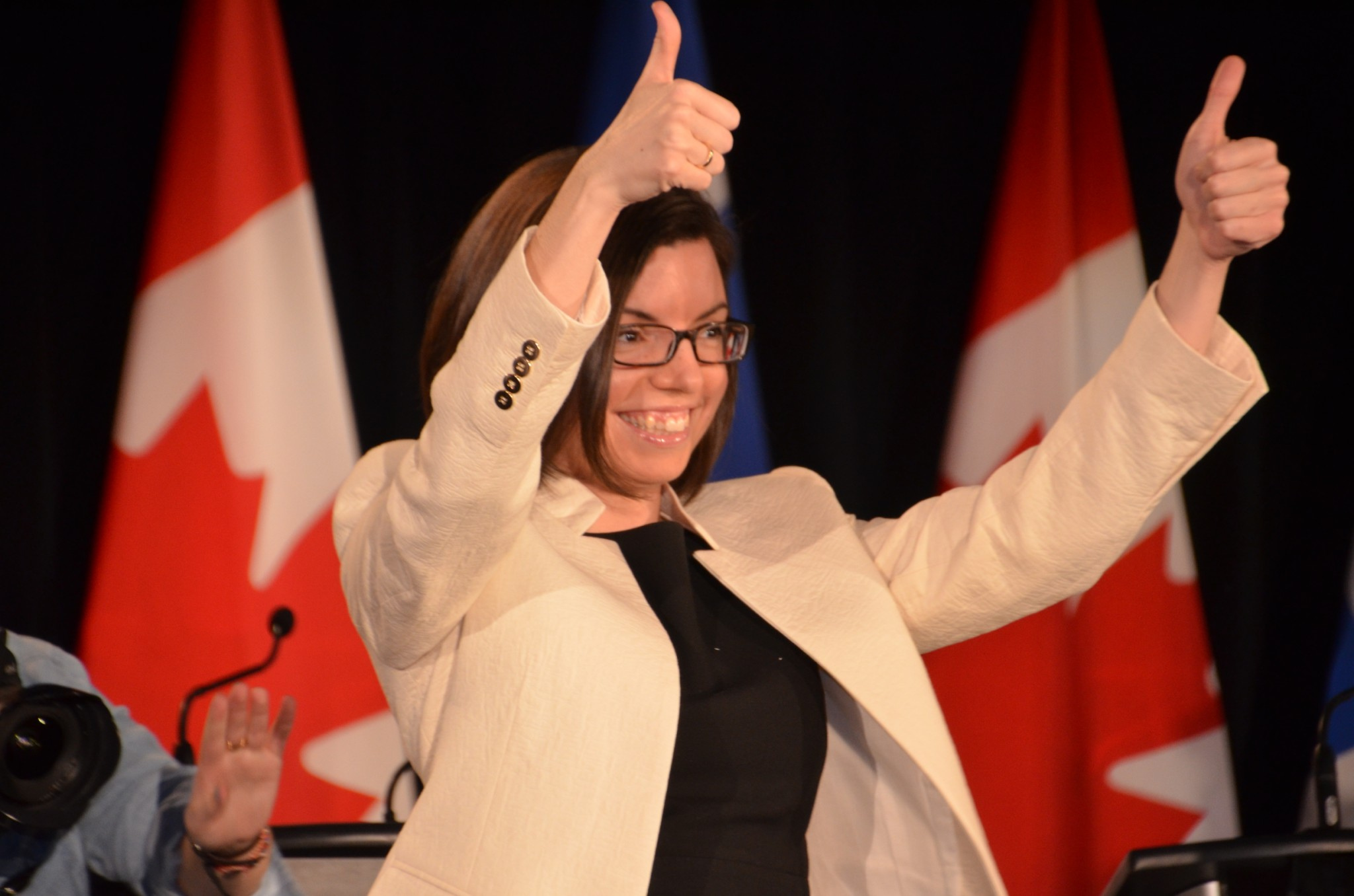
Ashton in 2012

In 2005, she defeated incumbent New Democratic Party Member of Parliament Bev Desjarlais for the NDP nomination due in part to her support of same-sex marriage after Desjarlais broke party ranks to vote against the Civil Marriage Act. Desjarlais subsequently quit the party, sat as an independent for the remainder of her term in the 38th Parliament and ran against Ashton as an independent candidate in the election in the Churchill riding in the 2006 Canadian federal election. The major themes in Ashton's campaign included getting federal funding for the University College of the North and a federal agreement for northern development.

Although the labour unions in Thompson endorsed Ashton, the NDP vote nevertheless split between Ashton and Desjarlais, and Liberal candidate Tina Keeper won the riding.

Ashton defeated Keeper in the 2008 election, regaining the riding for the NDP.

On November 7, 2011, in Montreal, Ashton launched her campaign as the ninth person to join the 2012 NDP leadership race. At the age of 29, she was the youngest of the candidates. She placed seventh with 5.7% of the vote at the March 24, 2012 leadership election and was eliminated on the first ballot.

Since first being elected in 2008, Ashton was elected as the Chair of the House of Commons Standing Committee on the Status of Women in the 40th Parliament of Canada. She has also served as the NDP Post-Secondary and Youth critic, as the Rural and Community Development critic and from 2012 to 2014 as the Status of Women Critic. On January 23, 2015, Ashton was appointed as the Aboriginal Affairs Critic in Canada's Official Opposition.

After the 2015 federal election, Ashton was appointed the NDP critic for Jobs, Employment and Workforce Development in the 42nd Canadian Parliament.

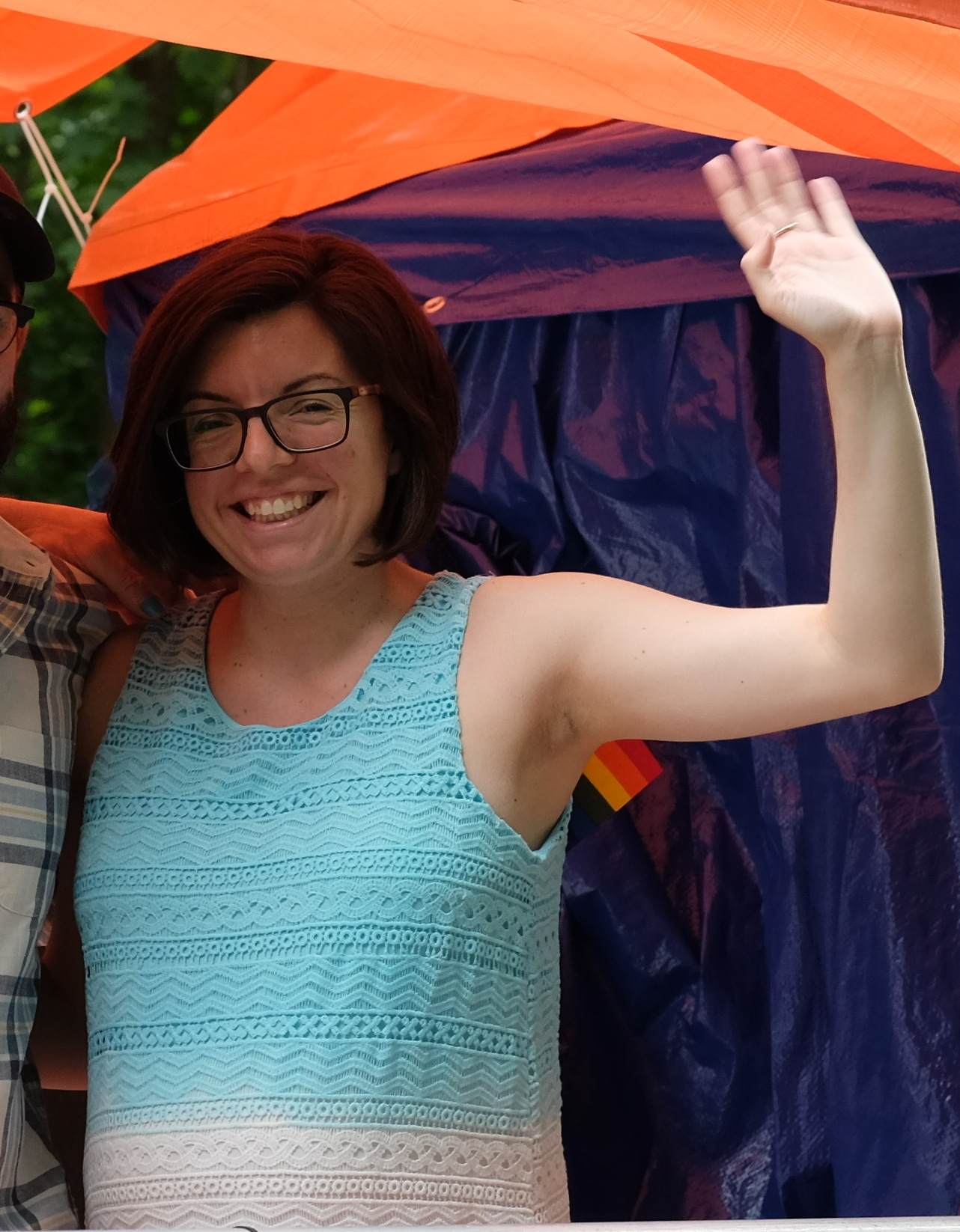
Niki Ashton at an LGBT pride event in 2017

Ashton announced her candidacy for the 2017 NDP leadership election on March 7, 2017. She placed third in the October 1, 2017 election, with 17.4% of the vote, just over 1,000 votes behind runner up Charlie Angus. Jagmeet Singh was elected leader on the first ballot.

Ashton was re-elected in the 2019 federal election. She was stripped of her critic roles on January 1, 2021, after revealing to the public on Twitter that she had travelled to Greece during the 2020 COVID-19 second wave to visit an "ailing grandmother." She had not informed party leadership of her travel plans beforehand. She was re-elected in the 2021 federal election.

In June 2024, media reports surfaced that Ashton, who frequently joined parliamentary proceedings remotely, billed taxpayers $17,641 for a family trip over Christmas 2022, citing stakeholder meetings on official language priorities. Ashton, her partner, and their children travelled from Thompson, Manitoba, to Ottawa, Quebec City, and Montreal, with some expenses covering leisure activities. After the story was released, Ashton agreed to return $2,900 or 16% of the amounts claimed.

Ashton was defeated in the 2025 federal election.

In 2026, Ashton endorsed Avi Lewis in that year's federal NDP leadership race.

== Political views ==
=== Domestic policy ===
During the 2017 New Democratic Party leadership election Ashton ran on a platform including:

- A focus on plans to create and maintain good-paying jobs for young people and working Canadians, and tackle the threat of climate change.
- A commitment to providing tuition-free post-secondary education.
- Advocating combatting the unequal distribution of wealth, the loss of value-added jobs, the "foreign ownership and trade deals that are selling us out".

Niki Ashton has criticized the Canada Infrastructure Bank for only funding public-private partnerships, and for its failure to complete any of its projects after four years of existence. In February 2022, Ashton introduced a bill to rewrite its mandate to focus on projects that tackle the impacts of climate change, and to fund publicly owned infrastructure instead of trying to involve private finance.

In October 2022, Ashton voted in favour of a symbolic motion proposed by Bloc Québécois leader Yves-François Blanchet that the House abolish the monarchy of Canada. While she acknowledged the Crown's historic role in making treaties with Indigenous peoples in Canada, she argued that it had subsequently become "a symbol of colonialism, a symbol of slavery, oppression, and repression and a symbol of conflict" and "an anachronism".

=== Foreign policy ===
During the 2019 Venezuelan presidential crisis, Ashton tweeted the following: "PM Trudeau sides with [U.S. President Donald] Trump's regime change agenda and Brazil's fascist President in support of someone calling for a military coup in Venezuela," She further commented:

No! We cannot support an agenda of economic or military coups. #HandsOffVenezuela.

Ashton has been a critic of the extradition case against Meng Wanzhou. She has "sponsored a petition in the House of Commons that calls for Meng’s immediate release; urged the government to “protect Canadian jobs” by allowing Huawei to participate in the roll-out of 5G in Canada; and encouraged a foreign policy review to develop an “independent” foreign policy on China." In November 2020, she organized a “Free Meng” event with the Canadian Foreign Policy Institute, the Canadian Peace Congress and the Hamilton Coalition to Stop War.

She is against the United States embargo against Cuba, and sponsored a petition in the House of Commons calling for the lifting of the embargo.

In 2022, Ashton retweeted a post linking to an episode of a podcast where hosts suggested that Deputy Prime Minister Chrystia Freeland's support for Ukraine in the Russo-Ukrainian War was tied to her "Nazi past." Senior policy advisor for the Ukrainian Canadian Congress Orest Zakydalsky criticized her for sharing the post in addition to comments from two other NDP MPs on the war.

== Personal life ==
Ashton can read, write and speak four languages: English, French, Greek and Spanish. She has also taken lessons in Cree, Russian, Turkish, Ukrainian and Mandarin.

Ashton married Ryan Barker in 2011. They separated in 2015 and divorced in 2017.

In May 2017, Ashton announced that she was pregnant. She commented, "Like millions of Canadian women I will carry on my work", and continued with her leadership campaign. She gave birth to twin boys in November 2017.

== Electoral record ==
2025 Canadian federal election: Churchill—Keewatinook Aski
** Preliminary results — Not yet official **
Party	Candidate	Votes	%	±%	Expenditures
Liberal	Rebecca Chartrand	9,422	45.61	+20.43	
New Democratic	Niki Ashton	5,971	28.90	–13.66	
Conservative	Lachlan De Nardi	4,859	23.52	–0.65	
People's	Dylan Young	408	1.97	–3.05	
Total valid votes/expense limit					
Total rejected ballots					
Turnout		20,660	42.95		
Eligible voters		48,104			
Liberal notional gain from New Democratic		Swing		+17.05	
Source: Elections Canada

2021 Canadian federal election: Churchill—Keewatinook Aski
Party	Candidate	Votes	%	±%	Expenditures
New Democratic	Niki Ashton	7,632	42.6	-7.7	$55,604.26
Liberal	Shirley Robinson	4,514	25.2	+5.3	$52,797.79
Conservative	Charlotte Larocque	4,330	24.2	+0.5	none listed
People's	Dylan Young	899	5.0	+3.8	$0.00
Green	Ralph McLean	552	3.1	-1.7	$0.00
Total valid votes/expense limit		17,927	98.8	–	$122,781.65
Total rejected ballots		210	1.2		
Turnout		18,137	36.6		
Eligible voters		49,579			
New Democratic hold		Swing		-6.5	
Source: Elections Canada

2019 Canadian federal election: Churchill—Keewatinook Aski
Party	Candidate	Votes	%	±%	Expenditures
New Democratic	Niki Ashton	11,919	50.3	+5.26	$62,221.20
Conservative	Cyara Bird	5,616	23.7	+13.38	none listed
Liberal	Judy Klassen	4,714	19.9	-22.1	$59,410.31
Green	Ralph McLean	1,144	4.8	+3.01	none listed
People's	Ken Klyne	294	1.2		$0.00
Total valid votes/expense limit		23,687	100.0		
Total rejected ballots		190			
Turnout		23,877	48.8		
Eligible voters		48,949			
New Democratic hold		Swing		-4.06	
Source: Elections Canada

2015 Canadian federal election: Churchill—Keewatinook Aski
Party	Candidate	Votes	%	±%	Expenditures
New Democratic	Niki Ashton	13,487	45.04	-6.65	$107,253.16
Liberal	Rebecca Chartrand	12,575	42.00	+22.13	$108,676.93
Conservative	Kyle G. Mirecki	3,090	10.32	-15.81	–
Green	August Hastmann	537	1.79	-0.52	–
Libertarian	Zachary Linnick	255	0.85	–	–
Total valid votes/expense limit		29,944	100.00		$233,135.69
Total rejected ballots		252	0.83	–	
Turnout		30,196	61.58	–	
Eligible voters		49,036			
New Democratic hold		Swing		-14.39	
Source: Elections Canada

2011 Canadian federal election: Churchill
Party	Candidate	Votes	%	±%	Expenditures
New Democratic	Niki Ashton	10,262	51.12	+3.36	–
Conservative	Wally Daudrich	5,256	26.18	+5.68	–
Liberal	Sydney Garrioch	4,087	20.36	-8.38	–
Green	Alberteen Spence	471	2.35	-0.94	–
Total valid votes/expense limit		20,076	100.00		
Total rejected ballots		107	0.53	-0.02	
Turnout		20,183	45.35	+5.20	
Eligible voters		44,509	–	–	

2008 Canadian federal election: Churchill—Keewatinook Aski
Party	Candidate	Votes	%	±%	Expenditures
New Democratic	Niki Ashton	8,734	47.76	+19.35	$79,086
Liberal	Tina Keeper	5,289	28.74	-11.94	–
Conservative	Wally Daudrich	3,773	20.50	+8.95	$45,616
Green	Saara Harvie	606	3.29	+1.69	$28
Total valid votes/expense limit		18,402	100.00		$91,452
Total rejected ballots		102	0.55	+0.19	
Turnout		18,504	40.15	-13.48	
New Democrat gain from Liberal		Swing	+		

2006 Canadian federal election: Churchill
Party	Candidate	Votes	%	Expenditures
Liberal	Tina Keeper	10,157	40.68	$75,179.50
New Democratic	Niki Ashton	7,093	28.41	$70,290.02
Independent	Bev Desjarlais	4,283	17.16	$23,042.68
Conservative	Nazir Ahmad	2,886	11.56	$23,875.20
Green	Jeff Fountain	401	1.61	$2,837.23
Independent	Brad Bodnar	146	0.58	$68.69
Total valid votes		24,966	100.00	
Total rejected ballots		90		
Turnout		25,056	55.70	
Electors on lists		44,982		
Sources: Official Results, Elections Canada and Financial Returns, Elections Canada.
