= Daniel Hamilton (Canadian politician) =

Canadian politician

Daniel Roy Hamilton (23 April 1892 – September 4, 1965) was a politician in Manitoba, Canada. He served in the Legislative Assembly of Manitoba as a Liberal-Progressive from 1941 to 1953.

Hamilton was first elected to the Manitoba legislature in the 1941 provincial election. A member of the governing Liberal-Progressive party, he defeated a pro-government independent named G.L. Van Vleit, 683 votes to 297, in the remote northern riding of Rupertsland. During this period, elections in Rupertsland were usually held at least two weeks after the rest of the province had voted because of difficulties in accessibility.

Hamilton defeated another pro-government candidate in the 1945 provincial election, and won by acclamation in 1949. He served as a government backbencher during his time in the legislature, through the Liberal-Progressive administrations of John Bracken, Stuart Garson and Douglas Campbell.

During his time in the legislature, Hamilton repeatedly urged that aboriginal Canadians living in Manitoba be given the right to vote. This was permitted by an act of the legislature in 1952. He retired from politics in 1953.
