= MacKay Indian Residential School =

MacKay Indian Residential School (also known as McKay Residential School) was part of the Canadian Residential School System in Northern Manitoba. It was one of the rare schools that established two different locations. The first school that ran from 1914 to 1933 on Fisher Island was located on Opaskwayak Cree Nation close to The Pas and the second was in Dauphin and ran from 1957 to 1969.
