= Lathlin =

Lathlin is a surname. Notable people with the surname include:

- Amanda Lathlin (1976–2026), Canadian politician
- Oscar Lathlin (1947–2008), Canadian politician
