= Frank Whitehead (Canadian politician) =

Canadian politician

Member of the Legislative Assembly of Manitoba for The Pas
- In office March 24, 2009 – May 16, 2014
- Preceded by: Oscar Lathlin
- Succeeded by: Amanda Lathlin

Personal details
- Party: New Democratic Party
- Occupation: First Nations band chief

Frank Whitehead is a Canadian politician. Formerly a chief of the Opaskwayak Cree Nation in northern Manitoba and a political advisor to Assembly of Manitoba Chiefs head Ron Evans, he was elected to the Legislative Assembly of Manitoba in a by-election on March 24, 2009, representing the electoral district of The Pas as a member of the New Democratic Party of Manitoba.

Whitehead was reelected in the 2011 general election.

He resigned on May 16, 2014 citing health reasons.

== Electoral record ==
Manitoba provincial by-election, March 24, 2009: The Pas Death of Oscar Lathlin
| Party | Candidate | Votes | % | ±% | Expenditures |
|---|---|---|---|---|---|
| New Democratic | Frank Whitehead | 2,949 | 75.11 | 6.25 | 25,898.41 |
| Progressive Conservative | Edna Nabess | 722 | 18.39 | -3.06 | 31,676.75 |
| Liberal | Maurice Berens | 255 | 6.50 | -3.19 | 9,255.99 |
| Total valid votes | | 3,926 | – | – | |
| Rejected | | 23 | – | | |
| Eligible voters / turnout | | 13,334 | 29.44 | – | |
| New Democratic hold | | Swing | | +4.66 | |
Source(s) Source: "2009 The Pas Byelection Results" (PDF). Elections Manitoba.
