= Northern Manitoba Trappers' Festival =

The Northern Manitoba Trappers’ Festival is an annual winter festival held in February in The Pas, Manitoba, Canada. It is Manitoba's oldest festival and one of Canada's oldest winter festivals. The festival celebrates a wide variety of skills and activities that were, and in many cases still are, a matter of survival for life in Northern Canada, including ice fishing, muskrat skinning, tea boiling, bannock baking, and chain saw events. The highlight of the festival is the sled dog race, known as the World Championship Dog Race.

== History ==
In 1916, a number of local pioneers organized The Pas Dog Derby to motivate the development of a better type of sled dog, and to publicize the opportunities and development in The Pas and Northern Manitoba. The Derby consisted of a series of festive events and activities that centered around a competitive dog race, which is now known as the World Championship Dog Race. At the time, the road system in Northern Manitoba was less developed and the use of sled dog teams was vital during Northern Manitoba winters. The festival continued until 1931 (except for the war years of 1917 and 1918) when economic conditions forced its suspension. Although the derby was commonly known as the Trappers’ Festival, it was also referred to as The Hudson Bay Dog Derby, The Pas Winter Festival, and the Northern Festival. The festival and World Championship Dog Race were revived in 1948 and have occurred every year since.

== World Championship Dog Race ==
The first race was held on March 17, 1916. It took place over 150 miles across frozen ice and snow, and was the longest course in the world. Nine teams entered The Pas Dog Derby that first year to compete for the grand prize of $1,000. From 1916 to 1931, the dog race took place over a distance of between 140 and 200 miles, with the race usually running from one town to another, and included Carrot River, Cranberry Portage, Flin Flon, and Cumberland House. When the Trappers Festival was revived in 1948 until 1976, the dog race was run in three daily laps of 50 miles each. Today, the race is run in three 35-mile heats held over three days. Racers begin each day at 10 a.m. on Halcrow Lake for a mass start. Mushers who achieve the lowest combined time score in each category over the three-day race are declared the winners. The World Championship Dog Race is affiliated with the International Federation of Sleddog Sports.
