= Harry Harapiak =

Canadian politician

Member of the Legislative Assembly of Manitoba for The Pas
- In office 1977–1990
- Preceded by: Ron McBryde
- Succeeded by: Oscar Lathlin

Personal details
- Born: September 17, 1938 Cowan, Manitoba, Canada
- Died: November 14, 2000 (aged 62)
- Party: New Democratic Party of Manitoba

Harry Myrislaw Harapiak (September 17, 1938 – November 14, 2000) was a politician in Manitoba, Canada. He served as a member of the Legislative Assembly of Manitoba from 1981 to 1990, and was a cabinet minister in the New Democratic Party government of Howard Pawley. His brother Leonard Harapiak was also a cabinet minister in the Pawley administration, and his sister Rosann Wowchuk was a cabinet minister in the governments of Gary Doer and Greg Selinger and retired before the 2011 Manitoba election.

The son of William John Harapiak and Mary Philipchuk, Harry Harapiak was born in Cowan, Manitoba and was educated there, at Minitonas College and at Coniston Continuation; he did not attend university. In the 1950s, he left the family farm to work at the Inco mines in Sudbury. He married Carol Anne Eastwood in 1962 in Coniston, Ontario and they had five children together - Marianne, Mark, Christine, Kelly and Chad. He returned to farming in Manitoba the following year. After a few years of subsistence farming, he began work with the Canadian National Railway. Harry served as a Kelsey School Board trustee in The Pas, Manitoba from 1973 to 1981.

He was first elected to the Manitoba legislature in the provincial election of 1981, for the northern riding of The Pas. Pawley's NDP won a majority government in this election, and on January 30, 1985, Harapiak was appointed Minister of Northern Affairs with responsibility for the Communities Economic Development Fund Act and some aspects of the Manitoba Natural Resources Development Act . He was re-elected without difficulty in the 1986 election and kept in his portfolio, without the additional responsibilities. On February 4, 1987, he was appointed Minister of Government Services with responsibility for the Workers Compensation Act (except as regards Worker Advisers).

The New Democrats were unexpectedly defeated in the legislature in early 1988, and were defeated in the election which followed. Harry Harapiak was re-elected for The Pas, and sat in the opposition benches for the next two years. He did not run for re-election in 1990, and returned to his private career as a VIA Rail Canada engineer. In 1997, he became a deacon in the Roman Catholic Church in Winnipeg.

On May 19, 1984, Harry's eldest daughter Marianne married Todd Lamb, the grandson of Tom Lamb from The Pas, Manitoba.

On April 13, 2005, Harry's daughter Christine Harapiak was appointed as a Judge in Manitoba.

Harry's eldest son Mark Harapiak is an actor based in Toronto. He has appeared in many productions at the Stratford Shakespeare Festival. Mark's wife, Blythe Wilson appeared in Mary Poppins on Broadway in 2011-2012.

Harry Harapiak died November 14, 2000, at the age of 62.
