= Ron Evans (politician) =

Canadian politician

Ron Evans (born 1957) is a former clergyman and politician in Manitoba, Canada. He is the former Chief for the Norway House Cree Nation and former Grand Chief of the Assembly of Manitoba Chiefs. A former priest in the Anglican Church of Canada, Evans is also a prominent figure in the Aboriginal community of northern Manitoba. He unsuccessfully sought election to both the Manitoba Legislature and the House of Commons of Canada, and has served as a band councillor and chief.

Evans was born and raised in Norway House, Manitoba, and was educated in Winnipeg, Calgary and La Tuque, Quebec. Prior to his career with the clergy and politics, Evans was a truck driver and commercial fisherman. As a priest, Evans is a member of the Diocesan Council in the Anglican Diocese of Keewatin and a member of the Anglican Council of Indigenous People. He served as a band councillor in Norway House from 1980 to 1988, and was the band's acting chief for two years during this period. He was elected as the band's chief in 1996, was re-elected in 1998 and 2002, and was also an executive councillor in the Manitoba Keewatinowi Okimakanak and the Assembly of Manitoba Chiefs. He stepped down as chief of Norway House Cree Nation to run for the AMC leadership. In addition to his political work, Evans is a member of the Norway House Fisherman's Co-op, and, until 2018, held a commercial fishing license. In 1998, Evans was presented with "The Order of the Buffalo Hunt" (late replaced by the Order of Manitoba) from then-Premier Gary Filmon.

In the 1999 provincial election, Evans was a candidate of the governing Progressive Conservative Party in the northern riding of The Pas. Despite the unpopularity of the Progressive Conservative party in other northern ridings, Evans's personal popularity was such that he was almost able to defeat the riding's incumbent MLA, New Democrat Oscar Lathlin (who is also aboriginal). Lathlin received 2952 votes, Evans 2737.

For the federal election of 2000, Evans switched parties and sought the Liberal nomination in the riding of Churchill. He was defeated by former MLA and MP Elijah Harper, who in turn lost to NDP candidate Bev Desjarlais in the general election.

Evans again ran for the Liberal nomination in the 2004 election, this time successfully. Once again, his personal popularity was such that he was able to run a credible campaign against a popular incumbent; nevertheless, he was defeated by Desjarlais by 8612 votes to 7604.

Evans was elected Grand Chief of the Assembly of Manitoba Chiefs (AMC) in 2005, a provincial body which advocates on behalf of all of Manitoba's First Nations. He was re-elected in August 2008. Marcel Balfour replaced Evans as chief of Norway House.

Evans decided not to seek a third term at AMC and on July 22, 2011 was re-elected chief of Norway House Cree Nation. He was defeated as chief by Larson Anderson in 2018 and stripped of his fishing licence by the Fisherman's Co-Op. As of the summer, 2019, Evans was campaigning for the Conservatives in The Pas (which no longer includes Norway house) in the 2019 provincial election.
