= Ron McBryde =

Canadian politician (1941–1989)

Member of the Legislative Assembly of Manitoba for The Pas
- In office 1969–1981
- Preceded by: John Carroll
- Succeeded by: Harry Harapiak

Personal details
- Born: October 23, 1941 Oliver, British Columbia, Canada
- Died: June 21, 1989 (aged 47) Calgary, Alberta, Canada
- Party: New Democratic Party of Manitoba

Sydney Ronald McBryde (October 23, 1941 – June 21, 1989) was a politician in Manitoba, Canada. He was a New Democratic member of the Legislative Assembly of Manitoba from 1969 to 1981, and served in the cabinet of Edward Schreyer.

McBryde was born in Oliver, British Columbia in 1941. The son of Sydney McBryde and Jean Myrtle Esplin, he was educated in British Columbia public schools and at Central Washington State College. After graduating, he became a community development worker in northern Manitoba. In 1963, McBryde married Gladys Tenning.

He was first elected to the Manitoba legislature in the provincial election of 1969, defeating Progressive Conservative incumbent John Carroll by 196 votes in the northern riding of The Pas.

The NDP formed a government after this election. McBryde initially served as a government backbencher, but entered cabinet as a Minister without Portfolio on December 1, 1971 when fellow northern MLA Joe Borowski was dropped from cabinet amid controversy. He left cabinet on April 13, 1972, but returned as Minister of Northern Affairs on November 1, 1972.

McBryde was easily re-elected in the election of 1973 over independent candidate George Takashima, his sole opponent. He continued to serve as Northern Affairs minister until the Schreyer government was defeated in the election of 1977. McBryde retained his own seat in the 1977 election, and was a prominent supporter of Howard Pawley in his successful bid to replace Schreyer as party leader in 1979.

McBryde did not seek re-election in 1981, in which the NDP under Pawley won a majority government. After the election, he was appointed as Deputy Minister to Northern Affairs minister Jay Cowan. He died in Calgary on June 21, 1989.
