= Otineka Mall =

Shopping mall in Opaskwayak Cree Nation, Manitoba, Canada

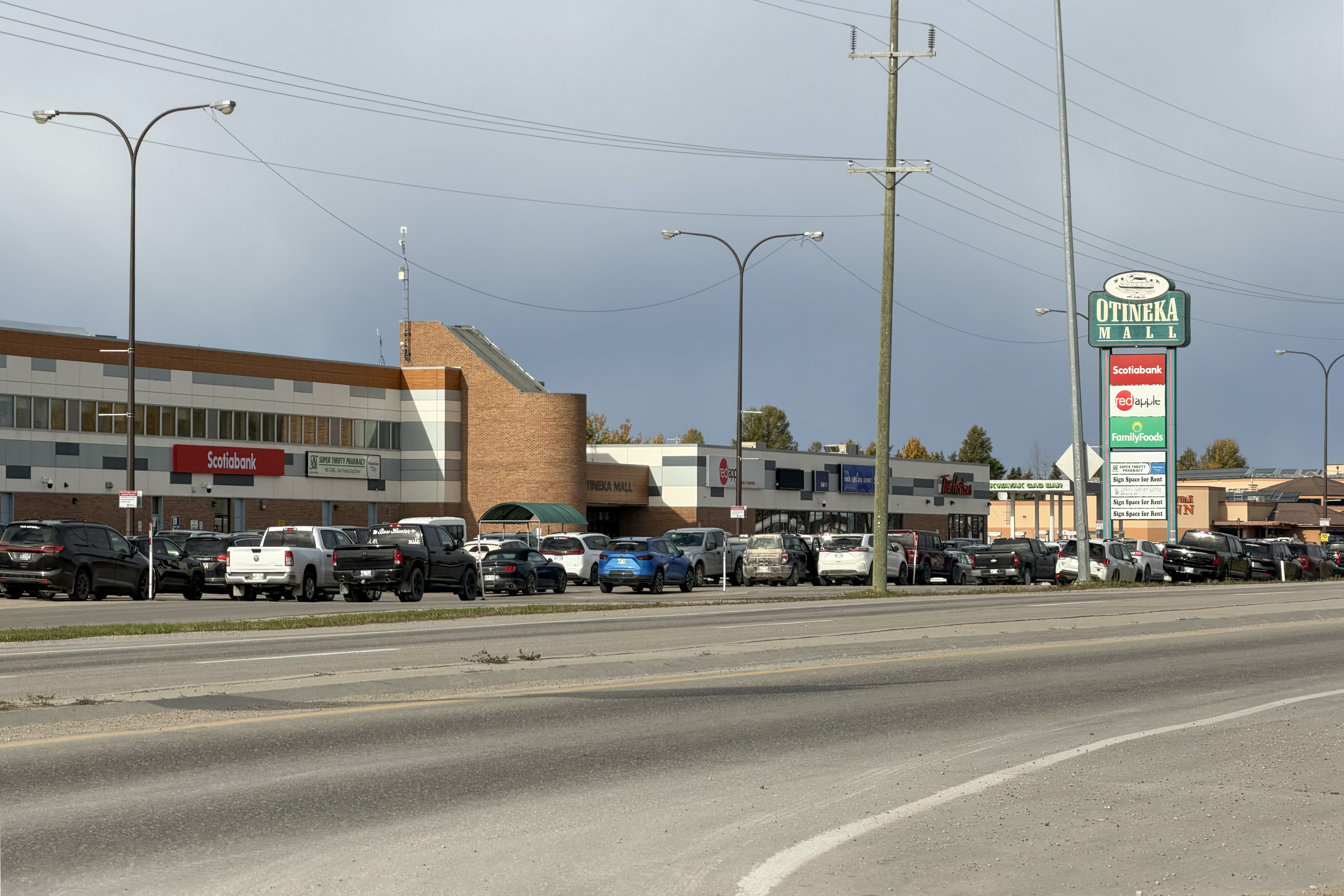
- Exterior, 2025
- Location: Opaskwayak Cree Nation, near The Pas, Manitoba, Canada
- Coordinates: 53.8341°N 101.2618°W
- Address: Highway 10 North, Opaskwayak Cree Nation
- Opened: October 1976
- Owner: Paskwayak Business Development Corporation
- Num. of stores: 25
- Floor area: 225,000 sq ft (20,900 m^{2})
- Floors: 3
- Website: otinekamall.ca

Otineka Mall is a 225,000 sq ft (20,900 m^{2}) shopping mall located in Opaskwayak Cree Nation, across the Saskatchewan River from The Pas, Manitoba, Canada. It is promoted as the largest mall in northern Manitoba and the region’s only enclosed mall.

== Background ==
Plans for what became Otineka Mall were developed in the early 1970s by leaders of the Opaskwayak Cree Nation, who sought to reduce retail “leakage” to nearby downtown The Pas by establishing a band-owned commercial centre. An initial concept for a small grocery store was expanded, with support from neighbouring northern First Nations, into a fully enclosed shopping mall. Despite opposition from merchants in The Pas and initial federal hesitation, the CA$8 million project was approved and the mall opened in October 1976.

The original complex contained about 225,000 sq ft (20,900 m^{2}) of space on roughly 13 acres (5.3 ha), planned as a regional shopping, recreation and service hub for Opaskwayak and surrounding northern communities. Early operating difficulties were attributed to limited management experience and challenges in attracting long-term tenants, but improved highway connections and a growing number of university-educated band members helped stabilise the mall by the early 1980s.

Otineka Mall later became part of the Paskwayak Business Development Corporation (PBDC), established in 1987 to consolidate Opaskwayak’s commercial enterprises. Through the 1990s and 2000s the mall underwent renovations aimed at revitalisation, retail recruitment and employment development.

Since the 2000s the complex has continued to adapt to changing retail conditions. The mall is marketed as a “one-stop shop” while also advertising spaces for lease, reflecting partial vacancy typical of small regional malls. A long-operated bowling alley had closed and its former space was being reused for community programmes such as income-assistance and identification clinics.
