= Walt Peacosh =

Canadian ice hockey player

- Born: September 16, 1935 (age 91) The Pas, Manitoba, Canada
- Died: July 23, 2017 (aged 81) Cranbrook, British Columbia, Canada
- Height: 5 ft 7 in (170 cm)
- Weight: 155 lb (70 kg; 11 st 1 lb)
- Position: Left wing
- Shot: Left
- Played for: Trail Smoke Eaters; Vancouver Canucks; Spokane Comets; Kimberley Dynamiters
- National team: Canada
- Playing career: 1953–1971
Medal record
Men's ice hockey
Gold medal – first place	1961 Switzerland	Ice hockey

Walt Peacosh (September 16, 1935 – July 23, 2017) was a Canadian ice hockey player. Peacosh was a member of the Trail Smoke Eaters who won a gold medal at the 1961 World Ice Hockey Championships in Switzerland. He also played professionally with the Spokane Comets and Vancouver Canucks.
