= Minister of Indigenous Reconciliation and Northern Relations (Manitoba) =

- Incumbent; Eileen Clarke since January 30, 2023
- Website: gov.mb.ca/minister/min_indigenous.html

The Minister of Indigenous Reconciliation and Northern Relations (French: Ministre des Réconciliation avec les Autochtones et des Relations avec le Nord) is the minister of the Manitoba government responsible for the provincial Department of Indigenous Reconciliation and Northern Relations.

The minister deals with issues related to Indigenous affairs and reconciliation in the province, and regional economic development in northern Manitoba.

== List of ministers ==
Name	Title	Party	Took office	Left office
Sterling Lyon	Minister of Tourism and Recreation Commission, Northern Affairs	PC	July 22, 1966	September 24, 1968
Obie Baizley	Minister of Municipal Affairs and Commissioner of Northern Affairs	PC	September 24, 1968	July 15, 1969
Ron McBryde	Minister of Northern Affairs	NDP	November 1, 1972	October 24, 1977
Ken MacMaster	Minister of Northern Affairs	PC	October 24, 1977	November 15, 1979
Douglas Gourlay	Minister of Northern Affairs	PC	November 15, 1979	November 30, 1981
Jay Cowan	Minister of Northern Affairs	NDP	November 30, 1981	November 4, 1983
Jerry Storie	Minister of Northern Affairs	NDP	November 4, 1983	January 30, 1985
Harry Harapiak	Minister of Northern Affairs	NDP	January 30, 1985	February 4, 1987
Elijah Harper (Native Affairs) (Note: Harper was Minister without portfolio responsible for Native Affairs from April 17, 1986 to February 4, 1987; then Minister of Northern Affairs and Communities Economic Development Fund Act from February 4, 1987 to September 9, 1987; and finally Minister of Northern Affairs and Minister responsible for Native Affairs from November 23, 1987 - May 9, 1988)	Minister responsible for Native Affairs	NDP	April 17, 1986	February 4, 1987
Elijah Harper (Native Affairs)	Minister of Northern Affairs	NDP	February 4, 1987	September 9, 1987
Jay Cowan (Native Affairs) (Note: Cowan's title was Minister of Native Affairs (without portfolio) responsible for Natural Gas Supply Act)	Minister responsible for Native Affairs	NDP	September 9, 1987	November 23, 1987
Elijah Harper	Minister of Northern Affairs Minister responsible for Native Affairs	NDP	November 23, 1987	May 9, 1988
James Downey	Minister of Northern Affairs Minister responsible for Native Affairs	PC	May 9, 1988	September 10, 1993
Darren Praznik	Minister of Northern Affairs Minister responsible for Native Affairs	PC	September 10, 1993	January 6, 1997
David Newman	Minister of Northern Affairs Minister responsible for Native Affairs	PC	January 6, 1997	October 5, 1999
Eric Robinson	Minister of Aboriginal and Northern Affairs	NDP	October 5, 1999	September 25, 2002
Oscar Lathlin	Minister of Aboriginal and Northern Affairs	NDP	September 25, 2002	November 1, 2008
Eric Robinson	Minister of Aboriginal and Northern Affairs	NDP	November 1, 2008	May 3, 2016
Eileen Clarke	Minister of Indigenous and Municipal Relations	PC	May 3, 2016	August 17, 2017
Eileen Clarke	Minister of Indigenous and Northern Relations	PC	August 17, 2017	July 9, 2021
Alan Lagimodiere	Minister of Indigenous Reconciliation and Northern Relations	PC	July 15, 2021	January 30, 2023
Eileen Clarke	Minister of Indigenous Reconciliation and Northern Relations	PC	January 30, 2023	incumbent

== See also ==
- Minister of Crown–Indigenous Relations
