= Robert Orok =

Canadian politician (1878–1957)

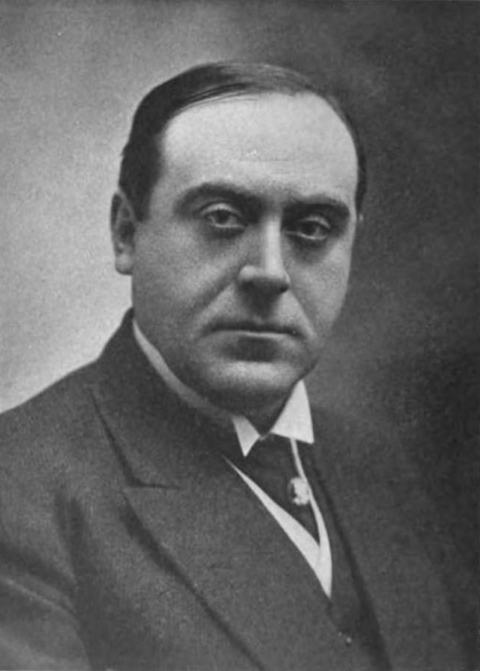

Member of the Legislative Assembly of Manitoba
- In office 1912–1915
- Constituency: The Pas

Personal details
- Born: Robert Dick Orok; October 2, 1878 Midhurst, Ontario
- Died: November 8, 1957 (aged 79) Midhurst, Ontario
- Party: Conservative
- Spouse: Bessie Vair (m. 1907)
- Education: University of Toronto; Queen's University; University of Edinburgh
- Occupation: Politician

Robert Dick Orok (October 2, 1878 – November 8, 1957) was a politician in Manitoba, Canada. He served in the Legislative Assembly of Manitoba from 1912 to 1915, as a member of the Conservative Party.

== Biography ==
Orok was born in Midhurst, Ontario, the son of William Orok and Mary Johnston. He was educated at the Barrie Collegiate Institute and the University of Toronto, and received a certification as a medical doctor. Orok pursued post-graduate studies at Queen's University and the University of Edinburgh. He spent time in the Yukon gold fields and then practised medicine in Cookstown, Ontario from 1909 to 1911 and, from 1911, at The Pas. He also worked as a surgeon on the Hudson Bay Railway. In religion, Orok was a Presbyterian. In 1904, he married Louise M. Smith. In 1907, Orork married Bessie Vair.

He was first elected to the Manitoba legislature in a by-election held on October 22, 1912, in the newly-created northern constituency of The Pas. The constituency occupied 200,000 square miles (520,000 km^{2}) at the time, and Orok claimed that it was the largest in the world. Orok won his seat by acclamation, and served as a backbench supporter of premier Rodmond Roblin's government. Orok was again returned by acclamation through a deferred vote in the 1914 election, after the Conservatives had won a majority government in the rest of the province.

Roblin's administration was forced to resign in 1915 amid a serious corruption scandal. A new election was held, which the Liberals won in a landslide. Orok did not seek re-election.

He served as a captain in the Canadian Army Medical Corps during World War I, mostly overseas.
