= IFSS On-Snow World Championships =

Sled dog racing event

- Status: Active
- Genre: sports competition
- Date: January–March
- Frequency: biannual
- Location: various
- Inaugurated: 1990
- Organiser: IFSS

The IFSS On-Snow World Championships are a biannual sled dog racing event organized by the International Federation of Sleddog Sports (IFSS). The On-Snow World Championships was started in 1990 and was first hosted in St. Moritz, Switzerland.

== Editions ==
Year	Location	Country
IFSS On-Snow World Championships
1990	St. Moritz	Switzerland
1991	Winnipeg	Canada
1992	Bad Mitterndorf	Austria
1993	Fairbanks	United States
1994	Todtmoos	Germany
1995	Lake Placid	United States
1997	Joensuu	Finland
1999	Sils im Engadin/Segl	Switzerland
2001	Fairbanks	United States
2003	Todtmoos / Bernau im Schwarzwald	Germany
2005	Dawson City	Canada
2007	Gafsele	Sweden
2008	Pian Cansiglio	Italy
2009	Daaquam	Canada
2011	Hamar	Norway
2013	Salcha / Fairbanks	United States
2015	Todtmoos / Bernau im Schwarzwald	Germany
2017	Haliburton Forest	Canada
2019	Bessans	France
2022	Hamar	Norway
