= The Pas (electoral district) =

Defunct provincial electoral district in Manitoba, Canada

Coordinates: 54.201°N 98.865°W

Manitoba electoral district
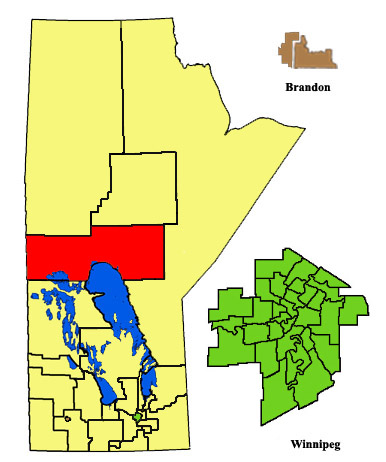

Defunct provincial electoral district
- Legislature: Legislative Assembly of Manitoba
- District created: 1912
- First contested: 1912
- Last contested: 2015

Demographics
- Census division(s): Division No. 21, Division No. 22
- Census subdivision(s): Cross Lake 19, Division No. 21, Unorganized, Division No. 22, Unorganized, Kelsey, Moose Lake 31A, Norway House 17, Opaskwayak Cree Nation 21, The Pas

The Pas was a provincial electoral district in north-central Manitoba, Canada. It was created in 1912 following the expansion of the province's northern border, and existed until its dissolution in 2018. It was named for the rural town of The Pas.

Until the 1960s, elections in The Pas were deferred until a few weeks after the rest of the province for logistical reasons. It was not unheard of for politicians from the south of the province to run in The Pas after being chosen as cabinet ministers by newly elected provincial governments; Edward Brown and John Bracken were both elected in this manner.

Located in the north of the province, The Pas was bordered by the riding of Rupertsland to the east and south, Thompson and Flin Flon to the north, Swan River and Lake Winnipeg to the south, and the province of Saskatchewan to the west. In addition to the Town of The Pas, it also included Easterville and Norway House.

The Pas was represented by candidates of the New Democratic Party from 1969 onward (and for all but 11 years since 1943), and for much of that time was considered safe for the party. Its last three MLAs—Oscar Lathlin, Frank Whitehead, and Oscar's daughter Amanda Lathlin—were all Indigenous. Whitehead had previously won a by-election on March 24, 2009, following Oscar Lathlin's death. He held it until his resignation in 2014, and Amanda Lathlin won the ensuing by-election.

Following the 2018 redistribution, the riding was abolished, and its area was re-distributed into The Pas-Kameesak, Flin Flon and Keewatinook ridings. Amanda Lathlin transferred to The Pas-Kameesak.

== Demographics ==
The riding's population in 1996 was 19,449. In 1999, the average family income was $42,878, and the unemployment rate was 17.80%. Health and social services account for 14% of the riding's economy, with retail trade accounting for another 14%.

Sixty-seven per cent of the riding's residents are aboriginal, the second-highest rate in the province.

== Members of the Legislative Assembly ==
Name	Party	Took office	Left office
Robert Orok	Conservative	1912	1915
Edward Brown	Liberal	1915	1922
John Bracken	Progressive	1922	1932
	Liberal-Progressive	1932	1943
Beresford Richards	Co-operative Commonwealth	1943	1945
	Independent CCF	1945	1945
	Co-operative Commonwealth	1945	1949
	Independent CCF	1949	1949
Francis Bud Jobin	Liberal-Progressive	1949	1958
John Carroll	Progressive Conservative	1958	1969
Ron McBryde	New Democrat	1969	1977
Harry Harapiak	New Democrat	1977	1990
Oscar Lathlin	New Democrat	1990	2008
Frank Whitehead	New Democrat	2009	2014
Amanda Lathlin	New Democrat	2015	2019

== Electoral results ==
=== 1912 by-election ===
Manitoba provincial by-election, October 22, 1912
Party	Candidate	Votes
Conservative	Robert Orok	Acclaimed
Source(s) Source: https://www.mhs.mb.ca/docs/events/provincialbyelection1913.shtml

=== 1914 ===
1914 Manitoba general election
Party	Candidate	Votes
Conservative	Robert Orok	Acclaimed
Eligible voters		1,919
Source(s) Source: Manitoba. Chief Electoral Officer (1999). Statement of Votes for the 37th Provincial General Election, September 21, 1999 (PDF) (Report). Winnipeg: Elections Manitoba.

=== 1915 ===
1915 Manitoba general election
Party	Candidate	Votes
Liberal	Edward Brown	Acclaimed
Eligible voters		736
Source(s) Source: Manitoba. Chief Electoral Officer (1999). Statement of Votes for the 37th Provincial General Election, September 21, 1999 (PDF) (Report). Winnipeg: Elections Manitoba.

=== 1920 ===
1920 Manitoba general election
Party	Candidate	Votes	%
Liberal	Edward Brown	560	81.63
Labour	Allan Norgrove	126	18.37
Total valid votes		686	–
Eligible voters / Turnout		1,006	68.19
Source(s) Source: Manitoba. Chief Electoral Officer (1999). Statement of Votes for the 37th Provincial General Election, September 21, 1999 (PDF) (Report). Winnipeg: Elections Manitoba.

=== 1922 ===
1922 Manitoba general election
Party	Candidate	Votes	%	±%
United Farmers	John Bracken	472	67.53	–
Independent	Herman Finger	118	16.88	–
Independent	Peter Cecil Robertson	71	10.16	–
Independent	R. H. MacNeill	38	5.44	–
Total valid votes		699	–	–
Eligible voters / Turnout		1,355	51.59	-16.60
United Farmers gain from Liberal		Swing		+74.58
Source(s) Source: Manitoba. Chief Electoral Officer (1999). Statement of Votes for the 37th Provincial General Election, September 21, 1999 (PDF) (Report). Winnipeg: Elections Manitoba.

=== 1927 ===
1927 Manitoba general election
Party	Candidate	Votes	%	±%
Progressive	John Bracken	582	56.18	-11.35
Liberal	Stephan Stephansson	454	43.82	–
Total valid votes		1,036	–	–
Eligible voters / Turnout		1,375	75.35	+23.76
Progressive hold		Swing		-27.58
Source(s) Source: Manitoba. Chief Electoral Officer (1999). Statement of Votes for the 37th Provincial General Election, September 21, 1999 (PDF) (Report). Winnipeg: Elections Manitoba.

=== 1932 ===
1932 Manitoba general election
Party	Candidate	Votes	%	±%
Liberal–Progressive	John Bracken	1,915	60.60	+4.42
Labour	N. S. McDonald	1,072	33.92	–
Independent Conservative	Harold Frederick Maulson	173	5.47	–
Total valid votes		3,159	–	–
Eligible voters / Turnout		4,825	65.49	-9.85
Liberal–Progressive hold		Swing		-14.75
Source(s) Source: Manitoba. Chief Electoral Officer (1999). Statement of Votes for the 37th Provincial General Election, September 21, 1999 (PDF) (Report). Winnipeg: Elections Manitoba.

=== 1936 ===
1936 Manitoba general election
Party	Candidate	Votes	%	±%
Liberal–Progressive	John Bracken	2,968	60.30	-0.30
Conservative	George Baskerville Mainwaring	1,954	39.70	–
Total valid votes		4,922	97.60	–
Rejected		121	2.40	
Turnout		5,043	72.98	+7.49
Eligible voters		6,910		
Liberal–Progressive hold		Swing		-20.00
Source(s) Source: Manitoba. Chief Electoral Officer (1999). Statement of Votes for the 37th Provincial General Election, September 21, 1999 (PDF) (Report). Winnipeg: Elections Manitoba.

=== 1941 ===
1941 Manitoba general election
Party	Candidate	Votes
Liberal–Progressive	John Bracken	Acclaimed
Eligible voters		8,819
Source(s) Source: Manitoba. Chief Electoral Officer (1999). Statement of Votes for the 37th Provincial General Election, September 21, 1999 (PDF) (Report). Winnipeg: Elections Manitoba.

=== 1943 by-election ===
Manitoba provincial by-election, August 17, 1943 Resignation of John Bracken
Party	Candidate	Votes	%
Co-operative Commonwealth	Beresford Richards	3,504	61.15
Coalition (?)	R. M. McIsaac	1,270	22.16
Liberal	Orson F. Wright	526	9.18
Conservative	George Baskerville Mainwaring	430	7.50
Total valid votes		5,730	–
Source(s) Source: Gordon Goldsborough (September 30, 2023). "Events in Manitoba History: Manitoba Provincial By-Elections (1943)". Manitoba Historical Society Archives.

=== 1945 ===
1945 Manitoba general election
Party	Candidate	Votes	%	±%
Independent Co-operative Commonwealth	Beresford Richards	2,840	50.72	-10.43
Progressive Conservative	Robert Franklin Milton	2,759	49.28	+41.77
Total valid votes		5,599	98.80	–
Rejected		68	1.20	
Turnout		5,667	72.14	
Eligible voters		7,856		
Independent Co-operative Commonwealth hold		Swing		-26.10
Source(s) Source: Manitoba. Chief Electoral Officer (1999). Statement of Votes for the 37th Provincial General Election, September 21, 1999 (PDF) (Report). Winnipeg: Elections Manitoba.

=== 1949 ===
1949 Manitoba general election
Party	Candidate	Votes	%	±%
Liberal	Francis Lawrence Jobin	4,311	64.84	+15.56
Independent	Beresford Richards	1,522	22.89	-12.83
Co-operative Commonwealth	Gordon Murray Ferg	816	12.27	
Total valid votes		6,649	98.64	–
Rejected		92	1.36	+0.16
Turnout		6,741	61.10	-11.04
Eligible voters		11,033		
Liberal gain from Independent (CCF)		Swing		+21.70
Source(s) Source: Manitoba. Chief Electoral Officer (1999). Statement of Votes for the 37th Provincial General Election, September 21, 1999 (PDF) (Report). Winnipeg: Elections Manitoba.
Liberal change is calculated from Progressive Conservative (both parties were in a coalition)

=== 1953 ===
1953 Manitoba general election
Party	Candidate	Votes	%	±%
Liberal–Progressive	Francis Lawrence Jobin	4,875	60.42	-4.42
Social Credit	William Henry Calvert	1,668	20.67	–
Co-operative Commonwealth	Walter Arthur Thompson	1,526	18.91	+6.64
Total valid votes		8,069	97.85	–
Rejected		177	2.15	+0.78
Turnout		8,246	61.42	+0.32
Eligible voters		13,425		
Liberal–Progressive hold		Swing		-12.55
Source(s) Source: Manitoba. Chief Electoral Officer (1999). Statement of Votes for the 37th Provincial General Election, September 21, 1999 (PDF) (Report). Winnipeg: Elections Manitoba.

=== 1958 ===
1958 Manitoba general election
Party	Candidate	Votes	%	±%
Progressive Conservative	John Carroll	2,325	57.78	–
Liberal–Progressive	Wilfred E. Cudmore	898	22.32	-38.10
Co-operative Commonwealth	Howard Pawley	801	19.91	+0.99
Total valid votes		4,024	99.02	–
Rejected		40	0.98	-1.16
Turnout		4,064	68.51	+7.09
Eligible voters		5,932		
Progressive Conservative gain from Liberal–Progressive		Swing		+47.94
Source(s) Source: Manitoba. Chief Electoral Officer (1999). Statement of Votes for the 37th Provincial General Election, September 21, 1999 (PDF) (Report). Winnipeg: Elections Manitoba.

=== 1959 ===
1959 Manitoba general election
Party	Candidate	Votes	%	±%
Progressive Conservative	John Carroll	2,345	56.49	-1.29
Liberal–Progressive	Mervin Hill	1,027	24.74	+2.42
Co-operative Commonwealth	Peter Shewchuk	779	18.77	-1.14
Total valid votes		4,151	99.33	–
Rejected		28	0.67	-0.31
Turnout		4,179	70.24	+1.73
Eligible voters		5,950		
Progressive Conservative hold		Swing		-1.86
Source(s) Source: Manitoba. Chief Electoral Officer (1999). Statement of Votes for the 37th Provincial General Election, September 21, 1999 (PDF) (Report). Winnipeg: Elections Manitoba.

=== 1962 ===
1962 Manitoba general election
Party	Candidate	Votes	%	±%
Progressive Conservative	John Carroll	2,484	56.31	-0.18
Liberal	Adam Deminick	1,497	33.94	+9.20
New Democratic	Rachel Shewchuk	430	9.75	-9.02
Total valid votes		4,411	99.01	–
Rejected		44	0.99	
Turnout		4,455	69.63	-0.60
Eligible voters		6,398		
Progressive Conservative hold		Swing		-4.69
Source(s) Source: Manitoba. Chief Electoral Officer (1999). Statement of Votes for the 37th Provincial General Election, September 21, 1999 (PDF) (Report). Winnipeg: Elections Manitoba.

=== 1966 ===
1966 Manitoba general election
Party	Candidate	Votes	%	±%
Progressive Conservative	John Carroll	2,278	52.55	-3.76
Liberal	Calvin D. Gibson	1,769	40.81	+6.87
New Democratic	Glen F. Allen	288	6.64	-3.10
Total valid votes		4,335	99.63	–
Rejected		16	0.37	-0.62
Turnout		4,351	68.87	-0.76
Eligible voters		6,318		
Progressive Conservative hold		Swing		-5.32
Source(s) Source: Manitoba. Chief Electoral Officer (1999). Statement of Votes for the 37th Provincial General Election, September 21, 1999 (PDF) (Report). Winnipeg: Elections Manitoba.

=== 1969 ===
1969 Manitoba general election
Party	Candidate	Votes	%	±%
New Democratic	Ron McBryde	1,556	40.10	+33.46
Progressive Conservative	John Carroll	1,361	35.08	-17.47
Liberal	Calvert D. Gibson	963	24.82	-15.99
Total valid votes		3,880	99.26	–
Rejected		29	0.74	+0.37
Turnout		3,909	66.10	-2.77
Eligible voters		5,914		
New Democratic gain from Progressive Conservative		Swing		+25.47
Source(s) Source: Manitoba. Chief Electoral Officer (1999). Statement of Votes for the 37th Provincial General Election, September 21, 1999 (PDF) (Report). Winnipeg: Elections Manitoba.

=== 1973 ===
1973 Manitoba general election
Party	Candidate	Votes	%	±%
New Democratic	Ron McBryde	3,673	66.23	+26.12
Independent	George Takashima	1,873	33.77	–
Total valid votes		5,546	99.00	–
Rejected		56	1.00	+0.26
Turnout		5,602	69.26	+3.17
Eligible voters		8,088		
New Democratic hold		Swing		-3.82
Source(s) Source: Manitoba. Chief Electoral Officer (1999). Statement of Votes for the 37th Provincial General Election, September 21, 1999 (PDF) (Report). Winnipeg: Elections Manitoba.

=== 1977 ===
1977 Manitoba general election
Party	Candidate	Votes	%	±%
New Democratic	Ron McBryde	3,471	56.44	-9.79
Progressive Conservative	Percy Pielak	1,965	31.95	–
Liberal	Edwin Jebb	714	11.61	–
Total valid votes		6,150	99.66	–
Rejected		21	0.34	-0.66
Turnout		6,171	69.27	+0.00
Eligible voters		8,909		
New Democratic hold		Swing		-20.87
Source(s) Source: Manitoba. Chief Electoral Officer (1999). Statement of Votes for the 37th Provincial General Election, September 21, 1999 (PDF) (Report). Winnipeg: Elections Manitoba.

=== 1981 ===
1981 Manitoba general election
Party	Candidate	Votes	%	±%
New Democratic	Harry Harapiak	4,236	70.04	+13.60
Progressive Conservative	Percy Pielak	1,303	21.54	-10.41
Liberal	Laverne Jaeb	509	8.42	-3.19
Total valid votes		6,048	99.20	–
Rejected		49	0.80	+0.46
Turnout		6,097	73.89	+4.62
Eligible voters		8,252		
New Democratic hold		Swing		+12.00
Source(s) Source: Manitoba. Chief Electoral Officer (1999). Statement of Votes for the 37th Provincial General Election, September 21, 1999 (PDF) (Report). Winnipeg: Elections Manitoba.

=== 1986 ===
1986 Manitoba general election
Party	Candidate	Votes	%	±%
New Democratic	Harry Harapiak	4,051	68.34	-1.70
Progressive Conservative	Ernest Polsom	1,088	18.35	-3.19
Liberal	Scott Gray	789	13.31	+4.89
Total valid votes		5,928	99.71	–
Rejected		17	0.29	-0.52
Turnout		5,945	68.18	-5.71
Eligible voters		8,720		
New Democratic hold		Swing		+0.74
Source(s) Source: Manitoba. Chief Electoral Officer (1999). Statement of Votes for the 37th Provincial General Election, September 21, 1999 (PDF) (Report). Winnipeg: Elections Manitoba.

=== 1988 ===
1988 Manitoba general election
Party	Candidate	Votes	%	±%
New Democratic	Harry Harapiak	3,221	51.69	-16.64
Progressive Conservative	Bruce Unfried	1,584	25.42	+7.07
Liberal	Scott Gray	1,426	22.89	+9.58
Total valid votes		6,231	99.73	–
Rejected		17	0.27	-0.01
Turnout		6,248	73.08	+4.90
Eligible voters		8,550		
New Democratic hold		Swing		-11.86
Source(s) Source: Manitoba. Chief Electoral Officer (1999). Statement of Votes for the 37th Provincial General Election, September 21, 1999 (PDF) (Report). Winnipeg: Elections Manitoba.

=== 1990 ===
1990 Manitoba general election
Party	Candidate	Votes	%	±%
New Democratic	Oscar Lathlin	3,390	44.36	-7.33
Progressive Conservative	Alfred McDonald	3,247	42.49	+17.07
Liberal	David Merasty	1,005	13.15	-9.73
Total valid votes		7,642	99.65	–
Rejected		21	0.27	+0.00
Turnout		7,663	63.56	-9.51
Eligible voters		12,056		
New Democratic hold		Swing		-12.20
Source(s) Source: Manitoba. Chief Electoral Officer (1999). Statement of Votes for the 37th Provincial General Election, September 21, 1999 (PDF) (Report). Winnipeg: Elections Manitoba.

=== 1995 ===
1995 Manitoba general election
Party	Candidate	Votes	%	±%
New Democratic	Oscar Lathlin	3,616	51.70	+7.34
Progressive Conservative	Alfred MacDonald	2,501	35.76	-6.73
Liberal	Clem Jones	877	12.54	-0.61
Total valid votes		6,994	99.62	–
Rejected		27	0.38	+0.11
Turnout		7,021	58.24	-7.53
Eligible voters		12,056		
New Democratic hold		Swing		+7.04
Source(s) Source: Manitoba. Chief Electoral Officer (1999). Statement of Votes for the 37th Provincial General Election, September 21, 1999 (PDF) (Report). Winnipeg: Elections Manitoba.

=== 1999 ===
1999 Manitoba general election
Party	Candidate	Votes	%	±%
New Democratic	Oscar Lathlin	2,952	46.85	-4.85
Progressive Conservative	Ron Evans	2,737	43.44	+7.68
Liberal	Don Sandberg	612	9.71	-2.83
Total valid votes		6,301	98.42	–
Rejected		101	1.58	+1.19
Turnout		6,402	51.72	-6.51
Eligible voters		12,377		
New Democratic hold		Swing		-6.27
Source(s) Source: Manitoba. Chief Electoral Officer (1999). Statement of Votes for the 37th Provincial General Election, September 21, 1999 (PDF) (Report). Winnipeg: Elections Manitoba.

=== 2003 ===
2003 Manitoba general election
Party	Candidate	Votes	%	±%	Expenditures
New Democratic	Oscar Lathlin	3,104	65.61	+18.76	$18,254.02
Liberal	Mark Sweeny	836	17.67	+7.96	$6,302.87
Progressive Conservative	Richard Goudry	791	16.72	-26.72	$4,258.53
Total valid votes		4,731	99.60	–	
Rejected		19	0.40	-1.18	
Turnout		4,750	40.46	-11.26	
Eligible voters		11,739			
New Democratic hold		Swing		+5.40	
Source(s) Source: Manitoba. Chief Electoral Officer (2003). Statement of Votes for the 38th Provincial General Election, June 3, 2003 (PDF) (Report). Winnipeg: Elections Manitoba.

=== 2007 ===
2007 Manitoba general election
Party	Candidate	Votes	%	±%	Expenditures
New Democratic	Oscar Lathlin	3,262	68.86	+3.25	$22,521.26
Progressive Conservative	George Muswaggon	1,016	21.45	+4.73	$7,505.06
Liberal	James Houston	459	9.69	-7.98	$224.51
Total valid votes		4,737	99.18	–	
Rejected		39	0.82	+0.42	
Turnout		4,776	36.63	-3.84	
Eligible voters		13,040			
New Democratic hold		Swing		-0.74	
Source(s) Source: Manitoba. Chief Electoral Officer (2007). Statement of Votes for the 39th Provincial General Election, May 22, 2007 (PDF) (Report). Winnipeg: Elections Manitoba.

=== 2009 by-election ===
Manitoba provincial by-election, March 24, 2009 Death of Oscar Lathlin
Party	Candidate	Votes	%	±%	Expenditures
New Democratic	Frank Whitehead	2,949	75.11	+6.25	25,898.41
Progressive Conservative	Edna Nabess	722	18.39	-3.06	31,676.75
Liberal	Maurice Berens	255	6.50	-3.19	9,255.99
Total valid votes		3,926	99.32	–	
Rejected		27	0.68	-0.13	
Turnout		3,953	29.65	-6.98	
Eligible voters		13,334			
New Democratic hold		Swing		+4.66	
Source(s) Source: "2009 The Pas Byelection Results" (PDF). Elections Manitoba.

=== 2011 ===
2011 Manitoba general election
Party	Candidate	Votes	%	±%	Expenditures
New Democratic	Frank Whitehead	2,995	73.61	-1.51	$20,683.92
Progressive Conservative	Alfred McDonald	959	23.57	+5.18	$ 5,562.86
Liberal	Girma Tessema	115	2.83	-3.67	$ 0.00
Total valid votes		4,069	99.46	–	
Rejected		22	0.54	-0.15	
Turnout		4,091	30.40	+0.75	
Eligible voters		13,459			
New Democratic hold		Swing		−3.34	
Source(s) Source: Manitoba. Chief Electoral Officer (2011). Statement of Votes for the 40th Provincial General Election, October 4, 2011 (PDF) (Report). Winnipeg: Elections Manitoba.

=== 2015 by-election ===
Manitoba provincial by-election, April 21, 2015 Resignation of Frank Whitehead
Party	Candidate	Votes	%	±%	Expenditures
New Democratic	Amanda Lathlin	1,557	56.76	-16.84	$26,202.75
Progressive Conservative	Jacob Nasekapow	817	29.78	+6.22	$31,878.68
Liberal	Inez Vystrcil-Spence	369	13.45	+10.63	$2,941.26
Total valid votes		2,743	99.42	–	
Rejected		16	0.58	+0.04	
Turnout		2,759	21.04	-9.35	
Eligible voters		13,111			
New Democratic hold		Swing		-11.53	
Source(s) Source: Elections Manitoba

=== 2016 ===
2016 Manitoba general election
Party	Candidate	Votes	%	±%	Expenditures
New Democratic	Amanda Lathlin	1,976	43.49	-13.28	$26,898.08
Progressive Conservative	Doug Lauvstad	1,765	38.84	+9.06	$14,083.14
Liberal	Tyler Duncan	586	12.90	-0.56	$2,326.92
Green	Patrick Wood	217	4.78	–	$33.78
Total valid votes		4,544	99.45	–	
Rejected		25	0.55	-0.03	
Turnout		4,569	30.70	+9.66	
Eligible voters		14,883			
New Democratic hold		Swing		-11.17	
Source(s) Source: Manitoba. Chief Electoral Officer (2016). Statement of Votes for the 41st Provincial General Election, April 19, 2016 (PDF) (Report). Winnipeg: Elections Manitoba. "Election Returns: 41st General Election". Elections Manitoba. 2016.

== Previous boundaries ==
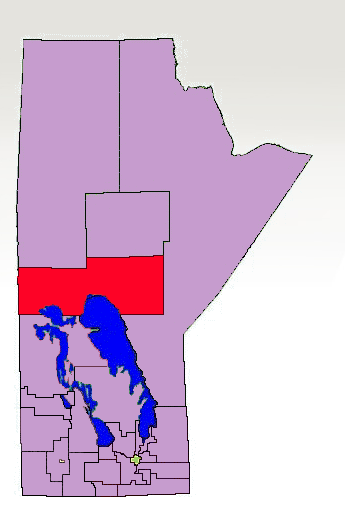
The 1998–2011 boundaries for The Pas highlighted in red.

== See also ==
- List of Manitoba provincial electoral districts
- Canadian provincial electoral districts
