= Christine Harapiak =

Canadian judge

Christine Harapiak, from Dauphin, Manitoba, was appointed to the Provincial Court of Manitoba on April 13, 2005.

Judge Harapiak graduated from the Faculty of Law at the University of Manitoba in 1994 and began practice in the private sector. From 1995 to 2000, she worked at Hawkins & Sanderson in Dauphin. She was later employed in the public sector by the Manitoba Justice Family Law Branch and Justice Canada's Aboriginal Law Services. From 2003 until her appointment to the bench, she practiced both traditional litigation and alternative dispute resolution with the federal government. Judge Harapiak was originally from The Pas, Manitoba and is the daughter of Harry Harapiak, NDP MLA for The Pas Constituency from 1981 - 1990 and cabinet minister in the Howard Pawley Administration.
