= John Carroll (Manitoba politician) =

Canadian politician

Member of the Legislative Assembly of Manitoba for The Pas
- In office 1958–1969
- Preceded by: Francis Lawrence Jobin
- Succeeded by: Ron McBryde

Personal details
- Born: October 13, 1921 The Pas, Manitoba, Canada
- Died: September 25, 1986 (aged 64) Vancouver, British Columbia, Canada
- Party: Progressive Conservative Party of Manitoba

John Benson Carroll (October 13, 1921 – September 25, 1986) was a politician in Manitoba, Canada. He was a Progressive Conservative member of the Legislative Assembly of Manitoba from 1958 to 1969, and served as a cabinet minister in the governments of Dufferin Roblin and Walter Weir.

Carroll received a Bachelor of Commerce degree from the University of Manitoba. He served in the Canadian Army from 1942 to 1945, reaching the rank of Lieutenant.

He was first elected to the Manitoba legislature in the 1958 provincial election, in the northern riding of The Pas. Carroll won a landslide victory over his two opponents; the third place candidate was future Premier of Manitoba Howard Pawley, representing the CCF. The Progressive Conservatives formed a minority government after this election, and Carroll was appointed Minister of Public Utilities on June 30, 1958.

He was easily re-elected in the 1959 provincial election, in which the Progressive Conservatives won a legislative majority. Carroll was retained in the Public Utilities portfolio, and also served as Provincial Secretary from October 1 to December 21, 1959. He was named Minister of Labour on December 21, and was relieved of the Public Utilities portfolio on October 31, 1961.

Carroll was re-elected again 1962 election, and was named Minister of Welfare on February 27, 1963. He was retained in this portfolio after Walter Weir replaced Dufferin Roblin as Premier in 1967. On September 24, 1968, he returned to his former positions of Provincial Secretary and Minister of Public Utilities, and was also named Minister of Tourism and Recreation. He announced that he would create the position of a provincial ombudsman in 1969, although the Weir government was voted out of office before he could follow through on this pledge.

He was narrowly defeated by Ron McBryde of the NDP in the 1969 election, losing by 195 votes. He died in Vancouver, British Columbia in 1986.
