= 2022 IFSS On-Snow World Championships =

Sled dog racing event

The 2022 IFSS On-Snow World Championships were held in Hamar, Norway from February 23 to February 27, 2022.

== Medal summary ==
=== Men ===
Event	Gold	Silver	Bronze
1-dog skijoring	Pekka Niemi (FIN)	Ondřej Exler (CZE)	Trond Are Hoel (NOR)
2-dog skijoring	Vesa-Pekka Jurvelin (FIN)	Pavel Pischek (CZE)	Ondřej Exler (CZE)
1-dog pulka	Trond Are Hoel (NOR)	Yngve Hoel (NOR)	Vesa-Pekka Jurvelin (FIN)
Combined	Trond Are Hoel (NOR)	Viktor Sinding-Larsen (NOR)	Vesa-Pekka Jurvelin (FIN)

=== Women ===
Event	Gold	Silver	Bronze
1-dog skijoring	Jessica Häggqvist (SWE)	Jana Draslarová (CZE)	Martina Štěpánková (CZE)
2-dog skijoring	Mirelle Andersson (SWE)	Agnieszka Jarecka (POL)	Jessica Häggqvist (SWE)
1-dog pulka	Jessica Häggqvist (SWE)	Saara Loukkola (FIN)	Helene Myhrberg (SWE)
Combined	Marte Eiring Solhaug (NOR)	Jessica Häggqvist (SWE)	Mirelle Andersson (SWE)

=== Mixed ===
Event	Gold	Silver	Bronze
2-dog sprint	Viktor Sinding-Larsen (NOR)	Hana Štípalová (CZE)	Marie Ševelová (CZE)
4-dog sprint	Andrej Drabik (SVK)	Indrė Daujotienė (LTU)	Jiří Suchý (CZE)
4-dog sprint mass start	Andrej Drabik (SVK)	Jiří Suchý (CZE)	Indrė Daujotienė (LTU)
6-dog sprint	Renata Válková (CZE)	Uwe Radant (GER)	Václav Vančura (CZE)
8-dog sprint	Ole Petter Engli (NOR)	Pasi Heinonen (FIN)	Martin Vrtel (CZE)
Unlimited sprint	Hege Ingebrigtsen (NOR)	Kjetil Hillestad (NOR)	Rune Haugmo (NOR)
6-dog mid-distance	Iker Ozkoidi (ESP)	Aurélie Delattre (FRA)	Hans Lindahl (NOR)
12-dog mid-distance	Rémy Coste (FRA)	Martin Dickel (GER)	Sissel Wolf Mølmen (NOR)
Relay	Czech Republic (CZE); Ondřej Exler; Hana Štípalová; Jiří Suchý	Norway (NOR); Trond Are Hoel; Oda Foss Almqvist; André Boysen Hillestad	Czech Republic (CZE) 2 Kryštof Spilka; Marie Ševelová; Michal Ženíšek

== Medals table ==
* Host nation (Norway)

Rank	Nation	Gold	Silver	Bronze	Total
1	Norway (NOR)*	6	4	4	14
2	Sweden (SWE)	3	1	3	7
3	Czech Republic (CZE)	2	5	7	14
4	Finland (FIN)	2	2	2	6
5	Slovakia (SVK)	2	0	0	2
6	France (FRA)	1	1	0	2
7	Spain (ESP)	1	0	0	1
8	Germany (GER)	0	2	0	2
9	Lithuania (LTU)	0	1	1	2
10	Poland (POL)	0	1	0	1
Totals (10 entries)		17	17	17	51
