= The Pas =

Town in Manitoba, Canada

The Pas Le Pas
- Town
- Town of The Pas
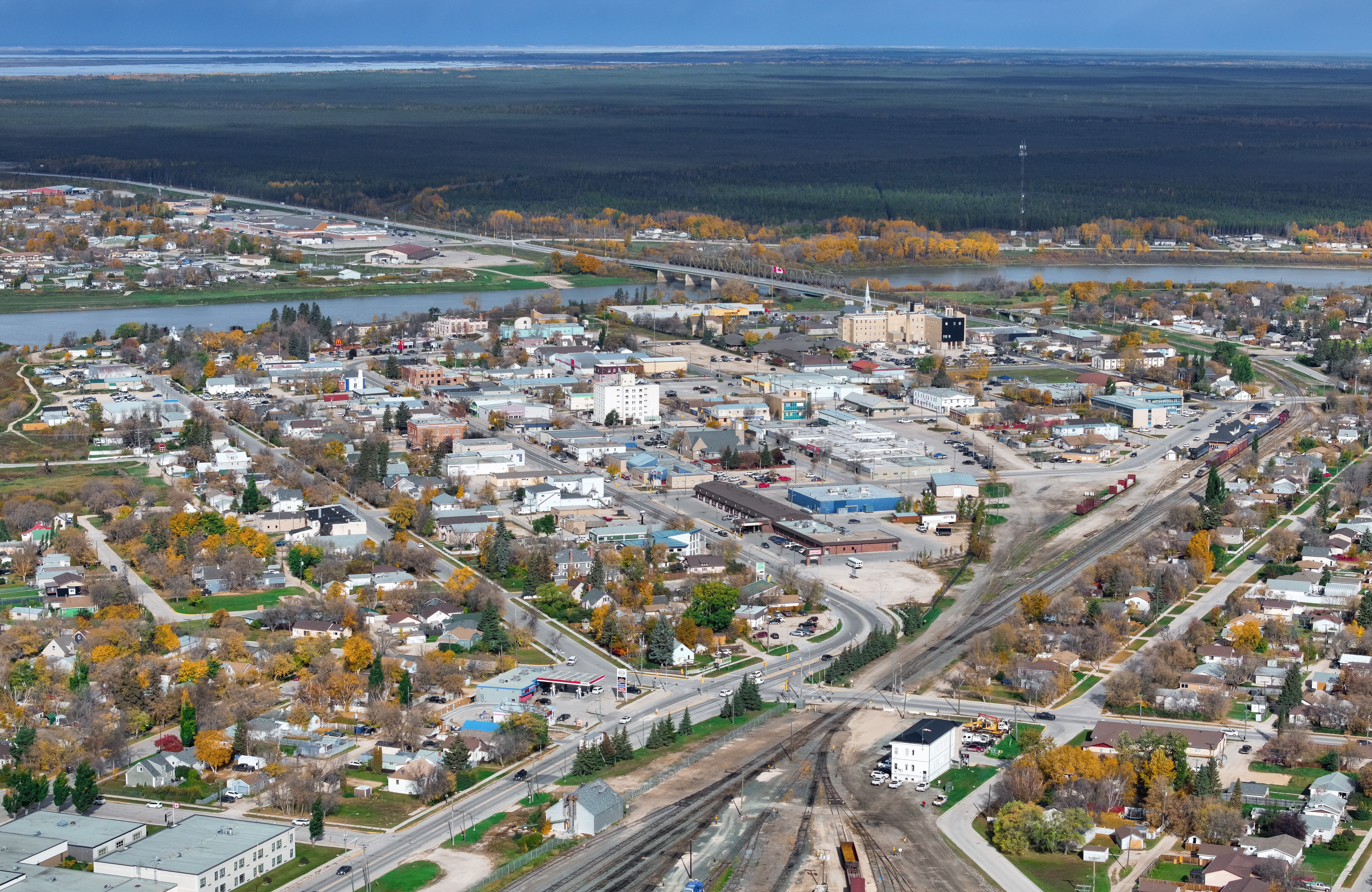
- Aerial view

- Seal Logo
- Motto: Adventure Territory
- Location within Manitoba Location within Canada
- Coordinates: 53°49′30″N 101°15′12″W
- Country: Canada
- Province: Manitoba
- Region: Northern Region
- Census division: 21
- Incorporated (town): 1912

Government
  - Mayor: Andre Murphy
  - MLA: Jennifer Flett

Area
  - Land: 47.83 km^{2} (18.47 sq mi)
  - Urban: 14.15 km^{2} (5.46 sq mi)
- Elevation: 271 m (889 ft)

Population (2011)
  - Town: 5,513
  - Density: 115.3/km^{2} (299/sq mi)
  - Urban: 5,689
  - Urban density: 402.1/km^{2} (1,041/sq mi)
- Time zone: UTC−06:00 (CST)
  - Summer (DST): UTC−05:00 (CDT)
- Forward sortation area: R9A
- Area code: 204

The Pas (/pɑː/ PAH; French: Le Pas) is a town in Manitoba, Canada, at the confluence of the Pasquia River and the Saskatchewan River and surrounded by the unorganized Northern Region of the province. It is approximately 520 kilometres (320 mi) northwest of the provincial capital, Winnipeg, and 35 kilometres (22 mi) from the border of Saskatchewan. It is sometimes still called Paskoyac by locals after the first trading post, called Fort Paskoya, constructed in the 1740s by French and Canadian traders. The Pasquia River begins in the Pasquia Hills in east central Saskatchewan. The French in 1795 knew the river as Basquiau.

Known as "The Gateway to the North", The Pas is a multi-industry northern Manitoba town serving the surrounding region. The main components of the region's economy are agriculture, forestry, commercial fishing, tourism, transportation, and services (especially health and education). The main employer is a paper mill operated by Canadian Kraft Paper Industries Ltd. The Pas contains one of the two main campuses of the University College of the North. Across the river on the neighbouring Opaskwayak Cree Nation, the Otineka Mall serves as the area's principal enclosed shopping centre.

The Pas is bordered by the Rural Municipality of Kelsey, as well as part of the Opaskwayak Cree Nation.

== History ==
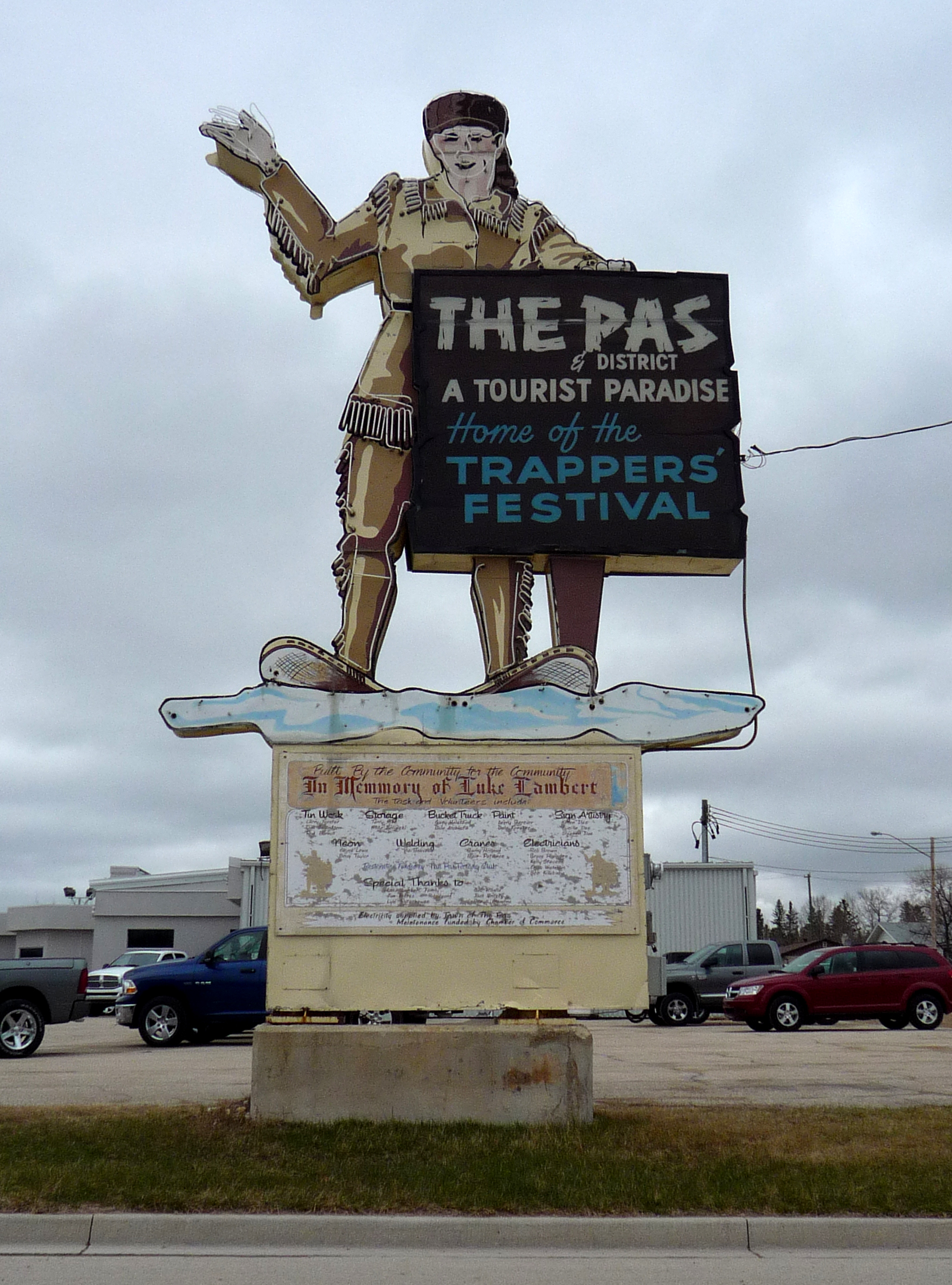
Welcome sign

The area's original inhabitants are the Swampy Cree.

The first European recorded to encounter the Cree was Henry Kelsey, an employee of the Hudson's Bay Company. He travelled through the area between 1690 and 1692 on his way to the Canadian prairies.

During the years of New France, La Vérendrye, the first western military commander, directed the construction of Fort Paskoya near here. It was named after the people of the Pasquia River. For years the settlement was called Pascoyac, sometimes shortened to Le Pas.

In 1904, The Pas Indian Band set up a sawmill on Mission Island in the Saskatchewan River. Soon after, the band was forced to surrender their reserve lands south of the river, including the areas around the site of the Hudson's Bay Company trading post and the Anglican Church Mission, to make way for the Hudson Bay Railway and development of the Town of The Pas.

By 1908, the band reopened their sawmill north of the river, and in 1912, the Town of The Pas was incorporated and The Pas Indian Band changed its name to Opaskwayak Cree Nation.

Between 1906 and 1910, Herman Finger set up the Finger Lumber Company in the area, and created a village called Fingerville for the company's workers. When the Town of The Pas was created in 1912, Fingerville was absorbed into The Pas, and Herman Finger became The Pas's first mayor.

Also in 1912, the community was transferred from Keewatin (a district of the Northwest Territories) to Manitoba as part of the Manitoba Boundaries Extension Act.

The area today is composed of three distinct communities: the Town of The Pas, the Opaskwayak Cree Nation, and the Rural Municipality of Kelsey.

The history of the town and the region may be seen at the Sam Waller Museum, in the old courthouse in downtown The Pas.

== Demographics ==
Historical population
Year	Pop.	±%
1921	1,858	—
1931	4,030	+116.9%
1941	3,181	−21.1%
1951	3,376	+6.1%
1961	4,671	+38.4%
1981	6,390	+36.8%
1986	6,283	−1.7%
1991	6,166	−1.9%
1996	5,945	−3.6%
2001	5,795	−2.5%
2006	5,589	−3.6%
2011	5,513	−1.4%
2016	5,369	−2.6%
2021	5,639	+5.0%

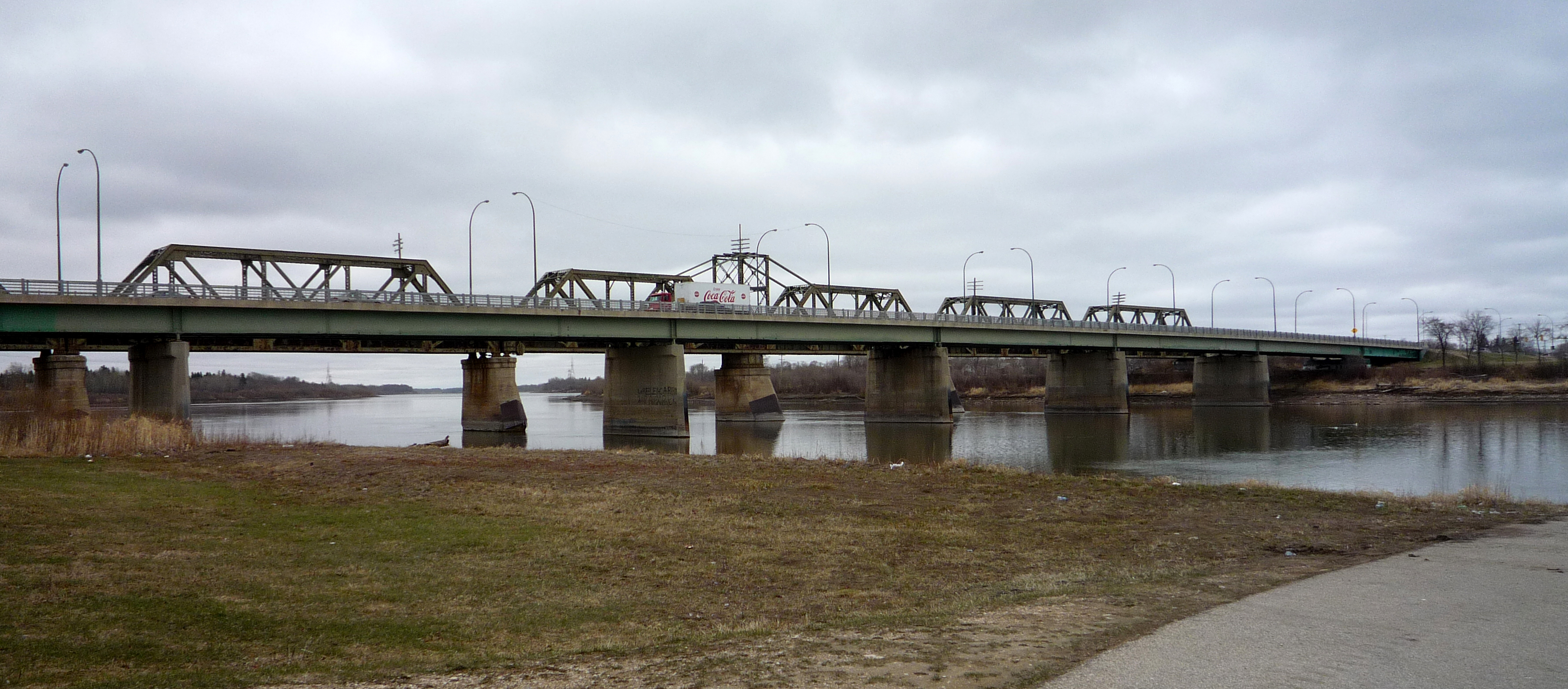
Manitoba Highway 10 crosses the Saskatchewan River at The Pas, part of the Northern Woods and Water Route.

In the 2021 Census of Population conducted by Statistics Canada, The Pas had a population of 5,639 living in 2,150 of its 2,365 total private dwellings, a change of 5% from its 2016 population of 5,369. With a land area of 44.69 km^{2} (17.25 sq mi), it had a population density of 126.2/km^{2} (326.8/sq mi) in 2021.

Most of the residents are Canadian citizens (99.3%).

The median age in The Pas is 34.1 years old. Age groups are: 9 and younger (16.2%), 10 to 19 (14.7%), 20s (13.6%), 30s (13.6%), 40s (13.1%), 50 to 64 (18.5%), and more than 65 (10.2%).

The unemployment rate in The Pas (in 2011) was 7.3%.

Educational attainment (in 2011): No certificate 30.2%; High school certificate 22.4%; College 21.6%; Apprenticeship 10.6%; University certificate 10.6%; University certificate (below bachelor) 4.5%.

The marital status of those aged over 15 is: married or living with common-law partner (52.9%); never been married (32.3%); divorced or separated (8.8%); widowed (5.7%).

There are 2,324 private dwellings in The Pas, most of them being occupied (94.1%). The average number of people per household is 2.5.

=== Ethnicity ===
According to the 2011 National Household Survey, the composition of its population was Aboriginals (46.2%): First Nations (26.4%) and Metis (19.8%); and white (51.3%). The visible minority population was 2.1%

Panethnic groups in the Town of The Pas (2001−2021)
Panethnic group	2021		2016		2011		2006		2001	
Panethnic group	Pop.	%	Pop.	%	Pop.	%	Pop.	%	Pop.	%
Indigenous	2,850	53.47%	2,455	47.67%	2,590	46.62%	2,240	40.58%	1,775	31%
European (Note: Statistic includes all persons that did not make up part of a visible minority or an indigenous identity.)	2,045	38.37%	2,460	47.77%	2,850	51.31%	3,130	56.7%	3,815	66.64%
South Asian	230	4.32%	110	2.14%	35	0.63%	50	0.91%	35	0.61%
African	75	1.41%	55	1.07%	20	0.36%	3	0%	10	0.17%
Southeast Asian (Note: Statistic includes total responses of "Filipino" and "Southeast Asian" under visible minority section on census.)	65	1.22%	60	1.17%	20	0.36%	20	0.36%	10	0.17%
East Asian (Note: Statistic includes total responses of "Chinese", "Korean", and "Japanese" under visible minority section on census.)	30	0.56%	10	0.19%	20	0.36%	40	0.72%	70	1.22%
Middle Eastern (Note: Statistic includes total responses of "West Asian" and "Arab" under visible minority section on census.)	25	0.47%	0	0%	20	0.36%	0	0%	0	0%
Latin American	0	0%	0	0%	0	0%	20	0.36%	0	0%
Other/multiracial (Note: Statistic includes total responses of "Visible minority, n.i.e." and "Multiple visible minorities" under visible minority section on census.)	0	0%	0	0%	0	0%	20	0.36%	0	0%
Total responses	5,330	94.52%	5,150	95.92%	5,555	100.76%	5,520	98.77%	5,725	98.71%
Total population	5,639	100%	5,369	100%	5,513	100%	5,589	100%	5,800	100%
Note: Totals greater than 100% due to multiple origin responses

=== Religion ===
The religious makeup of The Pas is Christian (67.2%), non-religious (30.2%), and the remaining 2.6% fall into another religion.

=== Language ===
Among residents of The Pas, 93.6% speak only English, while 6.2% report knowledge of both English and French. Among non-official languages, Indigenous languages are the most commonly spoken, representing 5.6% of the population.

== Culture ==
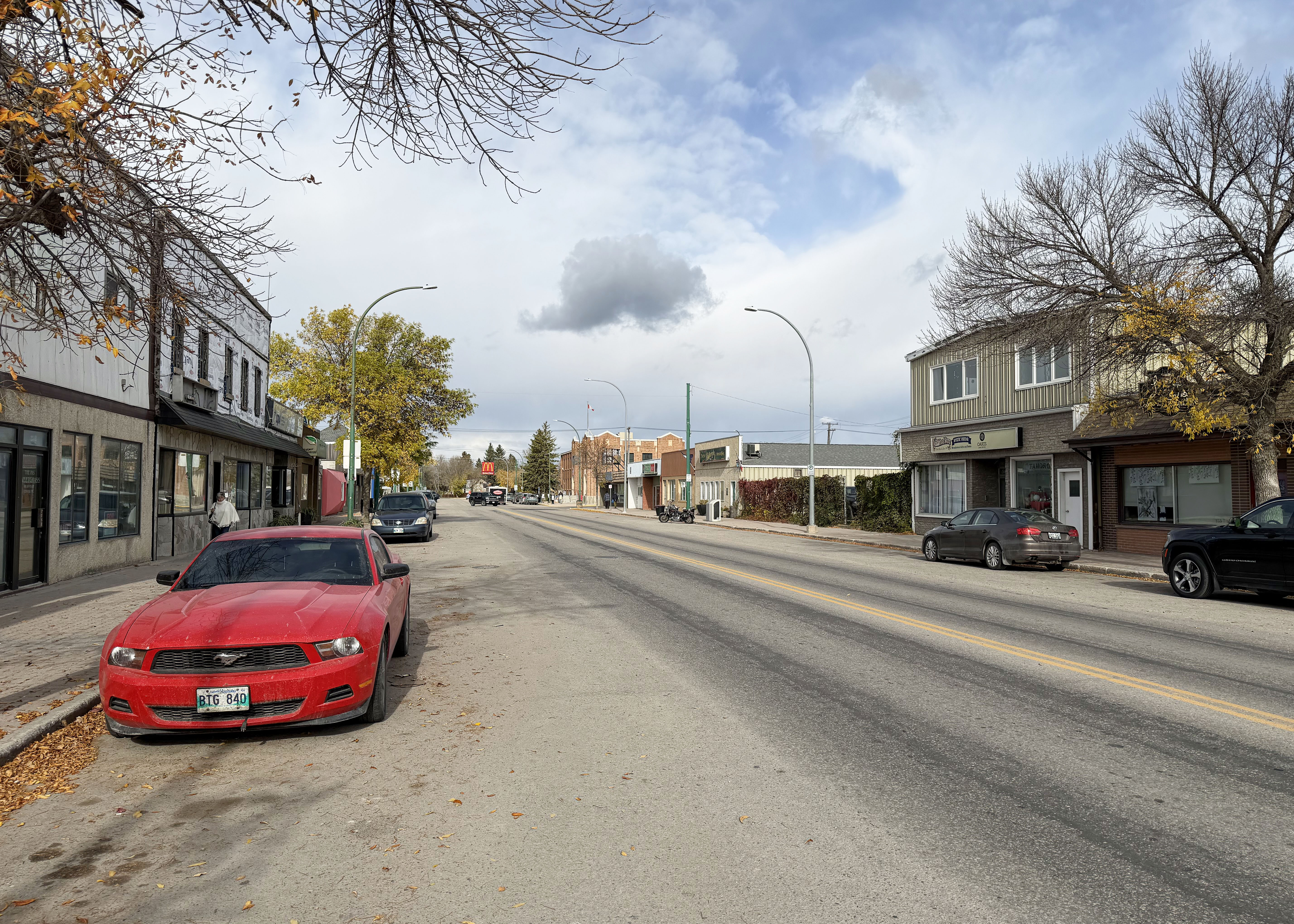
Fischer Avenue

Farley Mowat's Lost in the Barrens, published in 1956, is the first of two children/young adults novels that are set in The Pas. The story begins at a remote trapping lodge, and then moves into the Canadian "barren lands" further north. The Pas is the main trading centre to which the book's protagonists travel to stock up on provisions and supplies to take back to their homes in the bush. The book's sequel, Curse of the Viking Grave, makes mention of The Pas.

The Pas is the site of the Northern Manitoba Trappers' Festival, which is Manitoba's oldest festival and one of Canada's oldest winter festivals. It has been held every year since 1948 and features winter activities including ice fishing, muskrat skinning, and an annual sled dog race, which is part of the International Federation of Sleddog Sports.

A 1991 CBC movie, Conspiracy of Silence, is based on the 1971 murder of Helen Betty Osborne in The Pas.

== Climate ==
The Pas experiences a humid continental climate (Köppen Dfb) with long cold winters and short warm summers. The seasonal temperature range is between −19.1 and 18.1 °C (−2.4 and 64.6 °F), resulting in an amplitude of 37.2 °C (67.0 °F).

The highest temperature ever recorded in The Pas was 37.8 °C (100.0 °F) on 19 July 1941. The coldest temperature ever recorded was −49.4 °C (−56.9 °F) on 18 February 1966.

Climate data for The Pas Airport, 1981−2010 normals, extremes 1910−present (Note: Climate data was recorded at The Pas from June 1910 to May 1969 and at The Pas Airport from January 1943 to present.)
Month	Jan	Feb	Mar	Apr	May	Jun	Jul	Aug	Sep	Oct	Nov	Dec	Year
Record high °C (°F)	9.4 (48.9)	10.6 (51.1)	15.6 (60.1)	30.6 (87.1)	35.4 (95.7)	37.6 (99.7)	37.8 (100.0)	35.6 (96.1)	33.9 (93.0)	26.7 (80.1)	18.4 (65.1)	8.9 (48.0)	37.8 (100.0)
Mean daily maximum °C (°F)	−14.3 (6.3)	−10.3 (13.5)	−2.6 (27.3)	7.2 (45.0)	14.8 (58.6)	20.8 (69.4)	23.7 (74.7)	22.5 (72.5)	15.7 (60.3)	7.2 (45.0)	−3.8 (25.2)	−12 (10)	5.7 (42.3)
Daily mean °C (°F)	−19.1 (−2.4)	−15.9 (3.4)	−8.6 (16.5)	1.3 (34.3)	8.5 (47.3)	14.9 (58.8)	18.1 (64.6)	16.9 (62.4)	10.6 (51.1)	3.1 (37.6)	−7.4 (18.7)	−16.4 (2.5)	0.5 (32.9)
Mean daily minimum °C (°F)	−23.9 (−11.0)	−21.3 (−6.3)	−14.5 (5.9)	−4.6 (23.7)	2.2 (36.0)	9.0 (48.2)	12.4 (54.3)	11.3 (52.3)	5.6 (42.1)	−1 (30)	−11 (12)	−20.8 (−5.4)	−4.7 (23.5)
Record low °C (°F)	−47.8 (−54.0)	−49.4 (−56.9)	−41.7 (−43.1)	−30 (−22)	−12.8 (9.0)	−3.9 (25.0)	1.4 (34.5)	−5.6 (21.9)	−9.4 (15.1)	−23.9 (−11.0)	−36.1 (−33.0)	−46.1 (−51.0)	−49.4 (−56.9)
Average precipitation mm (inches)	16.8 (0.66)	13.4 (0.53)	17.8 (0.70)	23.9 (0.94)	40.1 (1.58)	66.3 (2.61)	68.8 (2.71)	66.5 (2.62)	57.3 (2.26)	38.5 (1.52)	20.9 (0.82)	19.7 (0.78)	449.9 (17.71)
Average rainfall mm (inches)	0.2 (0.01)	0.5 (0.02)	3.1 (0.12)	10.1 (0.40)	36.4 (1.43)	66.3 (2.61)	68.8 (2.71)	66.5 (2.62)	56.5 (2.22)	25.4 (1.00)	3.1 (0.12)	0.2 (0.01)	336.9 (13.26)
Average snowfall cm (inches)	22.8 (9.0)	18.5 (7.3)	18.8 (7.4)	16.0 (6.3)	3.9 (1.5)	0.0 (0.0)	0.0 (0.0)	0.0 (0.0)	0.8 (0.3)	14.5 (5.7)	23.5 (9.3)	27.3 (10.7)	146.1 (57.5)
Average precipitation days (≥ 0.2 mm)	10.7	8.6	8.3	7.3	9.4	11.0	13.3	11.8	11.3	11.0	10.5	10.6	123.8
Average rainy days (≥ 0.2 mm)	0.27	0.37	1.2	4.1	8.6	11.0	13.3	11.8	11.1	7.6	1.4	0.38	71.0
Average snowy days (≥ 0.2 cm)	11.8	9.2	8.1	4.3	1.2	0.07	0.0	0.0	0.33	4.6	10.7	11.7	62.0
Mean monthly sunshine hours	98.8	123.2	190.3	239.4	276.5	284.5	297.8	281.3	177.7	118.9	77.7	80.4	2,246.6
Percentage possible sunshine	39.7	44.8	51.9	57.0	55.9	55.7	58.0	61.1	46.5	36.2	30.1	34.6	47.6
Source: Environment Canada

== Sports ==
The OCN Blizzard, hockey team, competes in the Manitoba Junior Hockey League. The Pas is also home to the OCN Storm of the Keystone Junior Hockey League, the Huskies minor hockey league, and the MBCI Spartans who compete in Zone 11 of the MHSAA. The Intermediate 'A' version of The Pas Huskies won the 1968-69 Manitoba championship.

The son of former Husky star defenceman Jack Giles, Curt Giles, had a career in the NHL with New York Rangers, St. Louis, and Minnesota. The Pas native Murray Anderson was the first known locally born player to make the NHL, with Washington Capitals in the 1970s. Warren Harrison, younger brother of ex-Husky Roger Harrison, was drafted 53rd overall by the Oakland Seals in the 1969 NHL amateur draft.

The Pas Teepees were baseball champions in the Polar League in 1959. The team included several members of the Huskies, and were inducted into the Manitoba Sports Hall of Fame in 2005.

== Government ==
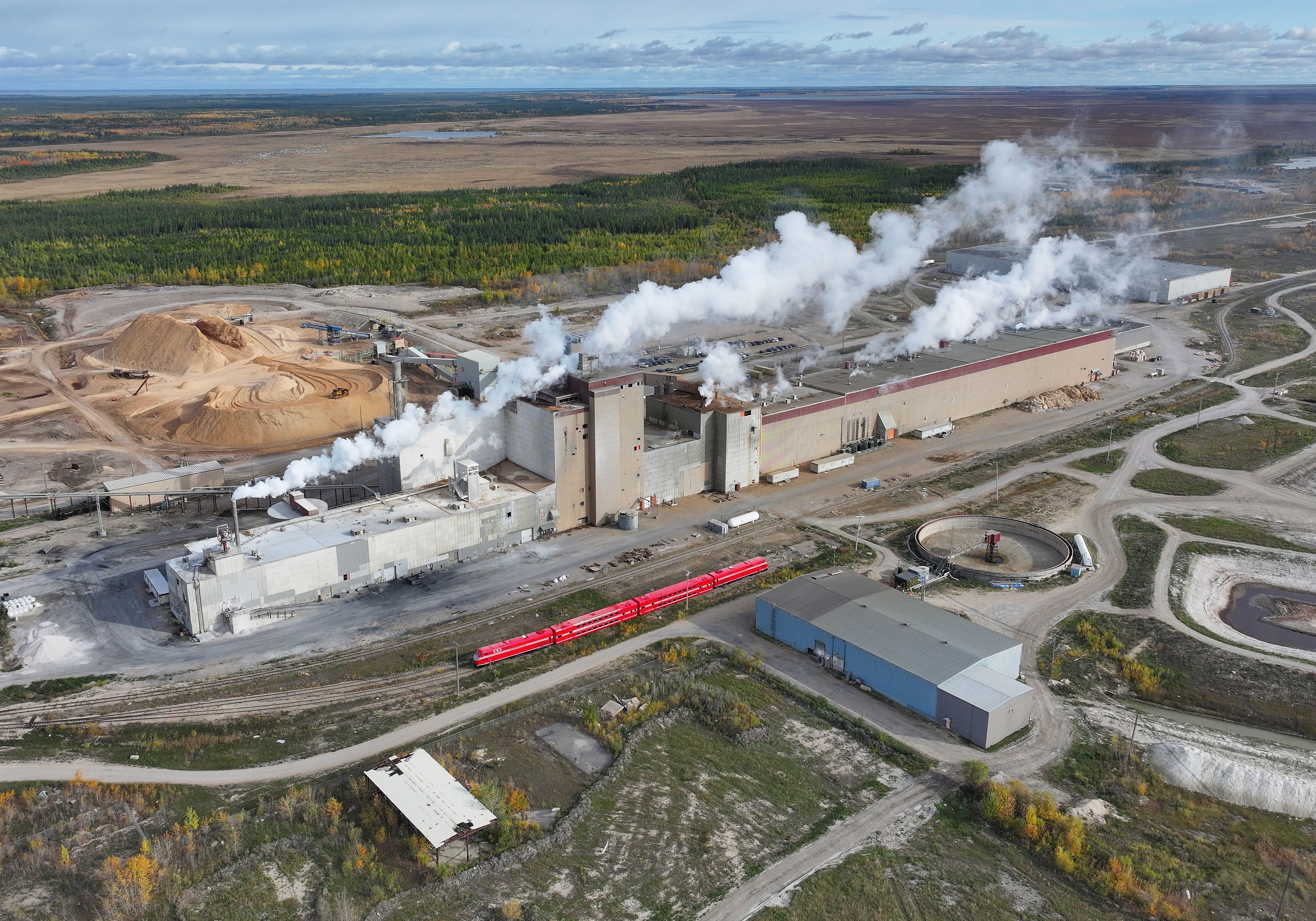
Canadian Kraft Paper Industries is the town's largest employer, operating a kraft paper mill

The Pas is governed by a mayor and six councillors who are elected by residents. The mayor is Andre Murphy.

The region is represented in the Legislative Assembly of Manitoba as part of The Pas-Kameesak riding. The seat is currently vacant. The most recent representative was the daughter of Oscar Lathlin, who had represented the riding from 1990 until his death in November 2008. Amanda Lathlin served as an MLA since a by-election on April 22, 2015, for The Pas; she was the first First Nations woman ever elected to the Manitoba legislature, she died in office on March 21, 2026.

In the House of Commons of Canada, The Pas is part of the Churchill—Keewatinook Aski riding. Its current federal representative is Liberal Member of Parliament Rebecca Chartrand. She has served as MP since the 2025 Canadian federal election.

== Education ==
The Pas' public school system is the Kelsey School Division, which consists of two elementary schools (Kelsey Community School and Opasquia School), one middle school (Scott Bateman Middle School), one alternate program and adult learning Centre (Mary Duncan School) and one high school (Margaret Barbour Collegiate Institute)

There is also a K–6 school (Joe A. Ross) and a junior high/high school (Oscar Lathlin Collegiate) on the Opaskwayak Cree Nation.

The town hosts the main campus of the University College of the North.

== Media ==
Radio

- AM 1240: CJAR, adult contemporary
- FM 92.7: CITP-FM, First Nations community radio
- FM 93.7: CKSB-3-FM, Première Chaîne (repeats CKSB Winnipeg)
- FM 94.5: CBWJ-FM, CBC Radio One (repeats CBWK-FM Thompson)

Television

CBWIT first went on the air in June, 1962 as CBWBT-1. The station broadcast kinescope recordings sent to the transmitter from CBWT. On March 1, 1969, the province-wide microwave system replaced the kinescope recordings, and The Pas has enjoyed live television since then.

All stations serving The Pas are repeaters of Winnipeg-based stations.

- CBWFT-1 Channel 6 (Radio-Canada)
- CBWIT Channel 7 (CBC)
- CKYP-TV Channel 12 (CTV)

Shaw Communications is the local cable television provider serving The Pas, and operates the local Shaw TV channel on cable channel 11.

Newspapers

- Opasquia Times

== Notable people ==
- Henry Budd, Anglican priest
- Parker Burrell, politician
- Albert Campbell, dog sleder
- Pat Carey, musician
- John Carroll, politician
- Ovide Charlebois, vicar
- Connor Dewar, hockey player
- Herman Finger, politician
- Curt Giles, hockey player
- Brian Goudie, hockey player
- Glen Gulutzan, hockey coach
- Owen Hughes, politician
- John Ingebrigtson, politician
- Amanda Lathlin, politician
- Oscar Lathlin, politician
- Tom Lamb (businessman), pilot
- Bif Naked, musician
- Robert Orok, politician
- Helen Betty Osborne, murder victim
- Walt Peacosh, hockey player
- Roddy Piper, wrestler
- Emile St. Godard, dog sleder
- W. B. Scarth, politician
- James Settee, Anglican priest
- Ernest J. Smith, architect
- Chelsea Stewart, soccer player
- Bernard Munroe Stitt, politician

== See also ==
- The Pas railway station
- Hudson Bay Railway
