= Amanda Lathlin =

Canadian politician (1976–2026)

Amanda Lathlin MLA
- Official portrait, 2023

Member of the Legislative Assembly of Manitoba for The Pas-Kameesak The Pas (2015–2019)
- In office April 22, 2015 – March 21, 2026
- Preceded by: Frank Whitehead
- Succeeded by: Jennifer Flett

Band Councillor in Opaskwayak Cree Nation
- In office 2009–2011

Personal details
- Born: Amanda Gail Lathlin; July 17, 1976 The Pas, Manitoba, Canada
- Died: March 21, 2026 (aged 49) Winnipeg, Manitoba, Canada
- Party: New Democratic Party
- Education: University of Manitoba (BA)

Amanda Gail Lathlin (July 17, 1976 – March 21, 2026) was a Canadian politician who represented the constituency of The Pas-Kameesak (formerly The Pas) in the Legislative Assembly of Manitoba from 2015 until her death in 2026. At the time of her election, she was the first First Nations woman to serve in Manitoba's legislature. She was a member of the New Democratic Party of Manitoba.

== Early life and career ==
Lathlin was born on July 17, 1976, the daughter of Oscar Lathlin, a former provincial cabinet minister who represented The Pas in the provincial legislature from 1990 to 2008. Prior to her election to the legislature, Lathlin worked for the University College of the North and served as a band councillor for the Opaskwayak Cree Nation.

== Political career ==
In 2015, Lathlin was nominated as the New Democratic Party candidate for a by-election following the resignation of Frank Whitehead on health grounds. Her nomination was determined by a contentious coin-toss after she and the other nominee, Florence Duncan, both received 295 votes. Lathlin was ultimately elected in the by-election, becoming the first First Nations woman elected to the provincial legislature. The turnout was the lowest recorded for a by-election in Manitoba. In the 2019 election, after the riding of The Pas was redistributed, Lathlin was re-elected the newly created riding of The Pas-Kameesak.

As a member of the legislative assembly, Lathlin forwarded legislation that allowed for compassionate care leave to be granted to workers who experienced a miscarriage. She recalled that, following her by-election win, she experienced a miscarriage and was subsequently hospitalized. Lathlin focused on delivering resources to child survivors of sexual violence living in the north of Manitoba, passing a "common sense priority" law to ensure that youth have better access to resources following the occurrence of sexual violence.

She was awarded the Queen Elizabeth II Platinum Jubilee Medal in 2022.

== Personal life and death ==
Lathlin was a foster parent, as well as a parent and grandmother. She recalled experiencing the removal of three of her nieces while she was on a trip to the United States by Opaskwayak Child and Family Services, an experience she said "tore" into her.

Lathlin died in Winnipeg on March 21, 2026, at the age of 49. Not long before her passing, it was stated by the governing party that she would leave due to health issues. Following her death, the Rural Municipality of Kelsey, Assembly of Manitoba Chiefs, Southern Chiefs Organization, and Liberal MP for Churchill—Keewatinook Aski, Rebecca Chartrand extended messages of condolence. The flags at the Manitoba Legislature flew at half-mast, and the session adjourned early on her behalf.

== Electoral record ==
2023 Manitoba general election: The Pas-Kameesak
Party	Candidate	Votes	%	±%	Expenditures
New Democratic	Amanda Lathlin	3,522	67.18	+9.27	$13,310.33
Progressive Conservative	Alan McLauchlan	1,506	28.72	+4.40	$25,109.47
Liberal	Alvina Rundle	215	4.10	+0.71	$4,535.93
Total valid votes/expense limit		5,243	99.62	–	$38,388.00
Total rejected and declined ballots		20	0.38	–0.11	
Turnout		5,263	53.52	+10.48	
Eligible voters		9,834			
New Democratic hold		Swing		+2.44	
Source(s) Source: Elections Manitoba

2019 Manitoba general election: The Pas-Kameesak
Party	Candidate	Votes	%	±%	Expenditures
New Democratic	Amanda Lathlin	3,180	57.90	+19.1	$9,983.35
Progressive Conservative	Ron Evans	1,336	24.33	-14.2	none listed
Green	Ralph McLean	790	14.38	+11.1	$1,993.53
Liberal	Ken Brandt	186	3.39	-15.9	$0.00
Total valid votes		5,492	99.51		
Rejected		27	0.49		
Turnout		5,519	43.04		
Eligible voters		12,823			
New Democratic hold		Swing		+16.6	
Source(s) Source: Manitoba. Chief Electoral Officer (2019). Statement of Votes for the 42nd Provincial General Election, September 10, 2019 (PDF) (Report). Winnipeg: Elections Manitoba.

2016 Manitoba general election: The Pas
Party	Candidate	Votes	%	±%	Expenditures
New Democratic	Amanda Lathlin	1,976	43.49	-13.28	$26,898.08
Progressive Conservative	Doug Lauvstad	1,765	38.84	+9.06	$14,083.14
Liberal	Tyler Duncan	586	12.90	-0.56	$2,326.92
Green	Patrick Wood	217	4.78	–	$33.78
Total valid votes		4,544	99.45	–	
Rejected		25	0.55	-0.03	
Turnout		4,569	30.70	+9.66	
Eligible voters		14,883			
New Democratic hold		Swing		-11.17	
Source(s) Source: Manitoba. Chief Electoral Officer (2016). Statement of Votes for the 41st Provincial General Election, April 19, 2016 (PDF) (Report). Winnipeg: Elections Manitoba. "Election Returns: 41st General Election". Elections Manitoba. 2016.

Manitoba provincial by-election, April 21, 2015: The Pas Resignation of Frank Whitehead
Party	Candidate	Votes	%	±%	Expenditures
New Democratic	Amanda Lathlin	1,557	56.76	-16.84	$26,202.75
Progressive Conservative	Jacob Nasekapow	817	29.78	+6.22	$31,878.68
Liberal	Inez Vystrcil-Spence	369	13.45	+10.63	$2,941.26
Total valid votes		2,743	99.42	–	
Rejected		16	0.58	+0.04	
Turnout		2,759	21.04	-9.35	
Eligible voters		13,111			
New Democratic hold		Swing		-11.53	
Source(s) Source: Elections Manitoba
