= Oscar Lathlin =

Canadian politician

Minister of Aboriginal and Northern Affairs
- In office September 25, 2002 – November 1, 2008
- Premier: Gary Doer
- Preceded by: Eric Robinson
- Succeeded by: Eric Robinson

Minister of Conservation
- In office October 5, 1999 – September 25, 2002
- Premier: Gary Doer
- Preceded by: department created
- Succeeded by: Steve Ashton

Member of the Legislative Assembly of Manitoba for The Pas
- In office September 11, 1990 – November 1, 2008
- Preceded by: Harry Harapiak
- Succeeded by: Frank Whitehead

Personal details
- Born: May 20, 1947 The Pas, Manitoba
- Died: November 1, 2008 (aged 61) near The Pas, Manitoba
- Party: New Democratic Party
- Occupation: teacher, First Nations band chief

Oscar Lathlin (May 20, 1947 – November 1, 2008) was a politician in Manitoba, Canada, and was a cabinet minister in the New Democratic Party government of Gary Doer.

== Biography ==
=== Life and career ===
Lathlin was born and raised at the Opaskwayak Cree Nation in The Pas, in northern Manitoba. He attended high school at Frontier Collegiate in Cranberry Portage, graduating in 1969, and also attended Brandon University.

He subsequently returned to his community, and worked as a band manager of The Pas Band. He was named executive director of the Swampy Cree Tribal Council in 1979, and was elected chief of The Pas Band in 1985. He also worked as an advisor to the Native Teacher Education Program, served on various committees of the Assembly of First Nations and was a senior advisor for the federal government of Canada on a variety of subjects.

He was married twice: first to Matilda Daniels and then to Leona Jebb.

In the 1990 provincial election, Lathlin was elected to the Legislative Assembly of Manitoba for the northern riding of The Pas, narrowly defeating Progressive Conservative Alfred McDonald. He was re-elected over McDonald by a greater margin in the 1995 election. The NDP came in second in both of these campaigns, and Lathlin served as critic for Native Affairs, Constitutional Development and Community Economic Development during his time as an opposition MLA. He also supported Lorne Nystrom's bid to become the leader of the federal New Democratic Party in 1995.

The NDP won the general election of 1999, although Lathlin was only re-elected by a narrow margin over PC candidate Ron Evans, a local aboriginal leader. He was subsequently named as Minister of Conservation in Gary Doer's first cabinet. On September 25, 2002, he was transferred to the Ministry of Aboriginal and Northern Affairs, also holding responsibility for the Communities Economic Development Fund. In 2003, he supported Bill Blaikie's campaign to become the leader of the federal NDP.

Lathlin was easily re-elected in the provincial elections of 2003 and 2007.

=== Death ===
On November 2, 2008, the Winnipeg Free Press reported that Lathlin had died early that morning. It was later revealed that Lathlin had died on the evening of November 1 at his cabin near The Pas, Manitoba.

He was succeeded by Frank Whitehead in a by-election on March 24, 2009. Following Whitehead's resignation from the legislature in 2014, Lathlin's daughter Amanda Lathlin won the resulting by-election.
