= International Federation of Sleddog Sports =

International sleddog sports governing body

- Sport: Sleddog sports
- Jurisdiction: International
- Abbreviation: IFSS
- Founded: 1985
- Headquarters: Belgium
- President: (Sweden) Helen Lundberg
- CEO: (France) Bernard Pépín

Official website
- sleddogsport.net

The International Federation of Sleddog Sports (IFSS) is a global governing/sanctioning body of sleddog sports. It represents 49 national sleddog sport federations and organizations that are overseen by the board and six continental directors.

The three sleddog sport categories that IFSS covers: dryland, skidogs, and sleds, which are competed in separate world championships on snow and off snow (dryland). IFSS also organizes the IFSS/WSA Long Distance World Championships and is involved in many non-racing activities that promote the sport, its safety, animal welfare.

== History ==
The International Federation of Sleddog Sports was founded in 1985 by the American International Sled Dog Racing Association and the now-defunct European Sled Dog Racing Association in order to focus the efforts of national, local and international organizations on the goal of Olympic recognition through membership of the Global Association of International Sports Federations.

The federation was incorporated in the United States in 1992. In 2013 the headquarters relocated from the US to Brussels.

== Events ==
- IFSS On-Snow World Championships Since 1990
- IFSS European Championships (ESDRA - European Sled Dog Racing Association)
- IFSS IFSS North American Championship Since 2024
- IFSS World Cup
- IFSS Winter World Championships

== Medalists ==
Source:

== Classes ==
• Canicross Women (DCW) ca 4,2 km

• Canicross Men (DCM) ca 4,2 km

• Canicross Junior Women (DCWJ) ca 3,5 km

• Canicross Junior Men (DCMJ) ca 3,5 km

• Canicross Masters Women (DCWM) ca 4,2 km

• Canicross Masters Men (DCMM) ca 4,2 km

• Bikejoring Women (DBW) ca 6 km

• Bikejoring Men (DBM) ca 6 km

• Bikejoring Junior Women (DBWJ) ca 4,5 km

• Bikejoring Junior Men (DBMJ) ca 4,5 km

• Bikejoring Masters Women (DBWM) ca 6 km

• Bikejoring Masters Men (DBMM) ca 6 km

• Scooter one dog Women (DSW1) ca 5,5 km

• Scooter one dog Men (DSM1) ca 5,5 km

• Scooter one dog Junior (DS1J) ca 4,5 km

• Scooter one dog Masters Women (DS1WM) ca 5,5 km

• Scooter one dog Masters Men (DS1MM) ca 5,5 km

• Scooter 2-dog (DS2) ca 5,5 km

• 4-dog Rig (DR4) ca 4,5 km

• 4-dog Rig Junior (DR4J) ca 4,5 km

• 6-dog Rig (DR6) ca 6 to 6.5 km

• 8-dog Rig (DR8) ca 7 to 7.5 km

• RELAY (DR): Canicross, DS1, DB ca 2,5 + 4,5 + 4,5 km

== Members ==
=== Nations ===
32 Nation on 1 August 2024:

==== Asia ====
1. South Korea
2. Mongolia

==== Oceania ====
1. Australia
2. New Zealand

==== Americas ====
1. Argentina
2. Brazil
3. Canada
4. Chile
5. Mexico
6. United States
7. Colombia

==== Europe ====
1. Austria
2. Belgium
3. Czech Republic
4. Denmark
5. Finland
6. France
7. Germany
8. United Kingdom
9. Hungary
10. Italy
11. Latvia
12. Lithuania
13. Netherlands
14. Norway
15. Poland
16. Slovakia
17. Spain
18. Sweden
19. Switzerland
20. Estonia
21. Slovenia

=== Others ===
1. ISDRA - International Sled Dog Racing Association - Honorary Member, USA
2. ISDVMA - International Sled Dog Veterinary Medical Association - Associate Member, USA
3. P.R.I.D.E - Mush with PRIDE - Associate Member, USA
4. WSA - World Sleddog Association - Associate Member, Germany
5. FIDASC - Federazione Italiana Discipline Armi Sportive da Caccia - Associate Member, Italy

== Sleddog sports categories ==
Dryland events include:

- Canicross
- Bikejoring
- 1-2 dog scooters
- 4-6-8 dog wheel rigs

Skidog events include:

- 1-2 dog Skijoring
- Pulka

Sled classes:

- 2-4-6-8-10&unlimited sleddog sprint
- 6 and 12 sleddog middle distances
- 8 and unlimited sleddog long distances

== See also ==
- Sled dog racing
- Iditarod Trail Sled Dog Race
- Sledgehammer
- Sledge hockey
- Sledgehammer Games
- Greyhound racing
- Greyhound
- Greyhound racing in the United States
