= Opaskwayak Cree Nation =

First Nation in Manitoba, Canada

Coordinates: 53.816°N 101.252°W

- Band No. 315
- People: Swampy Cree
- Treaty: Treaty 5
- Province: Manitoba; Saskatchewan

Land
- Main reserve: OCN 21E
- Reserves: OCN 21, 21A, 21A South, 21B, 21C, 21D, 21F, 21G, 21I, 21J, 21K, 21L, 21N, 21P, 27A; Egg Lake Indian Reserve #1; Rocky Lake; Rocky Lake Interior; Root Lake 231; Root Lake Beach Ridge Site Indian Reserve; Salt Channel 21D
- Land area: 177.851 km^{2} (68.669 sq mi)

Population (2022)
- On reserve: 3380
- On other land: 27
- Off reserve: 3180
- Total population: 6587

Government
- Chief: Maureen Brown

Tribal Council
- Swampy Cree Tribal Council

Website
- opaskwayak.com

The Opaskwayak Cree Nation (/ˌoʊpəˈskwaɪək/; OCN; Cree: ᐅᐸᐢᑿᔭᐠ, opâskwêyâhk, 'at the wooded narrows') is a First Nations band government located in Manitoba, Canada. The main OCN reserve is regarded as one of three distinct communities that comprise "The Pas area" in northern Manitoba, with the two others being the Town of The Pas and the Rural Municipality of Kelsey.

Most of the OCN's on-reserve population lives near the Town of The Pas on the OCN 21E reserve, but the band also has many other reserves stretching from Goose Lake in the north to Mountain Cabin, Saskatchewan, in the south. OCN is accessible by rail, road, water, and air travel.

Peoples of the OCN are Swampy Cree, and their dominant language is from the Swampy Cree n-dialect. The Opaskwayak people first negotiated and entered into Treaty 5 in 1876.

The First Nation hosts the Opaskwayak Indigenous Days annually each August.

== History ==
When the Opaskwayak people signed Treaty 5 on in 1876, the federal government agreed to give timber rights. In 1904, the band opened a sawmill on Mission Island on the Saskatchewan River. Soon after, the band surrendered their land on the south side of the river, and in 1908, moved its sawmill to the north side. The sawmill operated intermittently until 1930, and provided wood for most of the homes built in the first few decades of the 20th century.

According to oral tradition, Cree peoples have occupied the landscape of north-central Manitoba since time immemorial; this claim has been supported by archaeology. The earliest archeological evidence of the people occupying the area has been carbon dated 2,600–4,000 years ago.

The current townsite of Opaskwayak, reserve parcel 21E, was a historical gathering place where people travelled for spiritual healing. The area Cree would meet here every summer to fish, harvest, and cultivate the land. Also during this time, it was an opportunity for creating social ties and practicing the ceremonial way of life known as the Midewiwin, or Grand Medicine Society.

The language of the Opaskwayak people is from the Swampy Cree n-dialect. There was a number of local bands who shared the same defined territory which, in turn, composed of a number of interrelated families who came together periodically through the year for various social, cultural activities and ceremonies.

=== MacKay Indian Residential School ===
In 1912, an area located about 11 km (7 mi) northwest of The Pas, bordering on the Opaskwayak Cree Nation, was chosen by a representative of the federal Indian Department as the site for a new Indian residential school. 20 acres (8.1 ha) of forest were cleared and a building was constructed between the fall of 1912 and June 1914.

Opening for classes in October 1914, the school was named the MacKay Indian Residential School in commemoration of Anglican archdeacon John Alexander Mackay of Saskatchewan. In its first year, the school had 81 pupils. As the land was largely unsuitable for farming, the school only had a vegetable garden to grow food for students.

The school was administered by the Bishop and Diocese of Saskatchewan until January 1922, when it was transferred to the Missionary Society of the Church of England in Canada. It was destroyed by fire on March 19, 1933, and was not rebuilt. Many of the displaced students were sent to the Elkhorn and Lake La Ronge schools. Another residential school of the same name operated at Dauphin from 1955 to 1980.

The former school site is now used for community events.

== Development, education, and recreation ==
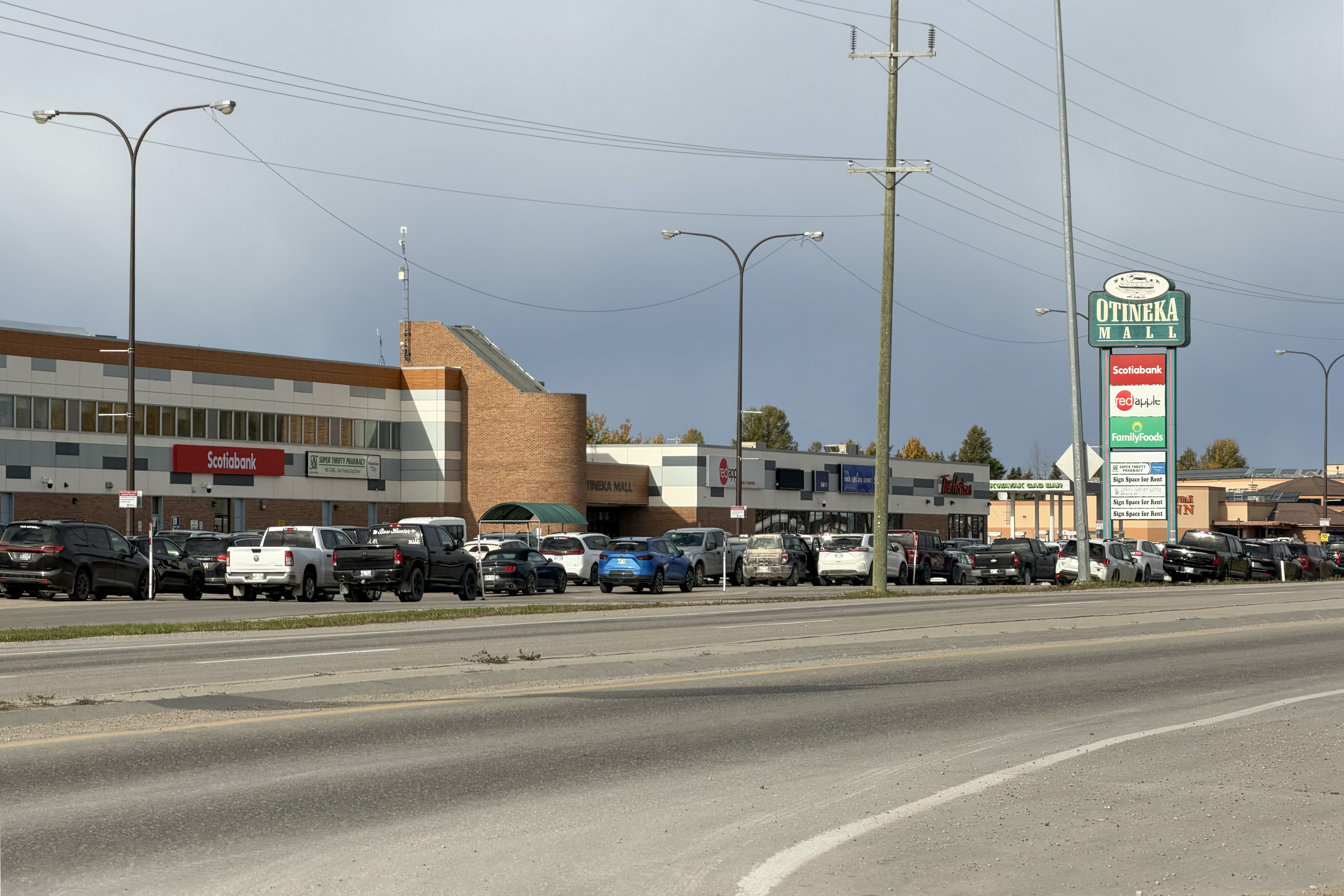
Otineka Mall

=== Otineka Mall ===
Otineka Mall is a 225,000 sq ft (20,900 m^{2}) shopping mall located across the Saskatchewan River from The Pas. It opened in 1976 and is the largest mall in northern Manitoba.

=== Gordon Lathlin Memorial Centre ===
Gordon Lathlin Memorial Centre is a 1,100-seat arena, built in 1985. Since 1996 it has been home to the OCN Blizzard, who play in the Manitoba Junior Hockey League. During a four-month off-season for hockey each year, the centre is used for social gatherings, concerts, and weddings.

The arena is named after the late Gordon Lathlin, who served as the Opaskwayak's chief from 1967 to 1974.

In 2012, a second hockey tenant began play at the GLMC when OCN Storm joined the Keystone Junior Hockey League.

=== Education ===
In terms of education on-reserve, OCN houses the Hilda Young Child Care Centre, Joe A. Ross School, and Oscar Lathlin Collegiate. The band government also supports post-secondary students at various institutions throughout Canada and the United States.

In January 2023, Opaskwayak, along with the federal and provincial governments, announced the construction of a new apartment block in downtown Winnipeg which will be owned and operated by OCN. OCN intends to lease several of the units to First Nations students, though the apartment will be open to other applicants as well.

The building will be seven stories tall and is located next to the University of Winnipeg's Axworthy Health & RecPlex. Built by Paragon Design Build and Bockstael Construction, the apartment's construction is expected to take 18 months and be done by summer 2024.

The combined funding will equal a $17.4-million investment, with contributions from Opaskwayak, the Government of Manitoba through Efficiency Manitoba, and the Government of Canada through the Canada Mortgage and Housing Corporation.

== Government ==
The band is governed by the Chief and eight Councillors, who are elected according to its own election code which was adopted by its members in 2012, for a three-year term.

The reserve consists of 24 parcels of land varying in size from 10 to 5,200 acres and totaling about 45,000 acres. The most populated settlements are located in and around The Pas. Most of the reserve's borders are with the Rural Municipality of Kelsey and The Pas. The balance is with the unorganized portion of Census Division No. 21.

== Notable people ==
- Wilfred Buck, educator
- Jennifer Flett, politician
- Amanda Lathlin, politician
- Oscar Lathlin, politician
- Greg Younging, writer

== See also ==
- OCN Storm
- OCN Blizzard
